= List of songs recorded by Sunidhi Chauhan =

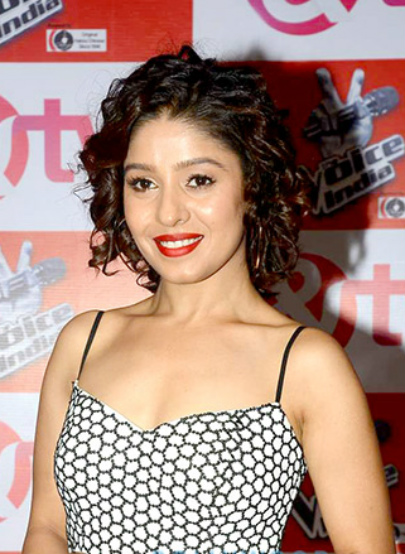
- Sunidhi Chauhan at the launch of The Voice India in 2015
- Category: Songs
Hindi Film Songs	1161
Hindi Non-Film songs	47
Bengali Film Songs	26
Bengali Non-Film Songs	7
Telugu Film Songs	43
Tamil Film Songs	33
Punjabi Songs	55
Marathi Film Songs	17
Kannada Film Songs	30
Malayalam Film Songs	5
Gujarati Film Songs	2
Assamese Songs	2
English Songs	2
Bhojpuri Film Songs	1
Urdu Film Songs	10
Total	1441

This is a list of songs recorded by Indian female playback singer Sunidhi Chauhan

== Hindi songs ==
=== 1996 ===
Film	Song	Composer(s)	Writer(s)	Co-singer(s)	Ref.
Shastra	"Ladki Deewani Dekho"	Aadesh Shrivastava	Shyam Raj	Aditya Narayan, Udit Narayan	

=== 1999 ===
Film	Song	Composer(s)	Writer(s)	Co-singer(s)	Ref.
Bade Dilwala	"Tu Tu Ru Tu Ru"	Aadesh Shrivastava	Qateel Shifai	Udit Narayan	
Dahek	"Ho Gori Aaja"	Aadesh Shrivastava	Dev Kohli	Vinod Rathod, Udit Narayan, Alka Yagnik	
Jaanwar	"Paas Bulati Hai"	Anand–Milind	Sameer	Alka Yagnik	
Jaanwar	"Tujhko Naa Dekhoon"	Anand–Milind	Sameer	Udit Narayan	
Jaanwar	"Rishta Dilon Ka" (Sad Version)	Anand–Milind	Sameer		
Mast	"Main Mast"	Sandeep Chowta	Nitin Raikwar		
Mast	"Suna Tha"	Sandeep Chowta	Nitin Raikwar	Sonu Nigam	
Mast	"Ruki Ruki"	Sandeep Chowta	Nitin Raikwar	Sonu Nigam	

=== 2000 ===
Film	Song	Composer(s)	Writer(s)	Co-singer(s)	Ref.
Aaghaaz	"Nau Nau Lakha"	Anu Malik	Sameer	Hema Sardesai, Kumar Sanu, Rahul	
Aaghaaz	"Dosti Ho Gayi Re"	Anu Malik	Sameer	Sonu Nigam	
Baaghi	"Chaha Tha Tujhe"	Sajid-Wajid	Faaiz Anwar	Sonu Nigam	
Bichhoo	"Ekwari Tak Le"	Anand Raj Anand	Sameer	Harry Anand	
Champion	"Aisa Champion Kahan"	Anu Malik	Javed Akhtar	Jaspinder Narula	
Fiza	"Mehboob Mere"	Anu Malik	Tejpal Kaur	Karsan Sagathia	
Gang	"Meri Payal Bole"	Anu Malik	Javed Akhtar	Anu Malik, Alka Yagnik	
Hum To Mohabbat Karega	"Hum To Mohabbat Karega" (Version 1)	Anu Malik	Majrooh Sultanpuri	Sonu Nigam	
Hum To Mohabbat Karega	"Hum To Mohabbat Karega" (Version 2)	Anu Malik	Majrooh Sultanpuri		
Jis Desh Mein Ganga Rehta Hain	"Kem Chhe" (Version 1)	Anand Raj Anand	Dev Kohli	Bali Brahmbhatt	
Jis Desh Mein Ganga Rehta Hain	"Kem Chhe" (Version 2)	Anand Raj Anand	Dev Kohli	Bali Brahmbhatt	
Joru Ka Ghulam	"Joru Ka Ghulam"	Aadesh Shrivastava	Sameer	Abhijeet	
Jungle	"Aiyo Aiyo Rama"	Sandeep Chowta	Anand Bakshi	Sonu Nigam, Makarand Deshpande, Sowmya Raoh	
Jungle	"Jaan"	Sandeep Chowta	Anand Bakshi	Kumar Sanu	
Jungle	"Do Pyaar Karne Wale"	Sandeep Chowta	Anand Bakshi	Sonu Nigam	
Jungle	"Pehli Baar"	Sandeep Chowta	Anand Bakshi	Sonu Nigam	
Kurukshetra	"Ban Than"	Sukhwinder Singh	Madan Pal	Sukhwinder Singh	
Kurukshetra	"Ghagra"	Himesh Reshammiya	Sudhakar Sharma		
Mission Kashmir	"Bumbro"	Shankar–Ehsaan–Loy	Rahat Indori	Shankar Mahadevan, Jaspinder Narula	

=== 2001 ===
Film	Song	Composer(s)	Writer(s)	Co-singer(s)	Ref.
Aamdani Atthani Kharcha Rupaiyaa	"Sajaniya Re"	Himesh Reshammiya	Sudhakar Sharma	Babul Supriyo	
Aamdani Atthani Kharcha Rupaiyaa	"Style Nasha Tera"	Himesh Reshammiya	Sudhakar Sharma	Udit Narayan, Babul Supriyo	
Aamdani Atthani Kharcha Rupaiyaa	"Ta Thaiya Ta Thaiya"	Himesh Reshammiya	Sudhakar Sharma	Preeti, Pinky, Shaan	
Ajnabee	"Kasam Se Teri Aankhen"	Anu Malik	Sameer	Udit Narayan, Sonu Nigam, Alka Yagnik	
Ajnabee	"Mehbooba Mehbooba"	Anu Malik	Sameer	Adnan Sami	
Ajnabee	"Mehbooba Mehbooba" (Remix Version)	Anu Malik	Sameer	Adnan Sami	
Ajnabee	"Mujhko Neend Aa Rahi Hai"	Anu Malik	Sameer	Sonu Nigam	
Ajnabee	"Meri Zindagi Mein"	Anu Malik	Sameer	Kumar Sanu	
Arjun Devaa	"Sawan Aayo Re"	Gunvantraaj	Rekha Mistry	Kumar Sanu	
Aśoka	"Aa Tayar Hoja"	Anu Malik	Gulzar		
Deewaanapan	"Haan Mera Deewaanapan" (Version 1)	Aadesh Shrivastava	Sameer	Shaan	
Deewaanapan	"Haan Mera Deewaanapan" (Version 2)	Aadesh Shrivastava	Sameer	Shaan	
Ehsaas: The Feeling	"Ek Baar Pyar"	Anand Raj Anand	Praveen Bharadwaj	Sonu Nigam	
Ehsaas: The Feeling	"Yeh Kaisa Ehsaas Hai"	Milind Sagar	Madan Pal	Sonu Nigam	
Farz	"Jhanak Jhanak Baaje"	Aadesh Shrivastava	Sameer	Richa Sharma, KK	
Hum Ho Gaye Aapke	"Re Mama"	Nadeem–Shravan	Sameer		
Indian	"Yeh Pyar"	Anand Raj Anand	Anand Bakshi	Richa Sharma	
Ittefaq	"Main Aashiq Hoon"	Dilip Sen - Sameer Sen	Sameer	Babul Supriyo	
Jodi No.1	"Mast Mast"	Anand Raj Anand	Dev Kohli	Sonu Nigam	
Jodi No.1	"Teri Bindiya"	Anand Raj Anand	Dev Kohli	Abhijeet	
Kabhi Khushi Kabhie Gham	"Say Shava Shava"	Aadesh Shrivastava	Sameer	Alka Yagnik, Sudesh Bhonsle, Udit Narayan, Amitabh Bachchan	
Khatron Ke Khiladi	"Jale Jale Jawani Meri"	Ram Shankar	Rajendra Bhatt	Vinod Rathod	
Kuch Khatti Kuch Meethi	"Ab Nahi To Kab"	Anu Malik	Sameer	Anu Malik	
Love Ke Liye Kuch Bhi Karega	"Love Ke Liye"	Vishal Bhardwaj	Abbas Tyrewala	Udit Narayan	
Mitti	"Oh Calcutta"	Monty Sharma	Rahul B. Seth		
Mujhe Meri Biwi Se Bachaao	"Deewane Yunhi Nahin"	Rajesh Roshan	Majrooh Sultanpuri	Sukhwinder Singh	
Nayak	"Saiyyan"	A.R. Rahman	Anand Bakshi	Hans Raj Hans	
Paagalpan	"A Ding Dong Do"	Raju Singh	Sameer	Udit Narayan, Javed Ali, Vicky, Harward	
Prince No. 1	"Pyar Kar Shuru"	Mani Sharma	Ravinder Rawal	Sonu Nigam	
Rahul	"Piya Ki Jogan"	Anu Malik	Anand Bakshi	Richa Sharma	
Rehnaa Hai Terre Dil Mein	"Tujhe Dekha Jabse"	Anand Raj Anand	Sameer	Shaan	
Style	"Mohabbat Ho Na Jaye"	Sanjeev-Darshan	Abbas Katka	Udit Narayan	
Taj Mahal - A Monument Of Love	"Taj Mahal Ki Ba Zabaani" (Version 1)	Santosh Nair	Rahul B. Seth	KK	
Taj Mahal - A Monument Of Love	"Taj Mahal Ki Ba Zabaani" (Version 2)	Santosh Nair	Rahul B. Seth	KK	
Taj Mahal - A Monument Of Love	"Story Of Eternal Love"	Santosh Nair	Rahul B. Seth		
Yaadein	"Alaap"	Anu Malik	Anand Bakshi		
Yaadein	"Jab Dil Miley"	Anu Malik	Anand Bakshi	Asha Bhosle, Udit Narayan, Sukhwinder Singh	
Yaadein	"Yaadein Yaad Aati Hain" (Female Version)	Anu Malik	Anand Bakshi	Mahalakshmi Iyer	

=== 2002 ===
Film	Song	Composer(s)	Writer(s)	Co-singer(s)	Ref.
Ab Ke Baras	"Aaya Maahi"	Anu Malik	Sameer	Sukhwinder Singh, Richa Sharma	
Akhiyon Se Goli Maare	"Dehradun Ka Choona Lagaya"	Daboo Malik	Salim Bijnori	Vinod Rathod	
Annarth	"Diwana Dil"	Anand Raj Anand	Dev Kohli		
Awara Paagal Deewana	"Awara Paagal Deewana"	Anu Malik	Sameer	Shaan	
Awara Paagal Deewana	"Maine To Khai Kasam"	Anu Malik	Sameer	Abhijeet	
Awara Paagal Deewana	"More Sawariya"	Anu Malik	Sameer	Shaan, Anu Malik	
Awara Paagal Deewana	"Ya Habibi"	Anu Malik	Sameer	Anu Malik, Adnan Sami, Shabbir Kumar, George Moawad	
Awara Paagal Deewana	"Jisse Hasna Rona"	Anu Malik	Sameer	Sonu Nigam, Alka Yagnik, Udit Narayan, Shaan, Sarika Kapoor	
Bharat Bhagya Vidhata	"Dil Se Aa Tu" (Version 1)	Hriju Roy	Mehboob	Abhijeet	
Bharat Bhagya Vidhata	"Dil Se Aa Tu" (Version 2)	Hriju Roy	Mehboob	Abhijeet	
Chor Machaaye Shor	"Ishqan Ishqan Ho Gayi"	Anu Malik	Tejpal Kaur	Adnan Sami	
Deewangee	"Ai Ajnabi"	Ismail Darbar	Salim Bijnori		
Deewangee	"Ye Taazgi Yeh Saadgi"	Ismail Darbar	Nusrat Badr		
Dil Vil Pyar Vyar	"O Haseena Zulfowali"	R. D. Burman	Majrooh Sultanpuri	Abhijeet	
Dushmani	"Main Mast Malang"	Nikhil-Vinay	Rajan Raj	Sukhwinder Singh	
Gunaah	"Theme Of Gunaah"	Anand Raj Anand	—N/a		
Humein Tumse Pyar Ho Gaya Chupke Chupke	"Lambuji Oh Lambuji"	Bappi Lahiri	Ibrahim Ashq		
Humein Tumse Pyar Ho Gaya Chupke Chupke	"Poonam Ki Raat Aisee Ayee Hai"	Bappi Lahiri	Ibrahim Ashq	Udit Narayan	
Humraaz	"Bardaasht"	Himesh Reshammiya	Sudhakar Sharma	KK	
Humraaz	"Bardaasht (Remix)"	Himesh Reshammiya	Sudhakar Sharma	Sonu Nigam	
Jaani Dushman	"Jaaneman Tu Khub Hai"	Anand Raj Anand	Sameer	Sonu Nigam	
Jeena Sirf Merre Liye	"Pyar Mange"	Nadeem–Shravan	Sameer	Babul Supriyo	
Junoon	"Hey Rama"	Aadesh Shrivastava	Shyam Raj		
Kaaboo	"Ae Babu"	Anchal Talesara	Kumaar	Babul Supriyo	
Kaante	"Baby Baby"	Anand Raj Anand	Dev Kohli		
Kaante	"Ishq Samundar"	Anand Raj Anand	Dev Kohli	Anand Raj Anand	
Kitne Door Kitne Paas	"Diwana Dil Hai Mera"	Sanjeev-Darshan	Abbas Katka	Sonu Nigam	
Kitne Door Kitne Paas	"Yaar Main India Chala"	Sanjeev-Darshan	Anand Bakshi	Sonu Nigam	
Kranti	"Ishq Jadu Ishq Tona"	Jatin–Lalit	Anand Bakshi	Amit Kumar	
Kranti	"Mera Dil Tu Wapas Mod De"	Jatin–Lalit	Anand Bakshi	Shaan	
Kuch Tum Kaho Kuch Hum Kahein	"Tuhi Hai"	Anu Malik	Sameer	Shaan	
Kya Yehi Pyaar Hai	"Dil Pe Chaane Laga"	Sajid-Wajid	Jalees Sherwani	KK	
Maa Tujhhe Salaam	"Dekhne Ko Tujhko"	Sajid-Wajid	Sameer	Sonu Nigam	
Maa Tujhhe Salaam	"Oye Ranjhana"	Sajid-Wajid	Tejpal Kaur		
Maine Dil Tujhko Diya	"Aaja Ve Saajan"	Daboo Malik	Salim Bijnori	Alka Yagnik	
Maine Dil Tujhko Diya	"Maine Dil Tujhko Diya"	Daboo Malik	Jalees Sherwani	Sonu Nigam	
Mere Yaar Ki Shaadi Hai	"Hum Dono Jaisa"	Jeet-Pritam	Javed Akhtar	KK	
Pehli Nazar Ka Pehla Pyaar	"Mansuba Mansuba"	R. P. Patnaik	Sudhakar Sharma	Sonu Nigam	
Pehli Nazar Ka Pehla Pyaar	"Pehli Nazar Mein Dil Hain Diya"	R. P. Patnaik	Sudhakar Sharma	Sonu Nigam	
Pitaah	"Meri Jawani"	Anand Raj Anand	Praveen Bharadwaj		
Pyaasa	"Tere Pyar Ka Chhaya" (Version 1)	Sanjeev-Darshan	Faaiz Anwar	Adnan Sami	
Pyaasa	"Tere Pyar Ka Chhaya" (Version 2)	Sanjeev-Darshan	Faaiz Anwar	Abhijeet	
Rishtey	"Apun Ko To"	Sanjeev-Darshan	Abbas Katka		
Rishtey	"Deewana Deewana" (Female Version)	Sanjeev-Darshan	Abbas Katka		
Road	"Khullam Khulla Pyar"	Sandesh Shandilya	Makarand Deshpande	Sonu Nigam	
Road	"Pehli Nazar Mein"	Sandesh Shandilya	Makarand Deshpande	Mohit Chauhan	
Road	"Raste Raste"	Sandesh Shandilya	Jaideep Sahni	Vinod Rathod	
Road	"Toofan Se"	Nitin Raikwar	Nitin Raikwar	KK	
Sur – The Melody of Life	"Aa Bhi Ja"	M.M. Kreem	Nida Fazli	Lucky Ali	
Sur – The Melody of Life	"Tu Dil Ki Khushi"	M.M. Kreem	Nida Fazli	Lucky Ali	
Sur – The Melody of Life	"Dil Mein Jaagi Dhadkan Aise"	M.M. Kreem	Nida Fazli		
Vadh	"Aankh Lada Le"	Vishal–Shekhar	Nida Fazli		
Vadh	"Hath Phirade"	Vishal–Shekhar	Nida Fazli		
Vadh	"Tere Bina"	Vishal–Shekhar	Nida Fazli		
Vadh	"Vadh"	Vishal–Shekhar	Nida Fazli		
Vadh	"Aayega Koi Aayega"	Vishal–Shekhar	Nida Fazli	Shankar Mahadevan, Sapna Awasthi	
Yeh Kaisi Mohabbat	"Din Jawani Ke Char Char"	Sandeep Chowta	Nitin Raikwar		
Yeh Kya Ho Raha Hai?	"Kuch Hum Bhi Pagal Hain"	Shankar–Ehsaan–Loy	Javed Akhtar	Shweta Pandit, Gayatri Ganjawala	
Yeh Mohabbat Hai	"Chill Pil"	Anand Raj Anand	Dev Kohli	Shaan	
Yeh Mohabbat Hai	"Mar Gai Chhokri"	Anand Raj Anand	Dev Kohli	Sapna Awasthi	
Zindagi Khoobsoorat Hai	"Choodiyan"	Anand Raj Anand	Anand Raj Anand	Anand Raj Anand, Mohammed Aziz	

=== 2003 ===
Film	Song	Composer(s)	Writer(s)	Co-singer(s)	Ref.	
Armaan	"Meri Zindagi Mein Aaye Ho"	Shankar–Ehsaan–Loy	Javed Akhtar	Sonu Nigam		
Baaz: A Bird in Danger	"Arre Arre Jala Koi Mita Koi"	Ismail Darbar	Mehboob Kotwal	Kailash Kher		
Baaz: A Bird in Danger	"Sannate Mein" (Duet Version)	Ismail Darbar	Mehboob Kotwal	Mohammad Salamat		
Basti	"Gin Gin Kaise Kaate Hai Din"	Milind Sagar	Sudhakar Sharma, Anwar Sagar			
Basti	"Madhoshiyaan Hain"	Milind Sagar	Sudhakar Sharma, Anwar Sagar	Udit Narayan		
Bhoot	"Bhoot Hoon Main"	Salim–Sulaiman	Lalit Marathe	Vijay Prakash, Salim Merchant		
Bhoot	"Bhoot Hoon Main" (Remix Version)	Salim–Sulaiman	Lalit Marathe	Vijay Prakash, Salim Merchant		
Bhoot	"Ghor Andhere"	Salim–Sulaiman	Lalit Marathe	Clinton Cerejo, Vijay Prakash, Salim Merchant		
Chaalbaaz	"Aa Zara Aa Zara"	Durga Natraj	Vinay Bihari	Soham Chakraborty		
Chameli	"Bheegi Hui Koi"	Sandesh Shandilya	Irshad Kamil	Javed Ali		
Chameli	"Jaane"	Sandesh Shandilya	Irshad Kamil	Udit Narayan		
Chameli	"Bhaage Re Mann"	Sandesh Shandilya	Irshad Kamil			
Chameli	"Jaane Kyun Humko"	Sandesh Shandilya	Irshad Kamil			
Chameli	"Sajna Ve Sajna"	Sandesh Shandilya	Irshad Kamil			
Chameli	"Yeh Lamha"	Sandesh Shandilya	R.N. Dubey			
Chori Chori	"Main Ek Ladki"	Sajid-Wajid	Anand Bakshi			
Chota Jadugar	"Skubi Dubi Du"	Sharreth	Sudhakar Sharma			
Chota Jadugar	"Kaun Hai Yeh"	Sharreth	Sudhakar Sharma			S. P. Balasubramaniam
Chota Jadugar	"Indradhanush"	Sharreth	Sudhakar Sharma			
Chura Liyaa Hai Tumne	"Boys Are Best"	Himesh Reshammiya	Jay Verma	Shaan		
Dabdaba	"Kar De Jaadoo Tona"	Dilip Dutta	Ravi Chopra			
Darna Mana Hai	"Darna Mana Hai"	Salim-Sulaiman	Lalit Marathe	Ninad Kamat		
Darna Mana Hai	"Darna Mix"	Salim-Sulaiman	Lalit Marathe	Naresh Kamath, Ninad Kamat		
Darna Mana Hai	"Jo Dar Gaya Woh Mar Gaya"	Salim-Sulaiman	Tabish Romani	Salim Merchant, Naresh Kamath		
Darna Mana Hai	"Stop"	Salim-Sulaiman	Abbas Tyrewala	Sonu Nigam		
Dhund	"Aas Paas" (Female Version)	Viju Shah	Ibrahim Ashq			
Dhund	"Dilbar Mera Aaya"	Viju Shah	Ibrahim Ashq	Udit Narayan		
Dil Pardesi Ho Gayaa	"Karachi Nahin Javangi"	Usha Khanna	Saawan Kumar Tak			
Dil Pardesi Ho Gayaa	"Mubarakaan"	Usha Khanna	Saawan Kumar Tak			
Dil Pardesi Ho Gayaa	"Mubarakaan" (Sad Version)	Usha Khanna	Saawan Kumar Tak			
Dil Pardesi Ho Gayaa	"Kudrat Ne Baksha"	Usha Khanna	Saawan Kumar Tak	Udit Narayan		
Escape from Taliban	"Fatwa With Kahan Se Aate"	Vanraj Bhatia	Mehboob Kotwal	Asha Bhosle		
Fun 2shh: Dudes in the 10th Century	"Hold, You Will Be Mine"	Pritam	Parveen Raj	KK, Shaan		
Janasheen	"Ishq Fitrat Hai Meri"	Anand Raj Anand	Dev Kohli	Sukhwinder Singh		
Janasheen	"Nashe Nashe Mein Yaar"	Anand Raj Anand	Tejpal Kaur	Adnan Sami		
Khanjar	"Bin Sajni Ke Jeevan"	Amar-Utpal	Anand Bakshi	Kumar Sanu		
Khanjar	"Haseen Raat Hai"	Amar-Utpal	Anand Bakshi	Vinod Rathod		
Khel – No Ordinary Game	"Chori Chori"	Dude	Faaiz Anwar	Shaan		
Khel – No Ordinary Game	"Tumko Kitna Hai Pyar"	Dude	Faaiz Anwar	Sonu Nigam		
Khushi	"Aaja Piya"	Anu Malik	Sameer			
Khushi	"Khushi Aayee Re Aayee Re"	Anu Malik	Sameer			
Kucch To Hai	"Aisa Kyon Hota Hai"	Anu Malik	Sameer	KK		
Kucch To Hai	"Ding Dong"	Anu Malik	Sameer	KK		
Kucch To Hai	"Hone Laga"	Anu Malik	Sameer	Priya Bhattacharya		
Kucch To Hai	"Yeh Mera Dil"	Anu Malik	Sameer	Shaan		
Kyon?	"Tadak Tadak"	Bhupen Hazarika	Prasoon Joshi	Dominique Cerejo, Sonu Nigam, KK		
Main Prem Ki Diwani Hoon	"Papa Ki Pari"	Anu Malik	Dev Kohli	Kareena Kapoor Khan		
Main Prem Ki Diwani Hoon	"Sanjana I Love You"	Anu Malik	Dev Kohli	K. S. Chithra, KK		
Market	"Khalliwalli" (Female Version)	Altaf Raja	Arun Bhairav	Hema Sardesai		
Market	"Meri Gali Mein Tera Aana" (Female Version)	Altaf Raja	Arun Bhairav			
Miss India	"Neendein"	Anand–Milind	Jalees Sherwani	Shaan		
Mumbai Se Aaya Mera Dost	"Saiyyan"	Anu Malik	Sameer			
Munna Bhai M.B.B.S.	"Dekh Le"	Anu Malik	Rahat Indori	Anu Malik		
Munna Bhai M.B.B.S.	"Dekh Le" (Remix Version)	Anu Malik	Rahat Indori	Anu Malik		
Oops!	"Bhadka De"	Ravi Pawar	Ajay Jhingran	KK		
Out Of Control	"USA Vich LA"	Anand Raj Anand	Dev Kohli	Shaan		
Paanch	"Main Khuda"	Vishal Bhardwaj	Abbas Tyrewala			
Raghu Romeo	"Strawberry Hoon Main"	Pritam	Sanjeev Sharma			
Raja Bhaiya	"Don't Touch"	Surendra Sodhi	Maan Singh Deep	Arvinder Singh		
Raja Bhaiya	185	Nadeem–Shravan	Sameer	Udit Narayan		
Sssshhh...	"Ishq Da Maara Hai"	Anu Malik	Dev Kohli	Sukhwinder Singh		
Stumped	"Humko Toh Hai Poora Yakeen"	Shamir Tandon, Sanjoy Chowdhury	Ajay Jhingran	KK, Sagarika, Shankar Mahadevan, Shrraddha Pandit, Shubha Mudgal, Shweta Pandit, Shweta Shetty, Sudesh Bhonsle		
Stumped	"Humko Toh Hai Poora Yakeen" (Remix Version)	Shamir Tandon, Sanjoy Chowdhury	Ajay Jhingran	KK, Shubha Mudgal, Sudesh Bhosle		
Supari	"Chaaha"	Vishal–Shekhar	Vishal Dadlani			
Supari	"Chand Chahiye"	Vishal–Shekhar	Vishal Dadlani	Vishal Dadlani		
The Hero: Love Story of a Spy	"In Mast Nigahon Se"	Uttam Singh	Anand Bakshi, Javed Akhtar	Udit Narayan, Amrish Puri		
Tumse Milke Wrong Number	"Rafta Rafta"	Daboo Malik	Praveen Bharadwaj	Daboo Malik		
Tumse Milke Wrong Number	"Wrong Number"	Daboo Malik	Praveen Bharadwaj	Daboo Malik		
Waisa Bhi Hota Hai Part II	"Jism"	Vishal–Shekhar	Virag Mishra			
Xcuse Me	"Yeh Tu Kya Kar Rahela Hai"	Sanjeev-Darshan	Abbas Katka	Abhijeet		

=== 2004 ===
Film	Song	Composer(s)	Writer(s)	Co-singer(s)	Ref.
Aan: Men at Work	"Nasha Nasha"	Anu Malik	Sameer		
Ab... Bas!	"Ishara Ishara"	Daboo Malik	Sameer		
Aetbaar	"Chhodo Chhodo"	Rajesh Roshan	Ibrahim Ashq	Udit Narayan	
Agnipankh	"Khamoshi"	Pritam	Sandeep Nath	Sonu Nigam	
Aitraaz	"Gela Gela Gela"	Himesh Reshammiya	Sameer	Adnan Sami	
Aitraaz	"Aitraaz - I Want to Make Love to You" (The Passion Mix Version)	Himesh Reshammiya	Sameer		
AK-47	"Nasha Nasha"	Sajid-Wajid	Jalees Sherwani		
Asambhav	"Koi Aayega"	Viju Shah	Sameer		
Balle Balle! From Amritsar To L.A.	"Lo Shaadi Aayi"	Anu Malik	Javed Akhtar	Alka Yagnik, Gayatri Ganjawala, Kunal Ganjawala, Anu Malik	
Bhola In Bollywood	"Main Ne Honton Pe"	Atamash	Wajida Tabassum	Shaan	
Charas: A Joint Operation	"Bambhole"	Raju Singh	Javed Akhtar		
Chot	"Paani Re Paani"	Raju Singh	Sudhakar Sharma	Adnan Sami	
Dhoom	"Dhoom Machaale"	Pritam	Sameer	Shankar Mahadevan	
Dil Maange More	"O Makhna Ve"	Himesh Reshammiya	Sameer	KK	
Dil Maange More	"Gustakh Dil Tere Liye"	Himesh Reshammiya	Sameer	Sonu Nigam	
Dukaan - The Body Shop	"Paanch Baje" (Female Version)	Altaf Raja	Arun Bhairav		
Ek Se Badhkar Ek	"Aankhon Hi Aankhon Mein"	Anand Raj Anand	Majrooh Sultanpuri	Kumar Sanu	
Garv	"Dum Mast Mast"	Sajid-Wajid	Jalees Sherwani	Sukhwinder Singh	
Garv	"Khaaya Piya"	Sajid-Wajid	Jalees Sherwani	Vinod Rathod	
Garv	"Saiyan Mora Saiyan"	Sajid-Wajid	Jalees Sherwani		
Garv	"Marhaba"	Anu Malik	Dev Kohli	Zubeen Garg	
Gayab	"Superman"	Ajay–Atul	Tabish Romani	Kunal Ganjawala	
Girlfriend	"Hamara Dil"	Daboo Malik	Anwar Sagar	Abhijeet	
Girlfriend	"Suno To Jaana"	Daboo Malik	Praveen Bharadwaj	Vaishali	
Hawas	"Alla Miya"	Daboo Malik	Praveen Bharadwaj	Daboo Malik	
Hawas	"Teri Chahat Mein" (Female Version)	Daboo Malik	Praveen Bharadwaj		
I Proud to Be an Indian	"Ajnabee Tum Lagte Nahin"	Daboo Malik	Jay Verma	Babul Supriyo	
Julie	"Ishq Tezab"	Himesh Reshammiya	Sameer	Jayesh Gandhi	
Khakee	"Aisa Jadoo"	Ram Sampath	Sameer		
Khakee	"Aisa Jadoo" (Remix Version)	Ram Sampath	Sameer		
Kismat	"Mahi Mahi Mahi"	Anand Raj Anand	Dev Kohli		
Kismat	"Sajna Se Milne Jaana"	Anand Raj Anand	Dev Kohli		
Kiss Kis Ko	"Mast Kalandar Meri Jawani"	Band Of Boys	P. K. Mishra		
Krishna Cottage	"Bindaas"	Anu Malik	Sanjay Chhel	Shaan	
Krishna Cottage	"Uff Yun Maa"	Anu Malik	Sanjay Chhel	Shaan	
Kucch Kaha Aapne	"Pyar Mohabbat Ishq Jawani"	Sajid–Wajid	Jalees Rashid		
Kyun! Ho Gaya Na...	"Main Hoon"	Shankar–Ehsaan–Loy	Javed Akhtar	Shaan	
Love in Nepal	"Bolo Kya Khayal Hai"	Vishal–Shekhar	Sameer	Sonu Nigam	
Love in Nepal	"Katra Katra"	Nikhil - Vinay	Sameer		
Madhoshi	"Yeh Ishq Hai Gunah"	Roop Kumar Rathod	Shakeel Azmi	Sukhwinder Singh	
Main Hoon Na	"Gori Gori"	Anu Malik	Javed Akhtar	Anu Malik, KK, Shreya Ghoshal	
Mujhse Shaadi Karogi	"Jeene Ke Hain Chaar Din"	Anu Malik	Sameer	Sonu Nigam	
Mujhse Shaadi Karogi	"Kar Doon Kamaal"	Sajid-Wajid	Jalees Sherwani	Sukhwinder Singh	
Mujhse Shaadi Karogi	"Mujhse Shaadi Karogi"	Sajid-Wajid	Jalees Sherwani	Sonu Nigam, Udit Narayan	
Musafir	"Phir Naa Kehna" (Crazy In Zanzibar Mix Version)	Vishal–Shekhar	Dev Kohli	Kumar Sanu	
Musafir	"Saaki" (Psychedelic Insomnia Mix Version)	Vishal–Shekhar	Dev Kohli	Sukhwinder Singh	
Musafir	"Ishq Kabhi Kario Na" (Female Version)	Vishal–Shekhar	Dev Kohli		
Paisa Vasool	"Paisa Vasool"	Bapi–Tutul	Sandeep Nath		
Plan	"Hota Hai Hota Hai"	Vishal–Shekhar	Kumaar	Kumar Sanu	
Plan	"Kaise Kaise"	Anand Raj Anand	Dev Kohli	Adnan Sami	
Poochho Mere Dil Se	"Poochho Mere Dil Se"	Tabun Sutradhar	—N/a	Shaan	
Popcorn Khao! Mast Ho Jao	"Dupatta Beimaan Re"	Vishal–Shekhar	Vishal Dadlani		
Popcorn Khao! Mast Ho Jao	"Move The Dupatta" (The Mix Version)	Vishal–Shekhar	Vishal Dadlani		
Popcorn Khao! Mast Ho Jao	"O Solemiya"	Vishal–Shekhar	Vishal Dadlani		
Rakht	"Oh! What A Babe"	Shamir Tandon	Ajay Jhingran		
Rok Sako To Rok Lo	"Nazron Ka Yaarana"	Jatin–Lalit	Prasoon Joshi	Shaan	
Rudraksh	"Ishq Hai Nasha Nasha"	Vishal–Shekhar	Sameer	Shaan	
Shaadi Ka Laddoo	"Bach Ke Rehna"	Vishal–Shekhar	Vishal Dadlani		
Shaadi Ka Laddoo	"Chal Hatt"	Vishal–Shekhar	Vishal Dadlani		
Shaadi Ka Laddoo	"Woh Kaun Hai"	Vishal–Shekhar	Vishal Dadlani		
Shikaar	"Jaane Jaana"	Anand Raj Anand	Dev Kohli		
Shikaar	"Nazar Nazar Nazar"	Anand Raj Anand	Dev Kohli		
Shikaar	"O Jiya Kya Kiya"	Anand Raj Anand	Dev Kohli	Anand Raj Anand, Udit Narayan, Vinod Rathod	
Shukriya: Till Death Do Us Apart	"Aankhon Aankhon Mein"	Vishal–Shekhar	Sameer	KK	
Stop!	"Abhi Nahi Aur Kabhi"	Vishal–Shekhar	Vishal Dadlani	Sowmya Raoh, Mahalaxmi Iyer, Shaan	
Stop!	"Nachle"	Vishal–Shekhar	Kumaar	Shaan	
Tauba Tauba	"Qurbaan Qurbaan"	Nitin Raikwar	Nitin Raikwar	Arun Daga	
Uuf Kya Jaadoo Mohabbat Hai	"Dekar Dil"	Sandesh Shandilya	Mehboob Kotwal	Vinod Rathod, KK, Runa	
Uuf Kya Jaadoo Mohabbat Hai	"Dost"	Sandesh Shandilya	Mehboob Kotwal	Kunal Ganjawala	
Uuf Kya Jaadoo Mohabbat Hai	"Uuf Kya Jaadoo Mohabbat Hai"	Sandesh Shandilya	Mehboob Kotwal		
Wajahh: A Reason to Kill	"Yeh Zamana"	Anand Raj Anand	Anand Raj Anand	Bob	
Woh	"Meri Mehfil Ka Rang"	Anand Raj Anand	Dev Kohli		

=== 2005 ===
Film	Song	Composer(s)	Writer(s)	Co-singer(s)	Ref.
7½ Phere	"Aao Nee Kudiyon"	Shantanu Moitra	Subrat Sinha		
Aashiq Banaya Aapne	"Dillagi Mein Jo Beet Jaaye"	Himesh Reshammiya	Mudassar Aziz	Shaan, Jayesh Gandhi, Sonu Nigam, Himesh Reshammiya, Vasundhara Das	
Aashiq Banaya Aapne	"Mar Jaavaan Mit Jaavaan"	Himesh Reshammiya	Sameer	Abhijeet Sawant	
Anjaane	"De Do Re De Do"	Himesh Reshammiya	Sameer	Jayesh Gandhi	
Bachke Rehna Re Baba	"Bach Ke Rehna Re Baba"	Anu Malik	Dev Kohli	Sowmya Raoh	
Bachke Rehna Re Baba	"Bach Ke Rehna Re Baba" (Remix Version)	Anu Malik	Dev Kohli	Sowmya Raoh	
Bachke Rehna Re Baba	"Eiffel Tower"	Anu Malik	Anu Malik		
Bad Friend	"Dabe Pav"	Nikhil-Vinay	Sunil Jogi	Sonu Nigam	
Bluffmaster!	"Right Here Right Now"	Vishal–Shekhar	Vishal Dadlani	Abhishek Bachchan	
Bluffmaster!	"Right Here Right Now" (Hip Hop Mix Version)	Vishal–Shekhar	Vishal Dadlani	Abhishek Bachchan	
Bluffmaster!	"Right Here Right Now" (Dhol Mix Version)	Vishal–Shekhar	Vishal Dadlani	Abhishek Bachchan	
Bunty Aur Babli	"Dhadak Dhadak"	Shankar–Ehsaan–Loy	Gulzar	Udit Narayan, Nihira Joshi	
Chaahat – Ek Nasha	"Mallika"	Anand Raj Anand	Praveen Bharadwaj		
Chaahat – Ek Nasha	"Dil Ki Baat"	Anand Raj Anand	Praveen Bharadwaj	Babul Supriyo, Shreya Ghoshal	
Chaahat – Ek Nasha	"Ishq Ki Raat"	Anand Raj Anand	Praveen Bharadwaj	Sonu Nigam, Shreya Ghoshal	
Chand Sa Roshan Chehra	"Jadugar Jadugar"	Jatin–Lalit	Sameer	Udit Narayan	
Chand Sa Roshan Chehra	"Pehli Nazar Ka Woh Pyar"	Jatin–Lalit	Sameer	Udit Narayan, Alka Yagnik	
Chetna: The Excitement	"Tum Aaj Mile Ho"	Daboo Malik	Praveen Bharadwaj	Sujata Majumdar	
Chocolate	"Bheega Bheega"	Pritam	Praveen Bharadwaj	Indee	
Chocolate	"Jhuki Jhuki"	Pritam	Dev Kohli	Kailash Kher	
Chocolate	"Mummy"	Pritam	Mayur Puri		
Chor Mandli	"Jugnu Jugnu"	Nirmal B. Pawar	Kumaar		
Classic Dance of Love	"Aa Mujhe Dekh" (Female Version)	Bappi Lahiri	Sameer		
Deewane Huye Paagal	"Tu Hai Tu Jigar"	Anu Malik	Sameer	Shaan	
Dhamkee: The Extortion	"Tapkayega"	Mahesh Sharma	Ramesh Dubey	Sudesh Bhonsle	
Dreams - Sapne Sach Honge	"Kaise Kate"	Sajid-Wajid	Jalees Sherwani		
Dus	"Cham Se"	Vishal–Shekhar	Panchhi Jalonvi	Sonu Nigam, Shaan, Babul Supriyo, Sapna Mukherjee, Akriti Kakar	
Dus	"Deedar De" (Nikhil Mix Version)	Vishal–Shekhar	Panchhi Jalonvi	Krishna Beura	
Dus	"Deedar De" (Ranjit Barot Mix Version)	Vishal–Shekhar	Panchhi Jalonvi	Krishna Beura	
Dus	"Saamne Aati Ho"	Vishal–Shekhar	Panchhi Jalonvi	Sonu Nigam	
Ek Ajnabee	"Soniye"	Amar Mohile	Sameer	KK	
Ek Ajnabee	"Soniye" (Mix N Match Remix)	Amar Mohile	Sameer	KK	
Ek Ajnabee	"Ek Ajnabee (Mama Told Me)"	Vishal–Shekhar	Vishal Dadlani	Sukhwinder Singh, Vishal Dadlani	
Ek Hi Bhool	"Dheere Dheere Haule Haule"	Dilip Sen-Sameer Sen	Tabish Romani		
Ek Hi Bhool	"Zindagi Mein Kya Maza Hai"	Dilip Sen-Sameer Sen	Tabish Romani		
Ek Khiladi Ek Haseena	"Ankhiyan Na Maar"	Pritam	Dev Kohli		
Ek Khiladi Ek Haseena	"Ankhiyan Na Maar" (Remix Version)	Pritam	Dev Kohli		
Ek Khiladi Ek Haseena	"Ishq Hai Jhootha"	Pritam	Mayur Puri	Kunal Ganjawala	
Ek Khiladi Ek Haseena	"Ishq Hai Jhootha" (Remix Version)	Pritam	Mayur Puri	Kunal Ganjawala	
Elaan	"Andarlu Mandarlu"	Anu Malik	Sameer	Shreya Ghoshal, Sonu Nigam, Anu Malik	
Elaan	"Andarlu Mandarlu" (Remix Version)	Anu Malik	Sameer	Shreya Ghoshal, Sonu Nigam, Anu Malik	
Elaan	"Dil Mein Hulchul"	Anu Malik	Sameer	KK, Kunal Ganjawala	
Elaan	"Dua Karna"	Anu Malik	Sameer		
Fareb	"Baras Ja"	Anu Malik	Sayeed Quadri		
Fun – Can Be Dangerous Sometimes	"Let's Have Fun"	Sanjeev–Darshan	Sunil Jogi		
Garam Masala	"Dill Samander"	Pritam	Sameer	KK	
Home Delivery	"Cuckoo Cuckoo"	Vishal–Shekhar	Vishal Dadlani	Shekhar Ravjiani	
Home Delivery	"Happy Diwali"	Vishal–Shekhar	Vishal Dadlani	Vaishali, Surthi, Divya, Suraj Jagan	
Home Delivery	"Happy Diwali" (Remix Version)	Vishal–Shekhar	Vishal Dadlani	Vaishali, Surthi, Divya, Suraj Jagan	
Home Delivery	"Khushbu Churati"	Vishal–Shekhar	Vishal Dadlani		
Hum Dum	"Lahaul Vila"	Sujeet-Rajesh	Iqbal	Shaan	
Insan	"Rain Rain" (Duet Version)	Himesh Reshammiya	Sameer	Shaan	
Insan	"Is Tarah Deewane"	Himesh Reshammiya	Sameer	Kunal Ganjawala	
Insan	"Rain Rain" (Solo Version)	Himesh Reshammiya	Sameer		
Iqbal	"Khelenge Khelenge" (Female Version)	Sukhwinder Singh	Subhash Ghai		
Jalwa - Fun in Love	"Jalwa Hai Ye Jalwa"	Laxmi-Vasant, Dilip Sen-Sameer Sen	Shabbir Ahmed		
Jalwa - Fun in Love	"Tere Ishq Ne Mujh Par"	Laxmi-Vasant, Dilip Sen-Sameer Sen	Shabbir Ahmed	Shadab Sabri	
James	"Hero"	Nitin Raikwar	Nitin Raikwar		
Jo Bole So Nihaal	"Main Yaar Punjabi Jatt"	Anand Raj Anand	Dev Kohli	Udit Narayan	
Jo Bole So Nihaal	"Raat Kuchh Aur Thi"	Anand Raj Anand	Dev Kohli		
Jo Bole So Nihaal	"Raat Kuchh Aur Thi" (Remix Version)	Anand Raj Anand	Dev Kohli		
Kaal	"Nassa Nassa"	Salim–Sulaiman	Anand Raj Anand	Sonu Nigam	
Kaal	"Tauba Tauba"	Salim–Sulaiman	Shabbir Ahmed	Sonu Nigam, Kunal Ganjawala, Richa Sharma	
Karam	"Ishq Nachaya Kare"	Vishal–Shekhar	Vishal Dadlani		
Kasak	"Yeh Zindagi"	M.M. Kreem	Sameer	Lucky Ali	
Khamoshh... Khauff Ki Raat	"Love Me Baby"	Jatin–Lalit	Sanjay Chhel		
Khamoshh... Khauff Ki Raat	"Man Bhanwara"	Jatin–Lalit	Sanjay Chhel		
Khamoshh... Khauff Ki Raat	"Man Bhanwara" (Remix Version)	Jatin–Lalit	Sanjay Chhel		
Khullam Khulla Pyaar Karen	"Khullam Khulla Pyaar Karen"	Anand–Milind	Sameer	Jolly Mukherjee	
Khullam Khulla Pyaar Karen	"Khullam Khulla Pyaar Karen" (Remix Version)	Anand–Milind	Sameer	Jolly Mukherjee	
Koi Aap Sa	"Aadat Ho Chuki"	Himesh Reshammiya	Sameer	Shaan	
Koi Aap Sa	"Aadat Ho Chuki" (Remix Version)	Himesh Reshammiya	Sameer	Shaan	
Koi Aap Sa	"Baandh Mere Pairon Mein"	Himesh Reshammiya	Sameer	Sonu Nigam	
Koi Aap Sa	"Baandh Mere Pairon Mein" (Remix Version)	Himesh Reshammiya	Sameer	Sonu Nigam, Jayesh Gandhi	
Kuchh Meetha Ho Jaye	"O Jaana Tenu Rab Da"	Himesh Reshammiya	Sameer	Kunal Ganjawala	
Kyaa Kool Hai Hum	"Chaska"	Anu Malik	Sameer	Kunal Ganjawala	
Kyaa Kool Hai Hum	"We Are Sabse Alag"	Anu Malik	Sameer	Kunal Ganjawala	
Kyaa Kool Hai Hum	"Jaago Na"	Anu Malik	Sameer	Sowmya Raoh, Gayatri Iyer	
Laila: A Mystery	"Laila"	Bappi Lahiri, Nikhil-Vinay	—N/a		
Laila: A Mystery	"Mehboob Mere"	Bappi Lahiri, Nikhil-Vinay	—N/a		
Laila: A Mystery	"Yeh Ladka"	Bappi Lahiri, Nikhil-Vinay	—N/a		
Main Aisa Hi Hoon	"Just Walk Into My Life"	Himesh Reshammiya	Sameer	Shaan	
Main Aisa Hi Hoon	"Teri Galiyon Se"	Himesh Reshammiya	Sameer	Jayesh Gandhi	
Maine Pyaar Kyun Kiya?	"Teri Meri Love Story"	Himesh Reshammiya	Sameer	Shaan, Babul Supriyo	
Maine Pyaar Kyun Kiya?	"Ye Ladki"	Himesh Reshammiya	Sameer	Kamal Khan	
Maine Pyaar Kyun Kiya?	"Ye Ladki" (Remix Version)	Himesh Reshammiya	Sameer	Kamal Khan	
Mashooka	"Mashooka Mashooka" (Hindi Version)	Sajid-Wajid	Jalees Sherwani		
Mashooka	"Pyar Karna"	Sajid-Wajid	Jalees Sherwani	Shaan	
Mazaa Mazaa	"Dance Dance"	Arun Daga	Vijay Akela	Arun Daga	
Meri Jung (Dubbed)	"La La La Hi Re"	Devi Sri Prasad	P. K. Mishra	Shaan	
Meri Jung (Dubbed)	"Mann Mein Tu Tan Mein Tu"	Devi Sri Prasad	P. K. Mishra	Shaan	
Mohabbat Ho Gayi Hai Tumse	"Saiyan Sanye Sanyoni"	Sanjeev-Darshan	Sameer		
Mr Prime Minister	"Chuimui Si Zindagi"	Darshan Dave	Darshan Dave		
Mr Prime Minister	"Yeh Samaa"	Bappi Lahiri	Kuku Prabhas		
Mumbai Xpress	"Aila Re" (Version 1)	Ilaiyaraaja	Dev Kohli	Shreya Ghoshal, Sonu Nigam, KK, Shaan	
Mumbai Xpress	"Aila Re" (Version 2)	Ilaiyaraaja	Dev Kohli	Shreya Ghoshal, Sonu Nigam, KK, Shaan	
Mumbai Xpress	"Bander Ki Dug Dugi"	Ilaiyaraaja	Dev Kohli	KK, Sonu Nigam, Shaan	
My Brother…Nikhil	"Aa Bhi Ja Aa Bhi Ja"	Vivek Philip	Amitabh Verma	Lucky Ali	
My Brother…Nikhil	"Mahiya"	Vivek Philip	Amitabh Verma		
My Brother…Nikhil	"Woh Kaun Hai"	Vivek Philip	Amitabh Verma		
My Brother…Nikhil	"Le Chale" (Version 3)	Vivek Philip	Amitabh Verma		
Nazar	"Pyar Asth"	Anu Malik	Sayeed Quadri		
Nazar	"Shor Machaale"	Anu Malik	Sayeed Quadri		
No Entry	"Kalyug Ki Laila"	Anu Malik	Sameer	Alisha Chinai, Vasundhara Das	
No Entry	"Mere Jaisa Koi Nahin"	Anu Malik	Sameer	Alisha Chinai	
Padmashree Laloo Prasad Yadav	"Jadoo"	Sukhwinder Singh	Sukhwinder Singh		
Paheli	"Phir Raat Kati"	M.M. Kreem	Gulzar	Sukhwinder Singh	
Paheli	"Phir Raat Kati" (Remix Version)	M.M. Kreem	Gulzar	Sukhwinder Singh	
Parineeta	"Kaisi Paheli Zindagani"	Shantanu Moitra	Swanand Kirkire		
Pyaar Mein Twist	"Ladki Gori Ya Kaali"	Jatin–Lalit	Sameer	Sonu Nigam	
Revati	"Bijli Se Daude Ang Mera"	Jatin–Lalit	Farooq A. Siddiqui		
Salaam Namaste	"Whats Goin' On"	Vishal–Shekhar	Jaideep Sahni	Kunal Ganjawala	
Sauda - The Deal	"Al Habibi"	Anand–Milind	Praveen Bharadwaj	Jolly Mukherjee	
Shaadi No. 1	"Dil Nahi Toda Karte"	Anu Malik	Sameer	Shaan	
Shabd	"Chahaton Ka Silsila" (Duet Version)	Vishal - Shekhar	Irshad Kamil	Kumar Sanu	
Shabd	"Khoya Khoya"	Vishal - Shekhar	Irshad Kamil	Sonu Nigam	
Shabd	"Sholon Si"	Vishal - Shekhar	Irshad Kamil	Vishal Dadlani	
Shabd	"Sholon Si" (Remix Version)	Vishal - Shekhar	Irshad Kamil	Vishal Dadlani	
Shikhar	"Dheere Dheere" (Female Version)	Viju Shah	Manohar Iyer		
Shikhar	"Fitna Dil"	Viju Shah	Chandrashekhar Rajit	Udit Narayan, KK	
Shikhar	"Fitna Dil" (Remix Version)	Viju Shah	Chandrashekhar Rajit	Udit Narayan, KK	
Silsiilay	"Belibaas"	Himesh Reshammiya	Sameer	Suzanne D'Mello, Jayesh Gandhi	
Silsiilay	"Meri Chandi Tu"	Himesh Reshammiya	Sameer	Suzanne D'Mello, Kailash Kher	
Socha Na Tha	"Abhi Abhi" (Version 1)	Sandesh Shandilya	Subrat Sinha	Sonu Nigam, Kunal Ganjawala	
Socha Na Tha	"Abhi Abhi" (Version 1)	Sandesh Shandilya	Subrat Sinha	Sonu Nigam, Kunal Ganjawala	
Socha Na Tha	"Zindagi"	Sandesh Shandilya	Irshad Kamil	Sonu Nigam, Lalit Bhushan	
Tezaab – The Acid of Love	"Tezaab Se"	Roop Kumar Rathod	Shakeel Azmi	Sukhwinder Singh	
The Film	"Dham Chik" (Version 2)	Samidha-Khalid	Samidha-Khalid	Roop Kumar Rathod, Suresh Wadkar	
The Film	"Khatra Khatra" (Female Version)	Siddharth-Suhas	Kumaar		
The Film	"Khatra Khatra" (Remix Version)	Siddharth-Suhas	Kumaar		
Topless	"De De Dil"	Bappi Lahiri	Meenu Singh	Vinod Rathod	
Topless	"Ve Main Kamli"	Bappi Lahiri	Meenu Singh		
Vaada	"Ud Ud Ud Ud Jaye"	Himesh Reshammiya	Sameer	Kailash Kher	
Waqt: The Race Against Time	"Chhup Jaa Chhup Jaa"	Anu Malik	Aatish Kapadia	Sonu Nigam	
Waqt: The Race Against Time	"Do Me A Favour Let's Play Holi"	Anu Malik	Aatish Kapadia	Anu Malik	
Waqt: The Race Against Time	"Miraksam"	Anu Malik	Aatish Kapadia	Sonu Nigam, Sudesh Bhonsle, Mahalakshmi Iyer	
Yakeen	"Bhoolna Nahin"	Himesh Reshammiya	Sameer	Shaan	
Yakeen	"Bhoolna Nahin" (Female Version)	Himesh Reshammiya	Sameer		

=== 2006 ===
Film	Song	Composer(s)	Writer(s)	Co-singer(s)	Ref.
36 China Town	"Aashiqui Meri"	Himesh Reshammiya	Sameer	Himesh Reshammiya	
36 China Town	"Aashiqui Meri" (Remix Version)	Himesh Reshammiya	Sameer	Himesh Reshammiya	
36 China Town	"24 X 7 Think of You"	Himesh Reshammiya	Sameer	Shaan	
36 China Town	"24 X 7 Think of You" (Remix Version)	Himesh Reshammiya	Sameer	Shaan	
Aap Ki Khatir	"Keh Do Naa"	Himesh Reshammiya	Sameer	Shaan	
Aap Ki Khatir	"Keh Do Naa" (Remix Version)	Himesh Reshammiya	Sameer	Shaan	
Aap Ki Khatir	"Meethi Meethi Baataan"	Himesh Reshammiya	Sameer	Kailash Kher, Jaspinder Narula	
Aap Ki Khatir	"Meethi Meethi Batan" (Remix Version)	Himesh Reshammiya	Sameer	Kailash Kher, Jaspinder Narula	
Aatma	"Baahon Mein Chhupa Lo Mujhe"	J. Gopal Prasad	Mukhhar		
Aatma	"Tere Chehre Se Nazar Nahi"	Anu Malik	Sameer	Sonu Nigam	
Ahista Ahista	"Tanha Tere Bagair"	Himesh Reshammiya	Irshad Kamil	KK	
Ahista Ahista	"Tanha Tere Bagair" (Remix Version)	Himesh Reshammiya	Irshad Kamil	KK	
Aisa Kyon Hota Hai?	"Ishq Dhamaka"	Tauseef Akhtar	Payam Sayeedi	Kunal Ganjawala, Sowmya Raoh	
Aksar	"Soniye"	Himesh Reshammiya	Sameer	KK	
Aksar	"Soniye" (Remix Version)	Himesh Reshammiya	Sameer	KK	
Aksar	"Loot Jayenge"	Himesh Reshammiya	Sameer	Kunal Ganjawala, Jayesh Gandhi	
Aksar	"Laagi Laagi"	Himesh Reshammiya	Sameer	Himesh Reshammiya	
Aksar	"Laagi Laagi" (Remix Version)	Himesh Reshammiya	Sameer	Himesh Reshammiya	
Anthony Kaun Hai?	"Ishq Kiya Kiya"	Himesh Reshammiya	Sameer	Himesh Reshammiya	
Anthony Kaun Hai?	"Ishq Kiya Kiya" (Remix Version)	Himesh Reshammiya	Sameer	Himesh Reshammiya	
Anthony Kaun Hai?	"Let's Rock"	Himesh Reshammiya	Sameer		
Anthony Kaun Hai?	"Let's Rock" (Remix Version)	Himesh Reshammiya	Sameer		
Apna Sapna Money Money	"Sania Badnaam"	Pritam	Shabbir Ahmed	Bob	
Banaras	"Ishq Mein Dilko" (Version 1)	Himesh Reshammiya	Sameer	Sonu Nigam	
Banaras	"Ishq Mein Dilko" (Version 2)	Himesh Reshammiya	Sameer	Sonu Nigam	
Bas Ek Pal	"Ashq Bhi Muskuraye"	Vivek Philip	Amitabh Verma	KK	
Bas Ek Pal	"Dheemey Dheemey"	Vivek Philip	Amitabh Verma	KK	
Bas Ek Pal	"Hai Ishq Ye Kya Ek Khata"	Pritam	Sameer	KK	
Bhagam Bhag	"Afreen"	Pritam	Sameer	KK	
Bhagam Bhag	"Afreen" (Remix Version)	Pritam	Sameer	KK	
Bhagam Bhag	"Tere Bin"	Pritam	Sameer	Kunal Ganjawala	
Bhagam Bhag	"Tere Bin" (Remix Version)	Pritam	Sameer	Kunal Ganjawala	
Bhagam Bhag	"Aa Kushi Se Khud Kushi Karle"	Pritam	Sameer		
Chingaari	"Dank Maare"	Aadesh Shrivastava	Sameer		
Chingaari	"Maha Kaali"	Aadesh Shrivastava	Sameer		
Chup Chup Ke	"Ghoomar"	Himesh Reshammiya	Sameer	KK	
Chup Chup Ke	"Ghoomar" (Remix Version)	Himesh Reshammiya	Sameer	KK	
Chup Chup Ke	"Aaya Re"	Himesh Reshammiya	Sameer	Kunal Ganjawala	
Chup Chup Ke	"Aaya Re" (Remix Version)	Himesh Reshammiya	Sameer	Kunal Ganjawala	
Darna Zaroori Hai	"Boo"	Tabish Romani	Tabish Romani		
Dhadkanein	"Chadhti Jawani"	Anand–Milind, Nazakat-Shujat	Farhad, Shabbir Ahmed		
Dhoom 2	"Crazy Kiya Re"	Pritam	Sameer		
Dhoom 2	"Crazy" (Remix Version)	Pritam	Sameer		
Don	"Ye Mera Dil"	Shankar–Ehsaan–Loy	Javed Akhtar		
Dor	"Imaan Ka Asar"	Salim–Sulaiman	Mir Ali Husain	Shreya Ghoshal	
Eight: The Power of Shani	"Teri Yaad Bahut Aane Lagi"	Daboo Malik	Praveen Bharadwaj	Arnab Chakrabarty	
Eight: The Power of Shani	"Teri Yaad Bahut Aane Lagi" (Love Mix Version)	Daboo Malik	Praveen Bharadwaj	Arnab Chakrabarty	
Eight: The Power of Shani	"Ishq Ishq"	Daboo Malik	Praveen Bharadwaj	Sonu Nigam	
Eight: The Power of Shani	"Ishq Ishq" (Dance Mix Version)	Daboo Malik	Praveen Bharadwaj	Sonu Nigam	
Fanaa	"Dekho Na"	Jatin–Lalit	Prasoon Joshi	Sonu Nigam	
Fanaa	"Mere Haath Mein"	Jatin–Lalit	Prasoon Joshi	Sonu Nigam, Aamir Khan, Kajol	
Game	"Marega Marega Bewafa Marega"	Bapi–Tutul	Sandeep Nath		
Gangster	"Lamha Lamha" (Duet Version)	Pritam	Neelesh Misra	Abhijeet	
Golmaal: Fun Unlimited	"Rehja Re"	Vishal–Shekhar	Kumaar	Javed Ali	
Golmaal: Fun Unlimited	"Rehja Re" (Remix Version)	Vishal–Shekhar	Kumaar	Javed Ali	
Hot Money	"Dhakkan Dhakka"	Bapi–Tutul	Sandeep Nath		
Hot Money	"Love Me Baby"	Bapi–Tutul	Sandeep Nath		
Hot Money	"Shara Ram Maria"	Bapi–Tutul	Sandeep Nath	Arnab Chakrabarty	
Humko Deewana Kar Gaye	"Mere Saath Chalte Chalte"	Anu Malik	Sameer	Shaan, Krishna Beura	
Humko Deewana Kar Gaye	"Rock Star"	Anu Malik	Sameer	Abhijeet, Anu Malik	
Husn - Love & Betrayal	"Nachu Main Nachu"	Aadesh Shrivastava	Sameer	Madhavi	
I See You	"Haalo Haalo"	Vishal-Shekhar	Vishal Dadlani	Sukhwinder Singh, Vishal Dadlani	
I See You	"Haalo Haalo" (Remix Version)	Vishal-Shekhar	Vishal Dadlani	Sukhwinder Singh, Vishal Dadlani	
I See You	"Sach Hui"	Vishal-Shekhar	Vishal Dadlani		
Iqraar by Chance	"Iqraar by Chance"	Sandesh Shandilya	Mehboob Kotwal	Sonu Nigam	
Iqraar by Chance	"Sari Sari Raat Jagave"	Sandesh Shandilya	Mehboob Kotwal	Vijay Prakash	
Iqraar by Chance	"Sari Sari Raat Jagave" (Remix Version)	Sandesh Shandilya	Mehboob Kotwal	Vijay Prakash	
Jaan-E-Mann	"Udh Jaana Bro"	Anu Malik	Gulzar	Kunal Ganjawala, Adnan Sami, Earl Edgar D'Souza	
Jaan-E-Mann	"Udh Jaana Bro" (Remix Version)	Anu Malik	Gulzar	Kunal Ganjawala, Adnan Sami, Earl Edgar D'Souza	
Jaane Hoga Kya	"Bechainiyaan Badhne Lagi"	Sajid-Wajid	Jalees-Rashid	Sukhwinder Singh	
Jawani Diwani: A Youthful Joyride	"Dilruba"	Sajid-Wajid	Shabbir Ahmed		
Kathputli	"Neele Asmaan"	Daboo Malik	Punnu Brar	Punnu Brar	
Krishna	"Brindavan"	Rajendra Shiv	—N/a	Rajendra Shiv	
Krishna	"Makhan Koi"	Rajendra Shiv	—N/a	Kumar Sanu	
Ladies Tailor	"Har Raat Teri"	Nishad Chandra	Ankit Sagar	Sonu Kakkar, Gayatri Ganjawala, Kunal Ganjawala	
Love Ke Chakkar Mein	"Ek Kamre Mein Hum Tum" (Female Version)	Anand Raj Anand	Dev Kohli		
Love Ke Chakkar Mein	"Ek Kamre Mein Hum Tum" (Duet Version)	Anand Raj Anand	Dev Kohli	Sonu Nigam	
Love Ke Chakkar Mein	"Fataafat Pyar Ho Gaya"	Anand Raj Anand	Praveen Bharadwaj	Sonu Nigam	
Manoranjan: The Entertainment	"U.P. Bihar Na Punjab"	Nayab, Raja	Sajanharharpuri		
Men Not Allowed	"Madhoshiyon Mein Hain Doobi"	Sanjeev Srivastava	Shaheen Iqbal	Shaan	
Mera Dil Leke Dekkho	"Mohabbat Kya Hai"	Jatin–Lalit	Sameer	Javed Ali, Mahalakshmi Iyer	
Mera Dil Leke Dekkho	"Nashe Mein Bheegi Raat Hai"	Jatin–Lalit	Sameer	Kunal Ganjawala	
Mera Dil Leke Dekkho	"Nashe Mein Bheegi" (The Dance Mix Version)	Jatin–Lalit	Sameer	Kunal Ganjawala	
Naughty Boy	"Uncho Uncho Mharo Ghagaro"	Daboo Malik	Praveen Bharadwaj	Daboo Malik, Vinod Rathod	
Naughty Boy	"Rag Rag Mein Teri Ada Ka Nasha"	Daboo Malik	Praveen Bharadwaj	Abhijeet Sawant	
Omkara	"Beedi"	Vishal Bhardwaj	Gulzar	Sukhwinder Singh, Nachiketa Chakraborty, Clinton Cerejo	
Omkara	"Beedi" (Remix Version)	Vishal Bhardwaj	Gulzar	Sukhwinder Singh, Nachiketa Chakraborty, Clinton Cerejo	
Phir Hera Pheri	"Dil De Diya"	Himesh Reshammiya	Sameer	Kunal Ganjawala, Arya Acharya	
Phir Hera Pheri	"Dil De Diya" (Remix Version)	Himesh Reshammiya	Sameer	Kunal Ganjawala, Arya Acharya	
Phir Hera Pheri	"Pyar Ki Chatni"	Himesh Reshammiya	Sameer		
Phir Hera Pheri	"Pyar Ki Chatni" (Remix Version)	Himesh Reshammiya	Sameer		
Pyaar Ke Side Effects	"Is This Love"	Pritam	Mayur Puri	Kunal Ganjawala	
Pyare Mohan	"Rabba De De Jawani"	Anu Malik	Sameer	Nikita Nigam	
Rocky – The Rebel	"Dil Rang Le"	Himesh Reshammiya	Sameer	Vinit	
Rocky – The Rebel	"Dil Rang Le" (Remix Version)	Himesh Reshammiya	Sameer	Vinit	
Saawan... The Love Season	"Punjabi Ankhonwali"	Aadesh Shrivastava	Saawan Kumar Tak	Shaan	
Saawan... The Love Season	"Saawan - The Love Season"	Aadesh Shrivastava	Saawan Kumar Tak	Shaan	
Shaadi Karke Phas Gaya Yaar	"Deewane Dil Ko Jaane Jaa"	Sajid-Wajid	Shabbir Ahmed	Sonu Nigam	
Shaadi Karke Phas Gaya Yaar	"Shaadi Karke Phas Gaya Yaar"	Sajid-Wajid	Shabbir Ahmed	Sonu Nigam	
Shaadi Karke Phas Gaya Yaar	"Tujhi Se"	Daboo Malik	Salim Bijnori		
Shaadi Se Pehle	"Ankhiyon Se Gal Kar Di"	Himesh Reshammiya	Sameer	Sukhwinder Singh, Sonu Nigam	
Shaadi Se Pehle	"Ankhiyon Se Gal Kar Di" (Remix Version)	Himesh Reshammiya	Sameer	Sukhwinder Singh, Sonu Nigam	
Shaadi Se Pehle	"Mundiya Aa"	Himesh Reshammiya	Sameer		
Shaadi Se Pehle	"Mundiya Aa" (Remix Version)	Himesh Reshammiya	Sameer		
Souten: The Other Woman	"Kuch Dard" (Solo Version)	Anand–Milind	Praveen Bharadwaj		
Souten: The Other Woman	"Kuch Dard" (Duet Version)	Anand–Milind	Praveen Bharadwaj	Abhijeet	
Souten: The Other Woman	"Souten Souten"	Anand–Milind	Praveen Bharadwaj	Richa Sharma	
Tathastu	"Mere Saath Chalte Chalte"	Vishal–Shekhar	Panchhi Jalonvi	Shaan, Krishna Beura	
Taxi No. 9211	"Ek Nazar Mein Bhi"	Vishal–Shekhar	Vishal Dadlani	KK	
The Killer	"Yaar Piya"	Sajid-Wajid	Jalees Sherwani		
Tom, Dick, and Harry	"Chheena Re Chheena"	Himesh Reshammiya	Sameer	Arya Acharya	
Tom, Dick, and Harry	"Chheena Re Chheena" (Remix Version)	Himesh Reshammiya	Sameer	Arya Acharya	
Umar	"Aankhon Mein Tum"	Shamir Tandon	Shaily Shailendra	Hariharan	
Unns: Love... Forever	"Sanson Mein Bheegi Hui Raat Ko"	Sujeet Shetty	Shaheen Iqbal	Hariharan	
Yun Hota Toh Kya Hota	"Yun Hota to Kya Hota"	Viju Shah	Sameer	Kunal Ganjawala	
Zindaggi Rocks	"Rabbi"	Anu Malik	Mudassar Aziz	Zubeen Garg, Krishna Beura	
Zindaggi Rocks	"Rabbi" (Remix Version)	Anu Malik	Mudassar Aziz	Zubeen Garg, Krishna Beura	
Zindaggi Rocks	"Ek Din Fursat"	Anu Malik	Mudassar Aziz		
Zindaggi Rocks	"Ek Din Fursat" (Remix Version)	Anu Malik	Mudassar Aziz		
Zindaggi Rocks	"Hadh Ko Aadab Ko"	Anu Malik	Sayeed Quadri		
Zindaggi Rocks	"Hadh Ko Aadab Ko" (Remix Version)	Anu Malik	Sayeed Quadri		
Zindaggi Rocks	"Humko Chhoone Paas Aaiye"	Anu Malik	Sayeed Quadri		

=== 2007 ===
Film	Song	Composer(s)	Writer(s)	Co-singer(s)	Ref.
Aag	"Hai Aag Yeh"	Amar Mohile	Sarim Momin		
Aag	"Ruk Ja"	Amar Mohile	Sajid Khan, Farhad Wadia	Vinod Rathod	
Aag	"Mehbooba Mehbooba"	Ganesh Hegde	Shabbir Ahmed	Amitabh Bachchan, Sukhwinder Singh	
Aag	"Mehbooba Mehbooba" (Remix Version by DJ A-Myth)	Ganesh Hegde	Shabbir Ahmed	Amitabh Bachchan, Sukhwinder Singh	
Aaja Nachle	"Aaja Nachle"	Salim–Sulaiman	Piyush Mishra		
Aaja Nachle	"Nachle" (Reprise Version)	Salim–Sulaiman	Piyush Mishra		
Aaja Nachle	"Koi Patthar Se Naa Maare"	Salim–Sulaiman	Piyush Mishra	Shreya Ghoshal, Sonu Nigam	
Aaja Nachle	"Soniye Mil Ja"	Salim–Sulaiman	Piyush Mishra	Sukhwinder Singh, Madhuri Dixit	
Aap Kaa Surroor	"Tanhaiyaan"	Himesh Reshammiya	Sameer	Himesh Reshammiya	
Aap Kaa Surroor	"Tanhaiyaan" (Unplugged Version)	Himesh Reshammiya	Sameer	Himesh Reshammiya	
Aap Kaa Surroor	"Tere Bina" (Remix Version by DJ Akbar Sami)	Himesh Reshammiya	Sameer	Himesh Reshammiya	
Aap Kaa Surroor	"Ya Ali"	Himesh Reshammiya	Sameer	Himesh Reshammiya	
Aap Kaa Surroor	"Ya Ali" (Electro Mix Version by DJ Akbar Sami)	Himesh Reshammiya	Sameer	Himesh Reshammiya	
Aap Kaa Surroor	"Ya Ali" (Remix Version by DJ Akbar Sami)	Himesh Reshammiya	Sameer	Himesh Reshammiya	
Apna Asmaan	"Dil Ka Tarana"	Leslie Lewis	Mehboob Kotwal	Shaan	
Big Brother	"Baalam Tera Nakhra"	Sandesh Shandilya	Neelesh Misra		
Buddha Mar Gaya	"Buddha Mar Gaya - Title Track"	Bappi Lahiri	Manoj Muntashir	Kunal Ganjawala, Shaan	
Cash	"Cash"	Vishal–Shekhar	Vishal Dadlani	Vishal Dadlani, Shekhar Ravjiani	
Cash	"Cash" (Extended Mix Version)	Vishal–Shekhar	Vishal Dadlani	Vishal Dadlani, Shekhar Ravjiani	
Cash	"Naa Puchho"	Vishal–Shekhar	Vishal Dadlani	Vishal Dadlani	
Cash	"Rehem Kare"	Vishal–Shekhar	Vishal Dadlani	Vishal Dadlani	
Cash	"Mind Blowing Mahiya"	Vishal–Shekhar	Vishal Dadlani		
Chhodon Naa Yaar	"Jhoom Le"	Anand Raj Anand	Panchhi Jalonvi		
Chhodon Naa Yaar	"Talwar Re"	Anand Raj Anand	Anand Raj Anand	Daler Mehndi	
Chhodon Naa Yaar	"Talwar" (Dhol Mix Version)	Anand Raj Anand	Anand Raj Anand		
Chhodon Naa Yaar	"Talwar" (Remix Version)	Anand Raj Anand	Anand Raj Anand		
Darling	"Aa Khushi Se Khudkushi Kar Le"	Pritam	Sameer	Shaan	
Darling	"Aa Khushi Se Khudkushi Kar Le" (Remix Version)	Pritam	Sameer	Shaan	
Dharm	"Boo"	Taabish Romani	Taabish Romani		
Dhol	"Haadsa"	Pritam	Irshad Kamil	Akriti Kakar	
Dil Dosti Etc	"Sambhaalo Dil Ko"	Siddharth-Suhas	Kumaar		
Dus Kahaniyaan	"Jaaniye"	Gourav Dasgupta	Virag Mishra		
Dus Kahaniyaan	"Jaaniye" (Remix Version)	Gourav Dasgupta	Virag Mishra		
Eklavya: The Royal Guard	"The Killing"	Shantanu Moitra	Swanand Kirkire	Pranab Biswas	
Go	"Oooh"	Sneha Khanwalkar, Amar Mohile	Milind Gadagkar	Vinod Rathod	
Good Boy, Bad Boy	"Aashiqana Aalam Hai"	Himesh Reshammiya	Sameer	Himesh Reshammiya, Vinit, Alka Yagnik	
Good Boy, Bad Boy	"Aashiqana Aalam Hai" (Remix Version)	Himesh Reshammiya	Sameer	Himesh Reshammiya, Vinit, Alka Yagnik	
Honeymoon Travels Pvt. Ltd.	"Pyaar Ki Yeh Kahani"	Vishal–Shekhar	Javed Akhtar	Gayatri Ganjawala	
Honeymoon Travels Pvt. Ltd.	"Sajnaaji Vaari Vaari"	Vishal–Shekhar	Javed Akhtar	Shekhar Ravjiani	
Jahan Jaaeyega Hamen Paaeyega	"Naa Chhoo Naa"	Aadesh Shrivastava	Nusrat Badr	Udit Narayan	
Jhoom Barabar Jhoom	"JBJ"	Shankar–Ehsaan–Loy	Gulzar	Zubeen Garg, Shankar Mahadevan	
Just Married	"Baat Pakki"	Pritam	Gulzar	Shaan, Mahalakshmi Iyer, Sukhwinder Singh	
Just Married	"Baat Pakki" (Remix Version)	Pritam	Gulzar	Shaan, Mahalakshmi Iyer, Sukhwinder Singh	
Just Married	"Gudgudee"	Pritam	Gulzar		
Just Married	"Ram Milaye Jodi"	Pritam	Gulzar	Sukhwinder Singh, Shaan	
Khallas: The Beginning of End	"Sabse Haseen"	Suresh Raheja	A.M. Turaz		
Khallas: The Beginning of End	"Rab Di Kasam"	Suresh Raheja	A.M. Turaz	Udit Narayan	
Kudiyon Ka Hai Zamana	"Kudiyon Ka Hai Zamana"	Iqbal Darbar, Yasin Darbar	Sahil Sultanpuri	Jaspinder Narula	
Kudiyon Ka Hai Zamana	"Kudiyon Ka Hai Zamana" (Remix Version)	Iqbal Darbar, Yasin Darbar	Sahil Sultanpuri	Jaspinder Narula	
Laaga Chunari Mein Daag	"Hum To Aise Hain"	Shantanu Moitra	Swanand Kirkire	Shreya Ghoshal, Swanand Kirkire, Pranab Biswas	
Laaga Chunari Mein Daag	"Kachchi Kaliyaan"	Shantanu Moitra	Swanand Kirkire	KK, Sonu Nigam	
Life Mein Kabhie Kabhiee	"Gehra Gehra"	Lalit Pandit	Sameer		
Life Mein Kabhie Kabhiee	"Valha Valha"	Lalit Pandit	Sameer	Shaan, Mahalaxmi Iyer, Shamit	
Mr. Hot Mr. Kool	"Hot Cool" (Techno Mix Version)	Rishi Sundd	Mani	Kunal Ganjawala	
Mr. Hot Mr. Kool	"Mr. Hot Mr. Kool"	Rishi Sundd	Mani	Kunal Ganjawala	
Namastey London	"Yahi Hota Pyaar"	Himesh Reshammiya	Javed Akhtar	Himesh Reshammiya	
Namastey London	"Yahi Hota Pyaar" (Mehfil Mix Version)	Himesh Reshammiya	Javed Akhtar	Himesh Reshammiya	
Namastey London	"Yahi Hota Pyaar" (Remix Version)	Himesh Reshammiya	Javed Akhtar	Himesh Reshammiya	
Nanhe Jaisalmer	"Lamha Lamha"	Himesh Reshammiya	Sameer	Himesh Reshammiya	
Nanhe Jaisalmer	"Lamha Lamha" (Remix Version)	Himesh Reshammiya	Sameer	Himesh Reshammiya	
Naqaab	"Aye Dil Paagal Mere" (Reprise)	Pritam	Sameer		
Nehlle Pe Dehlla	"Bottle Mein Main"	Daboo Malik	Salim Bijnori	Abhijeet, Vinod Rathod	
Nehlle Pe Dehlla	"Imaan Dol Jayega"	Daboo Malik	Dev Kohli	Vinod Rathod	
No Smoking	"Jab Bhi" (Trance Version)	Vishal Bhardwaj	Gulzar		
Om Shanti Om	"Deewangi Deewangi"	Vishal–Shekhar	Javed Akhtar	Shaan, Udit Narayan, Shreya Ghoshal, Rahul Saxena	
Om Shanti Om	"Deewangi" (Rainbow Mix Version)	Vishal–Shekhar	Javed Akhtar	Shaan, Udit Narayan, Shreya Ghoshal, Rahul Saxena	
Partner	"Maria Maria"	Sajid-Wajid	Jalees Sherwani	Sonu Nigam, Sajid Khan, Naresh Iyer	
Raqeeb	"Dushmana" (Female Version)	Pritam	Sameer		
Sarhad Paar	"Ae Zindagi" (Happy Version)	Anand Raj Anand	Dev Kohli	Wadali Brothers	
Shakalaka Boom Boom	"Aaj Nahi Toh Kal"	Himesh Reshammiya	Sameer	Shaan	
Shakalaka Boom Boom	"Thaare Vaaste"	Himesh Reshammiya	Sameer	Shaan	
Shakalaka Boom Boom	"Thaare Vaaste" (Remix Version)	Himesh Reshammiya	Sameer	Shaan	
Shakalaka Boom Boom	"Saathiya"	Himesh Reshammiya	Sameer	Kunal Ganjawala	
Shakalaka Boom Boom	"Tere Sona Sona Roop"	Himesh Reshammiya	Sameer	Kunal Ganjawala	
Shootout at Lokhandwala	"Mere Yaar"	Anand Raj Anand	Dev Kohli	Anand Raj Anand	
Speed	"Hello"	Pritam	Mayur Puri	Shaan	
Speed	"Wanna Wanna"	Pritam	Mayur Puri	Shaan	
Strangers	"Sulgi Huyee Saasein Meri"	Vinay Tiwari	Javed Akhtar		
Ta Ra Rum Pum	"Hey Shona"	Vishal–Shekhar	Javed Akhtar	Shaan	
Fear	Fear Title Track	Himesh Reshammiya	Sameer Anjaan		

=== 2008 ===
Film	Song	Composer(s)	Writer(s)	Co-singer(s)	Ref.
Anamika	"Aayo Re"	Anu Malik	Sameer		
Anamika	"Aayo Re" (Remix Version)	Anu Malik	Sameer		
Anamika	"Laagee Lagan"	Anu Malik	Sameer	Krishna Beura	
Anamika	"Saath"	Anu Malik	Sameer	Anu Malik	
Anamika	"Saath" (Remix Version)	Anu Malik	Sameer	Anu Malik	
Bachna Ae Haseeno	"Lucky Boy"	Vishal–Shekhar	Anvita Dutt Guptan	Hard Kaur, Raja Hasan	
Bombay to Bangkok	"Dil Ka Haal Sune Dil Wala"	Pritam	Shabbir Ahmed	Sonu Nigam	
C Kkompany	"Speaker Baje"	Anand Raj Anand	Anand Raj Anand	Anand Raj Anand, Sanjay Dutt	
C Kkompany	"Speaker Baje" (Dhol Mix Version)	Anand Raj Anand	Anand Raj Anand	Anand Raj Anand, Sanjay Dutt	
Camp Rock	"Kuch Hai Dil Mein"	John Stewart	Irfan Siddiqui		
Camp Rock	"Khush Hoon Main"	John Stewart	Irfan Siddiqui		
Camp Rock	"Jeeye Hum Har Lamha"	John Stewart	Irfan Siddiqui		
Camp Rock	"We Rock"	John Stewart	Irfan Siddiqui	Aasma (Band)	
De Taali	"De Taali"	Vishal–Shekhar	Vishal Dadlani	Shaan	
De Taali	"De Taali" (The Clap Trap Mix Version)	Vishal–Shekhar	Vishal Dadlani	Shaan	
De Taali	"Everybody Put Your Hands Together"	Vishal–Shekhar	Vishal Dadlani	Anushka Manchanda, Shaan	
De Taali	"Tooti Phooti"	Vishal–Shekhar	Vishal Dadlani	Shaan, KK	
Dhoom Dadakka	"Hari Om"	Roop Kumar Rathod	Shakeel Azmi		
Dhoom Dadakka	"Hari Om" (Remix Version)	Roop Kumar Rathod	Shakeel Azmi		
Dostana	"Desi Girl"	Vishal–Shekhar	Kumaar	Shankar Mahadevan, Vishal Dadlani	
Dostana	"Shut Up & Bounce"	Vishal–Shekhar	Anvita Dutt Guptan	Vishal Dadlani	
Drona	"Bandagi"	Dhruv Ghanekar	Vaibhav Modi	Roop Kumar Rathod	
Drona	"Oop Cha"	Dhruv Ghanekar	Vaibhav Modi	Nandini Srikar	
Drona	"Oop Cha" (Remix Version)	Dhruv Ghanekar	Vaibhav Modi	Nandini Srikar	
Drona	"Drona" (Female Version)	Dhruv Ghanekar	Vaibhav Modi		
EMI	"Chori Chori"	Chirantan Bhatt	Shakeel Azmi	Suzanne D'Mello	
EMI	"Chori Chori" (Remix Version)	Chirantan Bhatt	Shakeel Azmi	Suzanne D'Mello	
Ghatothkach	"Aana Aaja Na"	Singeetam Srinivasa Rao	Sameer	Sudesh Bhonsle	
God Tussi Great Ho	"Let's Party"	Sajid-Wajid	Jalees Sherwani	Shaan	
God Tussi Great Ho	"Let's Party" (Remix Version)	Sajid-Wajid	Jalees Sherwani	Shaan	
Good Luck!	"Good Luck"	Anu Malik	Sameer	Adnan Sami	
Good Luck!	"Good Luck" (Club Mix Version)	Anu Malik	Sameer	Adnan Sami	
Gumnaam – The Mystery	"Zaalim Ishq"	Nadeem–Shravan	Sameer	Shaan	
Haal-e-Dil	"Khwahish"	Anand Raj Anand	Aditya Dhar	Raghav Sachar, Shaan	
Hari Puttar: A Comedy of Terrors	"Tutari"	Aadesh Shrivastava, Guru Sharma	Sameer	Sukhwinder Singh	
Hari Puttar: A Comedy of Terrors	"Tutari" (Remix Version)	Aadesh Shrivastava, Guru Sharma	Sameer	Sukhwinder Singh	
Hastey Hastey	"Hastey Hastey" (Happy Version)	Anu Malik	Sameer	Shivaram Kumar	
Hastey Hastey	"Hastey Hastey" (Sad Version)	Anu Malik	Sameer	Shivaram Kumar	
Hastey Hastey	"New Age Mantra" (Version 1)	Anu Malik	Sameer	Kunal Ganjawala	
Hastey Hastey	"Rock The World"	Anu Malik	Sameer	Shaan	
Hastey Hastey	"New Age Mantra" (Version 2)	Anu Malik	Sameer		
Hastey Hastey	"Hum Hain Tum Ho"	Anu Malik	Sameer		
Hastey Hastey	"Rock The World" (Female Version)	Anu Malik	Sameer		
Hello	"Apne Rab Ka Banda"	Sajid-Wajid	Jalees Sherwani	Sonu Nigam, Zubeen Garg	
Hello	"Karle Baby Dance Wance"	Sajid-Wajid	Jalees Sherwani	Daler Mehndi	
Hijack	"Dekh Dekh"	Justin-Uday	Kumaar	Suraj Jagan	
Hijack	"Dekh Dekh" (Club Mix Version)	Justin-Uday	Kumaar	Suraj Jagan	
Humsey Hai Jahaan	"Baaton Mein"	Abuzar, Siddharth - Suhas	Kumaar, Tajdar Amrohi	Shaan	
Humsey Hai Jahaan	"Hum Lakh Chhupayein"	Abuzar, Siddharth - Suhas	Kumaar, Tajdar Amrohi	Kumar Sanu	
Humne Jeena Seekh Liya	Mera Yaar Tu	Pranit Gedham		Kailash Kher	
Karzzzz	"Tandoori Nights"	Himesh Reshammiya	Sameer	Himesh Reshammiya	
Karzzzz	"Tandoori Nights" (Club, Lounge Mix Version)	Himesh Reshammiya	Sameer	Himesh Reshammiya	
Khushboo	"Badi Albeli Hai Tu"	Adnan Sami	Javed Akhtar	Udit Narayan	
Khushboo	"Badi Albeli Hai Tu" (Gud Mix Version)	Adnan Sami	Javed Akhtar	Udit Narayan	
Khushboo	"Dil Yeh Kahe"	Adnan Sami	Javed Akhtar	Shaan	
Khushboo	"Dil Yeh Kahe" (Club Mix Version)	Adnan Sami	Javed Akhtar	Shaan	
Kidnap	"Meri Ek Ada Shola"	Pritam	Mayur Puri	Sukhwinder Singh, Akriti Kakar	
Kismat Konnection	"Soniye Ve"	Pritam	Shabbir Ahmed	Sonu Nigam	
Kismat Konnection	"Soniye Ve" (Remix Version)	Pritam	Shabbir Ahmed	Sonu Nigam	
Kool Nahin Hot Hain Hum	"Kali Kali"	Siddhant Madhavan	Yusuf Khan, Pinku Dubey		
Krazzy 4	"Dekhta Hai Tu Kya"	Rajesh Roshan	Javed Akhtar	Keerthi Sagathia	
Krazzy 4	"Dekhta Hai Tu Kya" (Remix Version)	Rajesh Roshan	Javed Akhtar	Keerthi Sagathia	
Maan Gaye Mughal-e-Azam	"Ishquiyaan"	Anu Malik	Sanjay Chhel	Sonu Nigam, Aftab Sabri, Hashim Sabri	
Meerabai Not Out	"O Dil Sambhal"	Sandesh Shandilya	Soumik Sen	Shaan	
Mere Baap Pehle Aap	"Shamma Shamma"	Vidyasagar	Sameer		
Mission Istaanbul	"Yaar Mera Dildaara"	Anu Malik	Sameer	Javed Ali	
Money Hai Toh Honey Hai	"Chhuriyaan"	Nitz 'N' Sony	Sameer	Labh Janjua	
Money Hai Toh Honey Hai	"Rangeeli Raat"	Nitz 'N' Sony	Sameer	Daler Mehndi, Master Saleem, Arya Acharya	
Mudrank	"Mohabbat Cigarette Ka Hai Dhuan"	Bappi Lahiri	Shakir Shaikh	Bappi Lahiri	
Mudrank	"Mumbai Ke Bhai"	Bappi Lahiri	Shakir Shaikh		
My Name is Anthony Gonsalves	"Tere Bina"	Pritam	Sameer		
My Name is Anthony Gonsalves	"Tum Mile"	Pritam	Sameer	KK	
My Name is Anthony Gonsalves	"Tum Mile" (Remix Version)	Pritam	Sameer	KK	
My Name is Anthony Gonsalves	"Ya Baba"	Pritam	Sameer	Shaan	
My Name is Anthony Gonsalves	"Ya Baba" (Remix Version)	Pritam	Sameer	Shaan	
One Two Three	"I Wanna Guy"	Raghav Sachar	Aditya Dhar, Munna Dhiman		
One Two Three	"Rock Mahi"	Raghav Sachar	Aditya Dhar, Munna Dhiman	Raghav Sachar	
Pranali	"Sakhiyaan"	Kailash Kher	Anil Pandey	Shreya Ghoshal, Mahalakshmi Iyer, Richa Sharma	
Rab Ne Bana Di Jodi	"Dance Pe Chance"	Salim–Sulaiman	Jaideep Sahni	Labh Janjua	
Rab Ne Bana Di Jodi	"Dancing Jodi"	Salim–Sulaiman	Jaideep Sahni	Labh Janjua	
Race	"Dekho Nashe Mein"	Pritam	Sameer	Shaan, KK	
Race	"Dekho Nashe Mein" (Asian RnB Mix Version)	Pritam	Sameer	Shaan, KK	
Race	"Dekho Nashe Mein" (Latin Feista Mix Version)	Pritam	Sameer	Shaan, KK	
Race	"Mujh Pe Jadoo"	Pritam	Sameer	Taz, Apache Indian	
Race	"Mujh Pe Jadoo" (Remix Version)	Pritam	Sameer	Taz, Apache Indian	
Race	"Race Is On My Mind"	Pritam	Sameer	Neeraj Shridhar	
Race	"Race Is On My Mind" (Remix Version)	Pritam	Sameer	Neeraj Shridhar	
Race	"Race Saason Ki"	Pritam	Sameer	Neeraj Shridhar	
Race	"Race Saason Ki" (Remix Version)	Pritam	Sameer	Neeraj Shridhar	
Rafoo Chakkar	"Aa Saari Raat Jagado"	Lalit Pandit	Salim Bijnori	Neeraj Shridhar	
Roadside Romeo	"Chhoo Le Na"	Salim-Sulaiman	Jaideep Sahni	Sudesh Bhosle, KK	
Roadside Romeo	"Chhoo Le Na" (Moonlight Club Mix Version)	Salim-Sulaiman	Jaideep Sahni	Sudesh Bhosle, KK	
Ru Ba Ru	"Manchali"	Satyadev Barman	Soumik Sen		
Ru Ba Ru	"Mitti Ki Khushboo"	Satyadev Barman	Soumik Sen	Kunal Ganjawala	
Ru Ba Ru	"Tere Bina Hori"	Satyadev Barman	Soumik Sen	Shravan Suresh, Sneha Suresh	
Shaurya	"Dheere Dheere"	Adnan Sami, Surendra Sodhi	Javed Akhtar, Jaydeep Sarkar	Adnan Sami	
Shaurya	"Ghabra Ke Dar Dar Ke"	Adnan Sami, Surendra Sodhi	Javed Akhtar, Jaydeep Sarkar	Adnan Sami	
Shaurya	"Jaane Kyun Jaaneman"	Adnan Sami, Surendra Sodhi	Javed Akhtar, Jaydeep Sarkar		
Sorry Bhai!	"Pal"	Gaurav Dayal	Amitabh Verma	Abhishek Nailwal	
Sorry Bhai!	"Pal" (Remix Version)	Gaurav Dayal	Amitabh Verma	Abhishek Nailwal	
Sorry Bhai!	"Sorry Bhai!"	Vivek Philip	Amitabh Verma	Abhishek Nailwal, KK	
Summer	"Baalon Mein Sone Wali"	Gourav Dasgupta	Vibha Singh	Gourav Dasgupta	
Sunday	"Loot Liya"	Daler Mehndi	Daler Mehndi	Daler Mehndi	
Superstar	"Mazya Naadi Kuni Lagu Naka"	Shamir Tandon	Vibha Singh	Adnan Sami	
Tashan	"Chhaliya"	Vishal–Shekhar	Anvita Dutt Guptan	Piyush Mishra	
Tashan	"Dil Dance Maare"	Vishal–Shekhar	Vishal Dadlani	Sukhwinder Singh, Udit Narayan	
Thoda Pyaar Thoda Magic	"Bulbula"	Shankar Mahadevan	Shankar–Ehsaan–Loy	Prasoon Joshi	
U Me Aur Hum	"Phatte"	Vishal Bhardwaj	Munna Dhiman	Adnan Sami	
U Me Aur Hum	"Saiyaan"	Vishal Bhardwaj	Munna Dhiman	Adnan Sami	
Ugly Aur Pagli	"Yeh Nazar"	Anu Malik	Amitabh Verma	Shaan	
Via Darjeeling	"Kahin Nahin" (Version 1)	Prabuddha Banerjee	Vibha Singh		
Wafa: A Deadly Love Story	"Raaste Roshan Hue"	Ravi Pawar, Sayed Ahmed	Shahab Allahabadi	Rahul Vaidya	
Welcome to Sajjanpur	"Dildara"	Shantanu Moitra	Ashok Mishra	Sonu Nigam	

=== 2009 ===
Film	Song	Composer(s)	Writer(s)	Co-singer(s)	Ref.
3 Nights 4 Days	"Dosti Forever"	Daboo Malik	Panchhi Jalonvi	Shaan	
3 Nights 4 Days	"Khwahishein"	Daboo Malik	Panchhi Jalonvi	Daboo Malik	
3 Nights 4 Days	"Sheesha"	Daboo Malik	Panchhi Jalonvi	Neeraj Shridhar	
42 Kms	"Tumse Milke Hua"	Tubby-Parik	Shahab Allahabadi	Shaan	
99	"Kal Ki Tarah"	Ashu	Vaibhav Modi	Shaan	
99	"What's Up"	Shamir Tandon	Shabbir Ahmed	KK	
99	"What's Up" (Grooving Blues Mix Version)	Shamir Tandon	Shabbir Ahmed	KK	
99	"What's Up" (Dance Mix Version)	Shamir Tandon	Shabbir Ahmed	Raaj Gopal Iyer	
Aa Dekhen Zara	"Gazab"	Pritam	Irshad Kamil	Shaan	
Aa Dekhen Zara	"Gazab" (Remix Version)	Pritam	Irshad Kamil	Shaan	
Aa Dekhen Zara	"Rock The Party"	Gourav Dasgupta	Sheershak Anand	Shweta Vijay	
Aagey Se Right	"Hippie" (Remix Version)	Amartya Rahut	Hitesh Kewalya	Keerthi Sagathia, Amartya Rahut	
Aagey Se Right	"Hippie Tu Jhoom"	Amartya Rahut	Hitesh Kewalya	Keerthi Sagathia, Amartya Rahut	
Aao Wish Karein	"Sabse Peeche Kyon Khade"	Ankur Tewari, Mikey McCleary	Ankur Tewari		
Aao Wish Karein	"Tum Mere Ho"	Ankur Tewari, Mikey McCleary	Ankur Tewari	Kunal Ganjawala	
Ajab Prem Ki Ghazab Kahani	"Main Tera Dhadkan Teri"	Pritam	Irshad Kamil	Hard Kaur, KK	
Ajab Prem Ki Ghazab Kahani	"Main Tera Dhadkan Teri" (Remix Version)	Pritam	Irshad Kamil	Hard Kaur, KK	
Ajab Prem Ki Ghazab Kahani	"Oh By God"	Pritam	Irshad Kamil	Mika Singh	
Aladin	"Bachke O Bachke"	Vishal–Shekhar	Anvita Dutt Guptan	Vishal Dadlani, Shankar Mahadevan, Shaan	
Baabarr	"Baje Raat Ke Barah"	Anand Raj Anand	Anand Raj Anand		
Bad Luck Govind	"Nam Myoho Renge Kyoh"	Anu Malik	Madan Pal		
Bad Luck Govind	"Nam Myoho Renge Kyoh" (Duet Version)	Anu Malik	Madan Pal	Anu Malik	
Billu Barber	"Marjaani"	Pritam	Gulzar	Sukhwinder Singh	
Billu Barber	"Marjaani" (Electro House Mix Version)	Pritam	Gulzar	Sukhwinder Singh	
Bolo Raam	"Tere Ishq Mein"	Sachin Gupta	Ajay Jhingran, Saajan Aggarwal		
Bolo Raam	"Tere Ishq Mein" (Remix Version)	Sachin Gupta	Ajay Jhingran, Saajan Aggarwal	Mahinder Singh	
Chal Chala Chal	"Aplam Chaplam"	Anu Malik	Vaibhav Modi	Joi Barua	
Chal Chalein	"Batla De Koyi"	Ilaiyaraaja	Piyush Mishra	Shaan, Aditya Narayan	
De Dana Dan	"Hotty Naughty"	Pritam	Neeraj Shridhar		
Dil Bole Hadippa!	"Bhangra Bistar"	Pritam	Jaideep Sahni	Alisha Chinai, Hard Kaur	
Dil Bole Hadippa!	"Discowale Khisko"	Pritam	Jaideep Sahni	Rana Mazumdar, KK	
Dil Bole Hadippa!	"Hadippa" (The Remix)	Pritam	Jaideep Sahni	Mika Singh	
Ek Se Bure Do	"Aisa Pehli Baar"	Ravi Pawar	Panchhi Jalonvi	Suzanne D'Mello	
Ek: The Power of One	"Sambhaale"	Pritam	Shabbir Ahmed	Sukhwinder Singh	
Fox	"Josh"	Monty Sharma	Sandeep Nath	Kunal Ganjawala	
Hum Phirr Milein Na Milein	"Main Ro Naa Padun"	Sandesh Shandilya	Irshad Kamil	Neeraj Shridhar	
Hum Phirr Milein Na Milein	"Sajan Mera Baar Baar"	Sandesh Shandilya	Irshad Kamil		
Kaun Ho Sakta Hai?	"Dil Mera Dole"	Bappi Lahiri	Bappi Lahiri		
Kaun Ho Sakta Hai?	"Sapna Dekha Tha"	Bappi Lahiri	Kuku Prabhash	Kunal Ganjawala	
Kaun Ho Sakta Hai?	"Apun To Ye Bolta Hai"	Bappi Lahiri	Kuku Prabhash	Kunal Ganjawala	
Kaun Ho Sakta Hai?	"Nacho Gao"	Bappi Lahiri	Kuku Prabhash	Kunal Ganjawala	
Kaun Ho Sakta Hai?	"Ye Haisa Nasha Hai"	Bappi Lahiri	Kuku Prabhash	Babul Supriyo	
Kambakkht Ishq	"Kambakkht Ishq"	Anu Malik	Anvita Dutt Guptan	KK	
Kambakkht Ishq	"Kambakkht Ishq" (Remix Version)	Anu Malik	Anvita Dutt Guptan	KK	
Kaminey	"Raat Ke Dhai Baje"	Vishal Bhardwaj	Gulzar	Suresh Wadkar, Rekha Bhardwaj, Kunal Ganjawala	
Kaminey	"Raat Ke Dhai Baje" (Remix Version)	Vishal Bhardwaj	Gulzar	Suresh Wadkar, Rekha Bhardwaj, Kunal Ganjawala	
Karma Aur Holi	"Aayi Aayi Holi"	Raju Singh	Sameer Pandey	Sonu Nigam, Jai Mohan	
Key Club	"Dil Kash Nazar"	Sagar Desai	Anjaan		
Key Club	"Meri Ulfat Ki Sabko Tishnagi"	Sagar Desai	Anjaan		
Kirkit	"Aap Jaisa Koi"	Shashi Pritam	Mast Ali		
Kirkit	"Kismat"	Shashi Pritam	Mast Ali		
Kisaan	"Punjabi Munde"	Daboo Malik	Kunwar Juneja	Labh Janjua, Shakti Singh, Daboo Malik, Parthiv Gohil, Earl Edgar D'Souza, Siddharth Singh	
Kisse Pyaar Karoon	"Aahoon Aahoon"	Daboo Malik	Shabbir Ahmed	Sonu Nigam	
Kisse Pyaar Karoon	"Aahoon Aahoon" (Remix Version)	Daboo Malik	Shabbir Ahmed	Sonu Nigam	
Let's Dance - Sirf Ek Bahana Chahiye	"Sansanati"	Vipin Mishra	Vipin Dhyani	Pervez Quadir	
Let's Dance - Sirf Ek Bahana Chahiye	"Taare Todh Ke La"	Vipin Mishra	Vipin Dhyani	Pervez Quadir	
Let's Dance - Sirf Ek Bahana Chahiye	"Let's Dance"	Vipin Mishra	Prateek Bhardwaj	Keerthi Sagathia	
Let's Dance - Sirf Ek Bahana Chahiye	"Let's Dance" (Remix Version)	Vipin Mishra	Prateek Bhardwaj	Keerthi Sagathia	
Life Partner	"Gunji Angna Mein Shehnai"	Pritam	Javed Akhtar	Keerthi Sagathia	
Life Partner	"Poorza Poorza"	Pritam	Kumaar	Kunal Ganjawala	
Life Partner	"Poorza Poorza" (Remix Version)	Pritam	Kumaar	Kunal Ganjawala	
Lottery	"Kab Chand Ban Kar"	Sanjay Pathak, Santosh Singh	Kumaar	Abhijeet Sawant	
Lottery	"Kab Chand Ban Kar" (Reprise Version)	Sanjay Pathak, Santosh Singh	Kumaar		
Love Aaj Kal	"Thoda Thoda Pyar"	Pritam	Irshad Kamil		
Love Aaj Kal	"Chor Bazaari"	Pritam	Irshad Kamil	Neeraj Shridhar	
Love Aaj Kal	"Chor Bazaari" (Remix Version)	Pritam	Irshad Kamil	Neeraj Shridhar	
Luck by Chance	"Yeh Aaj Kya Ho Gaya"	Shankar–Ehsaan–Loy	Javed Akhtar		
Main Aurr Mrs Khanna	"Happening"	Sajid-Wajid	Jalees Sherwani	Wajid Ali, Uvie, Farhad Wadia, Raja Mushtaq	
Main Aurr Mrs Khanna	"Happening" (Remix Version)	Sajid-Wajid	Jalees Sherwani	Wajid Ali, Uvie, Farhad Wadia, Raja Mushtaq	
Main Aurr Mrs Khanna	"Mrs. Khanna"	Sajid-Wajid	Jalees Sherwani	Bappi Lahiri, Shaan, Neuman Pinto, Suzanne D'Mello	
Marega Salaa	"Sehra Sehra"	Daboo Malik	Praveen Bharadwaj		
Marega Salaa	"Sehra Sehra" (Remix Version)	Daboo Malik	Praveen Bharadwaj		
Marega Salaa	"Tu Hi Hai" (Female Version)	Daboo Malik	Praveen Bharadwaj		
Marega Salaa	"Tu Hi Hai" (Remix Version)	Daboo Malik	Praveen Bharadwaj		
Mohandas	"Baras Ja"	Vivek Priyadarshan	V. K. Sonakia		
Mohandas	"Kaho Na Kaho Aise Batiya"	Vivek Priyadarshan	V. K. Sonakia		
New York	"Mere Sang"	Pritam	Sandeep Srivastava		
New York	"Mere Sang" (Remix Version)	Pritam	Sandeep Srivastava		
Paa	"Hichki Hichki"	Ilaiyaraaja	Swanand Kirkire		
Paying Guests	"Nazar Se Nazaria"	Sajid - Wajid	Jalees Sherwani		
Paying Guests	"Nazar Se Nazaria" (Remix Version)	Sajid - Wajid	Jalees Sherwani		
Phir Kabhi	"Dekho Ji Dekho"	Shantanu Moitra	Ajay Jhingran	Dibyendu Mukherjee	
Runway	"Pyaasi Machuriya"	Shamir Tandon	Shabbir Ahmed	Ravindra Upadhyay	
Runway	"Roshan Dil Ka Jahan"	Shamir Tandon	Shabbir Ahmed	Shaan	
Runway	"Roshan Dil Ka Jahan" (Dance Mix Version)	Shamir Tandon	Shabbir Ahmed	Raaj Gopal Iyer	
Ruslaan	"Har Ek Lamhe"	Raees Jamal Khan	A.M. Turaz	Javed Ali	
Ruslaan	"Har Ek Lamhe" (Club Mix Version)	Raees Jamal Khan	A.M. Turaz	Javed Ali	
Shaabash! You Can Do It	"Kiss Me One More Time"	Santokh Singh	Rahul B. Seth		
Shadow	"Khumariyan"	Anand Raj Anand	Anjan Sagri		
Shadow	"Masti Masti Masti"	Anand Raj Anand	Anjan Sagri		
Team - The Force	"Chika Chika Boom"	Daboo Malik	Shabbir Ahmed	Daboo Malik	
Team - The Force	"Satrangi"	Daboo Malik	Kunwar Juneja	Vinod Rathod	
The Stoneman Murders	"Qaatilana"	Siddharth - Suhas	Kumaar		
The Unforgettable	"Tanha"	Ismail Darbar	A. M. Turaz		
The Unforgettable	"Tanha" (Remix Version)	Ismail Darbar	A. M. Turaz		
Three – Love, Lies and Betrayal	"Kabhi Mujhe"	Chirantan Bhatt	S. Sagar		
Trump Card	"Dil Nakaam"	Lalit Sen, Sneha Khanwalkar	Sunil Jha		
Trump Card	"Raat Ka Jaadu"	Lalit Sen	Sunil Jha	Shaan	
Trump Card	"Life Is Fun Mastiya Hain"	Lalit Sen	Nawab Arzoo	Shaan	
Wanted	"Ishq Vishq"	Sajid-Wajid	Sameer	Kamaal Khan, Suzanne D'Mello	
Wanted	"Ishq Vishq" (Remix Version)	Sajid-Wajid	Sameer	Kamaal Khan, Suzanne D'Mello	
Wanted	"Tose Pyar Karte Hain"	Sajid-Wajid	Shabbir Ahmed	Wajid Ali	
Wanted	"Tose Pyar Karte Hain" (Remix Version)	Sajid-Wajid	Shabbir Ahmed	Wajid Ali	

=== 2010 ===
Film	Song	Composer(s)	Writer(s)	Co-singer(s)	Ref.
A Flat	"Chal Halke Halke"	Bappi Lahiri	Virag Mishra	Raja Hasan, Bappi Lahiri	
Action Replayy	"Chhan Ke Mohalla"	Pritam	Irshad Kamil	Ritu Pathak	
Action Replayy	"Chhan Ke Mohalla" (Remix Version)	Pritam	Irshad Kamil	Ritu Pathak	
Ada... A Way of Life	"Gulfisha"	A.R. Rahman	Nusrat Badr	Sonu Nigam, Viviane Chaix	
Allah Ke Banday	"Mayoos"	Hamza Faruqui	Sarim Momin		
Apartment	"O Jaane Jahaan"	Bappi Lahiri	Syed Gulrez	Shaan	
Apartment	"Candy Man"	Bappi Lahiri	Virag Mishra	Bid Lo	
Apartment	"Candy Man" (Remix Version)	Bappi Lahiri	Virag Mishra	Bid Lo	
Band Baaja Baaraat	"Ainvayi Ainvayi"	Salim–Sulaiman	Amitabh Bhattacharya	Salim Merchant	
Band Baaja Baaraat	"Ainvayi Ainvayi" (Dilli Club Mix Version)	Salim–Sulaiman	Amitabh Bhattacharya	Salim Merchant	
Break Ke Baad	"Dhoop Ke Makaan"	Vishal–Shekhar	Prasoon Joshi	Shekhar Ravjiani, Caralisa Monteiro, Hitesh Sonik	
Break Ke Baad	"Dhoop Ke Makaan Sa" (Acoustic Version)	Vishal–Shekhar	Prasoon Joshi	Shekhar Ravjiani, Hitesh Sonik	
Click	"Rubayee" (Duet Version)	Shamir Tandon	Shabbir Ahmed	Raaj Gopal Iyer	
Click	"Yaadein Yaad Aati Hain"	Shamir Tandon	Shabbir Ahmed	KK, Vijay Prakash	
Diwangi Ne Had Kar Di	"Be My Love"	Sandesh Shandilya	Akshar Allahabadi		
Do Dilon Ke Khel Mein	"Samajhdaar Ko Ishaara"	Daboo Malik	Panchhi Jalonvi	Daboo Malik, Sandeep Acharya, AD Boyz, Harshdeep Kaur	
Do Dooni Chaar	"Baaja Bajaye"	Meet Bros Anjjan Ankit	Manoj Muntashir		
Dus Tola	"Jee Na Jalaiyo" (Female Version)	Sandesh Shandilya	Gulzar		
Ek Second... Jo Zindagi Badal De?	"Fasale Bahara Hoon Main"	Saawan Kumar Tak	Pradeep Chaudhary		
Golmaal 3	"Desi Kali"	Pritam	Kumaar	Neeraj Shridhar	
Golmaal 3	"Desi Kali" (Remix Version)	Pritam	Kumaar	Neeraj Shridhar	
Gumshuda	"Tanha Rahein"	Bickram Ghosh	Rakesh Kumar Tripathi		
Guzaarish	"Udi"	Sanjay Leela Bhansali	A.M. Turaz	Shail Hada	
Hangover	"Made In India"	Bappi Lahiri	Priyo Chattopadhyay	Zubeen Garg	
Hello Darling	"Dil To Saala"	Pritam	Kumaar		
Hisss	"Lafanaa"	Anu Malik	Sayeed Quadri		
Hisss	"Lagi Lagi Milan Dhun"	Anu Malik	Sameer		
Housefull	"Aapka Kya Hoga (Dhanno)"	Shankar–Ehsaan–Loy	Sameer	Mika Singh, Shankar Mahadevan, Arun Ingle, Sajid Khan	
Housefull	"I Don't Know What To Do"	Shankar–Ehsaan–Loy	Sameer	Shabbir Kumar	
Housefull	"I Don't Know What To Do" (Remix Version)	Shankar–Ehsaan–Loy	Sameer	Shabbir Kumar	
Hum Tum Aur Ghost	"Banware Se Pooche Banwariya"	Shankar–Ehsaan–Loy	Javed Akhtar	Shaan	
I Hate Luv Storys	"Bin Tere"	Vishal - Shekhar	Vishal Dadlani	Shafqat Amanat Ali	
I Hate Luv Storys	"Bin Tere" (Remix Version)	Vishal - Shekhar	Vishal Dadlani	Shafqat Amanat Ali	
Idiot Box	"Fenny Aayi"	Anand–Milind	Sameer		
Jaane Kahan Se Aayi Hai	"Koi Rok Bhi Lo"	Sajid-Wajid	Sameer	Sonu Nigam	
Kajraare	"Kajraare"	Himesh Reshammiya	Sameer	Himesh Reshammiya	
Kajraare	"Kajraare" (Party Mix Version)	Himesh Reshammiya	Sameer	Himesh Reshammiya	
Kajraare	"Sanu Guzra Zamana"	Himesh Reshammiya	Sameer	Himesh Reshammiya	
Kajraare	"Sanu Guzra Zamana" (Lounge Mix Version)	Himesh Reshammiya	Sameer	Himesh Reshammiya	
Khallballi!	"Bhuri Bhuri"	Sajid-Wajid	Jalees Sherwani	Neeraj Shridhar	
Khallballi!	"Bhuri Bhuri" (Remix Version)	Sajid-Wajid	Jalees Sherwani	Neeraj Shridhar	
Khatta Meetha	"Sajde"	Pritam	Irshad Kamil	KK	
Kis Hudh Tak	"Dekh Mujhko Zara"	Abid Shah	Abid Shah		
Knock Out	"Jab Jab Dil Mile"	Gaurav Dasgupta	Panchhi Jalonvi		
Knock Out	"Jab Jab Dil Mile" (Remix Version)	Gaurav Dasgupta	Panchhi Jalonvi		
Kuchh Kariye	"Ishq Ki Chilam Bharle"	Onkar	Salim Bijnori	Sukhwinder Singh	
Mallika	"Chahoon Tujhe"	Pritam	Sudhakar Sharma	KK	
Mittal v/s Mittal	"Chal Chal"	Shamir Tandon	Shabbir Ahmed		
Mumbai 118	"Doobo Doobo"	Liyakat Ajmeri	Tauraz		
Musaa	"Main Ghaghra Chunri Pehne"	Santosh Sharma	Sahani Aslam	Joy Mukherjee	
Muskurake Dekh Zara	"Roothe Roothe"	Ranjit Barot	Mehboob Kotwal		
Na Ghar Ke Na Ghaat Ke	"Sajan Bawre"	Lalit Pandit	Mudassar Aziz		
Na Ghar Ke Na Ghaat Ke	"Sajan Bawre" (Remix Version)	Lalit Pandit	Mudassar Aziz		
No Problem	"Mast Punjabi"	Anand Raj Anand	Anand Raj Anand	Anand Raj Anand	
No Problem	"Mast Punjabi" (Remix Version)	Anand Raj Anand	Anand Raj Anand	Anand Raj Anand	
Once Upon a Time in Mumbaai	"Parda"	Pritam	Irshad Kamil	Rana Majumdar	
Pangaa Gang	"Panga Gang"	Shamir Tandon	Shamir Tandon	Raaj, Siddhant Bhosle	
Pankh	"Ji Jala"	Raju Singh	Sudipto Chatterjee		
Prem Kaa Game	"Duniya Se Jo Chaaha"	Raju Singh	Kiran Kotrial		
Prem Kaa Game	"I Wanna Fall In Love"	Raju Singh	Kiran Kotrial	Sonu Nigam	
Prem Kaa Game	"Zabardast"	Raju Singh	Kiran Kotrial	Sonu Nigam, Vishal Dadlani	
Sadiyaan	"Pehla Pehla Tajurba Hai"	Adnan Sami	Sameer	Kunal Ganjawala	
Sadiyaan	"Taron Bhari Hai Ye Raat"	Adnan Sami	Amjad Islam Amjad	Adnan Sami	
Shaapit	"Shaapit Hua"	Aditya Narayan	Aditya Narayan	Aditya Narayan	
Striker	"Pia Saanvara"	Shailendra Barve	Jeetendra Joshi		
Swaha	"Swaha"	Praveen Bharadwaj	Praveen Bharadwaj	Rikkee	
Swaha	"Swaha" (Remix Version)	Praveen Bharadwaj	Praveen Bharadwaj	Rikkee	
Teen Patti	"Neeyat Kharab Hai"	Salim-Sulaiman	Irfan Siddiqui		
Teen Patti	"Neeyat Kharab Hai" (Remix Version)	Salim-Sulaiman	Irfan Siddiqui, Ajinkya Iyer	Abhijit Vaghani	
Tees Maar Khan	"Sheila Ki Jawani"	Vishal–Shekhar	Vishal Dadlani	Vishal Dadlani	
Tees Maar Khan	"Sheila Ki Jawani" (Remix Version)	Vishal–Shekhar	Vishal Dadlani	Vishal Dadlani	
The Hangman	"Kajra"	Siddharth Suhas	Kumaar		
Tum Milo Toh Sahi	"I Am Bad"	Sandesh Shandilya	Irshad Kamil	Kunal Ganjawala	
Veer	"Surili Akhiyon Wale" (Duet Version)	Sajid-Wajid	Gulzar	Rahat Fateh Ali Khan, Suzanne D'Mello	
Yeh Sunday Kyun Aata Hai	"Rang Dharti Ke Liye" (Female Version)	Kumar Sanu	Sameer		
Yeh Sunday Kyun Aata Hai	"Saawan Na Bheegi"	Kumar Sanu	Sameer		

=== 2011 ===
Film	Song	Composer(s)	Writer(s)	Co-singer(s)	Ref.
Aashiqui.in	"Lichu Lichu"	Nitin Kumar Gupta, Prem Haria	Taufique Palvi	Amit Kumar, Neha Rajpal	
Aishwarya	"Jhoom Jhoom Jhoomle"	Vishnu Narayan	Atique Allahabadi	Arvinder Singh	
Always Kabhi Kabhi	"Better Not Mess With Me" (Rock Mix Version)	Pritam	Irfan Siddiqui		
Bas Ek Tamanna	"Zindagi Mojizah"	Onkar	Manthan		
Bbuddah... Hoga Terra Baap	"Main Chandigarh Di Star"	Vishal–Shekhar	Anvita Dutt Guptan		
Chargesheet	"Bollywood Bollywood"	Jaydip-Sanjay	Anant Joshi	Shreya Ghoshal	
Chargesheet	"Chargesheet" (Female Version)	Jaydip-Sanjay	Anant Joshi		
Chatur Singh Two Star	"Jungle Ki Heerni"	Sajid-Wajid	Jalees Sherwani		
Chatur Singh Two Star	"Jungle Ki Heerni" (Remix Version)	Sajid-Wajid	Jalees Sherwani		
College Campus	"Akhiyan Mila Mila Jara"	Atul	Sahil Sultanpuri		
Double Dhamaal	"Oye Oye"	Anand Raj Anand	Anand Raj Anand		
Double Dhamaal	"Oye Oye" (Remix Version)	Anand Raj Anand	Anand Raj Anand		
Dum Maaro Dum	"Te Amo" (Duet Version)	Pritam	Jaideep Sahni	Ash King	
Dum Maaro Dum	"Te Amo" (Remix Version)	Pritam	Jaideep Sahni	Ash King	
Dum Maaro Dum	"Te Amo" (Female Version)	Pritam	Jaideep Sahni		
Happy Husbands	"Ash Kar Ash Kar"	Anay Sharma	Sarim Momin		
Jo Hum Chahein	"One More One More"	Sachin Gupta	Kumaar	Neeraj Shridhar	
Kucch Luv Jaisaa	"Thoda Sa Pyaar"	Pritam	Irshad Kamil	Anupam Amod	
Lanka	"Haay Rama Rama"	Sharib-Toshi	Junaid Wasi		
Masti Express	"Jiya Pe Daaka Daal Doongi"	Chinar–Mahesh	Manoj Yadav		
Murder 2	"Aa Zara"	Sangeet Siddharth-Siddharth Haldipur	Kumaar		
Murder 2	"Aa Zara" (Reloaded Version)	Sangeet Siddharth-Siddharth Haldipur	Kumaar		
My Friend Pinto	"Tu"	Hitesh Sonik	Amitabh Bhattacharya		
Na Jaane Kabse	"Fulltun Ho Gayi Main Toh Yaar"	Jatin Pandit	Sameer		
Phhir	"Karma Queen"	Raghav Sachar	Aditya Dhar	Raghav Sachar	
Queens! Destiny of Dance	"Aankhon Me"	Anurag Ware	M. P. Anamika		
Rascals	"Pardaah Nasheen"	Vishal–Shekhar	Anvita Dutt Guptan	Neeraj Shridhar	
Rascals	"Shake It Saiyyan"	Vishal–Shekhar	Anvita Dutt Guptan	Haji Springer	
Rascals	"Shake It Saiyyan" (Hip-Hop Mix Version)	Vishal–Shekhar	Anvita Dutt Guptan	Haji Springer	
Stand By	"Din Dooba"	Aadesh Shrivastava	Shyam Raj		
Tanu Weds Manu	"Manu Bhaiya"	Krsna	Rajshekhar	Ujjaini Mukherjee, Niladri Debnath	
Tell Me O Kkhuda	"Mile Na Tu"	Giorgos Theofanous	Mayur Puri	Anupam Amod	
Tell Me O Kkhuda	"Someone Somebody"	Abhijeet Hegde Patil	Mayur Puri		
Tell Me O Kkhuda	"Tell Me O Kkhuda"	Sajid-Wajid	Jalees Sherwani		
The Dirty Picture	"Honeymoon Ki Raat"	Vishal–Shekhar	Rajat Arora		
The Dirty Picture	"Ishq Sufiyana" (Female Version)	Vishal–Shekhar	Rajat Arora		
United Six	"Booty Shake"	Pritam	Ashish Pandit	Style Bhai	
Who's There?	"Sili Sili Sargoshi Mein"	Dinu	—N/a		
Will To Live	"Jashan Ki Raat"	Bappi Lahiri	Sameer	Kumar Sanu	
Will To Live	"Jashan Ki Raat" (Remix Version)	Bappi Lahiri	Sameer	Kumar Sanu	
Will To Live	"U Will Survive"	Bappi Lahiri	Sameer	Sharon Prabhakar, Asha Bhosle	
Yeh Saali Zindagi	"Yeh Saali Zindagi" (Duet Version)	Nishat Khan	Swanand Kirkire	Kunal Ganjawala, Shilpa Rao	
Yeh Saali Zindagi	"Yeh Saali Zindagi" (Female Version)	Nishat Khan	Swanand Kirkire	Shilpa Rao	

=== 2012 ===
Film	Song	Composer(s)	Writer(s)	Co-singer(s)	Ref.
3 Bachelors	"Dag Mag Dag Mag"	Daboo Malik	Praveen Bharadwaj	Shaan	
Aiyyaa	"Sava Dollar"	Amit Trivedi	Amitabh Bhattacharya		
Agneepath	"Gun Gun Guna"	Ajay–Atul	Amitabh Bhattacharya	Udit Narayan	
Akkad Bakkad Bambe Bo	"Ya Habibi"	Harish Mangoli	Dweep Raj Kochhar	Udit Narayan	
Arjun: The Warrior Prince	"Kabhie Na Dekhe Hastinapur Mein"	Vishal–Shekhar	Piyush Mishra	Shreya Ghoshal, Shubha Mudgal, Ila Arun	
Barfi!	"Kyon"	Pritam Chakraborty	Neelesh Misra	Papon	
Bumboo	"Pinky" (Reprise Version)	Santokh Singh	Shadab Akhtar	Javed Ali	
Chaar Din Ki Chandni	"Chandni O Meri Chandni"	Shiv-Hari	Anand Bakshi	Parichay	
Chaar Din Ki Chandni	"Chaar Din Ki Chandni" (Club Mix Version)	Abhishek Ray	Sandeep Srivastava	Shaan	
Chakravyuh	"Kunda Khol"	Sandesh Shandilya	Ashish Sahu		
Chakravyuh	"Paro"	Aadesh Shrivastava	Panchhi Jalonvi	Shaan, Aadesh Shrivastava	
Chal Pichchur Banate Hain	"Baanwra Mann"	Gaurav Dagaonkar	Seema Saini	Shaan	
Chhodo Kal Ki Baatein	"Rum Mein Gum"	Saleel Kulkarni	Sandeep Khare		
Chhodo Kal Ki Baatein	"Rum Mein Gum" (Remix Version)	Saleel Kulkarni	Sandeep Khare		
Cocktail	"Yaariyan" (Reprise Version)	Pritam Chakraborty	Irshad Kamil	Arijit Singh	
Dekha Jo Pehli Baar	"Dum Maaro Dum"	Mickey Narula	Yudhveer Singh	Mickey Narula	
Dhama Chaukdi	"Nigahon Se Tumko"	Sahil Rayyan	Arafat Mahmood		
English Vinglish	"Navrai Majhi"	Amit Trivedi	Swanand Kirkire	Swanand Kirkire, Natalie Di Luccio, Neelambari Kirkire	
Future To Bright Hai Ji	"Tum Mere Saath Ho"	Mohinderjit Singh	Pramod Kush	Shaan	
Ghost	"Aaja Khatam Sabr"	Sharib-Toshi	A.M. Turaz		
Hate Story	"Raat"	Harshit Saxena	Kumaar		
Hate Story	"Raat" (Remix Version)	Harshit Saxena	Kumaar		
Heroine	"Halkat Jawani"	Salim–Sulaiman	Niranjan Iyengar		
Housefull 2	"Right Now Now"	Sajid-Wajid	Sameer	Wajid Ali, Suzanne D'Mello	
I M 24	"Tan Mein Jalan Kuch"	Jatin Pandit	Saurabh Shukla		
Ishaqzaade	"Chokra Jawaan"	Amit Trivedi	Habib Faisal	Vishal Dadlani	
It's Rocking Dard-E-Disco	"Disco King"	Bappi Lahiri	Virag Mishra	Bappi Lahiri	
Joker	"Kafirana"	Gaurav Dagaonkar	Shirish Kunder	Adarsh Shinde	
Krishna Aur Kans	"Putana (Baccho Jara Dur Dur Rahena Re)"	Shantanu Moitra	Swanand Kirkire		
London, Paris, New York	"London, Paris, New York"	Ali Zafar	Ali Zafar	Ali Zafar	
Mere Dost Picture Abhi Baki Hai	"It's Rain Rain"	Sukhwinder Singh	Sameer	Sukhwinder Singh	
Mere Dost Picture Abhi Baki Hai	"Salaam E Ishq Tu"	Subhash Pradhan	Swasti Shree Sharma		
Prem Mayee	"Paheli"	Abhishek Ray	Shekhar S. Jha		
Sadda Adda	"Dilli Ki Billi"	Shamir Tandon	Shamir Tandon, Sandeep Nath	Neeraj Shridhar	
Sadda Adda	"Dilli Ki Billi" (Remix Version)	Shamir Tandon	Shamir Tandon, Sandeep Nath	Neeraj Shridhar	
Say Yes to Love	"Aaj Ye Bewajah"	Jatin Pandit	Jalees Sherwani		
Say Yes to Love	"Dhoondoon Mehfilon Mein Woh Jawaan"	Jatin Pandit	Jalees Sherwani		
Sons of Ram	"Door Kaheen"	Gaurav Issar	Asif Ali Beg		
Sons of Ram	"Door Kaheen" (Reprise Version 1)	Gaurav Issar	Asif Ali Beg		
Sons of Ram	"Door Kaheen" (Reprise Version 2)	Gaurav Issar	Asif Ali Beg		
Sons of Ram	"Mera Jodidaar"	Gaurav Issar	Asif Ali Beg		
Student of the Year	"The Disco Song"	Vishal–Shekhar	Anvita Dutt Guptan	Nazia Hassan, Benny Dayal	
Tere Naal Love Ho Gaya	"Fann Ban Gayi"	Sachin–Jigar	Priya Panchal, Mayur Puri	Kailash Kher	
Tere Naal Love Ho Gaya	"Fann Ban Gayi" (Remix Version)	Sachin–Jigar	Priya Panchal, Mayur Puri	Kailash Kher	
Teri Meri Kahaani	"Jabse Mere Dil Ko Uff"	Sajid-Wajid	Prasoon Joshi	Sonu Nigam	
Tezz	"Laila"	Sajid-Wajid	Shabbir Ahmed		
Tezz	"Laila" (Remix Version)	Sajid-Wajid	Shabbir Ahmed		
Tezz	"Tezz" (Female Version)	Sajid-Wajid	Jalees Sherwani		
Tezz	"Tezz" (Female Remix Version)	Sajid-Wajid	Jalees Sherwani		
Vicky Donor	"Mar Jayian" (Romantic Version)	Donn-Bann	Swanand Kirkire	Vishal Dadlani	
Zindagi Tere Naam	"Ajnabee Sa Lagta Hai"	Sajid-Wajid	Jalees Sherwani, Faaiz Anwar Quereshi	Sajid Khan	
Zindagi Tere Naam	"Tauba Tauba"	Sajid-Wajid	Jalees Sherwani, Faaiz Anwar Quereshi	Wajid Ali	
Zindagi Tere Naam	"Trishna Trishna Dil"	Sajid-Wajid	Jalees Sherwani, Faaiz Anwar Quereshi	Shafqat Amanat Ali	
Zindagi Tere Naam	"Milne Ko Nahi Aaye" (Duet Version)	Sajid-Wajid	Jalees Sherwani, Faaiz Anwar Quereshi	Shaan	
Zindagi Tere Naam	"Milne Ko Nahi Aaye" (Female Version)	Sajid-Wajid	Jalees Sherwani, Faaiz Anwar Quereshi		

=== 2013 ===
Film	Song	Composer(s)	Writer(s)	Co-singer(s)	Ref.
Akaash Vani	"Crazy Lover"	Hitesh Sonik	Luv Ranjan	Vishal Dadlani	
Akaash Vani	"Pad Gaye Ji"	Hitesh Sonik	Luv Ranjan	KK	
Ankur Arora Murder Case	"Tera Aks Hain"	Sunny Bawra, Inder Bawra	Sagar Lahauri		
Besharam	"Chal Hand Uthake Nachche"	Lalit Pandit	Kumaar	Daler Mehndi, Mika Singh	
Bloody Isshq	"Danger Hai Laila"	Ashok Bhadra	Kumaar		
Bloody Isshq	"Janam"	Ashok Bhadra	Kumaar		
Bombay Talkies	"Apna Bombay Talkies"	Amit Trivedi	Swanand Kirkire	Udit Narayan, Alka Yagnik, Kumar Sanu, Abhijeet Bhattacharya, S. P. Balasubrahmanyam, Kavita Krishnamurthy, Sudesh Bhonsle, Shreya Ghoshal, Shaan, KK, Sukhwinder Singh, Shilpa Rao, Mohit Chauhan, Sonu Nigam	
Boyss Toh Boyss Hain	"Dreaming"	Gourav Dasgupta	Panchhi Jalonvi	Anup Jalota	
Chennai Express	"Kashmir Main Tu Kanyakumari"	Vishal–Shekhar	Amitabh Bhattacharya	Arijit Singh, Neeti Mohan	
Commando	"Mungda"	Mannan Shaah	Mayur Puri		
Deewana Main Deewana	"Kala Doriya"	Bappi Lahiri	Maya Govind	Sudesh Bhosle, Ila Arun	
Dhoom 3	"Kamli"	Pritam Chakraborty	Amitabh Bhattacharya		
Ek Thi Daayan	"Yaaram"	Vishal Bhardwaj	Gulzar	Clinton Cerejo	
Four Two Ka One	"Give Me A Call"	J.D. Singh - Rajan	Kumaar		
Himmatwala	"Dhoka Dhoka"	Sajid-Wajid	Sameer	Bappi Lahiri, Mamta Sharma	
Himmatwala	"Thank God It's Friday"	Sachin–Jigar	Sameer		
Ishkq in Paris	"It's All About Tonight"	Sajid-Wajid	Priya Panchal	Sophie Choudry, Rahul Vaidya	
Ishkq in Paris	"Jaane Bhi De" (Duet Version)	Sajid-Wajid	Kausar Munir	Sonu Nigam	
Jackpot	"Jackpot Jeetna"	Sridevi Keshavan, Janaka Atugoda	Kaizad Gustad, Sridevi Keshavan, Irfan Siddiqui		
Kaash Tum Hote	"Reshma Ki Jawani"	Vinay Tiwari, Nikhil Kamat	Shabbir Ahmed		
Kyun Hua Achanak	"Mukhtasar Si Zindagi"	Rajendra Shiv	Ravi Chopra		
Luv U Soniyo	"You're My Valentine"	Vipin Patwa	DR Sagar	Sonu Nigam, Joy	
Once Upon Ay Time in Mumbai Dobaara!	"Tu Hi Khwahish"	Pritam Chakraborty	Rajat Arora		
Phata Poster Nikhla Hero	"Janam Janam" (Reprise Version)	Pritam Chakraborty	Irshad Kamil		
R... Rajkumar	"Mat Maari"	Pritam Chakraborty	Anupam Amod	Kunal Ganjawala	
Race 2	"Be Intehaan"	Pritam Chakraborty	Mayur Puri	Atif Aslam	
Race 2	"Be Intehaan" (Remix Version)	Pritam Chakraborty	Mayur Puri	Atif Aslam	
Raqt	"Mujhe Mili"	Daboo Malik	Panchhi Jalonvi		
Shootout at Wadala	"Aala Re Aala"	Anu Malik	Neelesh Misra	Mika Singh	
Shootout at Wadala	"Aala Re Aala" (Remix Version)	Anu Malik	Neelesh Misra	Mika Singh	
Shootout at Wadala	"Ek Din Ke Liye"	Anu Malik	Neelesh Misra		
Shootout at Wadala	"Babli Badmaash"	Anu Malik	Kumaar		
Shootout at Wadala	"Babli Badmaash" (Remix Version)	Anu Malik	Kumaar		
Shuddh Desi Romance	"Tere Mere Beech Mein"	Sachin–Jigar	Jaideep Sahni	Mohit Chauhan	
Singh Saab The Great	"Palang Todh"	Anand Raj Anand	Sameer	Anand Raj Anand	
Special 26	"Kaun Mera" (Female Version)	M.M. Kreem	Irshad Kamil		
Tara	"Chipkali"	Prakash Prabhakar	Tanveer Ghazi, Ashish		
Wake Up India	"Bairi Tataiya"	Shankar Sahney	Raju Rajasthani	Shankar Sahney	
Wake Up India	"Bairi Tataiya"	Shankar Sahney	Raju Rajasthani	Shankar Sahney	
Yamla Pagla Deewana 2	"Suit Tera Lal Rang Da"	Sharib–Toshi	Kumaar	Sonu Nigam	
Yamla Pagla Deewana 2	"YPD2 – Mash Up"	Sharib–Toshi	Kumaar	Mika Singh, Shankar Mahadevan, Sonu Nigam, Sukhwinder Singh, Shreya Ghoshal	
Yeh Jawaani Hai Deewani	"Dilliwaali Girlfriend"	Pritam Chakraborty	Kumaar	Arijit Singh	
Zila Ghaziabad	"Chhamiya No. 1"	Amjad–Nadeem	Bappi Lahiri	Shabab Sabri	

=== 2014 ===
Film	Song	Composer(s)	Writer(s)	Co-singer(s)	Ref.
Hasee Toh Phasee	"Punjabi Wedding Song"	Vishal–Shekhar	Amitabh Bhattacharya	Benny Dayal	
Highway	"Tu Kuja"	A.R. Rahman	Irshad Kamil		
Lucky Kabootar	"DJ Te Gulabo Nachdi"	Santokh Singh	Sameer	Santokh Singh, Big Sinn	
Lucky Kabootar	"Mein Nahi Rahna Tere Naal"	Santokh Singh	Sameer	Shaan, Uvie	
Kahin Hai Mera Pyar	"Dilwale Dilwale"	Ravindra Jain	Ravindra Jain		
Hawaa Hawaai	"Ghoom Gayi"	Hitesh Sonik	Amole Gupte		
Bazaar E Husn	"Maare Nainva Ke Baan"	Khayyam	Maya Govind		
Mardaani	"Mardaani Anthem"	Salim–Sulaiman	Kausar Munir	Vijay Prakash	
Mumbhai Connection	"Bella Notte Dance With Me"	Praveen Datt Stephen	—N/a		
Mary Kom	"Adhure"	Shashi Suman	Prashant Ingole		
Daawat-e-Ishq	"Daawat-E-Ishq"	Sajid–Wajid	Kausar Munir	Javed Ali	
Khoobsurat	"Engine Ki Seeti"	Sneha Khanwalkar	Ikram Rajasthani	Resmi Sateesh	
Khoobsurat	"Baal Khade"	Sneha Khanwalkar	Sunil Choudhary		
Happy New Year	"Dance Like a Chammiya"	Vishal–Shekhar	Vishal Dadlani	Vishal Dadlani	
Rang Rasiya	"Rang Rasiya"	Sandesh Shandilya	Manoj Muntashir	Keerthi Sagathia	
Rang Rasiya	"Rang Rasiya" (Remix Version)	Sandesh Shandilya	Manoj Muntashir	Keerthi Sagathia	
Rang Rasiya	"Kahe Sataye"	Sandesh Shandilya	Manoj Muntashir	Roop Kumar Rathod	
Kill Dil	"Bol Beliya"	Shankar–Ehsaan–Loy	Gulzar	Shankar Mahadevan, Siddharth Mahadevan	
Hum Hai Teen Khurafaati	"Mohalle Mein Hookah"	Kashi-Richard	Deepak Noor	Amitabh Narayan	
Zid	"Tu Zaroori"	Sharib–Toshi	Shakeel Azmi	Sharib Sabri	
Zid	"Zid"	Sharib–Toshi	Shakeel Azmi		

=== 2015 ===
Film	Song	Composer(s)	Writer(s)	Co-singer(s)	Ref
Mumbai Can Dance Saala	"Mumbai Can Dance Saala"	Bappi Lahiri	Gulzar	Bappi Lahiri	
Dolly Ki Doli	"Phatte Tak Nachna"	Sajid–Wajid	Danish Sabri		
I (Dubbed version)	"Tum Todo Na" (Male Version)	A. R. Rahman	Irshad Kamil	Ash King	
Hey Bro	"DJ"	Nitz 'N' Sony	Pranav Vatsa	Ali Zafar	
Dilliwali Zaalim Girlfriend	"Janib"	Jatinder Shah	Kumaar	Arijit Singh	
Dilliwali Zaalim Girlfriend	"Janib" (Female Version)	Jatinder Shah	Kumaar		
Doctor, I Love You	"Doctor I Love You"	Subhash Pradhan	Manoj Yadav		
Luckhnowi Ishq	"Pyari Banno"	Raaj Aashoo	Sudhakar Sharma		
Piku	"Piku"	Anupam Roy	Anupam Roy		
Piku	"Piku" (Remix By DJ AKS)	Anupam Roy	Anupam Roy		
Dil Dhadakne Do	"Girls Like To Swing"	Shankar–Ehsaan–Loy			
Frozen (Hindi Dubbed)	"Fanaa Ho"	Kristen Anderson-Lopez	Pinky Poonawala		
I Love Desi	"Holi (Color Zindagi Hai)"	Sham Balkar	Sham Balkar	Mika Singh	
Second Hand Husband	"Channa"	Jatinder Shah	Kumaar		
Second Hand Husband	"Jawaani Din Char"	Jatinder Shah	Rahul Behenwal	Labh Janjua	
Chehere	"Kabhi Khud Se Kam"	Jaideep Chowdhury	Sayeed Quadri	Shilpa Rao, Mahalakshmi Iyer	
Wedding Pullav	"Naseeba"	Salim–Sulaiman	Irfan Siddiqui		
Tanu Weds Manu: Returns	"Move On"	Krsna Solo	Rajshekhar		

=== 2016 ===
Film	Song	Composer(s)	Writer(s)	Co-singer(s)	Ref
Saala Khadoos	"Jhalli Pathaka"	Santhosh Narayanan	Swanand Kirkire		
Fitoor	"Tere Liye"	Amit Trivedi	Swanand Kirkire	Jubin Nautiyal	
Fitoor	"Ranga Re"	Amit Trivedi	Swanand Kirkire	Amit Trivedi	
Final Cut of Director	"Zindagi"	Himesh Reshammiya	Sameer		
Neerja	"Aisa Kyun Maa"	Vishal Khurana	Prasoon Joshi		
Rhythm	"Yaro"	Salman Ahmad	Sameer, Salman Ahmad	Salman Ahmad	
Rhythm	"Do You Wanna Dance With Me"	Salman Ahmad	Sameer, Salman Ahmad	Suresh Peters	
Rocky Handsome	"Titliyan"	Santhosh Narayanan	Sagar Lahauri		
Love Games	"Aye Dil"	Sangeet-Siddharth	Kausar Munir		
Club Dancer	"Pee Daala Maine"	Varinder Vizz	Paramjeet Singh Saajan	Varinder Vizz	
Club Dancer	"Mama Miya"	Sunjoy Basu	Diksha Jyoti		
Sarabjit	"Tung Lak"	Shail- Pritesh			
Akira	"Baadal"	Vishal–Shekhar	Manoj Muntashir		
Shivaay	"Darkhaast"	Mithoon	Sayeed Quadri	Arijit Singh	
Fuddu	"Tum Tum Tum Ho"	Rana Mazumder	Panchhi	Arijit Singh	
Gandhigiri	"Yaara Ve"			Ankit Tiwari	
Dear Zindagi	"Just Go To Hell Dil"	Amit Trivedi	Kausar Munir		
Kahaani 2: Durga Rani Singh	"Lamhon Ke Rasgulle"	Clinton Cerejo	Amitabh Bhattacharya	Bianca Gomes	
Befikre	"Je t'aime"	Vishal–Shekhar	Jaideep Sahni	Vishal Dadlani	
Ashley	"Behki Hui Si Raat"	Dushyant Dubey	Dushyant Dubey		
Fredrick					

=== 2017 ===
Film	Song	Composer(s)	Writer(s)	Co-singer(s)	Ref
Rangoon	"Bloody Hell"	Vishal Bhardwaj	Gulzar		
Rangoon	"Tippa"	Vishal Bhardwaj	Gulzar	Sukhwinder Singh, Rekha Bhardwaj, O.S. Arun	
Naam Shabana	"Zinda"	Rochak Kohli	Manoj Muntashir		
The Wishing Tree	"Kai Sadiyon Pehli"	Sandesh Shandilya	Anil Pandey		
Munna Michael	"Pyar Ho"	Vishal Mishra	Kumaar	Vishal Mishra	
Munna Michael	"Pyar Ho (Redux)"	Vishal Mishra	Kumaar		
Jab Harry Met Sejal	"Radha"	Pritam	Irshad Kamil	Shahid Mallya	
Jab Harry Met Sejal	"Butterfly"	Pritam	Irshad Kamil	Aman Trikha, Nooran Sisters, Dev Negi	
Toilet: Ek Prem Katha	"Bakheda"	Vickey Prasad	Garima Wahal & Siddharth Singh	Sukhwinder Singh	
Haseena Parkar	"Piya Aa"	Sachin–Jigar	Vayu		
Simran	"Pinjra Tod Ke"	Sachin–Jigar	Priya Saraiya		
Secret Superstar	"Gudgudi"	Amit Trivedi	Kausar Munir		
Firangi	"Oye Firangi"	Jatinder Shah	Dr. Devendra Kafir		
Blue Mountains	"Shanno"				
Prakash Electronic	"Habibi"				

=== 2018 ===
Film	Song	Composer(s)	Writer(s)	Co-singer(s)	Ref
Aiyaary	"Lae Dooba"	Rochak Kohli	Manoj Muntashir		
Veerey Ki Wedding	"Hatt Ja Tau"	Jaidev Kumar	Dr. Devendra Kafir, Ramkesh Jiwanpurwala, Chandan Bakshi		
October	"Manwaa"	Shantanu Moitra	Swanand Kirkire		
Tishnagi	"Tishnagi"	Gufy	Manzer Baliyavi	Dev Negi	
Ishq Tera	"I'm Broken"	Swapnil H Digde	Dinkar Shirke, Amogh Balaji	Amogh Balaji	
Ishq Tera	"I'm Broken Club Mix (Trance)"	Swapnil H Digde	Dinkar Shirke, Amogh Balaji	Amogh Balaji	
Raazi	"Ae Watan"	Shankar–Ehsaan–Loy	Gulzar		
Veere Di Wedding	"Pappi Le Loon"	Shashwat Sachdev	Shellee	Shashwat Sachdev	
Sanju	"Main Badhiya Tu Bhi Badhiya"	Rohan-Rohan	Puneet Sharma	Sonu Nigam	
Teri Bhabhi Hai Pagle	"Tattoo Song"	Anamik Chauhan	Hari Shankar Sufi		
Soorma	"Good Man Di Laaltain"	Shankar–Ehsaan–Loy	Gulzar	Sukhwinder Singh	
Fanney Khan	"Mohabbat"	Tanishk Bagchi	Irshad Kamil		
Fanney Khan	"Halka Halka Suroor"	Amit Trivedi	Irshad Kamil	Divya Kumar	
Saheb, Biwi Aur Gangster 3	"Aye Huzoor"	Rana Mazumder	Kausar Kausar Munirka	Shaan	
Mulk	"Thenge Se"	Prasad Sashte		Swanand Kirkire, Suvarna Tiwari	
Laila Majnu	"Lala Zula Zalio"	Joi Barua	Irshad Kamil	Joi Barua, Frankie (Kashmiri)	
Pataakha	"Balma"	Vishal Bhardwaj	Gulzar	Rekha Bhardwaj	
Lupt	"Bhoot Hoon Main"	Vicky-Hardik	Hardik Acharya		
Helicopter Eela	"Dooba Dooba"	Amit Trivedi	Swanand Kirkire	Arijit Singh	
Thugs of Hindostan	"Manzoor-e-Khuda"	Ajay–Atul	Amitabh Bhattacharya	Shreya Ghoshal, Sukhwinder Singh	

=== 2019 ===
Film	Song	Composer(s)	Writer(s)	Co-singer(s)	Ref
Amavas	"Bheege Bheege"	Ankit Tiwari	Anurag Bhomia	Ankit Tiwari	
Cabaret	"Paani Paani"	Kaustav Narayan Niyogi	Kaustav Narayan Niyogi		
Chhota Bheem: Kung Fu Dhamaka	"Circus Jam"	John Steward Eduri	Darshana Radhak		
Chhota Bheem: Kung Fu Dhamaka	"Mahal Mein Sabka Swagat Hai"	Sunil Kaushik	Sudhak Sharma		
De De Pyaar De	"Vaddi Sharaban"	Vipin Patwa	Kumaar	Navraj Hans	
De De Pyaar De	"Vaddi Sharaban" (Talli Mix)	Vipin Patwa	Kumaar	Navraj Hans	
Hotel Mumbai	"Bharat Salaam"	Mithoon	Mithoon	B Praak	
Jhalki	"Khajan Chidiya"	Sandesh Shandilya	Brahmanand S. Siingh	Sandesh Shandilya	
Kadke Kamaal Ke	"Kis Kis Ke Doon"	Tash M, Young J	Laxman Singh	Young J	
Marne Bhi Do Yaaron	"Chuppi"	Rajendra Shivv	Mithun Raikwar		
One Day: Justice Delivered	"Khuda Ka Noor"	Vikrant - Prarijat	Smita Kabra, Vinu Sagwan	Vikrant	
Saand Ki Aankh	"Udta Teetar"	Vishal Mishra	Raj Shekhar	Jyoti Nooran	
Sye Raa Narasimha Reddy	"Sye Raa"	Amit Trivedi	Swanand Kirkire	Shreya Ghoshal	
The Lion King (Dubbed)	Pyaar Ki Ye Shaam Hai			Armaan Malik	
Frozen 2 (Dubbed in Hindi)	Anjaan Jahaan	Kristen-Anderson Lopez	Kausar Munir		
Frozen 2 (Dubbed in Hindi)	Tu Kon Hai ??	Kristen-Anderson Lopez	Kausar Munir	Smita Malhotra	
Frozen 2 (Dubbed in Hindi)	Kuchh Hai Jo Badle Naa	Kristen-Anderson Lopez	Kausar Munir	Sharvi Yadav, Sangeet Haldipur, Kshitij Tare &Cast of Frozen II	

=== 2020 ===
Film	Song	Composer(s)	Writer(s)	Co-singer(s)	Ref
Sab Kushal Mangal	"Nayi Wali Jab"	Harshit Saxena	Sameer Anjaan		
Dil Bechara	"Maskari"	A. R. Rahman	Amitabh Bhattacharya	Hriday Gattani	
Shakuntala Devi	"Pass Nahi Toh Fail Nahi"	Sachin–Jigar	Vayu		
Shakuntala Devi	"Rani Hindustani"	Sachin–Jigar	Vayu		

=== 2021 ===
Film	Song	Composer(s)	Writer(s)	Co-singer(s)	Ref
The Big Bull	"Paise Ka Nasha"	Mehul Vyas	Anil Verma		
Bhoot Police	"Aayi Aayi Bhoot Police"	Sachin–Jigar	Kumaar	Vishal Dadlani, Mellow D	
Oye Mamu!	"Baandh Liya"	Sandesh Shandilya	Swanand Kirkire	Kunal Ganjawala	
Badnaam	"Phir Se"	Sonal Pradhan	Shakeel Azmi		
Spin	"Pakki Yaariyaan"	Salim–Sulaiman	Shraddha Pandit	Sukhwinder Singh	
Bunty Aur Babli 2	"Dhik Chik"	Shankar–Ehsaan–Loy	Amitabh Bhattacharya	Mika Singh	
Antim: The Final Truth	"Chingari"	Hitesh Modak	Vaibhav Joshi		
Pushpa: The Rise (D)	"Saami Saami"	Devi Sri Prasad	Raqueeb Alam		

=== 2022 ===
Film	Song	Composer(s)	Writer(s)	Co-singer(s)	Ref
The Fame Game	"Dupatta Mera"	Salim-Sulaiman	Shraddha Pandit		
Dhaakad	"So Ja re"	Dhruv Ghanekar	Ishitta Arun	Hariharan	
Dhaakad	"Barood"	Shankar Ehsaan Loy	Amitabh Bhattacharya		
Samrat Prithviraj	"Yoddha"	Shankar Ehsaan Loy	Varun Grover		
Vikrant Rona	"Ra Ra Rakamma"	B. Ajaneesh Loknath	Anup Bhandari	Nakash Aziz	
Anek	"The Voice of Anek"	Anurag Saikia	Shakeel Azmi	Vivek Hariharan Anurag Saikia	
Ladki	"Tu Nahi"	DSR	Nitin Raikwar		
Ladki	"Hatt Saala"	Ravi Shankar	Nitin Raikwar		
Judaa Hoke Bhi	"Andekhi"	Puneet Dixit	Shweta Bothra		
Miami Seh New York	"Aisa Sama"	Viju Shah	Syed Gulrez		
Miami Seh New York	"Yeh Zindagi Female"	Viju Shah	Syed Gulrez		
Plan A Plan B	"Talli"	Bann Chakraborty	Ginny Diwan		
Mareech	" Jaa ne Jaa "	Amaal Mallik	Rashmi Virag		

=== 2023 ===
Film	Song	Composer(s)	Writer(s)	Co-singer(s)	Ref
Kuttey	"Khoon Ki Khushboo"	Vishal Bhardwaj	Gulzar		
Chhatriwali	"Chhatriwali" (Title Track)	Rohan-Rohan	Tejas Prabha, Vijay Deoskar		
Chhatriwali	"Special Edition Kudi"	Sumeet Ballery	Satya Khare	Ganddharv Sachdeva	
Tu Jhoothi Main Makkaar	"Show Me The Thumka"	Pritam	Amitabh Bhattacharya	Shashwat Singh	
Happi	"Mera Toh Chand Hai"	Ilaiyaraaja	Mohinder Pratap Singh		
Happi	"Raat Yeh Ghul Gayi	Ilaiyaraaja	Rishhabh Sharrma		
Zwigato	"Yeh Raat"	Hitesh Sonik	Devanshu and Geet		
The Kerala Story	"Pagal Parindey"	Bishakh Jyoti	Ozil Dalal	Bishakh Jyoti	
Chatrapathi	"Bareilly Ki Bazaar"	Tanishk Bagchi	Mayur Puri	Dev Negi	
Das Ka Dhamki	"Pocket Mein Paisa"	Leon James	Amitabh Verma	Deepak Blue	
Jubilee (Web Series)	"Babuji Bhole"	Amit Trivedi	Kausar Munir		
Jubilee (Web Series)	"Nahin Ji Nahin"	Amit Trivedi	Kausar Munir		
Jubilee (Web Series)	"Vo Tere Mere"	Amit Trivedi	Kausar Munir		
Jubilee (Web Series)	"Itni Si Hi Dastaan"	Amit Trivedi	Kausar Munir		
Mumbaikar	"Dil Gaya"	Ramdas VS	Shweta Raj		
Akelli	"Umeedon Ki Titliyan"	Hitesh Sonik	Raj Shekhar		
Dream Girl 2	"Mai Marjawangi"	Meet Bros	Rashmi Virag	Danish Sabri	
Khufiya	"Dil Dushman" (Female)	Vishal Bhardwaj	Gulzar		
Khufiya	"Tanhai"	Vishal Bhardwaj	Gulzar		
Thank You for Coming	"Pari Hoon Main"	The Jamroom	Raajesh Johri	Sushant Divgikr	
Farrey	"Machade Tabahi"	Sachin-Jigar	Abhishek Dubey		

=== 2024 ===
Film	Song	Composer(s)	Writer(s)	Co-singer(s)	Ref
Love Sex Aur Dhokha 2	"Gaandi Taal"	Sneha Khanwalkar	Dibakar Banerjee, Vayu	Sneha Khanwalkar	
Savi	"Pinjra"	Arkadeep Karmakar	Ritajaya Banerjee		
Vicky Vidya Ka Woh Wala Video	"Sajna Ve Sajna"	White Noise Collectives	Irshad Kamil	Divya Kumar	
Auron Mein Kahan Dum Tha	"Jahan Se Chale The"	M. M. Kreem	Manoj Muntashir	Jubin Nautiyal	
Auron Mein Kahan Dum Tha	"Dobara Humein Kya"	M. M. Kreem	Manoj Muntashir	Jubin Nautiyal	
Kahan Shuru Kahan Khatam	"Babu Ki Baby"	Sunny M. R.	Ashish Pandit		
Dukaan	"Rang Maar De Holi Hai"	Shreyas Puranik	Siddharth–Garima	Vishal Dadlani, Bhoomi Trivedi, Osmaan Mir	
Naam	"Dum Dum Maaro"	Sajid–Wajid	Jalees Sherwani	Wajid Khan	
Naam	"Laila"	Himesh Reshammiya	Sameer Anjaan	Kunal Ganjawala	
Naam	"Ishq Da"	Himesh Reshammiya	Sameer Anjaan		

=== 2025 ===
Film	Song	Composer(s)	Writer(s)	Co-singer(s)	Ref
The Bhootnii	"Rang Laga (Ethereal)"	Vaishnavi Thakur, Akshay the One	Mukund Suryawanshi		
Be Happy	"Sultana"	Harsh Upadhyay	Sukriti Bhardwaj, Pranav Vatsa, Harsh Upadhyay	Nora Fatehi, Mika Singh	
Kesari Veer	"Dholida Dhol Nagada"	Monty Sharma	Shrujan	Kirtidaan Gadhvi, Gaurav Chhatti	
Hai Junoon!	"Ek Main Aur Ek Tu"	Vishal-Shekhar	Sameeruddin, Vishal-Shekhar		
Pune Highway	"Aali Ga"	Clinton Cerejo, Bianca Gomes	Sudeep Naik		
Housefull 5	"Housefull 5 Mixtape"	Shankar–Ehsaan–Loy, Sajid–Wajid, Julius Packiam	Amitabh Bhattacharya, Sameer Anjaan	Ritu Pathak, Neeraj Shridhar, Alyssa Mendonsa, Tarun Sagar, Loy Mendonsa, Wajid Khan, Suzanne D'Mello	
Bhool Chuk Maaf	"Chor Bazari Phir Se"	Tanishk Bagchi	Irshad Kamil	Neeraj Shridhar, Zahrah S. Khan, Pravesh Mallick	
Ufff Yeh Siyapaa	"Tamancha"	A.R. Rahman	Amitabh Bhattacharya		
Ek Deewane Ki Deewaniyat	"Dil Dil Dil"	Rajat Nagpal	Siddhant Kaushal	Divya Kumar	
Badass Ravi Kumar	"Hookstep Hookah Bar"	Himesh Reshammiya	Himesh Reshammiya	Himesh Reshammiya, Shannon K	
Pintu Ki Pappi	"Taaka Taaki"	DR NITZ a.k.a. NITIN 'Nitz' Arora	DR NITZ a.k.a. NITIN 'Nitz' Arora, Raman Raghuvanshi		
Pintu Ki Pappi	"Beautiful Sajna"	DR NITZ a.k.a. NITIN 'Nitz' Arora	DR NITZ a.k.a. NITIN 'Nitz' Arora, Raman Raghuvanshi, Sonny KC	Himesh Reshammiya	

=== 2026 ===
Film	Song	Composer(s)	Writer(s)	Co-singer(s)	Ref
Toaster	"Husn Ke Lakhon Rang"	Kalyanji-Anandji	Arun Iyer		
Daadi Ki Shaadi	"Suno Naa Dil"	Gulraj Singh	Manoj Yadav	Sonu Nigam	
Krishnavataram Part 1: The Heart (Hridayam)	"Krishna Govinda"	Prasad S.	Irshad Kamil		
Prahaar: The Untold Story of Ujjwal Nikam	"Mumbai Sapno Ka Samandar"	Emiway Bantai, Swaalina	Emiway Bantai, Swaalina	Emiway Bantai	
Cocktail 2	''Tujhko''	Pritam	Amitabh Bhattacharya	Arijit Singh	
Cocktail 2	''Tujhko - sad''	Pritam	Amitabh Bhattacharya		
Drishyam: The Conclusion	''Daastaab: The Drishyam Recap''	Ravi Basrur	Aamil Keeyan Khan		

=== Unreleased ===
†	Denotes officially unreleased songs
TBA	To Be Announced

Film	Song	Composer(s)	Writer(s)	Co-singer(s)
Koochie Koochie Hota Hai †	"Koi Mil Gaya"	—N/a	—N/a	Kunal Ganjawala, Gayatri Ganjawala
Khallballi - Fun Unlimited †	"Bhuri Bhuri"	Sajid-Wajid	Jalees Sherwani, Shabbir Ahmed	Neeraj Shridhar
Khallballi - Fun Unlimited †	"Bhuri Bhuri (Remix)"	Sajid-Wajid	Jalees Sherwani, Shabbir Ahmed	Neeraj Shridhar
Pareshaanpur	TBA	Raaj Aashoo		

== Hindi non-film songs ==
Year	Album(s)	Song	Composer(s)	Writer(s)	Co-singer(s)
1998	Aira Gaira Nathu Khaira	All songs	Raju Singh	Sameer	Solo
2000	Syndrome of Love	"Mora Kata"	Saba	Saba	Abbey
2001	Sunidhi.C	"Bol Deewane Bol"	Lalit Sen	Nitin Raikwar	
2001	Sunidhi.C	"I Know What You Know"	Lalit Sen	Nitin Raikwar	
2001	Sunidhi.C	"Dil Yeh To Mera"	Lalit Sen	Lalit Sen	
2001	Sunidhi.C	"Kyun Main Naa Jaanoon"	Lalit Sen	Nitin Raikwar	
2001	Sunidhi.C	"Maine Yeh Socha Hai"	Lalit Sen	Naqsh Lyallpuri	
2001	Sunidhi.C	"Mahiya"	Lalit Sen	Nitin Raikwar	
2001	Sunidhi.C	"Dil Tu Hai Rangeela"	Lalit Sen	Nitin Raikwar	
2001	Sunidhi.C	"Main Sawali Saloni"	Lalit Sen	Lalit Sen	
2001	Sunidhi.C	"Pehla Nasha Hai"	Lalit Sen	Nawab Arzoo	
2004	Koie Jane Na	Koie Jane Na (Title song)			
2004	Aaya Bihu Jhoomke	"Aaye Gaye"	Dony Hazarika		Kumar Sanu
2005	24 Carat	"Ga Raha Hai Ye Asmaan"	Raghav Sachar		
2005	24 Carat	"Ga Raha Hai Ye Aasmaan" (Stripped Down Version)	Raghav Sachar		
2006	Ustad & the Divas	"More Piya"	Sandesh Shandilya	Irshad Kamil	Ustad Sultan Khan
2006	Ustad & the Divas	"Billo"	Sandesh Shandilya	Irshad Kamil	Ustad Sultan Khan
2006	Ustad & the Divas	"Hainiya"	Sandesh Shandilya	Irshad Kamil	Ustad Sultan Khan
2006	Ustad & the Divas	"Billo" (Remix Version)	Sandesh Shandilya	Irshad Kamil	Ustad Sultan Khan
2006	Ustad & the Divas	"Billo" (Club Mix Version)	Sandesh Shandilya	Irshad Kamil	Ustad Sultan Khan
2007	Play It Loud	"Dil Hai Ye Dil"	Raghav Sachar		
2007	Breathing Under Water	"Ghost Story"	Anoushka Shankar, Karsh Kale	Indira Varma	
2009	Confluence III: A Meeting By The Nile	"Marhaba Jaanam"	Rahul Sharma		
2009	Charming Lootera	"Dil Hai Ye Dil" (Funked Up Mix Version)	Raghav Sachar		
2011	Teri Aankhen	"Jeele Harpal"	Raaj Aashoo	Murli Agarwal	Raja Hasan
2011	Le Uda Dil	"Ghum Ghum Ghumiyo Re"	Laxmi-Vasant	Laxmi Narayan	Raja Hasan
2012	Salaami Ho Jaye (single)	"Salaami Ho Jaye"	Shamir Tandon	Niket Pandey	Sonu Nigam, Shankar Mahadevan, Shaan, Kailash Kher, Zanai Bhosle, Mohit Chauhan
2013	Ab Laut Aa (single)	"Ab Laut Aa"	Gaurav Dagaonkar	Niranjan Iyengar	
2013	"Betiyaan" (Save the Girl Child)				Shankar Mahadevan, Sonu Nigam
2014	Women's Day Special: Spreading Melodies Everywhere	"Yahin Kahi Aas Paas Hai"	Bappi Lahiri, Sunil Jha, Shakir Ali	Meenu Singh	
2016	Paper Boat Anthem	"Hum Honge Kamyab"			
2018	O.N.E	"Ashiq Awara"	Badshah		
2019	Smile Ke Dekho Dekho (Single)	"Smile Ke Dekho Dekho"			Nakash Aziz
2020	Kuchh Khaab (single)	"Kuchh Khaab"	Daboo Malik	Panchhi Jalonvi	
2021	2X-Side A	"Here is Beautiful"	Shalmali Kholgade	Shalmali Kholgade	Shalmali Kholgade
2021	Ye Ranjishein (Single)	"Ye Ranjishein"	Shruti Rane	Rajesh Manthan	
2021	Dil Todne Se Pehle (Single)	"Dil Todne Se Pehle"	Jass Manak	Jass Manak	
2021	Ishq Tera Mera (Single)	"Ishq Tera Mera"	Hriday Gattani	Shivangi Tewari	Hriday Gattani
2021	Royal Stag T20 World Cup Anthem	"In It To Win It"	Tanishk Bagchi	Vayu	Jassie Gill
2021	Bhoomi 2021	"Ghar Aao Na"	Salim–Sulaiman	Shraddha Pandit	
2022	Shreaam Pagal (Single)	"Shreaam Pagal"	Rox A	Shah Ali	
2022	Firaaq (Single)	"Firaaq"	Daboo Malik	Panchhi Jalonvi	
2022	Sajna (Single)	"Sajna"	Rapper Big Deal	Rapper Big Deal	Shasanka Sekhar
2022	Ve Tu (Single)	"Ve Tu"	Jatinder Shah	Vinder Nathumajra	
2023	Barkhaa (single)	"Barkhaa"	Arijit Singh	Irshad Kamil	
2024	Aankh (single)	"Aankh"	Prateeksha Srivastava, Aman Khare, Paurush Kumar	Prateeksha Srivastava	Rusha & Blizza
2024	Only Love Gets Reply	"Bhari Mehfil"	Ikka Singh, Sanjoy	Ikka Singh	Ikka
2024	Bhoomi 2024	"Chhaila"	Salim–Sulaiman, Raj Pandit	Shraddha Pandit	Shreya Ghoshal
2025	The Malkin Song (single)	"Marzi Ki Malkin"	Parul Gulati	Yashraj Mukhate	
2025	Namkeen Badan (single)	"Namkeen Badan"	Pawan Atwal	Sudhakar Sharma	
2026	Raja Hindustani	"Ye Dil Mujhko Tu Dede"	Mir Desai, King	King	King
2026	Cash Karegi Muniya (single)	"Cash Karegi Muniya"	Sneha Khanwalkar	Abhiruchi Chand	
2026	Asian Paints (single)	"Rang De India"	Sameer Uddin	JUNO	Vishal Dadlani
2026	Aap Jaisa	''Aap Jaisa''	Shashi Preetam	Shashi Preetam	

== Punjabi songs ==
Year	Album	Song	Composer	co-singer(s)
2002	Zindagi Khoobsoorat Hai	"Choodiyaan"		
2004	Asu Nu Maan Watna Da	"Yaara O Dildara"		Harbhajan Mann
2004	Pind Di Kudi	"Muqabla"		Richa Sharma
2005	Yaraan Naal Baharaan	"Le Mein Teri"		Arvinder Singh
2005	Yaraan Naal Baharaan	"Khedan De Din"		Amrinder Gill
2006	Rab Ne Bana Di Jodieain	"Sada Kiye"		Babbu Maan
2006	Rab Ne Bana Di Jodieain	"Kad Pyaar Ho Gaya"		Babbu Maan
2008	The Street of Bollywood 2	"Wanting You (Chaha)"		Shreya Ghoshal
2009	Apni Boli Apana Dess	"Payar"		Sarabjit Cheema
2009	Yaara O Yaara	"Mar Gayee Ve"		Hans Raj Hans
2009	Mitti Wajaan Mardi	"Meriya Dhola"	Harbhajan Mann	
2009	Akhiyan Udek Diyan	"Kaach Da Saaman"		Gurmeet
2009	Lagda Ishq Ho Gaya	"Lagda Ishq Ho Gaya"		Nachhatar Gill, Roshan Prince
2009	Lagda Ishq Ho Gaya	"Tere Naam"		Nachhatar Gill, Roshan Prince
2009	Lagda Ishq Ho Gaya	"College De Din"		Nachhatar Gill, Roshan Prince
2009	Lagda Ishq Ho Gaya	"Taare Khushboo"		Nachhatar Gill, Roshan Prince
2009	Lagda Ishq Ho Gaya	"Allah Khair Kare"		Nachhatar Gill, Roshan Prince
2009	Lagda Ishq Ho Gaya	"English Khana"		Nachhatar Gill, Roshan Prince
2009	Lagda Ishq Ho Gaya	"Nasha Nasha"		Nachhatar Gill, Roshan Prince
2009	Punjabi Fusion	"Mar Gayi Ve"		Hans Raj Hans
2010	Punjabi Groove Volume 2	"Punjabi Munde"		Labh Januja, Daboo Malik, Shakti Singh, Parthiv Gohil, Earl Edgar, Siddharth
2013	Munde Patiyale De	"Akhiyan Nu Need"		Feroz Khan
2013	Power Cut	"Bijli"		
2014	Kirpaan	"Ehsas Da Rishta"		Roshan Prince
2014	Dil Vil Pyaar Vyaar	"Saanu Te Aisa Mahi"		Harshdeep Kaur
2014	Dil Vil Pyaar Vyaar	"Thumka Laaga Lai Sade Naal"		Gurdaas Mann
2014	Dil Vil Pyaar Vyaar	"Shaboo"		
2014	Carry On Jatta	"Raula Pe Gya"		Gippy Grewal
2015	Hero Naam Yaad Rakhi	"Sohneya Sajna"	Ankit Tiwari	Ankit Tiwari
2015	Faraar	"Jatti"		Gippy Grewal
2015	Second Hand Husband	"Jawaani Chaar Din"		Labh Jhanjua
2015	Second Hand Husband	"Channa"		
2016	Duets All The Way	"DJ Te Gulabo Nachdi"		Santokh Singh, Big Sinn
2016	Aatishbazi Ishq	"Chandre Di Nazar Buri"		Supriya Joshi
2017	Saab Bahadur	"Gedha"		Ammy Virk
2017	Ik Onkar	"Jindgi De Beri Meri"		
2017	Super Singh	"Hawa Wich"	Jatinder Shah	Diljit Dosanjh
2018	Vadhiyan Ji Vadhaiyan	"Jind"		Karamjit Anmol
2018	Nankana	"Shagna Di Mehndi"		Gurdas Maan
2018	Khwaab The Dreams	"Manzil"		
2019	Ardaas Karaan	"Satgur Pyare"		Devender Pal Singh
2019	Ardaas Karaan	"Ardaas Karaan (Female)"		
2019	Daaka	"Gaal Theek Ni Lagdi"		Gippy Grewal
2019	Ishq My Reigion	"Laung Gawacha Reply"		Mika Singh, Mukhtar Sahota
2019	Ishq My Reigion	"Kaleh Rang"		Arif Lohar
2019	Ishq My Reigion	"Chori Chori"		Sonu Nigam, Mukhtar Sahota
2019	Lukan Michi	"Ghughia"		Karamjit Anmol
2019	Chandigarh Amritsar Chandigarh	"Ambersar De Papad"	Gippy Grewal	Gippy Grewal
2019	Chandigarh Amritsar Chandigarh	"Ambersar De Papad (Remix)"	Gippy Grewal	Gippy Grewal feat. DJ Badal
2019	Baaji	"Gangster Guriya"		Taha Malik
2019	Dar Khul Gaya Babe Nanak Da	"Dar Khul Gaya Babe Nanak Da"		Jasbir Jassi, Jyoti Nooran, Daler Mehndi, Javed Ali, Devender Singh
2020	No Competition	"Yaara Tere Warga"	Jass Manak	Jass Manak
2020	Punjabi Dance Mashup	"Punjabi Dance Mashup"		The Landers, Gippy Grewal, Sunidhi Chauhan, Simar Dardi, Parmish Verma, Preet Harpal
2021	Thodi Si Raat Nashe	"Thodi Si Raat Nashe"		
2021	Shava Ni Girdhari Lal	"Gori Diyan Jhanjhran"	Jatinder Shah	
2022	Ni Main Sass Kutni	"Ni Main Sass Kutni"		
2025	Ardab	"Aya Lagda"	Jorban	Jorban
2025	Maa Jaye	"Tere Ishq Ch"	Jaidev Kumar	Devinder Khannewala
2025	Majhail	"Sohneya"	Happy Raikoti	Happy Raikoti

== Pakistani film songs ==
Year	Film	Song	Co-singer(s)
2002	Pyar Hi Pyar Mein	"Peehu Peehu"	
2006	Mein Ek Din Laut Kay Aaoon Ga	"Cherey Badal Jaate Hain"	
2007	Mohabbataan Sachiyaan	"Galiyan Galiyan Husan Diyaan"	Hunterz
2011	Love Mein Ghum	"Ilah Ilah"	Hunterz
2013	Anjuman	"Aap Dil Ki Anjuman Mein"	
2013	Anjuman	"Dil Dharke Main Tum Se"	
2013	Aina	"Ruthey Ho Tum"	Shaan
2018	Zeher-e-Ishq	""	
2019	Baaji	"Gangster Guriya"	
2019	Superstar	"Noori"	Jabar Abbas

== Marathi films ==
Year	Film	Song	Composer(s)	Writer(s)	Co-singer(s)
2008	Sanai Choughade	"Kande Pohe"	Avadhoot Gupte		Solo
2009	Hay Kay Nay Kay	"Hay Kay Nay Kay"	Saleel Kulkarni	Sandeep Khare	Solo
2009	Hay Kay Nay Kay	"Dehi Vanava Pisatala"	Saleel Kulkarni	Sandeep Khare	Solo
2011	Superstar	"Mazya Naadi Kuni Lagu Naka"	Ajit-Sameer	Guru Thakur	Solo
2012	Hridayanath	"Yana Yana"	Santosh Mulekar	Guru Thakur	Solo
2012	Satrangi Re	"Nave He Vishwa"	Ajay Naik	Shrirang Godbole	Solo
2012	No Entry Pudhe Dhoka Aahey	"Zapun Zapun"	Sargam-Nakash	Guru Thakur	Anu Malik
2014	Vitti Dandu	"Maru Naka Pichkari"	Santosh Mulekar	Shrirang Godbole	Solo
2015	Just Gammat	"Bewda Bewda"	Nitin Kumar Gupta	Francis	Nitin Kumar Gupta
2017	Bhikari	"Ye Ata"	Vishal Mishra	Guru Thakur	Vishal Mishra
2017	Boyz	"Kutha Kutha Jayacha"	Avadhoot Gupte	Jagdish Khebudkar, Avadhoot Gupte	Solo
2018	Baban	"Mohrachya Daravar"	Onkarswaroop	Dr. Vinayak Pawar	Shalmali Kholgade
2019	Menka Urvashi	"Menaka Urvashi"	Rajesh Sarkate	Yogiraj Mane	Solo
2019	Smile Please	"Anolkhi"	Rohan-Rohan	Manndar Cholkar	Solo
2019	Kulkarni Chaukatla Deshpande	"Aabhalachya Gavala"	Soumil, Siddharth	Gajendra Ahire	Solo
2020	Rahasya	"Kasle He Rahasya"	Prem Kotwal	Prem Kotwal	Solo
2022	Roop Nagar Ke Cheetey	"Thambli Kashi Hi Kahani"	Shaan Rahman	Jai Atre	Solo
2022	Ekda Kaay Zala	"Balala Zop Ka Ga Yet Nahi"	Saleel Kulkarni	Sandeep Khare	Solo
2023	Chhapa Kata	"Man He Guntale"	Mukul Kashikar	Shivam Barpande	Solo
2025	Avkarika	"Ka Re Baba"	Shreyas Deshpande	Arvind Bhosale	Solo
2025	Aatli Baatmi Futlii	"Jalim Savkar"	Vishal Gandhi	Chaitanya Kulkarni	Agnel Roman
2026	Tula Pahata	"Lagna-Bigna"	Rohan-Rohan	Rohan Gokhale	Rohan Pradhan
2026	70 Syaal	''Shukrana''	Vinder Nathu Majra	Vinder Nathu Majra	The Junior

== English songs ==
Year	Song	Album(s)	Producer(s)	Writer(s)	Co-singer(s)
2010	"Heartbeat"	Euphoria	Mark Taylor	Enrique Iglesias, Jamie Scott, Mark Taylor	Enrique Iglesias
2021	"Here is Beautiful"	—N/a	Sunny M.R.	Shalmali Kholgade	Shalmali Kholgade

== Tamil films ==
Year	Film	Song	Composer	Co-singer(s)
2001	Samrat Ashoka	"Kaathirukudhu"	Anu Malik	
2003	Dhool	"Kundu Kundu"	Vidyasagar	KK, Pop Shalini
2004	Ghilli	"Shalla la Shalla la"	Vidyasagar	
2005	Mumbai Xpress	"Kurangu Kaiyil"	Ilaiyaraaja	Kamal Haasan, Sonu Nigam, Shreya Ghoshal, Shaan
2005	Mumbai Xpress	"Yele Nee"	Ilaiyaraaja	
2006	Vallavan	"Vallava Enai"	Yuvan Shankar Raja	
2006	Dhoom 2	"Crazy Aanene"	Pritam	
2006	Dhoom 2	"Crazy Aanene" (Remix)	Pritam	
2008	Kuruvi	"Happy New Year"	Vidyasagar	Yogi B, Dr. Burn, Emcee Jesz
2008	Kaalai	"Gutka Lakadi"	G. V. Prakash Kumar	Lucky Ali
2008	Thoondil	"Kadhal Kadavulai Pole"	Abhishek Ray	Abhishek Ray
2008	Thoondil	"Ratham Sindhaatha"	Abhishek Ray	
2012	Nanban	"Irukkana Iduppirukkana"	Harris Jayaraj	Vijay Prakash, Javed Ali
2012	Neethaane En Ponvasantham	"Mudhal Murai"	Ilaiyaraaja	
2013	Dhoom 3	"Amali Dhumali"	Pritam	
2014	Jilla	"Jingunamani"	D. Imman	Ranjith
2014	Oru Modhal Oru Kadhal	"Punjabiya Partha"	K.R. Kawin	Shankar Mahadevan
2014	Aaha Kalyanam	"Bon Bon"	Dharan Kumar	Haricharan
2014	Maan Karate	"Darling Dumbakku"	Anirudh Ravichander	Benny Dayal
2014	Aindhaam Thalaimurai Sidha Vaidhiya Sigamani	"Onnuna Rendu Varum"	Simon	Vijay Antony
2014	Kaththi	"Selfie Pulla" (Version l)	Anirudh Ravichander	C. Joseph Vijay
2014	Kaththi	"Selfie Pilla" (Version ll)	Anirudh Ravichander	
2015	Anegan	"Roja Kadale"	Harris Jayaraj	Shankar Mahadevan, Chinmayi
2015	Valiyavan	"Yelomia"	D. Imman	
2017	Saravanan Irukka Bayamaen	"Laala Kada Saanthi"	D. Imman	Benny Dayal
2018	Thugs of Hindostan	"Manna Ketkudha"	Ajay–Atul	Shreya Ghoshal, Divya Kumar
2018	Silukkuvarupatti Singam	"Dio Rio Diya"	Leon James	Naresh Iyer, Santhosh Hariharan
2019	Namma Veettu Pillai	"Yenga Annan"	D. Imman	Nakash Aziz
2019	Sye Raa Narasimha Reddy	"Sye Raa Title Track"	Amit Trivedi	Shreya Ghoshal
2021	Laabam	"Clara My Name is Clara"	D. Imman	
2022	Kaathu Vaakula Rendu Kaadhal	"Two Two Two"	Anirudh Ravichander	Sanjana Kalmanje
2022	Vikrant Rona	"Raa Raa Rakamma"	B. Ajaneesh Loknath	Nakash Aziz
2022	Samrat Prithviraj	"Undhan Padai Anbae"	Shankar–Ehsaan–Loy	

== Kannada films ==
Year	Film	Song name	Composer	Writer(s)	Co-singer(s)
2002	Hollywood	"Aeeeyy Aeeyyii"	Gurukiran		
2002	Kodanda Rama	"Hungama"	V. Ravichandran		Suresh Peters
2003	Hello	"Singapuralli"	Srishaila		KK
2004	Rowdy Aliya	"Nanagintha Yaaru"	Babji-Sandeep		KK
2004	Love	"Yelu Bannada"	Anu Malik		KK
2004	Bidalare	"Too Much"	KM Indhra		
2005	Jogi	"Chikubuku Railu"	Gurukiran		Hariharan, B. Jayashree
2005	Shree	"Joke Joke"	Valisha – Sandeep		Solo
2005	Anna Thangi	"Gandasu Horagade"	Hamsalekha		Solo
2005	Aham Premasmi	Kannalley	V. Ravichandran		Sonu Nigam
2006	Mungaru Male	"Kunidu Kunidu Baare"	Mano Murthy		Udit Narayan
2007	Cheluvina Chittara	"Kanaso Idu"	Mano Murthy		Sonu Nigam
2007	Naanu Neenu Jodi	"Jum Naranadi"	Hamsalekha		Rajesh Krishnan
2007	Maathaad Maathaadu Mallige	"Baaro Nanna"	Mano Murthy		Solo
2007	Ee Bandhana	"Banna Banna"	Mano Murthy		Kunal Ganjawala
2008	Madesha	"Thattarammayya"	Mano Murthy		Hemanth
2008	Chaitrada Chandrama	"Nooraru Janmada"	S. Narayan		Kunal Ganjawala
2008	Haage Summane	"Haadonave"	Mano Murthy		Kunal Ganjawala
2008	Shivani	"Savi Savi Preethi"	James J. Sakleshpur		Kunal Ganjawala
2009	Gulama	"Taare Annuthare"	Gurukiran		Solo
2009	Maccha	"Fanaa"	Arjun Janya		Kunal Ganjawala
2010	Prithvi	"Ku Ku Kogileyinda"	Manikanth Kadri		Rajesh Krishnan
2010	Antharathma	"Nindalla Kala Nandu Baa Habeebi"	Giridhar Diwan		Solo
2010	Huduga Hudugi	"Saathiyaa"	Joshua Sridhar		Solo
2010	Bisile	"Nannusiru"	Gagan Hari		Kunal Ganjawala
2010	Preethi Nee Shaswathana	"Nooru Nooru Premigalalli"	K. Kalyan		Udit Narayan
2011	Gun	"Alibaba"	Ronnie Raphael		Solo
2011	I Am Sorry Mathe Banni Preethsona	"Kuni Kuni"	Anoop Seelin		Arasu Anthare
2012	Kalaya Tasmai Namaha	"Naanenu Alla"	A. M. Neel	Vardhan	
2013	Tony	"Andaaje Sigutilla"	Sadhu Kokila	Jayanth Kaikini	Sonu Nigam
2014	Aryan	"Kannada Mannina"	Jassie Gift		Puneeth Rajkumar
2019	Sye Raa Narasimha Reddy (Dubbed version)	"Sye Raa Title Track"	Amit Trivedi		Shreya Ghoshal
2021	Butterfly	"Khuddagi Bhoomiyinda"	Amit Trivedi		
2022	Vikrant Rona	"Ra Ra Rakamma"	B. Ajaneesh Loknath	Anup Bhandari	Nakash Aziz
2026	Koragajja	"Pokura Man Bhara"	Gopi Sundar	Sudheer Attavar	

== Telugu films ==
Year	Film	Song name	Composer
1999	Mallika	"Chalo Chalo"	Sandeep Chowta
1999	Mallika	"Ney Masth" (Female)	Sandeep Chowta
2001	Lady Bachelors	"Rathraina Pagalaina"	Vandemataram Srinivas
2002	Kubusam	"Eduru Kallu"	Vandemataram Srinivas
2002	Kalalu Kandham Raa	"Madilo Nee Roopame"	Ramesh erra
2002	Kalalu Kandham Raa	"Tight Jensulo"	Ramesh erra
2002	Nenu Ninnu Premisthunnanu	"I Love You"	Shashi preetam
2002	Nee Thodu Kaavali	"Jaanebeedo"	Valisha babji
2002	Malli Malli Chudali	"Suparu"	Yuvan Shankar Raja
2003	Oops	"Ragilinche"	Ravi Pawar
2004	Goa	"Nasha Nasha"	Krishna vasa
2004	Monalisa	"Naa Manasantha"	Valisha babji
2005	Allari Bullodu	"Ataku Meeda"	M. M. Keeravani
2005	Anukokunda Oka Roju	"I Wanna Swing"	M. M. Keeravani
2005	Anukokunda Oka Roju	"Naa Naa Parugutesina"	M. M. Keeravani
2005	Maayam	"You Are My Super Man"	Ajay–Atul
2006	Dhoom 2	"Crazy Ayyane"	Pritam
2006	Dhoom 2	"Crazy Ayyane" (Remix)	Pritam
2006	Twinkle Twinkle Little Star	"Jaamu Reyilo Rege Yavvanam"	Ilaiyaraaja
2006	Samanyudu	"Veedu Yama"	Vandemataram Srinivas
2008	Kantri	"Raamare"	Mani Sharma
2008	Chintakayala Ravi	"Valla Valla"	Vishal–Shekhar
2008	Michael Madana Kamaraju	"Naa Raasi Kanya Raasi"	Chakri
2008	Nagaram	"Hoshiyare Hoshiyare"	Chakri
2008	Victory	"O Bachelor"	Chakri
2009	Oy!	"Saradaga"	Yuvan Shankar Raja
2009	A Aa E Ee	"Kasiki Poyanu"	M. M. Srilekha
2009	Maska	"Bhagdad Gajadongai Vasta"	Chakri
2010	Kedi	"Kedigaadu"	Sandeep Chowtha
2010	Kedi	"Kedigaadu" (Orchestra Version)	Sandeep Chowtha
2010	Om Shanti	"Chinna Polike" (Duet)	Ilaiyaraaja
2010	Om Shanti	"Chinna Polike" (Solo)	Ilaiyaraaja
2011	Badrinath	"Nath Nath"	M. M. Keeravani
2012	Yeto Vellipoyindi Manasu	"Atu Itu"	Ilaiyaraaja
2012	Kameena	"Nuvvu Nuvvu"	Agastya
2013	Dhoom 3	"Nemali"	Pritam
2013	Kevvu Keka	"Babu Hey RamBabu"	Bheems Ceciroleo
2014	Aaha Kalyanam	"No One Dancing Here U"	Dharan Kumar
2017	Angel	"Chinni Chinni"	Bheems Cecirolio
2018	Thugs Of Hindostan	"Majjaaree Khudaa"	Ajay–Atul
2019	Sye Raa Narasimha Reddy	"Sye Raa Title Track"	Amit Trivedi
2019	First Rank Raju	"Ayyo Rama"	Kiran Ravindranath
2022	F3	"Woo Aaa Aha Aha"	Devi Sri Prasad
2022	Samrat Prithviraj	"Yoddha"	Shankar–Ehsaan–Loy
2025	Game Changer	"Jaragandi"	Thaman S

== Malayalam films ==
- Anthiponvettam – Jashne Jawani
- Kandahar – Dheemee Dheemee
- Dracula 2012 – Prince of Darkness
- Samrajyam II: Son of Alexander – Kettu Pottiya Pole
- Sye Raa Narasimha Reddy (Dubbed version) — "Sye Raa Title Track" (with Shreya Ghoshal)

== Assamese songs ==
Year	Film/Album	Song	Composer(s)	Co-artist(s)
2002	Mitha Mitha Laganat	"Upoja Gaon Khoni"	Manash Hazarika	Zubeen Garg
2002	Premgeet	"Nila Nila Dusakute"	Manash Hazarika	Zubeen Garg
2003	Hitlist	"Hiyar Nayane Nayane" (Version 2)	Sadananda Gogoi	Zubeen Garg, Munmi Baruah
2003	Basonar Phul	"Sakhi Diyana Diha"		Solo
2011	Ramdhenu	"Tupi Tupi"	Jatin Sharma	Zubeen Garg
2026	Prem Jibanor Gaan	''Prem Jibanor Gaan''	Abhijit Barman	Abhijit Barman

== Odia songs ==
Year	Film	No	Song	Composer(s)	Co-artist(s)
2010	Tora Mora Jodi Sundara	"Tu Chunie Delu"		Shaan	
2013	Salaam Cinema	"Sutani Bayasa Mora"	Abhijeet Majumdar	Sujit Bhoy	

== Bhojpuri songs ==
- Deswa —Sautan Jar Mare

== Bengali songs ==
=== Film songs ===
Year	Film	Song	Composer(s)	Co-artist(s)
2002	Bor Kone	"E Deho Mon"	Ashish Kumar	
2002	Jibon Judh	"Keu Na Keu"	Babul Bose	Poulomi Mukharjee
2002	Phool Aur Pathar	"Amar Boyesh"	Bappi Lahiri	
2002	Pratihinsa	"Tetulmane Tak"	Tabun	Jojo
2002	Deva	"Tumi Je Monalisa"	Bappi Lahiri	Shaan
2003	Raktha Bandhan	"Gache Dil Dhoreche"	Anu Malik	
2004	Agun Jolbei	"Keu Na Keu Aasbei"	Babul Bose	Poulomi Mukherjee
2004	Kuyasha	"Ei Aakash" (Duet)	Soumitra Kundu	Udit Narayan
2004	Kuyasha	"Neshay Matal"	Soumitra Kundu	Jolly Mukherjee
2004	Swami Chintai	"E Moner Darja"	Babul Bose	Kumar Sanu
2004	Swami Chintai	"Rupe Acche Jochona"	Babul Bose	
2004	Swami Chintai	"Rupe Achhe Jochona" (Version ll)	Babul Bose	
2007	Bidhataar Lekha	"Ki Hobe Janina"	Lalit Pandit	
2008	Shibaji	"Aaro Kachakachi"	Bappi Lahiri	
2010	Hangover	"Made in India"	Bappi Lahiri	
2010	Rehmat Ali	"Saiyaan Bina Ghar"	Bappi Lahiri	
2010	Antim Swash Sunder	"Ui Amma"	Purbayan Chatterje	
2010	Besh Korechi Prem Korechi	"Brishti Bheja Tomay Dekhe"	Kumar Sanu	
2012	Ekla Akash	"Diwani"	Jeet Gannguli	
2012	Macho Mustanaa	"Bailamos"	Samidh Mukherjee	Kunal Ganjawala
2012	Target Kolkata	"Hele Dhorte Pare Na"		
2013	Hawa Bodol	"Bhoy Dekhas Na Please"	Indradip Dasgupta	
2013	Tiyasha	"Kokhono Ke Andhar Theke"	Aninda Bose	
2013	Swabhoomi	"Chikni Sahab Nashili"	Bappi Lahiri	Bappi Lahiri
2014	Taarkata	"Bondhon"	Arfin Rumey	
2016	Potadhar Kirtee	"Kichu Kichu Kotha"	Bappi Lahiri	
2018	Jole Jongole	"Banzara Yeh Dil"	Jeet Gannguli	Rana Mazumder
2018	Moner Majhe Tumi	"Aalo Ta Aar"	Bappi Lahiri	
2019	Lime N Light	"Superstar"		Anweshaa
2025	Mrigaya: The Hunt	"Shor Machaa"	Rana Mazumder, Nirupam Dutta	Rana Mazumder, Nirupam Dutta
2026	Ghun Gaon: Chapter - 1	"Tun Tun Tunak Tun"	Tunai Debasish Ganguly	

=== Album songs ===
Year	Film	Song	Composer(s)	Co-artist(s)
2013	Tagore & We 2	"Sei Bhalo Sei Bhalo"	Soumyojit	Soumyojit
2013	Tagore & We 2	"Swakatore Oi"	Soumyojit	Soumyojit
2013	Tagore & We 2	"Megh Boleche Jabo Jabo"	Soumyojit	Soumyojit
2013	Tagore & We 2	"Tomay Gaan Shonabo"	Soumyojit	
2013	Tagore & We 2	Ektuku Chhoya Lage"	Soumyojit	
2020	Devkir Krishno Tumi	"Devkir Krishno Tumi"		
2020	Single	"Dugga Dugga"	Kaushik-Guddu	

== Gujarati songs ==
- Ratanpur - Ude Aaje
- Family Circus - Todi Didhi Chhe Mein

== Television series ==
- Kahi To Milenge – Title Song
- Kkoi Dil Mein Hai – Title Song (with Shreya Ghoshal)
- Shararat – Title Song
- Kaahin Kissii Roz – Title Song
- Kareena Kareena – Title Song
- Raat Hone Ko Hai – Title Song
- Hitler Didi – Title Song
- Kitni Mast Hai Zindagi – Title Song
- Dhoondh Legi Manzil Humein – Title Song
- Zara Nach Ke Dikha 2 – Title Song
- Tumhari Paakhi – Bolo Na Dil Se
- Ek Hasina Thi – Title Track
- Ben 10 – Title Song
- The Casino - Title Song
- Rickshaw - "Saheli"
