= List of awards and nominations received by K. S. Chithra =

Awards
- Awards and honours: Wins
International honours	12
Indian honours system	2
National Honours	2
State Government Honours	7
National Film Awards	6
Indian honorifics	11
Kerala State Film Awards	16
Andhra Pradesh State Film Awards	11
Tamil Nadu State Film Awards	4
Karnataka State Film Awards	3
Orissa State Film Awards	1
West Bengal State Film Awards	1
Filmfare Awards South	10
Asianet Film Awards	7
CineMAA Awards	3
Mathrubhumi Film Awards	7
Mirchi Music Awards South	18
Asiavision Awards	3
Bollywood Movie Awards	1
Star Screen Awards	3
MTV Video Music Award	1
MTV Immies	1
Cinema Express Awards	9
Global Indian Music Academy Awards	1
Reporter TV Awards	1
Film Fans Association Awards	20
Gamma Indian Music Awards	4
Gulf Malayalam Music Awards (GMMA)	3
Santosham Film Awards	3
Kerala Film Critics Association Awards	7
South Indian International Movie Awards	4
Mazhavil Mango Music Awards	2
List of lifetime achievement awards	11
Other awards	71
Total	500+

Krishnan Nair Shantakumari Chithra, often credited as K. S. Chithra or simply Chithra, is an Indian playback singer and carnatic musician from Kerala. Chithra also sings Indian classical, devotional, and popular music. Chithra, renowned for her extraordinary vocal talent, is widely recognized as the Golden Voice of India, a title bestowed upon her by the prestigious Royal Albert Hall, London in 2001. The Times Group has honored her as the Melody Queen of Indian Cinema in 2016, reflecting her immense contribution to the industry. She is also celebrated as the Little Nightingale of Indian Cinema, Nightingale of South India, and in different regions, she is known by various affectionate titles: Piya Basanti in North India, Vanambadi in Kerala, Chinna Kuyil in Tamil Nadu, Kannada Kogile in Karnataka, and Sangeeta Saraswathi in Andhra Pradesh and Telangana states.

Chithra is a recipient of 6 National Film Awards, 10 Filmfare Awards South and 43 State Government awards from 8 states of India including 18 from Kerala, 12 from United Andhra Pradesh, 5 from Tamil Nadu, 4 from Karnataka, and 1 each from Odisha, West Bengal, Madhya Pradesh and Maharashtra governments. She was awarded India's third-highest civilian honours Padma Bhushan in 2021 and Padma Shri in 2005 for her valuable contributions towards the Indian musical fraternity.

She is honoured with the title First Ladies by the President of India in 2018 for being the first Indian woman to be honoured by British Parliament at House of Commons, United in 2003. In 2024, she was again honoured by the British Parliament, United Kingdom, with the title The Greatest Indian Singer of All Times. In 2009, She became the first Indian artist to be honoured by Government of China while performing live at the Qinghai International river festival. In 2018, She was honoured by the Speaker of General Assembly, United States. Barring Lata Mangeshkar, she also remains the second female playback singer from India to have performed at the prestigious Royal Albert Hall in London in 2001 and her Performance was applauded with much appreciation by a roomful of an international audience.

Her song "Kannalane/Kehna Hi Kya" from the film Bombay (1995) was included in United Kingdom The Guardian's "1000 Songs Everyone Must Hear Before You Die" list. She is conferred with the highest honour of Rotary International, For the Sake of Honour Award in 2001 and has received the MTV Video Music Award – International Viewer's Choice at the Metropolitan Opera House, New York in 2001. She received honorary doctorates from Sathyabama University in 2011 and from The International Tamil University, United States in 2018.

== International honours ==
- 2003 - Honoured by the British Parliament at the House of Commons in United Kingdom - (First Indian woman to achieve this feat)
- 2001 - GOLDEN VOICE OF INDIA - Royal Albert Hall, London
- 2001 - MTV Video Music Award – International Viewer's Choice at Metropolitan Opera House, New York, United States (only singer from South India to achieve this feet)
- 2009 - Honoured by the Government of China at Qinghai International Festival - (only Indian to achieve this feat)
- 2018 - Honoured by Stephen M. Sweeney, President of New Jersey Senate and Craig Coughlin, the Speaker of New Jersey General Assembly, United States
- 2019 - Honoured by Sultan bin Muhammad Al-Qasimi, sovereign ruler of the Emirate of Sharjah and is a member of the Federal Supreme Council of the United Arab Emirates, UAE for successfully completing 40 Years in Indian Film Industry
- 2024 - Honored by the British Parliament, United Kingdom, with the title The Greatest Indian Singer of All Times.
- 2025 - She was formally honoured by the Parliament of South Australia in recognition of her outstanding contributions to Indian music.
- 2025 - She was honoured by the Texas House of Representatives, Government of Texas, United States of America, for her lasting contributions to music and the arts.
- 2025 - she was honoured in the United States with a Joint Legislative Resolution from the State of New Jersey and a Mayoral Proclamation from the Township of Edison for her outstanding contributions to music and philanthropy.
- 2025 - On October 19, 2025, the K. S. Chithra Day was proclaimed by the Shelby County Government in Memphis, Tennessee via a mayoral proclamation from the Office of the Mayor.
- 2025 - She was honoured by the Government of Sharjah, United Arab Emirates, with a Lifetime Achievement Award in recognition of her distinguished contributions to Indian music and her five-decade-long career.

== National honours ==
- 2021 – Padma Bhushan – India's third highest civilian honour
- 2005 – Padma Shri – India's fourth highest civilian honour
- 2001 - National Excellence Award 2001 by Limca Book of Records
- 2018 - Rashtrapati Award for being the "First Ladies" in the field of music felicitated by the Ministry of Women and Child Development of Government of India at the Rashtrapati Bhavan on 20 January 2018.

== State government honours ==
- 1997 – Kalaimamani Award – Government of Tamil Nadu
- 2011 – Lata Mangeshkar Award – Government of Andhra Pradesh for Cultural Council
- 2013 - Sangeeta Samman Puraskar (P B Srinivas) Award by the Government of Karnataka
- 2014 – Vanita Ratnam Award (Kamala Surayya Award) by Government of Kerala for Social Welfare Department
- 2018 - Harivarasanam Award by the Government of Kerala
- 2023 - Lata Mangeshkar Award by the Government of Madhya Pradesh
- 2024 - 15th Ram Kadam Art Glory Award (Kala Gaurav Puraskar), Maharastra

== Indian honorifics ==
- 2011 – Honorary Doctorate – Sathyabama University, Chennai, Tamil Nadu
- 2018 – Honorary Doctorate – The International Tamil University United States
- Kalaimamani
- Kalaiselvam
- Gana priya
- Kala Ratna
- Kala srestha
- Sangeetha Ratnam
- Swara Ratna
- Sathkeerthi
- Sangeetha Ganendhuchooda
- Vanitha Ratnam
- Stree Ratna

== Lifetime achievement awards ==
- 2003 – Lifetime Achievement Award from Global Malayali council London
- 2003 – Swaralaya Yesudas Award Lifetime Achievement Award
- 2005 – SIKHARAM – 15 lifetime achievement award 2005 from India Today
- 2005 – Jeevan TV – P. Jayachandran Lifetime Achievement Award 2005
- 2007 – Aginhotri lifetime achievement award 2007 from Samorin of Calicut
- 2014 - Lifetime Achievement Award from Raindropss a youth-based social organization on the occasion of Women's Day
- 2017 – V.C.Padmanabhan memorial award for lifetime achievement from manappuram finance Ltd.
- 2018 - Legend of the Year Award - RED FM MUSIC AWARDS 2018
- 2019 - Women achievers, News7 Tamil's Thangatharagai Lifetime Achievement award for being as an inspiring women icon and for her outstanding achievements
- 2019 - Most Socially Committed Lifetime Achievement Award - Ishal Laila Awards 2019, Dubai
- 2019 - "Excellence in the field of Music Award" - JFW Women Achievers
- 2021 - "Mirchi Music's Lifetime Achievement Award" for extraordinary contribution to South-Indian Film Music

== National Film Awards ==
Chithra has won six National Awards for best female playback singer, the highest by any female playback singer.

- 1986 – Best Female Playback Singer – "Padariyen Padippariyen, Naan Oru Sindhu" (Sindhu Bhairavi, Tamil)
- 1987 – Best Female Playback Singer – "Manjal Prasadavum" (Nakhakshathangal, Malayalam)
- 1989 – Best Female Playback Singer – "Indupushpam Choodi Nilkum Raathri" (Vaishali, Malayalam)
- 1996 – Best Female Playback Singer – "Maana Madurai" (Minsaara Kanavu, Tamil)
- 1997 – Best Female Playback Singer – "Payalein Chun Mun" (Virasat, Hindi)
- 2004 – Best Female Playback Singer – "Ovvoru Pookalume" (Autograph, Tamil)

== Filmfare Awards ==
- 1998: Nominated—Best Female Playback Singer - "Payaley Chunmun" (Virasat)
- 2004: Nominated— Best Female Playback Singer - "Koi Milgaya" (Koi... Mil Gaya)

== Filmfare Awards South ==
She is a singer with 22 Filmfare Awards South Nominations, resulting in 10 wins for 3 different languages- highest by any singer (Shares the record with Shreya Ghoshal). She holds the record of winning Filmfare Awards South for record number of times in Malayalam & Telugu i.e.,6 & 3 times respectively. She has a record for being the oldest winning singer at the age of 61 years

- 2004: Best Female Playback Singer – Telugu – "Nuvvostanante" (Varsham)
- 2006: Best Female Playback Singer – Malayalam – "Kalabham Tharam" (Vadakkumnadhan)
- 2006: Best Female Playback Singer – Kannada – "Araluva Hoovugale" (My Autograph)
- 2008: Best Female Playback Singer – Malayalam – "Oduvil Oru" (Thirakkatha)
- 2009: Best Female Playback Singer – Malayalam – "Kunnathe Konnakyum" (Pazhassiraja)
- 2013: Best Female Playback Singer – Telugu – "Seethammavaakitlo" (Seethamma Vakitlo Sirimalle Chettu)
- 2016: Best Female Playback Singer – Telugu – "Ee Premaki" (Nenu Sailaja)
- 2017: Best Female Playback Singer - Malayalam - "Nadavathil" (Kambhoji)
- 2022: Best Female Playback Singer - Malayalam - "Theerame" (Malik)
- 2024: Best Female Playback Singer - Malayalam - "Muttathe Mulla" (Jawanum mullappoovum)

Nominations

- 2005: Nominated— Best Female Playback Singer – Telugu - "Manasa Manasa" (Nireekshana)
- 2006: Nominated— Best Female Playback Singer – Telugu - "Muvvala Navvakala" (Pournami)
- 2006: Nominated— Best Female Playback Singer – Telugu - "Manasavacha" (Godavari)
- 2009: Nominated—Best Female Playback Singer - Kannada - "Nadheem Dheem Tana" (Gaalipata)
- 2011: Nominated—Best Female Playback Singer - Malayalam - "Malakha Pole" (Mummy & Me)
- 2013: Nominated—Best Female Playback Singer - Malayalam - "Vishukkili Kanippoo Kondu Vaa" (Ivan Megharoopan)
- 2015: Nominated—Best Female Playback Singer – Telugu - "Marhaba" (Malli Malli Idi Rani Roju) (shared the nomination with Aishwarya)
- 2016: Nominated—Best Female Playback Singer - Tamil - "Konji Pesida Venaam" (Sethupathi)
- 2021: Nominated—Best Female Playback Singer - Tamil - "Yennuyire" (Annathae)
- 2022: Nominated—Best Female Playback Singer - Telugu - "Antha Ishtam" (Bheemla Nayak)
- 2023: Nominated—Best Female Playback Singer - Tamil - "veera raja veera" (Ponniyin Selvan: I)
- 2023: Nominated—Best Female Playback Singer - Malayalam - "Ee Mazhamukilo" (Jaladhara Pumpset since 1962)

== IIFA Utsavam ==
- Nominations
- 2017: IIFA Utsavam for Best Female Singer - "Maye Maye" (Jessie)

== Kerala State Film Awards ==
Chithra is the highest recipient of Kerala State Awards under the "Best Playback Singer Female" category & she has won it for 16 times with a record of winning them for 11 times in a row i.e.,(1985–1995)

- 2016 – Best Play Back Singer – "Nadavathil Thurannilla" (Kambhoji)
- 2005 – Best Play Back Singer – "Mayangipoyi" (Nottam)
- 2002 – Best Play Back Singer – "Karmukil Varnante" (Nandanam)
- 2001 – Best Play Back Singer – "Mooli Mooli" (Theerthadanam)
- 1999 – Best Play Back Singer – "Pular Veyilum" (Angane Oru Avadhikkalathu)
- 1995 – Best Play Back Singer – "Sasikala Charthiya" (Devaraagam)
- 1994 – Best Play Back Singer – "Parvanenthu" (Parinayam)
- 1993 – Best Play Back Singer – "Ponmeghame" (Sopanam), "Rajahamsame" (Chamayam), "Sangeethame" (Gazal)
- 1992 – Best Play Back Singer – "Mounasarovaram" (Savidham)
- 1991 – Best Play Back Singer – "Thaaram" (Keli), "Swarakanyakamar" (Santhwanam)
- 1990 – Best Play Back Singer – "Kannil Nin Meyyil" (Innale), "Palappoove" (Njan Gandharvan)
- 1989 – Best Play Back Singer – "Kalarivilakku" (Oru Vadakkan Veeragatha), "Thankathoni" (Mazhavilkavadi)
- 1988 – Best Play Back Singer – "Indupushpam" (Vaishali)
- 1987 – Best Play Back Singer – "Eenam marannakatte" (Eenam Maranna Kattu), "Thalolam Paithal" (Ezhuthappurangal)
- 1986 – Best Play Back Singer – "Manjalprasadavum" (Nakhakshathangal)
- 1985 – Best Play Back Singer – "Oreswaram Ore Niram" (Ente Kaanakkuyil), "Poomaname" (Nirakkoottu), "Aayiram Kannumai" (Nokkethadhoorathu Kannum Nattu)

== Andhra Pradesh State Film Awards ==
Chithra is the highest recipient of Andhra Pradesh State Awards under the "Best Playback Singer Female" category & she has won it for 11 times with a record of winning them for 4 times in a row i.e.,(1990–1993)

Year	Film name	Song
1990	Seetharamaiah Gari Manavaralu	Kaliki Chilakala Koliki
1991	Rajeswari Kalyanam	Endaro Mahanubhavulu
1992	Sundarakanda	Akasana Suryudu
1993	Mathru Devo Bhava	Venuvai Vachhanu
1996	Maavichiguru	Maata Ivvamma
1997	Bombay Priyudu	Pranayama
1998	Anveshitha	Anveshitha
1999	Swayamvaram	Marala Thelupana
2004	Varsham	Nuvvostanante Neddontana
2009	Kalavaramaye Madilo	Pallavinchani
2014	Mukunda	Gopikamma

== Tamil Nadu State Film Awards ==
Chithra has won the Tamil Nadu State Awards under the "Best Playback Singer Female" category for 4 times.

Year	Film name	Song
2004	Autograph	Ovvoru Pookalume
1995	Bombay	Kannalane
1990	Vaigaasi Porandhaachu	Chinna ponnu dhaan
1988	Multiple films	

== Karnataka State Film Awards ==
- 1997 – Best Female Playback Singer – "Hele Kogile Impagalaa" (Nammoora Mandara Hoove)
- 2001 – Best Female Playback Singer – "Navileno Kunibeku" (Gattimela)
- 2005 – Best Female Playback Singer – "Kandamma Kandamma" (Maharaja)

== Odisha State Film Awards ==
- 1993 – Odisha State Film Award for Best Singer – "Mo Kanhu Re" (Asha)

== West Bengal State Film Awards ==
- 1995 – West Bengal State Film Award for Best Female Singer – "Aay Re Basanta Aay" (Nagpanchami)

== Zee Cine Awards ==
- 2002 - Nominated—Zee Cine Award for Best Playback Singer - Female - "Raat Ka Nasha Abhi" - Asoka
- 2004 - Nominated—Zee Cine Award for Best Playback Singer - Female - "Kasam Ki Kasam" - Main Prem Ki Diwani Hoon

== Global Indian Music Academy Awards (GIMA) ==
- 2013 – Best Carnatic Classical Album - Vocal - Album "Vande Vasudevam" an album based on Annamacharya Krithis.

== MTV Video Music Award ==
- 2001 – International Viewer's Choice Awards MTV India (Hindi pop category) Album Piya Basanti.(The first singer from South India to get the MTV Award)

== Star Screen Awards ==
- 1996 - Best Female Playback - "For various South Indian languages"
- 1997 - Best Female Playback - "For various South Indian languages"
- 1998 – Best Female Playback – "Payale Chummun" (Virasat)
- 2002 - Nominated—Best Female Playback - "Pyaar Tune Kya Kiya" - Pyaar Tune Kya Kiya

== MTV Immies Awards ==
- 2003 - Best Play Back Singer - "Koi Mil Gaya" (Koi... Mil Gaya)

== Producers Guild Film Awards ==
- 2004 - Nominated—Producers Guild Film Award for Best Female Playback Singer - "Koi Mil Gaya" (Koi... Mil Gaya)

== South Indian International Movie Awards ==
- 2014 – Best Female Playback Singer – Telugu – ''Seethamma Vakitlo'' (Seethamma Vakitlo Sirimalle Chettu)
- 2015 – Nominated – Best Female Playback Singer – Telugu – "Gopikamma" (Mukunda)
- 2017 – Best Female Playback Singer – Tamil – "Konji Pesida Venaam" (Sethupathi)
- 2017 – Best Female Playback Singer – Malayalam – "Kaadaniyum Kalchilambe" (Pulimurugan)
- 2018 – Best Female Playback Singer – Malayalam – "Nadaavathil" (Kamboji)
- 2022 – Nominated – Best Female Playback Singer – Malayalam – "Theerame" (Malik)
- 2023 – Nominated – Best Female Playback Singer – Telugu – "Antha Ishtam" (Bheemla Nayak)

== Gulf Malayalam Music Awards (GMMA) ==
- 2005 - Best Female Playback Singer
- 2006 - Best Female Playback Singer
- 2008 - Best Female Playback Singer

== Reporter TV Film Awards ==
- 2022 – Best Female Playback Singer – "Theerame Theerame" Malik)

== Kerala Film Critics Association Awards ==
- 1984 - Best Female Playback Singer – Nokkethadoorathu Kannumnattu
- 1985 - Best Female Playback Singer – Various films
- 1986 - Best Female Playback Singer – Shyama, Thalavattam, Nakhashathangal
- 1987 - Best Female Playback Singer – Idanazhiyil oru kaalocha, Manivathoorile ayiram shivarathrikal
- 1994 - Best Female Playback Singer – Various Films
- 2016 – Best Female Playback Singer – "Ormakalil Oru Manjukaalam" "Mallanum Mathevanum"
- 2020 - Best Female Playback Singer – "Perfume"

== Asiavision Awards ==
- 2013 – Best Female Playback - "Ilaveyil Viralukalayi" (Artist)
- 2015 – Best Female Playback Tamil- "Malargal Kaettaen" (OK Kanmani) .
- 2016 – Best Female Playback - "Kaadaniyum Kalchilambe..." (Pulimurugan) and "Poovithalai..." (Thoppil Joppan)

== Mazhavil Mango Music Awards ==
- 2017 – Best Duet Song - "Kaadaniyum Kalchilambe" (Pulimurugan) - Malayalam shared with K.J. Yesudas
- 2018 – Best Playback Singer (Female) - "Mridhu Mandahasam" (Poomaram) - Malayalam

== Other honours ==
- 1994 – Ugadi Purashkar by Madras Telugu Academy, Chennai
- 2002 – Title of "KALAISELVAM" From South Indian Film Artistes' Association or South Indian Nadigar Sangam
- 2012 – "People of the Year" Honoured by Limca Book of Records
- 2013 – Special Honour for contribution to Malayalam Film Industry 100 years Indian Cinema Celebration at Chennai.
- 2014 – Lifetime Achievement Award from Raindropss a youth-based social organization on the occasion of Women's Day
- 2014 – Felicitated by Limca Book of Records for "Empowering Women - Women Achievers of Kerala"
- 2014 – Vayalar Award by Vayalar Ramavarma Memorial Foundation for contribution of Malayalam Music Industry
- 2015 – Felicitated by The Supreme Head of Malankara Orthodox Syrian Church Baselios Mar Thoma Paulose II at "SOMRO"15
- 2015 – Felicitated Thottuvaa "Dhanwanthari Puraskaram" by Justice Raman (Tranvancore Devaswom Ombudsman).
- 2016 – Angamaly NRI Association (ANRIA) "Swararathna Puraskaram" as lifetime achievement award for her outstanding performance and creative contributions in the field of music spanning last 36 years.

== Other awards ==
- Cinema Express Awards for 1986, 1987, 1988,1990,1991,1993,1994,1995,1998. She won it for 9 times
- Film Fans Association Chennai Award – 20 times (This is the oldest film award in South India)
- Gamma Indian Music Award, Malaysia for 1988,1989,1990,1996. Won it for 4 times
- 2001 – "For the sake of honour" award from Rotary International
- 2001 – Lux – Asianet Award for the best playback singer Kannada
- 2004 – "Vocational excellence" award from Rotary International
- 2005 – VIRTUSO Music Awards 2005
- 2006 – Lux – Asianet Award for the best playback singer Kannada
- 2008 – Devasthanam Award for GANAPRIYA Puraskaram by Peringottukara Devasthanam Temple Trust
- 2012 – Thikkurissy Award for Best Female Playback Singer – "Naattuvazhiyorathe" (Khaddama)
- 2013 – ETV Kannada Sangeet Samman (P. B. Sreenivas) Award
- 2013 – CERA BIG Malayalam Music Awards for Best Female Playback - "Ilaveyil Viralukalayi" (Artist) and "Ponnodu Poovay" (Thalsamayam Oru Penkutty)
- 2013 – CERA Big Malayalam Music Awards for Face of the Award - Honoured for completing three decades in the industry
- 2014 – Minimol Memorial Charitable Trust - Sathkeerthi Puraskaram
- 2014 – Mappila Kala Academy in memory of K Raghavan Master - Sangeetha Ratnam Puraskaram for her contribution to film industry
- 2014 – K.P. Radhakrishna Menon memorial Kala Ratna Award for her outstanding contributions to music.
- 2015 – K.P.S Menon Memorial Award 2015 by Chettoor Sankaran Nair Memorial Trust, Ottapalam.
- 2015 – Harmony International Award 2015 instituted by Marthoma Research Academy, Azhikode, Kodungallur.

=== Other achievements ===
- She has also received numerous mainstream awards like MTV Immies, Screen – Videocon Award, Film Fans Association Awards, and Cinema Express Awards. Chithra was also awarded the 'Vocational Excellence' Award by the Rotary Club of Coimbatore.
- Her song "Kannalane (Kehna Hi Kya)" from the film Bombay (1995) was included in The Guardian's "1000 Songs Everyone Must Hear" list.
