= Invest Bank P.S.C. =

Emirati commercial bank based in Sharjah

- Type: Public shareholding company (P.S.C.)
- Traded as: ADX: INB
- Industry: Banking, financial services
- Founded: February 1975, 13; 51 years ago in Sharjah, United Arab Emirates
- Headquarters: Al Zahra Street, Sharjah, United Arab Emirates
- Number of locations: 4 branches (United Arab Emirates)
- Key people: Sheikh Sultan bin Ahmed Al Qasimi (chairman); Edris Mohammad Al Rafi (CEO)
- Net income: ▲AED 161.5 million (2025)
- Total assets: AED 14.16 billion (2025)
- Owner: Government of Sharjah (70.06%); Sharjah Social Security Fund (18.04%)
- Number of employees: 296 (2024)
- Subsidiaries: Sharjah Expo Hotel L.L.C. Gulf Real Estate Structured Equity I, Ltd Ruba Real Estate L.L.C.
- Website: www.investbank.ae

Invest Bank P.S.C. (also branded INB) is a commercial bank headquartered in Sharjah, United Arab Emirates. The bank is licensed and regulated by the Central Bank of the United Arab Emirates (CBUAE) and its shares are listed on the Abu Dhabi Securities Exchange (ADX) under the symbol INB. The Government of Sharjah has been the bank's controlling shareholder since 2019 and held 70.06% of its share capital as of December 2024.

== Overview ==
Invest Bank operates through two main business segments: commercial banking, and investment and treasury banking. Its commercial banking activities include loans, credit facilities, deposits and current accounts for corporate, institutional and individual customers. The bank serves customers through four branches: two in Sharjah, one in Dubai and one in Abu Dhabi.

As of December 2024, the Government of Sharjah held 70.06% of Invest Bank's share capital, the Sharjah Social Security Fund held 18.04%, and other shareholders held 11.9%.

== History ==
Invest Bank was incorporated in 1975 as a public shareholding company in the Emirate of Sharjah. The company was initially focused on corporate banking and later expanded into retail banking services.

According to the bank's own account of its history, its shareholding became wholly locally owned in 1993, when management control passed from Bank Audi to local management, and it took the name Invest Bank in 1997. Dr Abdullah Omran Taryam chaired the board from 1995 until his death in 2014, and was succeeded by Omran Abdulla Omran Taryam, who served as chairman until 2019. The shares were listed on the Abu Dhabi Securities Exchange on 27 March 2005.

In December 2018, following a period of heavy losses on its real estate and construction exposures, the CBUAE stated that it would support Invest Bank with liquidity facilities while the bank sought new capital. In April 2019, shareholders approved a strategic investment by the Government of Sharjah of AED 1.115 billion in exchange for a 50.07% stake, together with a reorganisation of the board that included the appointment of Sheikh Sultan bin Ahmed Al Qasimi as chairman. On 12 October 2023 the government increased its holding to 88.11% through a rights issue.

In September 2024, Edris Mohammad Al Rafi, previously vice chairman and a board member since 2022, was appointed chief executive officer. On 30 December 2024, the Government of Sharjah transferred 47.49 billion shares, representing 20.48% of the bank's capital, to the Sharjah Social Security Fund in an off-market transaction on the ADX. Following the transfer, the government held 70.06% and the fund 18.04%, with other shareholders holding 11.9%.

In March 2025, Invest Bank received first place in the financial oversight category at the inaugural Tamayuz Institutional Excellence Award in Sharjah.

In October 2025, the bank received approval from the CBUAE to operate an Islamic banking window, allowing it to offer Sharia-compliant products and services.

In February 2026, the bank launched a new corporate identity at an event attended by Sheikh Sultan bin Ahmed Al Qasimi, Deputy Ruler of Sharjah and chairman of the bank, and resumed trading of its shares on the ADX on 24 February 2026.

== International operations ==
Invest Bank was licensed in 2012 to open a branch in Beirut, Lebanon, and the branch, located in the Ain El Mreisseh district, began operating in 2014. Following the Lebanese financial crisis, the bank decided to wind down the operation in 2024.

As part of its restructuring, the bank reduced its domestic branch network. At the end of 2020, it operated five branches in the United Arab Emirates: Al Qasimia, which also served as its head office, and Halwan in Sharjah; Independence and Al Ain in Abu Dhabi; and Sheikh Zayed Road in Dubai. It also operated a branch in Beirut. During 2020, the bank closed three UAE branches, located in Fujairah, Musaffah and the Sharjah Airport International Free Zone. By 2024, its UAE network consisted of four branches: Al Qasimia and City Centre Al Zahia in Sharjah, Sheikh Zayed Road in Dubai, and Independence in Abu Dhabi.

== Financial performance ==
The bank reported its first annual net loss in 2017, after more than four decades of profitability, following a downturn in the UAE construction and real estate sectors to which a significant portion of its loan book was exposed.

In December 2018, the CBUAE stated that it would support Invest Bank with liquidity facilities while the bank sought new capital, after the bank was affected by high levels of non-performing loans linked to its exposure to the real estate and construction market. The central bank required Invest Bank to book provisions of AED 2.199 billion, an amount that would have exceeded the bank's equity of AED 2.154 billion at the time. Barclays advised Invest Bank on the fundraising, while HSBC advised the Government of Sharjah.

In April 2019, shareholders approved a strategic investment by the Government of Sharjah of AED 1.115 billion in exchange for a 50.07% stake, together with a reorganisation of the board of directors that included the appointment of Sheikh Sultan bin Ahmed Al Qasimi as chairman. The government committed to invest a total of up to AED 1.9 billion through a two-stage process, including the underwriting of a subsequent rights issue of AED 785 million.

The bank continued to report losses in the years following the recapitalisation, recording accumulated losses of AED 1.75 billion at the end of 2020, which it attributed to legacy non-performing loans. In 2021, following the departure of chief executive Lloyd Maddock, the bank adopted a dual-CEO structure, appointing Mohammed Alelaiq as CEO for support and special assets and Safdar Mandviwala as CEO for business and strategy.

In 2023, the Government of Sharjah increased bank's shareholding through a rights issue. The same year, the bank entered into a guarantee agreement with the Government of Sharjah under which the government agreed to guarantee the bank against losses of up to AED 3 billion in the net book value of specified financial and non-financial assets.

Invest Bank returned to profitability in 2025, reporting a net profit after tax of AED 161.5 million, compared with a net loss of AED 189.3 million in 2024. Total operating income increased to AED 434.7 million from AED 211.4 million, total assets rose 28% to AED 14.16 billion, and customer deposits grew 30% to AED 11.33 billion. The bank's capital adequacy ratio stood at 20.2%. Accumulated losses declined to AED 1.55 billion, equivalent to 48.57% of paid-up capital, from AED 1.70 billion a year earlier.

On 20 July 2026, Fitch Ratings assigned Invest Bank its first Long-Term Issuer Default Rating, at BBB+ with a stable outlook, and a Government Support Rating of bbb+. Fitch cited the bank's expected government support, adequate capitalisation and improving financial metrics, while noting its relatively small domestic franchise.

For the first quarter of 2026, the bank reported profit before tax of AED22.4 million, an increase of 97% year on year. For the first half of the year, it reported profit before tax of AED80.5 million, up 61% year on year. At the end of the first half of 2026, total assets were AED16.1 billion, customer deposits AED13.3 billion, net loans AED8.8 billion and net interest margin 2.2%.

== Digital transformation ==
Since 2024, Invest Bank has pursued a digital transformation strategy focused on technology and digital infrastructure, customer experience, talent and organisational culture, data and analytics, and partnerships with financial technology companies. In February 2025, the bank appointed a head of digital as part of changes to its senior management structure.

During 2024, the bank implemented the Temenos core banking system using a software-as-a-service cloud model, along with the APPRO digital origination and onboarding platform for credit cards and retail products, the Bluering credit lifecycle management system, and Moody's CreditLens credit analysis platform. It also implemented an enterprise content management, workflow and electronic signature system as part of its paperless-office programme. In August 2024, Invest Bank entered into a partnership with Network International to expand digital payment services for corporate customers. In February 2025, it contracted Veefin Solutions to digitise its supply chain finance operations.

=== Mobile banking ===
Invest Bank launched its Invest Bank UAE mobile banking application in October 2025. The application provides account and balance information, domestic and international transfers, bill payments, fixed-deposit opening, card management functions including card freezing and PIN reset, electronic statements, a branch locator and support for Apple Pay. It is available for iOS and Android devices. The bank also provides internet banking services to retail and corporate customers.

== Corporate social responsibility ==
Invest Bank participated in career fairs in Sharjah aimed at recruiting UAE nationals as part of an Emiratisation programme.

In 2023, Invest Bank signed a memorandum of understanding with the University of Sharjah covering student internships, joint workshops and seminars, mentorship for student start-ups and annual competitions.

In 2024, the bank reported providing 18,000 Iftar meals during Ramadan in partnership with Sharjah Municipality and making a donation to Sharjah City for Humanitarian Services. It also sponsored the investors' lounge at the Sharjah Investment Forum and the 43rd Sharjah International Book Fair, and participated in the Tanweer Festival. The bank also entered into a partnership with UN Women concerning gender equality and women's empowerment.

For the year ended 31 December 2025, Invest Bank reported social contributions of AED 4.03 million.

As of October 2024, Invest Bank provided AED 240 million in financing to green sectors, while also using LED lighting, environmentally friendly paper, and electronic internal communications to reduce paper consumption. The bank reduced the use of paper-based processes to support the United Arab Emirates’ Net Zero 2050 objectives.
