= Sharjah Directorate of Public Works =

Department of Public Works
- دائرة الأشغال العامة بالشارقة

Department overview
- Formed: 2000
- Jurisdiction: Emirate of Sharjah
- Department executive: Ali Bin Shaheen Al Suwaidi, Chief
- Website: dpw.sharjah.ae

The Sharjah Department of Public Works is an agency of the Government of Sharjah

Department of Public Works was founded under the princely Decree No. (9) 2000, issued by His Highness Sheikh Dr. Sultan Bin Mohammed Al Qassimi, Member of Supreme Council, Ruler of Sharjah, on April 8, 2000. DPW is a legally, financially and administratively independent entity with full capacity to act. In addition to the headquarter located in Sharjah city, DPW has other four branches in Al Dhaid, Kalbaa, Khor fakkan and Diba Al Hisn.

Directorate of Public Works, representing Sharjah government, is responsible for implementing civil construction and infrastructure project, in order to cope with the comprehensive social and economic plans approved by His Highness, Ruler of Sharjah or by the Executive Council.
