= Ayesha Takia =

Indian former actress (born 1986)

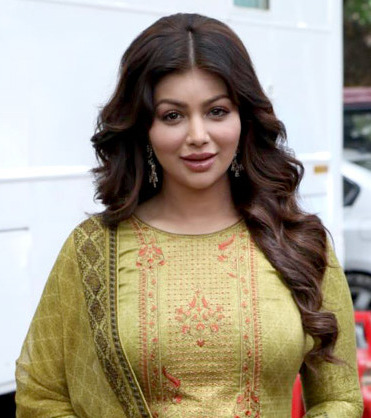
- Takia in 2018
- Born: 10 April 1986 (age 40); Mumbai, Maharashtra, India
- Other name: Ayesha Takia Azmi
- Occupation: Former actress
- Years active: 2000–2012
- Spouse: Farhan Azmi (m. 2009)
- Children: 1
- Relatives: Abu Azmi (father-in-law)

Ayesha Takia Azmi (née Takia; born 10 April 1986) is an Indian former actress who worked mainly in Hindi films. After appearing in advertisements and music video, she made her film debut in the action film action thriller Taarzan: The Wonder Car, earning the Filmfare Award for Best Female Debut. Takia gain recognition with roles in Super (2005), Socha Na Tha (2005) and Dor (2006), winning Screen Award for Best Actress – Critics. She subsequently appeared in a number of commercially unsuccessful films before starring in Wanted (2009), her highest-grossing release. Following appearances in films such as Paathshaala (2010), Salaam-e-Ishq (2007), Mod (2011), she retired from acting.

Outside her film career, Takia has supported animal-welfare and wildlife-conservation causes. In 2012, she appeared as a talent anchor on the musical reality show Sur Kshetra (2012). She is married to businessman Farhan Azmi, with whom she has a son.

== Early life and background ==
Takia was born in Mumbai on 10 April 1986, in Bombay (now known as Mumbai), Maharashtra, India. Takia was brought up in a mixed cultural environment, as her father Nishit Takia, a restaurateur, is of Gujarati descent, while her mother, Faridah, has British (Anglo-Indian) and Marathi ancestry. She has a younger sister Natasha. Takia attended St Anthony's Girls High School, Chembur.

== Career ==
=== Modelling career and debut (2000–2005) ===
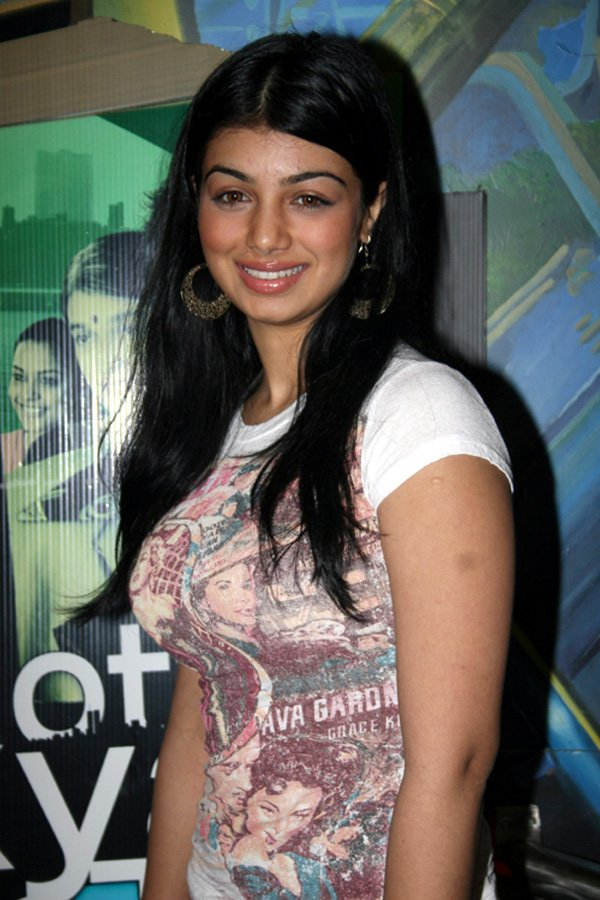
Takia at an event in 2006

Before beginning her career in film, Takia appeared in television commercials. She began modelling at the age of 15, appearing with Shahid Kapoor in the I am a Complan Boy! I'm a Complan Girl! advertising campaign. Her first public appearance was in the music video for Falguni Pathak's song "Meri Chunar Udd Udd Jaye". Later, she appeared in the music video of "Shake It Daddy", a remix of the song "Nahin Nahin Abhi Nahin" along with actor Keith Sequeira. Both the songs were directed by Vinay Sapru and Radhika Rao, which brought her to the attention of Bollywood, leading to film offers.

In 2004, Takia made her acting debut in Abbas–Mustan's supernatural action thriller film Taarzan: The Wonder Car alongside debutante Vatsal Sheth. Loosely based on comedy drama Christine (1983), the film did not achieve financial success. However, she has been praised for her glamorous appearance in the film. The BBC wrote, "Gorgeous Ayesha Takia does not have a meaty role to play but displays herself as a confident actress". Takia's portrayal earned her Filmfare Best Female Debut Award (2005) and IIFA Award for Star Debut of the Year – Female (2005). Takia next starred alongside Shahid Kapoor in the multi-starrer romantic comedy Dil Maange More (2004). Takia's role as a dominant, combative girl named Shagun Shah earned her two nominations viz. Screen Award for Most Promising Newcomer – Female and Zee Cine Award for Best Female Debut. The film underperformed at the box office, grossing only ₹7.87 crore (US$820,000) across India.

In 2005, Takia starred in three films. Her first release of the year was writer-director Imtiaz Ali's romantic comedy Socha Na Tha. Besides being Imtiaz Ali's first film as a director, Socha Na Tha also marked Abhay Deol's acting debut. Upon release it received positive reviews from critics. Patcy N for Rediff.com wrote, "Ayesha Takia is a sweet, energetic actress, but her role does not require too much acting skill". Jaspreet Pandohar for the BBC mentioned, "Dashing newcomers look great together on screen and give sweet, fun performances as a young couple who love making things complicated. Ali’s writing and directing also keep the story interesting and enjoyable". However, the movie underperformed at the box-office, with total earnings of ₹3.43 crore (US$360,000) across India. Takia next co-starred David Dhawan's multi-starrer comedy Shaadi No. 1, opposite Fardeen Khan. The film which illustrates the story of three couples featured an ensemble cast (Sanjay Dutt, Fardeen Khan, Zayed Khan, Sharman Joshi, Esha Deol, and Soha Ali Khan). The film received a mixed response from critics, and did not perform well at the box office. Made on a budget of ₹5 crore (US$520,000), it earned around ₹12 crore (US$1.2 million) worldwide. She then appeared in Sujoy Ghosh's comedy-drama Home Delivery, which was also her last release of 2004. The film received negative reviews, with criticism aimed at the unoriginal plot and humour, and underperformed at the box office. Nonetheless, Takia was praised for her role. India Today noted that Takia's role was one of the key attractions of the film.

Takia made her debut in South Indian cinema in 2005, in the Telugu-language action heist Super alongside Nagarjuna Akkineni. Though the film was financially successful, it received mixed critical reviews. B. Anuradha for Rediff wrote, "Ayesha debuts in Telugu films with a glamorous role". Her performance as a doctor named Siri Valli earned her first Filmfare Award for Best Actress – Telugu nomination at 53rd Filmfare Awards South. The film was later dubbed into Hindi and released under the title Robbery.

=== Career downturn and sabbaticals (2006–2012) ===
In 2006, Takia appeared in Satish Kaushik's comedy Shaadi Se Pehle, loosely influenced by an old Hindi movie, Meri Biwi Ki Shaadi. Rediff gave the film a negative review. The film was a box office flop, grossing ₹16.89 crore (US$1.8 million) worldwide. Rajeev Masand remarked that, Ayesha Takia had 'precious little to do,' calling it a pity given her natural spontaneity as an actress. She next played the protagonist in Naseeruddin Shah-directed drama Yun Hota Toh Kya Hota (2006), co-starring alongside an ensemble cast. Set in the United States, the film follows the story of a group of individuals who become interwind with 9/11. Made on a budget of ₹6.25 crore (US$650,000), the film earned only ₹1.75 crore (US$180,000) crores at the box office, and was declared a disaster by Box Office India. The film received mixed reviews from the critics. Writing for BBC Poonam Joshi noted, "Yun Hota Toh Kya Hota, is perhaps a combination of the subtlety in the storytelling, which refrains from sensationalism, and the pathos of the very subject matter that renders this film an emotional experience". Rediff wrote, "The film is an impressively ambitious one, trying to weave four complex stories running parallel to one another, their paths fatefully criss-crossing only near the very end. But, despite the obvious effort and solid performances, the film severely lacks finesse." Later in the same year, Takia played the part of a Rajasthani Hindu woman in Nagesh Kukunoor's smaller-budget drama Dor. The film also features Gul Panag and Shreyas Talpade as the lead actors. An official adaptation of the Malayalam film, Perumazhakkalam (2004), the film tells a story of a widow. The film did not perform well commercially, collecting only ₹2.7 crore (US$280,000) at the box office. The Times of India said, "Apart from the unusual plot, it is Ayesha Takia who simply blows your breath away". While, Merril Diniz noted, "Ayesha goes for the kill with an award-winning performance. Happy and content one minute, depressed, vengeful or naive the next, she does justice to all the various shades of Meera's spirited yet repressed character." Her performance as a young widowed Rajasthani woman living in a traditional joint family went on to win several accolades, including the Zee Cine Award for Best Actress – Critics.

In 2007, Takia appeared in seven films, the first being Nikkhil Advani's romantic drama Salaam-e-Ishq, opposite Akshaye Khanna. The film generated mixed to negative reviews from critics, and its eventual box-office profit was poor. Sukanya Verma opined that she "infuses perky enthusiasm to an otherwise run-of-the-mill part". Takia's next film role was alongside Tusshar Kapoor in Kya Love Story Hai. The critical reaction to the film and Takia's portrayal of a young girl was negative. Khalid Mohamed of Hindustan Times observed: "The film bombards you with clichés, lackluster performances, and two comedians who seem entirely devoid of talent." Although the film was produced on a budget of ₹7.25 crore (US$750,000), it only managed to earn ₹4 crore (US$420,000) at the box office, resulting in a commercial failure in India. Co-starring alongside Shahid Kapoor, Ahmed Khan's multi-starer comedy caper film Fool & Final was her next release. The film with an ensemble cast met with mixed critical reviews. Taran Adarsh from Bollywood Hungama commented, "Ayesha Takia pairs off well with Shahid, but doesn't have much to do really". In the same year, Takia appeared in the action thriller film Cash. Directed by Anubhav Sinha, the movie generated mostly negative reviews and emerged as a commercial failure. Takia played the lead role in Vishal Bhardwaj's short film Blood Brothers. With a run time of 13 minutes, the film depicted the story of a young man who, after finding out that he is HIV positive, allows his life to fall apart. It premiered at the Toronto International Film Festival.

Her final release of the year 2007 was the psychological thriller No Smoking, opposite John Abraham. Based upon the 1978 short story "Quitters, Inc." by Stephen King, it was directed by Anurag Kashyap. The film tells a story of a narcissistic and self-obsessed chain-smoker who gets trapped in the rehabilitation programme of a person who guarantees he will make him quit smoking. Takia played the twin role of the protagonist's wife and secretary, Anjali and Annie respectively. Released on 26 October 2007, the film received negative reviews from critics and audiences. Shubhra Gupta for Indian Express commented, "No Smoking is no good. Not because it doesn't have a superb idea. It does. But because it is too bizarre, too outré, too out of it. It stops us from connecting". The film performed poorly at the box office and was declared a 'disaster' by Box Office India. However, the film would later go on to gain a cult following due to its surrealist mix of fantasy, horror, and dark humor.

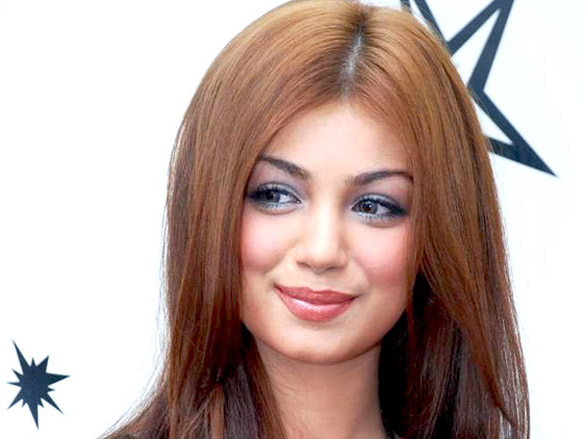
Takia promoting Wanted in 2009

In 2008, Takia co-starred in Rohit Shetty's directed mystery comedy Sunday. The film received mixed critical reviews and underperformed at the box office. She then starred in comedy De Taali. The film did not perform well at the box office and earned poor critical reviews.

Takia had two major releases in 2009: action thriller 8 x 10 Tasveer opposite Akshay Kumar and Prabhu Deva's Wanted co-starring Salman Khan. 8 x 10 Tasveer performed poorly at the box office. The film stars Takia as Sheila, the fiancé of Akshaye's character. Critical response towards Takia's performance received moderate reviews: Rajeev Masand stated, "Ayesha plays the role of Jai's (Akshay) fiancé and it doesn't leave much of an impression". Taran Adarsh for Bollywood Hungama called Takia "natural". The Times of India noted, "There's nothing really to cheer you up in the desultory proceedings, unless you want to watch chubby-cheeked Ayesha". Although Wanted received mixed reviews from most critics, it went on to become one of the highest-grossing films of the year and marked the biggest commercial success of Takia's career. Takia's role as Jahnvi, met with positive reviews. Rediff commented, "Ayesha Takia is given a truly raw deal. She's given a role that can only be described as insufficient".

In 2010, Takia starred in the drama Paathshaala, alongside Shahid Kapoor. Inspired by the Marathi film Shaala, it generated mixed reviews. Her last release of the year was Mod, which met with a poor response. In 2012, Takia hosted the musical-reality show Sur Kshetra, her only season as the program's host.

== Personal life ==
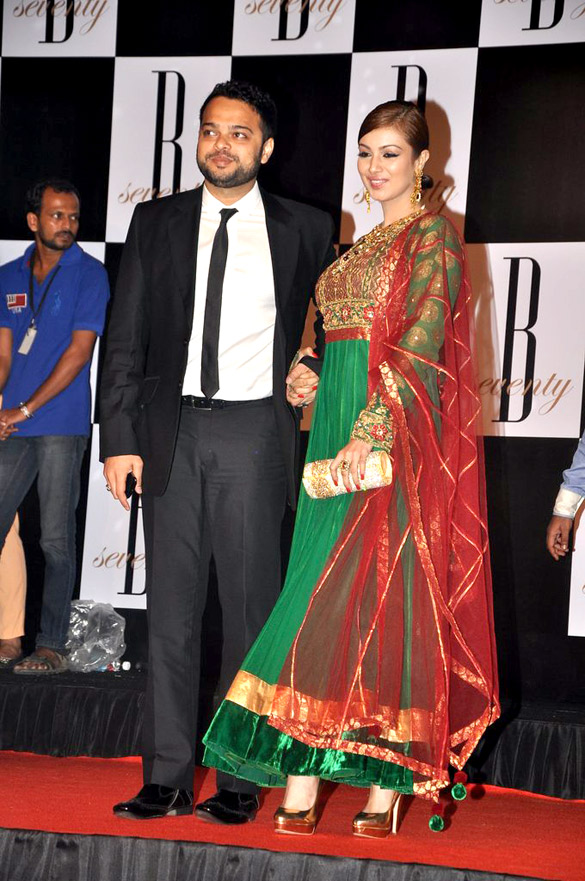
Takia with husband Farhan Azmi in 2012, at Amitabh Bachchan's 70th birthday party

On 1 March 2009, Takia married restaurateur Farhan Azmi. The couple has a son, Mikail, who was born in December 2013. Takia is active on social media, particularly on Twitter, where she has voiced support for wildlife protection. In a public statement, she stated she is a vegan while posing for a vegan ad for PETA India.

== Filmography ==
=== Films ===
- Note: All films are in the Hindi language unless specifically mentioned otherwise.

Year	Title	Role	Notes	Ref(s)
2004	Taarzan: The Wonder Car	Priya Kapoor		
2004	Dil Maange More	Shagun Shah		
2005	Socha Na Tha	Aditi Sahani		
2005	Shaadi No. 1	Bhavna Mittal		
2005	Super	Sirvalli "Siri"	Telugu film	
2005	Home Delivery	Jenny		
2006	Shaadi Se Pehle	Rani		
2006	Yun Hota Toh Kya Hota	Khushboo Modi		
2006	Dor	Meera		
2007	Salaam-E-Ishq	Gia Bakshi		
2007	Kya Love Story Hai	Kajal Mehra		
2007	Fool N Final	Tina Saluja		
2007	Cash	Preeti / Riya		
2007	Blood Brothers	Keya	Short film	
2007	No Smoking	Anjali / Annie		
2008	Sunday	Sehar Thapar		
2008	De Taali	Amrita "Amu"		
2009	8 x 10 Tasveer	Sheila Patel		
2009	Wanted	Jahnvi Verma		
2010	Paathshaala	Anjali Mathur		
2011	Mod	Ananya Mahadeo		

=== Television ===
Year	Title	Role	Ref(s)
2012	Sur Kshetra	Host	

== Awards and nominations ==
Year	Award	Category	Work	Result	Ref.
2005	Filmfare Awards	Best Female Debut	Taarzan: The Wonder Car	Won	
2005	IIFA Awards	IIFA Award for Star Debut of the Year – Female	Taarzan: The Wonder Car	Won	
2005	Screen Awards	Screen Award for Most Promising Newcomer – Female	Taarzan: The Wonder Car	Nominated	
2005	Zee Cine Awards	Zee Cine Award for Best Female Debut	Taarzan: The Wonder Car	Nominated	
2006	Filmfare Awards	Filmfare Award for Best Telugu Actress	Super	Nominated	
2007	Screen Awards	Screen Award for Best Actress (Critics)	Dor	Won	
2007	Zee Cine Awards	Zee Cine Award – Critics' Choice Best Actress	Dor	Won	
2007	Bengal Film Journalists' Association	Bengal Film Journalists' Association - Best Actress Award	Dor	Won	

== See also ==
- Filmfare Award for Best Female Debut
- List of Indian film actresses
- List of Hindi film actresses
