= K. S. Chithra =

Indian playback singer

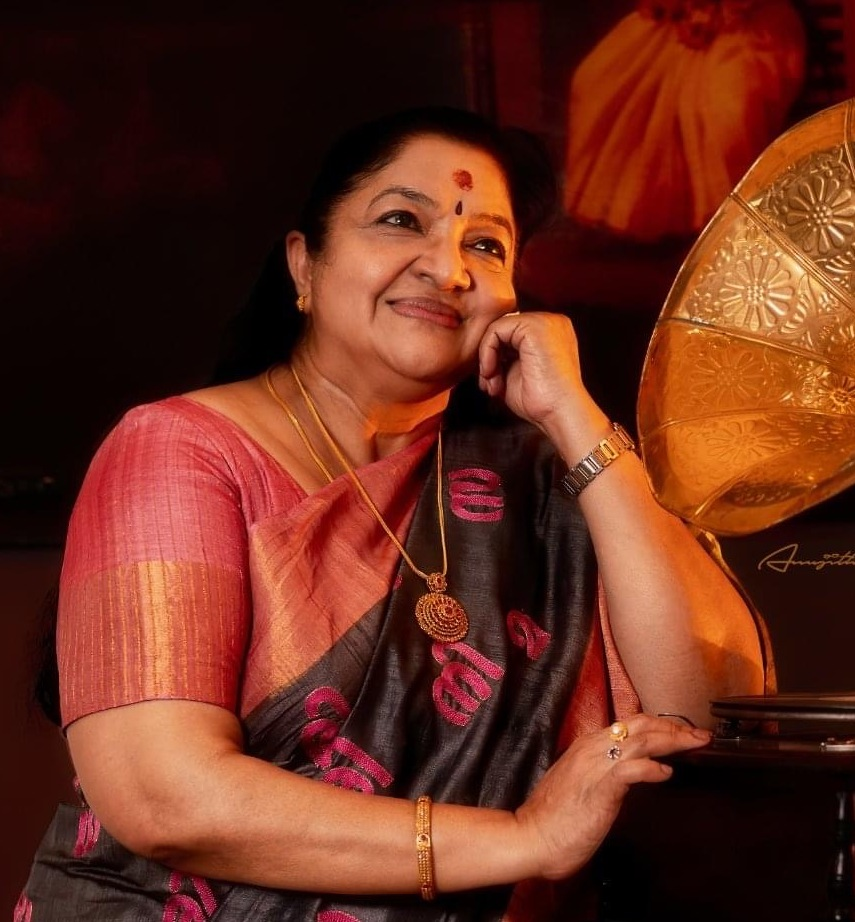
- Chithra in 2022
- Born: Krishnan Nair Shantakumari Chithra; 27 July 1963 (age 63); Trivandrum, Kerala, India
- Education: University of Kerala
- Occupations: Singer; music producer; Judge
- Years active: 1979–present
- Spouse: Vijayashankar (m. 1987)
- Children: 1
- Honours: See list
- Musical career
- Genres: Indian classical music; Playback singing; Filmi
- Instrument: Vocals
- Label: Audiotracs
- Website: kschithra.com

Krishnan Nair Shantakumari Chithra (born 27 July 1963) is an Indian playback singer and Carnatic musician. In a career spanning around five decades, she has recorded over 25,000 songs in various Indian languages such as Tamil, Kannada, Hindi, Telugu, Malayalam, Odia, Bengali, Punjabi, Rajasthani, Awadhi, Marathi, Tulu, Badaga, Braj, Banjara, Urdu, Assamese, Gujarati, Manipuri and Sanskrit, as well as foreign languages such as Malay, Latin, Arabic, Sinhalese, English and French.

The Royal Albert Hall, London, has recognised her with the honorific title the Golden Voice of India. The Times Group honoured her as the Melody Queen of Indian Cinema in 2016, reflecting her contribution to the industry. She is also celebrated as the Little Nightingale of Indian Cinema, Nightingale of South India, and in different regions, she is known by various affectionate titles: Piya Basanti in North India, Vanambadi in Kerala, Chinna Kuyil in Tamil Nadu, Kannada Kogile in Karnataka and Sangeeta Saraswathi in Andhra Pradesh and Telangana states. She is also known for her history of collaboration with music composers like A. R. Rahman, Ilaiyaraja, M. M. Keeravani, Hamsalekha, and with the playback singers K. J. Yesudas and S. P. Balasubrahmanyam over the years.

Chithra is a recipient of 6 National Film Awards, 10 Filmfare Awards South and 43 State Government awards from 8 states of India including 18 from Kerala, 12 from Andhra Pradesh, 5 from Tamil Nadu, 4 from Karnataka, and 1 each from Odisha, West Bengal, Madhya Pradesh and Maharashtra governments. She was awarded India's third-highest civilian honours Padma Bhushan in 2021 and Padma Shri in 2005 for her valuable contributions towards the Indian musical fraternity.

She is honoured with the title First Ladies by the President of India in 2018 for being the first Indian woman to be honoured by British Parliament at House of Commons, United Kingdom in 2003. In 2009, she became the first Indian artist to be honoured by Government of China while performing live at the Qinghai International river festival. On 20 March 2025, She was formally honoured by the Parliament of South Australia in recognition of her outstanding contributions to Indian music. She was honoured by the Texas House of Representatives, Government of Texas, United States of America, for her lasting contributions to music and the arts. She was honoured in the United States with a Joint Legislative Resolution from the State of New Jersey and a Mayoral Proclamation from the Township of Edison for her outstanding contributions to music and philanthropy. On 19 October 2025, the K. S. Chithra Day was proclaimed by the Shelby County Government in Memphis, Tennessee via a mayoral proclamation from the Office of the Mayor. She was honoured by the Government of Sharjah, United Arab Emirates, with a Lifetime Achievement Award in recognition of her distinguished contributions to Indian music and her five-decade-long career.

== Early life ==
Chithra was born 27 July 1963 in the city of Trivandrum (now Thiruvananthapuram) of the Kerala state. Her father, Krishnan Nair was a school teacher and a music enthusiast who taught basics of music to all his three children. He died after a long battle with cancer on 18 July 1986. Her mother Shanthakumari was also a music teacher. She has an elder sister, K. S. Beena who is a former singer and younger brother K. S. Mahesh who is a musician. Chithra completed her schooling at the Cotton Hill Government Girls High School in Thiruvananthapuram. She acknowledges that it was the teachers of the school who spotted her talent in music.

Chithra received her training in Carnatic music from K. Omanakutty for seven years. She graduated in B.A. in music with first class and third rank from the University of Kerala. She was selected for the National Talent Search Scholarship from the Government of India during the period 1978 - 1984.

== Playback singing ==
=== Malayalam cinema ===
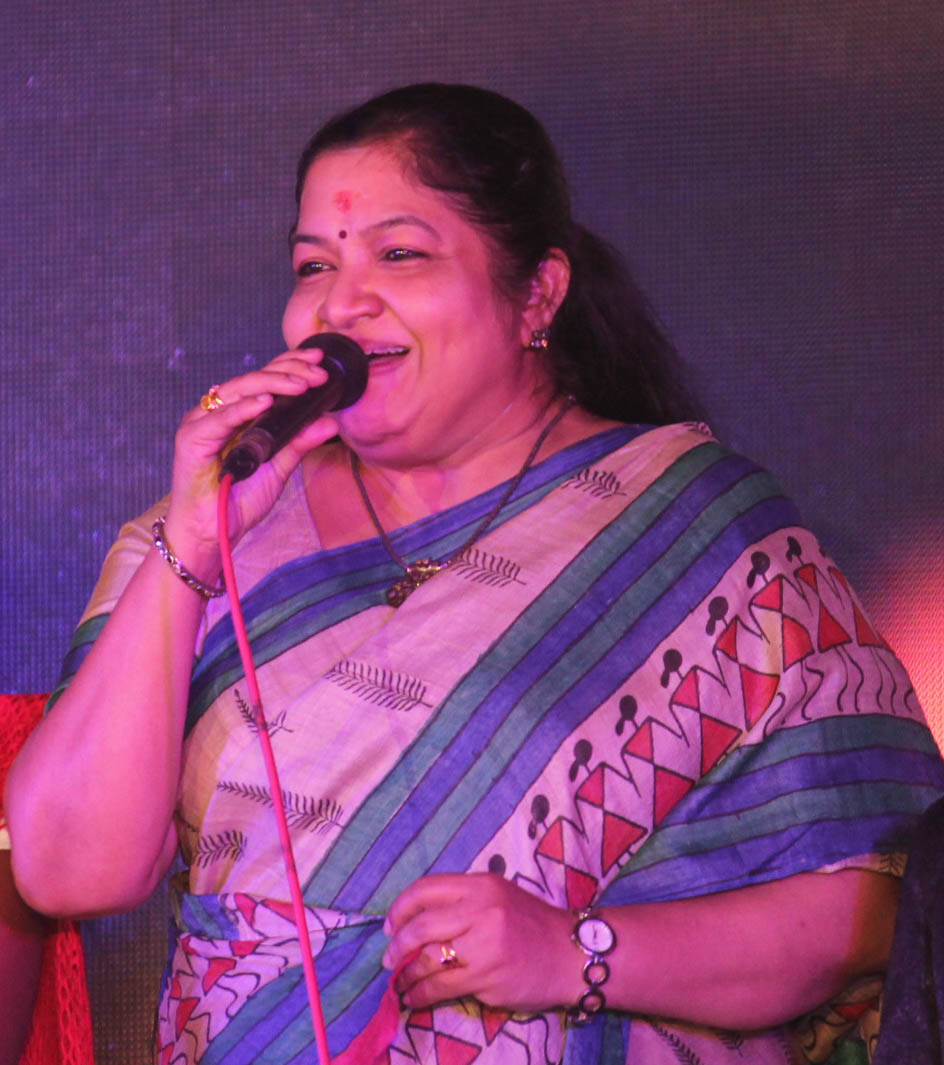
Chithra performing at a concert in 2015

==== 1979–1989: Early recordings and recognition ====
Chithra began recording for Malayalam cinema in 1979 under M. G. Radhakrishnan. In an interview with Onmanorama, she identified a recording for Attahasam as her first film song and recalled that her early duet with K. J. Yesudas in Njan Ekananu reached audiences in 1982. Her early work also included a group song in Kummatty (1979). In 1983, she sang "Aalorungi Arangorungi", composed by Jerry Amaldev, for Ente Mamattukkuttiyammakku. "Aayiram Kannumayi", composed by Jerry Amaldev for Nokkethadhoorathu Kannum Nattu (1985), helped establish her as a playback singer. "Poomaname" from Nirakkoottu brought her a Kerala State Film Award.

Her collaboration with composer Ravi included "Manjal Prasadavum" from Nakhakshathangal (1986), for which she received the National Film Award for Best Female Playback Singer. She also sang "Indupushpam Choodi Nilkum Raathri" in Vaisali (1988), followed by "Kalarivilakku" in Oru Vadakkan Veeragatha (1989). Her performance in Vaisali earned another National Film Award.

During this period she worked with composers including Raveendran, Johnson, Jerry Amaldev, Ouseppachan and S. P. Venkatesh. In a retrospective published by The News Minute, music historian Ravi Menon described her ability to adapt to the different working methods of Raveendran and Johnson.

==== 1990–1999: Continued Malayalam playback work ====
Chithra's Kerala State Film Award wins extended across eleven consecutive award years, from 1985 to 1995. Her work with Johnson included "Paalapoove" from Njan Gandharvan and "Rajahamsame" from Chamayam (1993). She also recorded "Angopangam" for M. G. Radhakrishnan in Devaasuram (1993), and "Maleyam Marodalinju" for Sharreth in Thacholi Varghese Chekavar.

Her songs during the middle of the decade included Raveendran's "Aathmavin Pusthaka Thalil" from Mazhayethum Munpe (1995) and M. M. Keeravani's "Sasikala Charthiya" from Devaraagam (1996). In 1997, she sang "Ammoommakkili" in Chandralekha and the title song of Aniyathipraavu. Her subsequent recordings included Vidyasagar's "Aaro Viral Neetti" in Pranayavarnangal (1998).

==== 2000–2009: Collaborations and further awards ====
In 2000, Chithra recorded "Varmukile" for Raveendran in Mazha. She sang "Mooli Mooli" in Theerthadanam (2001), with music and lyrics by Kaithapram Damodaran Namboothiri, and "Karmukil Varnante" in Raveendran's soundtrack for Nandanam (2002). "Mooli Mooli" received the Kerala State Film Award for female playback singing. At the Kerala State Film Awards for 2005, she won the female playback singing award for "Mayangippoyi" from Nottam.

Raveendran's "Kalabham Tharam" from Vadakkumnadhan (2006) earned her a Filmfare Award for female playback singing. She won the Malayalam female playback singing award for "Oduvil Oru" from Thirakkatha at the Filmfare ceremony held in 2009, which recognised films from 2008.

==== 2010–2019: Further film recordings ====
In 2010, she received the Malayalam female playback singing award at the Filmfare Awards for Kerala Varma Pazhassi Raja. In January 2012, the Thikkurissy Foundation announced a playback singing award for her work in Khaddama. Her recordings during the decade also included "Ilaveyil" from Artist. In 2015, she sang "Oru Venal Kaattaay" with Sudeep Kumar for Vinu Thomas's soundtrack to Kanal.

She received the female playback singing award at the Kerala State Film Awards for 2016 for "Nadavathil" from Kambhoji. The awards were presented in 2017; M. Jayachandran also received the music direction award for the film. Her later work included "Pranayasaagaram", composed by Vishnu Sivasankar for Poomaram (2018). In 2019, she marked forty years as a playback singer.

==== 2020–2026: Recent work ====
In 2020, Chithra sang "Nee Vaa En Aarumukha" with Karthik for Alphons Joseph's soundtrack to Varane Avashyamund. Her 2021 recordings included "Theerame", a duet with Sooraj Santhosh composed by Sushin Shyam for Malik; "Kunju Kunjali", composed by Ronnie Raphael for Marakkar: Arabikadalinte Simham; and "Kaarmekham Moodunnu", composed by Ranjin Raj for Kaaval. In 2022 she sang "Mukilinte" in Hesham Abdul Wahab's soundtrack for Hridayam.

For Neelavelicham (2023), she recorded new versions of "Anuraga Madhuchashakam", "Pottithakarnna Kinavu" and "Vasantha Panchami". The songs, originally composed by M. S. Baburaj and sung by S. Janaki in Bhargavi Nilayam (1964), were recreated by Bijibal and Rex Vijayan. At the 69th Filmfare Awards South in 2024, she won the Malayalam female playback singing award for "Muttathe Mulla" from Jawanum Mullappoovum.

In 2025, she sang "Paka" in Justin Varghese's soundtrack for Ponman. A review in Cinema Express singled out the song and its placement in the film. In 2026, she sang "Hridhayamithezhuthum" with Rajkumar Radhakrishnan from Valathuvashathe Kallan, composed by Vishnu Shyam with lyrics by Vinayak Sasikumar.

=== Tamil cinema ===
Her Tamil film work includes collaborations with Ilaiyaraaja, A. R. Rahman, Deva, S. A. Rajkumar, Vidyasagar, Sirpy, Yuvan Shankar Raja, G. V. Prakash Kumar, Harris Jayaraj and Santhosh Narayanan.

==== Entry into Tamil cinema and early recordings ====
Chithra was introduced to Tamil cinema by Ilaiyaraaja in 1985 with "Poojaikketha Poovithu" from Neethana Antha Kuyil. Recalling her entry into the industry, she said that director Fazil had played one of her Malayalam recordings for Ilaiyaraaja, leading to an invitation to sing in Tamil. Her rendition of "Chinna Kuyil Paadum" in Poove Poochudava was associated with her nickname "Chinna Kuyil".

She sang "Paadariyen Padippariyen" for Sindhu Bhairavi (1985), winning her first National Film Award for Best Female Playback Singer. Her subsequent recordings included "Yedhedho Ennam Valarthen" in Punnagai Mannan (1986) and "Kuzhaloodhum Kannanukku" in Mella Thirandhathu Kadhavu (1986).

In a 2023 interview, Chithra described Ilaiyaraaja as her principal mentor and said that recording his compositions had required her to work across different genres and singing styles. Discussing her Tamil diction in 2021, she recalled that Vairamuthu had given her recordings of S. Janaki and asked her to practise the songs and send back her own versions; she said that she had also written to him in Tamil seeking corrections.

==== Recordings during the 1990s and 2000s ====
Her recordings in the early 1990s included "Thathithom" from Azhagan (1991). Chithra's collaboration with A. R. Rahman began with Roja. In a 2024 interview, she recalled that his recording process gave singers scope to experiment with expression and improvisation, with the final takes selected later. She sang Rahman's compositions "Azhagu Nilave" in Pavithra (1994) and "Kannalane" in Bombay (1995). Her performance of "Mana Madurai" in Minsara Kanavu received the National Film Award for Best Female Playback Singer for 1996.

In Kandukondain Kandukondain (2000), she recorded "Kannamoochi Yenada", composed by Rahman. She also sang "Angel Vanthale" for Badri (2001). In Autograph (2004), she performed "Ovvoru Pookalume", composed by Bharadwaj. The song's lyrics were written by Pa. Vijay. Her National Film Award for the film was announced in July 2005.

For Yuvan Shankar Raja's soundtrack to Chennai 600028 (2007), Chithra sang "Yaro Yarukko", written by Vaali, with S. P. Balasubrahmanyam. She reunited with Balasubrahmanyam for "Naan Pogiren", with lyrics by Thamarai, on James Vasanthan's Naanayam soundtrack, reviewed by Rediff.com in November 2009.

==== Recordings during the 2010s ====
Chithra featured with Ilaiyaraaja and Balasubrahmanyam on "Vaalibha Vaa Vaa" in Yuvan Shankar Raja's soundtrack to Goa (2010). She sang "Sandhikka Kangalil Inbangal" for Sharreth's soundtrack to 180 (2011). She also recorded the reprise version of "Yen Uyirey" for Achu Rajamani's Maalai Pozhudhin Mayakathilaey soundtrack.

Her work on Ghibran's Amara Kaaviyam soundtrack (2014) included "Mounam Pesum", which also featured Sowmya Mahadevan. In 2015, she sang Rahman's "Malargal Ketten" for O Kadhal Kanmani. The following year, she performed "Ariraro", composed by Santhosh Narayanan with lyrics by Vivek, for Kodi. In 2016, she also sang "Konji Pesida Venaam" with Sriram Parthasarathy for Sethupathi, composed by Nivas K. Prasanna with lyrics by Na. Muthukumar. Her later recordings included "Karuve", heard during the opening credits of Diya (2018).

==== Recordings during the 2020s ====
In December 2022, Chithra's "Soul of Varisu" was released as a single from Varisu. Composed by Thaman S with lyrics by Vivek, the song concerns the relationship between a mother and her son. In 2023, she sang "Veera Raja Veera", written by Ilango Krishnan, with Shankar Mahadevan and Harini for Rahman's soundtrack to Ponniyin Selvan: II. Chithra and Harini were jointly nominated in the Tamil Best Playback Singer (Female) category at the 2024 Filmfare Awards South for the song.

In December 2025, "Chendipoova" from Angammal was released, featuring Chithra's vocals. The song was composed by Mohammed Maqbool Mansoor with lyrics by Muthamil. Chithra has won four Tamil Nadu State Film Awards.

=== Telugu cinema ===
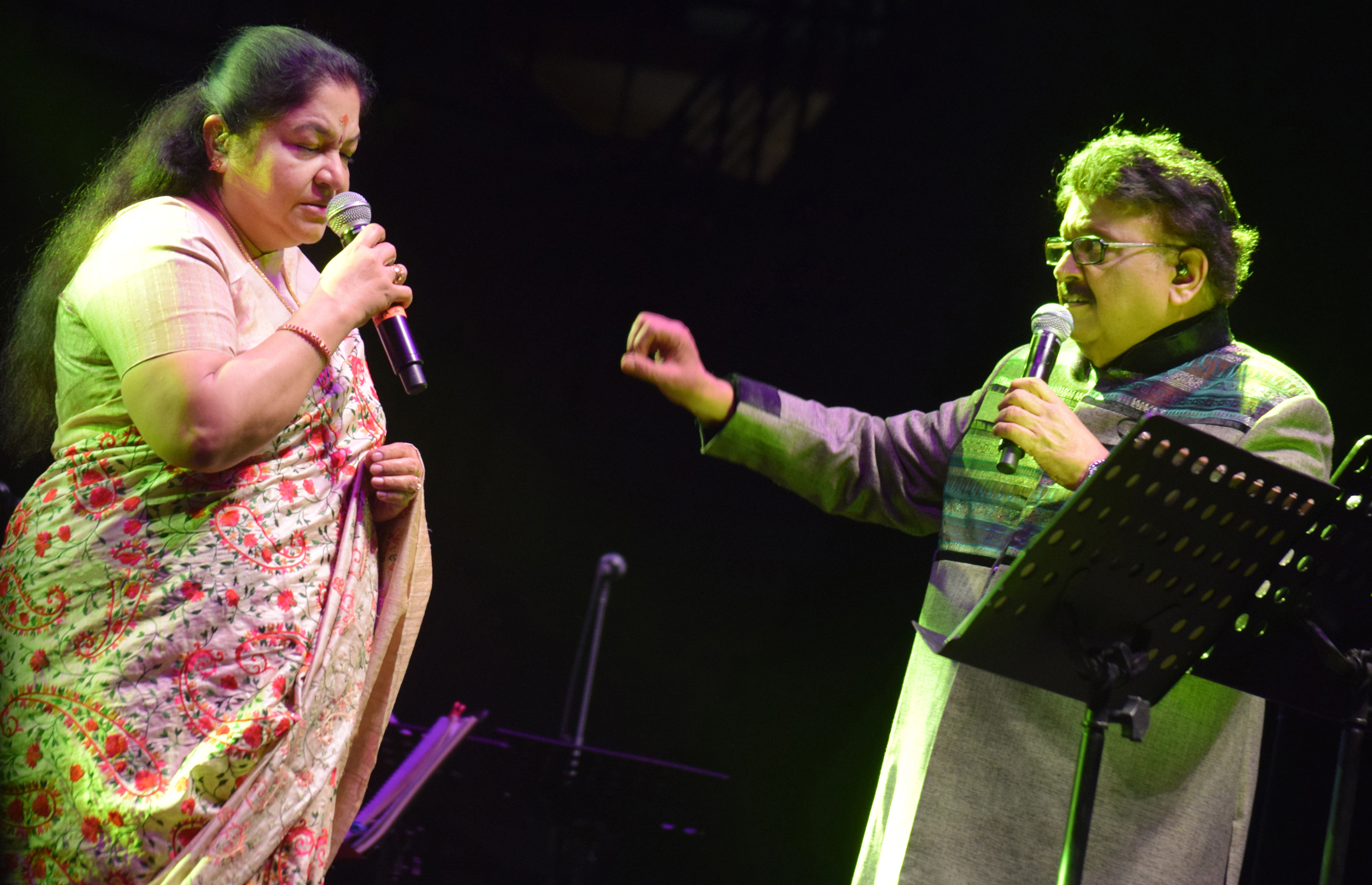
Chithra performing with S. P. Balasubrahmanyam

Chitra's first Telugu song was "Paadalenu Pallavaina", composed by Ilaiyaraaja for the Telugu-dubbed version of Sindhu Bhairavi (1985).

She subsequently contributed humming to a song sung by K. J. Yesudas in Pralayam (1985), composed by K. V. Mahadevan. Her first full song for an original Telugu film was "Gelupu Maade" from Vijrumbhana (1986), whose music was composed by Satyam. Between 1986 and 1988, she recorded songs for composers including Satyam, Raj–Koti, Ilaiyaraaja, K. V. Mahadevan and K. Chakravarthy.

She later credited S. P. Balasubrahmanyam with helping her understand Telugu words and express their emotional meaning when she was unfamiliar with the language. Her early recordings for Ilaiyaraaja included "Ninnukori Varnam" from Gharshana (1988). For Ilaiyaraaja's soundtrack to Geethanjali (1989), she sang the solo "Jallanta Kavvinta" and the duets "Nandikonda Vagullona" and "O Priya Priya" with Balasubrahmanyam. "Jallanta Kavvinta" contributed to her popularity in Telugu cinema.

==== Recordings and collaborations in the 1990s ====
Her recordings for Ilaiyaraaja included "Abbanee Tiyyani", sung with Balasubrahmanyam for Jagadeka Veerudu Athiloka Sundari (1990). She also worked with Bappi Lahiri, singing "Love Me My Hero" and "Chiluka Kshemama" with Balasubrahmanyam for Rowdy Alludu. Her first Nandi Award for Best Female Playback Singer, presented by the Government of Andhra Pradesh, was for "Kaliki Chilakala Koliki" from Seetharamayya Gari Manavaralu (1991). For Raj–Koti's soundtrack to Hello Brother (1994), she sang "Priya Raagale" with Balasubrahmanyam. Her Telugu recordings also included "Kannanu Le" from Bombay. Chithra's collaboration with M. M. Keeravani began when he was an assistant to K. Chakravarthy; she later said that singing his compositions had helped her learn Telugu.

==== Work in the 2000s ====
She sang "Kallalloki Kallu Petti" for Nuvve Kavali (2000), whose music was composed by Koti. For "Nuvvostanante Nenoddantana" from Varsham, she received both a Filmfare award and the Nandi Award for Best Female Playback Singer for 2004, with the Nandi result announced in October 2005. Responding to the Nandi announcement, she thanked composer Devi Sri Prasad and lyricist Sirivennela Seetharama Sastry for their contributions to the song. She recorded "Pranamlo Pranamga" for Kalyani Malik's soundtrack to Andhrudu. In a 2006 interview, Malik said that he selected Chithra after trying several new singers for the song. She also appeared as herself in the Telugu film Raraju (2006). In 2009, she sang for Sharreth's soundtrack to Kalavaramaye Madilo. Reviewing the film for Rediff.com, Radhika Rajamani praised the contribution of Chithra's singing to its melodies. She received the Nandi Award for Best Female Playback Singer for the film in the awards for 2009, announced in October 2010.

==== Work in the 2010s ====
For Ilaiyaraaja's Sri Rama Rajyam soundtrack in 2011, she sang "Devulle Mecchindi" and "Ramayanamu Sri Ramayanamu" with Shreya Ghoshal. In July 2014, she won the Filmfare Award for Best Female Playback Singer – Telugu for the title song of Seethamma Vakitlo Sirimalle Chettu. She sang "Gopikamma" for Mickey J. Meyer's soundtrack to Mukunda. In June 2017, she received the Filmfare Award for Best Female Playback Singer – Telugu for "Ee Premaki" from Nenu Sailaja. In November 2017, her Nandi Award for "Gopikamma" was reported as her eleventh award in the Best Female Playback Singer category.

==== Work and career reflections, 2020–2026 ====
In October 2021, "Antha Ishtam", sung by Chithra for Bheemla Nayak, was released as the film's second single, with music by Thaman S and lyrics by Ramajogayya Sastry. In a 2023 interview, she described Keeravani as an important contributor to her Telugu singing career and said that his compositions conveyed the situations for which they were written. In June 2025, "Parichayamila", sung by Chithra for 8 Vasantalu, was released as the film's second single, with music by Hesham Abdul Wahab and lyrics by Vanamali. Speaking at a Hyderabad press conference in September 2026, she recalled becoming emotional after recording "Kallalloki Kallu Petti" for Nuvve Kavali.

=== Kannada cinema ===
==== Early recordings and established collaborations ====
Chithra's early Kannada film recordings included "Vasantharajana" in Antharangada Mrudanga (1986), composed by M. Ranga Rao. She also recorded Kannada songs for G. K. Venkatesh and Satyam. Her collaborations in Kannada cinema have included Ilaiyaraaja, Rajan–Nagendra, Hamsalekha, V. Manohar, Gurukiran, V. Harikrishna and Arjun Janya.

S. P. Balasubrahmanyam was among her frequent collaborators in Kannada film music, alongside composer Hamsalekha. Discussing Hamsalekha in a 2025 interview, she described his musical style as distinctive and recalled learning from the senior musicians with whom she worked. Her Kannada repertoire includes "Kelisade Kallu Kallinali" from Belli Kalungura and "Tunturu" from Amruthavarshini (1997). The latter film's soundtrack was composed by Deva.

==== Composers, lyricists and fellow singers ====
Chithra continued her association with Deva on Akasha Gange (2008), directed by Dinesh Baboo, contributing three songs to a soundtrack with lyrics by K. Kalyan. In the same year, she sang "Thadeem Dheem Thana" for V. Harikrishna's soundtrack to Gaalipata. Her work with Mano Murthy included "Geleya Beku" in Moggina Manasu (2008), which she sang with Priya Himesh to lyrics by Jayant Kaikini.

Her collaborations with other playback singers included "Bhoomi Sutthodu" with Sonu Nigam for Sanchari (2010). For Aarakshaka (2012), she sang "Kuch Kuch" with Vijay Yesudas, with music by Gurukiran and lyrics by Kaviraj. She later recorded "Ondu Aproopada Gaana" with Rajesh Krishnan for Love in Mandya (2014); the song was composed by J. Anoop Seelin and written by Arasu Anthare.

For Urvi, composer and violinist Manoj George recorded her voice with an accompaniment made entirely from layered violin recordings. George explained that he altered the instrument's tuning and used digital processing to obtain sounds resembling other members of the string family.

Her Kannada recordings documented in 2026 included "Ondhe Ondu" from Brindavihari, composed by Hesham Abdul Wahab with lyrics by V. Nagendra Prasad. The song credits Chithra and Jaskaran Singh as singers, with folk vocals by Ananya Bhat.

==== Karnataka State Film Awards and other recognition ====
By 2023, Chithra had received three Karnataka State Film Awards. Her performance of "Hele Kogile" in Nammoora Mandara Hoove earned her first Karnataka state award. She won the best female playback singer award for Gattimela in the 2000–01 awards, announced in May 2001. She was also the best female playback singer recipient for 2004–05; those awards were presented in March 2006.

At the 2007 Filmfare Awards South, she won the Filmfare Award for Best Female Playback Singer – Kannada for My Autograph.

==== Screen appearance, performances and recording practice ====
Chithra appeared as herself in the Kannada film Mangalyam Tantunanena (1998). Her association with Bengaluru also included concert performances: she performed there in June 2023 and again during celebrations of her 45 years in cinema in 2025.

Recalling her earlier recording schedule, she described travelling from Chennai to Bengaluru for sessions at Chamundeshwari, Akash and Sanket studios. In interviews, she has explained that she studies the meaning of unfamiliar words and asks about a song's dramatic situation before recording it. She has also said that she can read Kannada, although she does not write it.

=== Hindi cinema ===
==== Early recordings and recognition ====
According to a profile published by Cinemaazi, Chithra made her first Hindi recording in 1985 for composer S. P. Venkitesh, for a film that was not commercially released. In Love (1991), she sang with S. P. Balasubrahmanyam for composers Anand–Milind. Their duets included "Saathiya Tune Kya Kiya" and "Priyatama", with lyrics by Majrooh Sultanpuri. Cinemaazi estimates her Hindi film repertoire at approximately 200 songs.

Her work with A. R. Rahman included "Kehna Hi Kya" from the Hindi soundtrack of Bombay (1995). In 2009, The Guardian included "Kehna Hi Kya" in its list of 1,000 songs everyone must hear. For M. M. Kreem's Criminal (1995), she contributed vocals to "Tum Mile Dil Khile", whose credited singers also include Kumar Sanu and Alka Yagnik. Her performance of "Payalein Chun Mun" in Virasat earned the National Film Award for Best Female Playback Singer for 1997, announced in May 1998.

==== Film recordings and collaborators ====
For Tum Bin (2001), Chithra sang "Tum Bin Jiya Jaye Kaise" and the duet "Pyar Humko Hone Laga" with Abhijeet. The songs were composed by Nikhil–Vinay, with lyrics by Faaiz Anwar. Her recordings for Anu Malik's Aśoka (2001) included two versions of "Raat Ka Nasha": a solo and a duet with Abhijeet.

Chithra had a substantial role in the soundtrack of Main Prem Ki Diwani Hoon (2003), singing on eight of its eleven tracks. In a contemporary interview, Malik explained that he had chosen Chithra, KK, Shaan and Sunidhi Chauhan to give the film a different vocal sound. The soundtrack, with lyrics by Dev Kohli, included her solo "Bani Bani", "Chali Aayee" and "O Ajnabi" with KK, and "Kasam Ki Kasam" with Shaan.

In the same year, she sang the title song of Koi... Mil Gaya with Udit Narayan, composed by Rajesh Roshan with lyrics by Ibrahim Ashk. She also recorded a solo for Armaan, composed by Shankar–Ehsaan–Loy with lyrics by Javed Akhtar. Her subsequent work included "Raat Hamari Toh" from Parineeta (2005), composed by Shantanu Moitra and sung with its lyricist, Swanand Kirkire. She joined Daler Mehndi on the title track of Rang De Basanti, composed by Rahman with lyrics by Prasoon Joshi. Her later Hindi film recordings included "Tu Mila" for The Kerala Story (2023).

==== Private albums and other collaborations ====
Outside film music, Chithra collaborated with Ustad Sultan Khan on Piya Basanti (2000), composed by Sandesh Shandilya. The title song was written by Khilesh Sharma, while "Shaam Dhale" had lyrics by Yash Sharma. Pradeep Sarkar directed the album's music videos. Piya Basanti won the International Viewers' Choice award at the 2001 MTV Music Video Awards. Chithra has also been described as the "Piya Basanti" of North India.

She also collaborated with Bhupinder Singh on Sunset Point (2000), a concept album with music by Vishal Bhardwaj. Gulzar wrote the lyrics and narrated the story connecting the songs; the album included "Kachche Rang", "Aa Chal Doob Ke Dekhe" and "Aasmani Rang".

Chithra and Sultan Khan recorded a follow-up to Piya Basanti in 2005. Initially titled Sehri Sehri, it was released after Khan's death as Piya Basanti... Again in 2012. Released by Sony Music India, the sequel again featured Shandilya's compositions. In 2015, she recorded the Hindi song "Duniya Jise..." for Andaz, composed by Ramesh Narayanan with lyrics by Nida Fazli.

Her association with Rahman also extended to live performance. During his 2007 concert tour, she performed alongside singers including Hariharan, Sadhana Sargam and Sukhwinder Singh. In an interview during the tour, she discussed learning the different layers of Rahman's compositions.

==== Awards and nominations for Hindi-language work ====
Chithra won the National Film Award for Best Female Playback Singer for "Payalein Chun Mun" from Virasat for the 1997 film year; the award was announced in May 1998. The same performance earned her the Screen Award for Best Female Playback Singer for the films of 1997. She was also nominated for the Filmfare Award for Best Female Playback Singer for the song at the 1998 Filmfare Awards.

Her non-film album Piya Basanti won the International Viewers' Choice award at the 2001 MTV Video Music Awards. For her work in Koi... Mil Gaya, she won the Best Singer – Female (Film) award at the 2003 MTV Immies and the Best Singer – Female award at the 2004 Bollywood Movie Awards.

The title song of Koi... Mil Gaya also brought her a nomination for Best Female Playback Singer at the 2004 Filmfare Awards. She received a nomination in the same category for the song at the inaugural Apsara Film & Television Producers Guild Awards.

=== Odia cinema ===
Chithra's work in Odia cinema includes the soundtrack of Mo Kanhu Re, for which she recorded "Maa Lo Maa", "Band Kothari" and "Kanhu Re Kanhu". The Indian Performing Right Society lists Radha Krushna Bhanja as the lyricist of "Band Kothari" and "Kanhu Re Kanhu". The soundtrack also featured recordings by Mano and Minmini. Orissa Cinema's historical list of Odisha State Film Awards names Chithra as the 1993 winner of the Best Female Playback Singer award for Mo Kanhu Re.

For Pacheri Uthila Majhi Duaru, she recorded "Sajani Mo Sajani" and "Jaha Mun Jibane Jani Nathili" with Debashish Mohapatra. The film's music was composed by Prafulla Kar. She also sang "To Premare" with Debasish for the film.

=== Bengali cinema ===
Chithra sang for the Bengali film Nagpanchami (1994), produced by L. V. Prasad, with music by Prafulla Kar and lyrics by Pulak Bandyopadhyay. Her recordings for the film included "Janma Janma Nebo Tomay Cheye" and "Aay Re Basanta Aay", sung with S. P. Balasubrahmanyam. She also sang "Chal Chal Haati Tui Chal" and "Nagpanchami Nagpanchami" for the soundtrack.

For Shudhu Ekbar Bolo (1999), directed by Prabhat Roy and produced by D. Ramanaidu's Suresh Productions, she sang on a soundtrack credited to Babul Bose and Koti, with lyrics by Bandyopadhyay. Her duets with Babul Supriyo for the film included "Bolo Shudhu Ek Baar", "Hey Gore Gore America", "Kokila Kokila Tu Gaye" and "Oh Daddy Daddy Love You".

== Television ==
Year	Name of Television Show	Role	Network	Language	Country
2006-2007	Star Singer (season 1)	Judge	Asianet	Malayalam	India
2007	Super Singer Junior (season 1)	Judge	Star Vijay	Tamil	India
2008	Apple Mega Star	Judge	Jeevan TV	Malayalam	India
2009-2010	Super Singer Junior (season 2)	Judge	Star Vijay	Tamil	India
2009-2010	Star Singer (season 4)	Judge	Asianet	Malayalam	India
2010-2011	Star Singer (season 5)	Judge	Asianet	Malayalam	India
2011-2012	Star Singer (season 6)	Judge	Asianet	Malayalam	India
2011-2012	Super Singer Junior (season 3)	Judge	Star Vijay	Tamil	India
2012	Ningalkkum Aakaam Kodeeshwaran (season 1)	Contestant	Asianet	Malayalam	India
2013	Indian Voice Junior	Judge	Mazhavil Manorama	Malayalam	India
2014	Super Singer Junior (season 4)	Judge	Star Vijay	Tamil	India
2014-2015	Star Maa Super Singer 8	Judge	Star Maa	Telugu	India
2015	Indian Music League	Judge	Flowers TV	Malayalam	India
2016-2017	Super Singer Junior (season 5)	Judge	Star Vijay	Tamil	India
2016	Super Star junior 5	Judge	Amrita TV	Malayalam	India
2018-2019	Super Singer Junior (season 6)	Judge	Star Vijay	Tamil	India
2018	Padutha theeyaga	Guest Judge	ETV	Telugu	India
2019-2020	Paadam Namuk Paadam	Judge	Mazhavil Manorama	Malayalam	India
2020	Super Singer Junior (season 7)	Judge	Star Vijay	Tamil	India
2020	Yaar Antha Star (season 7)	Judge	Vasantham	Tamil	Singapore
2020-2022	Star Singer (season 8)	Judge	Asianet	Malayalam	India
2021-2022	Super Singer Junior (season 8)	Judge	Star Vijay	Tamil	India
2022	Star Maa Super Singer junior (Season 2)	Judge	Star Maa	Telugu	India
2022-2023	Star Singer Junior (season 3)	Guest Jury	Asianet	Malayalam	India
2023	Sa Re Ga Ma Pa Li'l Champs (Season 19)	Guest Judge	Zee Kannada	Kannada	India
2023	Super Singer Junior (season 9)	Judge	Star Vijay	Tamil	India
2023-2024	Star Singer (season 9)	Judge	Asianet	Malayalam	India
2023 – present	Yaar Antha Star (season 8)	Judge	Vasantham	Tamil	Singapore
2024	Super Singer 10	Guest	Star Vijay	Tamil	India
2024-2025	Super Singer Junior season 10	Judge	Star Vijay	Tamil	India
2025-present	Star Singer (season 10)	Judge	Asianet	Malayalam	India
2026-present	Super Singer Junior season 11	Judge	Star Vijay	Tamil	India

== International concert performances ==
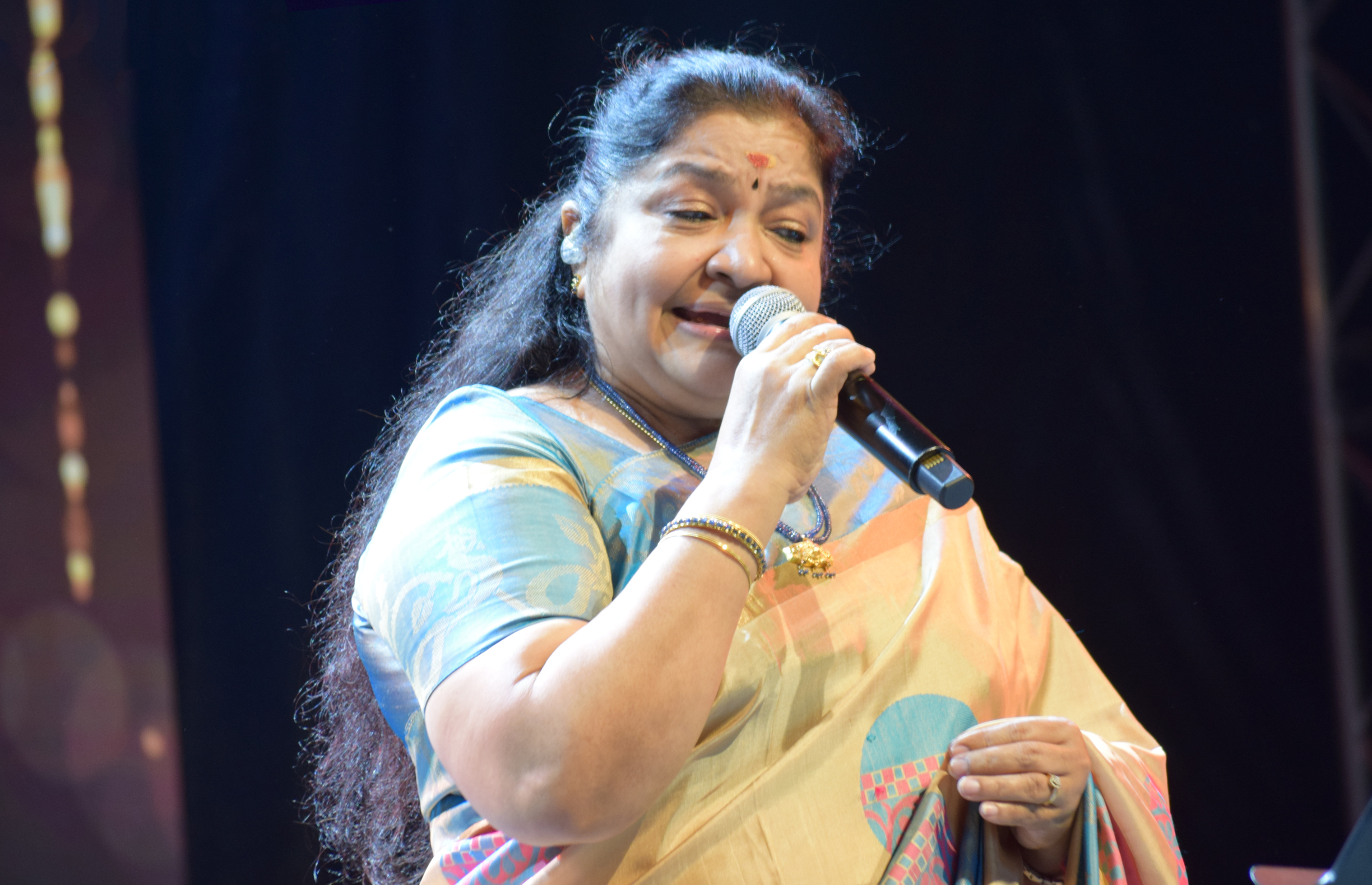
Chithra performing at a concert

K. S. Chithra's international concert appearances include the Royal Albert Hall in London in 2001, the Sydney Opera House in 2012, and the Kennedy Center Concert Hall in Washington, D.C., in 1995. In Singapore, she has made multiple appearances at the Esplanade Concert Hall, including in 2017, and The Star, Singapore, including in 2022. In 2025, she sang with the Malaysian Philharmonic Orchestra at Dewan Filharmonik Petronas in Kuala Lumpur, in what the orchestra described as the venue's first live Indian orchestral concert.

Other venues include OVO Arena Wembley in London in 2026, the Prudential Center in Newark, New Jersey, in 2016, 3Arena in Dublin in 2026, Rudolf Weber-Arena in Oberhausen in 2026, and EagleBank Arena in Fairfax, Virginia, in 2016. She has also appeared at Auckland's Kiri Te Kanawa Theatre in 2026, the Sydney Coliseum Theatre in 2023, The Trusts Arena in Auckland in 2026, and O2 Academy Glasgow in 2024.

Her international appearances also include the Qinghai International Water and Life Music Journey concert in China in 2009, which featured the China National Symphony Orchestra. In November 2019, Chithra became the first Indian artist invited by Saudi authorities to perform an official concert in the kingdom, appearing before more than 20,000 spectators. In Dubai, she appeared at the Dubai World Trade Centre in 2021 and at the Green Dubai World Forum at Atlantis, The Palm in 2008. among other international venues.

== Non-film recordings and collaborations ==
=== Studio albums ===
Chithra recorded her first studio album with Voodoo Rapper for the album called Ragga Raaga in 1993. She recorded the albums in Hindi, Piya Basanti (2000) and Sunset Point. She associated with Ustad Sultan Khan for Piya Basanti which was certified Gold. Sunset Point had eight songs written and narrated by Gulzar and sung by Chithra and Bhupinder. In 2006, she released an album in dedication to M. S. Subbulakshmi named My Tribute. It is a collection of Kritis and bhajans dedicated to Subbulakshmi. In 2009 she released Nightingale: A Salute to Lataji, a musical tribute to Lata Mangeshkar on her 80th birthday. She also recorded many Malayalam albums for K. J. Yesudas, M. Jayachandran and Sharreth compositions. She also planned a ghazal album with Ghulam Ali and Asha Bhosle.

=== International projects ===
- Collaborated with singer Jawad Al Ali on his album Amar Ul Hob (also titled Amr El Hob), released in 2009.
- Recorded a song for the jazz pianist Herbie Hancock

== Critical reception ==
=== International media ===
Chithra has received critical acclaim from international media outlets across several countries. The BBC Asian Network has described her as "the legendary singer whose music has shaped generations." The Guardian has noted that her vocals display "extravagant vocal gymnastics" and "set a new standard." Eastern Eye called her "one of the best playback singers Indian cinema has ever produced," praising her "mellifluous" and "sensuous" voice. Rolling Stone referred to her as "the prolific and feted" playback singer who continues to "weave her magic."

In the Gulf region, Gulf News described her as "a true legend" with a "mesmerising voice" and "impressive command over her vocal skills" in a review of her 2021 Dubai concert. Khaleej Times has described her voice as "supremely sweet and melodic," while the Oman Observer has referred to her as "the renowned playback singer with a melodious voice."

In Southeast Asia, Singapore broadcaster Mediacorp has called her "a musical titan" with a "mellifluous voice," praising her "soul-stirring renditions" and "enchanting vocals." In Malaysia, Malay Mail described her as "one of India's most versatile singers," and the national news agency BERNAMA called her "India's leading playback singer." In China, she was counted among the world's "top-tier artists" invited to perform at the 2009 Qinghai International River Festival.

=== National media ===
Indian national media have widely praised Chithra's voice and career. The Indian Express praised her "ethereal vocals" and described her as a "radiant star" of playback singing. The Times of India has called her "a living legend with a melodious voice," and separately noted that her "melodious and soothing voice" has made her "an icon in the truest sense." India Today has described her voice as one of India's "golden voices." Filmfare has said that "K. S. Chithra's voice is the perfect accompaniment."

== Legacy ==
Chithra has been praised by numerous musicians and collaborators throughout her career. Academy Award– and Grammy-winning jazz legend Herbie Hancock described her as "a singer with a warm, round tone." Maestro Ilaiyaraaja has said, "Give her anything and she can sing it," praising her voice, pronunciation and quick grasp of music. Academy Award– and Grammy-winning composer A. R. Rahman has praised Chithra's humility and musical achievements, telling her, "Chithraji, you are a rockstar". He credited her with carrying forward the legacy of earlier musical greats, saying, "She is the only person who handled it so beautifully in the South." Rahman also remarked that, during her prime, she could record up to 20 songs in a day. According to The News Minute, he waited for her return from an overseas trip to record "Malargal Ketten" for O Kadhal Kanmani (2015), believing that no other singer could do justice to the song. Indian cinema legend Kamal Haasan has praised her pronunciation, grasp and mastery of languages, saying "in every language, she rules." Indian cinema icon Mohanlal has called her "the favourite singer of generations."

Academy Award–winning composer M. M. Keeravani said he is "very fond of her voice," comparing her accuracy to a tape recorder and noting that such talent "appears only once in two or three decades." Legendary playback singer Asha Bhosle has said, "Chithra jo hai, woh sabse achchha gaati hai" ("Chithra sings the best"). Legendary playback singer S. P. Balasubrahmanyam said, "Kerala is blessed to have singers like Chitra." Legendary vocalist K. J. Yesudas has referred to her as "my daughter." Renowned singer Hariharan has said she "starts where everyone finishes," before going another two or three octaves higher.

Celebrated playback singer Shreya Ghoshal has called her "the singer I always look up to, my biggest idol". Legendary playback singer S. Janaki reportedly said, "From now on, my daughter will sing for me." Legendary playback singer P. Susheela said, "Chithra sings my songs better than me." Veteran Bollywood composer Anu Malik said, "I think Chitra is at par with Lataji and Ashaji," referring to Lata Mangeshkar and Asha Bhosle. Celebrated playback singer Kavita Krishnamurti has called her "an outstanding singer from my generation," praising her trained, "crystal-clear" voice. Grammy-winning singer-composer Shankar Mahadevan has said she inspired him both as a singer and as a person, among other fellow composers and singers who have credited her influence and support.

Veteran Carnatic vocalist and Chithra's guru K. Omanakutty recalled being "astounded" hearing her sing as a child and being certain she would "reach great heights." Indian-American singer Vidya Vox has named Chithra among the artists who inspired her, calling a collaboration with her "a dream."

== Philanthropy and social activities ==
Chithra, along with a Kerala-based satellite channel, Asianet Cable Vision (ACV), jointly launched a fundraising organisation, Sneha Nandana, to raise funds for the welfare of retired musicians who have lost their careers due to changes in the music industry. She launched this organisation on the occasion of her completion of three decades in the music playback industry. She said that the fund would provide help and montly pension to the musicians with financial impediments and those suffering from health problems. A cultural event called Chithra Pournami was held on 15 February 2011 at Thiruvananthapuram to celebrate the 30th year of her career and also to launch this organisation.

== Awards, honours, and recognition ==
She is honoured with the title First Ladies by the President of India in 2018 for being the first Indian woman to be honoured by British Parliament at House of Commons, United Kingdom in 2003. In 2024, she was again honoured by the British Parliament, United Kingdom, with the title The Greatest Indian Singer of All Times. In 2009, She became the first Indian artist to be honoured by Government of China while performing live at the Qinghai International river festival. On 20 March 2025, She was formally honoured by the Parliament of South Australia in recognition of her outstanding contributions to Indian music. She was honoured by the Texas House of Representatives, Government of Texas, United States of America, for her lasting contributions to music and the arts. In 2025, she was honoured in the United States with a Joint Legislative Resolution from the State of New Jersey and a Mayoral Proclamation from the Township of Edison for her outstanding contributions to music and philanthropy. On 19 October 2025, the K. S. Chithra Day was proclaimed by the Shelby County Government in Memphis, Tennessee via a mayoral proclamation from the Office of the Mayor. She was honoured by the Government of Sharjah, United Arab Emirates, with a Lifetime Achievement Award in recognition of her distinguished contributions to Indian music and her five-decade-long career. Chithra is a recipient of 6 National Film Awards, 10 Filmfare Awards South and 43 State Government awards from 8 states of India including 18 from Kerala, 12 from United Andhra Pradesh, 5 from Tamil Nadu, 4 from Karnataka, and 1 each from Odisha, West Bengal, Madhya Pradesh and Maharashtra governments She was awarded India's third-highest civilian honours Padma Bhushan in 2021 and Padma Shri in 2005 for her valuable contributions towards the Indian musical fraternity.

Barring Lata Mangeshkar, she also remains the second female playback singer from India to have performed at the prestigious Royal Albert Hall in London in 2001 and her Performance was applauded with much appreciation by a roomful of an international audience. Her song "Kannalane/Kehna Hi Kya" from the film Bombay (1995) was included in United Kingdom The Guardian's "1000 Songs Everyone Must Hear Before You Die" list.

== Personal life ==
Chithra is married to Vijayashankar, an engineer and businessman. They had a daughter who was born with Down syndrome, and drowned in a pool in Dubai in 2011 when Chithra was about to perform at an A. R. Rahman concert.
