= Time Out (2015 film) =

- Movie poster for Time Out
- Directed by: Rikhil Bahadur
- Written by: Rikhil Bahadur
- Starring: Chirag Malhotra; Pranay Pachauri
- Cinematography: Ravinder Kumar
- Music by: Sandesh Shandilya; Sanchit Balhara
- Production company: Aexor Entertainment
- Distributed by: Viacom18 Motion Pictures
- Release date: 25 September 2015
- Running time: 1 hour 38 min
- Language: Hindi

Time Out is a Bollywood film starring Chirag Malhotra and Pranay Pachauri, written and directed by Rikhil Bahadur.

== Plot ==
Gaurav finds out that his elder brother Mihir is gay. He is unable to accept this as he looks up to Mihir, a high-school jock whom every girl fancies. Adding to his woes, the girl he fancies ‘friend-zones’ him.

“How to fix your gay kid” is what their mother types into Google when Mihir reveals his sexual orientation and wishes to come out of the closet.

== Cast ==
- Chirag Malhotra as Gaurav
- Pranay Pachauri as Mihir
- Vedabrata Rao as Varun
- Sanya Arora as Kanika
- Riya Kothari as Tanvi
- Raunaq Chopra as Zorawar
- Shiva Dawar as Keith
- Tarana Marwah as Ria
- Amitabh Sharma as Pankaj Agarwal
- Geetanjali Sharma as Shobha Aggarwal
- Kaamya Sharma as Ananya
- Aditya Jain as Rohan
- Rahul Sharma as Coach P.K.
- Rahul Tripathi as Rahul Tripathi

== Soundtrack ==
The music of Time Out was composed by Sandesh Shandilya.

Track listing
No.	Title	Singer(s)	Length
1.	"Hurdangi"	Mohan Kannan, Sanchit Balhara
2.	"Bheja Khali"	Amit Mishra, Piyush Kapoor
3.	"Kuch Kareebi"	Sandesh Shandilya
4.	"Bolenge"	Amit Mishra
