= Kya Love Story Hai =

- Poster
- Directed by: Lovely Singh
- Written by: Rahul Singh
- Produced by: N.R. Pachisia
- Starring: Ayesha Takia; Tusshar Kapoor
- Cinematography: Rajeev Shrivastava
- Edited by: Steven H. Bernard
- Music by: Songs: Pritam; Background Score: Sanjoy Chowdhury
- Production companies: VR Entertainers; Adlabs Films
- Distributed by: Studio 18
- Release date: 20 April 2007
- Running time: 125 minutes
- Country: India
- Language: Hindi

Kya Love Story Hai (transl. What a Love Story) is a 2007 Indian Hindi-language romantic comedy film directed by Lovely Singh, starring Tusshar Kapoor and Ayesha Takia in the lead roles.

== Plot ==
The story is based in Cape Town, South Africa. Arjun is a wealthy orphan who spends his time in leisure with his friends, Romeo and Chiku. Usually getting them out of sticky situations and supporting them. One day, Arjun's path crosses with Kajal, and he is instantly attracted to her. He starts to befriend Kajal but hesitates to confess his feelings for her. One day, Kajal reads a draft of Arjun's love letter. Unaware that she is Arjun's crush, Kajal tells him that she desires a self-made, successful man as her life partner and not someone who has been left money by their ancestors. An upset Arjun travels to Mumbai to establish his career as an architect and thus become a self made man.

In the months of Arjun's absence, Kajal meets Ranveer Oberoi, a successful business magnate. Ranveer's mother takes a liking to Kajal and encourages her to date her son. They grow close, but Kajal often reminisces about Arjun and misses him. Although Ranveer is Kajal's ideal man, his workaholic tendencies occasionally discomfort her and she feels uncertain about the love and commitment he has towards her because he seems more committed to his business.

Arjun returns as a successful architect, but is upset to discover Ranveer and Kajal are engaged to be married soon. Nevertheless, he supports the couple. Ranveer becomes jealous of Kajal's friendship with Arjun, but is surprised when the latter continues to support him. Unbeknownst to Arjun, Kajal also learns of his unrequited feelings towards her. Ranveer also suspects that Arjun has feelings for Kajal and confronts him about it, urging him to confess to her. Kajal approaches Arjun and admits to being in love with him. Eventually, Kajal and Ranveer amicably cancel their marriage, and she marries Arjun instead.

== Cast ==
- Tusshar Kapoor as Arjun Bhatt
- Ayesha Takia as Kajal Mehra
- Karan Hukku as Ranveer Oberoi
- Bikramjeet Kanwarpal as Mr. Ronit Mehra: Kajal's father
- Sujata Kumar as Sanjana Oberoi, Ranveer's mother
- Rahul Singh as Chiku: Arjun's friend
- Shyam Mashalkar as Romeo: Arjun's friend
- Poonam Gipson as Suzzane: Kajal's friend
- Liza Ackermann as Vanilla: Chiku's love interest
- Kareena Kapoor in a special appearance in the song It's Rocking

== Soundtrack ==
Kya Love Story Hai

Soundtrack album by Pritam Chakraborty
- Released: 17 March 2007
- Genre: Feature film soundtrack
- Label: T-Series
- Producer: Pritam Chakraborty

The song "It's Rocking" includes sample of very popular 1957 song "Ude Jab Jab Zulfein Teri", which was sung by Asha Bhosle and Mohammed Rafi for the Bollywood film Naya Daur.

Song	Singer(s)	Duration
"I Miss You Every Day"	Shaan	5:32
"It's Rocking"	Alisha Chinoy	4:59
"Gumsum Hai Dil Mera"	Sonu Nigam	5:14
"Aye Khuda"	Kunal Ganjawala	4:17
"Deewana Teri Aankhon Ka"	Joy, Jojo	3:45
"Jeena Kya Tere Bina"	Zubeen Garg	6:05
"I Miss You Every Day" - Remix	Shaan	5:11
"Jeena Kya Tere Bina" - Remix	Zubeen Garg	5:45
