= Sophie Choudry =

British singer and actress

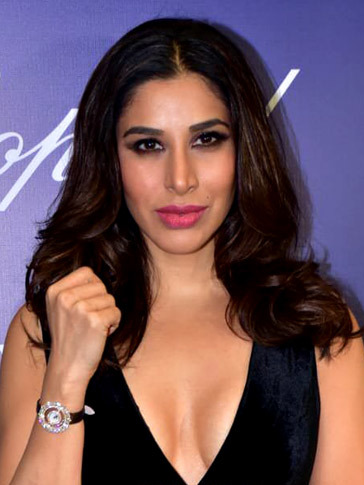
- Choudry in 2018
- Born: 8 February 1982 (age 44); Manchester, England
- Other names: Sophia, Sophiya, Sophie
- Education: London School of Economics, Sciences Po, Paris and London Academy of Music and Dramatic Art
- Occupations: Actress, singer, TV presenter
- Years active: 1999–present

Sophie Choudry (born 8 February 1982) is a British singer and actress based in India. She has been active primarily in Hindi-language films and is also a former MTV India VJ and occasional model, and television presenter.

== Early life ==
Sophie Choudry was born in Manchester and brought up in London. Her father was a major fan of Sophia Loren and hence her birthname is "Sophia", however she now goes by the name "Sophie". She has an elder brother.

Choudry studied at London School of Economics, graduating in European politics and French and is also a gold medalist from the London Academy of Music and Dramatic Art. Furthermore, she studied for nearly two years at the "Sciences Po" in Paris, France. BollySpice reports, that while still studying, Choudry became a VJ for Zee UK.

She took a few classes in Indian classical dance as Bharatnatyam, which she learnt in London for four years as well as Western dances like salsa. She is also well trained in Western classical music, which she learnt for three years in the UK from Helena Shenel, as well as in Indian classical music, which she learnt from Pandit Ashkaran Sharma.

== Career ==
=== Music ===
Choudry began her singing career. When she was 12 years old, her talent was discovered by noted music director Biddu, who launched her musical career. She, at first, lent her voice as a backup singer to playback singers like Shweta Shetty and Alisha Chinai.

In 2000, Choudry started her career as a pop singer with her all-female band "Sansara" with a song which Choudry herself wrote ("Yeh Dil Sun Raha Hai"). After their second hit “Habibi” the band separated and Choudry started her solo singing career, donning the videos "Habibi" and "Le Le Mera Dil" in 2002. Her latest single 'Aaj Naiyo Sauna'

Choudry then moved to Mumbai in 2003, becoming a VJ for MTV India and hosting the popular show MTV Loveline, which eventually gained her popularity. Less than one year on, Sophie returned with her newest offering, “Sophie and Dr Love”. Her version of the song “Mera Babu Chail Chabila” became a chartbuster. She followed it up with what went on to become her biggest hit album “Babylove”. According to Choudry, she listened to over 400 songs to come up with her perfect 12. Songs on this album include "Ek Pardesi Mera Dil Le Gaya", "Jadugar Saiyaan", "Zuby Zuby", "Dil Ke Armaan", "Ghar Aaya Mera Pardesi", and "Bachke Rehna Re Baba".

In December 2009, Choudry launched her album Sound of Sophie, which had no remixes, but only original numbers. The launch of this album marked her association with the Indian fashion brand MADAME, who hired her as their first brand ambassador. She worked with well-known music composers such as Rishi Rich, Bappi Lahiri, Biddu and Gaurav Das Gupta in the album. Choudry has also participated in Jhalak Dikhhla Jaa, Season 7.

=== Films ===
Sophie made her film debut with David Dhawan's Shaadi No. 1 in 2005. Her next release was Pyaar Ke Side Effects (2006). In 2013, she appeared in an extended cameo in Once Upon ay Time in Mumbai Dobaara! and in a dance number in Shootout at Wadala. In 2014, she appeared in another dance number in Telugu-language film 1: Nenokkadine.

=== Other ventures ===
In December 2017, she launched a wellness company called Lifetox with her partners. They developed a fitness ayurvedic tea called Fittox and more products including Lifetox vitamins since then.

== Filmography ==
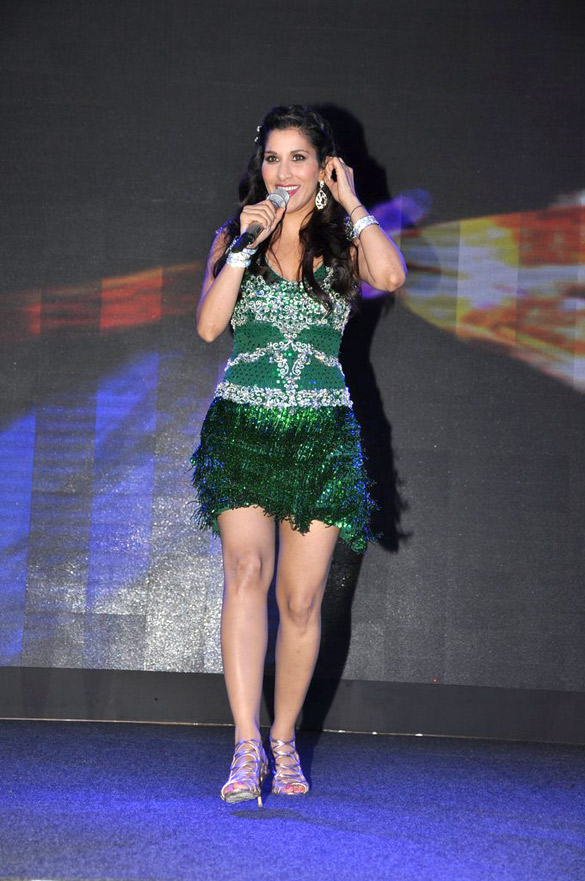
Sophie Choudry at Blackberry curve's launch party

- All films are in Hindi unless otherwise noted.

Year	Film	Role	Notes
2005	Shaadi No. 1	Dimple Kothari	credited as Sophie
2005	Pyaar Ke Side Effects	Tanya	
2005	I See You	Dilnaaz Bagga	
2007	Heyy Babyy	Herself	Special appearance
2007	Aggar	Nisha Raval	
2007	Speed	Monica Monteiro	
2008	Money Hai Toh Honey Hai	Herself	Special appearance
2008	Kidnap	Herself	Special appearance
2009	Aa Dekhen Zara	Bindiya Avasti	
2009	Daddy Cool	Ayesha	
2009	Chintuji	Menka	
2009	Alibaug	Nisha	
2011	Vedi	Herself	Tamil film; special appearance
2013	Shootout at Wadala	Herself	Special appearance in the song
2013	Once Upon ay Time in Mumbai Dobaara!	Mrs. Dixit	
2014	1: Nenokkadine	Herself	Telugu film; special appearance in the song "London Babu"
2024	Love Sex Aur Dhokha 2	Herself	Special appearance

=== TV appearances ===
Year	Title	Role	Notes
2014	Jhalak Dikhhla Jaa Season 7	Contestant	6th Place
2026 –	Famously Fit With Sophie	Host	

== Discography ==
- "Yeh Dil Sun Raha Hai" (2000) as part of Sansara
- "Habibi" (2000)
- "Le Le Mera Dil" (2002)
- "Sophie & Dr. Love" (2003)
- "Baby Love - Sophie" (2004)
- "Aap Jaisa Koi" in Sweet Honey Mix (2004)
- "Sound of Sophie" (2009)
- "Hungama Ho Gaya" (2012) digital single
- "Hungama Ho Gaya" (2013) compilation album
- "Do You Know Baby" (2015)
- "Aaj Naiyo Sauna" (2019)
- “Gori Hai” (2022)
- “Aaj main Nachna” (2022)
- “Lips” (2024)

== Awards ==
- 2001: UK Asian Pop Award for Best Female Newcomer
- 2004: Lycra MTV Style Award for Most Stylish Female in Music
- 2005: Bollywood Music Award for Best Female Pop Artist
- 2019, Fit and Fab Icon
- 2023 Most stylish pop diva of the year , Bollywood Hungama
- 2024: Most stylish pop diva, Pinkvilla
- 2024: Most stylish pop sensation of the year, Bollywood Hungama
