= Sharjah Municipality =

Government of Sharjah municipal body

Coordinates: 25.356690°N 55.400892°E

Sharjah Municipality (SM) Municipalities of Sharjah
- ببلدية الشارقة
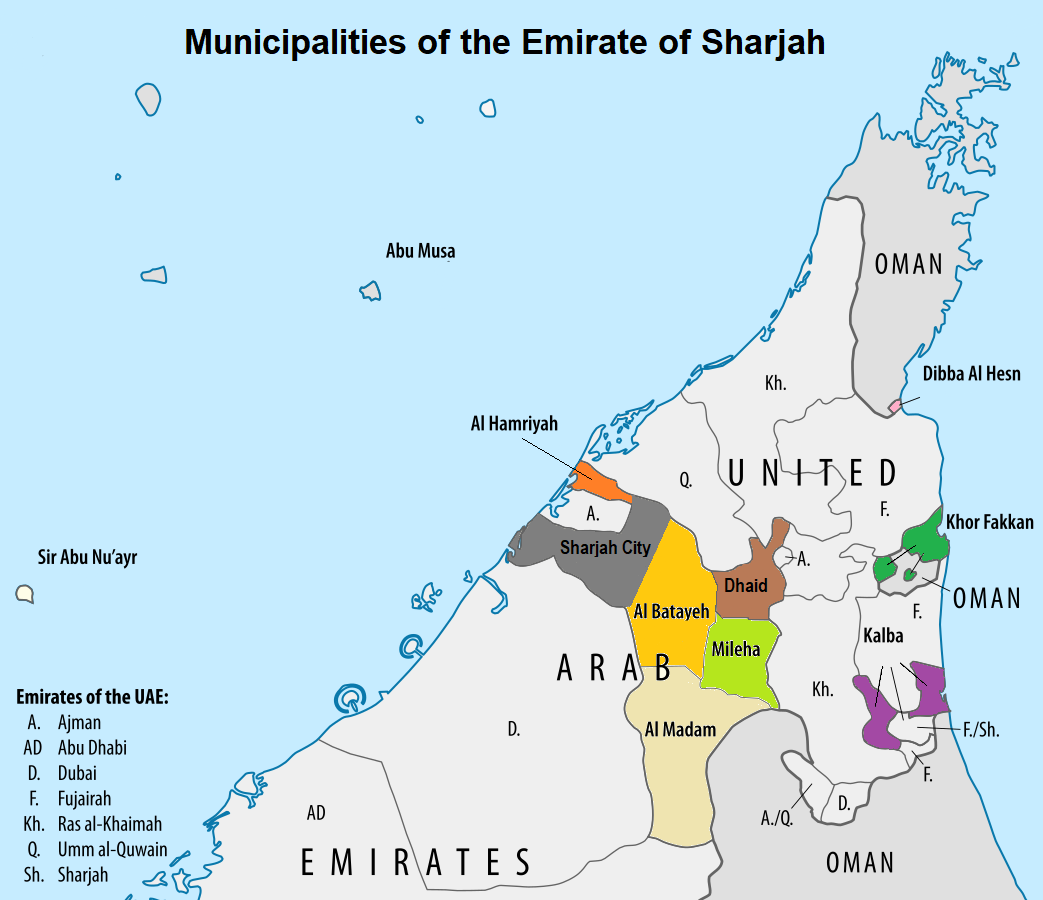

Agency overview
- Jurisdiction: Emirate of Sharjah
- Headquarters: Al Mussalla Sharjah, United Arab Emirates
- Agency executive: Eng. Sultan Abdulla Al Mualla, Director-General
- Child agencies: Waste & Sewerage Agency; Public Facilities Agency; Environment, Health & Safety Agency; Buildings Regulation & Permits Agency
- Website: shjmun.gov.ae

Sharjah Municipality (Arabic: ببلدية الشارقة) or Municipalities of Sharjah is the Government of Sharjah municipal body with jurisdiction over city services and the upkeep of facilities in the Emirate of Sharjah, United Arab Emirates. There are nine municipalities in the Emirate of Sharjah. It reports directly to the Sharjah Executive Council.

== History ==
Sharjah Municipality was established in 1927 and is one of the oldest municipalities in the UAE. However, the modern system of the municipality as a multiple service providing body began in 1971, when a decree was issued to define the domain of its activities and to give it the authority to supervise all public utilities and public services provided to its citizens. The Emirate of Sharjah operates on economic and social levels.

== Municipalities of Sharjah ==
There are nine municipalities in the Sharjah Emirate:

- Sharjah Municipality
- Hamriyah Municipality
- Al Bataeh Municipality
- Al Madam Municipality
- Mleiha Municipality
- Dhaid Municipality
- Kalba Municipality
- Khor Fakkan Municipality
- Dibba Al-Hisn Municipality
