= Shaadi No. 1 =

2005 film by David Dhawan

- Directed by: David Dhawan
- Written by: Milap Zaveri
- Based on: Kothigalu Saar Kothigalu (Kannada)
- Produced by: Vashu Bhagnani
- Starring: Sanjay Dutt; Fardeen Khan; Zayed Khan; Sharman Joshi; Soha Ali Khan; Esha Deol; Ayesha Takia; Riya Sen; Aarti Chhabria; Sophie Choudhary
- Cinematography: Johny Lal
- Edited by: Nitin Rokade
- Music by: Anu Malik
- Production company: Pooja Entertainment
- Distributed by: UTV Motion Pictures
- Release date: 3 November 2005
- Running time: 129 minutes
- Country: India
- Language: Hindi
- Budget: ₹150 million
- Box office: ₹204.9 million

Shaadi No. 1 (transl. Marriage No. 1) is a 2005 Indian Hindi-language comedy film directed by David Dhawan. The film stars Sanjay Dutt, Fardeen Khan, Zayed Khan, Sharman Joshi, Esha Deol, Ayesha Takia, Soha Ali Khan, Aarti Chabria, Riya Sen, and Sophie Chaudhary. It is a remake of the 2001 Kannada film Kothigalu Saar Kothigalu.

== Plot ==
Raj Mittal, Veer Saxena, and Aryan Kapoor are unhappy with their respective marriages even though they love their spouses. Their wives, Bhavana, Diya, and Sonia, are busy with their everyday lives, and their husbands feel ignored by them. Bhavana constantly uses religion as an excuse not to be intimate with her husband; Diya aspires to be an actress, shifting her away from her husband; and Sonia is a lawyer obsessed with doing cases every night without a single break. The three men try to commit suicide: Veer tries to hang himself on a tree but falls, Aryan attempts to drink rat poison, which he learns is expired, and Raj tries to get run over by a train. Still, their suicide plan does not work until they also meet Kothari, who is also trying to commit suicide because he had three businesses with his namesake that went bankrupt and lost a lot of money. The three men get a job as Kothari hires them to work for him. Soon, the three men come across Kothari's daughters: Madhuri, Rekha, and Dimple. It is not long before they are tempted by them. Unfortunately for them, Lucky Bhai is out to make their lives hell and expose them to their unassuming wives. The three men sign a contract as the three daughters have been lied to, and their wives are disappointed in them. Once again, the three friends commit suicide by standing on top of a ladder. Their wives witness their suicide attempt and apologize for neglecting them, causing them to postpone their deaths, but they are left hanging when they're about to leave. Kothari tries to cut the ladder with a chainsaw to get revenge for his daughters. Their wives come to save them but are left hanging, but Lucky Bhai saves them. The husbands, however, end up falling without a safe landing. Raj lands in a garbage bin, Aryan through electrical wires, and Veer through a dog van. Injured, Veer, Raj, and Aryan apologize to Lucky Bhai, as he feels awkward about saving people's lives; however, because the wives admire him a lot for helping them reunite with their prospective spouses, he continues to help out those in need.

== Cast ==
- Sanjay Dutt as Lakhwinder "Lucky" Singh Lakha
- Fardeen Khan as Raj Mittal
- Zayed Khan as Veer Saxena
- Sharman Joshi as Aryan Kapoor
- Esha Deol as Diya Saxena (Veer's wife)
- Ayesha Takia as Bhavana Mittal (Raj's wife)
- Soha Ali Khan as Advocate Sonia Kapoor (Aryan's wife)
- Aarti Chhabria as Rekha Kothari (Raj's girlfriend)
- Riya Sen as Madhuri Kothari (Aryan's girlfriend)
- Sophie Choudry as Dimple Kothari (Veer's girlfriend)
- Satish Shah as Kothari
- Rajpal Yadav as Mr. Y
- Suresh Menon as Panditji
- Ali Asgar as H.S Gulati
- Javed Khan as Marriage Registrar
- David Dhawan as himself (opening credits sequence)

== Music ==
Shaadi No. 1

Soundtrack album by Anu Malik
- Released: 6 September 2005
- Genre: Feature film soundtrack
- Label: Venus Records & Tapes

The film's music was composed by Anu Malik, with lyrics by Sameer and Shabbir Ahmed.

No.	Title	Singer(s)
1	"Chaand Ko Tod Doonga"	Abhijeet, Anuradha Sriram
2	"Jitne Channel TV Ke"	Sonu Nigam, Krishna Beura
3	"God Promise Dil Dola"	Rahul Vaidya, Shreya Ghoshal
4	"Hello Madam"	Rahul Vaidya, Prajakta Shukre
5	"Dil Nahi Tora Karte"	Shaan, Sunidhi Chauhan, Abrar-ul-Haq
6	"Aiyashi Aiyashi"	Shaan, DJ Aqeel, Sanjeev Rathod

=== Reception ===
Sukanya Verma of Rediff.com gave a negative review to the soundtrack, writing, "High on tepid tunes and smutty lyrics, Shaadi No 1 is at best a second-rate album from the No 1 team."

== Reception ==
Taran Adarsh of IndiaFM gave the film 2 out of 5, writing, "Shaadi No.1 has a huge star cast, but only a handful of names register an impact. Fardeen, Zayed and Sharman are efficient and what comes as a [pleasant] surprise is that both Fardeen and Zayed have handled the light moments with ease. As far as the leading ladies are concerned, Ayesha Takia and Esha Deol can be singled out. Sanjay Dutt's role might appeal mainly to the masses. Satish Shah is proficient." Kaveree Bamzai of India Today wrote, "In a film that seems to comprise the B-list of Bollywood and a strangely enlarged Sanjay Dutt, it is not surprising that the humour falls flat."
