= Shaadi Se Pehle =

- Directed by: Satish Kaushik
- Written by: Sanjay Chel
- Produced by: Subhash Ghai
- Starring: Akshaye Khanna; Sunil Shetty; Mallika Sherawat; Ayesha Takia; Aftab Shivdasani; Anupam Kher
- Cinematography: Johny Lal
- Edited by: Sanjay Verma
- Music by: Himesh Reshammiya
- Distributed by: Mukta Arts Ltd
- Release date: 7 April 2006
- Running time: 128 mins
- Country: India
- Language: Hindi
- Box office: ₹ 188.8 million

Shaadi Se Pehle (English: Before the Wedding or Before the Marriage) is a 2006 Indian Hindi-language romantic comedy film directed by Satish Kaushik and produced by Subhash Ghai. The film stars Akshay Khanna, Suniel Shetty, Ayesha Takia, Mallika Sherawat, and Aftab Shivdasani in lead roles. It was released on 7 April 2006.

The film is loosely inspired by Meri Biwi Ki Shaadi, starring Amol Palekar.

== Plot ==
Ashish and Rani meet at a cold drink stall, and over the next few days they fall in love. Rani introduces Ashish to her businessman dad, Tau, and mom; they unanimously frown upon this alliance, until Ashish promises to get a job, save enough money, buy a flat, etc. Ashish does get a small job with Izzat Papads; he then also begins to sell steroids out of the back of a van. He gets noticed by an ad firm owner and gets hired. Soon he has all the luxuries that he had always dreamed of. When the Bhallas come to know about this, they decide to welcome him as their son-in-law, and a lavish engagement party takes place. It is then Ashish finds out that he has cancer, and he begins to create misunderstandings between him and Rani. He tries becoming an alcoholic, but that is considered normal with the Bhalla family; he confesses to Rani that he has loved Sania, a model with ad agency, which is welcomed by Rani as being truthful and honest. But when Rani notices that he has put up Sania's photos all over his apartment, it is then that she breaks off the engagement. Ashish knows that Sania will not marry him, as she is a flirt. But when he is assigned to go to Malaysia with Sania, that is where he finds out that Sania is not quite a flirt but wants to marry him. She even introduces him to her brother, Anna, who instantly approves of the match. Now Anna inducts Ashish into the family business, which is extortion, and a stunned Ashish is trained to use guns and defend himself. When the time comes for marriage, Ashish confesses that he has cancer. An angered Anna summons Dr. Rustom, who in turn gives him a clean health check and confirms that Ashish had overheard a conversation about another patient and had misunderstood. While Ashish becomes happy, Rani and their friend Rohit are planning to get married, as Rohit always has feelings for Rani. Meanwhile, Sania also wants to get Ashish at any cost. In the climax of the car chase sequence, Ashish confronts Rani and confesses everything. It is then revealed that marriage with Rohit was a plan by Sania and Rohit, as they knew how much Ashish loved Rani. Finally, they unite, and the film ends on a happy note.

== Cast ==
- Akshaye Khanna as Ashish Khanna
- Suniel Shetty as Anna
- Aftab Shivdasani as Rohit Chopra
- Ayesha Takia as Rani Bhalla
- Mallika Sherawat as Sania
- Boman Irani as Dr. Rustam
- Rajpal Yadav as Kanpuri
- Anupam Kher as Mangal Pratap Bhalla
- Gulshan Grover as Luca (special appearance)
- Mita Vasisht as Ashish's sister
- Vijayendra Ghatge as Mr. Sumit Bhalla
- Kishori Shahane as Mrs. Shreya Bhalla
- Dinesh Hingoo as Undertaker, Cemetery caretaker.
- Greg Roman as Roan path Pandey

== Reception ==
The film grossed Rs.18,880,000 worldwide in its theatrical run against a total budget 7 Crore INR. The film was commercial success at the box office.

== Soundtrack ==
Shaadi Se Pehle

Soundtrack album by Himesh Reshammiya
- Released: 20 February 2006 (Digital Release); 7 April 2006 (Film)
- Recorded: 2006
- Venue: Mumbai
- Genre: Feature film soundtrack
- Language: Hindi
- Producer: Himesh Reshammiya

Himesh Reshammiya chronology
Banaras (2006)	Shaadi Se Pehle (2006)	Aksar (2006)

All song's lyrics by Sameer.

1. "Tutiya Ve" - Daler Mehndi
2. "Tutiya Ve" (remix - DJ Suketu - Arranged by Aks) - Daler Mehndi
3. "Bijuriya" - Alka Yagnik, Sukhwinder Singh
4. "Tere Liye" - Alka Yagnik, Udit Narayan
5. "Sache Aashiq" - Alka Yagnik, Sukhwinder Singh
6. "Mundeya" - Sunidhi Chauhan
7. "Ankhiyon Se Gal Kar Gayi" - Sukhwinder Singh, Sunidhi Chauhan, Sonu Nigam and Himesh Reshammiya
8. "Tere Liye" (remix) - Alka Yagnik, Udit Narayan
9. "Bijuriya" (remix) - Alka Yagnik, Sukhwinder Singh
10. "Mundeya" (remix) - Sunidhi Chauhan
11. "Ankhiyon Se Gal Kar Gayi" (remix) - Sukhwinder Singh, Sunidhi Chauhan, Sonu Nigam and Himesh Reshammiya
