= Blood Brothers (2007 Indian film) =

- Directed by: Vishal Bhardwaj
- Written by: Matthew Robbins
- Produced by: Bill Gates Foundation; Mira Nair
- Starring: Siddharth; Ayesha Takia; Pankaj Kapur; Pavan Malhotra
- Cinematography: Guillermo Navarro
- Edited by: Dattaraya Godhodke; Meghana Manchanda Sen
- Release date: 7 September 2007 (Toronto International Film Festival)
- Running time: 13 minutes
- Country: India
- Language: Hindi

Blood Brothers is a 2007 short film on HIV-AIDS directed by Vishal Bhardwaj. The film, written by Matthew Robbins, is one of the short films made on HIV-AIDS on behalf of the Bill Gates foundation. It was released as one of the four segments of the anthology film AIDS JaaGo (AIDS Awake), with Positive (2007 film).

Blood Brothers features Siddharth, Pavan Malhotra and Ayesha Takia in lead roles. Vishal chose cinematographer Guillermo Navarro to shoot his film. The movie premiered at the Toronto International Film Festival.

== Plot ==
The film revolves around a successful advertising campaign manager named Arjun Dutt. During a routine medical check-up, he discovers that he is HIV positive. He is totally devastated. Instead of accepting the truth and informing his pregnant wife and son, he runs away from his home and job.

While wandering like a beggar through the trains, he is robbed by a group of thugs who beat him up and leave him for dead, then a doctor takes him to his hospital. After coming to his senses, Siddharth tries to leave but is stopped by the doctor. The doctor conducts another test to find that Siddharth is actually HIV negative.

Siddharth returns to his family and while searching through his doctor's records discovers that another patient, also named Arjun Dutt, is HIV positive while he has always been HIV negative. He is now faced with the dilemma of revealing the truth to the blissfully unaware man, or remaining silent.

== Cast ==
- Siddharth – Arjun Dutt
- Ayesha Takia – Keya
- Pankaj Kapur – Dr. Bhootnath
- Pavan Malhotra – Arjun Dutt (Coach)
- Mukti Mohan

== Reception ==
A review for the Indian Journal for Medical Ethics stated, "There are sensitive portrayals by the lead actors, and Pankaj Kapur is a delight in a brief role as the gruff, straight-talking doctor."
