= Socha Na Tha =

2005 Indian film by Imtiaz Ali

- Poster
- Directed by: Imtiaz Ali
- Written by: Imtiaz Ali
- Produced by: Dharmendra
- Starring: Abhay Deol; Ayesha Takia
- Cinematography: Ravi Yadav
- Edited by: Imtiaz Ali; Shirish Kunder
- Music by: Sandesh Shandilya
- Production company: Vijayta Films
- Distributed by: Mukta Arts
- Release date: 4 March 2005
- Running time: 157 minutes
- Country: India
- Language: Hindi

Socha Na Tha (transl. Never Had Thought) is a 2005 Indian Hindi-language romantic comedy film directed by Imtiaz Ali, in his directorial debut. The film stars debutant Abhay Deol alongside Ayesha Takia. The film was released on 4 March 2005 and received positive reviews. The film was remade in Telugu as Premante Inthe (2006).

== Plot ==
Viren and Aditi are introduced by their families, but Viren refuses to marry because he wants to marry his girlfriend of three years, Karen. Viren's refusal creates tension between the families, as Aditi's aunt feels insulted. However Viren and Aditi meet by coincidence, bond quickly and Viren invites Aditi to accompany him to Goa – he wants her to find out if his girlfriend Karen loves him or not.

In Goa, the two of them grow closer and Karen notices this. Viren realises he has fallen in love with Aditi – however, preparations for his own wedding with Karen are already underway; things get more complicated as he fought very hard to get engaged to Karen because she's a Christian and Viren a Hindu. Despite this, he wants to marry Aditi who has fallen in love with him, too. However, Aditi rejects him out of respect for her aunt and uncle who have engaged her to Mahesh, Aditi's on-and-off boyfriend. After several conversations, Viren finally forgets Aditi, tells the truth to Karen and gets on with his life, feeling miserable.

On the day of Aditi's engagement, Karen meets her and asks her why she is not marrying Viren, now that Viren and Karen have broken up. Karen also tells her that Viren is miserable. Her cousin overhears this conversation and convinces Aditi to elope with Viren, which she does. They apologise to their families and are accepted.

== Cast ==
- Abhay Deol as Viren Oberoi
- Ayesha Takia as Aditi Sahani
- Apoorva Jha as Karen Fernandes
- Sohrab Ardeshir as Karen's father
- Salim Shah as Damodar Malhotra, Aditi's uncle
- Rati Agnihotri as Aditi's aunt
- Sandhya Mridul as Sonal, Aditi's first cousin
- Rajendranath Zutshi as Gopal, Aditi's first cousin
- Kamlesh Gill as Aditi's grandmother
- Suresh Oberoi as Mr. Nirmal Oberoi, Viren's father
- Lushin Dubey as Viren's mother
- Manish Choudhary as Naren, Viren's brother
- Ayesha Jhulka as Namita, Viren's sister-in-law
- Vijay Maurya as Shiva, Viren's friend

== Music ==
The film's music was composed by Sandesh Shandilya

Title	Singer(s)	Lyricist
"Zindagi"	Sonu Nigam, Sunidhi Chauhan, Lalit Bhushan	Irshad Kamil
"Abhi Abhi Mere Dil Mein"	Sonu Nigam, Sunidhi Chauhan, Kunal Ganjawala	Subrat Sinha
"Main Seedhe Saadhe Dhang Se"	KK	Irshad Kamil
"Mera Tumhara Kya Rishta Hai"	Sandesh Shandilya	Subrat Sinha
"Socha Na Tha"	Sadhana Sargam, Sandesh Shandilya	Irshad Kamil
"Na Sahi"	Sandesh Shandilya	Irshad Kamil
"O Yara Rab Rus Jane De"	Sonu Nigam, Sanjivani	Irshad Kamil

== Reception ==
Jaspreet Pandohar of BBC gave the film 3 out of 5 stars, and wrote, "Ali's dialogue and direction is equally engaging and avoids the kind of clichés commonly found in such sugarcoated Bollywood romances". Patcy N of Rediff.com wrote, "The script is good, and the dialogues are nice. The music includes light hummable songs which are choreographed well. Overall, Socha Na Tha is worth a watch." Kaveree Bamzai of India Today also gave the film a positive review, praising the characters and calling the film "surprisingly hip."
