= Sandesh Shandilya =

Indian composer and musician (born 1968)

- Born: 19 February 1968 (age 58); Agra
- Genres: Soundtrack, Film score
- Occupations: Composer, arranger
- Years active: 2001 – present

Sandesh Shandilya is an Indian film composer, musician, and singer who worked in Hind-language films. Having composed for over 20 film soundtracks, Shandilya is known for his compositions in Kabhi Khushi Kabhie Gham (2001), Chameli (2004), Socha Na Tha (2005) and Jab We Met (2007).

His 2001 album Piya Basanti won the International Viewers' Choice Award at the 2001 MTV Video Music Awards. His teacher, Ustad Sultan Khan along with K. S.Chithra sang the song Piya Basanti for him on this album.

He took basic music training from maestro Ustad Sultan Khan, who was a noted Sarangi player.

== Career ==
=== Debut and breakthrough with Kabhi Khushi Kabhie Gham (2001) ===
Shandilya made his Bollywood debut by collaborating with Jatin–Lalit and Aadesh Shrivastava on the music composition for Karan Johar's ensemble family drama Kabhi Khushi Kabhie Gham (2001). He composed four songs for the film's soundtrack: "Suraj Hua Maddham", "You Are My Soniya", "Deewana Hai Dekho", and "Vande Mataram," all of which became chartbusters. Upon its release, the soundtrack of Kabhi Khushi Kabhie Gham emerged as a major commercial success, selling 2.5 million units within 30 days. It became the best-selling album of the year in India, with 3.5 million soundtrack sales. Furthermore, Shandilya's compositions, along with the other songs in the soundtrack, received widespread critical acclaim, earning him a nomination for the Filmfare Award for Best Music Director (jointly with Jatin–Lalit and Shrivastava).

=== Later career (2002–present) ===
Shandilya next composed the music for films like Chameli (2004), Uuf Kya Jaadoo Mohabbat Hai (2004), Socha Na Tha (2005), Ek Chalis Ki Last Local (2007) and Jab We Met (2007), the last of which earned him high critical praise for composing the song "Aaoge Jab Tum".

== Discography ==
Year	Album	Other notes
1999	Pyar Ke Geet	Video features Arbaaz Khan, Malaika Arora Khan and Sung by Shubha Mudgal, Sukhwinder Singh
2000	Piya Basanti	Video features Nauheed Cyrusi and Donovan Wodehouse and Sung by Sultan Khan, K. S. Chithra
2006	Ustad & the Divas	A compilation album, composed by Sandesh Shandilya, that brings three singers, Chitra, Sunidhi Chauhan and Shreya Ghoshal, together with the Ustad Sultan Khan.

== Filmography ==
Year	Film	Other notes
2001	Kabhi Khushi Kabhie Gham	"You Are My Soniya" ,"Suraj Hua Madham","Dewaana Hai Dekho, Vande Mataram" (4 Songs)
2002	Agnivarsha: The Fire and the Rain	
2003	Chameli	
2003	Road	
2003	Rules: Pyaar Ka Superhit Formula	
2004	Uuf Kya Jaadoo Mohabbat Hai	
2005	Socha Na Tha	
2006	Iqraar: By Chance	
2007	Big Brother	
2007	Risk	
2007	Ek Chalis Ki Last Local	
2007	Jab We Met	Guest Composer for "Aoge Jab Tum"
2008	Meerabai Not Out	
2008	Rang Rasiya	
2009	Toss: A Flip of Destiny	
2009	Jashnn: The Music Within	
2009	Hum Phirr Milein Na Milein	
2009	Jag Jeondeyan De Mele	
2009	Sikandar	
2009	Do Paise Ki Dhoop, Chaar Aane Ki Baarish	
2010	Dus Tola	
2010	Tum Milo Toh Sahi	
2010	Road to Sangam	
2011	Love U...Mr. Kalakaar!	
2011	Yamla Pagla Deewana	
2012	Chaar Din Ki Chandni	
2012	Gattu	
2014	Satra Ko Shaadi Hai	
2014	Kya Dilli Kya Lahore	
2015	Time Out	
2015	Manjhi - The Mountain Man	
2016	Chalk n Duster	
2017	The Wishing Tree	
2017	Vodka Diaries	
2018	Daas Dev	
2019	Jhalki	
2020	Shikara	
2021	Oye Mamu!	
2023	Ho Ja Mukt	
2024	Swatantrya Veer Savarkar	
2024	Luv Ki Arrange Marriage	One song
