= Meri Biwi Ki Shaadi =

- Directed by: Rajat Rakshit
- Screenplay by: Mangesh Kulkarni; Rajat Rakshit
- Starring: Amol Palekar; Ranjeeta
- Cinematography: Sudarshan Naag
- Edited by: Waman Rao
- Music by: Usha Khanna
- Release date: 1979
- Country: India
- Language: Hindi

Meri Biwi Ki Shaadi is a 1979 Indian Hindi-language comedy film directed by Rajat Rakshit. The film was remade in Kannada as Nan Hendthi Maduve (2003). It also served as an inspiration behind the 2006 Hindi feature film Shaadi Se Pehle.

== Plot ==
When he experiences chest pains, hopeless hypochondriac Bhagwant checks into the hospital for a checkup and overhears his doctor discussing the diagnosis of a terminally ill patient with an associate. Assuming he is the one scheduled to die, he asks his friend to help him find a new husband for his wife Priya so he'll know she won't be alone once he's gone. He locates Priya's old college beau Fernandes. Meanwhile, Priya mistakes her husband's machinations for an attempt to cover up an extramarital affair and throws him out of the house.

== Cast ==
- Amol Palekar ... Bhagwant Kumar Bhartendu
- Ranjeeta Kaur ... Priya B. Bhartendu
- Ashok Saraf ... Advocate Venkat Vyas
- Nilu Phule ... Fernandes
- C. S. Dubey ... Banwari
- Nameeta Chandra (special appearance)

Uncredited

- Datta Bhat ... Doctor Bhat
- Raju Shrestha ... Bhagwant and Priya's Son

== Music ==
Music by Usha Khanna with lyrics by Ravindra Jain and Asad Bhopali.

Song	Singer
"Mujhse Shaam Suhani Poochhe Prem Kahani"	Mohammed Rafi, Asha Bhosle
"Zindagi Kaise Kategi Aap Se Rehkar Judaa"	Lata Mangeshkar
"Shyam Ki Baahon Mein Radhika Khele"	Usha Khanna
"Ram Dulari Maike Gayi"	Suresh Wadkar
