= Piya Basanti =

Studio album by Sultan Khan and K. S. Chithra Kishan Rajbhatt (Composer)
- Released: November 28, 2000
- Label: Sony Music

Piya Basanti is a Hindi album released on 28 November 2000. Sultan Khan and K. S. Chithra are the singers and Kishan Rajbhatt and Sandesh Shandilya are the composers. The album went on to become a huge success, winning an International Viewer Choice award from MTV. Recorded at Stage Sound Studios. Mix and Mastered by Kishan Rajbhatt

== Track listing ==
No.	Title	Singer(s)	Length
1.	"Piya Basanti Re"	Sultan Khan and K.S. Chithra	4:36
2.	"Surmayi Ankhen"	Sultan Khan and K.S. Chitra	5:47
3.	"Koi Pyaar"	Sultan Khan	5:32
4.	"Sham Dhale"	Sultan Khan and K.S. Chitra	4:32
5.	"Chale Re"	K.S. Chitra and Chorus (Sultan Khan - Additional Vocals)	4:56
6.	"Sawan Rut Ayi"	Sultan Khan and K.S. Chitra	5:39
7.	"Dhee More"	Sultan Khan	7:43
8.	"Rangeelo Rut"	Sultan Khan and K.S. Chitra	4:48

- The accompanying music video for "Piya Basanti" and "Surmayi Aankhen" featured newcomer acts Nauheed Cyrusi and Donovan Wodehouse.

== Awards ==
- Won International Viewer's Choice Award at the 2001 MTV Video Music Awards in the Hindi pop genre.
