= Government of Sharjah =

Government of the Emirate of Sharjah

Government of Sharjah حكومة الشارقة
- Emirate: Emirate of Sharjah
- Country: United Arab Emirates
- Website: ec.shj.ae

Head of Government
- Ruler of Sharjah: Sultan bin Muhammad Al-Qasimi

Executive Authority
- Main body: Sharjah Executive Council
- Appointed by: Ruler of Sharjah

Judicial Authority
- Court: Sharjah Court of Cassation

The Government of Sharjah (Arabic: حكومة الشارقة) is the subnational authority that governs the Emirate of Sharjah, one of the seven constituent monarchies which make up the United Arab Emirates. The executive authority and head of the government is the Ruler of Sharjah, Sheikh Sultan bin Muhammad Al-Qasimi. The Ruler of Sharjah appoints the Sharjah Executive Council, which is led by the crown prince of Sharjah and is responsible for the day-to-day management of Sharjah Government agencies such as the Sharjah Municipality and numerous other governing entities

== History ==
Sharjah is the third largest of the seven emirates that make up the United Arab Emirates. Sharjah was once part of a single emirate, along with Ras Al Khaimah, which was ruled by the Al Qasimi family. H.H. Sheikh Sultan bin Muhammad Al-Qasimi assumed the throne in 1972 - also known as "a scholar" in history, and was awarded a PhD (Doctorate of Philosophy) for his outstanding work. Under the guidance of H.H. Sheikh Sultan bin Mohammed Al Qasimi, Sharjah has progressed rapidly. Today, it is known as the cultural capital of the UAE. The discovery of the Mubarak oil field near Abu Musa Island in 1971 changed the fortunes of the emirate. In 1981, after Mubarak's reserves began to dwindle, the discovery of the offshore gas and liquid gas field of Al Sajaa gave a further boost to its revenues. Sharjah is also the first port in the Middle East to have fully equipped container facilities. Its large and attractive port at Khorfakkan provides key facilities for ships that do not need to enter the Gulf.

== Sharjah Executive Council ==
The Sharjah Executive Council of the Emirate of Sharjah, the supreme executive authority of the Emirate, It was established in October 1999 with the objective of assisting the Ruler in the discharge of his duties. To exercise his powers, formulate the general policy of the Emirate and implement its development It plans to raise social and economic standards in the emirate. It also tries to coordinate To serve the community and maintain momentum among all government departments and agencies Aspirations of Citizens and Residents of the Emirate of Sharjah. Under Act No. (2) of 1999, as amended, the Executive Council undertakes Number of activities. The members of the Executive Council include:

Number	Name	Position	Notable duties
1	His Highness Sheikh Sultan bin Mohammed bin Sultan Al Qasimi	Chairman	Deputy Ruler of Sharjah
2	His Highness Sheikh Abdullah bin Salem bin Sultan Al Qasimi	First Deputy Chairman	Deputy Ruler of Sharjah
3	His Highness Sheikh Sultan bin Ahmed Al Qasimi	Second Deputy Chairman	Deputy Ruler of Sharjah, Chairman of the Sharjah Media Council
4	Sheikh Mohammed bin Saud Al Qasimi	Council Member	Chairman of the Sharjah Finance Department
5	Sheikh Khaled bin Abdullah bin Sultan Al Qasimi	Council Member	Chairman of the Sharjah Seaports and Customs, Chairman of the Hamriyah Free Zone and the Sharjah International Airport Free Zone
6	Sheikh Salem bin Abdulrahman Al Qasimi	Council Member	Chairman of Ruler’s Office
7	Sheikh Khalid Bin Isam Bin Saqer Al Qassimi	Council Member	Chairman of the Civil Aviation Department
8	Sheikh Fahim Bin Sultan Bin Khalid Al Qasimi	Council Member	Executive Chairman of the Department of Government Relations
9	Sheikh Mohammed bin Humaid Al Qasimi	Council Member	Chairman of the Department of Statistics and Community Development
10	Sheikh Majid Bin Sultan Bin Saqer Al Qasimi	Council Member	Chairman of the Districts Affairs Department
11	His Excellency Rashid Ahmed Abdulla Bin Al Shaikh	Council Member	Chairman of Al Dewan Al Amiri
12	His Excellency Abdullah Mohammed AlOwais	Council Member	Chairman of the Department of Culture
13	His Excellency Dr. Engineer Khalifa Musabeh Ahmed Alteneiji	Council Member	Chairman of the Department of Agriculture and Livestock
14	Her Excellency Hana Saif Abdullah Al Suwaidi	Council Member	Chairperson of the Environment and Protected Areas Authority
15	His Excellency Abdulla Ali Al Mahyan	Council Member	Chairman of the Federal Affairs Office in Sharjah
16	His Excellency Ali Salim Al Midfa	Council Member	Chairman of the Sharjah International Airport Authority
17	His Excellency Engineer Ali Saeed Sultan Muhammad Bin Shaheen Al Suwaidi	Council Member	Chairman of the Department of Public Works (DPW)
18	His Excellency Khalid Jasim Saif Al Midfa	Council Member	Chairman of Sharjah Commerce and Tourism Development Authority
19	His Excellency Engineer Khaled Butti bin Butti Al Muhairi	Council Member	Chairman of the Department of Housing
20	His Excellency Dr. Engineer Yousif Khamis Mohamed Alathmane	Council Member	Chairman of Sharjah Roads and Transport Authority
21	His Excellency Adviser Dr. Mansour Mohammed Bin Nassar	Council Member	Chairman Of Sharjah Government Legal Department
22	His Excellency Dr. Abdelaziz Saeed Obaid Bin Butti Almheiri	Council Member	Chairman of Sharjah Health Authority
23	His Excellency Engineer Omar Khalfan bin Huraimel Al Shamsi	Council Member	Chairman of the Municipal Affairs Department
24	His Excellency Engineer Hamad Juma AlShamsi	Council Member	Chairman of Department of Town Planning and Survey
25	His Excellency Ali Ahmed Ali Abughazayain	Council Member	Chairman of Sharjah Fish Resources Authority
26	His Excellency Hamad Abdalla AlMahmoud	Council Member	Chairman of Sharjah Economic Development Department
27	His Excellency Abdullah Ibrahim Al Zaabi	Council Member	Chairman of the Department of Human Resources
28	His Excellency Major General Abdullah Mubarak bin Amir	Council Member	Commander-in-Chief of Sharjah Police
29	His Excellency Ahmed Ibrahim Hassan Al Meel	Council Member	Chairperson of the Sharjah Social Services Department

== See also ==
- House of Qasimi, the ruling family of Sharjah
- Ruler of Sharjah, head of the Emirate of Sharjah
- Politics of the United Arab Emirates
