= English-language Indian films =

English-language film industry in India

English-language Indian films date back to the silent film era. After the advent of sound, feature films in English almost disappeared.

== History ==
=== Silent era ===
In the 1920s, films directed by Franz Osten and Himansu Rai, including The Light of Asia and A Throw of Dice, could be considered English-language films because the intertitles were in English. With the advent of sound, directors such as Osten and Rai chose Hindi as the language, thus effectively bringing to a close this phase of English-language films made in India.

=== Crossover films ===
An attempt to make English talkies in India named Karma failed domestically in 1933.

Indian crossover films appeared in Indian cinema with international productions with Indian themes, starting with Merchant Ivory Productions' first venture, The Householder (1963), which has an India story, setting with an Indian cast, and included Shashi Kapoor, Leela Naidu, and Durga Khote. This was followed by a number of India-themed films largely propelled by Indian-born producer, Ismail Merchant. However, it took a while before an Indian director would commercially take up making films in the English language.

=== Indian productions ===
The first such film came at the peak of the Parallel cinema movement, when Aparna Sen directed 36 Chowringhee Lane (1981) to critical acclaim. Its lead actress, Jennifer Kendal was even nominated for a BAFTA Award. The genre was able to stand on its own with Dev Benegal's English, August (1994) which was widely accepted by urban audiences and became its first hit, drawing an audience of 20 million.

This paved the way for other directors to look at using English language as a viable medium, like Nagesh Kukunoor who made Hyderabad Blues (1998); Kaizad Gustad, Bombay Boys (1998); Homi Adajania, Being Cyrus (2006); and Rituporno Ghosh, whose The Last Lear (2008), starring Amitabh Bachchan as the lead, won the Best English Feature Award at National Film Award.

In the 2000s, Aparna Sen visited the genre again, and made two successive English features in Mr. and Mrs. Iyer (2002) and 15, Park Avenue (2005), which won a string of National Film Awards.

Meanwhile, film directors of Indian descent, such as Mira Nair, Deepa Mehta, and Gurinder Chadha, continued to make English-language films on Indian themes to international acclaim. This further opened up the genre, both creatively and commercially.

== List of films (partial) ==
Year	Title
1981	36 Chowringhee Lane
1986	On Wings of Fire
1988	The Perfect Murder
1989	In Which Annie Gives It Those Ones
1992	Electric Moon
1992	Miss Beatty's Children
1994	English, August
1996	Fire
1996	Kama Sutra: A Tale of Love
1996	The Making of the Mahatma
1998	Hyderabad Blues
1998	Bombay Boys
1999	Split Wide Open
1999	Rockford
2000	Dr Babasaheb Ambedkar
2001	American Desi
2001	Monsoon Wedding
2002	Mitr, My Friend
2002	Mr. and Mrs. Iyer
2002	Leela
2002	Mango Soufflé
2003	Stumble
2003	Freaky Chakra
2003	Five by Four
2004	Hyderabad Blues 2
2004	White Noise
2004	Bride and Prejudice
2004	Morning Raga
2005	15 Park Avenue
2005	Sins
2005	Water
2006	Being Cyrus
2006	Mixed Doubles
2006	Provoked
2007	Americanizing Shelley
2007	Parzania
2008	Via Darjeeling
2011	Delhi Belly
2012	Divorce Invitation
2014	Finding Fanny
2015	My Choice
2016	A Death in the Gunj
2022	Wonder Women

== See also ==
- National Film Award for Best English Feature Film
