= Elahe Hiptoola =

Indian actress and film producer

- Born: Mumbai
- Occupations: Film producer; actress
- Spouse: Vidyut Jaisimha (divorced)
- Partner: Nagesh Kukunoor
- Relatives: M. L. Jaisimha (former father-in-law)

Elahe Hiptoola is an Indian film producer and former actress. Her credits include producer of 3 Deewarein, Hyderabad Blues 2, Iqbal, Dor, and Dhanak.

== Early life and career ==
Elahe Hiptoola was born in Mumbai and resides in Hyderabad.

Hiptoola frequently works with producer Nagesh Kukunoor. Their collaborations include Hyderabad Blues, Rockford, 3 Deewarein, Bollywood Calling, Hyderabad Blues 2, Iqbal, Dor, Bombay to Bangkok, Aashayein, 8 x 10 Tasveer, Mod and Lakshmi.

In 2010, Hiptoola co-founded a cultural center called Lamakaan (a place without boundaries) in Hyderabad.

== Personal life ==
Hiptoola was married to Vidyut Jaisimha, a son of cricketer M. L. Jaisimha; they divorced later. Several media reports since the early 2000s have referred to her as director Nagesh Kukunoor's romantic partner.

== Filmography ==
As producer

Year	Title	Language(s)	Notes
1998	Hyderabad Blues	English	
1999	Rockford	English	
2001	Bollywood Calling	English	
2003	3 Deewarein	Hindi	
2004	Hyderabad Blues 2	English	
2005	Iqbal	Hindi; Sign language	
2006	Dor	Hindi; Urdu	
2008	Bombay to Bangkok	Hindi	
2009	8 x 10 Tasveer	Hindi	
2010	Aashayein	Hindi	
2011	Mod	Hindi; Urdu	
2014	Lakshmi	Hindi	
2016	Dhanak	Hindi	
2022	Modern Love Hyderabad	Telugu	Amazon Prime Video web series

As actor

Year	Title	Role	Notes
1998	Hyderabad Blues	Seema Rao	
2001	Bollywood Calling	Reporter	
2004	Hyderabad Blues 2	Seema Rao	
