= Chirantan Das =

Indian cinematographer

Chirantan Das is an Indian cinematographer associated with Tanu Weds Manu, Tere Naal Love Ho Gaya, Sanam Teri Kasam and Dhanak. Das, who did cinematography for 31 films, won the reputed Producers Guild Film Award for Best Cinematography, for Tanu Weds Manu (2011).

== Career ==
Chirantan is cinematographer of 31 movies including some critically acclaimed films like Sankat City (2009), Tanu Weds Manu (2011), Tere Naal Love Ho Gaya (2012), Dhanak (2015) and Sanam Teri Kasam (2012). Chirantan also worked as camera operator in the Bollywood.

== Filmography ==
Year	Title	Language	Notes
2002	Yeh Kya Ho Raha Hai?	Hindi	
2004	Stop!	Hindi	
2005	Dansh	Hindi	
2005	Anjaan	Hindi	
2007	1971	Hindi	
2007	Cape Karma	Hindi	
2007	Diva	Malay	
2007	Dus Kahaniyaan	Hindi	
2008	Mumbai Cutting	Hindi	
2009	Sankat City	Hindi	
2011	Tanu Weds Manu	Hindi	
2011	Mod	Hindi	
2012	Tere Naal Love Ho Gaya	Hindi	
2012	Matira Bandhana	Oriya	
2012	Ajab Gazabb Love	Hindi	
2014	Lakshmi	Hindi	
2015	Dhanak	Hindi	
2015	Tanu Weds Manu Returns	Hindi	
2016	Sanam Teri Kasam	Hindi	
2016	Santa Banta Pvt Ltd	Hindi	
2017	Commando 2	Hindi	
2018	Soorma	Hindi	
2019	Bard of Blood	Hindi	Netflix Series
2019	Pati Patni Aur Woh	Hindi	
2020	Shubh Mangal Zyada Saavdhan	Hindi	
2021	Bhavai	Hindi	
2022	Good Luck Sakhi	Telugu	
2022	Janhit Mein Jaari	Hindi	
2023	72 Hoorain	Hindi	
2023	Dono	Hindi	
