= Tapas Relia =

Indian music composer and producer

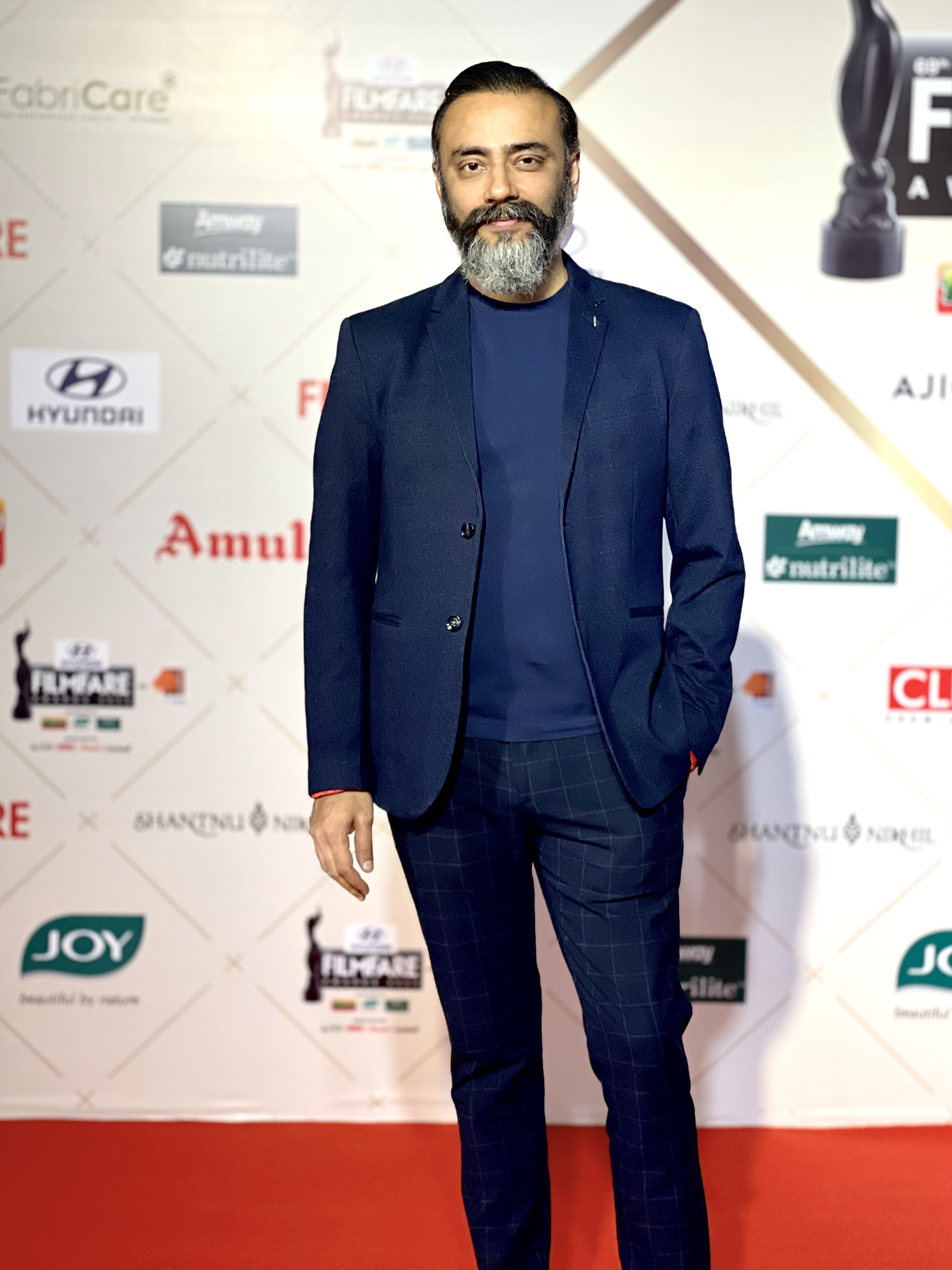

Background information
- Born: 11 August 1978 (age 48); Surat, Gujarat, India
- Genres: Film score, pop, folk, new age, Indian lassical, fusion
- Occupations: Composer, music producer, singer, lyricist
- Years active: 1996–present
- Label: Various
- Website: www.tapasrelia.com

Tapas Relia (Gujarati: તપસ રેલીયા; born 11 August 1978) is an Indian music composer and producer, known for his famous advertising campaigns for brands like Close-Up (toothpaste), Domino's Pizza, Amaron Batteries, IPL and Mahabharat. In Mumbai since 1996, he has also scored music for Bollywood films, including India's first major commercial animation film Hanuman and the recently released film Lakshmi, a film on child trafficking by acclaimed director Nagesh Kukunoor. Based in Mumbai, he works and operates from his own recording studio.

== Early life ==
Tapas Relia was born in Surat, Gujarat, to a Gujarati couple natively from Surat but living in Ahmedabad. He spent his entire childhood and teenage years in Ahmedabad and finished higher secondary school from St. Xavier's High School, Loyola Hall, Ahmedabad. In 1996 he moved to Mumbai to pursue further education and a career in music. He started learning western classical music, with piano as his principal instrument, and finished 7 grades of the Trinity Laban Conservatoire of Music and Dance in London. Simultaneously, he also experimented in the avenue of commercial music and taught himself music programming on synthesisers and sequencers. In the year 2000 he went to the US, and studied Composing for Film and Multimedia in New York University, New York City as a summer course, and returned to India in the same year, post its completion.

== Advertising career ==
He started composing and arranging music for small advertising jobs, primarily in the corporate and radio sector. His first major break in mainstream advertising came in the form of the jingle Kya Aap Closeup Karte Hain for Close-Up toothpaste. It was a huge success, and is considered to be one of the top jingles of all time even today. After that he went onto compose hundreds of Ads and other jingles for leading brands and agencies, including the Amaron Batteries campaign, Domino's Pizza Pizza Aaye Free campaign, Hero Honda (2010) campaign, IPL Mumbai Indians Anthem, and several other advertising campaigns, including ad campaigns and promos for leading Television shows like Mahabharata (2013) Kaun Banega Crorepati Season 3, Bigg Boss and MasterChef India.

== Bollywood career ==
After becoming a well recognised name in the advertising field, he was approached by Percept Picture Company to score the music for India's first animation film called Hanuman, which was based on the Indian God. The movie was declared a hit, and the music was well received critically and commercially. Following the success of Hanuman, Percept Picture Company offered him the sequel Return of Hanuman in the year 2007, which was directed by ace film maker Anurag Kashyap. Tapas won the 'Golden Cursor Animation Award' for best music. In the year 2008, Tapas was approached by the critically acclaimed film maker Nagesh Kukunoor to write music for his film Yeh Hausla, starring Karan Nath and Sameera Reddy in the lead. The movie which was produced by Percept Picture Company, never released though. He then scored the music for Nagesh Kukunoor’s Mod (2011) and followed up with the critically acclaimed Lakshmi (2014). His music in Lakshmi was hugely appreciated by critics and audiences alike. In 2012 he scored the background music for Vidhu Vinod Chopra’s Ferrari Ki Sawaari directed by Rajesh Mapuskar. Currently he is working on his next film with Nagesh Kukunoor called ‘Dhanak’, which is slated for a 2015 India Release.

== Discography ==
Year	Movie Title	Producer	Director	Credits	Ref.
2005	C U At 9	Milgrey Finance & Investments, Percept Picture Company	Marlon Rodrigues	Original Songs and Background Music	
2005	Hanuman	Silvertoons, Percept Picture Company, Sahara One Motion Pictures	V.G. Samant, Milind Ukey	Original Songs and Background Music	
2007	Return of Hanuman	Percept Picture Company, Toonz Animation India	Anurag Kashyap	Original Songs and Background Music	
2009	Fruit and Nut	Indian Films, Studio 18	Kunal Vijaykar	Original Songs and Background Music	
2010	Bumm Bumm Bole	Percept Picture Company, Sanjay Ghodawat Group	Priyadarshan	Original Songs. 1) Aashaon Ke Pankh; 2) Rang De	
2010	Toonpur Ka Super Hero	Big Screen Entertainment, Climb Media, Eros International	Kireet Khurana	Original Background Music	
2011	Kucch Luv Jaisaa	Cinema Capital Venture Fund, Sunshine Pictures See	Barnali Roy Shukla	Original Background Music	
2011	Mod	Kukunoor Movies, Shreya Entertainment	Nagesh Kukunoor	Original Songs and Background Music	
2012	Ferrari Ki Sawaari	Vinod Chopra Productions	Rajesh Mapuskar	Original Background Music	
2014	Lakshmi	Kukunoor Movies Production, SIC Productions, UV News Media & Communication	Nagesh Kukunoor	Original Songs and Background Music	
2015	The Threshold	Pushan Kriplani	Pushan Kriplani	Original Songs and Background Music	
2016	Dhanak	Manish Mundra (Drishyam Films)	Nagesh Kukunoor	Original Songs and Background Music	
2017	Dhantya Open (Gujarati)	Best Sellers Films	Ajay Phansekar	Original Songs and Background Music	
2017	The Test Case (Hindi)	ALTBalaji	Vinay Waikul	Background Music	
2019	City of Dreams Season 1	Nagesh Kukunoor	Nagesh Kukunoor	Title Song and Background Music	
2021	City of Dreams Season 2	Nagesh Kukunoor	Nagesh Kukunoor	Title Song and Background Music	
2022	Rudra: The Edge Of Darkness (web series) (Hindi)	BBC	Rajesh Mapuskar	Original Background Music	
2022	Modern Love Hyderabad	Elahe Hiptoola	Nagesh Kukunoor; Venkatesh Maha; Uday Gurrala; Devika Bahudhanam	Original Background Music & Songs for episode: Ep1: My unlikely pandemic dream partner - Original song “Madhitho Madhi” and Original Background Score Ep2: Fuzzy, purple and full of thorns - Original Background Score Ep3: Why did she leave me there? - Original Sing “Kannupapa” and Original Background Score Ep4: What clown wrote this script - Original Background Score Ep:5: About that rustle in the bushes - Original Background Score	
2023	Goldfish	Amit Saxena	Pushan Kripalani	Original Background Music	
2023	City of Dreams Season 3	Nagesh Kukunoor	Nagesh Kukunoor	Title Song and Background Music	
2025	The Hunt - The Rajiv Gandhi Assassination Case	Nagesh Kukunoor, Sameer Nair	Nagesh Kukunoor	Original Background Music	

== Singles ==
Title	Year	Ref.
Yakeen Rakh	2020	
