= Modern Love Hyderabad =

Indian anthology television series

- Official poster
- Genre: Romance; Drama; Anthology
- Based on: Modern Love by John Carney
- Written by: Nagesh Kukunoor; Shashi Sudigala; Bahaish Kapoor
- Directed by: Nagesh Kukunoor; Venkatesh Maha; Uday Gurrala; Devika Bahudhanam
- Starring: Nithya Menen; Abijeet; Aadhi Pinisetty; Ritu Varma; Malvika Nair; Suhasini Maniratnam; Revathi; Naresh; Ulka Gupta; Komalee Prasad; Naresh Agastya; Rag Mayur; Karthikesh
- Composers: Songs: M. M. Keeravani; Tapas Relia; Vivek Sagar; Kaala Bhairava; Smaran; Score: Smaran
- Original language: Telugu
- No. of seasons: 1
- No. of episodes: 6

Production
- Executive producer: John Carney
- Producer: Elahe Hiptoola
- Production location: Hyderabad
- Cinematography: Sangram Giri; Aditya Javvadi; Sai Prakash Ummadisingu
- Editors: A. Sreekar Prasad; Ravi Teja Girijala; Harishankar Tamminana
- Production company: SIC Productions

Original release
- Network: Amazon Prime Video
- Release: 8 July 2022

Modern Love Hyderabad is an Indian Telugu-language romantic anthology television series produced by Elahe Hiptoola and directed by Nagesh Kukunoor, Venkatesh Maha, Uday Gurrala and Devika Bahudhanam. It stars Nithya Menen, Abijeet, Aadhi Pinisetty, Ritu Varma, Malvika Nair, Suhasini Maniratnam, Revathi, Naresh, Ulka Gupta, Naresh Agastya, and Komalee Prasad in the lead roles.

Modern Love Hyderabad is set in Hyderabad and is based on the American television series Modern Love which itself is based on the weekly column of the same name published by The New York Times. The series premiered on 8 July 2022 on Amazon Prime Video to positive reviews from critics.

== Cast ==
My Unlikely Pandemic Dream Partner	Fuzzy, Purple, and Full of Thorns	Why Did She Leave Me There?
Nithya Menen as Noori Hussain; Revathi as Meharunnisa, Noori's mother; Krishna Teja as Prakash, neighbour of Noori; Mayank Parak as Hussain, auto driver; Pradeep Rudra as Vinay, Noori's colleague	Aadhi Pinisetty as Dr. Uday; Ritu Varma as Renuka "Renu"; C. V. L. Narasimha Rao as Renuka's father; Geetha Daasyam as Renuka's mother; Sree. M. Nivaas as Uday's father; Tripura. K as Uday's mother; Zainab Ali Sajjad as Naznim, Renuka's best friend; Tejaswini Bhattaru as Preeti, Rahul's wife; Renuka's ex-boyfriend	Suhasini Maniratnam as Gangamma; Naresh Agastya as Rohan Durvraj 'RD'/'Rohan' AKA Ramulu.
What Clown Wrote This Script?	About That Rustle in the Bushes	Finding Your Penguin
Abijeet Duddala as Ashwin; Malvika Nair as Vandana Bharadwaj 'Vinnie'; Sanjay Swaroop as Vinnie's father; Pramodini as Vinnie's mother; Bindu Chandramouli as Sakshi; Harshini Koduru as Simran; Silpa Chakravarthy as Model; Seeram Ramachandra Murty ( Maddy ) as Rohit	Naresh as K. Sreedhar; Ulka Gupta as Sneha; Anirudh Pavithran as Jai, Sneha's love interest; Divyavani as Jyothika, Sreedhar's wife; Kruthika Roy Theresa as Raashi, Sneha's colleague; Eashaan Gandakam as Balu, a tech enthusiast who helps Sreeder spy on Sneha	Komalee Prasad as Indu; Rag Mayur as Tarun, Indu's one-side lover; Priyanka Kolluru as Subha, Indu's best friend; Pawani Karanam as Ayesha; Bhavana Sagi as Srilekha; Karthikesh as Karn; Santhosh Balakrishna as Vivek, Indu's ex-lover; Srinivas Bogireddy as Narasimha, Indu's father; Ankith Koyya as Aadi (cameo appearance)

== Episodes ==
The first season of the series has six episodes.

Series	Episodes	Originally released
1	6	8 July 2022

No.	Title	Directed by	Written by	Original release date
1	"My Unlikely Pandemic Dream Partner"	Nagesh Kukunoor	Unknown	8 July 2022
2	"Fuzzy, Purple, and Full of Thorns"	Nagesh Kukunoor	Unknown	8 July 2022
3	"Why Did She Leave Me There?"	Nagesh Kukunoor	Unknown	8 July 2022
4	"What Clown Wrote This Script?"	Uday Gurrala	Unknown	8 July 2022
5	"About That Rustle in the Bushes"	Devika Bahudhanam	Unknown	8 July 2022
6	"Finding Your Penguin"	Venkatesh Maha	Unknown	8 July 2022

== Production ==
Modern Love Hyderabad was filmed between September and November 2021. Speaking to The Hindu Elahe Hiptoola states that producing an anthology for a digital platform was not very different from producing a film. "Ultimately, it is like organising a baraat every day. No one will tell you that the food is good, but someone will complain namak kam tha (the salt was less). For cinema, my task begins with raising funds and ends with finding distributors. In this case, Prime Video gave me enough freedom and also gently reminded me of regulations when needed. For example, I did not know that we cannot shoot with kids beyond 7p.m. I had not followed such rules during the making of Rockford or Dhanak. This was a learning experience." Director Uday Gurrala told News18: "In my story titled ‘What Clown Wrote This!’, you will see universal themes but from a distinctly Telugu lens and that's what makes it so interesting. We’ve delved deep into the psyche of the Telugu man (and woman) to understand what makes today's generation tick".

== Release ==
The series was released on Amazon Prime Video on 8 July 2022.

== Reception ==
Janani K of India Today rated the series 2.5 out of 5 stars and wrote "The show aims to tug at our heartstrings, but settles for more melodrama". Saibal Chatterjee of NDTV rated the series 2.5 out of 5 stars and wrote "Revathy, outstanding as ever, conveys a range of emotions with mere glances and gestures. Nithya Menen is luminous".

== See also ==
- Modern Love Mumbai, Mumbai chapter of Modern Love
- Modern Love Chennai, Chennai chapter of Modern Love
