= Dor (film) =

- Theatrical release poster
- Directed by: Nagesh Kukunoor
- Written by: Nagesh Kukunoor; Mir Ali Hussain (dialogues)
- Screenplay by: Nagesh Kukunoor
- Story by: Nagesh Kukunoor (adaptation); T. A. Razzaq (original)
- Based on: Perumazhakkalam by Kamal
- Produced by: Elahe Hiptoola
- Starring: Ayesha Takia; Gul Panag; Shreyas Talpade; Girish Karnad; Uttara Baokar; Prateeksha Lonkar
- Cinematography: Sudeep Chatterjee
- Edited by: Sanjib Datta
- Music by: Salim–Sulaiman
- Distributed by: Sahara One Motion Pictures; Percept Picture Company; Eros International (Overseas)
- Release date: 22 September 2006
- Running time: 123 minutes
- Country: India
- Languages: Hindi; Urdu

Dor (Hindi pronunciation: [ɖoːɾ]; transl. String) is a 2006 Indian Hindi-language drama film written and directed by Nagesh Kukunoor and features Ayesha Takia, Gul Panag and Shreyas Talpade as the lead actors. The film is an official remake of the Malayalam film, Perumazhakkalam (2004) and was well received by the critics after its release on 22 September 2006.

Dor, which was produced by Elahe Hiptoola, had cinematography by Sudeep Chatterjee and editing by Sanjib Datta. For a film that had Hindi as the predominant language with a sporadic use of Urdu, Salim–Sulaiman composed the background score.

The story is about two women who come from different backgrounds and how fate brings them together. Meera (Ayesha Takia), a young woman who becomes a widow shortly after marriage, is trapped by tradition. Zeenat (Gul Panag), on the other hand, faces the daunting task of saving the life of her husband, who is on trial for murder. A bahuroopiya (Shreyas Talpade) helps her reach Meera, who holds the "string" to Zeenat's hope. The companionship that develops between Meera and Zeenat results in redemption for both.

== Plot ==
Zeenat is an independent Muslim woman who lives in Himachal Pradesh. She marries her boyfriend, Amir Khan, who then leaves for Saudi Arabia to work.

Meera is a traditional Rajasthani Hindu woman who leads a life in accordance with custom. This includes her arranged marriage into a traditional Rajasthani family, as well as her daily household chores. Her husband, Shankar, also works in Saudi Arabia. He regularly sends his wages home to support his family, including his father, Randhir Singh, his mother and his grandmother. When the remittances stop and there is no correspondence from Shankar, Meera learns that he was killed in a freak accident allegedly caused by his Muslim roommate. She is devastated by the news.

The ceremonies that turn her into a widow are emotionally draining. Her exuberance and vivaciousness are stifled. The rest of the family direct their frustration at losing their sole provider towards her, blaming her for bringing bad luck to the family.

Then Zeenat hears that her husband has been arrested for murdering his roommate in Saudi Arabia. Amir is scheduled to be executed. An Indian officer explains that, under Saudi law, a criminal can be released if the wife of the victim forgives them. Armed only with a photograph of Shankar and Amir, Zeenat sets out to find Meera. En route, she meets a behrupiya with a talent for mimicry and the performing arts. However, he proves to be a petty con man when he tricks Zeenat and steals her belongings. When Zeenat gets into trouble, however, he returns to rescue her, using his talents. He shows empathy when she tells him her story and offers to help. After making some educated guesses, they reach Jodhpur and identify the Singh haveli. When Zeenat asks the Singh family to forgive Amir for his mistake, they become angry and drive her away.

Thinking that befriending Meera might further her cause, Zeenat approaches her at the temple she visits daily. However, she is too afraid to tell Meera the truth and does not reveal who she is. Nevertheless, they become good friends and spend most of their time together. Their friendship brings out the missing part of each other's personalities. Meera gets a glimpse of freedom, which helps her to break free from tradition and gives her a new perspective on life.

The Singh family owes money to Chopra, a local factory owner. When Randhir asks for more time to repay the debt, Chopra makes him an offer: he will forgive the debt in exchange for Meera. Randhir accepts. When news of the death sentence arrives, Zeenat feels compelled to tell Meera the truth. Meera is hurt by the fact that their friendship was based on false pretences, and she refuses to sign the maafinama (statement of forgiveness). She makes it clear that she wants to hurt her husband's murderer, even though it was an accident, because she is suffering in her new, veiled life.

Zeenat is hurt, but she accepts it as fate and decides to leave. However, Meera has a change of heart due to her disillusionment at Randhir's willingness to 'sell' her to Chopra. She hurries to the railway station, where she gives Zeenat the signed statement of forgiveness. Zeenat extends her hand from the train and Meera grabs it, climbing aboard and running away from the only life she has ever known.

== Cast ==
- Ayesha Takia as Meera
- Shreyas Talpade as Bahuroopiya
- Gul Panag as Zeenat
- Girish Karnad as Randhir Singh
- Nagesh Kukunoor as Chopra
- Prateeksha Lonkar as Gowri Singh
- Uttara Baokar as Dadima, Meera's grandmother-in-law.
- Aniruddha Jatkar as Shankar Singh, Meera's husband
- Rushad Rana as Amir Khan, Zeenat's husband
- Vishal Malhotra as Meera's brother-in-law

== Production ==
=== Pre-production ===
The story of Dor began when Nagesh Kukunoor was attending the International Film Festival of India in November 2005. During the festival, he had hinted to a journalist that he began writing his next script. He confirmed this in another interview that after watching Perumazhakkalam (2005), whose story is based on a newspaper article, at the Film Festival, he decided to make his own version of the film. After purchasing the story rights from Kamal, director of Perumazhakkalam, he wanted to remake it in a different way. Through his story, he wanted to emphasize the protagonists' ordeal while in isolation in the form of a visual drama. However, acknowledgments to Perumazhakkalam or its makers were not provided in the credits.

Kukunoor announced the news about film making in early March 2006 and suggested of its release in August 2006. He conceptualized the film in thirds: the first and third for the lead characters and the second for the supporting one. However, Kukunoor said that all his films, at the core, have "the human element – the simplicity of the basic emotions that bind us all." Since the backdrop of the film was to be Rajasthan, he had been there and did the necessary research so as to better portray the place and characters.

=== Locations and casting ===
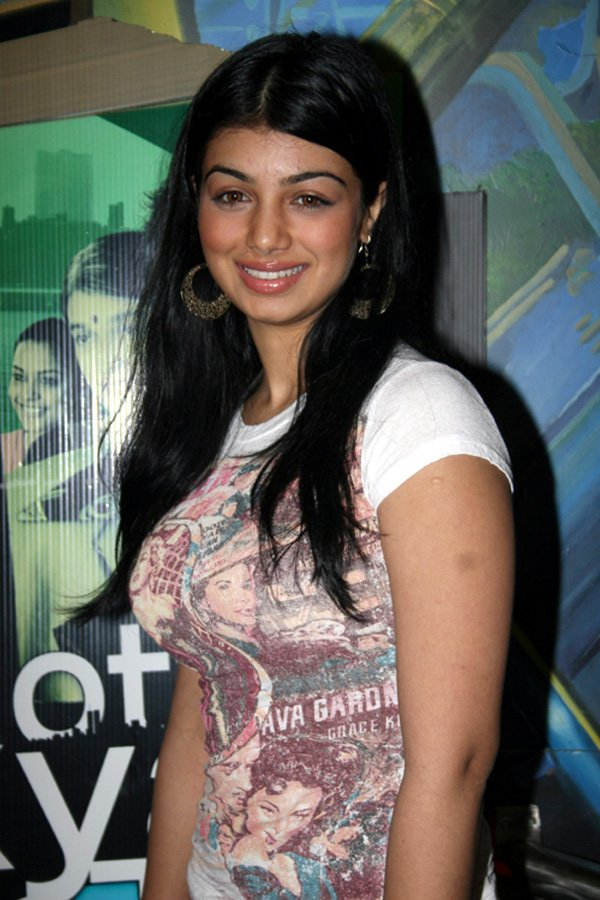
Ayesha Takia's performance of Meera was critically acclaimed

Kukunoor had not visited Rajasthan or Himachal Pradesh before, but he felt that he would find great locations there. Salooni in Chamba district is considered for shooting in Himachal Pradesh. In spite of this geographical inexperience, all went as per the plans while shooting in Rajasthan. However, minor modifications in the script were allowed for the surroundings. Though Panag had been in Rajasthan, she felt the scorching summer heat unbearable at times. She liked the only continuous shooting schedule and said that it provided consistency in look and performance. In Himachal, it was slightly different when the crew had hard time framing the mountains correctly. On seeing the captured frames, they shifted all the interior shots to outside. Filming was completed in 37 days in several locations of Rajasthan. Since most of the old palaces in Rajasthan have been converted into hotels, the crew stayed at a palace resort called Manwar. They resided at a palace resort in Pokhran, while filming was done at Mehrangarh Fort in Jodhpur. Kukunoor, after completion of the shooting, said that it was his most challenging film as it involved a real-life story.

Gul Panag was impressed with Kukunoor's previous film, Rockford (1999) and her constant correspondence with him fetched her the role of Zeenat. Kukunoor felt that Panag had characteristics of someone who was lean and fit, good height, large frame, and with an appropriate skin tone. After a successful audition, she was chosen for the character that she felt was a difficult one to portray. Critiquing the actress with "I see urgency, pain but no sadness" and "I see anger and vulnerability but no guilt", the director pushed Panag to her limits. She felt that Kukunoor was such a man of conviction that he constantly forgot to eat and this once caused him a stomach infection. Gul Panag, on the other hand, said that her role was very multi-dimensional, multi-layered and hence it was quite tough to play the character. She said that Kukunoor helped her in defining her character with ease and said, "Nagesh looked at the minutest detail and was an immense support to me as an actor." However, Dor's executive producer, Elahe Hiptoola lent her voice for Panag in the film.

It was in Socha Na Tha (2004) that Kukunoor noticed Ayesha Takia and until then he assumed her to be a glamour doll. After getting convinced about her acting skills, she was roped in for the character of Meera. Takia said that though her character emotionally drained her, it was not tough to portray and that she could learn a lot about life. She further said that, "Dor was indeed an exciting challenge for the actor in me. I am happy that it was also a very exciting role, which not many actors get to portray at such a young age." She said that with Dor, she was not only in the film industry for glamour, but also for her acting prowess. While filming, Kukunoor bonded so well with Takia that he requested her to be his sister. Since she did not have a brother in real life, she got quite emotional with Kukunoor's brotherly proposal. This affection eventually solemnized in the form of a rakhi symbolically.

When Kukunoor was thinking of a character full of disguises, he first came up with an old man. When the thought of a scene with the three major characters dancing in the dunes came up, he realized that an older character could not realistically dance in the desert. He immediately felt that Shreyas Talpade, whom he knew of knowing mimicry, could be used for bahuroopiya. Kukunoor, who worked previously with Girish Karnad, said that he was the strength for the film and added that he found him a good actor and a good human being. Talpade, who previously featured as the title character in Kukunoor's Iqbal (2005), observed the bahuroopiyas in Rajasthan and incorporated their dialect, accent, and their body language for his character. About Kukunoor, he said that, "though one tends to go overboard as an actor most of the times, the way he handles the character as a director, Nagesh makes you feel that it is very simple for you to delineate the character." Through his character of a bahuroopiya, Talpade was required to perform mimicry. While he was good at mimicry in college, it was during the filming of Iqbal, Kukunoor noted this talent of his and thus Dor came into Talpade's hands. About his co-actors, he said that it was refreshing to work with Panag and Takia despite the scorching heat of 45 °C (113 °F). Kukunoor first wrote the screenplay in English, then had it translated to Hindi.

== Soundtrack ==
Dor

Soundtrack album
- Released: 26 August 2006
- Genre: Feature film soundtrack
- Length: 34:35
- Language: Hindi
- Label: Universal Music India

The soundtrack, which was composed by Salim–Sulaiman and the lyrics by Mir Ali Hussain, was released on 26 August 2006 with a typical and traditional Rajasthani flavour.

One review about the soundtrack said that, "this is no ordinary album and will be preferred by musical elites. Infused with classical music and Rajasthani folk music, it is a good quality album coming out of Salim-Sulaiman. But the shortcoming comes in the form that this is not the kind of music that'll please every ear." Another review, in a similar tone, said that the album "works only for those who are either followers of classical music or enjoy hearing songs with a Rajasthani folk music base. There is no doubt that composers good quality throughout, but overall the album caters only to a niche audience." About the background score, Kukunoor said that "to put soaring music to give it a larger-than-life film image was pretty difficult". Despite this worry, with Salim–Sulaiman composing the music, he was happy with the way it was composed according to the sequence. Shreya Ghoshal, Karsan Sagathia, Sunidhi Chauhan and a Pakistani singer, Shafqat Amanat Ali were among those who sang the songs. While releasing the soundtrack, Kukunoor said that Salim–Sulaiman and he tried make songs that "stood out from the clutter and something that was different from the item numbers or the boring love ballads."

No.	Title	Singer(s)	Length
1.	"Allah Hoo Allah Ho"	Salim Merchant	04:50
2.	"Expression of Love"	Trilok Gurtu	05:44
3.	"Imaan Ka Asar"	Sunidhi Chauhan, Shreya Ghoshal	04:12
4.	"Kesariya Balam"	Karsan Sagathia	06:05
5.	"Piya Ghar Aaya"	Pratichee	05:39
6.	"Theme Music"	Salim Merchant	01:48
7.	"Yeh Honsla"	Shafqat Amanat Ali	04:39
8.	"Yeh Honsla" (Sad)	Shafqat Amanat Ali	01:33

== Release and reception ==
=== Critical response ===
The Telegraph said in its review, "When you first watch Nagesh Kukunoor's impressively shot Dor, you want to simply applaud it as good cinema. Whether it's Ayesha's award-worthy performance or Shreyas' amusing moments, the credit marks pile up in favour of the director who has made engaging cinema." The Times of India said:

Dor makes a strong feminist statement without being strident or shouting slogans. And all along, the riveting friendship between the two polarized women and the events that bring them together, keep tugging at your heart. Shreyas Talpade proves that (his previous film), Iqbal was no accident and Gul Panag gives one of the most convincing portrayals of her career. But, it is Ayesha Takia who simply blows your breath away. Her journey from joyous subjugation – where she is content to dance before her husband and be at the beck and call of her in-laws – to silent emancipation is absolutely endearing.

About the technical department, The Hindu said:

"There is this one scene when the director cuts from Zeenat (Gul Panag) trying to fix her house literally from the outside, perched on a ladder, with a hammer in hand, to Meera (Ayesha Takia) inside the house and behind a veil. The play of such visual metaphors throughout gives the film a world-class feel, the kind of stuff you usually see in Indian cinema."

Another review from The Telegraph says:

"Sudeep Chatterjee's cinematography is excellent. He composes and constructs stylised but simple images which don't scream for attention, but unassumingly add up to create the film's striking overall visual design."

While writing about the plot and the picturization, Rediff.com concluded:

"The script is engaging; the dialogues entertaining, witty and yet quite profound. Every scene seems to have been well etched out. The character sketches are strong and the characters are inspiring but not patronizing. The script, the story and the characters take the spotlight and the sets, though picturesque add to the plot instead of overshadowing it."

Taran Adarsh, while writing about the chances of its commercial success, said, "Dor is a well-made film that caters to those with an appetite for qualitative cinema. Awards and glowing critical acclaim, yes, it has the power to win it. But, box-office rewards and a mandate from the aam junta (common man) will elude it. The lethargic pacing will also go against it."

=== Reception and awards ===
As per the reviews, the film could not capture much appeal at the theatres. In Kolkata, theatre officials withdrew Dor from screening one week after its theatrical release. The reason cited for this withdrawal was due to many simultaneous releases such as the films Woh Lamhe and Snakes on a Plane. However, commercial success notwithstanding for these films, Dor was brought back to the screens. Following this, Dor was screened at the annual Indo-American Arts Council Film Festival and the Atlanta Indo-American Film Festival.

Along with nominations for cinematography, dialogues, lyrics and supporting actor (for Shreyas Talpade), the film won the critics award for Ayesha Takia and Gul Panag at the 2007 Zee Cine Awards. At the annual Star Screen Awards, Talpade and Takia won the best actor in a comic role and critics' choice for best actress awards respectively along with other nominations. At Stardust Awards ceremony, Takia and Panag won awards for their performances. Takia further won the Best Actress Award at the Bengal Film Journalists' Association Awards. Karthik Saragur and Komal Sahani were nominated for Best Costume Design at 52nd Filmfare Awards.

== Home media ==
=== DVD ===
The DVD version of the film was released on 20 October 2006. The DVD release, which was distributed by Eros Entertainment, is available in 16:9 Anamorphic widescreen, Dolby Digital 5.1 Surround, progressive 24 FPS, widescreen and NTSC format. With a runtime of 147 minutes, the DVD has a provision for English subtitles.

== See also ==
- Perumazhakkalam
