= Lakshmi (2014 film) =

- Theatrical release poster
- Directed by: Nagesh Kukunoor
- Written by: Nagesh Kukunoor
- Produced by: Satish Kaushik; Pramod Sharma; Elahe Hiptoola; Nagesh Kukunoor
- Starring: Monali Thakur; Shefali Shah; Ram Kapoor; Satish Kaushik; Nagesh Kukunoor
- Cinematography: Chirantan Das
- Edited by: Sanjib Datta
- Music by: Tapas Relia
- Production companies: Kukunoor Movies; UV News Media and Communication; Pen Studios
- Distributed by: Pen Studios
- Release dates: 13 January 2014 (Palm Springs); 21 March 2014 (India)
- Running time: 104 minutes
- Country: India
- Language: Hindi

Lakshmi (Hindi pronunciation: [lək.ʂmiː]) is a 2014 Indian Hindi-language biographical social problem film written and directed by Nagesh Kukunoor. It features Monali Thakur in the title role, alongside Shefali Shah, Ram Kapoor, Satish Kaushik, and Kukunoor. The film deals with the harsh realities of human trafficking and child prostitution, which continue behind closed curtains in rural areas of India.

The film received international recognition when it won Best Film - Mercedes Benz Audience Award, for Best Narrative at the Palm Springs International Film Festival on 13 January 2014. It was earlier expected to release on 17 January 2014, but got delayed due to censorship issues. The film was released on 21 March 2014. The film was screened as an official selection at the Toronto Reel World, Washington DC, New York Indian, and Melbourne Indian Film Festivals. It would open the 16th London Asian Film Festival in June 2014.

== Plot ==
Lakshmi, a 14-year-old girl, is kidnapped from her village by Chinna (Nagesh Kukunoor) and brought to Hyderabad. She is taken to the home of Chinna's elder brother and boss, Reddy, where she first naively assumes the role of a domestic worker, helping the much older existing maid Amma. However, she is later raped by Reddy. The next day, Chinna takes Lakshmi to a brothel managed by Jyothi, who is both a reassuring and oppressive figure to the girls. After her first night, Lakshmi manages to run away to a nearby police station, but her complaint falls on deaf ears since Reddy has paid off the local police force. Thrown in this horrific, inhuman world, she survives with the help of the other girls and her own will to never give in. She forms a close friendship with her roommate at the brothel Suvarna, who walks her through the realities of life.

It is revealed that Jyothi works for Reddy in order to fund her daughter's college education and plans to retire as soon as she graduates. At the brothel, Lakshmi meets Uma, a kindhearted woman who periodically brings the girls sanitary items, condoms and sweets. While servicing a client at his home, Lakshmi tries to escape but is caught and punished by Chinna. She develops an infection due to the injury and is nursed by Jyothi and Survana, but is ultimately forced to work again, when a client demands a young girl. The client turns out to be an undercover agent Mohan who operates with the help of Jyothi and Uma, and Reddy and Chinna are arrested. The girls are taken to a women's shelter, where Lakshmi recovers, but the case against Reddy stagnates since no one is willing to testify against him. The brothel is reopened and one by one, the women slowly return, until Lakshmi is the only one left at the shelter.

Against all odds, Lakshmi shows courage where everybody else fails. Her lawyer is in retirement due to having previously suffered a nervous breakdown, and initially refuses to take the case. He believes that Lakshmi will not be able to withstand the immense stress of the case, since she is the only witness against a powerful trafficking syndicate. Resisting all pressure - violent threats, coercion and bribes, she stands up in court. Her testimony reveals that her father sold her to a local politician, who in turn sold her to Reddy. At the brothel, Chinna beats and tortures Jyothi as punishment for her betrayal, and also reveals to Jyothi's daughter that she works there. Later that night, Jyothi castrates Chinna and slits her own wrists, resulting in them both bleeding to death. The trial results in a landmark judgement in India, succeeding in putting the traffickers behind bars.

== Cast ==
- Monali Thakur as Bangaru Lakshmi
- Shefali Shah as Jyoti
- Ram Kapoor as Avinash, Lakshmi's Advocate
- Satish Kaushik as Ram Reddy
- Nagesh Kukunoor as Chinna
- Gulfam Khan as Corporator Radha
- Asha Saini as Suvarna
- Vibha Chibber as Amma
- Vinita Joshi Thakkar as Asha
- Priyankaa Vir as Uma didi
- Ramkrishna Shenoy as Mohan
- Sumit Sharma as Opposition Lawyer
- Raju as Bangaru Raju, Lakshmi's father
- Subhash Gupta as Dr Murli
- Suresh Kumar as Judge
- Karan Pamnani as Inspector
- Tejeswani Vellicharla as Police woman

== Production ==
Director Nagesh Kukunoor was inspired to make the film after visiting some NGOs in India, where he met victims of human trafficking.

The film is produced by both Nagesh Kukunoor, his long-time collaborator Elahe Hiptoola who worked with him on all his films since Hyderabad Blues, and also by renowned actor Satish Kaushik. Kaushik stated the marketing campaign for the film was geared towards keeping "in tandem with the theme of the movie." The producers are planning to have private screenings of the film for Non-Governmental Organizations to promote awareness of the heinous crimes depicted in the film. They also hoped the film would be backed and sponsored by actor Salman Khan, who runs his own personal NGO called Being Human.

Kukunoor initially sought a 14-year girl as the lead but later dropped the idea of casting a minor. He later auditioned Monali Thakur for the same. The film was shot in 22 days on location, entirely in Hyderabad.

The trailer for the film was released on 21 October 2013.

The songs have been written by Manoj Yadav and composed by Tapas Relia. The four songs are 1) Sun Sugana Re sung by Suchi and Ankita Joshi 2) Sun Ri baavli sung by Papon 3) Aa Ghar Chale Hum sung by Monali Thakur and 4) Hain Reham Hain Karam sung by Kailash Kher.

== Soundtrack ==
Lakshmi

Soundtrack album by Tapas Relia
- Released: 17 January 2014
- Genre: Feature film soundtrack
- Length: 21:08
- Language: Hindi
- Label: Tips Official
External audio
- Audio Jukebox on YouTube

The soundtrack of Lakshmi comprises 4 songs composed by Tapas Relia with the lyrics being written by Manoj Yadav.

Tracklist
No.	Title	Singer(s)	Length
1.	"Hai Reham Hai Karam"	Kailash Kher	04:55
2.	"Sun Sugana Re"	Suchi, Ankita Joshi	05:42
3.	"Sun Ri Baavli"	Papon	05:32
4.	"Aa Ghar Chalein Hum"	Monali Thakur	04:54
Total length:			21:08

== Release and reception ==
The film was first viewed by the Central Board of Film Certification (CBFC) in November 2013, which found some scenes "objectionable" and slated it to be next viewed by a revising committee. However, till early January the film did not receive a viewing by committee and thus missed its 17 January Indian premiere date.

Ahead of its release in India, the film has its premiere on 13 January, at the 2014 Palm Springs International Film Festival, where it received critical acclaim and won the Audience Award for Best narrative feature, which is based on viewers' votes.

Anupama Chopra of Hindustan Times wrote, "Lakshmi is heartfelt and has some fine performances by Monali, Satish Kaushik and Shifaali Shah. However, In places, it’s repulsive and, yet, it demands to be seen."
