= Lene Christensen =

Lene Christensen may refer to:

- Lena Christensen, Thai-Danish actress, television presenter, and singer
- Lene Christensen (footballer) (born 2000), Danish footballer
