= Hyderabad Blues 2 =

- Poster
- Directed by: Nagesh Kukunoor
- Written by: Nagesh Kukunoor
- Produced by: Devika Bahudhanam; Elahe Hiptoola; Nagesh Kukunoor
- Starring: Nagesh Kukunoor; Jyoti Dogra; Tisca Chopra
- Cinematography: G.S. Bhaskar
- Edited by: Sanjib Datta
- Music by: Salim–Sulaiman; Trickbaby
- Production companies: SIC Productions; Kukunoor Movies
- Distributed by: UTV Motion Pictures
- Release date: 2 June 2004
- Country: India
- Language: English

Hyderabad Blues 2 is a 2004 Indian drama film written and directed by Nagesh Kukunoor. Primarily shot in English, the film is a direct sequel to Kukunoor's earlier work Hyderabad Blues produced by Kukunoor, Devika Bahudhanam, and Elahe Hiptoola. Kukunoor for his portrayal of Varun was nominated for the "Best Performance in an Indian Film in English" category in the Screen Weekly Awards. The dialogue is primarily in English, with some Telugu and Hindi spoken as well.

== Plot ==
The story of the sequel takes place 6 years after the action of the first film. After his marriage with Ashwini, Varun decides to stay in India. He starts a call centre while Ashwini is contemplating starting her own clinic. Looking at Seema and Sanjeev's family, after 6 years of marriage, Ashwini wants to have children, but Varun always avoids the topic, saying that the two of them are good for each other and he doesn't want anyone else in their lovely relationship. As Ashwini becomes increasingly desperate to have children, one of Varun's employees, the young and beautiful Menaka, tries to seduce Varun. Without crossing his limits, Varun stops Menaka. However, Ashwini doesn't believe Varun and divorces him, but then realizes her mistake. She apologizes, and the couple reunites.

== Cast ==
- Nagesh Kukunoor as Varun Naidu
- Jyoti Dogra as Ashwini Rao Naidu
- Tisca Chopra as Menaka
- Prakash Iyengar as Dr. Nath
- Elahe Hiptoola as Seema Rao
- Vikram Inamdar as Sanjeev Rao
- Anuj Gurwara as Azam
- Anoop Ratnaker Rao as Harish Chandani
- Anu Chengappa as Shashi Naidu
- Soumik Banerjee as Sunny

== Soundtrack ==
The music of the film is composed by Salim–Sulaiman. The soundtracks in the film are as follows.

- "Slipping Through Your Fingers" – Singer: Trickbaby
- "Tere Bina" – Singer: Fuzön
- "Dil Pe Mat Lo" – Singer: Anand
- "Mo Bhangra Blues" – Singer: Sonic Gurus
- "One Man" – Singer: Trickbaby
- "Mora Saiyaa Mose Bolena" – Singer: Fuzön
- "Sea of Stories" – Singer: Trickbaby
- "Additappa" – Singer: Caliche
- "Palace on Wheels, Aaj ki raat" – Singer: Biddu
