= Gulfam Khan =

Indian television and film actress (born 1975)

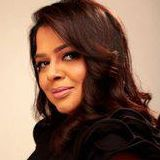
- Gulfam Khan
- Occupation: Actress
- Years active: 2000–present
- Website: www.gulfamkhan.com

Gulfam Khan is an Indian television and film actress who works in Indian television and Bollywood Hindi cinema. She is known for playing the role of Nazneen in Aladdin - Naam Toh Suna Hoga from 2018 to 2020.

== Early life ==
Gulfam is known in the industry as a Tech Junkie, and she is also fond of painting.

== Career ==
Khan made her acting debut in 2003, as Guddi, in the TV Series Lipstick. She has worked under well-known banners of the Mumbai Film Industry and with several producers and directors, for several television serials and movies (Ref the following section "Filmography"). She has recently been cast in Amir-Khan Starrer movie Talaash. In addition to her on-screen contribution, Gulfam Khan started writing screenplays in 2007. Gulfam has co-written some movie screenplays including Hisss with Jennifer Lynch. Gulfam has also written Comedy Circus Season-1 for Sony Entertainment Television (India). Gulfam has just completed working in Nagesh Kukunoors next movie Laxmi by National Award-winning director Nagesh Kukunoor, which has recently been sent for nominations to various film festivals.

Gulfam is currently looking to diversify her casting profile. After playing brothel owner Rasili Bai in Ghar Ki Lakshmi... Betiyann, a madame in the movie Talaash and a slum queen — a boss of all bad deeds — in Mann Mein Hai Vishwas, she has turned down two films and one soap, Bani — Ishq Da Kalma, which required her to repeat the role. She has received several appreciations from the industry for her various contributions to television and cinema.

== Filmography ==
=== Television ===
Year	Title	Role
2023	Dhruv Tara – Samay Sadi Se Pare	Lalita Sanjay Saxena
2022	Brij Ke Gopal	Sujatha
2021	Ziddi Dil Maane Na	Mrs Batra
2018-2021	Aladdin - Naam Toh Suna Hoga	Nazneen Chachi
2017-2018	Laado 2	Rajjo Choudhary
2016-2017	Khwaabon Ki Zamin Par	Sarla Kashyap
2016-2017	Naamkarann	Nanno/Fatima
2016	Ishq Ka Rang Safed	Mrs Avasthi
2015	Bhagyalaxmi	Kaveri
2013	Madhubala - Ek Ishq Ek Junoon	Sanchita Ghosh
2013	Bh Se Bhade	Lata
2012	Mrs. Kaushik Ki Paanch Bahuein	Kiran Bhalla
2012	R. K. Laxman Ki Duniya	Rajni Amma
2012	Diya Aur Baati Hum	Uma
2008	Aathvaan Vachan	Billo Maasi
	Chi and Me	Mrs. Khanna
2011	Bhagyavidhata	Surekha
2011	Hi! Padosi... Kaun Hai Doshi?	Tabassum Pasha
2009	Do Hanson Ka Jodaa	Ammaji
2008	Twinkle Beauty Parlour	Ram Dulari
	JBC with Javed Jaffery	Various
	Sindoor	Firdaus
2005-2008	Ghar Ki Lakshmi Betiyann	Rasili Bai
2005	Remix	Sonal Maasi
2005	India Calling	Sunita Godbole
2002	Lipstick	Guddi

=== Films ===
Year	Title	Role
2000	Astitva	Asma Parveen
2004	Ek Hasina Thi	The Prisoner
2004	Gayab	The Nag
2011	Mod	Nurse Kutty
2012	Talaash	Madam
2012	Kyaa Super Kool Hain Hum	Socialite
2014	Laxmi	Radha
2016	The Legend of Michael Mishra	Chachi
2016	Dhanak	Chachi
