= Salim–Sulaiman =

Indian musician and composer duo

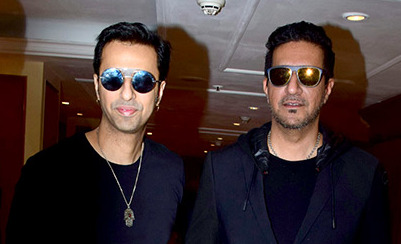
- Salim–Sulaiman at the inaugural press meet of MTV's Super Fight League season 2

Background information
- Origin: Mumbai, Maharashtra, India
- Genres: Filmi; Bollywood
- Occupation: music director
- Instruments: Keyboard; Harmonium
- Years active: 1993–present
- Members: Salim Merchant; Sulaiman Merchant
- Website: https://merchantrecords.in/

Salim–Sulaiman are an Indian music composer duo consisting of siblings Salim and Sulaiman Merchant. The duo has composed music predominantly for Hindi films.

== Life and early career ==
Salim–Sulaiman's ancestral town is Mundra, Kutch, Gujarat. They were inspired by their father Sadruddin Merchant, who used to lead Ismaili Scouts Orchestra in India.

Salim and Sulaiman have been composing music, having scored for movies such as Neal 'n' Nikki, Chak De! India, Rab Ne Bana Di Jodi and Fashion. The duo had also composed for many Indi-pop performers including Viva, Aasmaan, Shweta Shetty, Jasmine and Style Bhai among others, composed and produced several TV commercials and collaborated with artistes such as K. S. Chithra, Ustad Zakir Hussain, Ustad Sultan Khan, Ayisha Abdul Basith. After that, they have gone to do movies with producers and directors like Yash Chopra, Subhash Ghai and Ram Gopal Varma.

Salim Merchant was one of the three judges for the fifth season of Indian Idol on Sony Entertainment Television (India).

They created remix versions for the songs Born This Way and Judas by Lady Gaga. During the 2020 lockdown Salim–Sulaiman released Gandhi Jayanti single with Ricky Kej.

== Awards ==
Award	Year	Result	Awarded for	Nominated work
Mirchi Music Awards	2013	Won	Indie Pop Song of the Year	Cheene Re Mora Chain
Mirchi Music Awards	2014	Nominated	Indie Pop Song of the Year	Chulein Aasman
Filmfare Awards	2007	Won	Filmfare Award for Best Background Score	Krrish
Apsara Awards	2009	Nominated	Apsara Award for Best Music Director	Rab Ne Bana Di Jodi
IIFA Awards	2005	Won	IIFA Best Background Score Award	Mujhse Shaadi Karogi
Star Screen Awards	2003	Won	Star Screen Award for Best Background Score	Bhoot
Star Screen Awards	2004	Won	Star Screen Award for Best Background Score	Dhoom
Zee Cine Awards	2005	Won	Zee Cine Award for Best Background Score	Ab Tak Chhappan
Daytime Emmy Awards	2009	Nominated	Daytime Emmy Award For Outstanding Original Song in a Children's Series	Wonder Pets
Syracuse International Film Festival Awards	2008	Won	Best Music Director	Fashion
FHM (magazine) awards	2007	Won	Best Dressed Music Composers	
Filmfare Award for Best Male Playback Singer	2010	Nominated	Best Singer for Shukran Allah with Sonu Nigam	Kurbaan

== Filmography ==
Year	Film	Songs	Score	Notes
1997	Hameshaa	No	Yes	
1999	Pyaar Mein Kabhi Kabhi	No	Yes	
2000	Ghaath	No	Yes	
2001	Moksha	No	Yes	
2003	Qayamat: City Under Threat	No	Yes	
2003	Bhoot	Yes	Yes	
2003	3 Deewarein	No	Yes	
2003	Darna Mana Hai	Yes	Yes	
2003	Sssshhh...	No	Yes	
2003	Matrubhoomi	No	Yes	
2003	Fun2shh... Dudes in the 10th Century	No	Yes	
2004	Agnipankh	No	Yes	
2004	Ab Tak Chhappan	No	Yes	
2004	Hum Tum	No	Yes	
2004	Hyderabad Blues 2	No	Yes	
2004	Mujhse Shaadi Karoge	No	Yes	
2004	Shock	No	Yes	Tamil film
2004	Dhoom	No	Yes	
2004	Aitraaz	No	Yes	
2004	Naach'	No	Yes	
2005	Vaada	No	Yes	
2005	Kaal	Yes	Yes	
2005	Naina	No	Yes	
2005	Darna Zaroori Hai	No	Yes	
2005	Maine Pyaar Kyun Kiya?	No	Yes	
2005	Barsaat	No	Yes	
2005	No Entry	No	Yes	
2005	Iqbal	Yes	Yes	
2005	Salaam Namaste	No	Yes	
2005	Being Cyrus	No	Yes	
2005	Neal 'n' Nikki	Yes	Yes	
2005	Dosti: Friends Forever	No	Yes	
2005	Vaah! Life Ho Toh Aisi!	No	Yes	
2006	Mere Jeevan Sathi	No	Yes	
2006	Fight Club: Members Only	No	Yes	
2006	Pyare Mohan	No	Yes	
2006	36 China Town	No	Yes	
2006	Fanaa	No	Yes	
2006	Krrish	No	Yes	
2006	Naksha	No	Yes	
2006	Dor	Yes	Yes	
2006	Dhoom 2	No	Yes	
2006	Bhagam Bhag	No	Yes	
2007	Namastey London	No	Yes	
2007	Ta Ra Rum Pum	No	Yes	
2007	Chain Kulii Ki Main Kulii	Yes	Yes	
2007	Partner	No	Yes	
2007	Chak De! India	Yes	Yes	
2007	Heyy Babyy	No	Yes	
2007	Aaja Nachle	Yes	Yes	
2008	Bombay to Bangkok	Yes	Yes	
2008	Race	No	Yes	
2008	Bhoothnath	No	Yes	
2008	Singh Is Kinng	No	Yes	
2008	God Tussi Great Ho	No	Yes	
2008	Bachna Ae Haseeno	No	Yes	
2008	Roadside Romeo	Yes	Yes	Animated film
2008	Fashion	Yes	Yes	
2008	Dostana	No	Yes	
2008	Rab Ne Bana Di Jodi	Yes	Yes	
2009	8 x 10 Tasveer	Yes	Yes	
2009	Luck	Yes	No	
2009	Love Aaj Kal	No	Yes	
2009	Wanted	No	Yes	
2009	London Dreams	No	Yes	
2009	Ajab Prem Ki Ghazab Kahani	No	Yes	
2009	Kurbaan	Yes	Yes	
2009	De Dana Dan	No	Yes	
2009	Rocket Singh: Salesman of the Year	Yes	Yes	
2010	Pyaar Impossible	Yes	Yes	
2010	Teen Patti	Yes	Yes	
2010	I Hate Luv Storys	No	Yes	
2010	Kites	No	Yes	
2010	Paathshaala	No	Yes	
2010	Aashayein	Yes	Yes	
2010	Anjaana Anjaani	No	Yes	
2010	Action Replayy	No	Yes	
2010	Band Baaja Baaraat	Yes	Yes	
2011	Anaganaga O Dheerudu	Yes	Yes	Telugu film
2011	Love Breakups Zindagi	Yes	Yes	
2011	Aazaan	Yes	Yes	
2011	Shakal Pe Mat Ja	Yes	Yes	
2011	Ladies vs Ricky Bahl	Yes	Yes	
2012	Jodi Breakers	Yes	Yes	
2012	Cocktail	No	Yes	
2012	Heroine	Yes	Yes	
2012	Chakravyuh	Yes	Yes	
2013	Race 2	No	Yes	
2013	Rabba Main Kya Karoon	Yes	Yes	
2013	Satyagraha	Yes	Yes	
2013	Krrish 3	No	Yes	
2013	Gori Tere Pyaar Mein	No	Yes	
2014	Kaanchi	Yes	No	
2014	Mardaani	Yes	No	
2014	Bang Bang!	No	Yes	
2014	Ungli	Yes	No	
2015	Wedding Pullav	Yes	No	
2016	Jai Gangaajal	Yes	Yes	
2017	Poorna: Courage Has No Limit	Yes	No	
2017	Kaabil	No	Yes	
2017	Fukrey Returns	No	Yes	
2018	Race 3	No	Yes	
2018	102 Not Out	Yes	No	
2019	Setters	Yes	No	
2019	Student of the Year 2	No	Yes	
2020	Prawaas	Yes	No	Marathi film
2020	Coolie No. 1	Yes	No	
2021	The Power	Yes	No	
2021	Skater Girl	No	Yes	
2023	Ganapath	No	Yes	
2024	Main Atal Hoon	Yes	No	

=== Songs sung by Salim Merchant ===
Year	Songs	Album	Language	Composer	Lyricist	Notes
2006	''Aashayein''	Iqbal	Hindi	Salim–Sulaiman	Irfan Siddique	Sang the Chorus.
2009	''Shukran Allah''	Kurbaan	Hindi	Salim-Sulaiman	Niranjan Iyengar	
2009	"Khudaya Ve"	Luck	Hindi	Salim-Sulaiman	Shabbir Ahmed	
2010	''Aye Khuda''	Paathshaala	Hindi	Hanif Shaikh	Hanif Shaikh	
2010	''Aye Khuda'' (Remix)	Paathshaala	Hindi	Hanif Shaikh	Hanif Shaikh	
2010	''Ainvayi Ainvayi''	Band Baaja Baaraat	Hindi	Salim–Sulaiman	Amitabh Bhattacharya	
2012	"Ishq Wala Love"	Student of the Year	Hindi	Vishal–Shekhar	Anvita Dutt	

== Discography ==
Year	Album	Artist(s)	No. of songs	Notes/Ref(s)
1992	Raaga Raaga	K.S.Chithra, Voodoo (rapper)	8 songs	First Album
1995	Shweta – The New Album	Shweta Shetty, Shantanu Mukherjee	8 songs	Also known as Shweta – The New Album and other hits on Audio CD with the additional of 4 bonus tracks from 8 main tracks.
1995	Dole Dole and Other Hits	Suchitra Krishnamurthy	1 song	
1996	Channel Hits	Various	1 song	
1998	Maa	Sagarika, Shaan, Shweta Shetty, Suchitra Krishnamoorti and others As mentioned on the back of the album cover	8+3 songs (11 songs)	
2000	Prema.com	Various	1 song	
2000	Bhoomi	Zubeen Garg, Bhoomi, Ustad Sultan Khan and others	8 songs	
2020	Date Kar Le	CarryMinati	1 Song	
2022	Tsunami	Khesari Lal Yadav	1 Song	
2025	Bhoomi 2025	Salim-Sulaiman, Arijit Singh, Paradox, Sonu Nigam, Shreya Ghoshal,	10 Songs	
