= Dhanak =

2015 film by Nagesh Kukunoor

- Theatrical release poster
- Directed by: Nagesh Kukunoor
- Written by: Nagesh Kukunoor; Story Idea: Yusuf M. Shaikh
- Produced by: Nagesh Kukunoor; Elahe Hiptoola; Manish Mundra
- Starring: Hetal Gada; Krrish Chhabria; Vipin Sharma; Gulfam Khan; Vibha Chibber; Vijay Maurya
- Cinematography: Chirantan Das
- Edited by: Sanjib Dutta
- Music by: Tapas Relia
- Production companies: Kukunoor Movies; Drishyam Films
- Distributed by: PVR Pictures
- Release dates: 8 February 2015 (Berlin Film Festival); 17 June 2016 (India)
- Running time: 106 minutes
- Country: India
- Language: Hindi

Dhanak (Hindi pronunciation: [d̪ʰənək]; transl. Rainbow) is a 2015 Indian Hindi-language children's road film written and directed by Nagesh Kukunoor. Produced by Manish Mundra, Nagesh Kukunoor, and Elahe Hiptoola, the film features Hetal Gada and Krrish Chhabria as the two children, playing brother and sister, in the leading roles, with supporting performances from Chet Dixon, Vipin Sharma, Gulfam Khan, Vibha Chibber, Flora Saini, and Vijay Maurya. The film was released India wide to widely positive reviews on 17 June 2016. Dhanak received the Best Children's Film trophy at the 64th National Film Awards. Dhanak won the Special Mention Crystal Bear for the Best Feature Film by The Children's Jury for Generation Kplus at the 65th Berlinale.

== Plot ==
Every morning Pari (Hetal Gada) and Chotu's (Krrish Chhabria) long walk to school begins with a coin toss outside their hut. The winner will decide if the story that will be told on the way to school that day will be one about a Shah Rukh Khan film or a Salman Khan film. The siblings are rivals in their love for the two stars. Pari is devoted to Shah Rukh and Chotu worships Salman Khan (down to wearing a replica of the star's trademark silver bracelet with a blue stone).

Ten-year-old Pari holds her precocious eight-year-old brother's hand throughout the journey to school and back. She's not just his friend and sister but, since Chotu is visually impaired, also his guide. With just months to go before Chotu turns nine, Pari feels the pressure to fulfill her promise to her brother - that he will have his eyesight back before his ninth birthday.

She finds some hope when she spots a poster of Shah Rukh Khan (SRK) encouraging eye donations. She begins to write him letters addressed to his home, Mannat, in Mumbai, which go unanswered. Eventually, they realize that he is not in Mumbai but in a village in Rajasthan for a film shoot portraying a Rajput prince. Convinced that a meeting with SRK is all it would take to get Chotu his eyes back, the children set off alone on a 300 km journey traversing testing terrain.

== Cast ==
- Krrish Chhabria as Chotu
- Hetal Gada as Pari
- Vipin Sharma as Dungaram
- Gulfam Khan as Gowri
- Idhant Singh as Madan Mohan
- Swastik Chavan as Bully
- Narendra Singh Rajpurohit as Bathposh
- Harmeet Arora as Aashajii
- Rajiv Laxman as Gardu
- Pratyaksh Kalra as Shamsher Singh
- Rahul Lohani as Saffron Robed man
- Ramakant Dayma as Prataap Sharma (Kidnapper)
- Vibha Chibber as Sheera Mata/Vibha
- Ramakant Dayama as Old Man (Kidnapper)
- Chet Dixon as Douglas Adams (special appearance in Damadam)
- Flora Saini as Gypsy Woman
- Bharati Achrekar as Dadisa
- Suresh Menon as Badrinath
- Ninad Kamat as Aatmaram Khandelwal
- Vinny Arora as Asha
- Priyank Sharma

== Production ==
Dhanak was entirely shot in Jodhpur, and Jaisalmer, Rajasthan, India.

== Release ==
The film was premiered at the 65th Berlin International Film Festival (Berlinale). Dhanak was also screened at the Indian Film Festival of Los Angeles, and the Toronto International Film Festival. It was released nationwide in India on 17 June 2016.

== Accolades ==
The film won the Crystal Bear for Best Children's Film, and Special Mention for the Best Feature Film by the Children's Jury for Generation Kplus at 65th Berlin International Film Festival. The film has garnered the Best Film Award in the main category-Children's Feature Film Competition, Cinema in Sneakers, and the Best Film Award at the Montreal International Children's Film Festival (FIFEM). The film won Best Children's Film at the 64th National Film Awards.

== Soundtrack ==
All songs were composed and produced by Tapas Relia. The lyrics were by Manoj Yadav, Mir Ali Husain and Tapas Relia.

No.	Title	Singers	Lyricist	Length
1	"Chal Chalein"	Papon, Vibha Saraf, Shivamm Pathak	Ali Mir Husain	5:21
2	"Jeene Se Bhi Zyada Jiyein"	Shivamm Pathak	Manoj Yadav	5:02
3	"Dhanak"	Monali Thakur	Ali Mir Husain	5:10
4	"Damadam" (Let's Give Love A Chance)	Chet Dixon, Devu Khan Manganiyar	Tapas Relia, Traditional	4:40
5	"Mehandi"	Anwar Khan Manganiyar, Swaroop Khan, Niyaz Khan	Traditional	3:56
