= Vibha Chibber =

Indian film and television actress

- Born: Mumbai, Maharashtra, India
- Education: National School of Drama
- Occupations: Film and television actress
- Years active: 1986–present
- Children: Puru Chibber

Vibha Chibber is an Indian actress and theatre artist who appears in TV shows & Hindi films. She is well known for her memorable work in the successful television soaps Sapna Babul Ka... Bidaai, Mrs. Kaushik Ki Paanch Bahuein and Kasam Tere Pyaar Ki. TV actor Puru Chibber is her son.

== Career ==
Vibha graduated as an actor from the National School of Drama in 1986. Since then, she has worked with Barry John, Amal Allana, Kirti Jain, Anuradha Kapoor Prassanna and many other playwrights and directors. She then joined Theatre in Education, a wing of the NSD, as a teacher. She has taught acting to children as well as adults.

Before coming into films & television, she was mainly into theatre. She has worked on the docu-drama "7 Island And A Metro" with director Madhushree Dutta. Vibha has shared screen space on the celluloid with some of the finest actors in the country such as Shahrukh Khan, Rani Mukherjee, Ranbir Kapoor, Asin etc.

== Filmography ==
=== Television ===
Year	Title	Role
2007–10	Sapna Babul Ka...Bidaai	Kaushalya Sharma
2008	Saas v/s Bahu	—N/a
2011	Looteri Dulhan	Chanda
2011–13	Mrs. Kaushik Ki Paanch Bahuein	Bindeshwari Kaushik
2013	Punar Vivah 2	—N/a
2014–15	Humsafars	Alvira Choudhry
2015	Piya Rangrezz	Pramila Devi
2015	Hum Aapke Ghar Mein Rehte Hain	Bachani Devi
2016–18	Kasam Tere Pyaar Ki	Rano Singh Bedi
2020	Pavitra Bhagya	Baljeet Khurana
2021	Amma Ke Babu Ki Baby	Kaushalya Chaudhary
2021	Tera Yaar Hoon Main	Gurmeet Kaur Singh
2021	Choti Sarrdaarni	Harshdeep Kaur Babbar
2023–24	Neerja – Ek Nayi Pehchaan	Shubhra Bagchi
2024	Mehndi Wala Ghar	Janaki Agarwal

=== Films ===
Year	Film	Role	Notes
2006	7 Island And A Metro	Ismat Chugtai	Docudrama
2007	Chak De! India	Krishnaji	
2007	Saawariya	Naseeban	
2008	Ghajini	Havaldar Vijyanti	
2009	Let's Dance	Vibha Chibber	
2010	Peter Gaya Kaam Se	Peter's Mother	
2013	Jolly LLB	Meerut Judge	
2013	Boss	Mrs. Pradhan	
2014	Lakshmi	Amma	
2015	Dolly Ki Doli	Commissioner Kiran Chaudhary	
2016	Palki	Lata	
2016	Dhanak	Sheera Mata	
2018	Blackmail	Mrs. Chawla	
2019	Drive	Vibha Singh	Netflix release
2019	Motichoor Chaknachoor	Indu Tyagi	
2022	Thai Massage	Mrs. Panchal	
2023	Agra	Mummy ji	
2024	Bhakshak	Rajni Singh	
2025	Ufff Yeh Siyapaa	Nirmala	
2025	Jolly LLB 3	Judge Poonam Aggarwal	
