= Bombay to Bangkok =

- Movie poster for Bombay to Bangkok
- Directed by: Nagesh Kukunoor
- Written by: Nagesh Kukunoor
- Produced by: Elahe Hiptoola; Rahul Puri
- Starring: Shreyas Talpade; Lena Christensen
- Cinematography: Sudeep Chatterjee
- Edited by: Sanjib Datta
- Music by: Songs: Pritam; Salim-Sulaiman; Ronnie-Shirish; Sukhwinder Singh; Background Score: Salim-Sulaiman
- Production companies: Mukta Searchlight Films; SIC Productions
- Distributed by: Eros International
- Release date: 11 January 2008
- Running time: 169 minutes
- Country: India
- Language: Hindi

Bombay to Bangkok is a 2008 Indian Hindi-language crime comedy film written and directed by Nagesh Kukunoor, starring Shreyas Talpade and Lena Christensen.

== Plot ==
Shankar, a chef in desperate need of money, steals from the local don and escapes by tagging along with a team of doctors heading for relief work in Bangkok. Unfortunately, he loses the all-important money bag in the chaos.

In Bangkok, his world turns upside down at a massage parlour where he bumps into Jasmine. The hitch is, she is all Thai, and he can't converse with her at all. A ray of hope comes his way the next day when Jasmine turns up desperately in need of a doctor.

Shankar, posing as a doctor along with his Sikh buddy Rachinder, jumps into this whirlpool, while Jasmine soon gets pulled into his bumbling adventures while running away from the don and his son, Jamal.

== Cast ==
- Shreyas Talpade as Shankar Singh / Dr. Bhatawdekar (fake)
- Lena Christensen as Jasmine
- Vijay Maurya as Jamal Khan (Jam-K)
- Yatin Karyekar as Dr. Yatin Tripathi
- Manmeet Singh as Rachinder Singh (Rash)
- Jeneva Talwar as Dr. Rati
- Naseeruddin Shah as Don Khan, Jamal's father (special appearance)

== Soundtrack ==
No.	Title	Music	Singer(s)	Length
1.	"We Are Same Same but different"	Salim-Sulaiman	KK and Shreyas Talpade
2.	"Dheere Dheere"	Ronnie-Shirish	Zubeen Garg
3.	"Jaani O Jaani"	Salim-Sulaiman	Zubeen Garg
4.	"Dil Ka Haal Sune Dil Dilwala"	Pritam	Sonu Nigam and Sunidhi Chauhan
5.	"Bombay Ho Bangkok"	Sukhwinder Singh	Sukhwinder Singh

== Reception ==
Sonia Chopra of Sify gave the film 3 out of 5, writing ″Bombay to Bangkok is recommended for a one-time watch for its breezy tone, a few funny moments and a stupendous performance by Talpade.″

Conversely, Khalid Mohamed of Hindustan Times gave the film 2 out of 5, ″This could have been a fun movie if it had strived for quality. No one did. So, do yourself a favour, fly over this Kukunoor’s nest. Or weep.″ Taran Adarsh of IndiaFM gave the film 1.5 out of 5, writing ″Shreyas is a fine actor and he proves his abilities yet again. Lena, the Thai actress, is equally competent. The actor enacting the role of Rachinder is good. Vijay Maurya is excellent. Yateen Karyekar is alright. Naseeruddin Shah is there for just one scene. On the whole, BOMBAY TO BANGKOK has a few enjoyable moments, but that's about it.″
