= City of Dreams (TV series) =

Indian web series

- Poster
- Genre: Political drama; Crime
- Created by: Nagesh Kukunoor; Rohit Banawlikar
- Written by: Nagesh Kukunoor; Rohit Banawlikar
- Directed by: Nagesh Kukunoor
- Starring: Atul Kulkarni; Priya Bapat; Sachin Pilgaonkar; Eijaz Khan; Siddharth Chandekar
- Theme music composer: Tapas Relia
- Composer: Tapas Relia
- Country of origin: India
- Original language: Hindi
- No. of seasons: 3
- No. of episodes: 29

Production
- Executive producers: Siddharth Khaitan; Neha Mishra; Arnav Chakravarti
- Producers: Sameer Nair; Deepak Segal; Nagesh Kukunoor; Elahe Hiptoola
- Production location: India
- Running time: 38 - 54 minutes
- Production companies: Applause Entertainment; Kukunoor Movies

Original release
- Network: Disney+ Hotstar
- Release: 3 May 2019 – present

City of Dreams is an Indian political drama television series which is available on Hotstar on its new label Hotstar Specials from 3 May 2019. It is directed by Nagesh Kukunoor starring Atul Kulkarni, Priya Bapat, Sachin Pilgaonkar, Eijaz Khan, Siddharth Chandekar and Adinath Kothare. Music is composed by Tapas Relia.

It received mixed reviews with praise for Kulkarni's performance and criticism for writing and direction.

== Conception ==
The idea for the show came from Kukunoor's team member, Rohit Banawlikar. Banawlikar and Kukunoor co-wrote an anthology, intended to be turned into a feature film. But as digital platforms grew in India, Kukunoor felt that there was a scope for a series.

== Plot ==
Multiple lives intersect after an assassination attempt on Mumbai's most polarising political figure. A single stone thrown in a seemingly placid lake sets off a series of ripples that affect everyone and hurt many. City of Dreams is the story of the feud within the Gaikwad family, which erupts after an assassination attempt on a polarizing political figure. Blurring the lines between moral and immoral, in a struggle for power forms the core of this transfixing narrative.

== Cast ==
- Priya Bapat as Poornima Gaikwad
- Siddharth Chandekar as Ashish Rao Gaikwad (Season 1)
- Eijaz Khan as SI Wasim Khan
- Atul Kulkarni as Amey Rao Gaikwad 'Saheb'
- Sushant Singh as Jagan Hejmadi 'Anna' (Season 2)
- Devas Dixit as Raja
- Vishwas Kini as Goutam (Season 1)
- Sandeep Kulkarni as Purushottam
- Rakesh Dubey as Inspector Siddhesh Laad (season 2)
- Uday Tikekar as Jiten Kaka (Season 1)
- Amrita Bagchi as Katrina (Season 1)
- Sachin Pilgaonkar as CM Jagdish Gurav
- Shishir Sharma as Ramnik Bhai
- Flora Saini as Mystery Women, Asha
- Ivan Rodrigues as Nambiar (Season 2)
- Geetika Tyagi as Shireen Ali
- Rio Kapadia as Commissioner Roy
- Saurabh Goyal as Koushik Amre
- Pavleen Gujral as Lipakshi (Season 1)
- Lekha Prajapati as Lipakshi (Season 2 - replaced)
- Adinath Kothare as Mahesh Arawle
- Divya Seth as Vibha
- Ankur Rathee as Arvind Mehta
- Vibhawari Deshpande as Manjari
- Gauransh Chauhan as Rashid
- Atisha Naik as Asiya
- Sajjad Khan as Bhairav Pal
- Shriyam Bhagnani as Tanya Mehta
- Sunit Razdan as Dabolkar

== Series overview ==
Series	Episodes	Originally released
1	10	3 May 2019
2	10	31 July 2021
3	9	26 May 2023

=== Season 1 (2019) ===
No.	Title	Directed by	Written by	Original release date
1	"The Shoot-out"	Nagesh Kukunoor	Nagesh Kukunoor; Rohit Banawlikar	3 May 2019
An assassination attempt on Mumbai’s political stalwart Ameya Rao Gaikwad stuns the city. As the family deals with the shock, his son Ashish takes centre stage, while 'Encounter' Wasim gets on the case, unofficially.
2	"The Response"	Nagesh Kukunoor	Nagesh Kukunoor; Rohit Banawlikar	3 May 2019
With his personal life in a mess, Wasim gets a lead on one of the shooters. Meanwhile, Ashish spins out of control and a concerned Jiten asks Poornima to take charge.
3	"The Rift"	Nagesh Kukunoor	Nagesh Kukunoor; Rohit Banawlikar	3 May 2019
Poornima tries to persuade Ashish to consult her before making any decision, which doesn't go down well with him. Meanwhile, Wasim keeps the hunt on in his own inimitable style.
4	"The Hunt"	Nagesh Kukunoor	Nagesh Kukunoor; Rohit Banawlikar	3 May 2019
When Ashish crosses the line, Poornima confronts him. On the other hand, Wasim tries to change the game with the trump card in his hand.
5	"The Decision"	Nagesh Kukunoor	Nagesh Kukunoor; Rohit Banawlikar	3 May 2019
Ashish makes a shocking confession to Shireen. Later, a furious Poornima opens up to Lipakshi.
6	"The Black Book"	Nagesh Kukunoor	Nagesh Kukunoor; Rohit Banawlikar	3 May 2019
Poornima turns the table on Ashish's rally. Elsewhere, Wasim gets closer to the assassin, while Jiten hides the black book.
7	"The Mastermind"	Nagesh Kukunoor	Nagesh Kukunoor; Rohit Banawlikar	3 May 2019
Consumed by power and politics, Poornima's relationship with Kaushik begins to crumble. Wasim meets an old informant and finds a crucial lead.
8	"The Awakening"	Nagesh Kukunoor	Nagesh Kukunoor; Rohit Banawlikar	3 May 2019
Scrambling for political support, Poornima tries hard to find her normal, while CM Jagdish gets into an unexpected alliance.
9	"The Betrayal"	Nagesh Kukunoor	Nagesh Kukunoor; Rohit Banawlikar	3 May 2019
Taking advantage of the situation, Jagdish makes his way to Delhi while Poornima learns the truth about the attack and the perpetrators.
10	"The Victory"	Nagesh Kukunoor	Nagesh Kukunoor; Rohit Banawlikar	3 May 2019
In the lead up to the grand party meeting, matters come to a head. Someone will win and someone will lose.

=== Season 2 (2021) ===
No.	Title	Directed by	Written by	Original release date
1	"The Contender"	Nagesh Kukunoor	Nagesh Kukunoor; Rohit Banawlikar	30 July 2021
As Poornima takes over as the CM and leader of MJS with the support of Gurav and Wasim, a deadly disaster challenges her reign. Meanwhile, Ameya comes out of his convalescence.
2	"The Raid"	Nagesh Kukunoor	Nagesh Kukunoor; Rohit Banawlikar	30 July 2021
Purushottam's mystery woman is revealed to have a dubious connection with Gaikwad. Poornima unleashes hell on Mehka Infra.
3	"Moment of Truth"	Nagesh Kukunoor	Nagesh Kukunoor; Rohit Banawlikar	30 July 2021
Shireen makes a bold move that causes a media frenzy. Gaikwad begins to regroup and sets his plan in motion.
4	"Skeletons in the Closet"	Nagesh Kukunoor	Nagesh Kukunoor; Rohit Banawlikar	30 July 2021
Ramnik meets Poornima to negotiate for Mehka Infra. Gaikwad visits a long-forgotten person from Poornima's past and makes him an offer he can't refuse.
5	"The Offer"	Nagesh Kukunoor	Nagesh Kukunoor; Rohit Banawlikar	30 July 2021
Wasim discovers not only a conspiracy to disrupt the elections but also Nambiar's weakness. However, Poornima's problems begin when Gaikwad plays his trump card.
6	"The Prophecy"	Nagesh Kukunoor	Nagesh Kukunoor; Rohit Banawlikar	30 July 2021
As the world gets more curious about Poornima and Mahesh's relationship, she ventures out to seek answers. At the same time, Tanya finally shows Arvind her world.
7	"City of Dreams"	Nagesh Kukunoor	Nagesh Kukunoor; Rohit Banawlikar	30 July 2021
While Poornima challenges Mahesh to a live debate, Purushottam asks Wasim's help for Asha. Meanwhile, a sinister plan is brewing in the city.
8	"The Truce"	Nagesh Kukunoor	Nagesh Kukunoor; Rohit Banawlikar	30 July 2021
With Purushottam held hostage and Poornima's family life in turmoil, the CM meets a despondent Mahesh. Elsewhere, Tanya confronts Arvind about Mehka Infra and the bridge collapse.
9	"The Unforgiving"	Nagesh Kukunoor	Nagesh Kukunoor; Rohit Banawlikar	30 July 2021
When Gurav's past catches up to him in the news, Sone Maa advises him to face his demons. In the meantime, Poornima meets Jagan to rescue Purushottam.
10	"Collateral Damage"	Nagesh Kukunoor	Nagesh Kukunoor; Rohit Banawlikar	30 July 2021
As Gaikwad prepares for his comeback, Poornima is all set to inaugurate the Mumbai metro project. However, both father and daughter pay a heavy price in their game of power.

=== Season 3 (2023) ===
No.	Title	Directed by	Written by	Original release date
1	"Where is Poornima Gaikwad?"	Nagesh Kukunoor	Nagesh Kukunoor; Rohit Banawlikar	26 May 2023
Amidst unrest in the MJS party, Ameya Rao Gaikwad, the interim CM, seeks the help of reinstated cop Wasim Khan to find Poornima, who has been missing for over three months.
2	"Homecoming"	Nagesh Kukunoor	Nagesh Kukunoor; Rohit Banawlikar	26 May 2023
Despite battling anxiety and alcohol addiction, Poornima accepts her fate and returns home with Wasim. Asha runs out of options. Gaikwad and Vibha's relationship goes sour.
3	"Reconciliation"	Nagesh Kukunoor	Nagesh Kukunoor; Rohit Banawlikar	26 May 2023
While Poornima struggles to get back to her normal life, Wasim joins the Drugs Task Force. As she and her father mend fences, Kasturinath plans a big exposé on Gaikwad.
4	"The Drug Syndicate"	Nagesh Kukunoor	Nagesh Kukunoor; Rohit Banawlikar	26 May 2023
Wasim starts cracking down on the drug syndicate. Vibha and Adarsh join hands. With Poornima preparing her comeback as the CM, Gaikwad faces the media.
5	"Character Assassination"	Nagesh Kukunoor	Nagesh Kukunoor; Rohit Banawlikar	26 May 2023
Gurav conspires with Vibha and Kadam to plan a coup against the Gaikwads, in which Poornima takes a hit. Danny's grandmother welcomes Angie into their home.
6	"The Truth"	Nagesh Kukunoor	Nagesh Kukunoor; Rohit Banawlikar	26 May 2023
Poornima reveals her truth to the world. Danny has a surprise for Angie. Gaikwad tries to reconcile with Jagan.
7	"Skeletons In The Cupboard"	Nagesh Kukunoor	Nagesh Kukunoor; Rohit Banawlikar	26 May 2023
Gaikwad's past comes back to haunt him as Gurav sets up another plan with the help of Kadam and Badivdekar. Meanwhile, Jagan has something big up his sleeve.
8	"The Offer"	Nagesh Kukunoor	Nagesh Kukunoor; Rohit Banawlikar	26 May 2023
As Wasim walks into a trap set for him, the Gaikwads try their best to lure back the defecting MLAs. An angry Pinchoo confronts Danny. Asha calls Wasim with important information.
9	"Good Vs Evil"	Nagesh Kukunoor	Nagesh Kukunoor; Rohit Banawlikar	26 May 2023
Wasim finally reveals to Poornima who he has kept hidden in a safe house. When the Gaikwads are on their way to Satara, Jagan makes his move.

== Promotion ==
On 21 April 2019, Hotstar Specials released the teaser for City of Dreams on YouTube and other social media platforms announcing the release of the series on 3 May 2019. The show will consist of 10 episodes.

== Reception ==
Upon release, Gautaman Bhaskaran of News18 rated the show a 2 out of 5 and said "Kukunoor gives away too many clues, and viewers can easily guess how the series will pan out".

Udita Jhunjhunwala of Firstpost rated it two stars and was of the opinion that the show was longer than necessary and the show missed a tight script and several scenes were dispensable.

Soumya Rao from Scroll.in reviewed that "the protagonists were iterations of characters that have been seen often on the screen".

Ektaa Malik from The Indian Express critically reviewed the show and stated "With Nagesh Kukunoor as director, the expectations were high from City of Dreams. Even the repeated, but not-needed, ‘strong language, violence, nudity and sex’ — used as labels for the show — do nothing to salvage it."
