= Cinema in Sneakers =

Film festival held in Warsaw, Poland

Cinema in Sneakers - Film Festival for Children and Youth
- Location: Warsaw
- Founded: 2013
- Awards: "Film-Wanderer"
- Festival date: Held annually
- Website: http://www.kinowtrampkach.pl/en/

Cinema in Sneakers (Polish: Kino w Trampkach) is an annual film festival for children and youth held in Warsaw, Poland, since 2013. There are few categories of movies presented during the festival. All films have age recommendations. The audience is presented with all kind of motion pictures: live-action films, documentary films, animated films, experimental films, all ranging from short to feature-length films.

During the festival there are film competitions. The winners are chosen by a Children's Jury and a Youth Jury. There are also audience plebiscite.

The film festival Cinema in Sneakers consists of many different events. Beside watching movies, participants can participate in exhibitions, meet with festival guests, and attend workshops aimed to develop their media competence.

The main award of the festival is the "Film - Wanderer" award.

== Festival editions ==
- 1st edition: 26-29.09.2013
- 2nd edition: 20-28.09.2014
- 3rd edition: 13-21.06.2015
- 4th edition: 1-12.06.2016
- 5th edition: 31.05-11.06.2017

== Award winners ==
The 1st and 2nd editions had no film competitions.

Winners of 3rd edition (held in 2015):

- "Anatole's little saucepan" 2014, dir. Éric Montchaud (Children Short Films Competition)
- "Nelly" 2014, dir. Chris Raiber (Youth Short Films Competitions)
- "Rainbow" 2014, dir. Nagesh Kukunoor (Children Feature Films Competition)
- "Nena" 2014, dir. Saskia Diesing (Youth Feature Films Competitions)

Distinctions:

- "Mythopolis" 2013, dir. Alexandra Hetmerová (Children Short Films Competition)
- "Oscar Wilde's the Nightingale and the Rose" 2014, dir. Del Kathryn Barton oraz Brendan Fletcher (Youth Short Films Competitions)
- "Crow's Egg" 2014, dir. M. Manikandan (Children Feature Films Competition)
- "One Night in Oslo" 2014, dir. Eirik Svensson (Youth Feature Films Competitions)

Audience's Plebiscite Award:

- "Opposite field" 2013, dir. Jay Shapiro

Winners of 4th edition (held in 2016):

- "Ninnoc" 2015, dir. Niki Padidar (Children Short Films Competition)
- "Hördur" 2015, dir. Ekrem Ergün (Children Feature Films Competition)
- "Balcony" 2015, dir. Toby Fell-Holden (Youth Short Films Competitions)
- "Rag Union" 2015, dir. Mikhail Mestetskiy (Youth Feature Films Competitions)

Distinctions:

- "Sing" 2015, dir. Kristof Deák (Children Short Films Competition)
- "The New Kid" 2015, dir. Rudi Rosenberg (Children Feature Films Competition)
- "Spoetnik" 2015, dir. Noël Loozen (Youth Short Films Competitions)
- "Starless Oskouei" 2015, dir. Mehrdad Oskouei (Youth Feature Films Competitions)

Audience's Plebiscite Award:

- "Little Gangster" 2015, dir. Arne Toonema

== Festival sections ==
Competitions' sections

- Children Short Films Competition
- Children Feature Films Competition
- Youth Short Films Competitions
- Youth Feature Films Competitions

Other sections

- Childhood enchantments

Two people important to the field of children’s and youth culture are invited to present to the viewers films that impressed them when they were younger. Each person chooses two films.

- Icons of pop culture

It's impossible to exclude children from the mass communication space, from marketing campaigns precisely attracting current and future consumers. What is pop culture? What should happen for a phenomenon or a film hero, for example, to enter the canon? What is the difference between culture and pop culture and can pop-culture be art? How should pop culture be used consciously? During the festival's meetings people can discuss these questions and more.

- Focus on docs

Documentaries addressed to young viewers and focused on their peers. It's not a separate section, but the organizers want to promote documentaries concerning children and youth.

- Digital Poland for Kids

Cinematic time machine POLSKA CYFROWA DLA DZIECI. In cooperation with WFDiF and Polish Film Archives a bunch of remastered films for kids and youth are presented.

- Missed it? Must watch it!

A section with films that are distributed widely in cinemas and deserve watching.

- Out of competition

Films which have been screened in Poland but not in regular distribution. Those that deserve to be reminded to children and youth also in the mark of the festival's motto. Films which have received prizes and special prizes recently, not only by the children's and youth jury but also professional.

== Youth Programming Group ==
Convocated in 2014, this is a group of 6-8 people aged between 14 and 21. These are young cinema fans who want to share their passion with their peers and learn to watch and judge films professionally. Apart from the competition film selection, YPG offers advice concerning special sections, presents films and gives interviews.

== Jury ==
- Children’s Jury for short films – 5 people aged 10–12
- Children’s Jury for full-feature films – 7 people aged 11–13
- Youth Jury for short and full-length films – 7 people over 14 years old

== Manifesto ==
- The youngsters are entitled to diverse, multi-angled cinema.
- Films represent entertainment all the time; and art – only sometimes. The youngsters have the right to both: high-end entertainment and art.
- Films are to encourage the processes of thinking and finding.
- Kids' film is not a genre. Genres are comedy, drama, thriller, adventure, romance – all of which can be made for youngsters.
- The youngsters should have access to films about them, for them, starring actors their age.
- The youngsters have the right to go to the cinema. Preferably in sneakers.
- The youngsters have the right to familiarizing themselves with art and film production through interactive classes and workshops.
