= Bollywood Calling =

2001 film by Nagesh Kukunoor

- Directed by: Nagesh Kukunoor
- Written by: Nagesh Kukunoor
- Produced by: B. Satyanarayana; Elahe Hiptoola; Nagesh Kukunoor
- Starring: Navin Nischol; Om Puri; Nagesh Kukunoor; Perizaad Zorabian
- Cinematography: Keshav Prakash
- Edited by: Renu Saluja
- Music by: Ashirvad Luke; Vishal–Shekhar
- Distributed by: 20th Century Fox
- Release date: 21 December 2001
- Country: India
- Language: English

Bollywood Calling is a 2001 Indian English-language comedy drama film written and directed by Nagesh Kukunoor. The film stars Pat Cusick, Navin Nischol, Om Puri, and Perizaad Zorabian.

The film showcases the satirical nuances of Bollywood. It was screened at the Rome Film Festival, and the MAMI Film Festival. The film received mixed reviews from critics.

== Cast ==
- Pat Cusick as Patrick Stormaire
- Navin Nischol as Manu Kapoor
- Om Puri as Subramaniam
- Perizaad Zorabian as Kajal
- Monique Curnen as Karen
- Chet Dixon as Abe
- Elahe Hiptoola as Reporter
- Nagesh Kukunoor as Gullu
- Mira Nair as Mira

== Reception ==
Priya Ganapati of Rediff.com wrote, "witty and irreverent, Bollywood Calling is a laugh-a-riot. Enjoy its idiosyncrasies". Dhiraj Singh of Outlook India rated the film 1/5 stars and wrote, "The film has its moments of light-heartedness, but on the whole it is not even close to being called a great film".
