= 8 x 10 Tasveer =

2009 Indian film directed by Nagesh Kukunoor

8 × 10 Tasveer
- Theatrical release poster
- Directed by: Nagesh Kukunoor
- Written by: Nagesh Kukunoor
- Produced by: Shailendra Singh; Devika Bahudhanam; Matthew Brown; Elahe Hiptoola; Wendy Knill; Sarita Patil; Praful Salunke; Rajesh Shah; KD
- Starring: Akshay Kumar; Ayesha Takia; Sharmila Tagore; Jaaved Jaaferi
- Cinematography: Vikas Shivraman
- Edited by: Sanjib Datta; Consultanting Editor: Apurva Asrani Bunty Nagi
- Music by: Songs: Salim–Sulaiman Bohemia Neeraj Shridhar; Score: Salim–Sulaiman
- Production companies: SIC Productions; Mirah Entertainment
- Distributed by: Percept Picture Company; Sahara One
- Release date: 3 April 2009
- Running time: 119 minutes
- Country: India
- Language: Hindi
- Box office: est. ₹235.80 million

8 x 10 Tasveer (transl. '8 x 10 picture') is a 2009 Indian Hindi-language mystery thriller film written and directed by Nagesh Kukunoor, and produced by Percept Picture Company, starring Akshay Kumar and Ayesha Takia. In the film, an Alberta-based forest ranger uses his mental ability to enter a photograph and re-experience the events from a person's point of view to solve the mystery behind his father's death, believed to be caused by natural reasons.

The film co-stars Sharmila Tagore, Jaaved Jaaferi, Anant Mahadevan, Girish Karnad, Benjamin Gilani, Rushad Rana, Andrea Tully, and Pia Shah. It was previously called Tasveer, but changed due to the director's insistence that the title was jinxed. The film's music is composed by Salim–Sulaiman with a title track by Bohemia.

The film was released theatrically on 3 April 2009. Following the mixed reception, it became a commercial failure.

== Plot ==
Jai Puri, a forest ranger in Alberta, Canada, has the ability to enter a photograph and re-experience the events from a person's point of view. While partying on a boat, his father Jatin meets with an accident. Following his death, a former detective, Habibullah Pasha, a.k.a. "Happi," meets Jai and tells him that Jatin had done him a lot of favors, due to which he wants to catch his murderer. Jai initially believes Jatin died naturally due to a heart attack, but decides to use his skills and enter an 8x10 photograph of Jatin, his brother Sunder, his longtime friend and lawyer Anil, and his surrogate son Adit, clicked by Jai's mother Savitri while on the boat. He enters the photo from Jatin's point of view and sees him falling to his death. However, due to staying within the photograph for more than a minute, Jai gets admitted to the hospital. He suspects Sunder, who watched Jatin fall to death, and chases him, but the latter escapes. Happi believes someone gave Jatin extra beta blockers since he had suffered from two heart attacks earlier, and falling into the cold water led to a heart attack. Jai re-enters the photo from Sunder's point of view and sees him mixing the pills into Jatin's drink. Jai is readmitted to the hospital and tells Sheila about everything, including his abilities, before they break into Sunder's house and find his strangled corpse. Soon, Jai and Sheila are pursued by a black SUV that tries to kill them. Jai chases the vehicle, but the driver manages to flee.

Happi enlists the help of Sally, a nurse who helps with a medical aide to Jai, as he enters the photo from Anil's point of view and sees him talk to Savitri about something she doesn't want a part in. Jai re-enters the photo from Adit's point of view and realizes it was him who gave Sunder the pills to mix in Jatin's drink. Adit, realizing Jai knows the truth, tries to kill him but flees when Happi returns after receiving a message from Jai about Adit being the killer. Later, Anil reveals that Jatin wanted to give his wealth to Jai's environment company, due to which the three men planned to kill Jai so that they don't lose their share. Jai realizes Savitri is in danger as she's about to transfer the money and gets stabbed before Jai arrives, and a chase ensues. The attacker manages to escape, but Savitri tells Jai to look for a box inside a room, which he does. He gets an adrenaline injection from Sally and informs Happi that Jatin saw someone before falling, and that was what he wanted to tell Jai about earlier. He re-enters from Jatin's point of view and is left in a stupor when the attacker enters and burns the photograph.

The attacker and the last person Jatin saw turn out to be Jai's small twin brother Jeet, whose falling from a cliff led to Jai gaining his ability. Jeet, who was assumed dead, believed Jai pushed him on purpose, and a doctor advised Savitri and Jatin to erase Jeet's memories so as to cure Jai. Sheila had been working with Jeet and helped him copy Jai's lifestyle and habits so that he could replace him after killing him. Jeet had also disclosed his identity to Savitri after stabbing her, due to which she told Jai to look for the box containing their photos. However, Jai gains consciousness due to having injected the adrenaline, and a brawl ensues, leading to Happi getting killed by Sheila and Jai getting thrown into the water, where he also discovers the corpse of Adit but manages to free himself. Jai holds Sheila on gunpoint and convinces Jeet that his falling from the cliff was merely an accident. He assures him that they will reunite before Sheila shoots Jeet, wounding him in the process, and then Sheila herself gets shot, leading to both dying. Jai finds some closure and returns to his mother's home. He comes across one of the family photos and attempts to use his ability again. His mother sees this and places a hand over the photo, stopping him. She consoles him, and he finally accepts that what happened was not his fault.

== Cast ==
- Akshay Kumar as Jai Puri / Jeet Puri (Dual Role)
- Ayesha Takia as Sheila Patel
- Sharmila Tagore as Savitri Puri
- Jaaved Jaaferi as Habibullah "Happi" Pasha
- Girish Karnad as Anil Sharma
- Anant Mahadevan as Sunder Puri
- Benjamin Gilani as Jatin Puri
- Rushad Rana as Adit Malhotra
- Pia Shah as Sally Kohli
- Darlene L'Archeveque as Paramedic
- Uttara Baokar as Bibiji

== Production ==
In March 2008, the cast and crew filmed in Calgary, Alberta, Canada and a few parts were noticed to be the Western Cape of South Africa.

Following initial delays due to visa and luggage problems, the film's budget increased more than expected. The film was further delayed because of the producers-distributors dispute with exhibitors over revenue-sharing terms and the IPL. The Guild had decided not to release any new films after 3 April, but paying heed to Percept Picture Company's request, decided that the strike would commence after 4 April facilitating the film's 3 April release.

Close to the release of the film, rumors spread that the release would be stalled due to certain misunderstandings between the producers Percept Picture Company and the music distributors T-Series. Cheques of Rs 66.7 million given by PPC to T Series bounced, giving rise to rumours that the film would not be released on the stipulated date. However, PPC CEO Navin Shah, confirmed that the cheques had bounced but also stated that a demand draft had already been given to the music partners and that film's release would be on schedule.

== Music ==
8 x 10 Tasveer

Soundtrack album by Salim–Sulaiman, Bohemia & Neeraj Shridhar
- Released: 14 March 2009
- Genre: Feature film soundtrack
- Length: 41:58
- Label: T-Series

Salim–Sulaiman chronology
Rab Ne Bana Di Jodi (2008)	8 x 10 Tasveer (2009)	Luck (2009)

The music was composed by Salim–Sulaiman, with lyrics by Neeraj Sridhar, Sameer and Irfan Siddiqui. The American rap artist Bohemia wrote, produced and sang the title song for Akshay Kumar.

The music's reception was average. Joginder Tuteja of Bollywood Hungama gave the music 2 out of 5 stars and said, "8x10 Tasveer has an average soundtrack with "Nazaara Hai" being the pick of the lot. The two romantic numbers do not go an extra distance though the solo rap song "I Got The Picture" does make for an interesting hear."

Track listing
No.	Title	Music	Artist(s)	Length
1.	"Nazaara Hai"	Salim–Sulaiman	Vishal Dadlani	4:19
2.	"Hafiz Khuda"	Salim-Sulaiman	Mohit Chauhan, Tulsi Kumar	4:38
3.	"Aaja Maahi"	Neeraj Shridhar	Neeraj Shridhar, Tulsi Kumar	4:19
4.	"I Got The Picture"	Bohemia	Bohemia; J.Hind	5:05
5.	"Kuch Iss Tarah"	Salim-Sulaiman	Mohit Chauhan, Tulsi Kumar	4:38
6.	"Hafiz Khuda" (Remix by DJ A-Myth)	Salim-Sulaiman	Mohit Chauhan, Tulsi Kumar	3:26
7.	"Nazaara Hai" (Remix by DJ A-Myth)	Salim-Sulaiman	Vishal Dadlani	4:30
8.	"Aaja Maahi" (remix by DJ A-Myth)	Neeraj Shridhar	Neeraj Shridhar, Tulsi Kumar	4:49
9.	"I Got The Picture" (Remix by DJ A-Myth)	Bohemia	Bohemia; J.Hind	2:46
10.	"Kuch Iss Tarah" (Remix by DJ A-Myth)	Salim-Sulaiman	Mohit Chauhan, Tulsi Kumar	3:24

== Release ==
The film was expected to lure audiences to theatres primarily because of a public holiday on 3 April, but the film failed to garner much appreciation and opened to a lowly 30%–40% start at major multiplexes across the country. The film was stiffly contested by Fast & Furious at the box office.

Filmmakers believe that the primary reasons for the film's disappointing run at the box office were the lack of a blockbuster soundtrack and a less targeted promotion. Vivek Agnihotri stated, "I saw the film in an empty theatre. One of the main reasons why I think the film didn't even take an opening is due to Akshay's brand promise, which is pure entertainment. I think makers couldn't exploit it. As a result, they not just wasted an opportunity but also annoyed viewers who love Akshay. Also, no one understood the genre of the film."

=== Box office ===
8 x 10 Tasveer grossed ₹235.8 million (equivalent to ₹590 million or US$6.2 million in 2023) worldwide. It was a disaster, yet Akshay Kumar commented that the film is one of his favourite films he had done.

=== Critical reception ===
The film was panned by critics. Taran Adarsh of Bollywood Hungama gave the film 1.5 out of 5, saying, "The film goes wrong, in fact horribly wrong, in the penultimate 20-25 minutes, which is the lifeline of any suspense-thriller. Nagesh Kukunoor has missed the bus this time!" Most of the critics criticized the second half of the movie. Rajeev Masand of CNN IBN also criticized the movie and rated it a 1/5. Nikhat Kazmi for The Times of India rated it an average 2/5, saying, "There's nothing really to cheer you up in the desultory proceedings, unless you want to watch chubby-cheeked Ayesha and lissome Akshay go mountain biking when he's not squirming in the time machine." Sashi Baliga from Hindustan Times also gave the movie a 2/5.
