= Trickbaby =

Trickbaby is a London based band, influenced by modern dance music and Indian Bollywood classics. They are based around the songwriting partnership of Saira Hussain and Steve Ager, and the rhythms of Vikaash Sankadecha. Lead singer Saira cites influences from modern Western music through to Bollywood movies.

== Career ==
Trickbaby's debut single, "Indie-Yarn" received mainstream media attention. It reached #46 in the UK Singles Chart, and was the first Hindi language single to be playlisted at BBC Radio One. Following media support for "Neelaa" after its inclusion on the Asian Flavas album, particularly at Radio One, Trickbaby released their debut album, Hanging Around on their own Chachaman label. Five stars in OK!, Mojo, and a good reviews in The Times, The Observer and in the main Asian press resulted in Trickbaby signing to EMI's Far East head office in Hong Kong. MTV in the SE Asia region made Trickbaby artist of the month on their "Alert" programme, and playlisted the band's self-produced "Slipping Through Your Fingers" video (which features members of the GB synchronised swimming team). Three Trickbaby songs were used in the cult Indian film Hyderabad Blues 2. Virgin UK released a compilation album, Asian Beat Bazaar, devised and compiled by Trickbaby and the band toured India, including a performance at MTV's Style Awards.

In 2006, Rohan Sippy asked the band for songs for his movie Bluffmaster, starring Abhishek Bachchan and Priyanka Chopra. "Sabse Bada Rupaiya/Bluffmaster", a Trickbaby track based around the original 1970's Mehmood song, became the title track, and a hit in the Indian diaspora. "Neelaa", "Indie-Yarn" and a reworked Hindi version of "Nine Parts Of Desire" also all had key roles in the film and featured on the soundtrack album.

Trickbaby wrote the title track to Ashok Thakeria's movie, Pyare Mohan, and they remixed two tracks for Victoria No. 203 (2007 film). The band spent 2007 finishing their second album, Chor Bazaar, named after a market in Mumbai famous for selling stolen goods. Featuring eleven songs and guest appearances by Gogol Bordello's Eugene Hutz, Sergey Ryabtzev (violin), and Yuri Lemeshev (accordion), as well as Marcella Detroit (harmonica).

To accompany Chor Bazaar the band made two videos. "To Fighter", an animation directed by Mox, and to a new version of "Nine Parts" ("Parde Ke Peeche" produced by Ramesh Sippy (director of Sholay)) and starring Bollywood's Abhishek Bachchan and Priyanka Chopra.

Their music video "Nine Parts" was also screened at Deejay Ra's music video night in Toronto, at the FILMI festival, North America's longest running South Asian film festival.

== Album discography ==
- Hanging Around (2004)
1. "Nine Parts Of Desire"
2. "Slipping Through Your Fingers"
3. "Neelaa"
4. "December Blues" (Aluminium Headz mix)
5. "Dildara"
6. "Three Minds"
7. "Hanging Around" (Aluminium Headz mix)
8. "Because you Know"
9. "Sea Of Stories"
10. "Lost Ones"
11. "54"
12. "SSS"
- Chor Bazaar (2008)
1. "Fighter"
2. "Crisis"
3. "Baja (featuring Marcella Detroit)"
4. "Light Up My Life"
5. "Babu"
6. "Drove A Chevvy To The Devi"
7. "Chor Bazaar (featuring Eugene Hutz, Sergey Ryabtzev and Yuri Lemeshev)"
8. "Mujay Tujay"
9. "Broken Dream"
10. "Nine Parts (Parde Ke Peeche)"
11. "Neelaa" (remix)
