= Lena Christensen =

Thai-Danish actress, television presenter and singer

Lena Christensen (Thai: ลีน่า คริสเตนเซ่น, born 1978) is a Thai-Danish actress, television presenter and singer. She starred in the films The Tesseract (2003) and SARS Wars (2004).

== Career ==
Christensen also starred Indian films by starring opposite Shreyas Talpade in Bombay to Bangkok, a Hindi film released in January 2008. In Thailand, she hosts an aerobics exercise television show and appears on a travel program. She released an album in 1997, Lena Body Beats, on GMM Grammy. For Bombay to Bangkok, Christensen was chosen from around 200 Thai actresses who auditioned for the role.

== Personal life ==
Christensen's elder sister, Piacher, is an actress and model in the 1990s.

== Filmography ==
Year	Title	Role	Ref.
2003	The Tesseract	Lita	
2004	SARS Wars	Dr. Diana	
2008	Bombay to Bangkok	Jasmine	
