= Mod (film) =

- Directed by: Nagesh Kukunoor
- Screenplay by: Nagesh Kukunoor
- Based on: Keeping Watch by Cheng Fen-fen
- Produced by: Sujit Kumar Singh; Elahe Hiptoola; Nagesh Kukunoor
- Starring: Ayesha Takia; Rannvijay Singh; Raghubir Yadav
- Cinematography: Chirantan Das
- Edited by: Sanjib Datta
- Music by: Tapas Relia
- Distributed by: Kukunoor Movies; Shreya Entertainment
- Release date: 14 October 2011
- Country: India
- Language: Hindi
- Box office: ₹63 lakh

Mod (Hindi pronunciation: ['moːɽ]; transl. Turn) is a 2011 Hindi romantic drama film directed by Nagesh Kukunoor. The film stars Ayesha Takia and Rannvijay Singh, Raghubir Yadav, Tanvi Azmi, and Anant Mahadevan. The film was released on 14 October 2011. The film is a remake of the 2007 Taiwanese film Keeping Watch.

== Plot ==
A 25-year-old woman named Ananya lives in a beautiful hill station called Ganga in Nilgiris district with her father, Ashok Mahadeo, and aunt, Gayatri Garg. Ashok is the head of the local Kishore Kumar fan club, while Gayatri runs a restaurant. Ananya's mother left home years ago to pursue her dreams. Ashok still waits for her to return. A local shopkeeper, Gangaram, to whom they owe money, has feelings for Ananya.

In order to support herself and her father, Ananya runs a watch repair store, where she meets a stranger named Andy. He comes every day to get his waterlogged watch repaired and leaves a ₹100 note in the form of an Origami swan. Andy claims to be her classmate from school and admits that he had a crush on her and had agreed to wait for 10 years to see her. She takes a liking to him and both hang out together while she attempts to deal with her creditor, Gangaram, and increasing pressure from R.K. Constructions, who want to build a resort in the area. Eventually, Ananya and Andy fall in love. However, Ananya's world shatters when she finds out that the real Andy died several years ago, and the man claiming to be him is actually an inmate at the local mental institute. The rest of the film traces the truth about the man impersonating Andy and Ananya's tribulations.

== Cast ==
- Ayesha Takia as Ananya Mahadeo
- Rannvijay Singh as Andy/Abhay
- Raghubir Yadav as Ashok Mahadeo
- Tanvi Azmi as Gayatri Garg
- Anant Mahadevan as Dr. Reddy
- Gulfam Khan as Nurse Kutty
- Prateeksha Lonkar as Mrs. Raymond
- Nakul Roshan Sahdev as young Andrew Raymond

== Music ==
The music for the film was composed by Tapas Relia.

No.	Title	Singer(s)	Length
1.	"Tu Hi Tu"	Shivam Pathak & Shreya Ghoshal	5:32
2.	"Ai Meri Jaaniya"	Shivam Pathak	4:14
3.	"Chand Pal Ke Hamsafar"	Shankar Mahadevan & Shreya Ghoshal	6:20
4.	"Aaj Main Ho Gayi Jawaan"	Raghubir, Shreya Ghoshal & Hrishikesh	4:49
5.	"Tu Hi Tu" (Unplugged)	Vijay Prakash	4:48
6.	"Aaj Main Ho Gayi Jawaan" (Remix)	Raghubir & Shreya Ghoshal	4:38
Total length:			29:01

== Reception ==
Taran Adarsh of Bollywood Hungama gave the film two out of five, writing, ″Ayesha Takia Azmi sparkles yet again in MOD. A truly wonderful performance! Contrary to his image, Rannvijay is cast as a sweet, quirky, sensitive, geeky guy here. And not just the character, but also his performance takes you by surprise. He nails it right this time. Raghubir Yadav is, as always, dependable. Tanvi Azmi shines as well. Anant Mahadevan is first-rate. Rushad Rana does well. Nikhil Ratnaparkhi excels. Prateeksha Lonkar appears in a cameo. On the whole, MOD appeals in bits and spurts. That's about it!″ A. Ganesh Nadar of Rediff.com gave the film two out five, writing ″It's a lovely story with great actors, and great scenery. What screws it up is the slow movement. You really have to have patience to watch the movie or be happy just to watch Ayesha. Wish director Nagesh Kukunoor had someone to tell him that slow and steady doesn't win races any more. You have to be fast and racy. A must-see for Ayesha fans; the rest can give it a miss.″ Aniruddha Guha of DNA gave the film two out of five, writing ″Mod doesn't work in totality, but has its moments. What it does, really, is remind you of the fact that Kukunoor is a filmmaker you can't ignore. Shunning technical flamboyance, he continues to tell stories in the more conventional mould, some which work, some which don't. You can expect him to stun you in the future.″

Shubhra Gupta of The Indian Express gave the film 1.5 out of 5, writing, ″It's so obvious that Andy is not who he says he is that you wonder why Kukunoor takes so long to get to the point. But then, he needs to pause to show off all the nice waterfalls and the rocks and the winding roads. The scenery is fine only for a bit, but then gets overtaken by situations which you can see a mile off. You know that that Andy is disturbed much before the doctor (Mahadevan) pronounces his diagnosis. The reason for his being the way he is unspools with no surprises. Takia is her familiar wholesome-girl-next-door but has to shoulder too much of the film, and Rannvijay is one-tone.″ Komal Nahta, editor of Koimoi.com quoted, "Mod will not be able to score at the ticket windows" and gave it one star. Anuj Kumar of The Hindu wrote, "After Tasveer and Aashayen, Nagesh Kukunoor once again sets the mood well, but falters when it comes to taking the leap of faith. Set in a quaint hill station, Mod has some interesting characters and endearing moments, but as a whole it is a film that outlives its welcome once its central conflict becomes clear."
