= Hyderabad Blues =

1997 film by Nagesh Kukunoor

- Directed by: Nagesh Kukunoor
- Written by: Nagesh Kukunoor
- Produced by: Nagesh Kukunoor
- Starring: Nagesh Kukunoor; Rajashree; Elahe Hiptoola; Anoop Ratnaker Rao
- Cinematography: C. Ramprasad
- Edited by: K. Ramesh
- Music by: Bunty
- Production company: Kukunoor Movies
- Release dates: November 1997 (Mumbai); 17 July 1998 (India)
- Running time: 85 minutes
- Country: India
- Language: English
- Budget: ₹12 lakh

Hyderabad Blues is a 1997 Indian drama film written, directed, and produced by Nagesh Kukunoor. The film explores culture clash from an Indian American's perspective, vacationing back home in Hyderabad, India and finding himself a foreigner in his own land. The film starred non-mainstream actors, including Kukunoor in his directorial and acting debut, as well as his family members and friends. The film heralded new age Indian independent cinema.

The dialogue of Hyderabad Blues is primarily in English with some Telugu and Hindi spoken as well. The film premiered at the Eros International Mini Theatre, Mumbai; the Denver Film Festival, the "View From Abroad" section of the First MAMI Film Festival; as well as the National Centre for the Performing Arts in Mumbai. It was premiered as a three part television series in Doordarshan.

Hyderabad Blues garnered the "Audience Award for best film" at the Peachtree International Film Festival in Atlanta, as well as the Rhode Island International Film Festival. In 2018, Hyderabad Blues, celebrated its 20th anniversary with a special screening in Mumbai by "Drishyam Films" where it was featured in the "Indie Film Masters" edition. Hyderabad Blues was followed up by its direct sequel Hyderabad Blues 2 which was released in 2004.

== Plot ==
The film revolves around Varun and his visit to his homeland after 12 years in the USA and his resulting culture shock. Varun's attempts to romance an Indian doctor and balance the local customs of arranged marriage with the Western tradition of dating.

== Cast ==
- Nagesh Kukunoor as Varun Naidu
- Rajashree as Ashwini Rao
- Elahe Hiptoola as Seema Rao
- Vikram Inamdar as Sanjeev Rao
- Anoop Ratnaker Rao as Harish Chandani
- D V Ramana as Darshan Naidu
- Revathi Alwar as Kusuma Naidu
- Anne Chengappa as Shashi Naidu
- Zain-Ul-Wara Zaheer as Sandhya

== Production ==
In producing the film, Nagesh Kukunoor invested the money he made from his engineering career in the United States. It was made on a shoe-string budget of Rs. 1.7 million (roughly equivalent to U.S. $ 40,000) and shot in 17 days entirely in Hyderabad, India.

== Release and reception ==
The film had its premiere at Mumbai Film Festival in November 1997. According to Sharmila Taliculam of Rediff, the film got "rave reviews" at the festival was touted as "the find of the MFF."

Suparn Verma of Rediff.com, wrote, "The low budget film lacks technical finesse, but covers a lot of mistakes with some inventive dialogues and screenplay. The characters are well etched and quite engaging. The surprise package of the film is Vikram Inamdar, who has done a magnificent job of an easygoing guy whose unquestioningly accepts things, annoying the protagonist time and again." Anupama Chopra of India Today wrote, "The actors are almost all non-professionals - Kukunoor, unable to afford a leading man, plays hero himself. But his writing makes up for the lack of finesse. Though stacked with stereotypes, the film has some genuinely funny moments."

The film performed well commercially. According to Anna M. M. Vetticad of India Today, the film ran for 31 weeks in Mumbai and 28 weeks in Hyderabad and Bangalore.
