= Rockford (film) =

1999 film by Nagesh Kukunoor

- Theatrical release poster
- Directed by: Nagesh Kukunoor
- Written by: Nagesh Kukunoor
- Produced by: Padmini Kolhapure; Elahe Hiptoola; Nagesh Kukunoor
- Starring: Nagesh Kukunoor; Nandita Das; Rohan Dey; Kailash Atmanathan; Ulrika Krishnamurthy; Imran Mirza
- Cinematography: C. Ramprasad
- Edited by: Renu Saluja
- Music by: Shankar–Ehsaan–Loy; Lesle Lewis
- Production company: SIC Productions
- Distributed by: Padmini Films
- Release date: 7 October 1999
- Running time: 102 minutes
- Country: India
- Language: English

Rockford is a 1999 Indian English-language, coming-of-age drama film written, and directed by Nagesh Kukunoor, who also co-produced the film alongside Padmini Kolhapure and Elahe Hiptoola. The film starred Nagesh Kukonoor, Nandita Das, and Rohan Dey in pivotal roles. The film received positive reviews.

== Plot ==
Thirteen-year-old Rajesh Naidu arrives at Rockford Boys' High School. Having left home for the first time he is a bit sad. Rajesh's best friends are Selva, a good spirited boy, and David, an arrogant sports hero but with a good heart. The captain of the school – Raja, hates Rajesh. At school, Rajesh experiences the joy and agony of living in an all-male boarding school, learning to fend for himself without the safety net of his parents. There he befriends PT Instructor Johnny Matthew, who teaches Rajesh a lot of lessons of life.

One day the school arranges a fete in which the girls also participate every year, and all the boys are to propose at least one girl. Rajesh is least interested, but goes anyway on Selva's insistence. Unfortunately, David gets hurt and cannot go to the fete. Hence he tells Rajesh to give a card to Malathi, a student from the girls school. But Malathi becomes attracted to Rajesh which David takes in his stride easily.

On Rajesh's birthday, Mr. Matthew pretending to be Malathi's uncle, brings her out of the school to meet Rajesh. This information is then passed on to the headmaster, Brother Lawrence. Shravya, Malati's friend also accompanies them. Malathi and Rajesh spends some time together, sharing their first kiss. Shravya and Mr. Matthew go together for an Ice-Cream. She then accuses Johnny of having assaulted her when they were alone, which is in fact a lie fabricated by Raja. Brother Lawrence, believing the lie to be true asks Mr. Matthew to resign from the school. Rajesh gets bewildered by this and fights Raja with the help of David, and makes him confess the truth in front of Brother Lawrence. Johnny Matthew then gets reinstated and everything ends well.

== Cast ==
- Rohan Dey as Rajesh Naidu
- Kailash Athmanathan as Selva Reddy
- Nagesh Kukunoor as Johnny Matthew (PT Instructor)
- Ulrika Krishnamurti as Malathi
- Imran Mirza as David Fischer
- Jayant Kripalani as Brother Lawrence
- Maj Vijayakumar R as Coach Velu
- Vipin V Kumar as K Senthil aka Didly
- Shilpa Pai as Shravya
- Suhail Bajaj as Raja
- Nandita Das as Lily Vegas
- Debasakti Mohapatra as Happy
- Sohrab Ardeshir

== Soundtrack ==
Rockford

Soundtrack album by Shankar–Ehsaan–Loy, Lesle Lewis
- Released: 1999 (India)
- Genre: Feature film soundtrack
- Label: Sony BMG

Shankar–Ehsaan–Loy, Lesle Lewis chronology
Rockford (1999)	Bhopal Express (1999)

#	Song	Singer(s)	Duration
1	Aasman Ke Paar	Shankar Mahadevan	6:15
2	Rockford Theme	Ashirvad	3:35
3	Find Me	Malvika	2:55
4	Comatose	Uday Benegal	3:05
5	Vegas Theme	Ashirvad	2:05
6	Feels So Good	Hariharan, Lesle Lewis	4:59
7	Make Merry	John Sudhakar, Ashirvad, Malvika	4:51
8	Yaaron	K.K., Lesle Lewis	4:32

== Release ==
It was released on 5 November 1999 in India. It was also screened at 2018 MAMI Film Festival.

== Reception ==
A critic from India Today wrote, "Rockford is about real people and the things boys do and that's where it scores". Sharmila Taliculum of Rediff.com wrote, "The success of Hyderabad Blues must have raised a lot of expectations, but Rockford does not live up to those".
