= Nagesh Kukunoor =

Indian film actor, director and producer

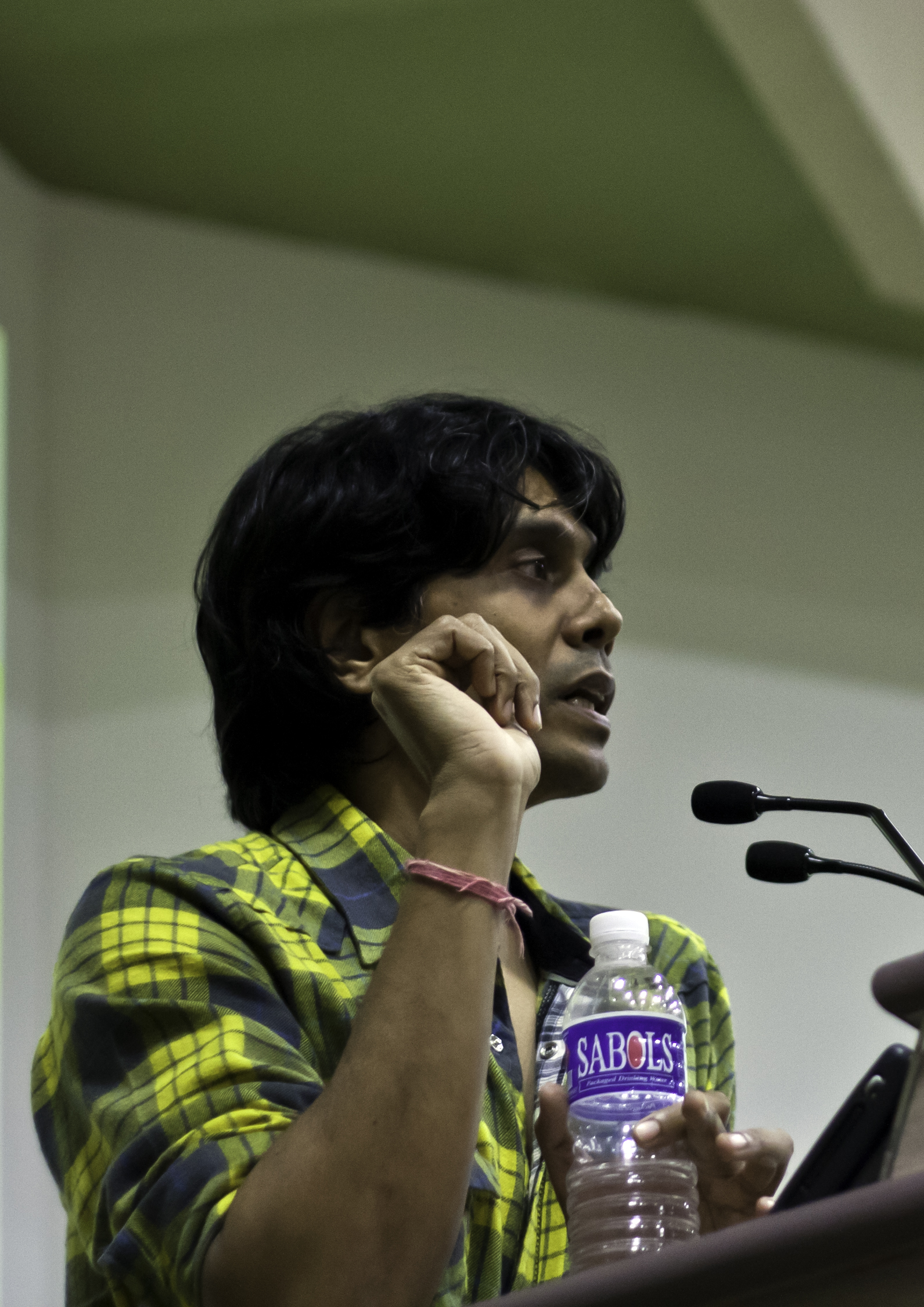
- Kukunoor at Saarang 2011, IIT Madras cultural festival
- Born: Nagesh Kukunoor Naidu; 30 March 1967 (age 59); Hyderabad, Andhra Pradesh (present-day Telangana), India
- Education: Georgia Institute of Technology; Warehouse Actors Theater; Osmania University
- Occupations: Film director, actor

Nagesh Kukunoor (born 30 March 1967) is an Indian film director, producer, screenwriter and actor known for his works predominantly in Hindi cinema, and few Telugu films. He is known for his works in parallel cinema, such as Hyderabad Blues (1997), Rockford (1999), Iqbal (2005), Dor (2006), Aashayein (2010), Lakshmi (2014), and Dhanak (2016). Kukunoor has received seven International Awards, and two National Film Awards for his works.

In 2003, he directed 3 Deewarein, which was showcased among the Indian panorama section, at the 2003 International Film Festival of India. The film was also premiered at the Kolkata Film Festival. After having been screened at the Indian Film Festival of Los Angeles, where it was well received, the film was screened at the Commonwealth Festival at Manchester. It was nominated as one of the top five films, at the gala presentation. Nagesh Kukunoor has also received the Filmfare Award for Best Story.

In 2006, he garnered the National Film Award for Best Film on Other Social Issues, for directing Iqbal. In 2014, he received the Mercedes Benz Audience Award, for Best Narrative at the Palm Springs International Film Festival for Lakshmi. In 2015 he directed the road movie, Dhanak, which won the Crystal Bear Grand Prix for Best Children's Film, and Special Mention for the Best Feature Film by The Children's Jury for Generation Kplus at the 65th Berlin International Film Festival. The film has also garnered the Best Film Award in the main category-Children's Feature Film Competition-Cinema in Sneakers (film festival), and the Best Film Award – at the Montreal International Children's Film Festival (FIFEM). The film has garnered the National Film Award for Best Children's Film for 2016.

== Early life and education ==
Nagesh Kukunoor was born in Hyderabad to Kusuma and Sudarshan. Kukunoor's mother tongue is Telugu, and as a child he loved watching Telugu, Hindi, and English films in the theatres of his neighbourhood, Narayanguda. He studied at Montfort School, Yercaud. Nagesh Kukunoor attended Osmania University in Hyderabad, India and received his bachelor's degree in chemical engineering. He moved to Atlanta, Georgia in the United States in 1988, and completed his master's degree in environmental engineering at Georgia Institute of Technology. After graduating from Georgia Tech, he went to work as an environmental consultant at Trinity Consultants in Texas, then in Atlanta, during which he attended workshops in film. He studied acting and direction at the Warehouse Actor's Theater in Atlanta.

== Film career ==
He invested the money he made from his engineering career in USA in producing the film Hyderabad Blues. It is based on a script that he wrote in Atlanta dealing with Indians returning home from the United States of America. He directed and acted in the movie. It had a budget of Rs. 1.7 million (roughly equivalent to US$40,000) and was shot in 17 days. It was perceived by Sanjay Arora, an independent film maker, to be realistic and one of the first movies to use Hyderabadi Urdu correctly. It became the most successful independent film in India. The film was featured at Peachtree International Film Festival in Atlanta and Rhode Island International Film Festival.

=== Later features ===
3 Deewarein (2003) premiered at the Kolkata Film Festival. In contrast to his earlier work, it had a budget of ₹21 million (US$220,000) and featured established actors including Naseeruddin Shah, Juhi Chawla and Jackie Shroff.

In 2006, Nagesh Kukunoor wrote and directed Dor, a drama film featuring Ayesha Takia, Gul Panag and Shreyas Talpade as the lead actors. Nagesh also acted in the film, playing businessman Chopra. The film is about two women who come from different backgrounds and how fate brings them together. Meera (Ayesha Takia), a young woman who becomes a widow shortly after marriage, is trapped by tradition. Zeenat (Gul Panag), on the other hand, faces the daunting task of saving the life of her husband, who is on trial for murder. A bahuroopiya (Shreyas Talpade) helps her reach Meera, who holds the "string" to Zeenat's hope. The companionship that develops between Meera and Zeenat results in redemption for both. The film was well received by both the critics and film buffs.

His film Iqbal, featuring Shreyas Talpade and Naseeruddin Shah, received critical praise and earned him recognition in the Hindi film industry.

His next film 8 x 10 Tasveer, an action-thriller featuring Akshay Kumar in the lead role fared poorly at the box office but was considered to be Nagesh's most self-reflective work to date. "I like to cast characters who are close to me. And this one gets as close to me as possible. I was once an environmental consultant. Akshay plays the part of an environment protection officer," Kukunoor said in an April 2009 interview.

In 2015, at the 65th Berlin International Film Festival, his feature Dhanak won The Grand Prix of the Generation Kplus International Jury for the best feature-length film, and received a Special Mention by Children's Jury in Generation Kplus Section.

== Filmography ==
=== Films ===
Year	Film	Director	Producer	Screenwriter	Actor	Language	Notes
1997	Hyderabad Blues	Yes	Yes	Yes	Yes	English	
1999	Rockford	Yes		Yes	Yes	English	
2001	Bollywood Calling	Yes		Yes	Yes	English	
2002	3 Deewarein	Yes		Yes	Yes	Hindi	Filmfare Award for Best Story
2004	Hyderabad Blues 2	Yes	Yes	Yes	Yes	English	Nominated for "Best Performance in an Indian English Film" at Screen Weekly Awards
2005	Iqbal	Yes		Yes		Hindi	National Film Award for Best Film on Other Social Issues; Nominated for Filmfare Award for Best Director
2006	Dor	Yes		Yes	Yes	Hindi	
2008	Bombay to Bangkok	Yes		Yes		Hindi	
2009	8 x 10 Tasveer	Yes		Yes		Hindi	
2010	Aashayein	Yes		Yes		Hindi	
2011	Mod	Yes	Yes	Yes		Hindi	
2014	Lakshmi	Yes	Yes	Yes	Yes	Hindi	Mercedes Benz Audience Award for Best Narrative at the Palm Springs International Film Festival
2016	Dhanak	Yes	Yes	Yes		Hindi	The Grand Prix, for the best feature-length film, and Special Mention for the Best Feature Film by The Children's Jury for Generation Kplus, 65th Berlin International Film Festival; Best Film Award in the main category – Children's Feature Film Competition – at the Cinema in Sneakers Children's Festival in Poland; National Film Award for Best Children's Film
2022	Good Luck Sakhi	Yes		Yes		Telugu	

=== Television ===
Year	Title	Director	Screenwriter	Actor	Language	Notes	Ref.
2019–2021	City of Dreams	Yes	Yes		Hindi	Hotstar series; 2 seasons, 20 episodes	
2022	Modern Love Hyderabad	Yes	Yes		Telugu	Prime Video series; 3 episodes	
2025	Paatal Lok (season 2)			Yes	Hindi	Prime Video	
2025	The Hunt - The Rajiv Gandhi Assassination Case	Yes	Yes		Hindi	SonyLIV	
2025	Mrs. Deshpande	Yes	Yes		Hindi	JioHotstar	

== Awards ==
National Film Awards

- Best Film on Other Social Issues – Iqbal – 2006
- Best Children's Film – Dhanak – 2016

International Awards

- Audience Award for best film at the Peachtree International Film Festival in Atlanta, Georgia – Hyderabad Blues – 1999
- Audience Award for best film at the Rhode Island International Film Festival – Hyderabad Blues – 1999
- Best Film – Mercedes Benz Audience Award, for Best Narrative at the Palm Springs International Film Festival – Lakshmi – 2014
- Dhanak (2015)
  - The Grand Prix, for the best feature-length film – at the 65th Berlin International Film Festival
  - Special Mention for the Best Feature Film by The Children's Jury for Generation Kplus at the 65th Berlin International Film Festival
  - Best Film Award in the main category-Children's Feature Film Competition-Cinema in Sneakers (film festival)
  - Best Film Award – at the Montreal International Children's Film Festival (FIFEM)

Filmfare Awards

- Filmfare Award for Best Story – 3 Deewarein – 2004

Other Awards

- Teacher's Achievement Award for Creative and Performing Arts – 2002
