= Rising Star (Indian TV series) season 3 =

Indian Television show

Rising Star
- Season 3
- No. of episodes: 24

Release
- Original network: Colors TV
- Original release: 16 March – 8 June 2019

Season chronology
- ← Previous; Season 2

Rising Star is the third Indian version of the international franchise series Rising Star, a reality television singing competition. It is based on the Israeli singing competition HaKokhav HaBa (meaning The Next Star) made by Keshet Broadcasting Ltd.

The program format lets the viewers vote for contestants live via the television channel's mobile app Voot. The show premiered on 16 March 2019 on Colors TV. Playback singer and music director Shankar Mahadevan and actor-singer Diljit Dosanjh return as the experts and are joined by playback singer Neeti Mohan in this season. The show was hosted by playback singer Aditya Narayan.

== Format ==
In contrast to other singing competition TV shows which feature a cast of celebrity judges, Rising Star features a cast of celebrity experts and considers the viewers at home the judges. During each performance, the audience at home is able to decide in real time whether or not a contestant is sent through to the next round by using a mobile voting app.

While the viewers at home are considered the "judges", the expert panelists also may influence the vote but with continuously decreasing percentage votes over the total public vote and not exceeding 5% of the total voting power.

=== The Auditions ===
The first round where the acts are individually called to perform. As a reportage of the announced performer is shown, viewers are invited to register for voting for that specific act. Following a countdown of three seconds, the candidate has to start performing behind a screen called "The Wall".

With start of performance, the voting kicks in. Registered voters have the option of voting just "Yes" or "No". Non-votes are also considered "No" votes. If an expert votes "Yes", another 5% is added to the tally of the contestant. The contestants also see random photos of voters in their favour. Faces of panelists voting "Yes" are also shown in larger frames.

Once the contestant reaches 80% of "Yes" votes, the wall is raised and the contestant goes to the next round of the competition.

=== The Duels ===
Contestants who make it through the auditions are paired by the judges to face off in a duel. The first contestant sings with the wall up and sets the benchmark for the second contestant. The second contestant sings with the wall down. If the second contestant betters the first contestant's vote total, the wall rises and the second contestant was through to the next round while the first contestant is eliminated; if the second contestant fails to raise the wall, the second contestant is eliminated and the first contestant goes through.

== Live auditions ==
Color key

Advanced to Duels Ki Takkar Round

Eliminated from Rising Star 3

Highest votes

Lowest votes of episode and Advanced

The Live auditions began from 10 March 2019 on the grand finale of Fear Factor: Khatron Ke Khiladi 9.

Episode Date	Contestant	Age (in years)	City	State	Song	Votes	Notes	Expert's			Guests	Result
Episode Date	Contestant	Age (in years)	City	State	Song	Votes	Notes	Shankar Mahadevan	Neeti Mohan	Diljit Dosanjh	Guests	Result
10 Mar	Abhishek Saraph	21	Solapur	Maharashtra	Khamoshiyaan + Mon Majhi Re	95%					N/A	Advanced
16 Mar	Radhika Mishra	08	Bhopal	Madhya Pradesh	Mai Badhiya Tu Bhi Badhiya+Mere Piya Gaye Rangoon	90%	Sister of Amit Mishra (singer).				N/A	Advanced
16 Mar	Salamat Ali	35	Matoi	Punjab	Jugni	91%					N/A	Advanced
16 Mar	Suparna Panda	19	Midnapore	West Bengal	Dilbaro	88%					N/A	Advanced
16 Mar	Saimann Sewa	15	Darjeeling	West Bengal	Mere Naam Tu	91%	He was a Contestant of Sa Re Ga Ma Pa Li'l Champs 2017				N/A	Advanced
16 Mar	Usha Timothy	70	Mumbai	Maharashtra	Aaj Phir Jeene Ki Tamanna Hai	94%	She is a playback singer.				N/A	Advanced
16 Mar	Animesh Sharma	26	Rangiya	Assam	Bol Do Na Zara	97%	He also participated in Dil Hai Hindustani (season 2). Highest Percentage in 3 Seasons				N/A	Advanced
16 Mar	Dee M C	25	Kalyan	Maharashtra	Periods	83%	Rapper				N/A	Advanced
17 Mar	Mansi Sisodiya	14	Delhi	Delhi	Dil Haara	95%						Advanced
17 Mar	Aftab Singh	13	Faridkot	Punjab	Re Sultan	95%	He was a Contestant of Sa Re Ga Ma Pa Li'l Champs 2017					Advanced
17 Mar	Diljot Singh	14	Sangrur	Punjab	Kar Har Maidan Fateh	93%						Advanced
17 Mar	Vishwaja Jadhav	09	Virar	Maharashtra	Aawara Bhawre	89%						Advanced
17 Mar	Shubham Lodhi	24	Jalandhar	Punjab	Lagan Lagi	93%						Advanced
17 Mar	Veer Dahiya	33	Gurgaon	Haryana	Teri Aankhya ka Kajal	32%						Eliminated
17 Mar	Puja Chowdhary	19	Kolkata	West Bengal	Soona Soona	96%						Advanced
23 Mar	Sanjay Satish	25	Calicut	Kerala	Mitwa	93%					N/A	Advanced
23 Mar	Padmanav Bordoloi	29	Guwahati	Assam	Chunar	90%					N/A	Advanced
23 Mar	Swaraag Band	21-42	Jaipur	Rajasthan	Ghoomar	92%					N/A	Advanced
23 Mar	Ashmani Kundu	29	Dum Dum	West Bengal	Namak Ishq Ka	89%					N/A	Advanced
23 Mar	Kunal Bojewar & Shikhar Rastogi	23, 24	Gwalior, Lucknow	Madhya Pradesh, Uttar Pradesh	Tera Yaar Hoon Main	87%					N/A	Advanced
23 Mar	Diwakar Sharma	26	Delhi	Delhi	Aai Zindagi	95%	He was first runner-up in Sa Re Ga Ma Pa L'il Champs (Season 1).				N/A	Advanced
23 Mar	Chow Oupseng Namchum	07	Chowkham	Arunachal Pradesh	Sar Jo Tera Chakraye	96%					N/A	Advanced
24 Mar	Surtal Kulaar	20	Khanna	Punjab	Tere Bin Nahi Lagda	92%					N/A	Advanced
24 Mar	Amritha Rajan	22	Calicut	Kerala	Kehna Hi Kya	91%					N/A	Advanced
24 Mar	Zuber Hashmi	30	Sultanpur	Uttar Pradesh	Aaj Ibadat	90%	He was a contestant of Sa Re Ga Ma Pa (2016).				N/A	Advanced
24 Mar	Ananya Nanda	17	Bhubaneswar	Odisha	Dhadak Title Track	93%	She was the winner of Indian Idol Junior (season 2).				N/A	Advanced
24 Mar	Prativa Dutta	15	Dakshineswar	West Bengal	Hawa Hawai	94%					N/A	Advanced
24 Mar	Chetan Brijwasi	12	Mathura	Uttar Pradesh	Jee Karda	86%	He was semifinalist in Rising Star (Indian season 2).				N/A	Advanced
24 Mar	Rehmat Ali	31	Phillaur	Punjab	Aaj Din Chadeya	89%					N/A	Advanced
30 Mar	Swastika Thakur	35	Nagpur	Maharashtra	Agar Tum Sath Ho	94%					N/A	Advanced
30 Mar	Konkan Kanya	20-37	Konkan	Maharashtra	London Thumakda + Navrayi Majhi	91%					N/A	Advanced
30 Mar	Adriza Chakraborty	32	Kolkata	West Bengal	Aao Huzur Tumko	89%					N/A	Advanced

== Duels ki Takkar ==
Color key

Advanced

Eliminated

Episode Date	Order	Contestant	Song	Votes	Notes	Expert's			Guests	Result
Episode Date	Order	Contestant	Song	Votes	Notes	Shankar Mahadevan	Neeti Mohan	Diljit Dosanjh	Guests	Result
30 Mar	1	Suparna Panda	Chupke Se	90%					N/A	Advanced
30 Mar	1	Usha Timothy	Lag Ja Gale Se	81%					N/A	Eliminated
30 Mar	2	Radhika Mishra	Yeh Ishq Haye	82%					N/A	Eliminated
30 Mar	2	Vishwaja Jadhav	Teri Galiyan	94%	She got 59% because of Technical Error during Live Votings. She performed again and got 94%.				N/A	Advanced
31 Mar	1	Ashmani Kundu	Ab Ke Sawan	66%					N/A	Eliminated
31 Mar	1	Animesh Sharma	Muskurane Ki Wajah	95%					N/A	Advanced
31 Mar	2	Harman Singh	Ruth Aa Gai Re	89%					N/A	Eliminated
31 Mar	2	Aftab Singh	Layi vi Na Gai	94%					N/A	Advanced
31 Mar	3	Saimann Sewa	Channa Mereya	89%					N/A	Advanced
31 Mar	3	Kunal & Shikhar	Gulabi Aankhein + Phir Mohabbat	85%					N/A	Eliminated
31 Mar	3	Sanjay Satish	Tu Hi Re	88%					N/A	Advanced
6 Apr	1	Mansi Sisodiya	Chhap Tilak	88%						Eliminated
6 Apr	1	Rehmat Ali	Dil Da Mamla	92%						Advanced
6 Apr	2	Salamat Ali	Dama Dam	85%						Advanced
6 Apr	2	Puja Chowdhary	Sapno Se Bhare Naina	68%						Eliminated
6 Apr	3	Swaraag Band	Sawan Mein + Rajasthani Folk	87%						Eliminated
6 Apr	3	Swastika Thakur	Rangeela Re	90%						Advanced
7 Apr	1	Konkan Kanya	Radha Teri + Badri Ki Dulhaniya	85%					N/A	Advanced
7 Apr	1	Surtal Kulaar	Enna Sona	76%					N/A	Eliminated
7 Apr	2	Diwakar Sharma	Samjhawan	93%					N/A	Advanced
7 Apr	2	Padmanav Bordoloi	Saawariya	82%					N/A	Eliminated
7 Apr	3	Amritha Rajan	Sun Raha Hai Na Tu	90%					N/A	Advanced
7 Apr	3	Prativa Dutta	Gulaabo	87%					N/A	Eliminated
13 Apr	1	Ananya Nanda	Hay Rama	91%					N/A	Advanced
13 Apr	1	Dee M C	Jagga Jiteya	69%					N/A	Eliminated
13 Apr	2	Abhishek Saraph	Ae Dil Hai Mushkil	94%					N/A	Advanced
13 Apr	2	Zuber Hashmi	Mast Magan	79%					N/A	Eliminated
13 Apr	3	Chow Oupseng Namchum	Baar Baar Dekho	93%					N/A	Advanced
13 Apr	3	Chetan Brijwasi	Dil Cheez Tujhe Dedi	79%	India's Favourite 16 was made India's Favourite 17 for Chetan Brijwasi on the request of experts.				N/A	Advanced
13 Apr	4	Adriza Chakraborty	Aaiye Meharbaan	85%					N/A	Advanced
13 Apr	4	Shubham Lodhi	Jag Ghoomeya	82%					N/A	Eliminated

== Grand Premiere ==
=== Episode 10: 14 April 2019 ===
This round had no voting and elimination. Voting for song selection was done for Shankar Mahadevan and Ananya Nanda. Ananya selected song:"Bumbro Bumbro" and Shankar Mahadevan selected "Maahi Ve" and audience voted. Maximum audience selected "Maahi Ve" and both sang the song.

Order No	Contestants			Companion		Song
1	Salamat Ali	Rehmat Ali				Dulhe Ka Sehra
2	Konkan Kanya					Aankhon Ki Gustakhiya + Ye Kaali Kaali Aankhen
3	Chow Oupseng Namchum	Vishwaja Jadhav				Ladaka Bada Anjaana Hai
4	Ananya Nanda			Shankar Mahadevan		Maahi Ve, Bumbro Bumbro
5	Diwakar Sharma	Amritha Rajan	Sanjay Satish			Chura Ke Dil Mera
6	Animesh Sharma	Abhishek Saraph		Neeti Mohan		Mera Dil Bhi Kitna Pagal Hai
7	Aftab Singh	Chetan Brijwasi		Diljit Dosanjh		Chalo Ishq Ladaaye
8	Saimann Sewa			Aditya Narayan	Dhvani Bhanushali	Woh Ladki Jo Sabse Alag Hai + Main Khiladi Tu Anari
9	Suparna Panda	Swastika Thakur	Adriza Chakraborty			Dil Hai Ke Manta Nahin

== Salam-E-Rekha ==
=== Episode 11: 21 April 2019 ===
Order	Contestant	Song	Votes	Expert's			Result
Order	Contestant	Song	Votes	Neeti Mohan	Rekha	Diljit Dosanjh	Result
1	Ananya Nanda	Salaam-E-Ishq Meri Jaan	92.3%				Advanced
1	Abhishek Saraph	Salaam-E-Ishq Meri Jaan	92.3%				Advanced
2	Aftab Singh	Rang Barse	92.9%				Advanced
2	Rehmat Ali	Rang Barse	92.9%				Advanced
3	Chetan Brijwasi	Tere Rab Ne Bana Di Jodi	87%				Advanced
3	Chow Oupseng Namchum	Tere Rab Ne Bana Di Jodi	87%				Advanced
3	Vishwaja Jadhav	Tere Rab Ne Bana Di Jodi	87%				Advanced
4	Amritha Rajan	Kaisi Paheli Zindagani	86%				Advanced
4	Adriza Chakraborty	Kaisi Paheli Zindagani	86%				Advanced
5	Suparna Panda	Dekha Ek Khwaab	93%				Advanced
5	Animesh Sharma	Dekha Ek Khwaab	93%				Advanced
6	Saimann Sewa	Pardesiya	79%				Eliminated
6	Swastika Thakur	Pardesiya	79%				Eliminated
7	Konkan Kanya	Man Kyu Behka + Naam Re	88%				Advanced
7	Salamat Ali	Man Kyu Behka + Naam Re	88%				Advanced
8	Diwakar Sharma	Agar Tum Na Hote	94%				Advanced
8	Sanjay Satish	Agar Tum Na Hote	94%				Advanced

Color key

Advanced

Eliminated

== Summer Camp & Bachpan ke Din ==
=== Episode 12: 27 April 2019 ===
Order	Contestant	Song	Votes	Expert's			Result
Order	Contestant	Song	Votes	Shankar Mahadevan	Neeti Mohan	Diljit Dosanjh	Result
1	Ananya Nanda	Albela Sajan Aayo Re	89%				Advanced
2	Abhishek Saraph	Abhi Mujh Mein Kahin	91%				Advanced
3	Chow Oupseng Namchum	Chota Bachcha Jaan Ke	88%				Advanced
4	Chetan Brijwasi	Yeh Jawani Hai Deewani	77%				Eliminated
5	Salamat Ali	Tu Maane Ya Na Maane (Folk song)	87%				Advanced
6	Adriza Chakraborty	Mera Naam Chin Chin Chu	82%				Advanced
7	Animesh Sharma	Roke Na Ruke Naina	94%				Advanced

Color key

Advanced

Eliminated

=== Episode 13: 28 April 2019 ===
Order	Contestant	Song	Votes	Expert's			Result
Order	Contestant	Song	Votes	Shankar Mahadevan	Neeti Mohan	Diljit Dosanjh	Result
1	Aftab Singh	Arziyan	94%				Advanced
2	Amritha Rajan	Mere Dholna Sun	86%				Advanced
3	Vishwaja Jadhav	Dil Hai Chhota Sa	84%				Advanced
4	Rehmat Ali	Ye Hausla	88%				Advanced
5	Sanjay Satish	Tere Bina Besuadi	91%				Advanced
6	Diwakar Sharma	Masakali	94%				Advanced
7	Konkan Kanya	Intehan Ho Gai + Piya Tu	81%				Advanced
8	Suparna Panda	16 Baras Ki	77%				Eliminated

Color key

Advanced

Eliminated

== Fully Filmy ==
=== Episode 14: 4 May 2019 ===
Order	Contestant	Song	Votes	Expert's			Result
Order	Contestant	Song	Votes	Shankar Mahadevan	Neeti Mohan	Diljit Dosanjh	Result
1	Chow Oupseng Namchum	Mera Joota Hai Japani	88%				Advanced
2	Konkan Kanya	Dola Re Dola	77%				Eliminated
3	Diwakar Sharma	Main Hoon Don	90%				Advanced
4	Sanjay Satish	Deva Shree Ganesha	90%				Advanced
5	Aftab Singh	Maula Mere Le Le Meri Jaan	93%				Advanced
6	Adriza Chakraborty	Kate Nahi Kat Te	88%				Advanced
7	Ananya Nanda	Deewani Mastani	90%				Advanced

Color key

Advanced

Eliminated

=== Episode 15: 5 May 2019 ===
Order	Contestant	Song	Votes	Expert's			Result
Order	Contestant	Song	Votes	Shankar Mahadevan	Neeti Mohan	Diljit Dosanjh	Result
1	Amritha Rajan	Sun Saathiya	89%				Advanced
2	Rehmat Ali	Lagan Laagi Tum Se	86%				Advanced
3	Vishwaja Jadhav	Yeh Hasin Waadiyan	84%				Eliminated
4	Abhishek Saraph	Aake Seedhi Lage	89%				Advanced
5	Animesh Sharma	Suno Na Sangemarmar	93%				Advanced
6	Salamat Ali	Mere Rashke Qamar	87%				Advanced

Color key

Advanced

Eliminated

== Lakshmikant-Pyarelal Songs & Parents Special ==
=== Episode 16: 11 May 2019 ===
Order	Contestant	Song	Votes	Expert's			Guests	Result
Order	Contestant	Song	Votes	Shankar Mahadevan	Neeti Mohan	Diljit Dosanjh	Guests	Result
1	Abhishek Saraph	Parda Hai Parda	92%					Advanced
2	Amritha Rajan	Tere Mere Beech Mein	90%					Advanced
3	Rehmat Ali	Lambi Judai	72%					Eliminated
4	Ananya Nanda	Hungama Ho Gaya	86%					Advanced
5	Aftab Singh	Khuda Gawah	92%					Advanced
6	Sanjay Satish	Ek Haseena Thi	93%					Advanced

Color key

Advanced
Eliminated

=== Episode 17: 12 May 2019 ===
Order	Contestant	Song	Votes	Expert's			Result
Order	Contestant	Song	Votes	Shankar Mahadevan	Neeti Mohan	Diljit Dosanjh	Result
1	Diwakar Sharma	Tujhse Naraz Nahi Zindagi	95%				Advanced
2	Chow Oupseng Namchum	Lakdi Ki Kathi	89%				Advanced
3	Adriza Chakraborty	Surmai Akhiyon Mein	81%				Advanced
4	Salamat Ali	Main Jahan Rahoon	77%				Advanced
5	Animesh Sharma	Naina	70%				Eliminated

Color key

Advanced

Eliminated

== Dosti Special & Madhuri Dixit Special ==
=== Episode 18: 18 May 2019 ===
Second Chance:

Order	Contestant	Song	Votes	Expert's			Result
Order	Contestant	Song	Votes	Shankar Mahadevan	Neeti Mohan	Diljit Dosanjh	Result
1	Rehmat Ali	Sanu Ek Pal	86%				Won Re-entry
2	Konkan Kanya	Humma Humma + Ke Sera Sera	44%				Couldn't make a comeback

Color key

Advanced
Eliminated

Dosti Special:

Order	Contestant	Song	Votes	Expert's			Result
Order	Contestant	Song	Votes	Shankar Mahadevan	Neeti Mohan	Diljit Dosanjh	Result
1	Sanjay Satish	Dil Se Re	91%				Advanced
2	Amritha Rajan	Barso Re Megha	83%				Advanced
3	Salamat Ali	Aas Pas Hai Khuda	80%				Eliminated
4	Aftab Singh	Piya Re Piya Re	93%				Advanced

Color key

Advanced
Eliminated

=== Episode 19: 19 May 2019 ===
Madhuri Dixit Special:

Order	Contestant	Song	Votes	Expert's			Guests	Result
Order	Contestant	Song	Votes	Shankar Mahadevan	Neeti Mohan	Diljit Dosanjh	Guests	Result
1	Abhishek Saraph	Khambe Jaisi + Eena Meena Deeka	88%					Advanced
2	Adriza Chakraborty	Mera Piya Ghar Aaya + Aaja Nachle	79%					Advanced
3	Diwakar Sharma	Pehla Pehla Pyaar Hai	94%					Advanced
4	Rehmat Ali	O Re Piya	78%					Advanced
5	Ananya Nanda	Maar Dala	82%					Advanced
6	Chow Oupseng Namchum	Chak Dhoom Dhoom	71%					Eliminated

Color key

Advanced
Eliminated

== Qawwali Special & Bharat Special ==
=== Episode 20: 25 May 2019 ===
Challenger Week

In this week contestant challenged each other to beat their score. The contestant who sat on the Red Chair till the end of the episode was Eliminated.

Order	Contestant	Song	Votes	Expert's			Notes	Result
Order	Contestant	Song	Votes	Shankar Mahadevan	Neeti Mohan	Diljit Dosanjh	Notes	Result
1	Abhishek Saraph	Aye Meri Zohra Jabeen	91%				Abhishek was selected to sing first by a lucky dip.	Advanced
2	Rehmat Ali	Allah Hoo	87%				Challenged By Abhishek. Could beat the Score.	Advanced
3	Adriza Chakraborty	Kajra Re	52%				Challenged by Rehmat. Could not beat the score.	Eliminated
4	Amritha Rajan	Kajra Mohabbat Wala	86%				Challenged by Adriza. Could beat the score.	Advanced
5	Ananya Nanda	Nigahein Milane Ko	91%				Challenged by Adriza. Could beat the score.	Advanced
6	Aftab Singh	Piya Haji Ali	94%				Challenged by Adriza. Could beat the score.	Advanced
7	Sanjay Satish	Tumse Milke Dil Ka Jo Haal	93%				Challenged by Adriza. Could beat the score.	Advanced
8	Diwakar Sharma	Aaya Tere Dar Par Deewana	96%				Challenged by Adriza. Could beat the score.	Advanced

Color key

Advanced
Eliminated

=== Episode 21: 26 May 2019 ===
Order	Contestant	Song	Votes	Expert's			Result
Order	Contestant	Song	Votes	Shankar Mahadevan	Neeti Mohan	Diljit Dosanjh	Result
1	Abhishek Saraph	Ishq Di Chashni	87%				Advanced
2	Sanjay Satish	Tadap Tadap Ke	91%				Advanced
3	Diwakar Sharma	Chand Chhupa Badal Mein	93%				Advanced
4	Amritha Rajan	Hum Dil De Chuke Sanam	82%				Advanced
5	Aftab Singh	Bhar Do Jholi Meri	94%				Advanced
6	Ananya Nanda	Kamli	87%				Advanced
7	Rehmat Ali	Humka Peeni Hai	61%				Eliminated

Color key

Advanced
Eliminated

== Ticket To Finale & Semi Finale Week ==
The contestants compete to earn a direct entry to the finale week for Ticket To Finale.

=== Episode 22: 1 June 2019 ===
Order	Contestant	Song	Votes	Experts' Choices			Result
Order	Contestant	Song	Votes	Shankar Mahadevan	Neeti Mohan	Diljit Dosanjh	Result
1	Sanjay Satish	Satrangi Re	89.8%				Advanced
2	Diwakar Sharma	Tanhai	89.1%				Advanced
3	Ananya Nanda	Duaa	74%				Advanced
4	Abhishek Saraph	Yeh Dil Deewana + Deewana Tera	84%				Advanced
5	Amritha Rajan	Kabhi Alvida Na Kehna	73%				Eliminated
6	Aftab Singh	Haanikaarak Bapu	93%				Won Ticket To Finale

Color key

Advanced
Eliminated

=== Episode 23: 2 June 2019 ===
Order	Contestant	Song	Votes	Experts' Choices			Result
Order	Contestant	Song	Votes	Shankar Mahadevan	Neeti Mohan	Diljit Dosanjh	Result
1	Abhishek Saraph	Pehla Nasha	86%				Advanced
2	Sanjay Satish	Roop Tera Mastana	89%				Advanced
3	Ananya Nanda	Chura Liya Hai Tumne Jo Dil Ko	84%				Eliminated
4	Diwakar Sharma	Tum Hi Ho	93%				Advanced

Color key

Advanced
Eliminated

== Grand Finale ==
=== Episode 24: 8 June 2019 ===
First Round: Judges had 3% votes.

Order	Contestant	Song	Votes	Experts' Choices			Guests	Result
Order	Contestant	Song	Votes	Shankar Mahadevan	Neeti Mohan	Diljit Dosanjh	Guests	Result
1	Diwakar Sharma	Bulleya	91%					Advanced
2	Sanjay Satish	Maa Thuje Salam	90%					Advanced
3	Abhishek Saraph	Alvida	79%					Eliminated
4	Aftab Singh	Aahun Aahun	90%					Advanced

Color key

Advanced
Eliminated

Second Round: Judges had no voting power.

Order	Contestant	Song	Votes	Result
1	Sanjay Satish	Jhoom Barabar Jhoom	76%	2nd Runner-up
2	Diwakar Sharma	Ramta Jogi	82%	1st Runner-up
3	Aftab Singh	Tharki Chokro	89%	Winner

Color key

Winner
1st Runner-up
2nd Runner-up

== India's Favourite 17 ==
No.	Contestant	City,State	Notes	Status	Result
1	Aftab Singh	Faridkot, Punjab	Participated in Sa Re Ga Ma Pa Li'l Champs 2017	Winner	1st Position
2	Diwakar Sharma	Delhi, Delhi	1st Runner up of Sa Re Ga Ma Pa L'il Champs 1	1st Runner-up	2nd Position
3	Sanjay Satish	Calicut, Kerala	2nd Runner up of Sa Re Ga Ma Pa Seniors (Tamil)	2nd Runner-up	3rd Position
4	Abhishek Saraph	Solapur, Maharashtra		3rd Runner-up	4th Position
5	Ananya Nanda	Bhubaneswar, Odisha	Winner of Indian Idol Junior 2	Eliminated on 2 June	5th Position
6	Amritha Rajan	Calicut, Kerala		Eliminated on 1 June	6th Position
7	Rehmat Ali	Phillaur, Punjab	Eliminated on 11 May; Re-entry on 18 May	Eliminated on 26 May	7th Position
8	Adriza Chakraborty	Kolkata, West Bengal		Eliminated on 25 May	8th Position
9	Chow Oupseng Namchum	Chowkham, Arunachal Pradesh		Eliminated on 19 May	9th Position
10	Salamat Ali	Matoi, Punjab		Eliminated on 18 May	10th Position
11	Animesh Sharma	Rangiya, Assam	Participated in Dil Hai Hindustani (season 2)	Eliminated on 12 May	11th Position
12	Vishwaja Jadhav	Virar, Maharashtra		Eliminated on 5 May	12th Position
13	Konkan Kanya	Konkan, Maharashtra	Eliminated on 4 May; Re-entry on 18 May	Eliminated on 18 May	13th Position
14	Suparna Panda	Midnapore, West Bengal		Eliminated on 28 April	14th Position
15	Chetan Brijwasi	Mathura, Uttar Pradesh	Participated in Rising Star (Indian season 2)	Eliminated on 27 April	15th Position
16	Swastika Thakur	Nagpur, Maharashtra		Eliminated on 21 April	16th Position
17	Saimann Sewa	Darjeeling, West Bengal	Participated in Sa Re Ga Ma Pa Li'l Champs 2017	Eliminated on 21 April	17th Position

Winner
1st Runner-up
2nd Runner-up
3rd Runner-up
Semi finalists
Eliminated
Eliminated and Re-entry

== Scoring Chart ==
Contestant	Auditions	Duels	Week 1 Salam-E-Rekha	Week 2 Summer Camp &Bachpan ke Din	Week 3 Fully Filmy	Week 4 Lakshmikant-Pyarelal Special &Parents Special	Week 5 Second Chance & Dosti Special & Madhuri Dixit Special		Week 6 Qawwali Special & Bharat Special		Week 7 TICKET TO FINALE & SEMI FINALE		GRAND FINALE		Position	Average%
Aftab Singh	95%	94%	92.9%	94%	93%	92%	93%		94%	94%	93%	Ticket To Finale	90%	89%	1st	92.8%
Diwakar Sharma	95%	93%	94%	94%	90%	95%	94%		96%	93%	89.1%	93%	91%	82%	2nd	92.2%
Sanjay Satish	93%	88%	94%	91%	90%	93%	91%		93%	91%	89.8%	89%	90%	76%	3rd	89.9%
Abhishek Saraph	95%	94%	92.3%	91%	89%	92%	88%		91%	87%	84%	86%	79%	Finalist	4th	89.0%
Ananya Nanda	93%	91%	92.3%	89%	90%	86%	82%		91%	87%	74%	84%	Eliminated		5th	87.2%
Amritha Rajan	91%	90%	86%	86%	89%	90%	83%		86%	82%	73%	Eliminated			6th	85.6%
Rehmat Ali	89%	92%	92.9%	88%	86%	72%	86%	78%	87%	61%	Eliminated				7th	83.2%
Adriza Chakraborty	89%	85%	86%	82%	88%	81%	79%		52%	Eliminated					8th	80.3%
Chow Oupseng Namchum	96%	93%	87%	88%	88%	89%	71%		Eliminated						9th	87.4%
Salamat Ali	91%	85%	88%	87%	87%	77%	80%		Eliminated						10th	85.0%
Animesh Sharma	97%	95%	93%	94%	93%	70%	Eliminated								11th	90.3%
Vishwaja Jadhav	89%	94%	87%	84%	84%	Eliminated									12th	87.6%
Konkan Kanya	91%	85%	88%	81%	77%	Eliminated	44%	Eliminated							13th	77.7%
Suparna Panda	88%	90%	93%	77%	Eliminated										14th	87.0%
Chetan Brijwasi	86%	79%	87%	77%	Eliminated										15th	82.3%
Swastika Thakur	94%	90%	79%	Eliminated											16th	87.7%
Saimann Sewa	91%	89%	79%	Eliminated											17th	86.3%

The contestant was the highest scorer.
The contestant was the second highest scorer.
The contestant was the second lowest scorer.
The contestant was the lowest scorer and was eliminated.
The contestant was actually eliminated but was saved on Expert's Request.
The contestant had a chance to return, won and re-entered the competition.
The contestant had a chance to return to the competition but lost was eliminated again.
Ticket To Finale
Winner
1st Runner-up
2nd Runner-up
3rd Runner-up

== Guests ==
Guest Judge
Expert Judge
Guest Companion

Guest	Episode	Date	Notes
Fear Factor: Khatron Ke Khiladi 9 Contestants and Host	0	10 March	Grand Finale and Motivate Aditya Narayan
Amit Mishra (singer), Neha Bhasin, Jonita Gandhi, Akriti Kakkar, Nakash Aziz, Master Saleem	1	16 March	To introduce new contestants
Sukhwinder Singh	2	17 March	Guest Judge
Rohanpreet Singh & Akhtar Bros	2	17 March	Ex Contestants & for a performance
Shah Rukh Khan	3	23 March	LIVE from Filmfare Awards.
Vishnumaya Ramesh, Maithili Thakur, Hemant Brijwasi, Bannet Dosanjh, Rohanpreet Singh, Akhtar Bros, Chetan Brijwasi, Vikramjeet Singh	3 & 4	23 March & 24 March	Ex Contestants of Season 1 & 2 [Finalists]
Mumbai Indians team: Yuvraj Singh, Jasprit Bumrah, Krunal Pandya	6	31 March	IPL team of Mumbai Indians
Mika Singh	7	6 April	Guest Judge
Darshan Raval	7	6 April	To promote "Dil Beats"
Varun Dhawan, Alia Bhatt, Aditya Roy Kapur, Sonakshi Sinha	8	7 April	Promotion of "Kalank"
Kumar Sanu	10	14 April	Guest Judge
Dhvani Bhanushali	10	14 April	To sing "Dilbar", "Leja Re", "Vaaste" with Saimann Sewa and Aditya Narayan in The Grand Premiere
Rekha	11	21 April	Expert Judge
Tiger Shroff, Tara Sutaria, Ananya Pandey	12	27 April	Promotion of "Student of the Year 2"
Ajay Devgan, Tabu, Rakul Preet Singh	15	5 May	Promotion of "De De Pyaar De"
Pyarelal and Band	16	11 May	Guest Judge & Companion
Deepika Singh as Sandhya Patwardhan; Namik Paul as Angad Jindal; Vin Rana as Kapil Mittal	18	18 May	To promote "Kavach 2"
Madhuri Dixit	19	19 May	To promote "Dance Deewane 2"
Salman Khan and Katrina Kaif	21	26 May	To promote "Bharat"
Pearl V Puri as Ragbir Malhotra	21	26 May	To promote "Bepanah Pyaar"
Tushar Kalia, Shashank Khaitan, Arjun Bijlani	23	2 June	To promote "Dance Deewane 2"
Udit Narayan	24	8 June	Guest Judge
Nimrit Kaur Ahluwalia	24	8 June	To promote "Choti Sardaarni"
