= Chhanv Foundation =

Indian non-governmental organization

- Logo
- Founder: Alok Dixit, Ashish Shukla
- Type: NGO
- Award: Nari Shakti Puraskar
- Website: www.chhanv.org

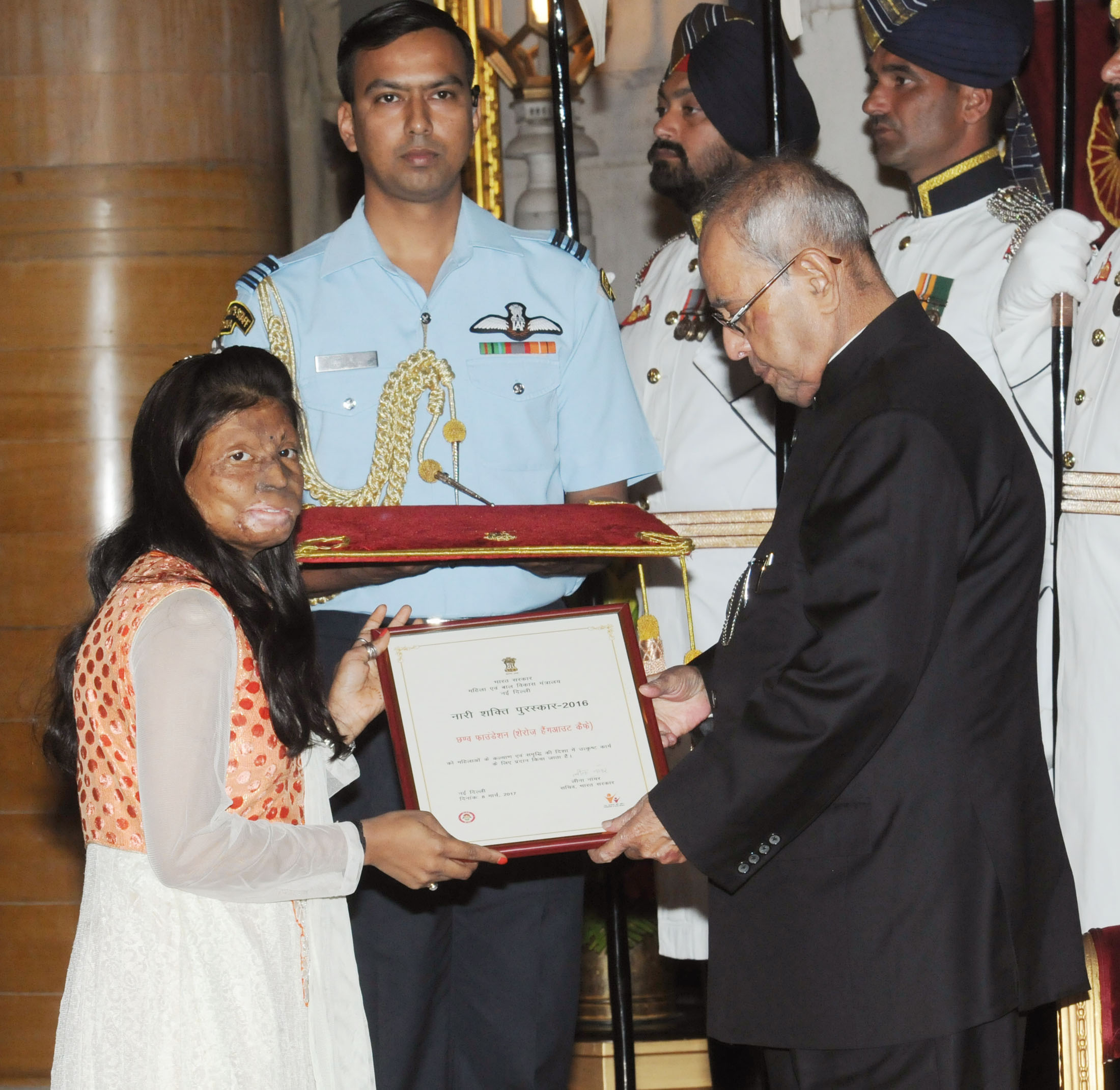
An acid attack survivor receives the Nari Shakti Pauraskar on behalf of the Chhanv Foundation in 2017

The Chhanv Foundation is a non-governmental organization (NGO) set up by Alok Dixit and Ashish Shukla in 2013 in order to help the survivors of acid attacks. It runs cafés known under the social enterprise Sheroes Hangout in Agra, Lucknow and Noida which works for the rehabilitation and employment of acid attack survivors. The NGO received the Nari Shakti Puraskar and in 2020 stated it had helped over 100 survivors of acid attacks.

== Foundation ==
The Chhanv Foundation was set up by Alok Dixit and Ashish Shukla in 2013 in order to help the survivors of acid attacks, who are mostly women. They envisage to bring relief in the lives of the survivors of acid attacks and help in as many directions for them to have access to medical recovery and fast justice to fight back the irreparable impact of this crime.The National Crime Records Bureau stated in 2021 that between 2014 and 2018 there had been almost 1,600 attacks.

== Cafés ==
Chhanv opened the first café in Agra in 2014 where survivors could find employment, since they are shunned from many sectors of society. It was known as Sheroes Hangout and other branches were opened in Lucknow and Noida. The parent model of Sheroes Hangout is the country's first café managed and run by acid attack survivors

During the COVID-19 pandemic in India, the cafés in Agra and Lucknow were forced to close down. This impacted the foundation's work since the profits were used to fund the treatment and rehabilitation of attack survivors. Dixit then introduced Gift a Story, an internet retail platform which sells products such as candles and handicrafts made by survivors. In addition, café staff in Agra switched to supplying food to the city's poorest inhabitants, funded by donations. Sheroes Agra reopened in December 2021. Seven months later, two Sheroes kiosks were opened in Noida.

== Awards and recognition ==
Michelle Obama presented the organisation with the International Women of Courage Award in 2014. Emma Macey Storch made the film Geeta about Geeta Mahor who was acid attacked by her husband, who also poured acid on his three daughters whilst they slept in 1992. Mahor later helped to found the Sheroes café in Agra. Chhapaak is a 2020 film about the life of acid attack survivors starring Deepika Padukone. Padukone donated Rs 15 lakh to help an attack survivor who had appeared in the film with life-saving kidney treatment.

In recognition of its work, Chhanv received the Nari Shakti Puraskar in 2017. As of 2022, it had helped over 100 survivors of acid attacks. The foundation announced in 2022 that it was fundraising Rs 1 crore for medical treatment.

== See also ==
- Mitti Cafe
