= Youmanity =

Social equality and human rights charity

- Founded: 1 June 2008
- Founder: Angelo Iudice
- Type: Charitable organisation
- Registration no.: England and Wales: 1178295
- Purpose: Human Rights; Social Equality
- Website: https://www.youmanity.today/

Youmanity is a UK-based organisation founded in 2008, registered as a charity in May 2018, and based in London. (Note: Until 2015, it was known as 'Accademia Apulia', "a non-profit network of professionals in the United Kingdom".)

== Charity work ==
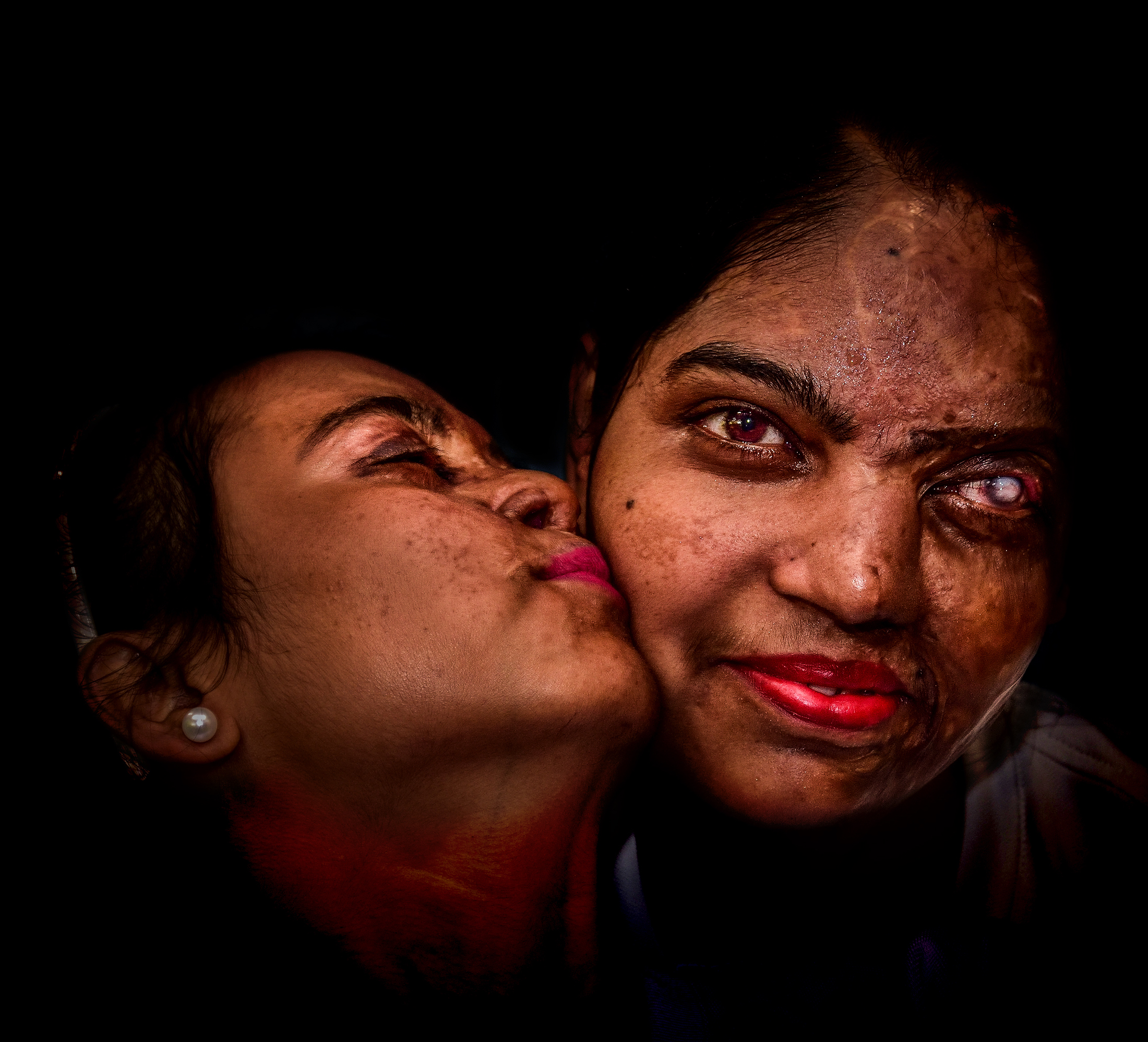
Acid attack victims supporting one another at Sheroes Hangout Cafe, by Debdatta Chakraborty.

Youmanity sponsors an annual photography award, mental health and education projects.

=== Youmanity Award for photography ===
Since 2010, the organisation has held an annual photography competition, focused on cultural diversity, with a £1,000 prize. Each competition has a theme. In 2012, for example, the theme was "Migration, Stories of a Journey". In 2019 the theme was "Friend-Ship"; Debdatta Chakraborty was the winner for his shot of the Sheroes Hangout café in India. In 2020, during the COVID-19 pandemic, the theme was "Friend-Ship During Challenging Times". The winner was ‘A kiss from across the miles’ by Nicola Parker, a mobile screenshot taken during lockdown portraying an 80-year-old grandmother blowing a kiss from a nursing home.

=== Youmanity education project ===
In 2019, Youmanity led a two-year student-centred learning project to support vulnerable children at risk of abandoning education. The 2SMILE project was funded by the European Commission's Erasmus Programme.

=== 'Chill-out' train carriages ===
In October 2021, during the COVID-19 pandemic and ahead of World Mental Health Day, it devised a 'mindfulness' campaign featuring the world's first 'chill-out' train carriages, plus 'meditation corners' in stations, to reduce commuter anxiety. Project collaborators included wellbeing movement Thrive LDN and the Braincharge meditation app, with users able to listen to rustling trees and birdsong, plus soothing music, while waiting for trains. As well as gaining attention in London media, the initiative was reported in US publication The New Yorker.
