= Kashmakash =

Kashmakash (lit. 'Struggle') may refer to:

- Kashmakash (album), a 1995 compilation album by Junoon
- Kashmakash (1973 film), an Indian Hindi-language film
- Kashmakash, the Hindi-language dubbed version of Noukadubi

== See also ==
- Kash-m-kash, an Indian drama television series
