= Mitti =

Mitti may refer to:

- Mitti (2010 film), an Indian Punjabi-language film
- Mitti (2001 film), an Indian Hindi-language crime-thriller film
- Mitti Cafe, a chain of cafes in India
- Mitti (company), an Australian technology company

== See also ==
- Matti (disambiguation)
- Mitti attar, a perfume from India
- Maati (film), 2018 Indian film
