= Suchitra Krishnamoorthi =

Indian actress and singer

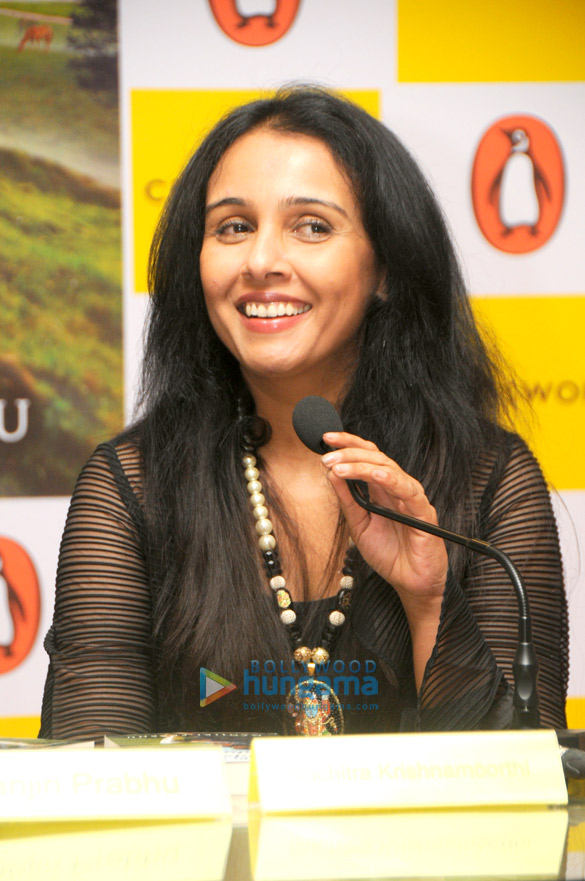
- Suchitra in 2014
- Born: 27 November 1975 (age 50); Bombay, Maharashtra, India
- Education: Sydenham College of Commerce and Economics
- Occupations: Actress; singer
- Works: Discography; filmography
- Spouse: Shekhar Kapur (m. 1999; div. 2007)
- Children: 1
- Family: Anand–Sahni family (through marriage)
- Awards: See below
- Musical career
- Genres: Pop; Rock
- Instrument: Vocals
- Labels: Magnasound; Sony Music; Universal Music Group

Suchitra Krishnamoorthi (born 27 November 1975) is an Indian actress, model and singer known for her works in Hindi cinema, South cinema, and television.

== Early and personal life ==
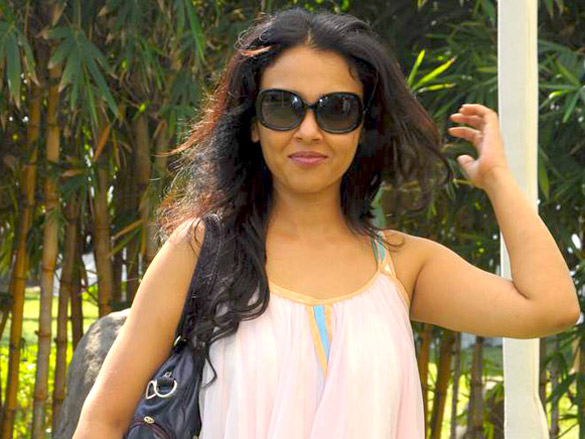
Suchitra Krishnamurthy

Suchitra was born in Mumbai, Maharashtra to a Telugu family, Her father, V. Krishnamoorthi was a former commissioner of income tax and her mother, Dr Sulochana Krishnamoorthi was a historian and a professor. Suchitra was married to the filmmaker Shekhar Kapur, but they divorced. They have a daughter named Kaveri Kapur. Her sister, Sujata Kumar, passed away in 2018 due to cancer.

== Career ==
Suchitra started her career with the TV series Chunauti while still in school in the year 1987–1988. She acted in a production of Peanuts: The Musical, a musical based on the famous comic strip Peanuts. She played the character Lucy. She appeared in television commercials endorsing products such as Palmolive soap, Clearasil, Sunrise Coffee, Limca and Colgate toothpaste. In 1994, she made her breakthrough in films with Kabhi Haan Kabhi Naa, a commercial and critically acclaimed hit, opposite Shahrukh Khan. She also starred in Kilukkampetti opposite Malayalam superstar Jayaram.

She pursued a music career in the mid- to late 1990s, releasing the pop albums Dole Dole (1995), Dum Tara (1996), A-Ha (1997) and Zindagi. She returned after 10 years in the film My Wife's Murder (2005), opposite Anil Kapoor. The year 2010 saw the release of Rann, a film about the Indian media, directed by Ram Gopal Varma. Suchitra played the role of a media executive named Nalini Kashyap. In 2022, Suchitra played the role of Nivedita in the critically acclaimed movie on Netflix, Odd Couple, opposite Divyendu Sharma.

Suchitra is a writer whose views were first noticed via her blogs. Her many blogs – first on www.intentblog.com, a site where she was invited to share her views by Deepak Chopra, "art in a body part" and "give me another break", and subsequently on her own site – have put Suchitra in many controversies. Suchitra's novel The Summer of Cool was released by Penguin India in January 2009 and met with huge success. It is her first in four called the Swapnalok Society series. The second book in the series is titled The Good News Reporter, and The Ghost on the Ledge, the third part of the series, was released in 2016.

Drama Queen, a memoir by Suchitra released in November 2013, received positive reviews. The first print of the book sold out within a week of its release.

Drama Queen, a musical written by Suchitra and adapted from her book, opened at NCPA Mumbai in October 2016. Drama Queen is still being staged across India.

Odd Couple, a feature film starring Suchitra, Vijay Raaz and Divyendu Sharma, was released on Amazon India in 2022. It trended on the Top 10 on Amazon India for several months.

== Filmography ==
=== Films ===
Year	Title	Role	Language	Notes
1991	Kilukkampetti	Anu Pillai	Malayalam	
1991	Sivaranjani	Sivaranjani	Tamil	
1993	Kabhi Haan Kabhi Naa	Anna	Hindi	
1994	Jazbaat	Varsha	Hindi	
1994	Vaade Iraade	Jyoti	Hindi	
1999	Vishwa	Usha	Kannada	
2005	My Wife's Murder	Sheela	Hindi	
2007	Aag	Kavita	Hindi	
2009	Karma Aur Holi	Sujata	Hindi	
2010	Rann	Nalini Kashyap	Hindi	
2010	Mittal v/s Mittal	Karuna Maheshwari	Hindi	
2019	Romeo Akbar Walter	Rehana Kazmi	Hindi	
2022	Odd Couple	Nivedita Verma	Hindi	

=== Television ===
Year	Title	Role	Notes
1987–1988	Chunauti		Debut as child artist.
1988	Mujrim Haazir		
1995	Kash-m-kash	Ashi	
1995	Chinna Chinna Aasai- Suyamvaram	Surekha	Tamil language show
1996	Channel [V] Music Awards	Herself (Presenter)	Music Award show
2020	Never Kiss Your Best Friend	Sumer's mother	
2022	Guilty Minds	Neela	

== Discography ==
=== Studio albums ===
Year	Title	Record label
1995	Dole Dole	Magnasound
1996	Oohalu	Magnasound
1996	Dum Tara	Magnasound
1997	A-Ha	Magnasound
2007	Zindagi	UMG

=== Singles ===
Title	Year	Peak chart positions	Music	Songwriter
Title	Year	UK Asian	Music	Songwriter
Sawan Barse	2018	—	Surya Vishwakarma	Surya Vishwakarma
Namo Namo (Cover)	2019	—		
Shararat	2023	—	Sunita Nagaranjan	Mayur Puri

=== Compilation albums ===
Year	Title	Record label
1996	Channel Hits	Magnasound
1997	Party Zone	Magnasound
1998	The Ultimate Party Album	Magnasound

== Awards and nominations ==
Year	Category	Song/Album/Film	Result	Ref(s)
Channel V Music Awards
1996	Best Female Pop Vocalists	Dum Tara	Nominated	
1998	Best Female Pop Vocalists	A-Ha	Nominated	
Filmfare Awards
1994	Best Debut film	Kabhi Haan Kabhi Naa	Nominated	
Screen Awards
1996	Best Debut Indian Pop Album	Dole Dole	Won	
1997	Best Pop Singer	Dum Tara	Nominated	
