= Bicchoo Ka Khel =

Crime web series

- Genre: Drama; Web series
- Developed by: Balaji Telefilms
- Written by: Gibran Noorani
- Directed by: Ashish Shukla
- Starring: Divyendu Sharma; Anshul Chauhan; Mukul Chadda; Trisshna Mukherji; Zeishan Quadri; Rajesh Sharma; Satyajit Sharma; Gagan Anand
- Country of origin: India
- Original language: Hindi
- No. of seasons: 1
- No. of episodes: 9

Production
- Producers: Ekta Kapoor; Shobha Kapoor
- Production locations: Mumbai, Maharashtra India
- Editors: Vikas Sharma; Vishal Sharma; Sandip Bhatt
- Camera setup: Multi-camera
- Running time: 19-25 minutes
- Production company: Balaji Telefilms

Original release
- Network: ALT Balaji; ZEE5
- Release: 18 November 2020

Bicchoo Ka Khel is a Hindi-language crime thriller web series. Starring Divyendu Sharma in the lead, the series features Trishna Mukharjee, Anshul Chauhan, Mukul Chadda, Satyajit Sharma and Rajesh Sharma in key roles. It is a revenge drama that tells the tale of a young lad Akhil (Divyendu Sharma) from UP who challenges and mocks the legal system.

The series was released on 18 November 2020, and is available for streaming on both ZEE5 and ALT Balaji.

== Plot ==
The series revolves around mastermind killer Akhil who makes a confession before the police about why he committed a murder. He narrates the story about his life and challenges police officers that he would not get any punishment despite his confession.

== Cast ==
- Divyendu Sharma as Akhil Srivastava
- Anshul Chauhan as Rashmi Chaubey
- Mukul Chadda as Babu Shrivastav
- Trisshna Mukherji as Protima Chaubey
- Zeishan Quadri as Nikunj Tiwari
- Rajesh Sharma as Mukesh Chaubey
- Satyajit Sharma as Anil Chaubey
- Gagan Anand as Rajveer
- Akansha Thakur as Renu Singh
- Prashansa Sharma as Poonam Tiwari
- Abhinav Anand as Vikas
- Akash Sahay as Mahindra Singh
- Abhishekh Chauhan as Goldy Singh
- Gautam Babbar as Munna Singh
- Durgesh Kumar as Goli
- Shreedhar Dubey as Prem Kumar Pandey
- Firdous Khan as Mrs. Gupta

== Release ==
The series was released on 18 November 2020, and is available for streaming on both ZEE5 and ALT Balaji.

== Reception ==
Shubra Gupta from The Indian Express gave a mixed review stating "Divyenndu has a smart mouth on him, and makes the most of Bicchoo Ka Khel, but even he needs a new schtick." Archika Khurana from Times Of India gave 3 out of 5 stars and stated "Fans of Divyenndu Sharma aka Munna Bhaiya from Mirzapur will not be disheartened with his act as Akhil Shrivastav. He is back with a bang – mouthing dialogues laden with cuss words, his expressions and comic timing is just brilliant. Anshul Chauhan as his girlfriend Rashmi Chaubey has nailed it. Her chemistry with Divyenndu is endearing and turns out to be one of the highlights of the show." Gautam Batra from Koimoi wrote "Anshul Chauhan is too good. She lends a very good performance and looks so cute. Her chemistry with Divyenndu is endearing and one of the highlights of the show." Prathyush Parasuraman from Filmcompanion stated the moview as "It's a feel-good low-budget masala genre."
