= Odd Couple (2022 film) =

- Poster of movie Odd Couple
- Directed by: Prashant Johari
- Written by: Praneet Verma; Prashant Johari
- Screenplay by: Prashant Johari
- Produced by: Praneet Verma
- Starring: Divyenndu; Suchitra Krishnamoorthi; Vijay Raaz; Pranati Rai Prakash
- Cinematography: Srijit Basu
- Edited by: Prakash Jha
- Music by: Jay Rajesh Arya
- Production company: Nipram Creations
- Release date: 2 August 2022
- Country: India
- Language: Hindi

Odd Couple is a 2022 Indian Hindi language film featuring Divyenndu, Vijay Raaz, Suchitra Krishnamoorthi, and Pranati Rai Prakash. It released directly on Amazon Prime Video, on 2 August 2022 to positive reviews. Odd Couple was featured at the Indian Film Festival of Ireland, Imagine India Madrid, South Asian International Film Festival New York, Jaipur International Film Festival and many others.

== Plot ==
Odd Couple is a story based on the modern relationships, values, and priorities in the midst of an exchange of marriage, caused by the registration authorities. The story speaks about their oddness and evenness towards age differences, love, cosmos, and uncertainty in life with the Freudian slip.

== Cast ==
- Divyenndu as Piyush Kumar
- Suchitra Krishnamoorthi as Nivedita Verma
- Vijay Raaz as Yogesh Pant
- Pranati Rai Prakash as Nivedita 'Navi' Rao
- Manoj Pahwa as Magistrate / Judge Choutala
- Kumar Rajput as Ganapathi Dhanush Katepalli Rao
- Saharsh Kumar Shukla as Driver Sudhir
- Sumit Gulati as Sunny
- Pradeep Singh Adhikari as Post Man
- Neha Negi
- Chunmun Yadav
