= Salt City (TV series) =

Indian Hindi-language family-drama web television series

- Genre: Family-drama
- Written by: Pranjal Saxena; Rishabh Anupam Sahay; Shashank Kunwar
- Directed by: Rishabh Anupam Sahay
- Starring: Piyush Mishra; Divyenndu; Gauahar Khan
- Country of origin: India
- Original language: Hindi
- No. of seasons: 1
- No. of episodes: 7

Production
- Producers: Sameer Nair; Deepak Segal; Seema & Sudhir
- Production companies: Applause Entertainment & Sunshine Productions

Original release
- Network: SonyLIV
- Release: 16 June 2022

Salt City is an Indian Hindi-language family-drama web television series which was premiered on SonyLIV, on 16 June 2022. It is produced by Applause Entertainment & Sunshine Productions and directed by Rishabh Anupam Sahay.

== Cast ==
- Piyush Mishra as Harish Bajpai
- Divyenndu as Saurabh Bajpai
- Gauahar Khan as Gunjan Bajpai
- Navni Parihar as Triveni Bajpai
- Manish Anand as Aman Bajpai
- Pranay Pachauri as Nikhil Bajpai
- Jitin Gulati as Sukesh Sood
- Vinita Joshi as Sulekha Gaitonde
- Nivedita Bhattacharya as Vibha
- Monica Chaudhary as Ela Bajpai

== Synopsis ==
Salt City traces the journey of the Bajpai family, through the pressures that life in a big city puts on their relationships. The story revolves around 5 siblings & how their lives cross each others, exposing their past and unfolding their future. Their journeys make them realise their bitter realities, motivating them to confront it without fear and get closer to themselves.

== Release ==
Web television series which was premiered on SonyLIV, on 16 June 2022.
