= Kilukkampetti =

- Directed by: Shaji Kailas
- Screenplay by: Rajan Kiriyath; Vinu Kiriyath
- Story by: Shaji Kailas
- Produced by: Baiju
- Starring: Jayaram; Suchitra Krishnamoorthi; Baby Shamili; Jagathy Sreekumar; Sai Kumar
- Cinematography: Ravi K. Chandran
- Edited by: L. Bhoominathan
- Music by: S. Balakrishnan
- Production company: Ambalakkara Films
- Distributed by: Keerthi Release through Jubilee
- Release date: 19 December 1991
- Country: India
- Language: Malayalam

Kilukkampetti (കിലുക്കാംപെട്ടി, transl. Jingle Box) is a 1991 Indian Malayalam language romantic comedy drama film directed by Shaji Kailas and written by Rajan Kiriyath and Vinu Kiriyath from a story by Kailas. It stars Jayaram and Suchitra Krishnamoorthi, and also features Shamili, Jagathy Sreekumar, Sai Kumar, and Innocent in significant roles. The film was a box office success.

The film is loosely based on the 1990 made-for-TV film The Maid. The film was remade in Telugu as Joker (1993) and in Hindi as Pyaar Impossible! (2010).

== Plot ==
Prakash Menon (Jayaram) is a successful architect based in Thiruvananthapuram, Kerala. His company's Kochi branch was not doing well and the company relocated him to Kochi to improve things. He was supposed to replace his equivalent in Kochi named Anu Pillai (Suchitra Krishnamoorthi). Anu wasn't happy about the company's decision: She didn't want to move out of Kochi and objected. Prakash understands the office situation, and decides to talk to Anu in person.

Anu is living with her eight-year-old daughter Chikkumol (Baby Shamili). She is very naughty and Anu is not able to get a caretaker as no one is able to handle her. Prakash falls in love with Anu after seeing her in a shopping mall. He learns from his friend Mukundan that Anu is in search of a caretaker. Prakash reaches Anu's home and takes up the job under the name of Vasudevan with the intention of getting Anu to love him.

What follows is funny situations where Prakash has to take care of the girl, cook for the family and kids, and hide himself from those at his office. Eventually Anu goes to Prakash's house to request him not to take charge in Kochi and, on seeing him, understands that he had tricked her. But Prakash resigns from his job and appears to have gone back to Thiruvananthapuram. Anu starts to understand his love and feels sad. But on reaching her home, she finds that Prakash is back again as Vasudevan. Thus the movie ends on a happy note.

== Cast ==
- Jayaram as Prakash Menon / Vasudevan
- Suchitra Krishnamoorthi as Anu Pillai
- Jagathy Sreekumar as Mukundan
- Baby Shamili as Chikkumol
- Sai Kumar as Raju
- Innocent as Scariah
- K. P. A. C. Lalitha as Saramma, Scariah's Wife
- Janardanan as Managing Director K.K. Nambiar
- Bahadoor as Muthachan
- Shyama as Anu's Friend
- Bobby Kottarakkara as Laser
- Thrissur Elsy as Padmini
- Subhash Gopinath as Prakash's friend
- Suvarna Mathew as Mariam Mathew, Office staff
- Beena Antony as Cameo in song

== Soundtrack ==
No.	Title	Singer(s)	Length
1.	"Pachakkarikkaya"	M. G. Sreekumar	4:29
2.	"Kikkili Kudukka"	M. G. Sreekumar	4:56
3.	"Janma Ragam"	M. G. Sreekumar, K. S. Chithra	4:43
