= Swaraag =

Indian Indo-western fusion band

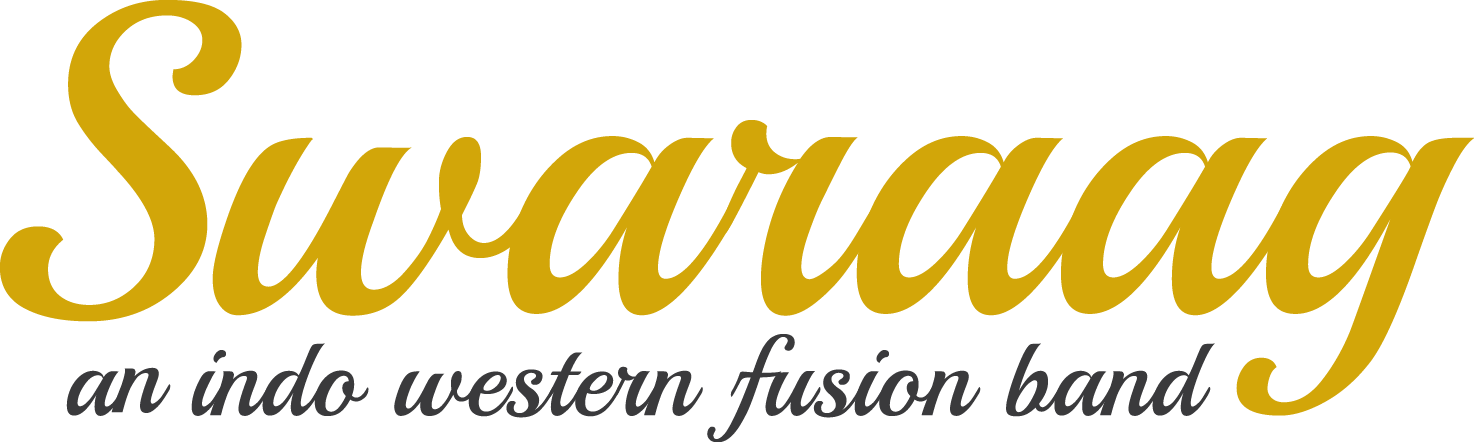
- Swaraag Band Logo

Background information
- Origin: Rajasthan, India
- Genres: Folk, fusion, Sufi, instrumental
- Instruments: Acoustic guitar, drum, zitar, tabla, saxophone, morchang-khartal, harmonium
- Years active: 2014–present
- Website: swaraagmusic.com

Swaraag is an Indo-Western fusion band based in Rajasthan, India known for its traditional Rajasthani as well as western music. It comes from Swa-self, raag-raga. The band was founded by Arif Khan and Pratap Singh in 2014. The traditional music instruments such as Khartal-Morchang and Zitar make the band unique. They gained fame through their various live performances.

The band was a contestant on season 3 of Rising Star. They received a 92% rating by the public for their first song, "Ghoomar".

The band was appreciated by Indian film actor Ram Charan for their soulful music.

Swaraag has completed more than 1000 performances worldwide.

== History ==
Swaraag was founded in April 2014 when Arif Khan, a freelance zitar and sitar player, met Pratap Singh at a concert. Pratap had a vision of bringing folk music to the mainstream commercial industry. By the end of 2014, they were ready with their new genre. Singh suggested the name "Swaraag", an Indo-western fusion band. Requests for weddingand corporate events started pouring in, and Swaraag was introduced on stage for the first time as an instrumental band.

The band now has four artists, along with instruments such as zitar, tabla, guitar, and saxophone. Later they added vocals to the band, with lead singer Asif Khan. They also added drum and khartal.

Swaraag kept evolving, and made music in genres including Rajasthani folk fusion, Sufi fusion, instrumental fusion, Bollywood mashup and ghazals. As the band gained popularity, the team decided to add new instruments like the octopod or keyboard. However, Singh expressed a lack of interest in electronic instruments.

Swaraag performs live with a blend of folk and Sufi music, and songs performed by singers like Ustad Nusrat Fateh Ali Khan and Rahat Fateh Ali Khan. Instrumental fusion and Indo-Western instrumental jamming sessions are some of the major highlights of the on-stage performances by Swaraag.

== Team ==
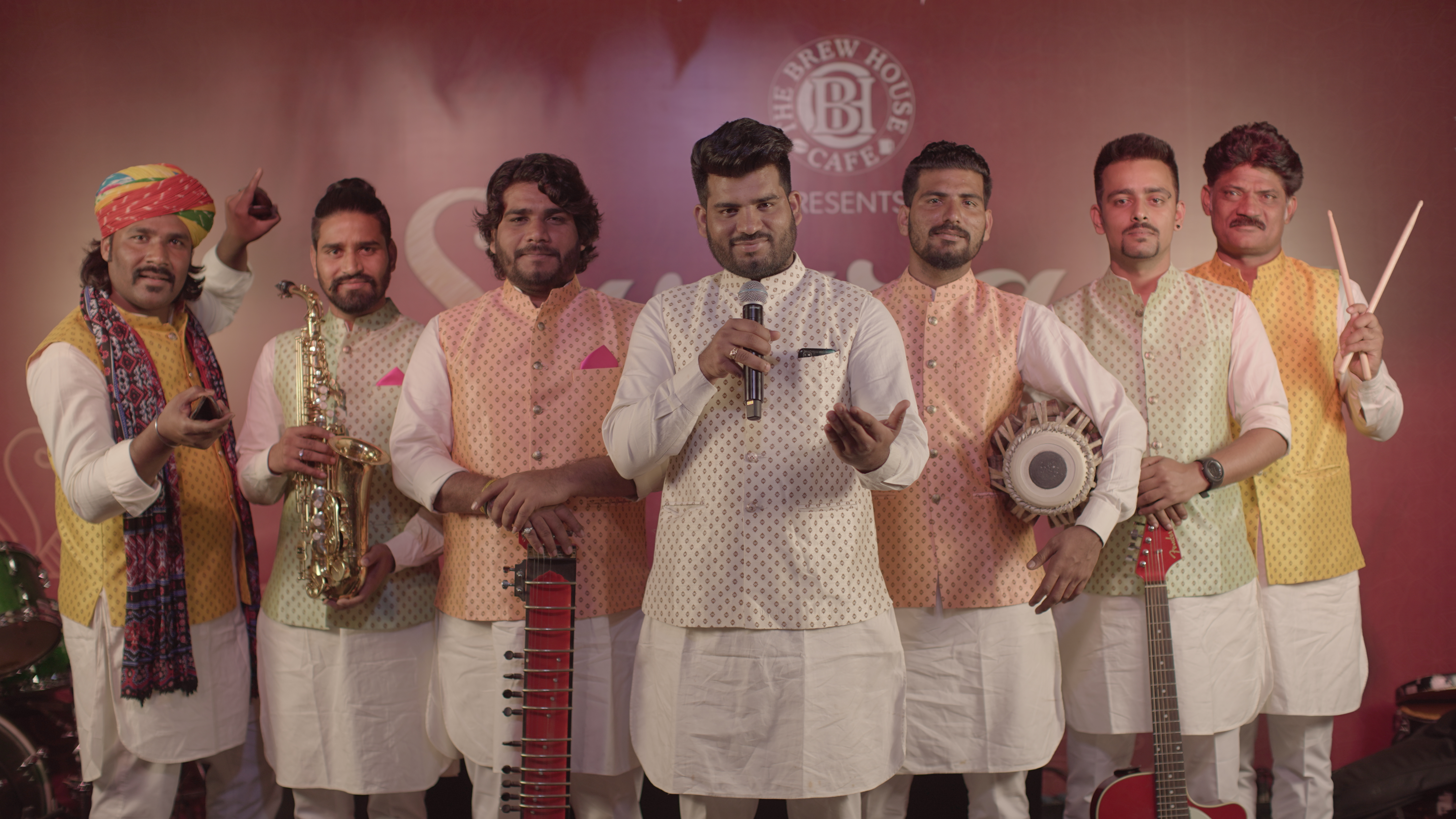
Swaraag at Brew House Cafe, Bhelapur, Mumbai during a show in 2019

=== Pratap Singh Nirwan ===
Pratap Singh is the founder and team coach of Swaraag. The main idea is to portray the traditional Indian art and culture to global platforms. His intention behind Swaraag was to popularize traditional Indian music by creating a new genre of Indo-western fusion.

Swaraag has stated it aims to re-establish traditional Indian folk music with an Indo-western fusion music.

=== Mohammad Asif Khan ===
Mohammad Asif Khan is the voice of Swaraag. He is trained in Rajasthani folk and Sufi music. In his early days, he was trained by his father, Ustad Mahmood Khan. He believes that the younger generation has more influence from western music as compared to classical Indian music, and aims to respond to this by uplifting traditional Indian music. His raw, powerful and versatile voice has been called the signature style of the band. Many of his live audience have felt that his voice reminds them of the late Nusrat Fateh Ali Khan. His unique style of playing the harmonium has been said to fit well with the overall musical instruments and arrangements by other Swaraag band members.

=== Arif Khan ===
Arif Khan is the sitar player. His talent was polished by his father, Ustad Mahmood Khan. By the age of 6, Khan was playing various instruments and his love for the sitar was undeniable. He has showcased his talent globally. His music genre belongs to the Sikar Gharana. His in-depth knowledge about music also helps him to come up with his own compositions.

=== Other team members ===
- Arif Khan (khartal-morchang player)
- Sajid Khan (drummer)
- Tasruf Ali (saxophonist)
- Reyshab Rozzer (acoustic guitar player)
- Mohammad Seif Ali (tabla player)
- Hansraj (former khartal-morchang player)
- Kishore Kumar (former acoustic guitar player)
- Giriraj Purohit (manager)
- Karanpal Singh Nirwan (manager)

== Discography ==
- Teri Deewani, February 2020, Sony Music India
- Padharo Mhare Des, February 2020, Sony Music India
- Piya Mharo, April 2019, The Orchard Enterprises
- Udiyo Re Udiyo, May 2020, The Orchard Enterprises

== Awards ==
- JPC Awards 2016
- WOW LQ Award
