= Life Hill Gayi =

Indian TV series

- Promotional release poster
- Genre: Comedy drama
- Story by: Suprith Kundar, Jasmeet Singh Bhatia
- Directed by: Prem Mistry
- Starring: Divyenndu; Kusha Kapila; Mukti Mohan
- Country of origin: India
- Original language: Hindi
- No. of episodes: 6

Production
- Producer: Arushi Nishank
- Running time: 30-40 mins
- Production company: Himshrri Films

Original release
- Network: Disney+ Hotstar
- Release: 9 August 2024

Life Hill Gayi is an Indian Hindi-language comedy-drama television series written by Suprith Kundar, Jasmeet Singh Bhatia and directed by Prem Mistry. Produced by Arushi Nishank under Himshrri Films, it stars Divyenndu, Kusha Kapila and Mukti Mohan. The series premiered on Disney+ Hotstar on 9 August 2024.

== Cast ==
- Divyenndu as Dev
- Kusha Kapila as Kalki
- Mukti Mohan as Hima
- Vinay Pathak as Himalaya, father of Dev and Kalki
- Atul Srivastava as Kripaal, manager at hotel and uncle of Hima
- Ishtiyak Khan as Bisht, security officer at Hotel
- Hemant Pandey as Negi, chef at hotel
- Annapurna Soni as Sushama, receptionist at hotel
- Gyan Prakash as Sarpanch of village Panchmoli
- Sachin Negi as Badoni, housekeeper at hotel
- Shashie Verma as Chammach Chalisi, murderer
- Meenal Sahu as Shreya, Dev's ex-girlfriend (guest appearance)
- Aditi Govitrikar as Smriti (guest appearance)
- Bhagyashree as mother of Dev and Kalki, (guest appearance)
- Kabir Bedi as Prithivi, grandfather of Dev and Kalki

== Production ==
The series was announced by Himshrri Films. Initially titled "Kaphal" and launched with the title "Life Hill Gayi". Principal photography of the series commenced in Nainital, Uttarakhand on the auspicious occasion of Dussehra. The trailer of the series was released on 18 July 2024.

== Soundtrack ==
Life Hill Gayi

Soundtrack album by Abhijit Vaghani
- Released: 9 August 2024 (Series)
- Length: 4:39
- Language: Hindi
- Label: Sangeet Music

All tracks are written by Saaveri Sharma.

Track-List
No.	Title	Singer(s)	Length
1.	"Good Morning"	Digvijay Singh Pariyar	1:02
2.	"Hawa Chalyo"	Kapil Thapa	2:07
3.	"Rupsa Ramoti"	Gopal Babu Goswami	1:30
Total length:			04:39

== Reception ==
Shubhra Gupta of The Indian Express gave the series 1/5 stars. Aishwarya Vasudevan of OTT Play rated the series 2/5 stars. Risha Ganguly of Times Now, awarded the series 2.5 out of 5 stars. Deepa Gahlot of Rediff.com gave the series 3/5 stars.
