= Thai Massage (film) =

2022 Indian film by Mangesh Hadawale

- Directed by: Mangesh Hadawale
- Written by: Mangesh Hadawale
- Produced by: Bhushan Kumar; Imtiaz Ali
- Starring: Gajraj Rao; Divyendu Sharma; Alina Zasobina
- Cinematography: G. Srinivas Reddy
- Edited by: Manish Jaitly
- Music by: Score: Anand Bhaskar; Ajay Jayanthi; Songs: Joi Barua; Guest Composition: Amit Trivedi
- Production companies: Reliance Entertainment; T-Series Films; Window Seat Films
- Distributed by: Reliance Entertainment
- Release date: 11 November 2022
- Running time: 122 minutes
- Country: India
- Language: Hindi

Thai Massage is a 2022 Indian Hindi-language comedy drama film written and directed by Mangesh Hadawale and produced by Imtiaz Ali and Bhushan Kumar. It stars Gajraj Rao, Divyendu Sharma, Sunny Hinduja, Rajpal Yadav, Vibha Chibber and Alina Zasobina. The film was released on 11 November 2022.

== Summary ==
Atmaram Dubey is a middle-class 70-year-old widower who has remained celibate for decades. All of a sudden he has erectile dysfunction, which leads to realisation that he most likely will never have sex again. However, he wants to experience sex one last time. This desire makes him embark on an outrageous voyage of self-discovery that defies society standards.

== Plot ==
Atmaram Dubey (Gajraj Rao) is a retired widower living in Ujjain. He is much loved and respected. He has been celibate for 22 years, because his wife (whom he loved deeply) was paralysed and bedridden for 21 years, and she died a year ago. His family has gathered at the family home to celebrate his 70th birthday. In the middle of the festivities, the family gets a rude revelation that he not only has a passport, but had also recently gone on a secret Bangkok vacation. His children confront him, and then the film unspools in flashback as Atmaram shares his misadventures with his elder son (Sunny Hinduja).

With the onset of erectile dysfunction, Atmaram was hugely depressed. He has tried committing suicide but was saved by Santulan (Dibyendu Sharma), who convinces him to give life another chance. He takes Atmaram to an 85-year-old pehlwan, who advises daily exercise and eating 20 raw onions a day to cure the dysfunction. This remedy works and Atmaram now has strong desire to do the deed one last time before the dysfunction comes back permanently.

Santulan arranges for a prostitute for his "old" friend. When Atmaram chickens out of the arrangement, he then arranges for a passport and ticket to Bangkok for Atmaram to have a boom-boom time. There, a friendly Indian-origin taxi driver (Anil Charanjeett) guides him towards having a good time without getting duped. But Atmaram just can't have meaningless sex. A chance encounter with a Russian travel blogger Rita (Alina Zasobina) changes things. She takes him around town and even takes him to the famous Khao Sok lake where the two bond over the idea of loneliness, being a good human being, and the fact that it's difficult for either of them to have sex with someone they do not have feeling for. This bond helps them see what they need from each other and they end up having sex, as she is attracted to his naïvete.

This narration makes Atmaram's two sons realise that their father is a good human being, and just because he is old, doesn't mean that he is not without emotions, needs, and desires. The family finds closure, and Atmaram's children embrace him, as he cuts the cake celebrating his 70th birthday.

== Cast ==
- Gajraj Rao as Atmaram Dubey
- Divyendu Sharma as Santulan Kumar
- Alina Zasobina as Rita
- Sunny Hinduja as Mukesh Dubey, son of Atmaram
- Rajpal Yadav as Jugnu Bhaiya
- Jeniffer Piccinato as Thai Massage Card Girl
- Vibha Chibber as Mrs. Panchal
- Anurita Jha as Anu Dubey
- Anamika Tiwari as Gungun
- Shashie Vermaa as Vakil Babu
- Aditi Arora as Saloni
- Chandan Anand as Kailash
- Anil Charanjeett as Jhandu Singh
- Rajiv Nema as Vijay, co-passenger

== Soundtrack ==
Joi Barua composed all the songs except “Do You Wanna Boom Boom” which was composed by Amit Trivedi. All the lyrics were penned by Irshad Kamil.

No.	Title	Singer(s)	Length
1.	"Ye Kya Hua"	Mohit Chauhan	4:43
2.	"Do You Wanna Boom Boom"	Sharvi Yadav, Nikhita Gandhi	3:28
3.	"Dheere Dheere"	Amit Trivedi	3:56
4.	"Kyon"	Amit Mishra, Jonita Gandhi	5:29

== Release ==
=== Theatrical ===
The film was released on 11 November 2022.

=== Home media ===
After the theatrical release, the film was released on Netflix for digital streaming.
