= Divyenndu =

Indian actor (born 1983)

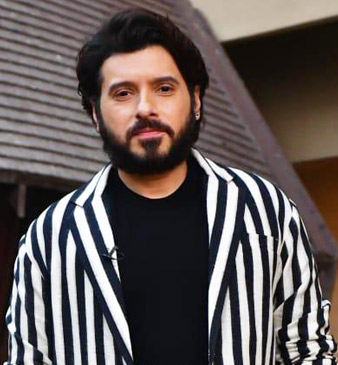
- Divyenndu in 2024
- Born: Divyendu Sharma; 19 June 1983 (age 43); Delhi, India
- Education: Kirori Mal College; FTII, Pune
- Occupation: Actor
- Years active: 2007–present
- Spouse: Akanksha Sharma

Divyendu Sharma (born 19 June 1983), known mononymously as Divyenndu, is an Indian actor who works primarily in Hindi films and series. He had his break-out role in the comedy Pyaar Ka Punchnama (2011), winning the Screen Award for Best Male Debut, after which he played supporting roles in the films Chashme Baddoor (2013) and Toilet: Ek Prem Katha (2017). He gained further attention for his roles in streaming ventures such as the drama series Mirzapur (2018–2020) and the miniseries The Railway Men (2023).

== Early and personal life ==
Divyenndu was born on 19 June 1983 in Delhi, India. He is a graduate in political science from Delhi University's Kirori Mal College. He has three years of theatre experience in Delhi after which he pursued a two-year diploma in acting from FTII, Pune. He was previously seen in a number of ads for brands like Virgin Mobile, Birla Sun Life and Fidelity Mutual Funds. He is married to Akanksha Sharma.

In 2019, Divyenndu dropped his surname citing numerology and his belief that, in a country like India, it's important to remove the many caste divisions. His official documents, however, use his full name.

== Career ==
=== 2007–2017: Early struggle and progress ===
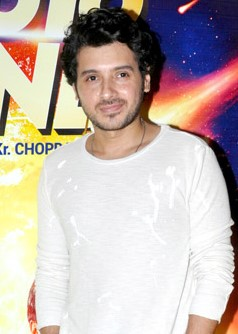
Divyenndu in 2017

He first appeared in a minor role of a goon in Aaja Nachle (2007). He struggled to get work for the next three years. His first major role came in comedy Pyaar Ka Punchnama (2011), where he played a supporting character called Liquid. The film was a sleeper hit and launched his career. The film won him the Screen Award for Most Promising Newcomer – Male. In 2013, Divyendu played the role of the poet Omi in David Dhawan's remake of Chashme Baddoor, another success.

In 2014, he had a supporting role next to Anupam Kher in the satire film Ekkees Toppon Ki Salaami, which got favourable reviews. In 2015, Divyendu starred in his first lead role in the romantic comedy Dilliwali Zaalim Girlfriend, opposite Prachi Mishra. Both of these films were inconsequential to his career.

In 2017, Divyendu gained attention for playing a supporting character named Naru in Toilet: Ek Prem Katha. It starred Akshay Kumar and was one of the biggest hits of the year. In the same year, he appeared in the apocalyptic comedy 2016 The End.

=== 2018–2023: Breakthrough ===
In 2018, he played another secondary role in Shahid Kapoor and Yami Gautam starrer Batti Gul Meter Chalu. Divyendu played the character of Munna Tripathi, a spoilt son of a gangster in the Amazon Prime crime series Mirzapur. The show recorded strong viewership and praise. Divyendu's performance was also renowned and brought him fame. He reprised his role in Mirazpur season 2 with positive reviews in 2020. The show earned him a nomination for the Filmfare OTT Award for Best Supporting Actor (Male) - Drama, and won him the iReel Award for Best Supporting Actor.

Following the success of Mirazpur, he worked in films such as Badnaam Gali (2019), Kanpuriye (2019), Shukranu (2020), Mere Desh Ki Dharti (2022), Odd Couple (2022), and Thai Massage (2023). And also web series like Bicchoo Ka Khel (2020) and Salt City (2022).

In 2023, he landed another popular role in Netflix miniseries The Railway Men based on the 1984 Bhopal disaster. He portrayed Balwant Yadav, a robber masquerading as a police officer who played a key role in rescuing lives during the tragedy.

=== 2024–present ===
In 2024, he starred in Madgaon Express alongside an ensemble cast and received mixed reception. He starred alongside Kusha Kapila and Mukti Mohan in the Disney+ comedy-drama series Life Hill Gayi, playing a privileged young man who is forced to manage a hotel business in a village with his sister. The series received negative to mixed reviews.

== Filmography ==
=== Films ===
Year	Title	Role	Notes	Ref
2007	Aaja Nachle	MLA's Son		
2011	Pyaar Ka Punchnama	Nishant "Liquid" Aggarwal		
2013	Chashme Baddoor	Omkar "Omi" Sharma		
2014	Ekkees Toppon Ki Salaami	Subhash Joshi		
2015	Dilliwali Zaalim Girlfriend	Dhruv Khanna		
2017	Toilet: Ek Prem Katha	Narayan "Naru" Sharma		
2017	2016 The End	Sunny Singh		
2018	Batti Gul Meter Chalu	Sundar Mohan Tripathi		
2019	Badnaam Gali	Randeep Singh Sodhi		
2019	Kanpuriye	Vijay Pal		
2019	Fatafat	Unknown	Short film	
2020	Shukranu	Inder		
2022	1800 Life	Vishal	Short film	
2022	Mere Desh Ki Dharti	Ajay		
2022	Odd Couple	Piyush Mishra		
2022	Thai Massage	Santulan Kumar		
2024	Madgaon Express	Dhanush "Dodo" Sawant		
2024	Agni	Sr. Inspector Samit Sawant	Prime Video film	
2025	Saali Mohabbat	Ratan Pandit	ZEE5 film	
2026	Peddi	Rambujji	Telugu debut film	
2026	Mirzapur: The Movie	Phoolchand "Munna" Tripathi		

=== Television ===
Year	Title	Role	Notes	Ref.
2016	Permanent Roommates	Cameo	1 episode	
2018– present	Mirzapur	Phoolchand "Munna" Tripathi	3 seasons	
2020	Bicchoo Ka Khel	Akhil Shrivastav		
2022	Salt City	Saurabh Bajpai		
2023	The Railway Men	Balwant	Miniseries	
2024	Life Hill Gayi	Dev		
2026	Glory	Devinder Singh		
2026	Waiting Hai	Sugam Mishra		
