= Mukti Mohan =

Indian dancer and actress (born 1987)

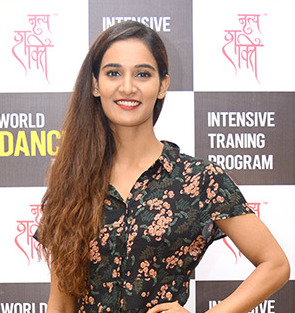
- Mohan at celebrations for World Dance Day 3, 2018
- Born: 21 June 1987 (age 39); Mumbai, Maharashtra, India
- Occupations: Dancer; actress
- Years active: 2007–2017, 2021–present
- Spouse: Kunal Thakur (m. 2023)
- Relatives: Neeti Mohan (oldest sister); Nihar Pandya (brother-in-law); Kriti Mohan (younger sister); Shakti Mohan (older sister)

Mukti Mohan (born 21 June 1987) is an Indian dancer and actress. She participated in Star One's dance reality show Zara Nachke Dikha 2 and emerged as the winner. She also appeared on the comedy show Comedy Circus Ka Jadoo on Sony Entertainment Television. She hosted Dil Hai Hindustani 2 along with Raghav Juyal. She was a contestant on Jhalak Dikhhla Jaa 6 and Fear Factor: Khatron Ke Khiladi 7. She appeared in the films Blood Brothers, Saheb, Biwi Aur Gangster, Hate Story and Daruvu and a YouTube web series Inmates.

== Television ==
- Zara Nachke Dikha 2 (2010) - Contestant
- Jhalak Dikhhla Jaa 6 (2013) - Contestant (5th place)
- Comedy Circus Ka Jadoo (2013) - Contestant
- Nach Baliye 7 (2015) - Guest
- Fear Factor: Khatron Ke Khiladi 7 (2016) - Contestant (2nd runner up)
- Dil Hai Hindustani 2 (2017) - Host
- Gyaarah Gyaarah (2024) - Palak
- Life Hill Gayi (2024) - Hima

== Filmography ==
- Blood Brothers (2007)
- Saheb, Biwi Aur Gangster (2011)
- Muran (2011)
- Daruvu (2012)
- Hate Story (2012)
- Topiwala (2013)
- Kaanchi: The Unbreakable (2014)
- Born Free (2017)
- Dil Hai Hindustani: The Movie (2021)
- Thar (2022) (Netflix film)
- Lust Stories 2 (2023) (Netflix Anthology film)
- Gyaarah Gyaarah (2024) (Zee5 Web series)
- Life Hill Gayi (2024) (Hotstar Web series)
- A Wedding Story (2024)

== See also ==
- List of dancers
