= Sheroes Hangout =

Indian nonprofit cafe

Sheroes Hangout is a cafe and community in India, set up by the Chhanv Foundation and run by survivors of acid attacks. The cafe aims to increase awareness of acid attacks and empower acid attack survivors. The cafe waitresses are survivors of acid attacks, and cafe profits are used for the rehabilitation and treatment of survivors. Survivors are also offered classes that focus on basic skills, crafts, and English conversation. There are currently three cafe locations in Noida, Delhi, Agra , Pune and Lucknow.

== History ==
The first cafe, located in Agra, was opened in 2014 by Alok Dixit of Stop Acid Attacks, a nonprofit based in New Delhi. Since that time, the cafe has expanded to open a second location in Lucknow.

The cafe began as a crowdfunded project, and it operated with a pay what you want model. Early employees did not know how to run a restaurant, so they opted against setting prices, in case they made mistakes. This model remained in place for many years, but the cafe now features a fixed menu with fixed prices, as of 2020.

Prior to working at the cafe, many of the women at Sheroes led solitary lives. They struggled with feelings of shame and trauma. About half of the women were attacked by relatives, and nearly all of them were attacked by people they knew. Oftentimes, they were attacked after rejecting marriage proposals or sexual advances. Following the attacks, some women rarely went outside, in part due to the shame attached to their physical appearance. Some women endured multiple surgeries, and they often struggled to find employment. Furthermore, they sometimes dealt with family or community pressure to stay silent on their attacks.

For these reasons, Sheroes Hangout granted the women a place to find acceptance, community, and a means of income. Some of the women are now the primary earners in their families. The cafe is decorated with colorful murals, and there are books for customers to read on the bookshelves. A documentary on the cafe is available as well. Many of the patrons of the cafe are foreign tourists. As of April 2019, there were nine women working at the cafe in Agra and twelve women working at the cafe in Lucknow.

In April 2021, the cafe closed indefinitely, but it reopened later that year.
