= Dil Hai Hindustani season 2 =

Dil Hai Hindustani
- Season 2
- Hosted by: Mukti Mohan; Raghav Juyal
- Judges: Sunidhi Chauhan; Badshah; Pritam
- Winner: Akshay dhawan

Release
- Original network: Star Plus
- Original release: 7 July 2018

The Second Season of singing reality show Dil Hai Hindustani premiered on 7 July 2018. The show was broadcast on StarPlus and streams on Hotstar. The show was hosted by Mukti Mohan and Raghav Juyal. Sunidhi Chauhan, Badshah and Pritam are judges in the show. The show was produced by Ranjeet Thakur and Hemant Ruprell under Frames Production. The season was won by Akshay Dhawan.

== Top 4 Finalists ==
#	Contestants	Hometown	Singing Category	Notes
1	Akshay Dhawan	Ludhiana, Punjab	Solo	Winner
2	The Mountain Souls Ft.Gaurdeep		Group	Runner-Up
3	Saumya Sharma	Vidisha, Madhya Pradesh	Solo	2nd Runner-Up
4	Radha Shrivastav	Shrawasti, UP	Duet	3rd Runner-Up
4	Divyansh	Jaipur, Rajasthan	Duet	3rd Runner-Up

== Top 6 ==
#	Contestants	Hometown	Country	Notes
1	Radha Shrivastav	Shrawasti, Uttar Pradesh	India	
1	Divyansh	Shrawasti, Uttar Pradesh	India	
2	Akshay Dhawan	Ludhiana, Punjab	India	
3	Saumya Sharma	Vidisha, Madhya Pradesh	India	
4	Sanjeev	Punjab	India	Eliminated on 15 September 2018
4	Robin	Punjab	India	Eliminated on 15 September 2018
5	Michał Rudaś	Warsaw	Poland	Eliminated on 22 September 2018
6	The Mountain Souls Ft. Gaurdeep		India	

== Top 7 ==
#	Contestants	Hometown	Country	Notes
1	Radha Shrivastav	Shrawasti, Uttar Pradesh	India	
1	Divyansh	Shrawasti, Uttar Pradesh	India	
2	Akshay Dhawan	Ludhiana, Punjab	India	
3	Saumya Sharma	Vidisha, Madhya Pradesh	India	
4	Sanjeev	Punjab	India	
4	Robin	Punjab	India	
5	Michał Rudaś	Warsaw	Poland	
6	The Mountain Souls Ft. Gaurdeep		India	
7	Sanvinder Singh Sandhu	Ludhiana, Punjab	India	Eliminated on 9 September 2018

== Top 8 ==
#	Contestants	Hometown	Country	Notes
1	Radha Shrivastav	Shrawasti, Uttar Pradesh	India	
1	Divyansh	Shrawasti, Uttar Pradesh	India	
2	Akshay Dhawan	Ludhiana, Punjab	India	
3	Saumya Sharma	Vidisha, Madhya Pradesh	India	
4	Sanjeev	Punjab	India	
4	Robin	Punjab	India	
5	Michał Rudaś	Warsaw	Poland	
6	The Mountain Souls Ft. Gaurdeep		India	
7	Sumit Misra	Malda, West Bengal	India	Eliminated on 2 September 2018
8	Sanvinder Singh Sandhu	Ludhiana, Punjab	India	Eliminated on 9 September 2018

== Top 13 ==
#	Contestants	Hometown	Country	Notes
1	Radha Shrivastav	Shrawasti, Uttar Pradesh	India	
1	Divyansh	Shrawasti, Uttar Pradesh	India	
2	Akshay Dhawan	Ludhiana, Punjab	India	
3	Saumya Sharma	Vidisha, Madhya Pradesh	India	
4	Sanjeev	Punjab	India	
4	Robin	Punjab	India	
5	Shaazi Ahmed	Jabalpur, Madhya Pradesh	India	Eliminated on 19 August 2018
6	Sarmita Dutta	Kolkata, West Bengal	India	Eliminated on 19 August 2018
7	Michał Rudaś	Warsaw	Poland	
8	Nastya Brava	Moscow	Russia	Eliminated on 29 July 2018
9	Nikhil	Jammu, Jammu & Kashmir	India	Eliminated on 29 July 2018
10	The Mountain Souls Ft. Gaurdeep		India	
11	Desi Divas		India	Eliminated on 5 August 2018
12	Kareena Shomkhova		Russia	Eliminated on 5 August 2018
12	RCR		India	Eliminated on 5 August 2018
13	Behzad Farkhari	Toronto	Canada	Eliminated on 19 August 2018
13	Sankalp Khetwal Project	Dehradun, Uttarakhand	India	Eliminated on 19 August 2018
13	Manuraj	Bharatpur, Rajasthan	India	Eliminated on 19 August 2018
