= Chowkham =

Tehsil in Arunachal Pradesh, India

Coordinates: 27.811°N 96.091°E

Chowkham is a Tehsil in the Indian state of Arunachal Pradesh. Chowkham was part of Lohit district until 2014 and after that became part of the new Namsai district.

Chowkham is located 20 km West of Tezu. It is 286 km from State capital Itanagar towards West. It is one of the 60 constituencies of Legislative Assembly of Arunachal Pradesh. Name of current MLA (October-2016) of this constituency is Chow Tewa Mein.

== See also ==
- List of constituencies of Arunachal Pradesh Legislative Assembly
- Arunachal Pradesh Legislative Assembly
