= Kash-m-kash =

- Starring: See below
- Original language: Hindi

Original release
- Network: DD Metro
- Release: 1995

Kash-m-kash is a TV show broadcast on Doordarshan's DD Metro channel in 1995. The show stars Javed Jaffrey, Suchitra Krishnamoorthi, Aly Khan, Nisha Singh, Aparna Kumar and others. Kash-m-kash TV series made it to the Top 10 series on DD Metro for many weeks running. The music and songs from Kash-m-Kash were released independently to popular demand on then newly privatized Radio Channels.

It was a 26-episode series, written by Haseena Moin and produced and directed by Chanda Narang. Chanda Narang was a Delhi-based Director-Producer of documentary films. Her most popular one being on the Ayodhya and Babri Masjid controversy, released under the title Ayodhya; a City Under Siege. Narang's documentary India's elections '91; The Temple Or The Mosque was released on Englands Channel 4 on 19 May 1991. Narang had extensive coverage of the congress president Rajiv Gandhi's final Electoral trail. Rajiv Gandhi's last interview before his travel to Chennai had been aired on Channel 4 just 3 days before his untimely death. Chanda Narang's topical and salient coverage of the elections and Congress president Rajiv Gandhi, was replayed many times by channel 4 following the assassination of India's Former Prime Minister, Rajiv Gandhi. Narang's documentary found multiple releases in channels about the world, catapulting the young Director and Producer in to visual media's big league.

Kash-m-Kash came four years later after Narang had set up a private video production studio in her home town of New Delhi, and clocked 8 more documentaries; 11 corporate films as well as, over 36 advertising films. Channel 4 in London financed Narang's first maiden feature film based on the darker side of the fictionalized Indian Circus. Kash-m-Kash came as a welcome relief to this director and producer as a light-hearted romance-comedy, with the cast from Mumbai and the crew from New Delhi. New Delhi in the early nineties had seen the advent of the Film City in NOIDA, with film-makers planning big budget shoots in the professional film studios of NOIDA. Studio Images and its Promoter and Chief, Chanda Narang, subsequently shot the first of her next series, Laxmi LLB, at the new Film City, continuing with her successful theme of romance-comedies. Narang's last documentary in 2001 is on the controversial Kashmiri shawl called Shahtoosh, or referred to by animal activists as the 'blood-shawl'.

== Cast ==
- Javed Jaffrey
- Suchitra Krishnamoorthi
- Alyy Khan
- Nisha Singh
- Aparna Kumar
- Roshan Seth

== Synopsis ==
Jaaved Jaaferi and Suchitra Krishnamoorthi play the lead characters. Both the leads have a third person who is interested in them but they're united in the end. Actors Aly Khan and Nisha Singh form the other romantic pair in this series. Well known character actors, Sushma Seth and Roshan Seth, play the single parents to the main lead actress-characters, Suchitra Krishnamoorthi and Nisha Singh.
