= Matoi, Punjab =

Matoi
- Village
- Location in Punjab, India Matoi (India)
- Coordinates: 30.566162°N 75.856591°E
- Country: India
- State: Punjab
- District: Sangrur

Population (2011)
  - Total: 1,693

Languages
  - Official: Punjabi, Hindi
- Time zone: UTC+5:30 (IST)
- PIN: 148023
- Vehicle registration: PB
- Website: punjab.gov.in

Matoi is a village in the Malerkotla district of Punjab, India. Formerly a part of the Sangrur district, it is located in the Malerkotla tehsil.

== Demographics ==
As of 2011 India census, Matoi had a population of 1,693. Males constitute 53.10% of the population and females 46.90%. Matoi has an average literacy rate of 74.67%: male literacy is 82.72%, and female literacy is 65.40%. In Matoi, 9.98% of the population is under 6 years of age.
