= Mitti Cafe =

Chain of cafes in India

Mitti Café
- Founded: 2017
- Founder: Alina Alam
- Type: Social enterprise
- Legal status: Active
- Purpose: Employment and training for adults with disabilities in the hospitality sector
- Region served: India

Mitti Café is a chain of cafes that are completely managed by adults with physical, intellectual, and psychiatric disabilities and are present in more than 40 locations across India, including The Supreme Court of India, Chhatrapati Shivaji Maharaj International Airport - Mumbai, Kempegowda International Airport - Bangalore and corporate Parks such as Mercedes-Benz Research And Development India, RMZ Ecoworld - Bengaluru.

== History ==
Mitti Cafe was founded by Alina Alam in 2017. Since then, Mitti Café has expanded to 16 operational cafes. MITTI Café focuses on training and employing adults with physical, mental and psychiatric disabilities, especially from economically deprived backgrounds, in the hospitality sector.

During the Covid-19 pandemic, Mitti Cafe served over 2 million meals to the poor and vulnerable communities and homeless groups.

Mitti Cafe has won several awards including BMW Group Intercultural Innovation Award, SIF-Deutsche Bank's Made for Good Award, and Bumble Grant.
