= Ashish Shukla =

Indian writer (born 1963)

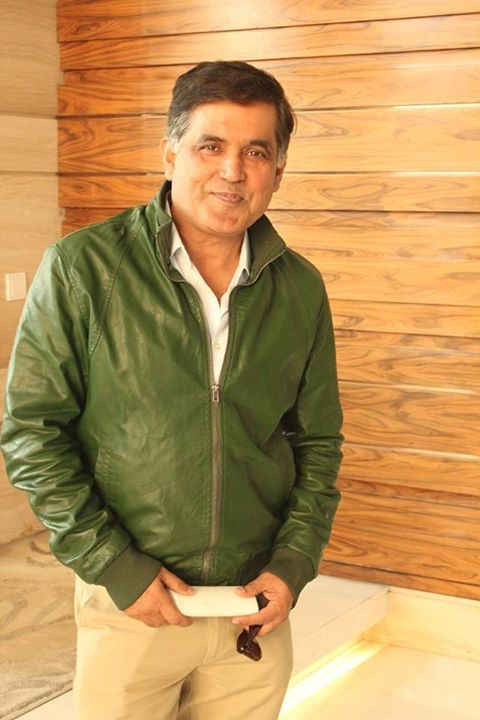
- Born: 16 March 1963 (age 63); Lucknow, India
- Education: Lucknow University
- Occupation: Author
- Spouse: Radhika Shukla (m. 1993)
- Children: 2
- Website: http://www.ashishshukla.net

Ashish Shukla (born 1963) is an Indian writer on geopolitics and terrorism who runs a news website on international relations, Newsbred. Ashish edited the English edition of the world's largest circulated Hindi cricket magazine, Cricket Samrat, in 1999, and was chief operating officer (COO) of Naradonline, one of India's earliest news portals, in 2000.

== Personal life ==
Shukla was born in Lucknow, the capital of India's northern state Uttar Pradesh, on 16 March 1963, the youngest of two brothers and a sister who made up the family of a policeman serving in the state police department. He went to La Martiniere, St. Francis, and Colvin Taluqdars’ College before graduating from Lucknow University, where he achieved his master's in Western History. Shukla moved to Delhi in 1989, where he married a school teacher, Radhika, in 1993. He presently lives in Noida, part of the National Capital Region, and a suburb of Delhi, with his wife and two daughters.

== Career ==
At the age of 16, Shukla accepted an internship at the sports desk of The Pioneer, an English newspaper then operating from Lucknow. He became the sports editor in 1980 while still in his teens. Shukla joined the Times of India on the sports desk, in 1989, where he began covering national and international cricket tours and tournaments.

Shukla undertook an assignment for Agence France-Presse (AFP) to cover the 1996 Cricket World Cup cricket in the Indian sub-continent and followed it up with India's epochal tour to England the same year which gave India two of its most illustrious batsmen and captains, Sourav Ganguly and Rahul Dravid. Shukla was still employed with the Times of India at this time, a position he found increasingly untenable. He left Times of India in 1996 and then began his long informal association with the Press Trust of India (PTI).

His informal association with PTI quickly took roots and he regularly began covering the Indian cricket team's tours worldwide. Such an arrangement also allowed Shukla to be footloose, letting him write articles for Rediff, ESPNcricinfo and voicing his opinion as a cricket expert on BBC and ABC among others. The large reach of PTI gave him a presence in prominent newspapers such as Indian Express, The Economic Times Daily News and Analysis, The Tribune, and national magazines such as Outlook and Tehelka.

In the new millennium, Shukla floated two private limited companies, Trans Cricket News Pvt Ltd, which syndicated articles worldwide under the banner of Cricket News, and Outliers Sports and Media Private Limited. Among clients for Cricket News were Gulf News and Khaleej Times, both published from Dubai, UAE.

This was also the spell when Shukla covered cricket tours for national news TV channels, such as Aaj Tak, Zee News, and Star News, now known as ABP News, among others. He then formally joined India TV as an executive editor in 2007 before finally quitting in 2009 and resuming his association with PTI.

In 2013, he ended his work in cricket journalism. He changed his focus to geopolitics, which has interested him since childhood and which he now deemed to be in a critical phase of its trajectory, to the growing drumbeats of World War III.

== Books ==
During his career as a scribe, Shukla co-authored a biography of the prominent cricketer Sachin Tendulkar. The biography, Sachin Tendulkar: Masterful, was published by Rupa & Co. and went into a reprint order, such was its demand when it first appeared in 2002, even though a few critics didn't have good things to say about the book.

Now as a full-time geopolitical analyst and commentator on international relations, Shukla has made an immediate impact with his book: How United States Shot Humanity: Muslims Ruined; Europe Next, which reflects the contemporary reality of the existential crisis in Europe and Asia and traces its origins to the Yugoslav Wars of the 1990s; and the United States’ support for Saudi Arabia which lost little time in exporting its Wahhabism. The book makes an assertion that this began the export of terrorism on a worldwide scale, caused 9/11 and several attacks on major European cities such as the Madrid train bombings in 2004 and the London tube bombings of 2005. Most of the alleged terrorists involved in these heinous crimes had one or other links with the Balkans, and in particular, Bosnia.

Shukla is presently writing a book on Russia and its president Vladimir Putin which, among other issues, looks at conflicts in the Caucasus in a fresh light. The book is scheduled for release in 2016. The Caucasus, like the Balkans, is a region that lies at the border of Asia and Europe and thus carries forward the narrative of the civilizational conflict of East and West and the global spread of terrorism which Shukla has researched in his work: "How the United States Shot Humanity..."

== Website ==
Ashish presently runs a geopolitical website, Newsbred, a non-profit enterprise, one of its own kind, especially in the Indian context. It has drawn in some international voices in this field, such as Sara Flounders, Shen Dingli, and Joachim Hagopian.

Shukla also has a personal website where his columns, tweets, and television appearances are housed.

== Columns ==
Shukla is a regular contributor on geopolitical and terrorism issues on OpEdNews, which has columns from the world's best-known columnists and authors. He also occasionally pens edit pieces in leading publications, such as Economic Times.

== Bibliography ==
- Ashish Shukla and Peter Murray: Sachin Tendulkar Masterful ISBN 978-8171678068
- Ashish Shukla: How United States Shot Humanity: Muslims Ruined; Europe Next; ISBN 978-8193163108
