= Bombay South Indian Adi-Dravida Sangh School =

Location
- Dharavi, Mumbai, Maharashtra; India; 19.0431391°N 72.8494784°E

Information
- Principal: Mari Arunachalam
- Tuition: 400 rupees (about USD 6) per month

Bombay South Indian Adi-Dravida Sangh School is an English medium low-cost ("budget") private school located in Dharavi, Mumbai, Maharashtra, India. A second story of the school's building is being constructed. Tuition fees are 400 rupees (about USD 6) per month. The school was mentioned in a New York Times blog on 2 January 2014, which explained that some budget private schools might close if infrastructure requirements imposed by India's 2009 Right of Children to Free and Compulsory Education Act were enforced, since the school lacks a playground and wheelchair ramp.
