= Vijay Raaz =

Indian actor and comedian (born 1963)

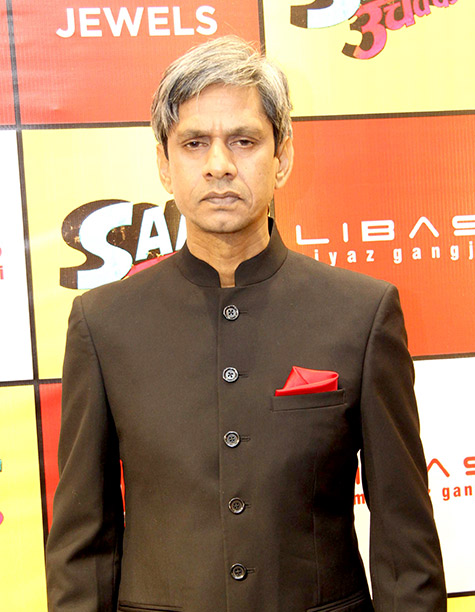
- Raaz in 2016
- Born: 5 June 1963 (age 63); Delhi, India
- Education: P.G.D.A.V. College
- Occupations: Actor; Film director; Comedian
- Years active: 1999–present
- Spouse: Krishna Raaz
- Children: 1

Vijay Raaz (born 5 June 1963) is an Indian actor, film director and narrator, who predominantly appears in Hindi films. He debuted with Bhopal Express (1999) and since worked in more than 90 films. His breakthrough came when he played the role of Dubeyji in the movie Monsoon Wedding in 2001. Raaz garnered recognition for his comedic role in Run (2004) and Dhamaal (2007). He is noted for playing gangster roles in Delhi Belly (2011) and Dedh Ishqiya (2014) as well as other notable films include Stree (2018), Zoya Akhtar's Gully Boy (2019), Lootcase (2020), Sanjay Leela Bhansali's Gangubai Kathiawadi (2022). In 2014, he debuted as a director with Kya Dilli Kya Lahore. His gruff baritone voice has been used in voice-over work, including films and commercials.

== Early life and career ==
Raaz was born on 5 June 1963 in Delhi, India. During his studies at the Pannalal Girdharlal Dayanand Anglo Vedic College of the University of Delhi, he was a part of the dramatic society.

Raaz decided to focus on a film career and moved to Mumbai where he gained a small but significant role in Ram Gopal Varma's 2000 film, Jungle. He did a cameo in the episode 1 of Jaspal Bhatti's television series Flop Show. Naseeruddin Shah had seen him perform at the National School of Drama and recommended him to Mahesh Mathai for Bhopal Express and to Mira Nair for Monsoon Wedding. After the success of Monsoon Wedding, Raaz received many roles. His first mainstream film cast as the leading actor was Raghu Romeo, a box-office success where Raaz depicts the life of a confused lower-class Indian fellow.

Raaz garnered recognition for his comedic role in the 2004 film Run. Subsequently, Raaz, was seen essaying comedic roles in further films like Dhamaal, Welcome, Fool & Final and Deewane Huye Paagal. In 2011, he played a ruthless crime boss in Delhi Belly.

== Filmography ==
Key
†	Denotes films that have not yet been released

=== Films ===
Year	Title	Role	Notes
1999	Bhopal Express	Badru	
2000	Jungle	Deshu	
2000	Dil Pe Mat Le Yaar	Raju Bhai	
2001	Aks	Yeda Yakub	
2001	Monsoon Wedding	P. K. Dubey	Nominated for Best Comedian in Zee Cine Awards
2002	Company	Koda Singh	
2002	Lal Salaam	Ghisu	
2002	Shakti: The Power	Beeja	
2002	Road	Mad wayfarer on road	
2003	Paanch	Anish Ranjan (Nikhil's Father)	
2003	Mumbai Matinee	Baba Hindustani	
2003	Chura Liyaa Hai Tumne	Chingar	
2003	Pran Jaye Par Shaan Na Jaye	Ganpat (Narrator)	
2003	Khel – No Ordinary Game		
2003	Mudda – The Issue	Lemur	
2004	Love in Nepal	Tony	
2004	Run	Ganesh	Nominated for Best Performance in a Comic Role in Screen Weekly Awards
2004	Yuva	Dablu	
2004	Aan: Men at Work	Waman	
2004	Raghu Romeo	Raghu	First lead role National Award for Best Hindi Film
2004	Prarambh - The Beginning	Bholu	
2004	Morning Raga	Mr. Shastri	English film
2004	American Daylight	Pratap (Pat)	English film
2004	Hari Om	Hari Om	
2005	Mumbai Xpress	Digamber Bavdekar	
2005	Shabnam Mausi	Halima	
2005	Dansh		
2005	Deewane Huye Paagal	Babloo Pandey (Rocky's friend)	
2007	Fool & Final	Dinky (Munna's friend)	
2007	Bombay To Goa	Dasa	
2007	Dhamaal	Dev Kumar "DK" Malik	
2007	Anwar	Master Pasha	
2007	Welcome	Fake Director	
2008	Hari Puttar	Rajesh Kapadia	
2008	Manoranjan	Subbu	
2008	Memsahab - Lost In A Mirage		
2008	Tandoori Love	Rajah	
2009	Delhi 6	Inspector Ranvijay	
2009	Dekh Bhai Dekh	Charan	
2009	Barah Aana	Yadav	
2009	Ek Se Bure Do		
2009	Yeh Mera India	Noor	
2009	Jugaad	Murli	
2010	No Problem	The man trying to die	
2010	Ek Aadat	Natha Lal / Don	
2010	West Is West	Tanvir	
2011	Bin Bulaye Baraati	Chetta Singh	
2011	Delhi Belly	Somayajulu	
2011	Ek Tho Chance		
2011	Gali Gali Chor Hai	Chunnu Farista	
2012	Department	Sawatya	
2012	Daal Mein Kuch Kaala Hai		
2012	Aalaap		
2012	Ata Pata Lapata	Munshiji	
2013	Pocket Gangsters	Madhubali	
2013	KQ	Don	Malayalam film
2014	Dedh Ishqiya	Jaan Mohammad	
2014	Mr Joe B. Carvalho	M.K	
2014	Kya Dilli Kya Lahore	Rehmat Ali	
2014	O Teri	Bhanwar Singh Kilol	
2014	Diltective Raj		
2015	Kaaki Sattai	Durai	Tamil film
2015	Second Hand Husband	Inspector Rakesh	
2015	Welcome Back	Narrator	
2015	Monsoon Mangoes	Prem Kumar	Malayalam Film
2015	Pocket Gangsters	Madhubali	
2015	Baankey Ki Crazy Baraat	Lallan	
2015	Hai Golmaal in White House		
2016	Sanam Teri Kasam	Mustaqeen	
2016	Santa Banta Pvt Ltd	Arvind	
2016	Gandhigiri	(Narrator)	
2016	Dishoom	Khabri Chacha (cameo)	
2016	Saat Uchakkey	Jaggi	
2018	Kaalakaandi		
2018	Soorma	Coach Harry	
2018	Lupt	Dev	
2018	Pataakha	Shanti Bhushan Meena	
2018	Nawabzaade	Inspector Kathor Singh	
2018	Stree	Shastri	
2019	Gully Boy	Aftab Shakir Ahmed	
2019	Photograph	Tiwari	
2019	Ferrous	"The Cleaner"	
2019	Setters	Nizam	
2019	Chopsticks	Faiyaz bhai	Netflix Film
2019	Waah Zindagi	Banna	
2019	Made in Heaven	Jauhari	TV series
2019	Dream Girl	Inspector Rajpal Kirar	
2019	Officer Arjun Singh IPS Batch 2000	Kundan	
2019	Kanpuriye	Lampat Harami	Hotstar Specials Film
2019	Bala	Hair (Narrator)	
2020	Gulabo Sitabo	Gyanesh Shukla	Released on Amazon Prime Video
2020	Lootcase	Bala Rathore	Hotstar Film
2020	PariWar	Gangaram	Arre Web series
2020	Suraj Pe Mangal Bhari	Chinmay Godbole	
2021	Sherni	Hassan Noorani	Released on Amazon Prime Video
2021	Toofaan	Jafar Bhai	Special appearance; Released on Amazon Prime Video
2021	Kya Meri Sonam Gupta Bewafa Hai?	Sanjeev Nagraj	Released on ZEE5
2021	Pagli Shaadi Go Dadi	Vikas	
2022	Gangubai Kathiawadi	Razia Bai	
2022	36 Farmhouse	Raunak Singh	Released on ZEE5
2022	Janhit Mein Jaari	Keval Parjapati	
2022	Shabaash Mithu	Sampath Sir	
2022	Vikram Vedha	Narrator (Trailer)	
2022	Odd Couple	Yogesh Pant	Amazon Prime Video
2023	Kathal	MLA Munnalal Pateria	Netflix film
2023	Dream Girl 2	Sona Bhai	
2023	Aankh Micholi	Bhatti	
2024	Showtime	Saajan Morarka	Disney+Hotstar
2024	Murder In Mahim	Shivajirao Jende	JioCinema
2024	Kartam Bhugtam		
2024	Chandu Champion	Tiger Ali Singh	
2024	JNU: Jahangir National University	Ravindra Tokash	
2024	Vicky Vidya Ka Woh Wala Video	Police officer Laadle	
2024	Bhool Bhulaiyaa 3	Raja Saab	
2024	Naam	Shyamlal	
2025	Fateh	Satya Prakash	
2025	Udaipur Files	Kanhaiya Lal Sahu	
2026	Pati Patni Aur Woh Do	Dharamveer Singh	
2026	Pooja Meri Jaan		
TBA	Untitled Anees Bazmee film †	TBA	Filming

=== Television ===
Year	Title	Role	Notes
2003	Karishma – The Miracles of Destiny	Ladoo	
2019	Made in Heaven	Ramesh Jauhari	
2020	A Suitable Boy	Rashid's father	
2020	PariWar	Gangaram Tripathi	
2020	A Simple Murder	Narrator	
2022	Abhay	Mrityu	
2024	Maamla Legal Hai	Narrator	
2024	Showtime	Saajan Morarka	
2024	Murder in Mahim	Shivajirao Jende	
2025	Jamnapaar	Shaukeen Bhaiya	
