= Dil Pe Mat Le Yaar!! =

2000 Bollywood drama film

Dil Pe Mat Le Yaar
- Theatrical release poster
- Directed by: Hansal Mehta
- Written by: Saurabh Shukla; Hansal Mehta
- Produced by: Ajay Tuli; Anish; Hansal Mehta
- Starring: Manoj Bajpayee; Tabu; Saurabh Shukla; Aditya Srivastava
- Cinematography: Sanjay Kapoor
- Edited by: Girish Madhu
- Music by: Score: Raju Singh; Songs: Vishal Bhardwaj
- Release date: 29 September 2000 (India)
- Country: India
- Language: Hindi

Dil Pe Mat Le Yaar!! (transl. Don't take it to heart, friend!!) is a 2000 Indian comedy-drama film directed by Hansal Mehta, written by Saurabh Shukla and produced by Ajay Tuli, Anish and Hansal Mehta. It stars Manoj Bajpayee, Tabu, Saurabh Shukla and Aditya Srivastava in pivotal roles.

== Plot ==
An innocent simpleton Ram Saran Pandey leaves his village for Mumbai to make his earnings. He leaves behind his parents and promises them that he will call them to the city once he is stable. In the bustling city, he gets a job as a car mechanic. Kamya Lal, a journalist, visits the car garage as a customer and is bowled over by his innocence and honesty. She makes up her mind to write articles on his life and make him popular among the social circles. Soon, the mutual admiration develops into a good friendship and Ram falls in love with her. However, she rebuffs him on every proposal.

On one night, Ram accidentally spots Kamya in a compromising position with another person in her apartment and this breaks his heart. He decides to shed his innocence, takes the rough path to propose her, and ends up being a don in town.

== Cast ==
- Manoj Bajpayee as Ram Saran Pandey
- Tabu as Kamya Lal
- Aditya Srivastava as Tito
- Saurabh Shukla as Gaitonde
- Divya Jagdale as Gayatri
- Kishor Kadam as Bhaskar Shetty
- Vijay Raaz as Raju Bhai
- Harsh Chhaya as Ali
- Prithvi Zutshi as Suleman Patil
- Gajraj Rao as Tiwariji
- Anupam Shyam
- Rakesh Kumar
- Kashmera Shah as a item song dancer
- Mahesh Bhatt as himself

== Soundtrack ==
The music is composed by Vishal Bhardwaj. Lyrics were written by Abbas Tyrewala except the song "Paagal" which was written by Piyush Mishra.

Song	Singer
"Dil Pe Mat Le Yaar"	Asha Bhosle
"Lai Ja Re Badra"	Sanjeev Abhyankar
"Jee Jee"	Kavita Krishnamurthy, Udit Narayan
"Chal Padi"	Roop Kumar Rathod, Suresh Wadkar
"Haule Haule"	KK
"Pagal"	Kavita Krishnamurthy, Abhijeet
"Swagatham"	Hariharan

== Reception ==
=== Critical response ===
Taran Adarsh of IndiaFM gave the film 1.5 out of 5, writing, "On the whole, DIL PE MAT LE YAAR is a semi-art, semi-commercial film that will appeal to a select few in Mumbai, but those looking for 'masala' will be thoroughly disappointed. Businesswise, the film might fare well at select theatres of Mumbai city, but beyond the boundaries of the city, it will find itself in troubled waters. Having been released with several big projects will also tell on its business." Sharmila Taliculam of Rediff.com called the film "striking" despite being an "unoriginal small-town boy coming to the dream city story" while Kanchana Suggu from the same publication called it an "honest film" which "touches your heart."

=== Audience reception ===
Residents of Koliwada were not happy with few dialogues about the community in the film. According to them, these dialogues were "offensive" and "reflected poorly on their community." On 1 November 2000, Hansal Mehta was manhandled in his office by a group of agitators. According to Mehta, "On reaching his office, he found a belligerent group of nearly 40 people who were mainly fisherwomen residing in Koliwada and a few men. In spite of his apologies and reassurances about cleaning the dialogues, the discussion degenerated into abuses. Ultimately, he was accosted by the women who splattered him with ink and tore at his clothing,"
