= 800 (film) =

Biographical sports film

- Theatrical release poster
- Directed by: M. S. Sripathy
- Written by: M. S. Sripathy; Shehan Karunatilaka
- Produced by: Vivek Rangachari
- Starring: Madhur Mittal
- Cinematography: R. D. Rajasekhar
- Edited by: Praveen K. L.
- Music by: Ghibran
- Production company: Movie Train Motion Pictures
- Release date: 6 October 2023
- Running time: 158 minutes
- Country: India
- Language: Tamil

800 is a 2023 Indian Tamil-language biographical sports film based on the life and career of Sri Lankan international cricketer Muttiah Muralitharan, the highest wicket-taker in the history of cricket. The film is directed by M. S. Sripathy, written by him and Shehan Karunatilaka, produced by Movie Train Motion Pictures and Vivek Rangachari, and presented by Sridevi Movies, Sivalenka Krishna Prasad. It stars Madhur Mittal as Muralitharan.

The film was released on 6 October 2023.

== Plot ==
800 is based on Muthiah Muralidaran's life, the champion who set the record for taking 800 wickets in Test Cricket. The story captures the many facets of Muralidaran's life; the tale of an oppressed Tamil and someone who was once called for chucking who championed Sri Lankan Cricket, and went on to become one of the greatest cricketers ever.

It reveals how Murali finds solace in cricket, stands up to bullies, and transforms from an excitable pace bowler into the highest wicket-taker in cricket's history. It also dives deep into the issue of nationality versus humanity. Murali, being an ethnic Tamil, has to prove his commitment to the Sri Lankan team and fans. The film also gives insight into the tumultuous period surrounding his 'controversial' bowling and how it briefly derailed his cricket career.

== Cast ==
- Madhur Mittal as Muttiah Muralitharan
  - Prithvi as the 12-year-old Muttiah Muralitharan
  - Rithvik as the 6-year-old Muttiah Muralitharan
- Mahima Nambiar as Madhimalar and Radhimalar
- King Ratnam as Arjuna Ranatunga
- Nassar as Mugunthan Sathasivam
- Vela Ramamoorthy as Muttiah (Murali's father)
- Vadivukkarasi as Angammal
  - Riythvika as the younger Angammal
- Narain as Master
- Hari Krishnan as Vinoth
- Janaki Suresh as Lakshmi
- Sharath Lohithaswa as T. K. Hanaan
- Yog Japee as Chandra Schaffter
- Rukshanth Ram as Kumar Sangakkara
- Dileepan as Manohar
- Aruldoss as Muthiah's friend
- Ananth Nag as Cricket Player
- Vinod Sagar as LTTE member
- Rethika Srinivas as Trinity College teacher

Tom Hackett as Vince Wells

== Production ==
The film was originally announced with Vijay Sethupathi starring, and he received criticism. Muralitharan released a statement requesting the actor to drop out, citing he did not want Sethupathi to "face any kind of trouble". Critics had lamented Muralitharan's neutral stance during the Sri Lankan civil war and his support for Mahinda Rajapaksa's political party after the conclusion of the war. While Tamil Nadu's political parties also spoke out against the making of the film, supporters of the project stated that Muralitharan's story would be important in telling the untold story of Indian Tamils of Sri Lanka.

== Critical reception ==
Srinivasa Ramanujan of The Hindu wrote, "Like Murali's reticent and almost-hesitant approach to the sport, the film just touches on many aspects of his life, largely sticking to the facts and thus coming across as just a visual record of the cricketer’s glorious achievements". Sajesh Mohan of Onmanorama wrote "M S Sripathy, Madhur Mittal, and the '800' team can take pride in the fact that they have narrated the tale of one of cricket's greatest legends, Muttiah Muralitharan, in the best possible manner. That said, the 2 hours and 39 minutes long film feels like a montage of The Magician's life that, at the same time, works for and against the movie."
