= Delhi Safari =

2012 Indian film by Nikkhil Advani

- Indian theatrical release poster
- Directed by: Nikkhil Advani
- Written by: Nikkhil Advani; Girish Dhamija; Suresh Nair; Milap Zaveri (dialogue)
- Story by: Nikkhil Advani
- Produced by: Anupama Patil
- Starring: Govinda; Akshaye Khanna; Suniel Shetty; Boman Irani; Urmila Matondkar; Swini Khara
- Edited by: Aarif Sheikh
- Music by: Shankar–Ehsaan–Loy
- Production companies: Fantastic Films International; Krayon Pictures
- Distributed by: Shemaroo Entertainment
- Release date: 19 October 2012
- Running time: 92 minutes
- Country: India
- Language: Hindi

Delhi Safari (also known as Jungle Safari) is a 2012 Indian Hindi-language computer-animated musical comedy film written and directed by Nikkhil Advani. The film traces the journey of five animals from Mumbai to Delhi as they struggle against an oppressive regime. It has been produced by Krayon Pictures (a Pune-based 3D animation studio). Based on a story and concept by Advani, the film's Hindi-language version features the voices of Govinda, Akshaye Khanna, Suniel Shetty, Boman Irani and Urmila Matondkar. The screenplay of the film is written by Girish Dhamija and Suresh Nair. The music of the film is composed by Shankar–Ehsaan–Loy, while the lyrics are penned by Sameer. It is India's first stereoscopic 3D animation feature film. The film released in India on 19 October 2012. At the 60th National Film Awards, it won the National Film Award for Best Animated Film. The English-language dubbed version of the film has voices by Tom Kenny, Carlos Alazraqui, Jason Alexander, Cary Elwes, Tara Strong, Christopher Lloyd, Jane Lynch, Vanessa Williams and Brad Garrett. The international sales of the film is being handled by Fantastic Films International. The film was released in the United States on 7 December 2012.

== Plot ==
The film starts with Yuvraj (or 'Yuvi', for short) saying that he lost his father, Sultan, in the morning but doesn't want to lose his home at any cost. The film carries a flashback of the morning with Yuvi and Sultan playing in the forest and Sultan teaching self defense to Yuvi while his mother, Begum, enters. The two mock her for her overly caring attitude towards her son, which gets her angry, and she leaves. Soon, Begum forgives Sultan and Yuvraj. However, while coming back, a whole pack of bulldozers come from nowhere and proceed to demolish the surrounding jungle. Begum manages to escape, but Yuvi and Sultan are trapped. The two land at a site in the forest where they see all the trees missing. In a bid to save Yuvi, Sultan catches Yuvi in his mouth and tosses him to Begum. However, he himself is killed by a human wielding a shotgun, making the whole forest a large enemy of the humans. A talk happens with attendants of all the animals in the area. Many believe that leaving their homes is the only way to survive; however, Bajrangi, a monkey, says that he would beat out the wits of those men with his so-called "vanarsena" - Marela and Bharela, but Bagga the bear advises him to talk to humans, and Bajrangi asks whether there is anyone who knows the language of humans. A white bird, seemingly a pigeon, Hawa Hawaai pipes up, saying he knows someone who knows both animal and human languages. Yuvi meets the white bird the next day and asks who is the one he said about. The white bird says the animal he spoke of is Alex, a parrot who lives with a director, Vikram Khosla. Bajrangi, his "army" of two monkeys, Hawa Hawaai, Bagga, and Yuvi, go and kidnap the parrot and convince him to go to Delhi with them to talk to the parliament and save their land. Initially refusing, Alex agrees to go to Delhi. Begum, Bagga, Bajrangi, and his army board a train to Delhi from Mumbai. Yuvi joins them after some time. They then reach Gujarat with guidance from Raju, a bat. In Gujarat, they meet flamingos and a couple who gives them shelter in their homes. One of the flamingos strictly advises them not to cross the Banyan tree to avoid the hyena Kaalia and his gang. However, Bajrangi goes there and ties Alex for Kaalia to kill him so that no one can doubt him. Yuvi spots Bajrangi and confronts him, but they are spotted by Kaalia. Begum arrives in time to save them.

After this incident, Alex pretends to have lost his voice. The animals consult a doctor who prescribes some ayurvedic medicines to recover Alex's voice, claiming that he has hypertension, stress, and high blood pressure. Bajrangi wholeheartedly does the hard work, sometimes getting injured. One day, he discovers that Alex was just pretending and chases him, inadvertently hitting a beehive. All the animals run with bees chasing them. A thrilling experience of trains follows after Bajrangi tells Alex how guilty he feels of thinking to kill him. Alex also realizes how selfish he was and decides to help the animals. Begum tells that no one is going to Delhi after listening to a tiger's story of how he only survived death at a human's hands by being a coward and forsaking his old ways; thankfully, following a pep talk and seeing Sultan's spirit and Yuvi, who inspires them, Begum changes her mind and, with renewed hope, proceeds to Delhi. They finally reach Delhi and tell their message through Alex to the Prime Minister of the country that they want peace between humans and animals and how Yuvi inspired all of them to go to Delhi despite all the incidents. In the last scene, it is shown the jungle is saved courtesy of a shared land act (with the area being called the "Sanjay Gandhi National Park-Borivali") and all are happy and settled. The film ends with all animals settled in the jungle, with Yuvi seeing his father's spirit and Begum happy.

== Cast ==
=== Hindi Version ===
- Govinda as Bajrangi the Monkey
- Akshaye Khanna as Alex the Parrot
- Boman Irani as Bagga the Bear
- Urmila Matondkar as the Begum the Mother Leopard
- Suniel Shetty as Sultan the Father Leopard
- Swini Khara as Yuvraj the Cub Son Leopard
- Prem Chopra as Kaalia the hyena
- Deepak Dobriyal as Hawa Hawai the pigeon
- Sanjay Mishra as Marela
- Saurabh Shukla as Bharela
- Rajesh Kava as Male Flamingo, hyena cook, and Raju Guide
- Akhil Mishra as the Tiger

=== English Version ===
- Carlos Alazraqui as Bajrangi the Monkey
- Tom Kenny as Alex the Parrot
- Brad Garrett as Bagga the Bear
- Vanessa Williams as Begum the Mother Leopard
- Cary Elwes as Bee Commander/Sultan the Father Leopard
- Tara Strong as Yuvraaj "Yuvi" the Son Leopard Cub
- Jason Alexander as Male Flamingo/Hyena Cook
- Christopher Lloyd as Pigeon
- Jane Lynch as Female Flamingo
- Brian George as Bat
- Roger Craig Smith as Bharela/Marela
- JB Blanc as The Director/Prime Minister
- Dave Wittenberg as Kalia the Hyena Leader
- Troy Baker as Tiger
- GK Bowes as News Reporter
- Kate Higgins as Antelope
- Lex Lang as Hyena / News Reporter
- Joe Ochman as Man / News Reporter
- Fred Tatasciore as Hyena

== Soundtrack ==
Delhi Safari

Soundtrack album by Shankar–Ehsaan–Loy
- Released: 2012
- Recorded: 2012
- Genre: Feature film soundtrack
- Language: Hindi
- Label: Artist Aloud

Shankar–Ehsaan–Loy chronology
Chittagong (2012)	Delhi Safari (2012)	Vishwaroopam (2012)

=== Hindi ===
All lyrics are written by Sameer; all music is composed by Shankar–Ehsaan–Loy.

Track list
No.	Title	Singer(s)	Length
1.	"Dil Ki Safari"	Shankar Mahadevan, Raman Mahadevan, Shivam Mahadevan, Hamsika Iyer, Swini Khara	4:17
2.	"Meri Duniya Terey Dam Se"	Shekhar Ravjiani, Mahalakshmi Iyer & Shivam Mahadevan	3:58
3.	"Aao Re Pardesi"	Karsan Sargathia, Tarannum Mallik	3:58
4.	"Dhadak Dhadak"	Shankar Mahadevan, Raghubir Yadav	2:14
5.	"Jungle Mein Mangal"	Shankar Mahadevan	3:05

=== English ===
All lyrics are written by John Majkut and Ian Nickus; all music is composed by Shankar–Ehsaan–Loy.

Track list
No.	Title	Singer(s)	Length
1.	"Delhi Safari"	Vanessa Williams, Keri Larson, Tom Kenny, John Fluker, Carlos Alazraqui, Tara Strong, Alvin Chea, Fred Tatasciore and Christine Miller	4:17
2.	"To Forgive... To Forget"	Vanessa Williams, John Fluker	2:10
3.	"All Day Party, Dance"	Tom Kenny, John Fluker, Carlos Alazraqui, Alvin Chea, Christine Miller, Keri Larson	3:23
4.	"We're on Our Way Now"	Vanessa Williams, Christine Miller, Tom Kenny, Keri Larson, John Fluker, Alvin Chea, Carlos Alazraqui	2:14
5.	"A Mighty Forest There is Not"	Brian George	3:05
6.	"Alex's Song"	Tom Kenny	1:10

The title track was among shortlisted 75 songs which were contender for nominations in the Original Song category for the 85th Academy Awards.

== Release ==
Delhi Safari had its world premiere at Annecy International Animation Film Festival in June 2012. It was theatrically released in India on 19 October 2012.

== Reception ==
=== Critical response ===
On the review aggregator website Rotten Tomatoes, 20% of 15 critics' reviews are positive. Metacritic, which uses a weighted average, assigned the film a score of 37 out of 100, based on 6 critics, indicating "generally unfavorable" reviews. Times of India gave Delhi Safari 3 stars, writing, "With satire, spoof, humour and wit, director, Nikhil Advani has highlighted the ongoing aadmi v/s animal battle, the desperate need for preservation of wildlife and the downside of deforestation. His creatures entertain and tell the story in true Bollywood style (too many songs and too much drama 'foxes' the plot). The problem is, he doesn't cut to the chase, and it turns out to be more like a long safar than a safari. The 3D effects are striking in parts and amongst the best we've seen in India, but few scenes are déjà vu 'Lion King'. Alex and Bajrangi with their histrionics and rip-'roaring' banter are the stars of this show. While the cartoon creatures will appeal to kids, there's more for adults here. The 'real' Men of the jungle that is. So, Hakuna Matata, go watch it once. And take your cubs along." Rohit Khilnani of Rediff gave it 3.5 stars, calling it "a must watch". He further wrote, "Despite the predictable song-and-dance and even the story, Delhi Safari works as the train journey from Mumbai to New Delhi has a few of stops and fun moments that fit well into the plot." It was awarded National Film Award for Best Animated Film at the 60th National Film Awards with a citation "Animation and animal kingdom come together in showcasing the enormous significance of harmonious cohabitation of humans and nature. State-of the-Art Indian technology employed in this film should make us proud!".

Conversely, Miriam Bale of New York Daily News gave a negative review calling the film "without wit and, sadly, entirely forgettable." Neil Genzlinger of The New York Times called the film "shameless rip off much better animated movies", he further wrote "This film is supposed to represent a step forward for Indian animation. The trouble is, there's not an original idea in it."

The film was given "two thumbs up" by animal rights nonprofit organization PETA in a blog post, stating that the film teaches that "human beings must think about how our actions affect other species". PETA also highlighted Jane Lynch's involvement in the film, who is a known supporter of the organization.

=== Box office ===
The film grossed ₹2.2 crore (US$240,000) during its entire run in india. In the United States, it grossed $4,334 in 20 screens in its first weekend. The film was released in South Korea in 2013 where it grossed US$1.83 million and China in 2014 where its lifetime collection is US$1.27 million

=== Accolades ===
Year	Name of Competition/Award	Category	Result	Recipient
2012	FICCI BAF AWARDS 2012	Best Animated Feature Film [Theatrical Release]	Won	Krayon Pictures
2013	60th National Film Awards	Best Animated Film	Won	Producer(s): Anupam Patil, Kishore Patil (Krayon Pictures); Director: Nikhil Advani; Animator: Rafique Shaikh
2013	19th Screen Awards	Best Animation	Won	Delhi Safari

== Sequel ==
In 2015, Krayon Pictures announced an English-language sequel Beijing Safari which they will co-produce with Chinese production house Heshan Media. Tab Murphy will write the film and Daniel St. Pierre is set to direct the film.

== See also ==
- List of Indian animated feature films
