= Saurabh Shukla =

Indian actor (born March 1963)

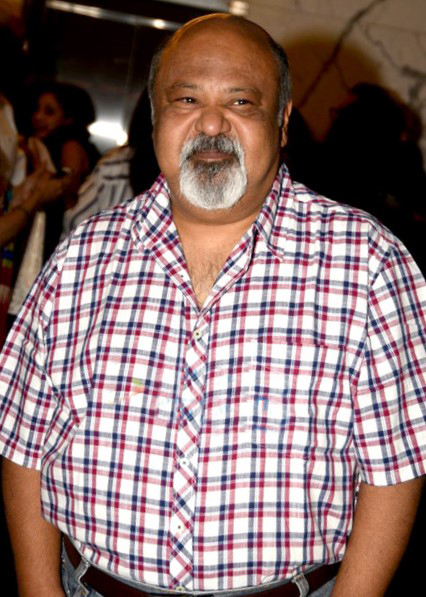
- Shukla at the screening of Sonata
- Born: 5 March 1963 (age 63); Gorakhpur, Uttar Pradesh, India
- Occupations: Actor, film director, screenwriter
- Years active: 1984–present
- Spouse: Barnali Ray

Saurabh Shukla is an Indian actor, screenwriter, and film director who works in Hindi and a few Tamil and Telugu films. He is best known for his roles in Satya (1998), Nayak: The Real Hero (2001), Yuva (2004), Lage Raho Munna Bhai (2006), Barfi! (2012), Jolly LLB (2013); for the latter, he won the National Film Award for Best Supporting Actor. Other notable films are Kick (2014), PK (2014), Jolly LLB 2 (2017) and Raid (2018). He has also worked in a short documentary with Ruth Agnihotri and Rachael Agnihotri in Goa.

== Early life ==
Born to Jogamaya Shukla, who was the first female tabla player of India, and Shatrughan Shukla, a vocalist from Agra Gharana who was the head of department of music and fine arts at Delhi University, Shukla's family left Gorakhpur for Delhi when he was two years old. He completed his schooling from Ludlow Castle No 3 (behind I P College) Delhi and did graduation from S.G.T.B. Khalsa College, Delhi. His professional career began in 1984 with entry into the theatre.

Saurabh's wife is Barnali Ray, who is a filmmaker, writer, and poet.

== Career ==
Shukla began pursuing theatre in 1986 with roles in plays like A View From The Bridge (Arthur Miller), Look Back in Anger (John Osborne), Ghashiram Kotwal (Vijay Tendulkar) and Hayvadan. In 1991, he joined the NSD Repertoire Company – the professional wing of the National School of Drama – as an actor. The following year, he got his first break when Shekhar Kapur, impressed with his work, roped him in for a role in Bandit Queen.

Shukla also played the role of Vijay Anand's sidekick Gopi in the 1994 Doordarshan crime drama Tehkikaat. The series was directed by Karan Razdan, but Shekhar Kapur directed the first episode. He also wrote and acted in Zee TV's 9 Malabar Hill.

He also appeared in a recurring albeit a short role of an Aamir's Jasoos (chieftain's spy) in the 1990s Doordarshan TV serial Mulla Nasiruddin, which had Raghubir Yadav in the lead role. The series was based on the folklore of Mulla Nasiruddin.

Shukla is also a part of a comic theater play 2 to Tango, 3 to Jive.

=== Breakthrough (1998–present) ===
Shukla's biggest break came when he co-wrote the script for Ram Gopal Varma's 1998 cult classic Satya and played the role of gangster Kallu Mama in the film. He won the Star Screen Award for Best Screenplay alongside Anurag Kashyap.

"Why do I make realistic films, like Satya? Because that's the kind of films I like to do. Capturing reality is very difficult and challenging," he said in a 2000 interview to Rediff.com, making it clear that he prefers realism in his scripts. In the same interview he also talked about his preferred genre of film making – comedy:

If you carefully see my work, it is all [comedy]. We usually categorize subjects as comedy and serious. But there is more than just this. Like when we laugh, we sometimes also cry. There can be certain viciousness to this action if there is too much of it. It is the same with romance, which gets too much after a point. There is always a comic element in every situation.

In 2003, he wrote the screenplay for Calcutta Mail. He received his first award for this film, the Zee Cine Award for Best Screenplay. In 2008, he acted in his first international film, the Golden Globe and Academy Award-winning Slumdog Millionaire, as the character Constable Srinivas. In 2013, he appeared as policeman Sudhanshu Dutta in Barfi!, a film through which director Anurag Basu and co-actor Ranbir Kapoor, he said, "revived [him] as an actor".

== Filmography ==
=== Hindi films ===
Key
†	Denotes films that have not yet been released

Year	Film	Role	Notes
1994	Bandit Queen	Kailash	
1996	Is Raat Ki Subah Nahin	Vilas Pandey	
1998	Kareeb	Birju's father	
1998	Zakhm	Gurdayal Singh	
1998	Satya	Kallu Mama	
1999	Taal	Banerjee	
1999	Arjun Pandit	Johnny	
1999	Baadshah	Saxena	
1999	Yeh Hai Mumbai Meri Jaan	Mr. Malhotra "Chhotey"	
2000	Hey Ram	Manohar Lalwani	Bilingual film
2000	Dil Pe Mat Le Yaar!!	Gaitonde	
2000	Mohabbatein	Sanjana's father	
2000	Snip!	Munna	
2001	Nayak: The Real Hero	Pandurang	
2001	Yeh Teraa Ghar Yeh Meraa Ghar	Mama Kaanden	
2001	Moksha	Kale	
2002	Mere Yaar Ki Shaadi Hai	Lachhu Mama	
2002	Karz: The Burden of Truth	Suraj's drunk friend	Uncredited
2003	Yeh Dil	Economics Teacher	
2003	Calcutta Mail	Ghatak	
2003	Raghu Romeo	Mario	
2003	Xcuse Me	Hotel Manager	
2003	Mumbai Matinee	Nitin Kapoor	
2003	Hazaaron Khwaishein Aisi	Senior Bihari Constable	
2003	Mudda - The Issue	Dinanath	
2004	Yuva	Gopal	
2005	Mumbai Xpress	Kishore Mehta	
2005	Yakeen	Chamanlal	
2005	Home Delivery	Pandey	
2005	Kal: Yesterday and Tomorrow	Rajesh Jalan	
2005	Chehraa	Director	
2006	Mixed Doubles	Sammy	
2006	Lage Raho Munna Bhai	Batuk Maharaj	
2007	Salaam-e-Ishq: A Tribute to Love	Dotcom Paaji	
2007	Khoya Khoya Chand	Producer Khosa	
2007	Showbiz	Inder Raj Bahl	
2008	My Name is Anthony Gonsalves	Murthy	
2008	Mithya	Shetty	
2008	De Taali	Godbole	
2008	Hari Puttar: A Comedy of Terrors	Diesel	
2008	Dasvidaniya	Dasgupta	
2008	Oh, My God	God	
2009	Luck By Chance	Nand Kishore	
2009	Love Khichdi	Krishnan	
2009	Chintu Ji	Malkani	
2010	Tera Kya Hoga Johnny	Begum	
2010	Lahore	Madhav Suri	
2010	Paathshaala	Lallan Sharma	
2010	Mirch	Satish	
2011	Utt Pataang	Nandu Pandey	
2011	Yeh Saali Zindagi	Mehta	
2011	Aarakshan	Mantri Baburao	
2011	Shakal Pe Mat Ja	Vijay Dinanath Chauhan	
2011	Pappu Can't Dance Saala	Producer of dance album	
2012	Staying Alive	Shaukat Ali	
2012	I M 24		
2012	Barfi!	Sudhanshu Dutta	Nominated—IIFA Award for Best Supporting Actor Nominated— Apsara Film & Television Producers Guild Awards for Best Actor in a Supporting Role
2012	Delhi Safari	Bharela	Voice only
2012	The Last Act	Theatre troupe director	
2013	David	David's father	
2013	Jolly LLB	Justice Sunderlal Tripathi	National Film Award for Best Supporting Actor; Screen Award for Best Supporting Actor; Nominated—IIFA Award for Best Supporting Actor
2013	Phata Poster Nikhla Hero	Gundappa Das	
2013	Kalpvriksh	Shankar Dada	
2014	Gunday	Kaali Kaka	
2014	Main Tera Hero	Balli	
2014	Gang of Ghosts	Bhoothnath Bhaduri	
2014	Ek Tho Chance	TBA	
2014	Kick	Brijesh Mehra	
2014	PK	Tapasvi Maharaj	
2015	Kaun Kitne Paani Mein	Braj Singh Deo	
2015	Mohalla Assi	Upadhyay Pandit	
2017	Jolly LLB 2	Justice Sunderlal Tripathi	
2017	The Wishing Tree	Dhaba Owner	
2017	Jagga Jasoos	Ex IB Officer Sinha	
2018	Raid	Rameshwar "Rajaji" Singh a.k.a. "Tauji"	
2018	Shabhash Kundu	Robin Roy	
2018	Daas Dev	Awadesh Pratap Chauhan	
2019	Fraud Saiyaan	Murari Chaurasia	
2019	Family Of Thakurganj	Baba Bhandari	
2019	Albert Pinto Ko Gussa Kyun Aata Hai?	Nayyar	Remake of classic Albert Pinto Ko Gussa Kyoon Aata Hai
2019	The Zoya Factor	Yashwant Khoda	
2019	Ujda Chaman	Guruji	
2019	Bala	Hari Shukla	
2019	Pagalpanti	Raja Sahab	
2019	Aadhaar	Parmanand Singh	
2020	Chhalaang	Mr. Shukla	
2021	Madam Chief Minister	Master Suraj Bhan	
2021	The Big Bull	Manu Malpani	
2021	Tadap	Ishana's father	
2022	Shamshera	Doodh Singh	
2022	Drishyam 2	Murad Ali	
2022	Bhediya	Bagga	
2025	Raid 2	Rameshwar Singh "Tauji"	
2025	Maalik	Minister Shankar Singh	
2025	Jolly LLB 3	Justice Sunderlal Tripathi	
2026	Subedaar	Prabhakar	
2026	Everybody Loves Sohrab Handa	Inspector Afzal Qureshi	
2026	Drishyam: The Conclusion	Murad Ali	

=== Other language films ===
Year	Film	Role	Language	Notes
2000	Hey Ram	Manohar Lalwani	Tamil	
2005	Balu ABCDEFG	Khan's brief	Telugu	
2005	Anniyan	Ethirajan Naidu	Tamil	Dubbed as Aparichitudu in Telugu and Aparichit (2006) in Hindi
2005	Allari Bullodu	Karim Lala	Telugu	
2006	Care of Footpath	Ranga	Kannada	
2008	Slumdog Millionaire	Head Constable Srinivas	English	
2016	Dhilluku Dhuddu	Kajal's father	Tamil	Dubbed as Raj Mahal 3 in Hindi.

=== Web series ===
Year	Title	Role	Platform	Notes
2019	The Verdict - State vs Nanavati	Russi Karanjia	ALTBalaji and ZEE5	
2022	Yeh Kaali Kaali Ankhein	Akheraj Awasthi "Vidrohi", Purva's Father	Netflix	
2023	Pop Kaun?	KBC	Disney+ Hotstar	
2025	Bindiya Ke Bahubali	Badaa Davan	Amazon MX Player	
2026	Bindiya Ke Bahubali Season 2	Badaa Davan	Amazon MX Player	

=== As writer and director ===
Year	Film	Director	Producer	Screenwriter	Notes
1998	Satya			Yes	Star Screen Awards for Best Screenplay with Anurag Kashyap
2000	Dil Pe Mat Le Yaar!!			Yes	
2003	Raghu Romeo			Yes	
2003	Calcutta Mail			Yes	Nominated—Zee Cine Award for Best Screenplay
2003	Mudda - The Issue	Yes		Yes	
2005	Chehraa	Yes		Yes	
2005	Mumbai Xpress			Yes	
2007	Salaam-e-Ishq: A Tribute to Love			Yes	co-wrote with Nikhil Advani, Suresh Nair, Rahul Awate
2008	Mithya			Yes	
2009	Acid Factory			Yes	
2009	Raat Gayi Baat Gayi?	Yes		Yes	New York South Asian International Film Festival for Best Film with Rajat Kapoor
2011	Utt Pataang			Yes	
2011	Pappu Can't Dance Saala	Yes	Yes	Yes	
2012	Fatso!			Yes	
2012	I M 24	Yes		Yes	
2023	Dry Day	Yes		Yes	
2026	Jab Khuli Kitaab	Yes		Yes	

=== As lyricist ===
Year	Film	Notes
2006	Mixed Doubles	

== Awards ==
Shukla won the National Film Award and the Screen Award for the Best Actor in a Supporting Role for his performance in Jolly LLB.
