= Aditya Srivastava =

Indian actor

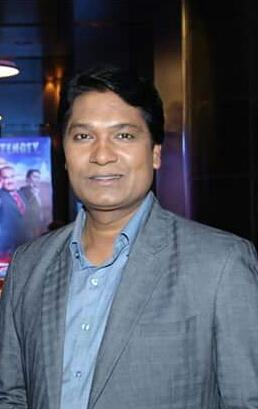
- Srivastava during Press Conference at Le Meridien, Delhi
- Occupations: Actor; voice-over artist; television producer
- Years active: 1992–present
- Known for: Senior Inspector Abhijeet in the TV series, C.I.D.; Badshah Khan in Black Friday
- Notable work: C.I.D., Black Friday, Gulaal, Super 30
- Spouse: Mansi Srivastava (m. 2000)
- Children: 2

Aditya Srivastava is an Indian actor who works in Hindi films, television and theatre. He is best known for his role as Senior Inspector Abhijeet in India's longest-running television police procedural C.I.D. He has also portrayed pivotal roles in the Bollywood films Satya, Gulaal, Lakshya, Paanch, Black Friday, Kaalo, Super 30 and Dil Se Pooch Kidhar Jana Hai.

== Personal life ==
Aditya married Manasi Srivasatava on 22 November 2000. They have two daughters.

== Career ==
While pursuing graduation from Allahabad University, Aditya Srivastava did theatre plays at Sangeet Samiti, Civil lines, Allahabad. To hone his skills and pursue a career in acting, he moved to Delhi in 1989 and was involved in mostly theatre work at Sri Ram Center Of Performing Arts. Spotted by Shekhar Kapoor, he got his first break in the movie Bandit Queen, where he played Puttilal. After this, he moved to Mumbai in 1995. He did many voiceovers for promos and advertisements. He also played pivotal episodic roles in Byomkesh Bakshi, Rishtey and Aahat. Naya Daur, 9 Malabar Hill and Yeh Shaadi Nahi Ho Sakti had him in full-fledged and prominent roles. He took a break from television in 1997 to do films.

He was later offered C.I.D. in 1999, after B. P. Singh noticed him in Satya for playing a cop, after Ashutosh Gowariker left to pursue direction. He had already played a criminal, Paresh in the C.I.D. episode "The Case of the Stolen Gun" by then. Initially reluctant, he signed up for just 26 episodes, which were extended later. His first C.I.D. episode as a cop was "The Case of the Stolen Dynamite".

Meanwhile, he also did many films. He played Murgi, a bassist in Anurag Kashyap's Paanch, which was shot in 2001, and was never released, but got his approval as an actor by the film fraternity when Paanch was shown as the closing film in Osian's Cinefan Festival of Asian and Arab Cinema in 2005. He was offered to play the male lead in Hansal Mehta's Dil Pe Mat Le Yaar, but the role was later given to Manoj Bajpayee, leaving him to play another important character in the same movie named Tito, a Dubai returned entrepreneur. He even provided finance for the making of this movie. His first film playing the single male protagonist, Dil Se Pooch Kidhar Jaana Hai, fetched him appreciation by critics for his performance, though it was a commercial failure as the production house decided to release its sans promotions. He played the lead role in the film Kaalo. He suffered a shoulder injury in a bus accident during the shooting of Kaalo.

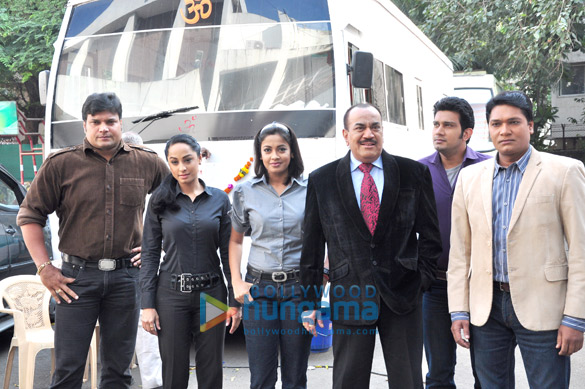
(From L-R) Dayanand Shetty, Ansha Sayed, Janvi Chheda, Shivaji Satam, Vineet Kumar Chaudhary and Aditya Srivastava on the sets of CID.

Internationally, he is known for his work in films like Dil Se.., Mohandas, Dansh, Satya, Matrubhoomi, Black Friday and Gulaal, all of which ran successfully across the International Film Festivals Circuit and had him as critically acclaimed parallel lead. He did many other films and made his presence known in each one of them, as claimed by critics. He prefers non-conventional cinema as it brings depth to his acting, as said by him in an interview.

He is named in the Guinness Book of World Records for shooting the longest uncut sequence in the episode The Inheritance of C.I.D.

A song was recorded for a C.I.D. episode (aired on 21 January 2012), which was a lullaby sung by Aditya Srivastava and his fellow actors Shivaji Satam and Dayanand Shetty. Aditya Srivastava, Shivaji Satam, Dayanand Shetty and Narendra Gupta also appeared in Kaun Banega Crorepati 2014 to raise money for charity.

After a hiatus owing to his tight schedule in the television industry, he is back to the big screen. In 2024, he portrayed Bansi Sahu in the crime-thriller Bhakshak.

== Filmography ==
=== Films ===
Year	Film	Role	Notes
1994	Bandit Queen	Puttilal	
1996	Sanshodhan	Chunni Singh	
1998	Hazaar Chaurasi Ki Maa		
1998	Satya	Inspector Khandilkar	
1998	Dil Se..	Terrorist	
2000	Dil Pe Mat Le Yaar!!	Tito	
2002	Saathiya	ACP Aditya Singh Rathore	
2003	Paanch	Murgi	
2003	Mudda - The Issue	Harpool Singh	
2003	Matrubhoomi	Raghu's Uncle	
2004	Ek Hasina Thi	Advocate Kamlesh Mathur	
2004	Lakshya	Lt. Col. Pradeep	
2004	Deewar	Eijaz	
2004	Black Friday	Badshah Khan/Nasir Khan	
2005	Dansh	Dr. John Sanga	
2006	Naalai	Adi	Tamil film
2006	Darwaaza Bandh Rakho	Inspector	
2006	Dil Se Pooch...Kidhar Jaana Hai	Avinash Srivastava	
2007	Aalwar	Inspector	Tamil film
2007	Raakh	Yusuf	
2009	Gulaal	Karan Singh	
2009	Mohandas	Advocate Harshvardhan Soni	
2010	Kaalo	Sameer	
2017	Julie 2	ACP Devdutt	
2018	Karim Mohammed	Narrator	
2019	Super 30	Lallan Singh	
2020	Raat Akeli Hai	M.L.A. Munna Raja	
2021	Haseen Dilruba	Kishore Rawat	
2023	Bheed	Inspector Ram Singh	
2024	Bhakshak	Bansi Sahu	
2024	Phir Aayi Hasseen Dillruba	A.C.P Kishore Jamwal	
2025	Trimukha	Professor. Vishnu Bhagat	Telugu
2025	Kaal Trighori	Raviraj	
2025	Hello Knock Knock Kaun Hai?	Andy	

=== Television ===
Year	Show	Role	Notes
1992–1994	Dera		
1993–1994	Shesh Prashna		
1994	Byomkesh Bakshi	Madhumoy Sur	episode: Kahen Kavi Kalidas
1995–1997	Yeh Shaadi Nahi Ho Sakti		
1998	Aahat	Warden Dev / Advocate Jayant	episodes: Barrack No. 18 - Part I, Barrack No. 18 - Part II, Guest - Part 1, Guest - Part 1, Guest - Part 2
1997–1998	9 Malabar Hill	Majid	
1997–1998	Mohandas B.A.L.L.B.	Rohit Khanna	Ep 15 - Debate
1998–1999	Rishtey	Rashid Gul and Vijay	Ep 39 - Maa
1998	Saturday Suspense	Madhavan and Varun	
1998	C.I.D.	Paresh	
1999–2018, 2024–2025	C.I.D.	Senior Inspector Abhijeet	Lead role
1999–2000	Star Bestsellers		
2004	Raat Hone Ko Hai	Pramod	
2005	CID: Special Bureau	Senior Inspector Abhijeet	
2012	Adaalat	Senior Inspector Abhijeet	
2012	CID Viruddh Adaalat	Senior Inspector Abhijeet	
2014	Taarak Mehta Ka Ooltah Chashmah	Senior Inspector Abhijeet	
2017	Peshwa Bajirao	Narrator	First episode
2019	CIF	Inspector Ashfaq Ali Khan	Lead role
2024–present	Safarkhana With Aditya & Daya	Host	Lead role
2024	IC 814: The Kandahar Hijack	V K Agarwal	
2025	The Family Man	Yashwant Kumar	Season 3
