= The Last Act (film) =

2012 film

- Directed by: Goswami Anurag; Nitin Bhardwaj; Jagannathan Krishnan; Nijo Rohit; Tathagata Singha; Nitye Sood; Himanshu Tyagi; Kabir Singh Chowdhry; Rohin Venkatesan
- Written by: Anurag Kashyap
- Produced by: Anurag Kashyap
- Starring: Saurabh Shukla
- Cinematography: Suvikram Bedi
- Edited by: Sakshi Bhatia; Sanyukta Kaza; Nitesh Rathod
- Music by: Harshwardhan Dixit
- Production company: Royal Stag Mega Movies Large Short Films
- Distributed by: PVR
- Release date: 12 December 2012
- Running time: 122 minutes
- Country: India

The Last Act is a 2012 Indian Hindi-language anthology film directed by twelve directors and written by Anurag Kashyap.

== Segments ==
The twelve segments include:

- Nitin Bhardwaj's Ghaziabad
- Tathagata Singha's Calcutta
- Anurag Goswami's Lucknow
- Himanshu Tyagi's Gwalior
- Varun Choudhury's Chandigarh
- Jagannathan Krishnan's Pune
- Nijo-Rohit's Delhi
- Tejas Joshi's Kalyan
- Nitye Sood's Bangalore

== Cast ==
- Saurabh Shukla as theatre troupe director

== Production ==
Twelve short stories were connected by Anurag Kashyap, who wrote the film's screenplay. Each of the short films are ten minutes long and take place in twelve cities. The twelve directors were chosen by Kashyap, Sudhir Mishra, and Chakri Toleti.

== Release ==
The film was screened at Mumbai on 12 December 2012. The Times of India gave the film a rating of three-and-a-half out of five stars and wrote that "With a unique concept at hand and an all-new directors’ gang, getting the ‘act together’ is no mean feat. Team of 12 – Take a bow, this stage is all yours". Firstpost wrote that "One hopes the collaborative form will find more takers in India—perhaps the next time round, the ride will be a smoother one".
