= Kaalo =

- Promotional poster
- Directed by: Wilson Louis
- Written by: Wilson Louis; Sumit Arora (Dialogues)
- Produced by: Yash Patnaik; Mamta Patnaik; Dhaval Gada
- Starring: Swini Khara; Aditya Srivastav; Kanwarjit Paintal; Sheela David; Raj Arjun; Aditya Lakhia; Abhijit Satham; Madhurima Tuli; Tripta; Hemant Pandey; Pradeep Kabra
- Cinematography: Pushpank Gawade
- Edited by: Avinash Waizade
- Music by: Rahul Ranade
- Production company: Beyond Dreams Entertainment Ltd.
- Distributed by: Beyond Dreams Entertainment
- Release date: 17 December 2010
- Running time: 85 minutes
- Country: India
- Language: Hindi
- Box office: ₹3 million

Kaalo is a 2010 Indian Hindi-language horror film, written and directed by Wilson Louis and produced by Yash Patnaik, Mamta Patnaik and Dhaval Gada.Chetram was in it film was released on 17 December 2010 under the Beyond Dreams Entertainment Ltd. banner.

== Plot ==
The film features Kaalo, a devilish witch who lived in Kulbhata during the 18th century. She was killed and buried by angry villagers after sacrificing young girl children to satisfy her greed for immortality, but her fear lived on. Years later, villagers spoke of Kaalo's sightings yet again. They claimed she was even more angry and dangerous, and she was back to finish what she left incomplete. Kulbhata was vacated overnight by scared villagers. All roads leading to Kulbhata were sealed by horrifying tales of Kaalo killing anyone who dared to enter Kulbhata until a bus carrying eleven passengers on its way to Kuldevi had to pass through Kulbhata. The passengers were a newlywed couple who were on the way to Kuldevi for blessings and an aged Brahmin couple who were going to Kuldevi to meet their granddaughter. They tried to survive till the end, but unfortunately both died. Four shameless and drunkard friends - namely Chotu, the youngest among them and the first one to die; Guddu; Chutan, who is a greedy and cowardly man; and Sushi, a overconfident man. A NRI couple, who love to give poses and then take photos of them. One of the passengers on the bus was a twelve-year-old girl named Shona, who was traveling alone to spend her vacation at her grandmother's house in the neighboring village. Shona was clever, witty, and cheerful. She soon became the life of the journey. Everyone loved her endearing manners. Especially the reclusive and reticent Sameer, who was traveling with a bag loaded with gunpowder to blast a small hillock, which would give way to a water canal for his drought-hit village. Thirsty for blood, Kaalo could smell Shona from miles away and headed straight for the bus. When the passengers suddenly realized they were staring into death, everything changed. From being the life of the journey, Shona became their very reason for dying. Everyone wanted her out of the bus; some even used her as bait to lure Kaalo away from themselves. Human relations changed as they fought for their survival. Kaalo started brutally killing the passengers. The first one to die was Chotu, then the driver, then the conductor. Kaalo killed everyone, but in the end she was killed by Sameer, along with Shona. This happened because no one except Sameer had the guts to stand up for Shona. It didn't matter to him whether Kaalo was a creature or a witch. All he knew was that he had to protect Shona at any cost because time was running out for him and his co-passengers who were still alive. At the end of the movie, Sameer blind's Kaalo by pierces two sticks in her eyes, and stabs her with her own knife. Now that Kaalo was not able to see anything, Sameer hangs the gunpowder bag on Kaalo's neck and lights the gunpowder. Kaalo explodes into pieces and goes underneath the earth. At the end of the movie, Shona and Sameer go home.

== Cast ==
- Swini Khara as Shona
- Aditya Srivastava as Sameer
- Aditya Lakhia as Raghu
- Raj Arjun as Chandan
- Abhijeet Satam as Guddu
- Tripta Parashar as Shaz (Model)
- Kanwarjit Paintal as Pandit Ram Shrivastav
- Madhurima Tuli as Rukmini
- Sheela David as Pandit's Wife
- Hemant Pandey as Bus Driver
- Satish Sharma as Hasmukh Shah
- Prashantt Gupta as Nikhil
- Manoj Tiger as Bus Conductor
- Pradeep Kabra as Kaalo

== Reception ==
Taran Adarsh of Bollywood Hungama gave the film 2 out of 5, writing, "On the whole, KAALO is an interesting watch for fans of this genre. It has decent merits, but few shortcomings too along the way. If the horror genre excites you then try this one." Sonil Dedhia of Rediff.com gave the film 2.5 out of 5, writing, "On the whole, Kaalo scares you -- but only in bits. The movie starts off very well and promises a grand finale. But once the background story is out, the movie plods along in its attempt to bring everything together. The movie will interest the audiences who love the genre, but with lack of publicity and two big releases next week, Kaalo will find it tough to survive to competition."
