= Utt Pataang =

- DVD Cover
- Directed by: Srikanth V. Velagaleti
- Screenplay by: Saurabh Shukla
- Story by: Srikanth V. Velagaleti
- Produced by: Aparna Joshi
- Starring: Vinay Pathak; Mahie Gill; Saurabh Shukla; Mona Singh; Sanjay Mishra
- Cinematography: Arun Varma
- Edited by: Sankalp Meshram
- Music by: Songs: Shamir Tandon; Background Score: Sanjoy Chowdhury
- Production company: Rash Productions
- Distributed by: Warner Bros. Pictures
- Release date: 4 February 2011
- Running time: 97 minutes
- Country: India
- Language: Hindi

Utt Pataang (transl. Nonsensical) is a 2011 Indian Hindi-language comedy drama film written and directed by Srikanth V. Velagaleti and features Vinay Pathak in a double role alongside, Mahie Gill, Mona Singh and Saurabh Shukla in the leading roles. The film was released on 4 February 2011, to mixed reviews and was also a commercial failure. It is inspired by the Japanese film, A Stranger of Mine (2005).

== Synopsis ==
Ramvilas Sharma (Vinay Pathak) has just ended his live-in relationship with his girlfriend Sanjana Mahadik (Mahie Gill). His detective friend Nandu (Saurabh Shukla) sets him up with Koel Datta (Mona Singh), who has also ended her relationship with her boyfriend after finding out that he was cheating on her.

Unknown to Ram, Sanjana is having an affair with gangster Lucky Sardana (also played by Vinay Pathak). When Sanjana realizes that Lucky is using 5 crore of his money to buy a flat for his wife, Nimmi (Delnaaz Paul), she absconds with the money.

Sanjana decides to take Nandu's help in recovering her passport from Ram's place so that she can leave the country with the money. However, Nandu decides to return the money to Lucky, as he doesn't want to have anything to do with Lucky's money. He returns the bag to Lucky not realizing that Sanjana has switched the bags and has hidden the money at Ram's place.

The remainder of the movie depicts how the money causes confusion in the lives of the characters.

== Cast ==
- Vinay Pathak as Ram Sharma / Lucky Sardana
- Mahie Gill as Sanjana Mahadik
- Saurabh Shukla as Nandu Pandey
- Mona Singh as Koel
- Sanjay Mishra as Bolu
- Brijendra Kala as Dolu
- Delnaaz Paul as Nimmi
- Govind Namdeo as Ghani Bhai (Special Appearance)
- Murli Sharma as Inspector Shinde (Special Appearance)
- Kurush Deboo as Ramvilas' Office Colleague

== Reception ==
=== Critical reception ===
Utt Pataang received mixed reviews from critics. Taran Adarsh from Bollywood Hungama gave it 3 out of 5 stars saying "It has a novel premise and what makes it even more appealing is the way the subject material has been executed". Namrata Joshi of Outlook India also gave it 3 out of 5 but said "No doubt the director wants to make the story-telling deep and complex but it gets unnervingly complicated and needlessly heavy and tedious. The dialogue is crisp and some scenes have a deadpan humour". Nikhat Kazmi from Times of India rated it 2.5/5 and said "Another fair is foul-foul is fair drama that has energetic bits and pieces amidst some mediocre stuff." She further stated "the narrative structure which might seem innovative to few but gets clunky and incoherent for the average viewer who might just lose patience trying to keep pace with the back and forth jumps." Renuka Rao from DNA India gave it 2.5/5 and said "Watch Utt Pataang not for sheer entertainment but for the way it pulls you into its story. An enjoyable film, Utt Pataang is definitely paisa vasool". Mayank Shekhar of Hindustan Times rated it 1.5/5 saying "You'd imagine someone read this script and thought the supposed page-turner would make for another low-budget comic hit. They didn't bother to apply any cinema at all".

== Soundtrack ==
The music of the film was composed by Shamir Tandon. It consists of 2 songs and 3 remixes. The music was released on Junglee Music. Lyrics were penned by Arun Kumar and Rohit Sharma.

=== Track listing ===
No.	Title	Singer(s)	Length
1.	"Jaanu Na Jaanu Na"	Shaan, Ahan Shah	4:25
2.	"Jaanu Na Jaanu Na" (Remix)	Shaan, Ahan Shah	6:03
3.	"Utt Pataang"	Tochi Raina	5:13
4.	"Utt Pataang" (Remix)	Tochi Raina	4:49
5.	"Jaanu Na Jaanu Na" (Country Version)	Shaan, Ahan Shah	4:15
