= Calcutta Mail =

- Film poster
- Directed by: Sudhir Mishra
- Written by: Gunasekhar; Sudhir Mishra; Saurabh Shukla
- Based on: Choodalani Vundi by Gunasekhar
- Produced by: C. Ashwini Dutt; Allu Aravind; Mukesh Udeshi
- Starring: Anil Kapoor; Rani Mukerji; Manisha Koirala
- Cinematography: Ravi K. Chandran; S. Kumar
- Edited by: Shirish Kunder; Renu Saluja
- Music by: Anand Raj Anand; Viju Shah
- Production company: Siri Media Arts
- Release date: 5 September 2003
- Running time: 127 minutes
- Country: India
- Language: Hindi
- Budget: ₹5.75 crore
- Box office: ₹4.34 crore

Calcutta Mail is a 2003 Indian Hindi-language action thriller film directed by Sudhir Mishra, starring Anil Kapoor, Rani Mukerji and Manisha Koirala. The film is a remake of the 1998 Telugu film Choodalani Vundi.

== Plot ==
Avinash comes to Calcutta to search for his only son, Ishu, and finds himself engulfed with too many people interested in him. His only lead is a telephone number given to him by a cop before coming to Calcutta. As soon as he lands in Calcutta, he needs a place to stay. Here, he meets Reema, aka Bulbul, a bubbly novelist who is supposed to be doing research for her novel. The room that Avinash gets is occupied by Bulbul. She refuses to vacate, so Avinash stays there too (though he sleeps outside the room). Bulbul falls in love with Avinash and becomes the light in his dark life.

There are flashbacks throughout the movie. Sanjana and Avinash once lived in Calcutta with their only child, Ishu. One day, Avinash witnessed a crime being committed and came to the assistance of the victim, taking him to the hospital. This did not augur well with his assailants, and they killed Sanjana and abducted their child. The police were involved but were unable to trace the child.

A heartbroken and desperate Avinash decides to take matters into his own hands and begins inquiring. His inquiries take him to Mumbai via the Calcutta Mail, and this is where he will find out whether his son is alive or not, or whether he has been lured into a deadly trap.

== Cast ==
- Anil Kapoor as Avinash
- Rani Mukerji as Bulbul / Reema
- Manisha Koirala as Sanjana
- Satish Kaushik as Sujan Singh
- Sayaji Shinde as Lakhan Yadav
- Saurabh Shukla as Ghatak
- Deven Verma as Reema's grandpa
- Ganesh Yadav as Lakhan's associate
- Shivaji Satam as Rana Rastogi
- Tarun Shukla
- Tara Mehta

== Soundtrack ==
The film's music was composed by Anand Raj Anand and Viju Shah, with lyrics written by Mehboob and Javed Akhtar.

#	Song title	Singer(s)	Composer	Lyricist
1	"Zindagi Hai Kya Pyar Ke Bina"	Alka Yagnik, Udit Narayan	Viju Shah	Mehboob
2	"Tum Agar Mauj Ho Koi To Kinara Hu"	Udit Narayan	Viju Shah	Javed Akhtar
3	"Kahan Pe Meri Jaan Jaogi"	Pamela Jain, Adnan Sami	Anand Raaj Anand	Mehboob
4	"Pyar Se Dekh Le Ek Nazar"	Hamsika Iyer, Sonu Nigam	Anand Raaj Anand	Mehboob
5	"Ye Saaheb Ajeeb Hai"	Sujata Trivedi	Viju Shah	Javed Akhtar
6	"Bheegi Bheegi Hawa Hai"	Shaan, Kavita Krishnamurthy	Viju Shah	Javed Akhtar
7	"Intezar Hai Tera"	Sukhwinder Singh	Viju Shah	Javed Akhtar
8	"Meri Jaan Meri Jaana"	Alka Yagnik, Nitin Raikwar	Viju Shah	Javed Akhtar
