= Madhur Mittal =

Indian actor (born 1991)

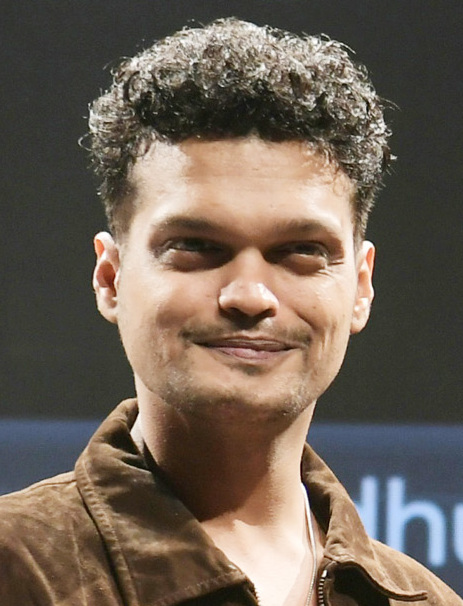
- Mittal during the promotion of Million Dollar Arm
- Born: 20 February 1991 (age 35); Agra, India
- Education: Bachelors in Advertising and Master of Acting through University of Mumbai
- Occupation: Actor
- Known for: Slumdog Millionaire
- Notable work: Slumdog Millionaire, Million Dollar Arm, 800
- Awards: Screen Actors Guild Award for Outstanding Performance by a Cast in a Motion Picture for Slumdog Millionaire

Madhur Mittal (born February 20, 1991) is an Indian actor. He is known for his character 'Tito' in the TV serial Shaka Laka Boom Boom and his performance as Salim Malik in the film Slumdog Millionaire, which won the Academy Award for Best Picture of 2008 and for which he won the Screen Actors Guild Award for Outstanding Performance by a Cast in a Motion Picture.

== Early life and career ==
Madhur was born in Agra, India.

In 1997, Madhur won Boogie Woogie a popular reality-based dance show on television. Shortly after, his family moved to Mumbai where he joined AVM High for his schooling and Madhur forayed into acting and dancing on stage in charity shows, cultural events and film-award ceremonies. He traveled the world performing in over 950 stage shows. As a child actor he worked in well known Hindi films like One Two Ka Four, Kahin Pyaar Na Ho Jaaye, and more recently Say Salaam India. He has also acted in several TV shows including Shaka Laka Boom Boom, Kasauti Zindagi Ki, Jalwa, Chamatkar, Prithviraj Chauhan and Dastak.

Madhur Mittal's role in Slumdog Millionaire has helped him to gain worldwide attention. To prepare himself for the role of Salim in Slumdog Millionaire after being cast he hung out with some of the ‘gangsters’ in Mira Road "to get into their heads". Director Danny Boyle gave him a series of the Godfather to watch as that had a crazy brother in it. Also, he had an accident which led him getting 12 stitches which helped with the rough look, he said. He had to grow his hair long, increase his skin tan and lose weight to act as Salim.

In 2008 he was nominated for the Black Reel Awards of 2008 for Best Ensemble and in 2009, along with the entire cast of Slumdog Millionaire he won the Screen Actors Guild Award for Outstanding Performance by a Cast in a Motion Picture at the 15th Screen Actors Guild Awards. He was also set to be present for the 66th Golden Globe Awards and the 15th Screen Actors Guild Awards.

Mittal plays Anwar Razdan in the second series of Kidnap and Ransom which aired on ITV1 from 23 February 2012.

Most recently, he starred in the Disney film Million Dollar Arm as Dinesh Patel and received good reviews for his performance as the villain in Maatr (2017).

Mittal, in the year 2020, did a web series named High on the OTT platform MX Player and gained some good reviews for that role.

== Awards and honours ==
Won

- 2009: Screen Actors Guild Award for Outstanding Performance by a Cast in a Motion Picture for Slumdog Millionaire
- 2023:Best Debut Actor in Ananda Vikatan Awards for 2023 Tamil movies for 800

Nominated

- 2008: Black Reel Awards of 2008 - Best Ensemble for Slumdog Millionaire

== Filmography ==
Key
†	Denotes films that have not yet been released

Year	Title	Role	Language	Notes
2000	Kahin Pyaar Na Ho Jaaye	Michael	Hindi	
2001	One 2 Ka 4	Micheal Abbas	Hindi	
2007	Say Salaam India	Shakeel	Hindi	
2008	Slumdog Millionaire	Salim	English	
2014	Million Dollar Arm	Dinesh Patel	English; Hindi	
2015	Pocket Gangsters	Vicky Ranawat	Hindi	
2017	Maatr	Apurva Malik	Hindi	
2023	800	Muttiah Muralitharan	Tamil	
2024	Maidaan	Fortunato Franco	Hindi	

=== Web series ===
Year	Title	Role	Notes
2020	High	Jimmy	On MX Player
2021	Matsya Kaand	Raju/Rajeshwar Singh	On MX Player
2025	Chidiya Udd	Babu Rao	On MX Player

=== Television ===
Year	Title	Role	Notes
1992	Chamatkar		
1996	Dastak		
1997	Boogie Woogie	himself	Winner of Boogie Woogie
2001	Kasauti Zindagi Ki		
2002	Shaka Laka Boom Boom	Tito	
2012	Kidnap and Ransom Series 2	Anwar Razdan	
2012	Treasure Island	Dick Johnson	
