= Kya Dilli Kya Lahore =

- Directed by: Vijay Raaz
- Screenplay by: Aseem Arora; Pratham S. Jolly; Manu Rishi
- Story by: Aseem Arora
- Produced by: Karan Arora
- Starring: Vijay Raaz; Manu Rishi; Raj Zutshi
- Cinematography: Raaj Chakravarthy
- Edited by: Archit D. Rastogi
- Music by: Sandesh Shandilya
- Production company: Picture Thoughts Production
- Distributed by: Wave Cinemas
- Release date: 2 May 2014
- Running time: 100 minutes
- Country: India
- Language: Hindi

Kya Dilli Kya Lahore (transl. What Delhi, what Lahore?) is a 2014 Indian Hindi-language war film set in 1948, post India's independence, and deals with the Partition of India. The film stars Vijay Raaz, Manu Rishi, Raj Zutshi and Vishwajeet Pradhan, with Gulzar credited as the presenter. Produced by Karan Arora, it marks the directorial debut of Raaz. The first look of the film was released at the Wagah border. It was released worldwide on 2 May 2014 to positive response from critics.

== Plot ==
In 1948, during post-partition settlements, a lone Army outpost in a kind of no man's land was identified, wherein some files were kept. Both Indian and Pakistani armies sent a soldier to lay claim over it, not knowing that the other party had done the same. The Indian soldier is originally from Lahore, while the Pakistani soldier is from Delhi, having migrated during partition and having scars of the event deep in their hearts. An ironic story of pride and survival begins when, in an attempt to evade danger, they bump into each other. And amidst the continuous exchange of bullets, altercations, and murkier situations, it evolves into a journey of human connection with an unforeseeable end.

== Cast ==
- Vijay Raaz – Rehmat Ali
- Manu Rishi – Samarth Pratap Shastri
- Raj Zutshi – Barfi Singh
- Vishwajeet Pradhan – Pakistani captain

== First look ==
"Lakeerein hain to rehne do,
kisi ne rooth kar gusse mein shayad kheech di thi.
Unhi ko ab banao paala aur aao kabaddi khelte hain.
Lakeerein hain to rehne do."—Gulzar

The first look of Kya Dilli Kya Lahore was unveiled at Wagah border (Punjab) with a symbolic colourful flag lowering ceremony. The star cast held a candlelight vigil on 14 August 2012. Giant posters of the movie were set up where hundreds flocked to watch the ceremony. The first look was very impressive and Gulzar's shayari had touched people's hearts.

== Staff reaction ==
Raaz says that "It is a very emotional film" for him and that "It is a very innocent story." "The film comes with the message that humanity is bigger than any religion or any country and that's what we have tried to convey..."

About his involvement, Gulzar sahib says that "This subject (partition) is very close" to his heart and he has been "writing about it a lot." He further adds, "After seeing the film, I was surprised to know that many youngsters have been associated with the film and yet they have brought the essence of the whole film so well. Karan had brought the script to me and after they completed the film, he brought it to show it to me. The film was bang on. The film talks about peace yet is not preachy and there is no blood shed, it is a human drama and very relevant."

Producer Karan Arora added that this "is not like a typical Bollywood extravaganza, it is a simple film." He is "not worried about the commercial viability" of Kya Dilli Kya Lahore and is content to know that he made "an honest film."

== Production ==
Vijay Raaz says that he "was thinking about direction when the story came to me. We have grown up on Partition stories, so I was naturally attracted to the film. It is a simple story but at the same time it is very difficult."

The writers Aseem Arora, Pratham Jolly and Manu Rishi won Best Screenplay award at the prestigious 5th Dadasaheb Phalke Film Festival.

It got rave reviews and appreciation from critics. Mumbai Mirror, NDTV and The Times of India gave Kya Dilli Kya Lahore three stars while Divya Sologoma gave it four stars praising the content's purity and mentor Gulzar's poetry.

== See also ==
- No Man's Land
