= Hari Puttar: A Comedy of Terrors =

Hari Puttar
- Directed by: Lucky Kohli & Rajesh Bajaj
- Produced by: A.P. Parigi
- Starring: Sarika; Zain Khan; Swini Khara; Jackie Shroff; Saurabh Shukla; Vijay Raaz
- Music by: Aadesh Shrivastav; Guru Sharma
- Distributed by: Mirchi Movies
- Release date: 26 September 2008
- Running time: 86 minutes
- Country: India
- Language: Hindi

Hari Puttar is a 2008 Indian comedy film directed by Lucky Kohli & Rajesh Bajaj. The film features Sarika, Zain Khan, Swini Khara, Saurabh Shukla, Vijay Raaz, Jackie Shroff and Lilette Dubey. It was released on 26 September 2008. The plot of the film is similar to the 1990 film Home Alone.

== Plot ==
The film revolves around a ten-year-old boy, Hari Prasad Dhoonda (nicknamed Hari Puttar), who has recently moved from India to the United Kingdom. Left home alone with his cousin Tuk Tuk when his parents go on vacation, Hari must deal with two burglars who hope to steal a secret formula Hari's father had created.

== Cast ==
- Sarika as Sangeeta
- Zain Khan as Hari Prasad Dhoonda aka Hari Puttar
- Swini Khara as Tuk Tuk
- Jackie Shroff as DK
- Saurabh Shukla as Diesel
- Vijay Raaz as Filter
- Lilette Dubey as Santosh
- Shamita Shetty (special appearance in the song "Tutari Baje")

== Soundtrack ==
The soundtrack for Hari Puttar features songs composed by Aadesh Shrivastav with lyrics by Sameer:

- "Hari Puttar" – Shaan, Aadesh Shrivastava & Neha Bhasin
- "Tutari" – Sukhwinder Singh & Sunidhi Chauhan
- "Bhai Ae Gaya" – Akriti Kakkar & Vicky Chandra
- "Meri Yaadon Mein Hai Tu" – Shreya Ghoshal
- "Hari Hari Puttar Hai" – Hamza Faruqui, Zain Khan & Sonia
- "Hari Puttar is a Dude" – Aishwarya Majmudar & Sameer

== Reception ==
Insiyah Vahanvaty of Rediff.com gave the film three out of five, writing, "Despite a few let-downs, the film is engaging and funny, keeping the children at the theatre in splits at the bumbling goondas. Do take your kids for the fun ride!"

Conversely, Shubhra Gupta of The Indian Express gave a negative review, calling the script of the film a "script which doesn’t know the meaning of sense." Taran Adarsh of Bollywood Hungama gave the film one out of five, writing, "Zain Khan does a decent job. Swini Khara, seen in CHEENI KUM, gets no scope. Sarika looks disinterested. Also, she looks ill at ease delivering Punjabi lines. Lilette Dubey is miscast. As for Jackie Shroff, the less said the better. It's also sad to see actors like Saurabh Shukla and Vijay Raaz being reduced to such roles. They ham! On the whole, HARI PUTTAR – A COMEDY OF TERRORS is a poor show all the way."

== Controversy ==
Warner Bros. filed a lawsuit against production company Mirchi Movies to stop the release of the film due to the similarity of its title to that of the Harry Potter series. Delhi High Court threw out the case on the basis that the public would be able to differentiate between the two titles, and that Warner had chosen to wait three years until the film's release to file their case.

Mirchi Movies CEO Munish Purii has insisted that there is very little similarity between Hari Puttar and any elements in the Harry Potter franchise, and explained that Hari is a popular Indian name, while "puttar" means "son" in the Punjabi language.
