= Run (2004 film) =

2004 Indian film directed by Jeeva

- Theatrical release poster
- Directed by: Jeeva
- Screenplay by: N. Linguswamy
- Dialogues by: Kamlesh Pandey
- Story by: N. Linguswamy
- Based on: Run by N. Linguswamy
- Produced by: Surinder Kapoor (presenter); Boney Kapoor; Sridevi
- Starring: Abhishek Bachchan; Bhumika Chawla; Ayesha Jhulka; Vijay Raaz; Mukesh Rishi; Mahesh Manjrekar
- Cinematography: Jeeva
- Edited by: Sanjay Verma
- Music by: Songs: Himesh Reshammiya; Naresh Sharma; Score: Naresh Sharma
- Production company: BSK Film Network
- Distributed by: Sridevi Productions
- Release date: 2004
- Running time: 137 minutes
- Country: India
- Language: Hindi

Run is a 2004 Indian Hindi-language romantic action comedy film directed by Jeeva. The film stars Abhishek Bachchan and Bhumika Chawla. It is a remake of a 2002 Tamil film of the same name for which Jeeva worked as a cinematographer. The film was produced by Boney Kapoor and Sridevi under the banner Sridevi Productions.

== Plot ==
Siddharth alias "Sidhu" comes to New Delhi for his further studies and stays with his sister Esha from Allahabad. His spoiled friend Ganesh trails behind him and arrives later. Sidhu, through perceived destiny and chance, bumps into Janhvi and falls in love with her. Janhvi belongs to a conservative Haryanvi family where her elder brother, Ganpat, is the head and is very protective of his family, mainly his sister, after the loss of their parents.

Initially, Janhvi brushes off Sidhu's constant attempts to be with her in order to keep him safe from Ganpat. An encounter with the goons and Sidhu leads Janhvi to encourage Sidhu to run, but he instead rises to the challenge and fights off all the thugs. While Ganpat goes to threaten Esha and her husband, Sidhu threatens him back viciously as he was one step ahead of him and planned to retaliate (though falsely) by killing Ganpat's family, excluding Janhvi.

Sidhu and Janhvi keep meeting with each other, hiding and running from Janhvi's brother and his men, while Sidhu fights off any thugs that follow him and threaten to hurt him or his family. Eventually, Ganpat decides to use his thugs to beat up a boy who was giving Sidhu a hard time in school, thus giving the impression to the principal of the school that Sidhu is a thug. Sidhu is suspended in return. Then, they hit Esha with a van and frame her husband for him to lose his job all at the same time, while Sidhu and Janhvi agree they should elope and be married before she is married off.

Meanwhile, Ganesh is constantly tricked and goes through various harsh realities about life. In the end, Ganesh loses all his money, his watch, his clothes, his hope to meet his friend Sidhu, and a kidney. All his experiences end in making Ganesh accidentally a "Pettycoat Baba", a saint who is believed by the people (not by Ganesh) to be living in the Himalayas for 250 years.

In the climax, Sidhu hatches a plan to bait Ganpat and his men to the wrong area and marry Janhvi in the presence of her remaining family members, who care for her and Sidhu, until Ganpat gets wind of this and tracks them down. The newlyweds now have to run from a mass of thugs. This leads to a final battle, which ends with a one-on-one fight with Sidhu and Ganpat. Sidhu wins and refuses to deal with the death blow, allowing him to live. Ganpat allows Janhvi and Sidhu to leave, finally accepting him as his brother-in-law. Sidhu and Janhvi leave and get married.

== Cast ==
- Abhishek Bachchan as Siddharth Verma alias "Sidhu"
- Bhumika Chawla as Jahnvi Choudhry
- Ayesha Jhulka as Esha Verma (Sidhu's sister)
- Vijay Raaz as Ganesh Yadav, Siddharth’s friend
- Mukesh Rishi as Rajeev Kant, Sidhu’s brother-in-law
- Mahesh Manjrekar as Ganpat Choudhry, Janhvi’s brother
- Shweta Menon as Shreya Choudhry, Ganpat's wife
- Aanjjan Srivastav as Mr. Yadav, Ganesh's father
- Goga Kapoor as Ganpat's uncle
- Pankaj Tripathi as Unknown Man
- Shafi in a guest appearance

== Soundtrack ==
Run

Soundtrack album by Himesh Reshammiya
- Released: 14 May 2004 (India)
- Recorded: 2004
- Venue: Mumbai
- Genre: Feature film soundtrack
- Length: 43:25
- Producer: Himesh Reshammiya

Himesh Reshammiya chronology
| Bardaasht (2004) | Run (2004) | Julie (2004) |

The music of the film was composed by Himesh Reshammiya, with lyrics penned by Sameer.

| # | Title | Singer(s) |
|---|---|---|
| 1. | "Dil Mein Jo Baat" | Sonu Nigam, Alka Yagnik |
| 2. | "Chain Ho Chain Ho" | Sonu Nigam, Alka Yagnik |
| 3. | "Sarki Chunariya Re Zara Zara" | Udit Narayan, Alka Yagnik |
| 4. | "Nahi Hona Nahi Hona" | Kunal Ganjawala, Richa Sharma |
| 5. | "Tere Aane Se" | Kumar Sanu, Alka Yagnik |
| 6. | "Bade Hi Naazuk Daur Se" | Kumar Sanu, Alka Yagnik |
| 7. | "Tere Mere Pyaar Ke Chand" | Alka Yagnik |
| 8. | "Tere Aane Se" (Remix) | Alka Yagnik, Kumar Sanu |

== Reception ==
Taran Adarsh of IndiaFM gave the film one out of five, writing, "On the whole, RUN is too weak a fare to leave any impact whatsoever." Kaveree Bamzai of India Today wrote, "For some reason Mumbai filmmakers, living in their plush, Lalique-studded Juhu bungalows, assume that small-town Indians love to see themselves ridiculed onscreen. That is the only reason why Boney Kapoor would produce a film like Run, ostensibly an action movie aimed at what is known in Bollyspeak as B-class towns. Clearly, Kapoor has not heard of the rampant glocalisation of India that economic liberalisation and satellite television have wrought."
