= Mere Yaar Ki Shaadi Hai =

2002 Indian film by Sanjay Gadhvi

- Theatrical release poster
- Directed by: Sanjay Gadhvi
- Written by: Sanjay Gadhvi; Mayur Puri
- Produced by: Yash Chopra
- Starring: Uday Chopra; Jimmy Shergill; Tulip Joshi; Bipasha Basu
- Cinematography: Sunil Patel
- Edited by: V. Karnik; Ritesh Soni
- Music by: Jeet–Pritam
- Production company: Yash Raj Films
- Distributed by: Yash Raj Films
- Release date: 7 June 2002
- Running time: 159 minutes
- Country: India
- Language: Hindi
- Budget: ₹5.75 crore
- Box office: ₹16.54 crore

Mere Yaar Ki Shaadi Hai (transl. It's My Friend's Wedding) is a 2002 Indian Hindi-language romantic comedy film directed by Sanjay Gadhvi and produced by Yash Chopra under the banner of Yash Raj Films. The film stars Uday Chopra, Jimmy Shergill, Tulip Joshi, and Bipasha Basu. It is partially inspired by My Best Friend's Wedding (1997).

The film was released on 7 June 2002 and received mixed reviews from critics, emerging as a moderate success at the box-office.

== Plot ==
Sanjay Malhotra lives in Mumbai with his friend Riya. One day, he receives a call from his childhood friend Anjali Sharma, who informs him that she is getting married. Sanjay, who has secretly loved Anjali for years, travels to her home intending to stop the wedding.

There, he meets Anjali’s fiancé, Rohit Khanna. Because of Sanjay’s reputation as a flirt and his carefree behaviour, Anjali’s family do not take his concerns seriously. Determined to prevent the marriage, Sanjay begins plotting ways to disrupt the wedding preparations. He organises a bachelor party for Rohit and the men in the family, during which Rohit becomes intoxicated and realises that Sanjay intends to stop the wedding. Rohit challenges Sanjay, vowing that he will not succeed.

Sanjay and Riya then attempt to make Anjali jealous in the hope that she will recognise her feelings for Sanjay. During Anjali’s mehendi ceremony, Riya tells Anjali that she and Sanjay were never romantically involved. Anjali confesses that she has loved Sanjay for years, but believed that he saw her only as a close friend. Rohit later learns of Anjali’s feelings and is heartbroken.

Realising that Anjali truly loves Sanjay, Rohit informs his mother that Sanjay has always been the person Anjali wanted to marry. On the day of the wedding, Anjali leaves for Mumbai to find Sanjay. When she confronts him, Sanjay finally admits that he loves her and cannot bear to see her marry someone else. The two reconcile and confess their feelings for each other.

Although Rohit loses his challenge with Sanjay, he accepts their relationship and supports them. Sanjay and Anjali marry, while Rohit and Riya celebrate at their wedding.

== Cast ==
- Uday Chopra as Sanjay "Sanju" Malhotra
- Jimmy Shergill as Rohit Khanna
- Tulip Joshi as Anjali Sharma
- Bipasha Basu as Ria, Sanjay's friend
- Tanaaz Irani as Anushka Sharma, Anjali's sister
- Alok Nath as Vishnu Sharma, Anjali's father
- Neena Kulkarni as Gayatri Sharma, Anjali's mother
- Deven Verma as Hari Taya, Anjali's uncle
- Bindu as Kapila Tai, Anjali's aunt
- Saurabh Shukla as Kunal Sharma, Anjali's uncle
- Raja Vaid as Rajesh, Anushka's husband
- Parikshat Sahni as Rohan Khanna, Rohit's father
- Dina Pathak as Anjali's aunt
- Mehul Buch as Ajit Sharma, Anjali's brother
- Sheela Sharma as Gita, Ajit's wife
- Resham Tipnis as Neelima Agarwal, Anjali's cousin
- Tushar Dalvi as Naren, Neelima's husband
- Shamita Shetty as a dancer in the song "Sharara (special appearance)

== Soundtrack ==
Mere Yaar Ki Shaadi Hai

Soundtrack album by Jeet-Pritam
- Released: 9 May 2002
- Genre: Feature Film soundtrack
- Length: 27:34
- Labels: YRF Music (digital); Saregama (physical)
- Producer: Yash Chopra

Jeet-Pritam chronology
Tere Liye (2001)	Mere Yaar Ki Shaadi Hai (2002)	Mudda - The Issue (2003)

The film's music was composed by the duo Jeet–Pritam, with lyrics written by Javed Akhtar. According to the Indian trade website Box Office India, with around 11,00,000 units sold, this film's soundtrack album was the year's twelfth highest-selling. The first single track "Mere Yaar Ki Shaadi Hai" sung by Alka Yagnik, Sonu Nigam, and Udit Narayan was released on 25 April 2002. The soundtrack album was released by Yash Raj Films on 7 June 2002.

No.	Title	Artist	Length
1.	"Ek Ladki"	Udit Narayan & Alka Yagnik	05:37
2.	"Humne Suna Hai"	Udit Narayan, Alka Yagnik, Sudesh Bhonsle & Jaspinder Narula	05:01
3.	"Sharara"	Sonu Nigam & Asha Bhosle	04:56
4.	"Jaage Jaage (Resham Si Hai Yeh)"	Sonu Nigam, Alka Yagnik & Udit Narayan	05:38
5.	"Hum Dono Jaise Kaun Yahan"	KK & Sunidhi Chauhan	05:41
6.	"Mere Yaar Ki Shaadi Hai"	Udit Narayan, Sonu Nigam & Alka Yagnik	05:41
7.	"Mere Yaar Ki Shaadi Hai (Version 2)"	Sonu Nigam & Shweta Pandit	01:19

== Reception ==
Taran Adarsh of IndiaFM gave the film two stars out of five, writing, "On the whole, Mere Yaar Ki Shaadi Hai is a decent entertainer that should appeal more to the city audience". Sukanya Verma of Rediff.com wrote, "Mere Yaar Ki Shaadi Hai is good, lighthearted, clean entertainment. It might just prove a welcome break from the two films on Shaheed Bhagat Singh releasing the same day. Derek Elley of Variety wrote, "At every level (casting, budget, songs, production values), pic is one notch down from a Chopra super-production, but it still makes a fine entry-level Bollywood pic. And anyone who thinks “Monsoon Wedding” was actually representative of contemporary Bollywood should just take a look at the real thing here. Manish Gajjar of BBC.com wrote, "My advice is that you take heed of Yash Chopra's offer because this invitation is definitely not going to disappoint when it releases at UCI Telford with English subtitles".
