= Mudda – The Issue =

Mudda - The Issue
- Directed by: Saurabh Shukla
- Story by: Saurabh Shukla
- Produced by: Raju Mavani
- Starring: Arya Babbar; Prashant Narayanan; Aditya Srivastava; Rajat Kapoor; Dolly Ahluwalia; Rekha Vedavyas
- Cinematography: Taposh Mandal
- Edited by: K Ravi Kumar
- Music by: Jeet-Pritam
- Production company: Ramnord Research Laboratories Pvt Ltd
- Release date: 12 December 2003
- Country: India
- Language: Hindi

Mudda – The Issue is a 2003 Indian Hindi-language drama film directed by Saurabh Shukla and produced by Raju Mavani. The film stars Arya Babbar, Prashant Narayanan, Aditya Srivastava, Rajat Kapoor, Dolly Ahluwalia and Rekha Vedavyas.

== Plot ==
Perplexed and frustrated with life in Mumbai's corrupt colleges, Lecturer Siddharth Archarya decides to relocate to a small town called Samaypur, where he feels he will get some satisfaction in teaching youngsters who are not influenced by politics. Alas, he is wrong. Student union rivalry and hatred have encompassed the entire town; fights break out frequently, mostly between two rival student leaders, Pratap and Rajbir, who are children of local political leaders, Harphool Singh and MLA Balli Tai. Siddharth decides to garner their energy positively by making them renovate the college building - with disastrous results - and no hopes for a reconciliation. Things get even more complicated when both young men fall for a colleague, Sundari, who wants to marry Pratap. It is then that the parents of both Rajbir and Pratap meet secretly and decide what their sons' and Samaypur's fate is going to be.

== Cast ==
- Arya Babbar as Rajbir
- Prashant Narayanan as Pratap Singh
- Aditya Srivastava as Harphool Singh
- Rajat Kapoor as Siddharth Acharya
- Dolly Ahluwalia as MLA Balli Tai
- Rekha Vedavyas as Sundari
- Pankaj Jha
- Nawazuddin Siddiqui
- Saurabh Shukla as Dinanath (guest appearance)
- Vijay Raaz as Lemur (guest appearance)

== Music ==
Mudda - The Issue

Soundtrack album by Jeet-Pritam
- Released: September 12, 2003
- Genre: filmi
- Length: 39:46
- Label: Zee Music Company
- Producer: Jeet-Pritam

Jeet-Pritam chronology
Mere Yaar Ki Shaadi Hai (2002)	Mudda - The Issue (2003)

The music of the film is composed by Jeet Gannguli and Pritam while the lyrics are written by Chandrani Gannguli, Saurabh Shukla and Sanjay Swami.

All music is composed by Jeet-Pritam.

No.	Title	Lyrics	Singer(s)	Length
1.	"Khwabon Ki (male version)"	Saurabh Shukla	Hariharan	5:26
2.	"Khwabon Ki (female version)"	Saurabh Shukla	Kavita Krishnamurthy	5:27
3.	"Kaise Main Kahoon"	Sanjay Swami	Sumeet Kumar	6:17
4.	"Deewangee"	Chandrani Gannguli	Sumeet Kumar	6:06
5.	"Kutta Kaate"	Saurabh Shukla	Sonu Nigam, Saurabh Shukla	4:02
6.	"Godanva"	Saurabh Shukla	Arun Bakshi, Poornima	5:29
7.	"Sapne Saare"	Saurabh Shukla	Zubeen Garg	4:13
8.	"Deewangee" (Sad Version)	Chandrani Gannguli	Sumeet Kumar	2:46
Total length:				39:46

== Reception ==
Taran Adarsh of IndiaFM gave the film 1 1/2 stars out of 5, writing, "Director Saurabh Shukla is a fairly good story teller, but he seems to have got confused midway, whether to make a realistic film or a love triangle, with songs aplenty. On the technical side, the cinematography is just about okay. Dialogues are well penned at places, especially the ones delivered by the two warring politicians". Subhash K. Jha of The Times of India wrote that "Though Mudda finally fails to have its say cogently there are sparks here to indicate a watchable directorial debut".
