= Swini Khara =

Indian actress

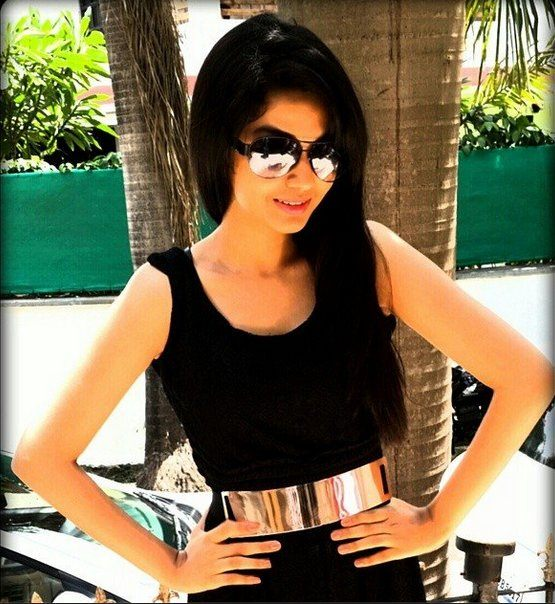
- Born: 12 July 1998 (age 27); Mumbai, Maharashtra, India
- Education: Ryan International School
- Alma mater: NM College, Mumbai (B.Com); NALSAR University of Law, Hyderabad (BA LLB)
- Occupations: Actress (formerly); lawyer
- Years active: 2005–2016
- Spouse: Urvish Desai (m. 2023)

Swini Nimesh Khara (born 12 July 1998) is an Indian former actress and a lawyer. She is known for her role as the mischievous Chaitali in the TV show Baa Bahoo Aur Baby and for a role in the 2007 film Cheeni Kum. She announced her engagement with Urvish Desai to her fans through her Instagram account.

== Filmography ==
=== Films ===
- 2005 – Parineeta
- 2005 – Elaan as Ayesha
- 2006 – Chingaari
- 2007 – Cheeni Kum as Sexy
- 2008 – Hari Puttar as Tuk Tuk
- 2010 – Pangaa Gang as Rinki (voice)
- 2010 – Paathshala as Swini
- 2010 – Kaalo - The Desert Witch as Shona
- 2012 – Delhi Safari as Yuvraj (voice)
- 2016 – M.S. Dhoni: The Untold Story as young Jayanti

=== Television ===
- 2005–2010 - Baa Bahoo Aur Baby as Chaitali Thakkar
- 2006–2007 - Dharti Ka Veer Yodha Prithviraj Chauhan as Rajkumari Pratha
- 2007–2009 - Dill Mill Gayye as Minnie
- 2011 – CID as Shweta
- 2015 – Zindagi Khatti Meethi as Tara

== Awards and nominations ==
Year	Award	Category	Film/series	Result
2007	Indian Television Academy Awards	Best Child Artist	Baa Bahoo Aur Baby	Won
