= Kaal Trighori =

2025 Indian film directed by Nitin N. Vaidya

- Theatrical release poster
- Directed by: Nitin N. Vaidya
- Written by: Nitin N. Vaidya
- Produced by: Nitin Ghataliya; Shirish Vaidya; Mansukh Talsaniya
- Starring: Arbaaz Khan; Rituparna Sengupta; Aditya Srivastava; Mahesh Manjrekar
- Cinematography: Kush Chhabria
- Edited by: Nitin N. Vaidya
- Music by: Jitesh Panchal; Amar Mohile
- Production company: Navin Productions LLP
- Distributed by: Pen Studios
- Release date: 14 November 2025
- Running time: 159 minutes
- Country: India
- Language: Hindi

Kaal Trighori (translated as The Three Nights of Doom) is a 2025 Indian Hindi-language supernatural horror thriller film written and directed by Nitin N. Vaidya in his directorial debut. Produced by Navin Productions LLP, it stars Arbaaz Khan, Rituparna Sengupta, Aditya Srivastava, and Mahesh Manjrekar. The film revolves around a rare celestial event occurring once every 100 years that awakens a destructive supernatural force in a secluded mansion.

== Premise ==
During a rare lunar month known as "Kaal Trighori" which occurs once every century, three perilous nights align, unleashing a malevolent force called Trighori. In an isolated haveli, Raviraj (Aditya Srivastava), his wife Madhuri (Rituparna Sengupta), and family friend Dr. Manoj (Arbaaz Khan) confront strange occurrences, ancient rituals, and a voodoo doll as they question whether the events are the result of a cosmic curse or human deception.

== Cast ==
- Arbaaz Khan as Dr. Manoj
- Rituparna Sengupta as Madhuri
- Aditya Srivastava as Raviraj
- Mahesh Manjrekar as Inspector Manjrekar
- Rajesh Sharma as Prof. Agnivesh Chakravati
- Mugdha Godse

== Production ==
Kaal Trighori marks the feature directorial debut of Nitin N. Vaidya, who also wrote the screenplay. The story is inspired by a real celestial alignment in April 2022 and Indian folklore surrounding rare lunar conjunctions.

== Release ==
The official trailer was released on 6 November 2025. The film was theatrically released across India on 14 November 2025 with a UA certification from the Central Board of Film Certification.

== Reception ==
Amit Bhatia of ABP News rated it 3.5/5 stars and said that "Kaal Trighori stands out as a memorable and well-crafted horror film—dark, intense, and thought-provoking. If you’re in the mood for a gripping horror-psychological thriller." Archika Khurana of The Times of India gave 2.5 stars and said that "For fans of myth-driven horror, the film offers intermittent chills — even if it never quite becomes the genre-breaker it aims to be." Ganesh Aaglave of Firstpost awarded 3 stars out of 5 and stated that "It can be said that Kaal Trighori even stands up to Hollywood-level horror films — though the faint-hearted should beware!"

Bhawna Arya of Times Now rated it 2/5 stars and described it as "Kaal Trighori is an ambitious and polished supernatural thriller that successfully merges mythology, suspense, and psychological horror. With a compelling plot, strong performances, and an immersive atmosphere, the film only falls short when it comes to its predictable plot."
