= Pocket Gangsters =

- Pocket Gangsters poster
- Hindi: पॉकेट गैंगस्टर्स
- Directed by: Hemant Nilim Das
- Written by: Hemant Nilim Das
- Screenplay by: Hemant Nilim Das
- Story by: Hemant Nilim Das
- Produced by: Vikram M. Shah
- Starring: Madhur Mittal; Raghubir Yadav; Vijay Raaz; Mukesh Bhatt; Monalisa; Shivangi Mehra; Hemant Nilim Da
- Cinematography: Sanjiv Singh
- Edited by: Sunil Yadav
- Music by: Anupam - Manuj; Lucky-Navi; Lyrics: Hemant Nilim Das; Ankitvijay Mishra; Score: Anupam - Manuj
- Production company: Ciemme Entertainment
- Release date: 3 January 2015 (India)
- Running time: 110 minutes
- Country: India
- Language: Hindi

Pocket Gangsters (Hindi: पॉकेट गैंगस्टर्स) is a 2015 Indian Hindi language comedy drama film written and directed by Hemant Nilim Das, produced by V. M. Shah, and starring Madhur Mittal, Raghubir Yadav, and Mukesh Bhatt. Though initially announced to release in July 2013 and then re-slated for September 2014, the film was finally released January 2015.

== Synopsis ==
Pocket Gangsters is the story of the world of crime where some criminals have set their goals on kidnapping and making hostage demand ransoms from the relatives or friends of those taken. What begins as drama becomes a comic thriller when they turn their criminal attention toward the daughter of a wealthy man in order to gain millions.

== Cast ==
- Madhur Mittal as Vicky Ranawat
- Raghubir Yadav as Papa
- Mukesh Bhatt as Billoo Download
- Shivangi Mehra as Mira
- Vijay Raaz as Madhubali
- Malabyaborthakur & Prashantt as Malabyabor Thakur

== Production ==
=== Inspiration ===
Kidnapping has become an illicit world-wide business netting 150 billion dollars per year. This film addresses the issue in a darkly comedic fashion. Pocket Gangsters addresses the dark world of "pocketing" human lives, IE: putting a victim's life in grave peril and demanding an obscene amount of ransom from the relatives or friends of the hostage. In the film, a young woman whose family is worth millions, is kidnapped. Director Hemant Nilim Das related that the film "is loosely based on the story of the kidnapping and murder of an NGO-activist Sanjay Ghose" as "a hostage drama cum comic thriller," and inspired by events centered in Guwahati, an area which has become "the epicentre of child-kidnapping".

=== Filming ===
In May 2013, the film was reported to have entered production. Playback singer Shalmali Kholgade, known for her multiple awards for Ishaqzaade's "Pareshaan" sang for the "Janiyaa jaaniyaa" track for this film. Actor Raghubir Yadav held the role of a blind gangster and memorized the entire 127 page Pocket Gangsters script in 4 hours in preparation for his role, as well as having spent time studying students at a school for the blind to educate himself for portraying a blind character. An issue that affected the project was actor Vijay Raaz being injured while shooting a combat scene with Madhur Mittal. Being a one-take film, he continued. After completing the scene, he was taken to a clinic and treated for a "minor injury with swellings". The project also dealt with freezing weather. One morning when shooting a swimming pool sequence at Guwahati, the temperature was as low as -4 °C.

=== Controversy ===
An incident creating controversy was the leaked releasing of a raw and unedited kidnapping and rape scene from the film. This angered the director and resulted in his sending a legal notice to news and content website IndyanNewz.com for their unauthorized leaking of the film's proprietary property. That leak resulted in a controversy questioning the rape scene being used for the film's promotion.

== Release ==
The film was initially announced with a slated release date in July 2013, and subsequently re-slated for a release for September 2014, but due to delays in post-production, release was postponed until finally being released in January 2015. Being noted as "India's first one-take, one-shot and uncut film", the finished film released January 2015 in over 900 theatre screens across India.

== Awards ==
- Best director of the feature film by Los Angeles World International Film Festival: Hemant Nilim Das
- Best audience choice award by Bioscope Global Film Festival: Vikam m. Shah
- Best lead actor (male) nominee by Bare Bones Film & Music Festival: Madhur Mittal
- Best lead actor (female) nominee by Bare Bones Film & Music Festival: Shivangi Mehra
- Semi finalist of Los Angeles CineFest: Pocket Gangsters
- Best foreign language feature by Bare Bones Film & Music Festival: Pocket Gangsters
- Bone head of excellence award by Bare Bones Film & Music Festival:Hemant Nilim Das
- Bone head of excellence award by Bare Bones Film & Music Festival:Vikram M. Shah
- Selection for feature film of 2017 by Under Ground Room: Pocket Gangsters
- Official selection in Independent Film Collaborative 2017: Pocket Gangsters
- Winner of 2nd Cinema London Film Festival 2017: Pocket Gangsters
- Malta international film festival award: Pocket Gangsters
- Winner of Intl. Film Festival for Women, Social Issues & Zero Discrimination 2017: Pocket Gangsters
- Gold Award for best feature film by International Film Festival: Pocket Gangsters
- Selected in Cameroon Intl. Film Festival 2017: Pocket Gangsters
- Selected in AMAZON Underground Film Festival 2017: Pocket Gangsters
- Pre-selected in ROME Film Awards 2017: Pocket Gangsters
- Selection in Direct Monthly Online Film Festival 2016: Pocket Gangsters
- Winner of Los Angeles World Intl. Film Festival 2016 Pocket Gangsters
- Selection in Eurocinema Film Festival 2016: Pocket Gangsters
- Best director by Los Angeles World International Film Festival: Hemant Nilim Das
- Selection in Kashmir Intl. Film Festival 2018: Pocket Gangsters
- Selection for the feature film of 2017 by Under Ground Room: Pocket Gangsters
- Selection in HK world Intl. Film Festival 2016: Pocket Gangsters
- Winner of Bioscope Global Film Festival 2016: Pocket Gangsters
- Winner of 2nd Cinema London Film Festival 2017: Pocket Gangsters

== Reception ==
Times of India praised the project, writing "The plot has numerous twists and turns, the storytelling is highly cathartic and music is romantic. Truly a gangster spirited feature... the film engages you from the beginning till end with shock and awe."
