= Dharavi =

Slum in Mumbai, India

- Slum
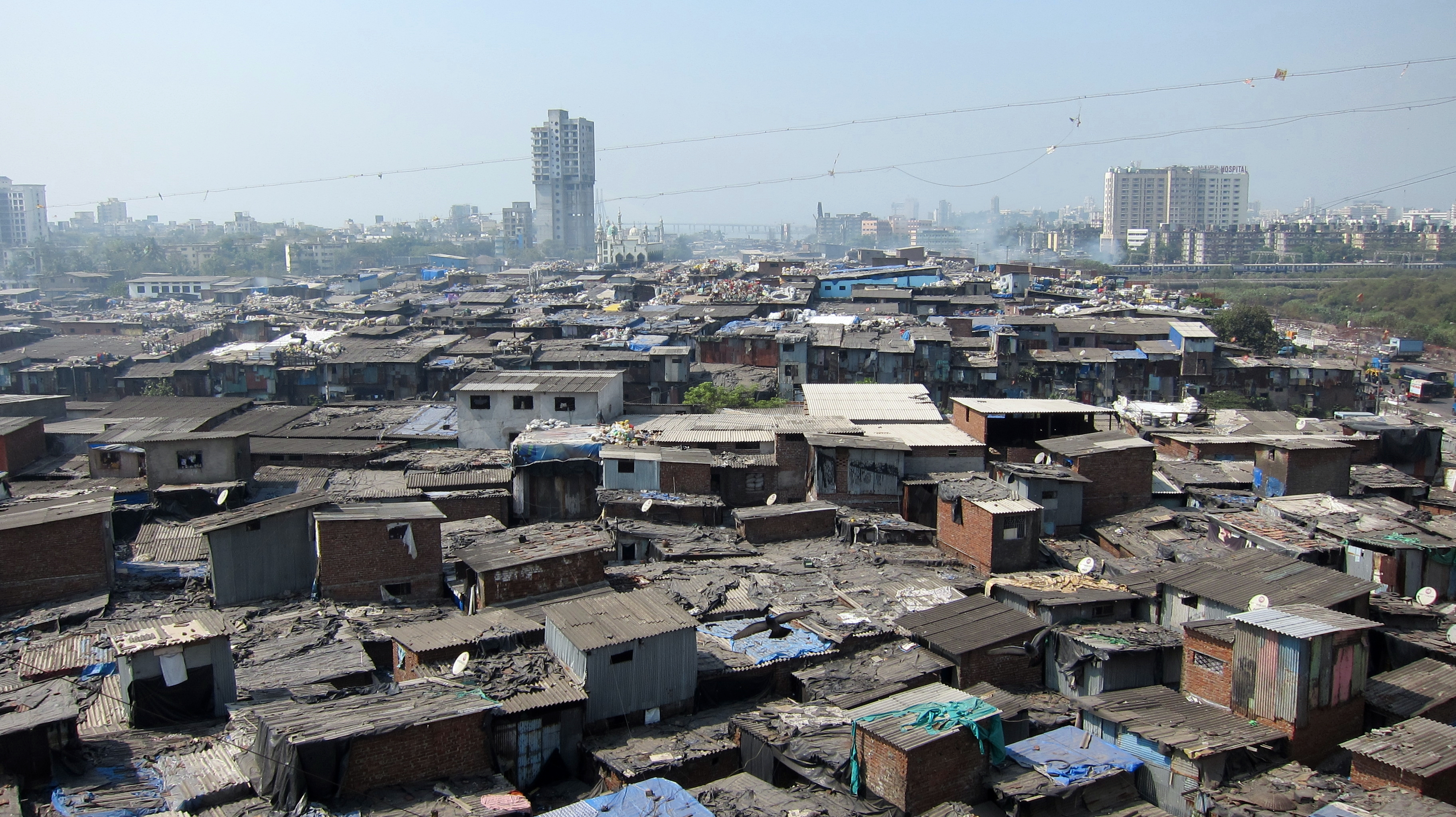
- View of Dharavi

- Dharavi, Mumbai, Maharashtra
- Coordinates: 19°02′16″N 72°51′13″E
- Country: India
- State: Maharashtra
- District: Mumbai City
- City: Mumbai
- Founded: 1884

Government
  - Type: Municipal corporation
  - Body: Brihanmumbai Municipal Corporation

Area
  - Total: 2.39 km^{2} (0.92 sq mi)
- Elevation: 20.47 m (67.2 ft)

Population (2016)
  - Estimate: 700,000 to 1,000,000

Language
  - Official: Marathi
- Time zone: UTC+05:30 (IST)
- PIN: 400017
- Telephone code: +9122
- Vehicle registration: MH-01
- Civic agency: BMC

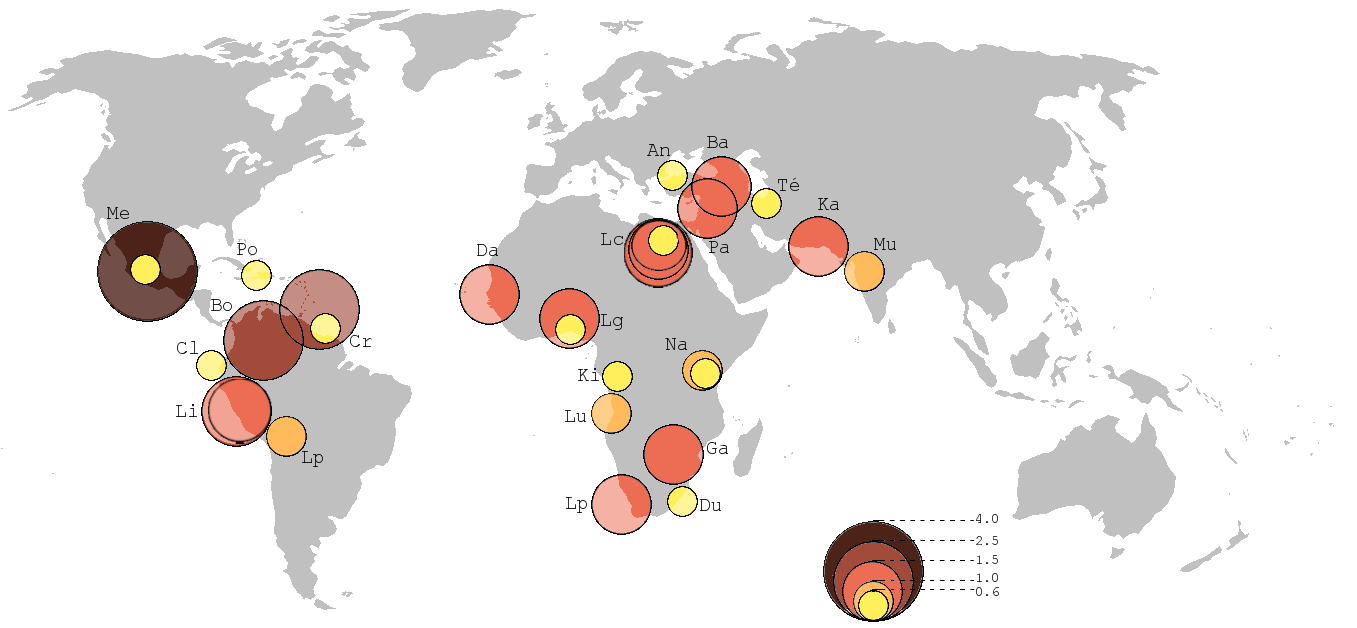
Dharavi compared to other large slums around the world. Map by Mike Davis.

Dharavi is a residential area in Mumbai, Maharashtra, India. It has often been considered one of the world's largest slums. It has an area of just over 2.39 square kilometres (0.92 sq mi; 590 acres) and a population of about 1,000,000. With a population density of over 418,410/km^{2} (1,083,677/sq mi), it is one of the most densely populated areas in the world.

The Dharavi slum was founded in 1884, during the British colonial era, and grew due to the expulsion of factories and residents from the peninsular city centre by the colonial government and the migration of rural Indians into urban Mumbai. For this reason, Dharavi is a highly diverse settlement, religiously and ethnically.

Dharavi has an active informal economy, in which household enterprises employ slum residents—leather, textiles, and pottery products are among the goods produced there. The total annual turnover was estimated to be over US$1 billion in 2009.

Dharavi has suffered from many epidemics and other disasters, including a widespread plague in 1896, which killed over half of the population of Mumbai. Sanitation in the slum remains poor.

== History ==
In the 18th century, Dharavi was an island with a mangrove swamp. It was a sparsely populated village before the late 19th century, inhabited by Koli fishers. It was then referred to as Koliwada.

=== Colonial era ===
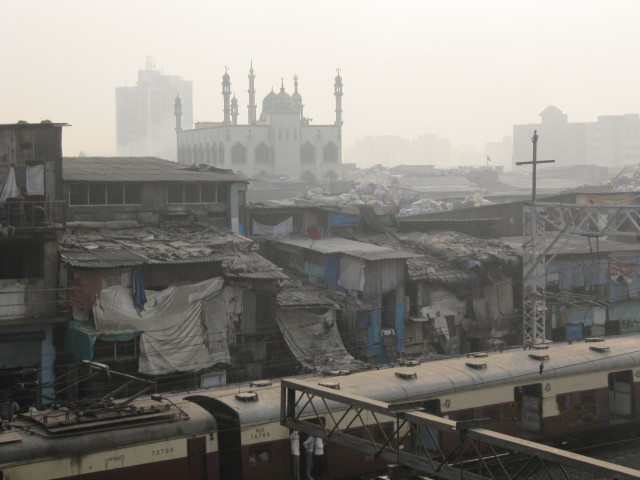
Shanty dwellings next to railway tracks in Dharavi (about 2010). A mosque inside the slum is visible. The railway network provides mass transit to slum residents.

In the 1850s, after decades of urban growth under the East India Company and the British Raj, Bombay's population reached half a million. The urban area covered mostly the southern extension of the peninsula, and its population density was over ten times higher than London's.

The most polluting industries were tanneries, and the first tannery moved from peninsular Bombay into Dharavi in 1887. People who worked with leather, typically a profession of the lowest Hindu castes and of Muslim Indians, moved to the village. Other early settlers included the Kumbhars, a large Gujarati community of potters. The colonial government granted them a 99-year land-lease in 1895. Rural migrants looking for jobs poured into Bombay, and its population soared past one million. Other artisans, including embroidery workers from Uttar Pradesh, started the ready-made garments trade. These industries created jobs, and labor moved in, but there was no government effort to plan or invest in infrastructure in or near Dharavi. Living quarters and small-scale factories grew haphazardly, without provision for sanitation, drainage, safe drinking water, roads, or other basic services. Gradually, the communities that settled in Dharavi formed organizations and political parties, building schools, temples, homes, and factories. Dharavi's first Hindu temple, Ganesh Mandir, was built in 1883, and its oldest mosque, Badi Masjid, opened in 1887.

=== Post-independence ===
By the time of India's independence from colonial rule in 1947, Dharavi had grown to be the largest slum in the entire country. It still had a few empty spaces, which continued to serve as waste-dumping grounds for operators across Bombay. The city, meanwhile, continued to grow. Soon, Dharavi was surrounded and became a key hub for the informal economy. Starting in the 1950s, proposals for Dharavi's redevelopment were periodically floated, but most of these plans failed due to lack of financial banking and/or political support. Dharavi's Co-operative Housing Society was formed in the 1960s to uplift the thousands of slum dwellers. By the late 20th century, Dharavi occupied about 175 hectares (432 acres), with a population density of more than 2,900 people per hectare (1,200/acre).

=== Redevelopment plans ===
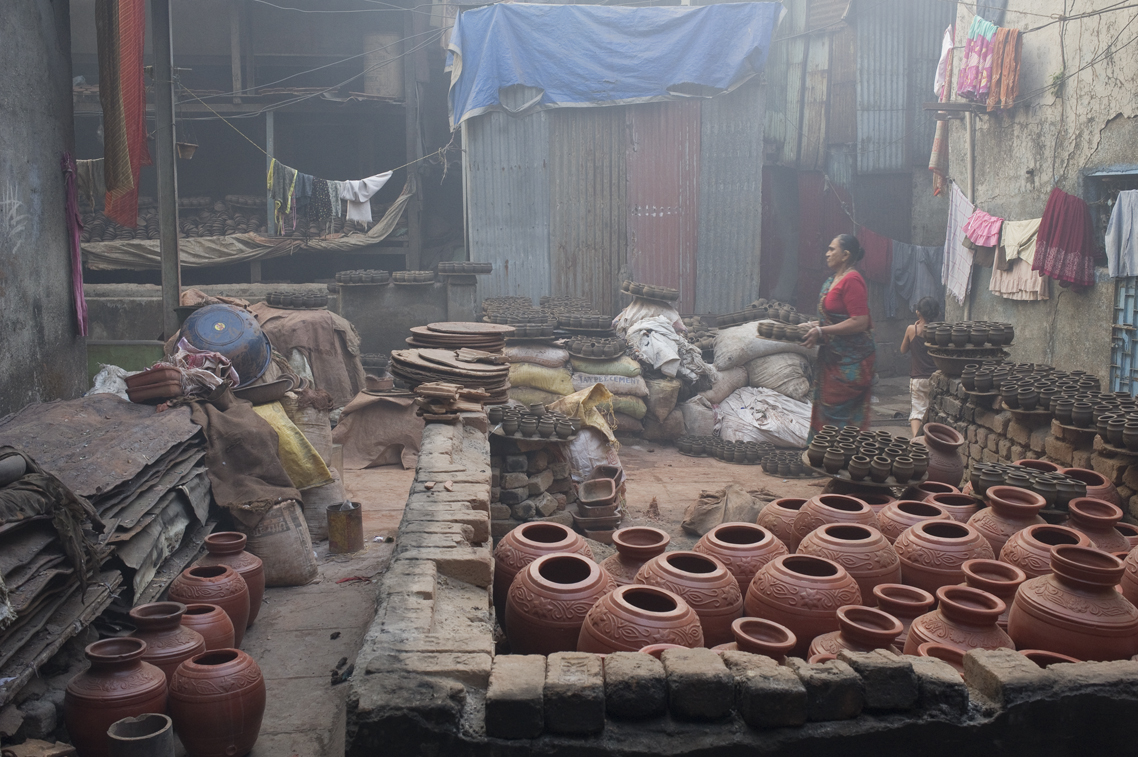
A traditional pottery unit in Dharavi

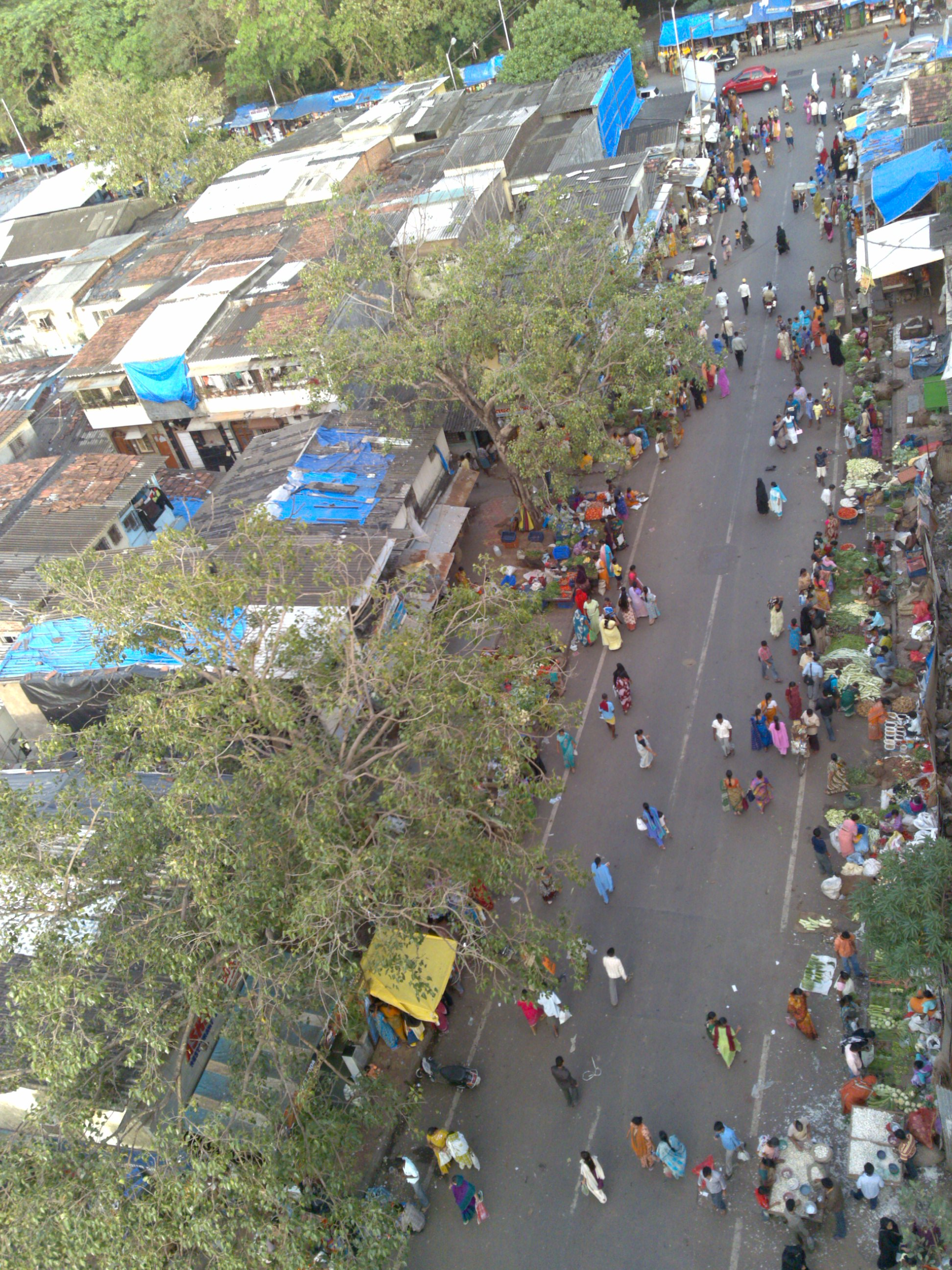
Street vendors and farmers' market along the road passing through Dharavi

There have been various plans since 1997 to redevelop Dharavi along the lines of slums in Hong Kong, such as Tai Hang. In 2004, the cost of redevelopment was estimated to be ₹5,000 crore (US$520 million).

A redevelopment plan managed by the American-trained architect Mukesh Mehta involved the construction of 2,800,000 square metres (30,000,000 sq ft) of housing, schools, parks, and roads to serve the 57,000 families residing there, along with 3,700,000 square metres (40,000,000 sq ft) of residential and commercial space for sale. In 2008, German students Jens Kaercher and Lucas Schwind won a Next Generation prize for their innovative redevelopment strategy designed to protect Dharavi's residents from needing to relocate.

In 2019, a Dubai-based firm, SecLink Group, proposed redeveloping the slum into a completely new area. In 2023, it became known that the Indian billionaire Gautam Adani intends to work on the reconstruction of Dharavi. Mumbai authorities estimated the total cost of the work to be $2.4 billion. As of April 2024, a survey was being conducted by the Adani Group to prepare Dharavi residents for the work. In December 2024, the company received a tender from the Government of Maharashtra to proceed with the work, after being challenged by the SecLink Group.

== Demographics ==
The total population of Dharavi is unknown due to rapid changes in the number of migrant workers coming from neighbouring Gujarat state, though voter turnout for the 2019 Maharashtra Legislative Assembly election was 119,092 (yielding a 60% rate). Some sources suggest it ranges from 300,000 to about a million. With the slum spread over 200 hectares (500 acres), it is estimated to have a population density of 869,565 people per square mile. Among its inhabitants, about 20% work on animal skin processing, tanneries, and leather goods. Other artisans specialise in pottery work, textile goods manufacturing, retail and trade, distilleries, and other caste-specific professions—all as small-scale household operations. With a literacy rate of 69%, Dharavi is the most literate slum in India.

The western edge of Dharavi is where its original inhabitants, the Kolis, reside. The slum includes speakers of various languages, such as Gujarati, Hindi, Marathi, Tamil, and Telugu. Residents include migrants from rural regions of many different states across India.

About 29% of the population of Dharavi is Muslim. The Christian population is estimated to be about 6%, while the rest are predominantly Hindus, with some Buddhists and other minority religions. The slum has numerous mosques, temples, and churches.

== Location and characteristics ==
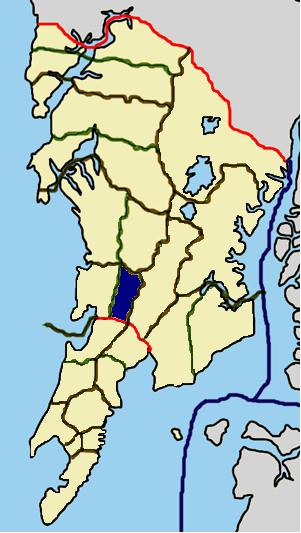
Dharavi, marked in dark blue, located within Mumbai (yellow)

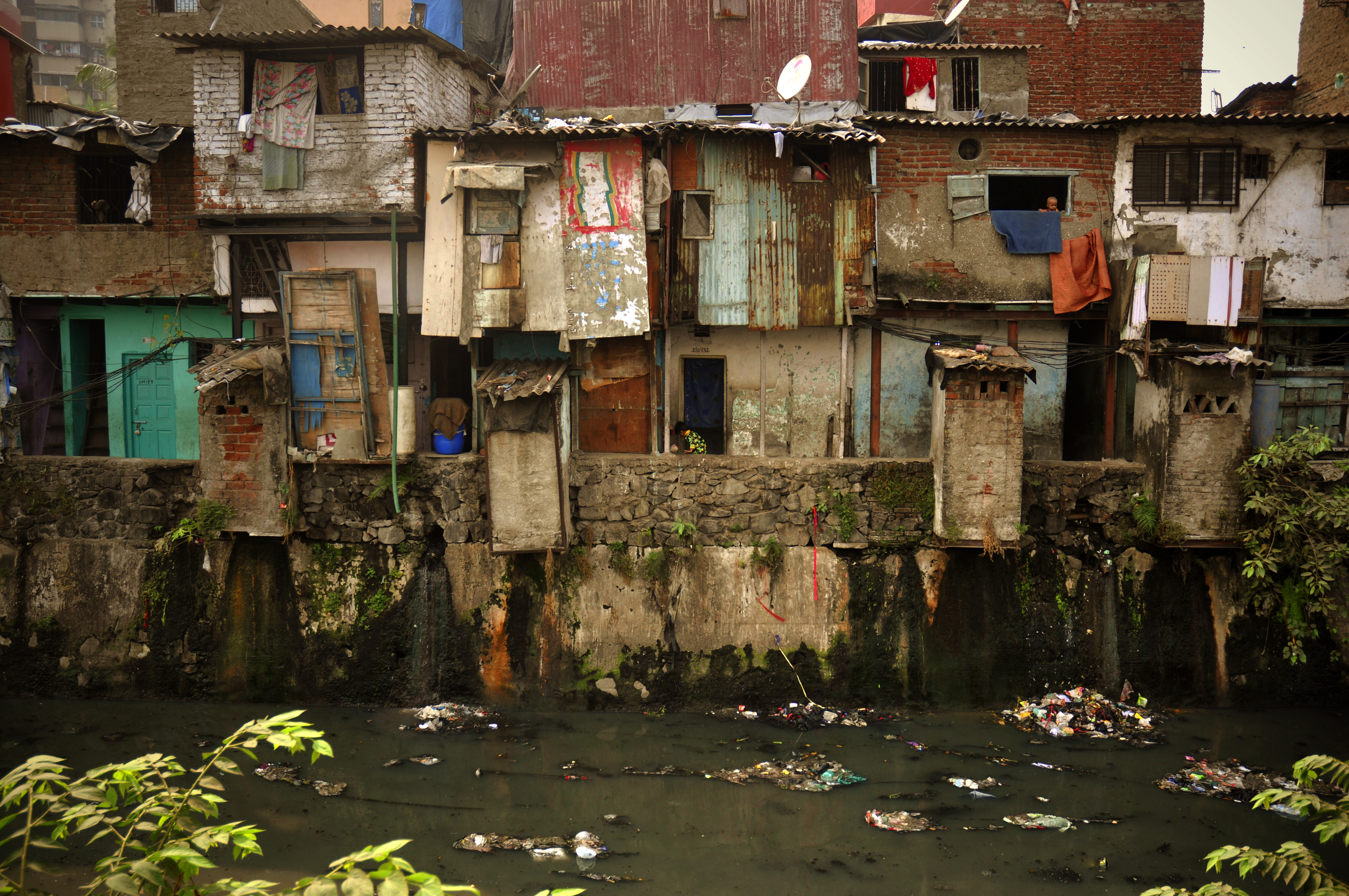
Slum shacks in Dharavi

Dharavi is considered one of the largest slums in the world. It is a large area situated between Mumbai's two main suburban railway lines, the Western and Central Railways. It is also adjacent to Mumbai Airport. To the west are Mahim and Bandra, and to the north lies the Mithi River, which empties into the Arabian Sea through the Mahim Creek. The area of Antop Hill lies to the east, while Matunga is to the south. Due to its location and poor sewerage and drainage systems, Dharavi is particularly vulnerable to flooding during the wet season.

== Economy ==
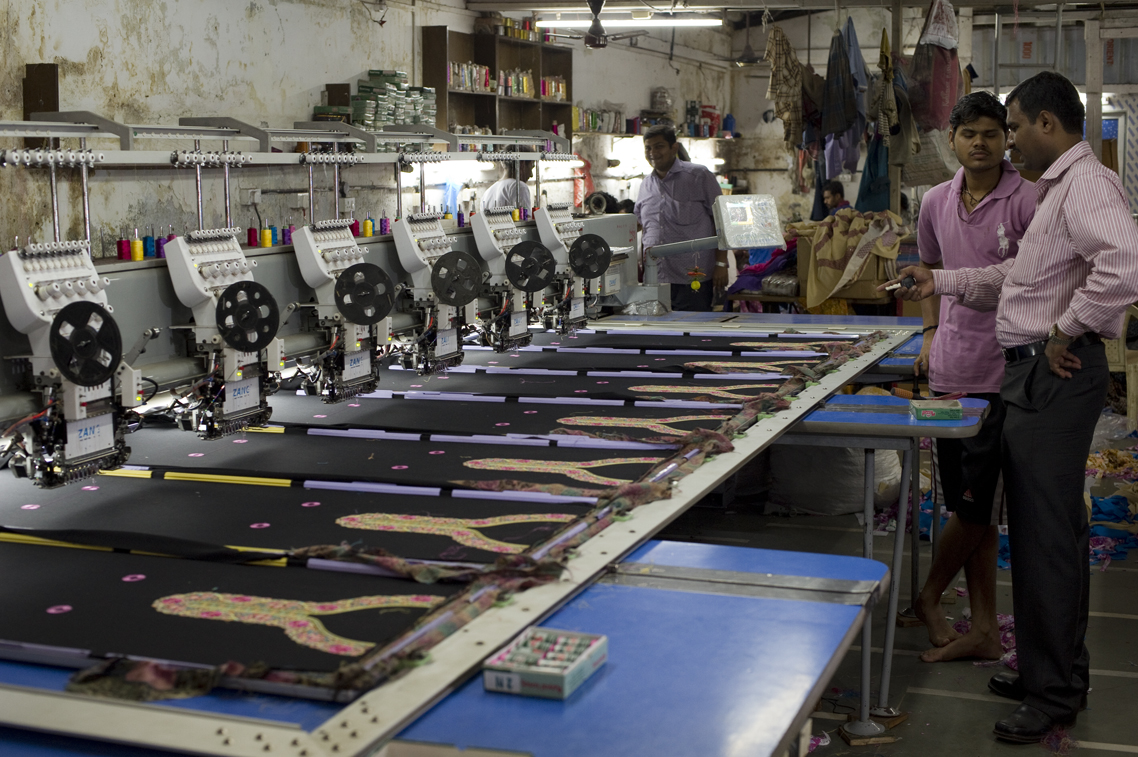
An embroidery shop in Dharavi

In addition to the traditional pottery and textile industries in Dharavi, there is an increasingly large recycling industry, processing waste from other parts of Mumbai. Recycling in Dharavi was reported to employ approximately 250,000 people in 2024. While it is a major industry in the neighborhood, it is also reported to be a source of heavy pollution. The district had an estimated 5,000 businesses as of 2010 and 15,000 single-room factories.

Dharavi exports goods around the world. Often these consist of various leather products, jewellery, various accessories, and textiles. Markets for Dharavi's goods include stores in the United States, Europe, and the Middle East. The total (and largely informal) economic turnover has been estimated to be between US$500 million or and US$650 million to over US$1 billion per year.

A few travel operators offer guided tours of the slum, showing its industrial and residential parts and explaining the problems and challenges Dharavi faces.

== Utility services ==
Potable water to Dharavi and the rest of Mumbai is supplied by the MCGM. However, a large amount of water is lost due to theft, illegal connections, and leakage.

Cooking gas is supplied in the form of LPG cylinders sold by state-owned oil companies as well as through piped natural gas, supplied by Mahanagar Gas Limited.

=== Sanitation issues ===
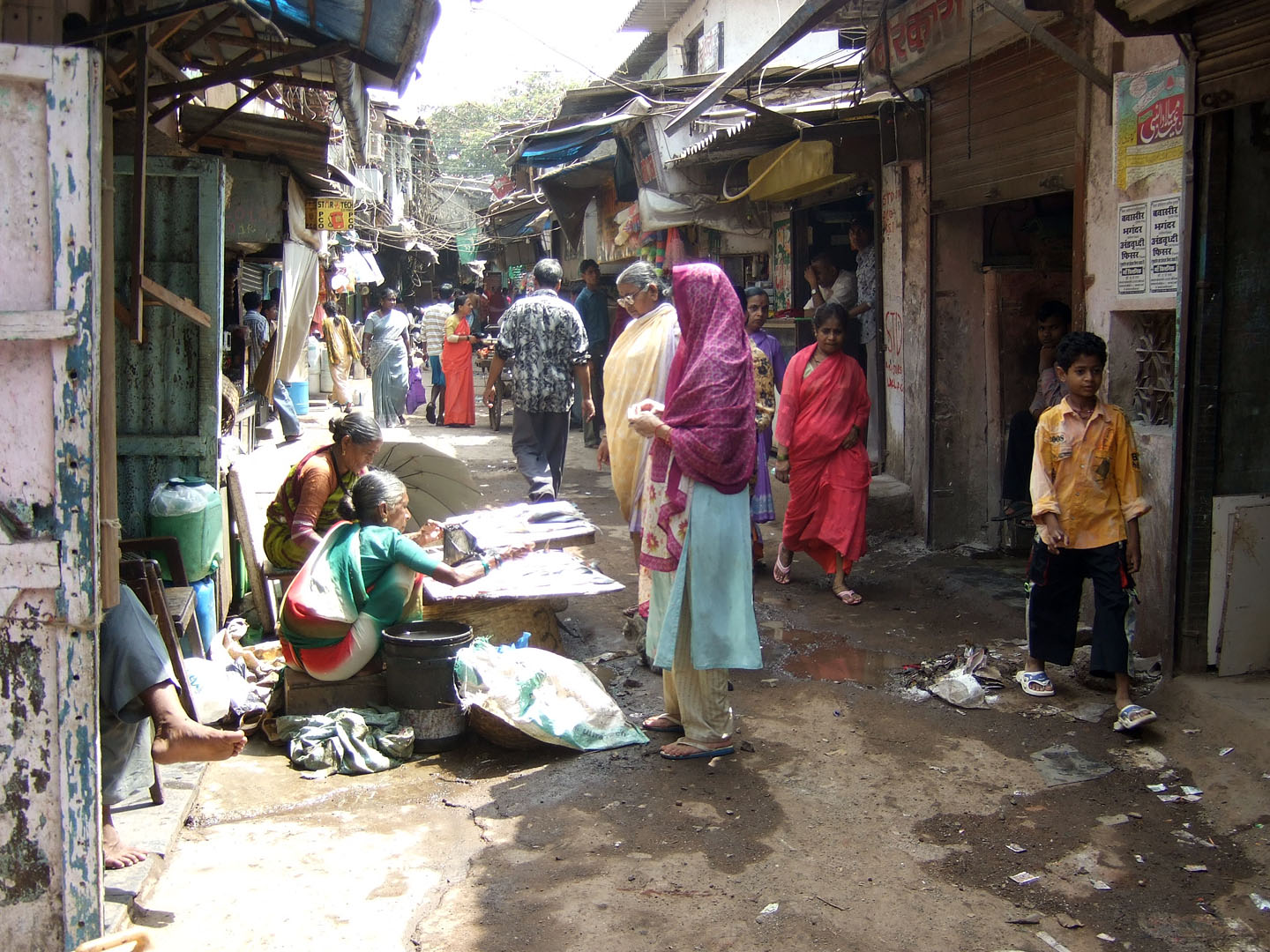
Inside Dharavi

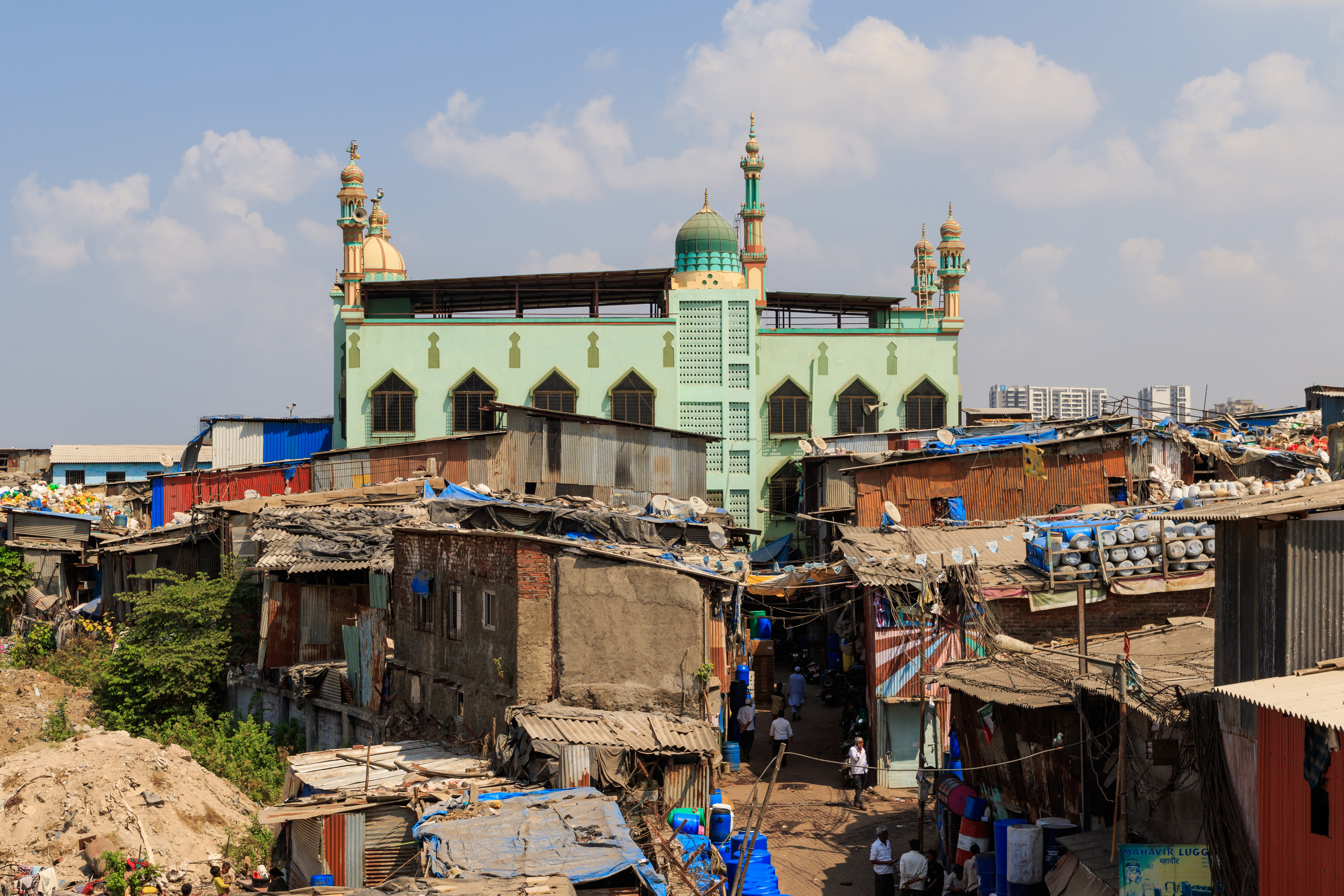
Mosque in Dharavi

Dharavi has severe problems with public health. Water access derives from public standpipes stationed throughout the slum. Additionally, lavatories are filthy and damaged to the point of being unsafe. Locals urinate and defecate into Mahim Creek, leading to the spread of contagious diseases. The open sewers in the city drain into the creek, causing a spike in water pollutants, septic conditions, and foul odours. Due to the air pollutants, diseases such as lung cancer, tuberculosis, and asthma are common among residents. Clothes are washed in water that people defecate in, causing a high daily incidence of typhoid. There have been government proposals for improving Dharavi's sanitation issues. In a 2006 Human Development Report by the UN, it was estimated that Dharavi had an average of one toilet for every 1,440 people.

== Epidemics and other disasters ==
Dharavi has experienced a long history of epidemics and natural disasters, sometimes with significant loss of life. The first plague to devastate the slum, along with other settlements of Mumbai, happened in 1896, when nearly half of the population died. A series of plagues and other epidemics continued to affect Dharavi, and Mumbai in general, for the next 25 years, with high rates of mortality. Dysentery epidemics have been common throughout the years, explained by the high population density of Dharavi. Other reported epidemics include typhoid, cholera, leprosy, amoebiasis, and polio. In 1986, a cholera epidemic was reported, with most patients being children. In recent years, cases of drug-resistant tuberculosis have been reported in Dharavi.

Fires and other disasters are common. For example, in 2005, massive floods caused deaths and extensive property damage. In January 2013, a fire destroyed many slum properties and caused injuries.

The COVID-19 pandemic also affected the slum, with the first case being reported in April 2020.

== In the media ==
From the main road leading through Dharavi, the place makes a desperate impression. However, once having entered the narrow lanes Dharavi proves that the prejudice of slums as dirty, underdeveloped, and criminal places does not fit real living conditions. Sure, communal sanitation blocks that are mostly in a miserable condition and overcrowded space do not comfort the living. Inside the huts, it is, however, very clean, and some huts share some elements of beauty. Nice curtains at the windows and balconies covered by flowers and plants indicate that people try to arrange their homes as cosy and comfortable as possible.

— Denis Gruber et al. (2005)

Dharavi was used as the backdrop to the 2008 British film Slumdog Millionaire. It has also been depicted in a number of Indian films, including Deewaar (1975), Nayakan (1987), Salaam Bombay! (1988), Parinda (1989), Dharavi (1992), Bombay (1995), Ram Gopal Varma's "Indian Gangster Trilogy" (1998–2005), the Sarkar series (2005–2017), Footpath (2003), Black Friday (2004), Mumbai Xpress (2005), No Smoking (2007), Traffic Signal (2007), Aamir (2008), Mankatha (2011), Thalaivaa (2013), Bhoothnath Returns (2014), Kaala (2018), and Gully Boy (2019).

Dharavi, Slum for Sale (2009), is a German documentary film by Lutz Konermann and Rob Appleby. In a programme aired in the United Kingdom in January 2010, Kevin McCloud and Channel 4 presented a two-part series titled Slumming It, which centered around Dharavi and its inhabitants. The poem "Blessing" by Imtiaz Dharker is about Dharavi not having enough water. The 2010 science fiction novel For the Win by Cory Doctorow is partially set in Dharavi. In 2014, Belgian researcher Katrien Vankrunkelsven made a 22-minute film about the slum, titled The Way of Dharavi.

Hitman 2, a video game released in 2018, featured the slums of Mumbai in one of its missions.

== See also ==
- Poverty in India
- List of slums in India
- Urbanisation in India
