= Dansh =

- Directed by: Kanika Verma
- Story by: Anish Verma
- Produced by: Anish Ranjan
- Starring: Kay Kay Menon; Sonali Kulkarni; Aditya Srivastav
- Cinematography: Chirantan Das
- Edited by: Hemanti Sarkar
- Music by: Fazal Qureshi
- Production company: Talking Pictures
- Distributed by: A Seven Entertainment
- Release date: 2 September 2005
- Country: India
- Language: Hindi

Dansh is a 2005 Hindi-language drama film directed by Kanika Verma and produced by Anish Ranjan. The film features Kay Kay Menon, Sonali Kulkarni, and Aditya Srivastava in titular roles. The film is based on the armed struggle of the Mizoram National Front with the Indian Army, along with blood, torture, and rape sequences. The film is a remake of the movie "Death and the Maiden."

== Plot ==
The actual story begins in 1986, when the MNF signs a truce agreement with the Indian government. The rebels are torn between their heads and their hearts. How can we make peace with the soldiers who raped our women and pillaged our land? The leader Mathew is the voice of reason: we have to forget the past for the future; the people want peace; he urges and prevails. Even as Mizoram celebrates, a chance meeting finds Mathew inviting a Mumbai-based Mizo doctor over to his house. After a drinking bout pondering war and peace, the doctor is in no state to drive home, and Mathew asks him to stay over. Upstairs, Maria, Mathew's wife and fellow rebel, has recognised the man downstairs as the doctor in the Indian Army camp who raped her repeatedly when she had been caught and interrogated. She wants revenge. But she never saw the army camp doctor. She was blindfolded all the time. So how is she sure this man is the same? A horror-struck Mathew demands of his wife when he finds she has bound the doctor to a chair and started torturing him. I remember his voice; I remember his smell, Maria says. I am innocent; your wife has gone mad because of the army torture, the doctor pleads. What follows is a night of self-discovery for Mathew, Maria, and the doctor. And perhaps a message for terrorists who believe the 'cause' justifies the means, as well as people who feel the gun is the only solution for dealing with aggrieved, angry people.

== Cast ==
- Kay Kay Menon as Matthew
- Sonali Kulkarni as Maria
- Aditya Srivastava as Dr. John Sanga
- Vijay Raj as Village Doctor

== Music ==
The music of the film is composed by Fazal Qureshi and lyrics are penned by Nida Fazli.

#	Title	Singer(s)
1	"Akash door hain lekin"	Kailash Kher
2	"Har taraf andhera hai"	Vinod Rathod
3	"Saje hain sapon ke"	Kunal Ganjawala, Shreya Ghoshal
4	"Yeh dharti hai"	Vinod Rathod
