= Koliwada =

Colony of Koli ethnic group in India

Koliwada refers to a colony of the Koli people in India. Several places named Koliwada are located across the Mumbai city in India:

- Khar Danda Koliwada
- Sion Koliwada (Now known as Guru Tegh Bahadur Nagar)
- Bunderpakhadi Koliwada
- Thane Koliwada
- Juhu Koliwada
- Charkop Koliwada
- Panvel Koliwada
- Colaba Koliwada
- Trombay Koliwada, Chembur
- Worli Koliwada
- Mora Gaothan Koliwada, Juhu
- Versova Koliwada
- Dharavi Koliwada
- Vazira Koliwada, Borivali
- Vasai Koliwada
- Naigaon Koliwada
- Mahim Koliwada
- Madh Koliwada, Madh Island
- Ghansoli Koliwada

== Fish market ==
A Koli fish market

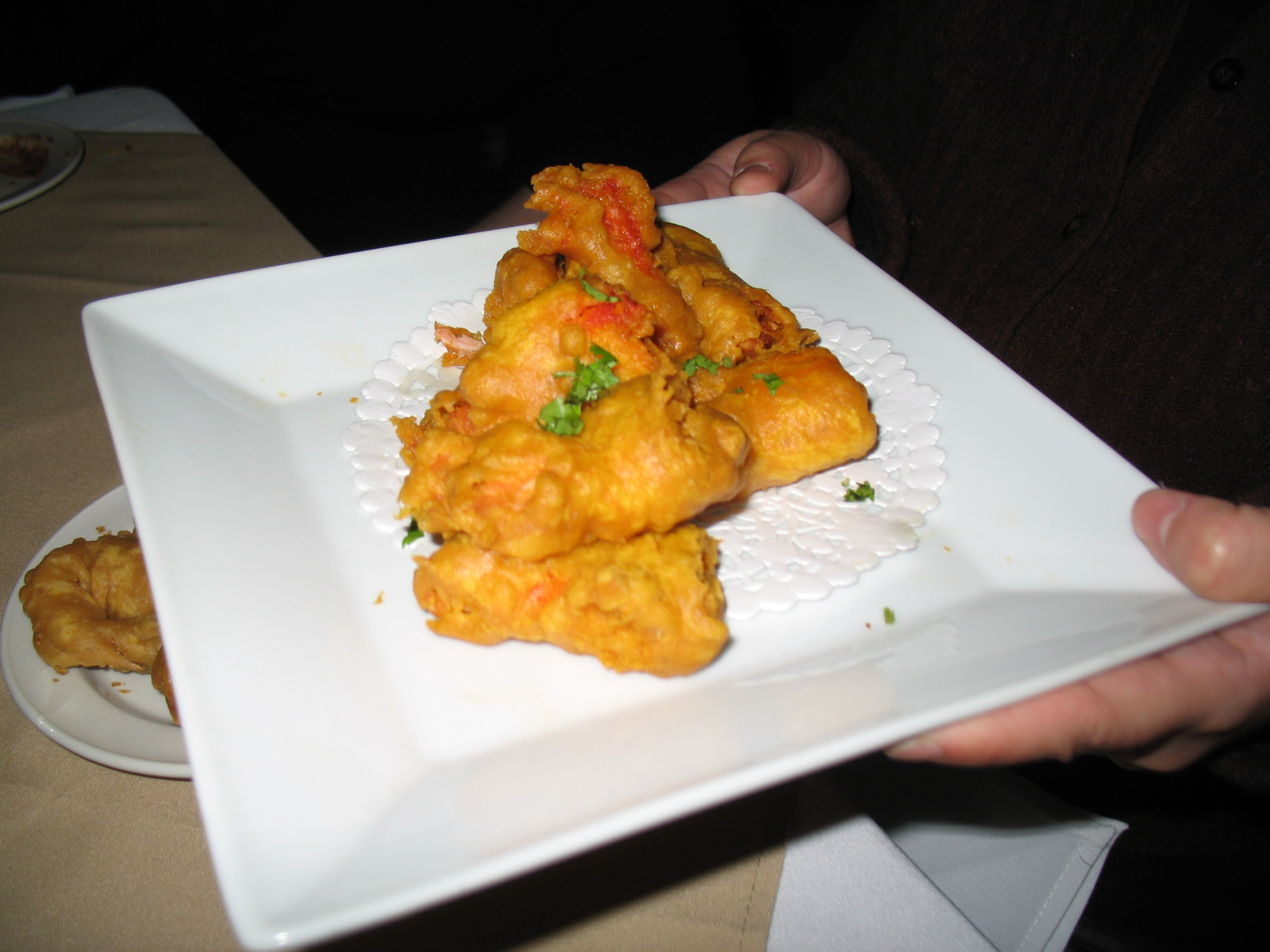
Fish Koliwada is named after Koliwada

A machhi market, or fish market is usually located near the entrance of the Koliwada locality, or the nearest bus stand or main road. In Mumbai, very few Koli communities can afford to build dedicated markets reserved for Koli fisherfolk, and therefore, most fish markets are open for sellers from other communities as well.

== Bandar/Port ==
Koliwada Bandarpada

A bandar is the sea shore near boat jetty where fishing boats are anchored. Many fishing nets and other accessories are stored around this area. This area usually is open area and also a location for gathering of many folks in special events. In summer, this area is also used for drying out the fish.

== See also ==
- List of Koli people
- List of Koli states and clans
