= Carl Wharton =

English actor

- Citizenship: United Kingdom
- Occupation: Actor
- Years active: 1990–present
- Known for: The Waking of a Nation; Jaanisaar; The Perfect Husband
- Height: 182 cm (6 ft 0 in)
- Website: carlwhartonactor.co.uk

Carl Wharton is an English actor best known for playing Lord William Hunter in the series The Waking of a Nation, Sir John Cavendish in the Indian historical drama film Jaanisaar, and Forest Ranger in the Italian horror film The Perfect Husband. In addition, he has appeared in a wide range of independent and international films, earning recognition for his versatility and depth as a performer.

== Acting career ==
With a career spanning film and television, Wharton has been active in the entertainment industry since the 1990s.

In 2012, Wharton played role of The Vicar, in the Indian film Saint Dracula 3D, directed by Rupesh Paul.

In 2013, Wharton played General Carter in Zombie Massacre, along with Christian Boeving, produced by Uwe Boll.

In 2014, he played the important role in the horror film The Perfect Husband along with Gabriella Wright, Tania Bambaci and Philippe Reinhardt directed by Lucas Pavetto.

In 2015, Wharton appeared as Sir John Cavendish in the historical drama film Jaanisaar, along with Imran Abbas, Pernia Qureshi, Muzaffar Ali, Dalip Tahil and Farrukh Jaffar, directed by Muzaffar Ali.

Wharton was cast in The Convent as Farmer, which stars Michael Ironside, Rosie Day, Hannah Arterton and Dilan Gwyn.

In 2025, Wharton appeared as William Wilson Hunter in The Waking of a Nation, a Hindi-language historical drama web series streaming on SonyLIV based on the events leading to the Jallianwala Bagh massacre in 1919. It was directed by Ram Madhvani and produced by Amita Madhvani and Ram Madhvani, under banner of Ram Madhvani Films.

== Filmography ==
=== Film ===
Year	Title	Role	Reference
2012	Saint Dracula 3D	The Vicar	
2013	Zombie Massacre	General Carter	
2013	Wrath of the Crows	Grave digger	
2014	The Perfect Husband	Forest Ranger	
2015	Jaanisaar	Sir John Cavendish	
2018	The Convent	Farmer	
2019	Turkish Ice Cream	General Henry Willetra	
2019	The Tombs	Gary	
2024	The Shamrock Spitfire	Group Captain Mallory	
2025	Dig Me No Grave	Scott Parker Snr.	

=== Television ===
Year	Title	Role	Notes
1990	ScreenPlay	Undercover Policeman	1 episode
1990	Crimewatch	Criminal - Driver	1 episode
2006	New Street Law	Tattooed face criminal	1 episode
2017	Feel the Dead	Doctor Chris	3 episodes
2025	The Waking of a Nation	Lord William Hunter	6 episodes
