= Kabhie Ajnabi The =

- Theatrical poster of the film
- Directed by: Vijay Singh
- Screenplay by: Ravindra Peepat
- Story by: Rohini Patwardhan
- Produced by: Vijay Singh
- Starring: Sandeep Patil; Syed Kirmani; Sachin Tendulkar (Cameo); Poonam Dhillon; Debashree Roy; Iftekhar; Ram Sethi
- Cinematography: Debu Deodhar
- Edited by: Vijay Singh
- Music by: Vijay Singh
- Release date: 1 March 1985
- Running time: 155 mins
- Country: India
- Language: Hindi

Kabhie Ajnabi The (lit. 'Were once strangers') is a 1985 Indian musical romantic drama film directed, edited and produced by Vijay Singh. The story was written by Rohini Patwardhan. Screenplay was written by Ravindra Peepat. The cinematographer of the film is Debu Deodhar. It revolves around a young cricketer who has lost his ladylove and when he again falls in love with another woman, his former ladylove returns. The film stars Sandeep Patil as the protagonist and Syed Kirmani as one of the antagonists. Poonam Dhillon and Debashree Roy star as the heroines of the film. The film also features Sachin Tendulkar in a small part. The music of the film was also composed by Vijay Singh with lyrics by Dev Kohli and Ravindra Peepat.

The film was much discussed in media and over-hyped regarding the Bollywood debut of two Indian cricketers Sandeep Patil and Syed Kirmani, who were at that time basking in the glory of the 1983 Cricket World Cup victory. The film was highly publicised on the sequence of fight between the two cricketers as well as Roy's sensuous enacting with Patil in the song sequence Geet Mere Hothon Ko De Gaya Koi as the actress was at that time, having a love affair with the cricketer. Filmfare wrote on the presentation of Debashree Roy in the song sequence, "With those cohl eyes and her figure scantily covered with, she looked enthralling yet she looked coy enough." Filmsack wrote on Roy's look in the song sequence, "She reminisced the amorous avatar of Sharmila Tagore in Aradhana." The film earned Roy the Calcutta and National Unity Award for Best Supporting Actress in Hindi Cinema of 1985. The film was presumed to be a huge hit at box office. It opened with 80% seat occupancy, but ultimately proved itself to be a major debacle at box office due to its weak screenplay. The Tribune wrote: "In contrast to their heroics in the 1983 World Cup, Patil and Kirmani were clean bowled on the big screen." In 1986, the film was enlisted by Filmfare in the ten most disappointing films of 1985.

== Plot ==
Sandeep is a famous cricketer who is in love with Asha the beautiful daughter of a famous industrialist. Asha's father is not much up on his feet to have a cricketer as his son-in-law, rather he wants Asha to marry Shakti. But he eventually agrees when he learns that Asha will not marry anyone but Sandeep. Sandeep meets Asha's father who says that he wants to talk to Sandeep's father to fix their date of wedding. On hearing this, Sandeep remains silent and Asha's father concludes that his father is no more in this world. He tells that he would like to talk to Sandeep's mother. Shakti learns that Asha's father is planning an appointment with Sandeep's mother as he wants to fix his daughter's wedding to Sandeep. Shakti informs Sandeep's father all about this. Sandeep along with his mother comes to visit Asha's father and they have a hearty conversation. Suddenly Sandeep's father arrives there. It is revealed that his father is a fool and Sandeep's mother is married to someone else to get rid of her bibulous, contemptible husband. Asha's father declares that he will not approve his daughter to get married in an obnoxious pedigree like Sandeep's. Later on Asha tells Sandeep that he should have informed her all about his family so that she could have taken precautions to keep things right. Shakti meets Asha and learns that his plan is not a success yet. She still wants to marry Sandeep. He hires a powerful swashbuckler who along with his gang attacks Sandeep one night and fractured one of his legs severely. As a result, his career comes to halt.

Asha gets involved in a heated conversation with her father when she reveals that she is still willing to marry Sandeep and will not marry anyone but him. When her father says that he will not accept Sandeep as his son-in-law, she declares that she is going to leave him and the house behind to settle with Sandeep. Her father feels a terrible shock on hearing this and he has a heart attack. Asha calls her house physician immediately and her father is saved. Asha dares not voice against her father any more. Sandeep comes to Asha's house where he meets Asha's father who tells him that Asha has changed her mind and soon she will marry Shakti. Sandeep becomes frustrated. He leaves his city and moves to a far away place where he meets another beautiful woman named Geeta who is an aspiring singer. Sandeep saves her from a ruffian named Kundan and she falls in love with him. He tells her everything about his past life. She becomes empathetic towards him and starts to take care of him. Soon he too falls in love with Geeta. Finally Sandeep regains strength of his leg and Geeta keeps motivating him to resume his left over career. Sandeep finally assents to Geeta and goes to Mumbai to recommence his career.

Asha comes to look for Sandeep and meets Geeta. Geeta learns that Asha never married and still loves Sandeep like she used to earlier. Geeta listens to Asha but never reveals that Sandeep is her fiancée now. She understands that Sandeep has misapprehended Asha by listening to the words from some other person but Asha and whenever his misapprehension will be over, he will go back to his former beloved. She decides to sacrifice for the sake of Asha's love for Sandeep. Asha wants to know whether Geeta has ever been love with someone. Geeta confirms that she has been but does not reveal the name of her beloved. Geeta and Asha go to the station to receive Sandeep. Asha requests Geeta to walk forward and inform him that she is here to meet him. Sandeep comes forward and ardently embraces Geeta into his arms without observing Asha who is watching it from the far. Geeta brings Asha to Sandeep's notice and tells him about the misunderstanding. Sandeep cannot decide which side to choose now. Asha perceives that Sandeep has fallen for Geeta. She boards the train leaving Sandeep and Geeta in the station.

== Cast ==
- Sandeep Patil as Sandeep
- Syed Kirmani
- Poonam Dhillon as Asha
- Debashree Roy as Geeta
- Iftekhar as Asha's father
- Ram Sethi as Karim
- Ramesh Deo
- Seema Deo as Sandeep's mother
- Narendra Nath as Kundan
- Shakti Kapoor as Shakti
- Sachin Tendulkar (Cameo)
- S.K. Wankhede (Cameo)
- Ashok Mankad(Cameo)

== Crew ==
Role	Name
Art Director	Shibu
Executive Producer	Anil Tejani
Editing	Vijay Singh
Cinematography	Debu Deodhar
Story	Rohini V Patwardhan
Screenplay	Ravindra Peepat
Dialogues	Vijay Singh
Lyrics	Dev Kohli, Ravindra Peepat
Music	Vijay Singh

== Production ==
The film was much discussed in media and over-hyped regarding the Bollywood debut of Patil and Kirmani who were at that time basking in the glory of the 1983 Cricket World Cup victory. Reportedly Patil was so occupied with his Bollywood debut that he refused to participate in some of the matches of the West Indies tour in 1983.

"In our original script Kirmani was not included. He came in only because he was keen to perform some kind of role. We literally had to find him a place in the movie. The scene between Kiri and me got tremendous publicity."

— Extract from Sandy Storm by Sandeep Patil

Initially Kirmani was not a part of the film. He was given the role because he wanted to be part of the film. The film was highly publicised on the fight sequence between the two cricketers. Patil met Sachin Tendulkar for the first time while shooting for a sequence at RCF ground. The sequence demanded Patil visiting 21 boys who would be practicing cricket. Tendulkar was one of those boys who were taken to the location by Deepak Murakar.

Regarding the song sequence Geet Mere Hothon Ko De Gaya Koi, cinematographer Debu Deodhar wanted to present Roy in a full-fledged amorous avatar, but Vijay Singh apprehended that it might be over-erotic for Indian audience. Reportedly Patil had an alleged liaison with Roy on the set. The film was highly advertised on the song sequence Geet Mere Hothon Ko De Gaya Koi which highlighted the chemistry between Roy and Patil.

== Soundtrack ==
No.	Title	Singer	Length
1.	"Geet Mere Hothon Ko"	Lata Mangeshkar
2.	"Kabhie Ajnabi The Zameen Aasman"	Lata Mangeshkar, Suresh Wadkar
3.	"Dil Ki Is Dehleez Tak (male)"	Ashok Khare
4.	"Dil Ki Is Dehleej Tak (female)"	Lata Mangeshkar
5.	"Is Dafaa"	Lata Mangeshkar
6.	"Aaja Mere Sanam"	Lata Mangeshkar
7.	"Ik Hasin Diwana Kar Gayi"	Annette Pinto, Sunita, Vinay Tiwari

== Reception ==
Patil failed to achieve critical favour for his performance in the film. ESPN wrote on his performance: "he even aces the love-struck Hindi film hero's signature move of producing notes from a guitar without moving either hand." Sportstar commented on his performance that he acted "dashed awkward" in the film. The Tribune wrote: "In contrast to their heroics in the 1983 World Cup, Patil and Kirmani were clean bowled on the big screen." Roy was praised for her performance. Filmfare wrote on the presentation of Roy in the song sequence Geet Mere Hothon Ko De Gaya Koi, "With those cohl eyes and her figure scantily covered with, she looked enthralling yet she looked coy enough." Filmsack wrote on Roy's look in the song sequence: "She reminisced the amorous avatar of Sharmila Tagore in Aradhana." Koimoi wrote: "she looked like a blooming blossom tightened against Sandeep Patil's torso." The film opened with 80% seat occupancy but ultimately became a major debacle at box office. In 1986, Filmfare named it in the listicle of Ten Most Disappointing Films of 1985.
