= Renu Saluja =

Indian film editor

- Born: 5 July 1952; Delhi, India
- Died: 16 August 2000 (aged 48); Mumbai, Maharashtra, India
- Occupation: Film editor
- Years active: 1980–2000
- Spouses: Vidhu Vinod Chopra (m. 1976; div. 1983) Sudhir Mishra (m. 1988–2000)
- Relatives: Radha Saluja (sister)

Renu Saluja (5 July 1952 – 16 August 2000) was an Indian film editor. In the 1980s and 1990s, she worked with both mainstream and art house Hindi cinema directors, including Govind Nihalani, Vidhu Vinod Chopra, Sudhir Mishra, Shekhar Kapoor, Mahesh Bhatt, and Vijay Singh. Her work encompassed multiple feature films, documentaries, short films, and television series.

Renu was a four-time winner of National Film Award for Best Editing for Parinda (1989), Dharavi (1993), Sardar (1993) and Godmother (1999) and won Filmfare Award for best editing for Parinda (1989) and 1942: A Love Story (1994).

== Early life and education ==
Renu was born into a Punjabi Hindu family. She applied to the direction program at the Film and Television Institute of India in Pune in 1974, but was not accepted and ended up on the editing program instead. She graduated in 1976 and began a career as a film editor in India, a field dominated by men at the time.

== Career ==
She first edited Vidhu Vinod Chopra's diploma film, Murder at Monkey Hill (1976), for which she also received an Associate Director credit. The film subsequently won the National Film Award for the Best Experimental Film in 1977–78. Once out of the FTII, Renu made her debut with classmate Saeed Akhtar Mirza's Albert Pinto Ko Gussa Kyon Ata Hai (1980), followed by Vidhu Vinod Chopra's Sazaye Maut (1981), then another classmate Kundan Shah's comedy, Jaane Bhi Do Yaaro (1983), where her work received critical acclaim. Her early work was in parallel cinema with her FTII colleagues, Vidhu Vinod Chopra, Saeed Mirza, Kundan Shah, and Ashok Ahuja.

The first offer that Renu got from outside the circle of FTII filmmakers was Govind Nihalani's Ardh Satya, filmed in 1983. After this her career took off, including a stint with Doordarshan.

Chopra's Parinda was among the first mainstream films that Renu edited, and she also assisted direction. Unlike the smaller films which were made in one schedule, with the entire film completed before she started editing, Parinda was a more complex production shot over a period of three years.

In the 1990s Renu was involved in both mainstream cinema and the new crop of independent films that appeared following the success of Hyderabad Blues. Some of the well-known films edited by Renu include Jaane Bhi Do Yaaron (1983), Kabhi Haan Kabhi Naa (1993), Bandit Queen (1995), Jaya Ganga (1996), Pardes (1997), Rockford (1999) and Hey Ram (2000). Nagesh Kukunoor's Bollywood Calling and finally Calcutta Mail released in 2003 was her last edited film.

== Personal life ==
Her elder sister Radha Saluja was a film actress, who worked in numerous Hindi, Punjabi and other regional films, and younger sister Dr. Kumkum Khadalia is a plastic surgeon. Renu married director Vidhu Vinod Chopra, a fellow FTII alumnus when they graduated in 1976. They later worked together on Jaane Bhi Do Yaaron (1983), where Vinod was the production manager and she was the editor. Even though they later separated, she continued to edit all his films and was his assistant director. Later in life, she became close with director Sudhir Mishra, many of whose films she worked on, including Dharavi and Is Raat Ki Subah Nahin (1996).

She died in Mumbai, on 16 August 2000, after a long bout of stomach cancer.

== Legacy ==
In 2006, GraFTII, the Alumnus Association of FTII released a book on her titled, 'Invisible - The Art of Renu Saluja'. In a 2005 interview, noted director, Sudhir Mishra, said that the principal character, Geeta in his acclaimed film, Hazaaron Khwaishein Aisi (2005), "..is the amalgamation of all the spirited women I've known, my tribute to Renu Saluja.". Later in 2006, she became the first editor to have Editing Award named after her.

In June 2009, GraFTII and E-City ventures, held a tribute festival of her films, including a documentary in which all the directors Saluja worked with shared their memories of her.

== Partial filmography ==
Film	Year
Murder at Monkey Hill	1976
Albert Pinto Ko Gussa Kyon Ata Hai	1980
Sazaye Maut	1981
Jaane Bhi Do Yaaro	1983
Ardh Satya	1983
Mohan Joshi Hazir Ho!	1984
Party	1984
Janam	1985
New Delhi Times	1986
Yeh Woh Manzil To Nahin	1987
Mil Gayi Manzil Mujhe	1988
Pestonjee	1988
Main Zinda Hoon	1988
Parinda	1989
Dharavi	1991
Vembanad	1990
Miss Beatty's Children	1992
Kabhi Haan Kabhi Naa	1993
Sardar	1993
1942: A Love Story	1994
Tarpan	1994
Papa Kehte Hain	1995
Bandit Queen	1995
Is Raat Ki Subah Nahin	1996
Do Rahain	1997
Pardes	1997
Kareeb	1998
Jab Pyaar Kisise Hota Hai	1998
Hyderabad Blues	1998
Jaya Ganga	1998
Godmother	1999
Senso Uniquo	1999
Split Wide Open	1999
Rockford	1999
Hey Ram	2000
Bollywood Calling	2001
Calcutta Mail	2003

== Awards ==
- National Film Award
  - 1990: Best Editing: Parinda
  - 1992: Best Editing: Dharavi
  - 1994: Best Editing: Sardar
  - 1999: Best Editing: Godmother
- Filmfare Award
  - 1989: Best Editing: Parinda
  - 1995: Best Editing: 1942: A Love Story
- Star Screen Award
  - 1996: Best Editing: Is Raat Ki Subah Nahin
