= Train to Pakistan =

1956 historical novel by Khushwant Singh

- First edition
- Author: Khushwant Singh
- Language: English
- Genre: Historical novel
- Publisher: Chatto & Windus
- Publication date: 1956
- Publication place: India
- Media type: Print (Hardback & Paperback)
- Pages: 181
- ISBN: 0-8371-8226-3 (reissue)

Train to Pakistan is a historical novel by writer Khushwant Singh, published in 1956. It recounts the Partition of India in August 1947 through the perspective of Mano Majra, a fictional border village.

Instead of depicting the Partition in terms of only the political events surrounding it, Khushwant Singh digs into a deep local focus, providing a human dimension which brings to the event a sense of reality, horror, and believability.

== Plot ==
Mano Majra, the fictional village on the border of Pakistan and India in which the story takes place, is predominantly Muslim and Sikh.

The town is next to a railroad station that is frequently visited by trains on a certain schedule. Jaggat Singh, a local hooligan has an affair with the daughter of the local Imam - Nooran. One day in Mano Majra, a group of robbers enter Hindu moneylender Lala Ram Lal's home and murder him while stealing his belongings. The criminals, who were previously acquainted with Jaggat, throw a bag of broken bangles in the courtyard of his house as they leave. Jaggat who had snuck out of the village that night to see Nooran sees the criminals as they undo their head coverings in the forest, recognizing one as Malli of another neighboring village. The next day, a magistrate and a group of soldiers arrive in the station. At the same time, Iqbal, a foreign educated man who is politically active arrives. He is of Sikh descent but is clean shaven, cuts his long hair, and is circumsized. The magistrate is given befitting accommodations by the superintendent, who arranges for a group of performers and a young prostitute to entertain him. The magistrate orders for Jaggat and Iqbal to be arrested, making up fake charges. Iqbal is charged as Iqbal Mohammed, a leader of the Muslim League, when in fact he is of Sikh origin and is of the People's League of India. He was assigned to Mano Majra to educate the people there to rise up and claim independence from the corrupt government.

A train arrives in the station, from Pakistan, and it is full of dead Sikhs. The police burn their corpses but the next day marks the beginning of the winter monsoon, putting out the fire. As time passes, tensions rise, the nearby Sutlej River gets flooded and the villagers see the corpses of hundreds of dead people.

The magistrate gets increasingly stressed and is consoled by the young prostitute, who he takes a liking to. The villagers hear of increased violence on both Sikh and Muslim sides to each other. Malli and his gang are taken to the prison but later released. They are Sikh and the magistrate wants to blame a Muslim group for the murder of Lal, to encourage the remaining Mano Majra Muslims to leave peacefully for Pakistan. Another train of dead Sikhs arrive and the magistrate tells the superintendent to ensure that the Muslims will leave to a nearby refugee camp. The Sikhs and Muslims have lived together in Mano Majra for generations. One Muslim said, "What have we to do with Pakistan? We were born here. So were our ancestors. We have lived amongst [Sikhs] as brothers" (126). The Mano Majra Sikhs say they will look after the Muslim people's belongings as they go to the camp for a few days and tearful goodbyes are exchanged. When the cars from the Muslim commander arrive, they say the refugees can only take what they can carry, bringing up the question of their cattle and expensive belongings. The Sikh police officer in charge decides to give the role of safeguarding the belongings to Malli, who is from another village. The villagers are horrified as Malli and his friends loot all the houses.

The Sikhs begin to gather in the Gurudwara to sleep. Everyone is on edge. A young Sikh soldier and a group of armed men enter one night and aim to recruit men to kill the refugees on the train to Pakistan leaving the next night. Many of the people on the train are Muslims from Mano Majra. At first there is apprehension but the young leader appeal to emotions of the people with stories of atrocities committed against Sikhs. Iqbal, who has returned to the village and is staying at the Gurudwara, tries to convince Meet Singh (the caretaker of the Gurudwara) to influence people not to do this. Iqbal is wondering whether or not he should be a martyr for his cause but is disawayed because no one will know of his valiant effort.

The day of the planned attack arrives. The magistrate is worried because the young girl was Muslim and is on the train. The Sikh militants develop a plan to put a large steel rope 20 feet high above the tracks. This is to push off everyone on the top of the train. The plan is to also shoot at the windows to kill everyone inside the train as well.

While the militants see the train coming due to their system of flashlights to warn people ahead of the location of the train, a large man climbs one of the poles of the wire. Juggut, knowing Nooran is in one of the rail-cars, acts on instinct and hacks away at the wire. He is shot several times but tries his best to hold on and cut it apart. The train is moving so fast that the wire might cut the people on the top of train in two. He is shot and killed, sacrificing his life and saving his lover and the rest of the train to Pakistan.

== Analysis ==
=== Social structure and cultural understanding among the people about the book ===
In a relatively short book, the reader gets to know a lot of characters in detail. Examination of the varied groups of people not only increases cultural and social understanding of that time and place, but also shows that the blame could not be placed on any one group; all were responsible.

"Muslims said the Hindus had planned and started the killing. According to the Hindus, the Muslims were to blame. The fact is, both sides killed. Both shot and stabbed and speared and clubbed. Both tortured. Both raped" (1).

If groups of people are examined on a closer level than their religious attachments, a more detailed social structure emerges. Government officials were corrupt, manipulative of villagers, and could arrest anyone they chose for any reason, more often than not for their own benefit. They did just enough in terms of dealing with the dispute so that nobody could say that they did not do anything. The law enforcement was completely at the whim of the local government, meaning that in practice, there was no law. Also, small amounts of educated people trickled in and out of villages, trying to instill in people democratic, communist, or other western ideologies, though the common people were turned off and confused by their unorthodoxy. When Iqbal was speaking to a villager about freedom, the villager explained,

"Freedom is for the educated people who fought for it. We were slaves of the English, now we will be slaves of the educated Indians—or the Pakistanis" (48).

To better understand the situation surrounding the partition of India, Singh provides information about both religions involved. The book sheds light on the various religious practices of both Sikhs and Muslims in rural India. Singh describes daily life for individuals from both practices. For example, Singh describes the practice of prayer for Muslims. "The mullah at the mosque knows that it is time for the morning prayer. He has a quick wash, stands facing west towards Mecca and with his fingers in his ears cries in long sonorous notes, Allah-o-Akbar" (4). Singh points out practices of Sikhs as well, "The priest at the Sikh temple lies in bed till the mullah has called. Then he too gets up, draws a bucket of water from the well in the temple courtyard, pours it over himself, and intones his prayer in monotonous singsong to the sound of splashing water (5)"".

=== Moral message and character development ===
The story is an extract from the novel published in 1956. It talks about how partition affected a small village where people from all religions and sects once lived in harmony. More than giving the details of partition, singh has recounted what impact it had on people. In addition to giving an understanding of human actions and pointing out that everyone was responsible, Singh makes a background moral commentary which bubbles up through main characters in their thoughts and their actions. Hukum Chand is the District magistrate, and one of the main characters in the story. It becomes apparent that he is a man in moral conflict who has probably used his power over the years with much corruption. He is often described with a dirty physical appearance as if he is overwhelmed with unclean actions and sins, and is just as often trying to wash himself of them, similar to Pontius Pilate after Christ was condemned. Hukum Chand's ethical issues are shown in one of repeated encounters he has with two geckos, which likely represent Muslims and Hindus in conflict, on the verge of fighting each other. When they start fighting, they fall right next to him, and he panics. The guilt he gets from not helping when he has more than enough power to do so literally jumps onto him.

Hukum Chand felt as if he had touched the lizards and they had made his hands dirty. He rubbed his hands on the hem of his shirt. It was not the sort of dirt which could be wiped off or washed clean (24)

Alcoholism is another tool Hukum Chand uses in attempt to clean his conscience. He feels the guilt of his actions by day and relieved of them by night, when his alcohol is able to justify trysts with a teenage prostitute the same age as his deceased daughter. In all his conflictions, he is able to acknowledge that what he is doing is bad, but is still unable to promote good.

The two other main characters that are given a lot of attention are Iqbal Singh and Juggut Singh, and are likely meant to be contrasted. Iqbal is described as a slightly effeminate, well-educated and atheist social worker from Britain who thinks politically (and cynically). Juggut is a towering, muscular, and uneducated villager who places action over thought and is known for frequent arrests and gang problems. As if to warm them up for comparison, they were both arrested for the same murder they did not commit, and were placed in adjacent cells. Upon their release, they learned that a gang was planning to attack the train taking Mano Majra's Muslim population to Pakistan and kill the passengers; Juggut's Muslim lover Nooran is also supposed to be on that train. They each had the potential to save the train, though it was recognized that this may cost their lives. Juggut, nevertheless, acts on instinct and sacrifices his life to save the train. Iqbal spends pages wondering to himself whether he should do something, exposing a moral paradox on the way:

Iqbal or the learned people are less of action, while the people of Juggat's breed are less about talking.

"The bullet is neutral. It hits the good and the bad, the important and the insignificant, without distinction. If there were people to see the act of self-immolation…the sacrifice might be worth while: a moral lesson might be conveyed…the point of sacrifice…is the purpose. For the purpose, it is not enough that a thing is intrinsically good: it must be known to be good. It is not enough to know within one’s self that one is in the right" (170).

The questions of right versus wrong which Singh poses throughout the book are numerous, including those of what one should do when one has the opportunity to prevent something bad, when an act of goodwill is truly worthwhile, and how much importance is the consciousness of the bad. Train to Pakistan, with its multiple gruesome and explicit accounts of death, torture, and rape for the public to read, makes the case that people do need to know about the bad.

=== Politics ===
Khushwant Singh does not describe the politics of the Partition in much detail. This is mostly because his purpose is to bring out the individual, human element and provide a social understanding, two aspects of historical events which tend to be either ignored or not covered effectively in texts. In the Partition, the major change was political; the partition of India into a secular India and Muslim Pakistan. The effect of the change, however, was significant and as Singh has shown, frighteningly, social, as religious groups rearranged and clashed violently. Singh makes it clear that many people played a part in this chaos and everyone was equally worthy of blame, all while integrating examples of the sheer moral confusion which arises from trying to make sense of an event as momentous as the Partition.

== Characters ==
=== Iqbal Singh ===
He is a political agitator who encourages peasants to demand more political and economic rights. He identifies himself as a "comrade" which suggest that he is part of the Communist organization. Iqbal is a Sikh, given his last name and the band he wears, but does not practice the religion anymore. He is portrayed throughout the novel as Muslim. Iqbal has an affinity for English costumes and practices, "his countrymen's code of morals had always puzzled him, with his anglicized way of looking at things. The Punjabi's code was even more baffling. For them truth, honor, financial integrity were 'all right'" (41).

=== Juggut (Jugga) Singh ===
Jugga is described as a budmash, a bad man, by others but ultimately becomes a hero. One of the central protagonists and in many ways a foil to Iqbal, Jugga seeks to redeem himself over the course of the novel. He's framed for the dacoity, used as a scapegoat for the police, and abused by many in Mano Majra. But Jugga is also an honest man, and he tends to change his ways once he falls in love with Nooran. His crude language and wordplay often contradicts his inner morality: "I was out of the village . . . but was not murdering anyone. I was being murdered" (106). (I.e., "being murdered" here refers to his sexual relationship with Nooran.) He is large in frame (6 foot, 4 inches tall) and prone to violent tendencies.

=== Hukum Chand ===
Hukum Chand is the deputy commissioner in Mano Majra and has authority over the sub-inspector and the head constable. His daughter, along with other members of his family, have died, but it's not clear how. Her death deeply affects him and fuels his detached, utilitarian style of policing; he centers on saving as many lives as possible, at any cost. This includes restricting the freedom of the people to keep them safe (i.e., imprisoning Jugga and Iqbal despite knowing that they are innocent).

He is described as depressed and he is deeply marked by the violence of the Partition. For example, when Chand is reflecting on the train massacre, he focuses on his memories of the bodies: they haunt him despite his efforts to remove them from his mind. Furthermore, he is obsessed with death, viewing it as "the only absolute truth"; he is afraid that when someone dies, their existence no longer matters. When he recalls the train, he can only imagine the utter terror felt by the passengers, which manifests in a belief that life must be made as pleasurable as possible through hedonistic behaviours.

== Film adaptation ==
A movie based on this novel and having the same title Train to Pakistan was released in 1998. It was directed by Pamela Rooks and this movie was nominated in Cinequest Film Festival, 1999 in the best feature film category. Nirmal pandey, Mohan Agashe, Rajit Kapoor, Smriti Mishra, Divya Dutta, Mangal Dhillon were the main cast of this movie.

== Plays ==
A play based on this novel and having the same title "Train to Pakistan", however the first chapter "Dacoity" was staged at Lamakaan - an open cultural space in Hyderabad, India. The play was staged by a theatre group called Aami. The play was adapted and directed by Krishna Shukla. This play was staged three times, the latest being on 26 August 2014.

A Hindi play translated by Usha Mahajan, dramatized by Suman Kumar and directed by Amar Sah (Amar Nath Sah) was staged by Bela Theatre Karwaan on 29 December 2019 at Kamani Auditorium (Mandi House, Delhi), 10 January 2020 and last production on 23 January 2020. It received standing ovation on each show.

== 2006 edition ==
Roli Books in New Delhi published a new edition of the novel together with 66 of Margaret Bourke-White's photographs of the violence. In late 2006, Roli was hoping to find an international distributor for the edition at the Frankfurt Book Fair (in October, 2006).

Train to Pakistan has also been translated into Kannada (ಕನ್ನಡ) and Tamil (தமிழ்) under the same title by Dr. M B Ramamurthy and Raman Raja respectively. In 1976, it was translated into Telugu (తెలుగు) by Late Akundi Narayana Murthy. Prior to its publication in a book format, it was serialized in the then popular Telugu Magazine Krishna Patrika.

== Sources ==
1. Sengupta, Somini, "Bearing Steady Witness To Partition's Wounds," an article in the Arts section, The New York Times, 21 September 2006, pages E1, E7
2. Lance Truong, "Character Development" An excerpt from A writing assignment, St. Paul College, 16 September 2006
