= Sandeep Patil =

Indian cricketer

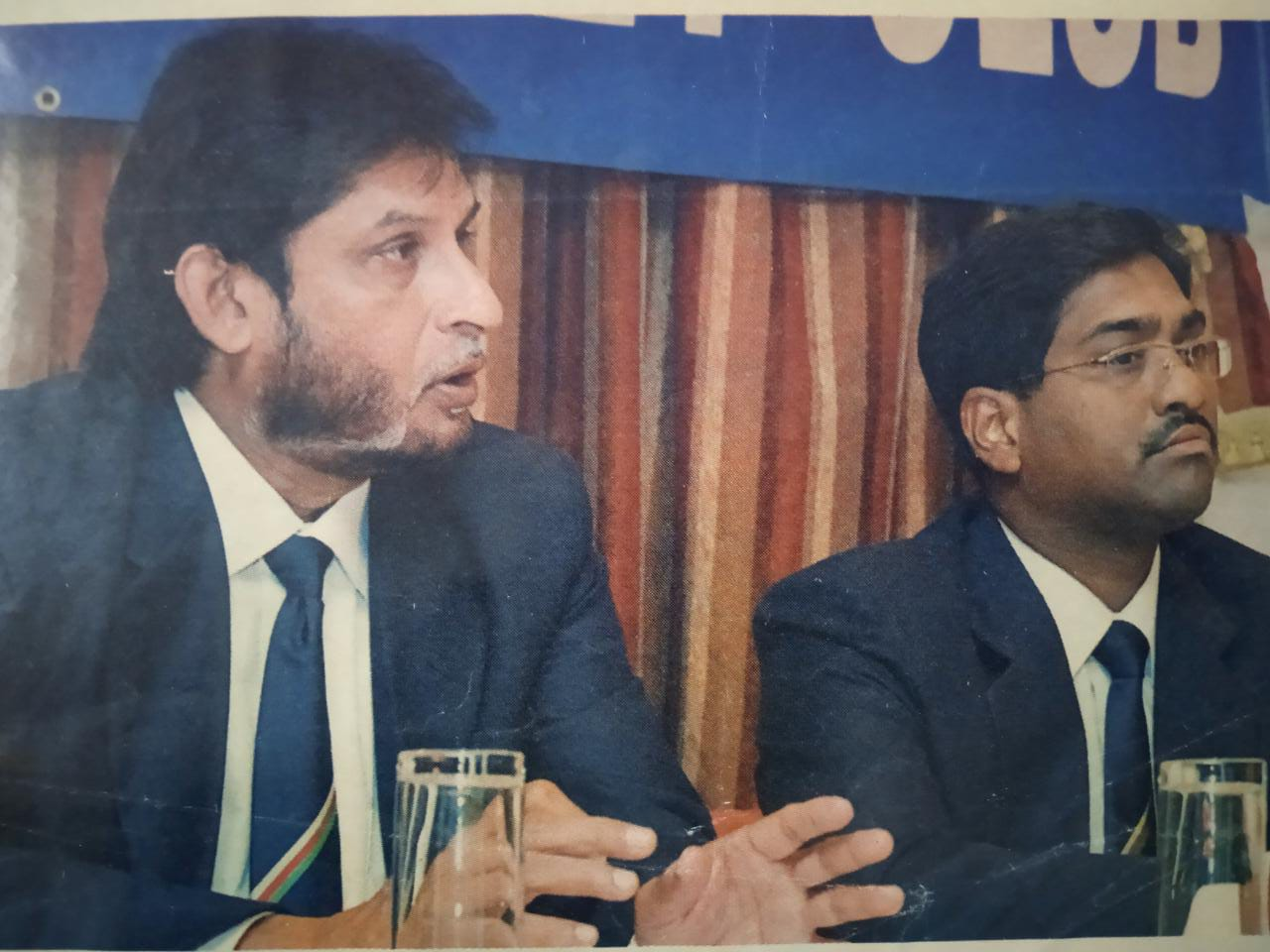
- Sandeep Patil with Jitendra Redkar

Personal information
- Full name: Sandeep Madhusudan Patil
- Born: 18 August 1956 (age 70); Bombay, Bombay State, India
- Batting: Right-handed
- Bowling: Right-arm medium
- Relatives: Deepa Patil (m. 1984)

International information
- National side: India (1980-1986)
- Test debut (cap 149): 15 January 1980 v Pakistan
- Last Test: 12 December 1984 v England
- ODI debut (cap 32): 6 December 1980 v Australia
- Last ODI: 26 May 1986 v England

Career statistics
Competition	Test	ODI
Matches	29	45
Runs scored	1,588	1,005
Batting average	36.93	24.51
100s/50s	4/7	0/9
Top score	174	84
Balls bowled	645	864
Wickets	9	15
Bowling average	26.66	39.26
5 wickets in innings	0	0
10 wickets in match	0	0
Best bowling	2/28	2/28
Catches/stumpings	12/–	11/–
Medal record
Men's Cricket
Representing India
ICC Cricket World Cup
Winner	1983 England and Wales
ACC Asia Cup
Winner	1984 United Arab Emirates
- Source: ESPNCricinfo, 4 February 2006

Sandeep Patil (born 18 August 1956) is an Indian former cricketer, India national age-group cricket manager and former Kenya national team coach, who guided the underdogs to the semi-finals of the 2003 World Cup. He was a hard-hitting middle order batsman and an occasional medium pace bowler. Patil was a member of the Indian team that won the 1983 Cricket World Cup and the 1984 Asia Cup. He was the coach of Mumbai Champs in the Indian Cricket League, but returned to the mainstream when he cut ties with the unofficial league in 2009. He later served as the director of the National Cricket Academy (NCA) and as the chief of the BCCI Selection Committee.

== Early life ==
Sandeep Patil was born on 18 August 1956 in Mumbai. His father, Madhusudan Patil, was a former first-class cricketer, national level badminton player and skilled player of tennis and football. He grew up in the Shivaji Park area in Bombay, studied in Balmohan Vidyamandir and Ramnarain Ruia College and was coached by Ankush 'Anna' Vaidya.

== Cricket career ==
In the early part of his career, Patil was as much a medium pacer who bowled off the wrong foot, as he was a batsman. Following three successful years for the Bombay university in the Rohinton Baria Trophy, he made the Bombay Ranji team in 1975–76. After being on and off the team for three seasons, he played his first major innings against Delhi in the 1979 semifinal. Going in at No.6 after Bombay lost the first four wickets for 72, Patil hit 145 in 276 minutes with 18 fours and a six, none of his partners made more than 25. Patil played for Edmonton in the Middlesex league in 1979 and 1980, and for Somerset 'B' in the latter year.

Australia and Pakistan visited India in 1979–80. Patil appeared in tour matches for West Zone against both teams, scoring 44 and 23 against Australia, and 68 and 71 against Pakistan. This earned him the selection in the last two Test matches against Pakistan. A week before making the debut, he made his career-best first class score against Saurashtra at the Wankhede Stadium. Coming in to bat in the second morning he was 45* at lunch, reached his hundred in 139 balls scoring 105 in the second session, and ended up with 210 made in 205 balls with seven sixes and nineteen fours. The last of the sixes cleared the stadium (a very rare feat at the Wankhede) and landed in the hockey grounds outside. Patil made 62 in the final Test at Calcutta, appeared in the Golden Jubilee Test against England later in the season and was selected for the tour of Australia in 1980–81.

In the early matches of the Australian tour, he scored 116 against South Australia, which included Rodney Hogg, and 60 and 97 against Queensland which had Jeff Thomson, Geoff Dymock and Carl Rackemann. He won the man of the match on his ODI debut for a 64 against Australia.

In the first innings of the first Test at Sydney Patil had reached 65 when just before the tea break on the first day, he was hit on the throat by Hogg. Continuing without a helmet, he was hit over the right ear by a bouncer by Len Pascoe in the first over after tea. Patil collapsed in the crease and had to retire hurt. Though still unwell, he batted in the second innings at the insistence of captain Sunil Gavaskar as India struggled to avoid an innings defeat.

Two weeks later, with a helmet on, Patil hit a spectacular 174 in the Adelaide Test. It came after India lost the first four wickets for 130 against the Australian total of 528. At the time, the highest score in an innings by an Indian in Australia, it took him just over five hours and included 22 fours and a six over mid-wicket off Bruce Yardley. In the next series against New Zealand, Patil opened the bowling for India along with Kapil Dev in the Auckland Test.

Patil found himself out of the team after four Tests in the home series against England in 1981–82 but was picked for the away series that followed immediately after. Here in the Manchester Test he scored his second hundred. India was in some danger of following on when he added 96 runs with Kapil Dev a little over an hour. England took the second new ball soon after and Patil hit the last two balls of an over from Ian Botham for four and three. In the next over he hit Bob Willis for six fours (4440444, the third ball being a no ball) – "two cover drives, one flat batted back over the bowler's head, two square cuts of ferocious power and a mighty hook" - taking his score from 73 to 104 in nine balls. He was 129 not out when rain brought an early end to the match.

Another hundred followed against Sri Lanka in September but he was again out the team by the middle of the season. While the Indian team toured West Indies, he scored 121* in 84 balls in the second innings of the Ranji final against Karnataka. All his runs came in single session on the final day as Bombay was targeting a declaration. Patil scored 216 runs in eight matches in the Prudential World Cup including 51* in the semifinal against England. He scored 609 runs in the 1983–84 Ranji season, and his fourth and last Test hundred against Pakistan at Faisalabad.

On the last day of the Delhi Test against England in December 1984, with his score on 41, Patil was caught at long on attempting a big hit off the bowling of Phil Edmonds. It triggered a collapse and India lost the match that could well have been saved. Patil was dropped in the next test at Kolkata as a disciplinary measure, along with Kapil Dev who also fell to a similar shot off the bowling of Pat Pocock. Mohammad Azharuddin who took his place scored hundreds in his first three Test matches and Patil played no more Test cricket. In 1986, he was recalled for a few more one day matches. He also toured England without appearing in Tests.

Patil announced his retirement from first class cricket after appearing for Bombay against the Australians in September 1986. But he came back to captain the Madhya Pradesh cricket team from 1988 to 1993 with considerable success. One of the more notable innings was a 185 against Bombay in 1990. He went on to coach the India national team and the 'A' team. As the coach of Kenya, he guided them to an unlikely semifinal place in the 2003 World Cup.

He served as chairman of selectors of the Board of Control for Cricket in India from 27 September 2012 to September 2016.

== Bollywood debut ==
Soon after the 1983 Cricket World Cup victory, Patil was offered by Vijay Singh to play the lead opposite two Bollywood actresses Poonam Dhillon and Debashree Roy in Kabhie Ajnabi The, while Syed Kirmani was offered to essay the role of the antagonist. Reportedly Patil got so occupied with his Bollywood debut that he refused to participate in the West Indies tour in 1983. Though the cricketer later reasoned that he had opted out of that tour because he was nursing an injury at that time. The filming began in 1983 and the film was released in 1985. The film was highly publicised on the fighting sequence between Patil and Kirmani as well as his chemistry with Debashree Roy, especially in the song sequence Geet Mere Hothon Ko Dey Gaya Koi. It opened with 80% seat occupancy but ultimately became a major debacle at the box office.

"Sandeep Patil ended up coaching neither Poonam Dhillon nor Debashree Roy on the sets of Kabhi Ajnabi The. Where Sandeep tarried far too long about being a Debashreeman, Miss Roy went on to become a captive star sought by Bengal's topmost cineaste directors. While Poonam, right now, is making telewaves as the heartbeat of NDTV-India's Abhigyan Prakash. Wasn't it Kapil Dev who remarked, as he saw the Patil Boy act dashed awkward in Kabhi Ajnabi The, that Sandeep was as slow in going for Debashree-Poonam as he was in going for the high ball in the field?”

— Sportstar

ESPN wrote on his performance, "he even aces the love-struck Hindi film hero's signature move of producing notes from a guitar without moving either hand". Sportstar commented on his performance that he acted "dashed awkward" in the film. The Tribune wrote, "In contrast to their heroics in the 1983 World Cup, Patil and Kirmani were clean bowled on the big screen".

== Editing career ==
Patil edited Marathi sports magazine Ekach Shatkar which was, once a top selling sports magazine in Maharashtra. It outsold Sportstar and was often considered as the last nail in the coffin of Sportsweek. The largest selling newspaper Mahanagar was also started in his garage.

== Personal life ==
In 1983, Patil was married when he met Debashree Roy on the set of Kabhie Ajnabi The (1985) and reportedly had an affair with her. Indian media interpreted their affair as the sole reason for the failure of his first marriage. Reportedly, soon after the release of the film they discontinued their relationship and never publicly discussed anything on their separation. He later married Deepa. He has two sons, Chirag Patil and Prateek Patil. He wrote his autobiography Sandy Storm in 1984.

== In popular culture ==
Chirag Patil, Patil's elder son portrayed him in Kabir Khan's 83 (2021) which also stars Ranveer Singh as Kapil Dev.

== Sources ==
- Sujit Mukherjee, Matched winners, Orient Longman (1996)
- Sandeep Patil, Sandy Storm, Rupa & Co (1984)
- Benson & Hedges Cricket Year, 1981–82

Preceded by Ajit Wadekar	India National Cricket Manager; March 1996 – September 1996	Succeeded by Madan Lal
