= Train to Pakistan (film) =

- Directed by: Pamela Rooks
- Screenplay by: Pamela Rooks
- Based on: Train to Pakistan by Khushwant Singh
- Produced by: R. V. Pandit; Ravi Gupta; Bobby Bedi
- Starring: Nirmal Pandey; Rajit Kapur; Mohan Agashe; Smriti Mishra
- Cinematography: Sunny Joseph
- Edited by: A. V. Narayana; Sujata Narula
- Music by: Piyush Kanojia; Taufiq Qureshi; Kuldeep Singh
- Release date: 6 November 1998
- Running time: 108 minutes
- Country: India
- Language: Hindi

Train to Pakistan is a 1998 Indian Hindi film adapted from Khushwant Singh's 1956 novel by the same name set in the Partition of India of 1947 and directed by Pamela Rooks. The film stars Nirmal Pandey, Rajit Kapur, Mohan Agashe, Smriti Mishra, Mangal Dhillon and Divya Dutta.

== Plot ==
The film is set in Mano Majra, which is a quiet fictional village on the border of India and Pakistan, close to where the railway line crosses the Sutlej River. The film develops around the love affair of small-time dacoit Juggut Singh (Nirmal Pandey), with a local Muslim girl, Nooran (Smriti Mishra). Mano Majra, incidentally, was the original title of the book upon its release in 1956. The villagers are a mix of Sikhs and Muslims, who live in harmony. The Sikhs own most of the land, and the Muslims work as labourers. During the summer of 1947, when the Partition of India was taking place, the entire country was a hotbed of extremism and intolerance. The Muslims in India moved towards the newly formed Pakistan, and the Hindus and Sikhs in Pakistan migrated to refugee camps in India. One day, a train arrives from Pakistan, which carries bodies of all the Sikh and Hindu children, Women and Men who have been butchered while they tried to depart from Pakistan. That is when this quiet village is changed forever.

== Cast ==
- Mohan Agashe as Hukum Chand
- Nirmal Pandey as Jaggat Singh, Jagaa
- Rajit Kapoor as Iqbal
- Smriti Mishra as Nooran
- Divya Dutta as Haseena, the Muslim prostitute girl
- Mangal Dhillon as the sub-inspector

== Development ==
The film was one of the most anticipated adaptations of its time, especially being writer Khushwant Singh's most acclaimed work. According to him, several people in past have attempted to make the film, including Shashi Kapoor and Shabana Azmi, who even developed a screenplay, but owing to the sensitivity of the subject, they abandoned the project.

Pamela Rooks first read the novel at 17, preparing for the title role of Nooran, which she was set to play in the prospective Ismail Merchant film, which never took off. The novel stayed with her, however, because growing up she had stories of the Partition from her parents. Initially the publishers of the book, Ravi Dayal, were hesitant to give the rights of the work to a new filmmaker, as this was only Rooks' second feature, till Ravi Gupta, Managing Director of NFDC stepped in and a go-ahead was given. Previously as her first feature, Rooks had adapted her own novel Miss Beatty's Children, into a 1993 film by the same name, which won her the National Film Award for Best First Film of a Director. For her adaptation, Rooks chose a slightly different narrative from the original novel. Thus, the film begins with Hukum Chand, the District Magistrate, reminiscing about the partition period. However, she has visually translated most of the lines from Khushwant Singh's narrative directly on to the screen.

== Production ==
The film was produced by Channel Four Films and National Film Development Corporation of India (NFDC), and the production company was Kaleidoscope Entertainment. The shooting began nearly fifty years after the actual partition of India in 1947. Though many villages of Punjab resembled the Punjab of fifty years prior, Muslim pockets were missing now, hence a couple of villages on the fringes of Punjab were used to give a combined look of Mano Majra, the village near the Indo-Pak border, where the novel was set. Pamela used her background in the documentary film, making to shoot certain parts of the film live, in scenes like that of religious ceremony at a temple, the feel couldn't have been recreated though retakes were shot live. The shooting was finally completed by July 1997, when the film went into post-production work in Mumbai, ahead of its 15 August, television premiere on STAR Plus.

== Release and critical reception ==
Initially, the film was to have its premiere on STAR Plus channel on 15 August 1997, India's Independence day, but it ran into trouble with the Indian Censor Board, thus its theatrical release was also cancelled twice, and with director not agreeing to the cuts demanded by the board, the film went to a tribunal, which caused further delays. Eventually it was passed in December 1997 with a few cuts, mostly audio. Its television released happened on Star Plus in 1998, after its theatrical release. The film version had only one visual and few audio cuts. Subsequently, the film was released in the United States, Sri Lanka and on Channel Four in the UK, and also shown in several international film festivals, including, Zanzibar International Film Festival, 1998, World Film Festival National Films from South Festival Denmark, 1998, Beirut International Film Festival, 1998, Fiminale International Film Festival, Koln Germany, 1998, Soria Mora Film Festival, Oslo, 1998, and Indian Film Week in Hong Kong, 2000. Besides critical acclaim, it was also nominated for Best Film at the 1999 Cinequest Film Festival.
