= Thierry Klemeniuk =

French film producer

- Born: July 13, 1969 (age 57); Paris, France
- Occupation: Public Relations
- Spouse: Gabriella Wright (m. 2005 divorced in 2010 )

Thierry Klemeniuk (born July 13, 1969) is a French film producer and events producer, founder and former manager of the restaurant-club Man-Ray in Paris alongside Johnny Depp, Mick Hucknall, Sean Penn and John Malkovich, as well as artistic director of Man Ray, New York and producer of the Man Ray soundtrack. From 1993 to 1995, he was the Executive Manager of the famous Le Bains Douches nightclub. In 2010, Klemeniuk refocused his career, developing projects including the Entertainment Pact, an initiative to reduce the environmental impact of digital.

== Production ==
Klemeniuk is known for producing Bully (2001), Spun (2002) and Mary (2005). Klemeniuk worked alongside actors including Jack Nicholson, Adrien Brody, Sean Penn, among others on the movie and music scene. Currently, he lives between Paris and Los Angeles. His company, Klemeniuk Inc, advises companies including French AI specialist NamR. and Tech for Good projects such as the Entertainment Pact.

== Personal life ==
In 2005, Klemeniuk married the actress Gabriella Wright. They divorced in 2011.
