= Dance Like a Man =

- DVD cover
- Directed by: Pamela Rooks
- Based on: Dance Like a Man by Mahesh Dattani
- Produced by: NFDC; Rooks A. V.
- Starring: Shobana; Arif Zakaria; Anoushka Shankar
- Cinematography: Sunny Joseph
- Edited by: Bina
- Music by: Ganesh–Kumaresh
- Release date: 1 May 2004
- Country: India
- Language: English

Dance Like a Man is a 2004 Indian English-language dance drama film directed by Pamela Rooks based on the play of the same name by Mahesh Dattani. The film stars Shobana, Arif Zakaria and Anoushka Shankar in her acting debut. The film won the National Film Award for Best Feature Film in English.

== Cast ==
- Shobana as Ratna
- Arif Zakaria as Jairaj Parekh
- Anoushka Shankar as Lata
- Mohan Agashe as Amritlal Parekh
- Samir Soni as Vishal
- Vijay Crishna as the older Jairaj Parekh

== Production ==
Shobana and Anoushka Shankar were cast in the film due to their expertise in Bharatanatyam. After liking Arif Zakaria's performance as a eunuch in Darmiyaan (1997), he was cast in this film and underwent training in Bharatanatyam. The film was shot in Bangalore akin to the play. Shobana didn't watch the play because she didn't want to be influenced by it.

== Reception ==
=== Critical response ===
Film critic Subhash K. Jha wrote that "Unlike Mahesh Dattani, who has deliberately denuded his film Morning Raga of the theatrical element, Pamela Rooks seems to revel in the staginess of the original material". A critic from Rediff.com and wrote that "Dance Like A Man can be lauded for trying, though it could have done much better to rise above the bookishness that often hampers the script". Reviewing the film at its Chennai screening in October 2004, a critic from The Hindu wrote that "On the whole the story and the time zones lend themselves to visual poetry at times eventhoughthe dialogue is painfully studied. The director uses the past and present in alternating sequences to tell the story, and the visual imagery contrasts and merges with the narration. Adding mood to the striking frames is the classically tuned background score by Ganesh-Kumaresh, which heightens the sense of time and ambience in an artiste's environment. But this is the kind of film that will attract only a niche audience".
