= Smriti Mishra =

Indian actress

- Born: Varanasi
- Occupation: Actress
- Years active: 1996–2009

Smriti Mishra is an Indian actress, best known for her roles in Vijay Singh's Jaya Ganga (1996), Shyam Benegal's Sardari Begum (1996), Sudhir Mishra's Is Raat Ki Subah Nahin (1996), and Pamela Rooks's Train to Pakistan (1998).

== Career ==
Hailing from, Benares, Uttar Pradesh Smriti Mishra, who was a kathak exponent made her cinema debut at the age of 23, through the film Jaya Ganga (1996). Critically acclaimed, the film was showcased at several film festivals across the world. Her next film, Sardari Begum (1996) won Best Feature Film in Urdu at the 44th National Film Awards. Her other release in the same year Is Raat Ki Subah Nahin (1996), featured in Avijit Ghosh's book, "40 Retakes: Bollywood Classics You May Have Missed". The film won numerous awards.

She appeared in Train to Pakistan (1998), met with critical acclaim and was released in various film festivals outside India. She played the role of Sardari Begum in Zubeidaa (2001). In the 2002 documentary film India: Kingdom of the Tiger (2002), she appeared as an Indian woman who assists Jim Corbett played by Christopher Heyerdahl. She then appeared in the Indo-French film One Dollar Curry (2004). This was her second film directed by Vijay Singh. 2005 release, Kal: Yesterday and Tomorrow (2005) screened at Osian's Cinefan Festival of Asian Cinema.

She then acted in Mitsein directed by Los Angeles-based-Indian born Aparna Malladi, which is about Moksha, a young woman who leaves India for the US after an arranged marriage. The film was screened at the International premiere at the 11th Mumbai International Film Festival, India. The film was also the official selection for the 2010 Beloit International Film Festival in Wisconsin.

== Filmography ==
Year	Film	Role	Language	Notes	Ref
1996	Jaya Ganga	Zehra	Hindi	Debut	
1996	Sardari Begum	Young Sardari Begum	Urdu		
1996	Is Raat Ki Subah Nahin	Malvika	Hindi		
1998	Train to Pakistan	Nooran	Hindi		
2001	Zubeidaa	Sardari Begum	Hindu		
2002	India: Kingdom of the Tiger	Indian Woman	Hindi/English	Documentary Film	
2004	One Dollar Curry	Yamini	Hindi/English/Punjabi/French		
2005	Kal: Yesterday and Tomorrow	Maya Jalan	Hindi		
2007	Dil Dosti Etc	Vaishali	Hindi		
2009	Mitsein	Moksha	English		
