= The Convent (2018 film) =

- Film poster
- Directed by: Paul Hyett
- Written by: Paul Hyett and Conal Palmer
- Story by: Gregory Blair
- Produced by: Michael Riley Marcia Do Vales
- Starring: Michael Ironside; Rosie Day; Hannah Arterton
- Cinematography: Neil Oseman
- Music by: Paul E. Francis
- Production companies: Templeheart Films; EnMar Productions; Sterling Pictures; BCSM Enterprises Red Rock Entertainment
- Release date: 2018
- Country: United Kingdom
- Language: English

The Convent (also known and Heretiks) is a 2018 British horror film written by Paul Hyett and Conal Palmer, and directed by Hyett. The pair previously collaborated on the 2012 film The Seasoning House.

== Synopsis ==
During the 17th century, a young woman, Persephone, is saved from execution and led to a priory to repent her sins but discovers a greater evil lies within.

== Cast ==
- Michael Ironside as The Magistrate
- Rosie Day as Sister Emeline
- Hannah Arterton as Persephone
- Dilan Gwyn as Alice Langley
- Clare Higgins as Reverend Mother
- Ciaran McMenamin as William Carpenter
- Ryan Oliva as The Diabolical
- Sian Breckin as Sister Lucilla
- Katie Sheridan as Sister Margaret
- Carl Wharton as Farmer
- Grahame Fox as Jeremiah
- Petra Bryant as Agnes
- Ania Marson as Sister Elizabeth
- Sarah Malin as Sister Anna Frances
- Emily Tucker as Catherine
- Bethan Walker as Sister Bernadine
- Amelia Bennett as Sister Adela
- Freddy Carter as Ellis
- Ayvianna Snow as Sister Lillith
- Jill Buchanan as Guinevere
- Carl Wharton as Farmer
- Colin Burt Vidler as Constable
- Eva Morgan as Sister Constance

== Reception ==
Along with The Nun and St. Agatha, The Convent is regarded as a part of " the new wave of nunsploitation sweeping the horror genre".
