= Bandit Queen =

1994 film by Shekhar Kapur

- Film poster
- Directed by: Shekhar Kapur
- Written by: Mala Sen
- Based on: India's Bandit Queen: The True Story of Phoolan Devi by Mala Sen
- Produced by: Bobby Bedi
- Starring: Seema Biswas; Nirmal Pandey
- Cinematography: Ashok Mehta
- Edited by: Renu Saluja
- Music by: Nusrat Fateh Ali Khan
- Production companies: Kaleidoscope Entertainment; Film Four International
- Distributed by: Amitabh Bachchan Corporation
- Release date: 26 January 1994
- Running time: 119 minutes
- Country: India
- Language: Hindi
- Budget: ₹32.5 million
- Box office: est. ₹221 million (see below)

Bandit Queen is a 1994 Indian Hindi-language biographical action-adventure film based on the life of Phoolan Devi as covered in the book India's Bandit Queen: The True Story of Phoolan Devi by the Indian author Mala Sen. It was directed by Shekhar Kapur and starred Seema Biswas as the title character. The music was composed by Ustad Nusrat Fateh Ali Khan. The film won the National Film Award for Best Feature Film in Hindi, Filmfare Critics Award for Best Movie, and Best Direction for that year. The film premiered in the Directors' Fortnight section of the 1994 Cannes Film Festival, and was screened at the Edinburgh Film Festival. The film was selected as the Indian entry for the Best Foreign Language Film at the 67th Academy Awards, but was not accepted as a nominee.

The film was initially subjected to over 100 cuts involving adult language, rape scenes and frontal nudity by the CBFC but was overturned upon appealing to the FCAT, which upheld that the rape scenes was intended to create revulsion and claimed that "to delete or even to reduce these climactic visuals would be a sacrilege (as it would) negate the very impact of the film" and allowed depiction of nudity as it considered as not obscene. The FCAT ruling was challenged in the Supreme court which upheld FCAT decision and emphasized importance of watching movies in its context, cautioned against applying blanket standards regarding nudity and allowing film-making liberty.

== Plot ==
The film opens in the summer of 1968 in a small village in Uttar Pradesh. Phoolan is married to a twenty-something-year-old man called Puttilal (Aditya Shrivastava). Though child marriages were customary during that time, Phoolan's mother Moola (Savitri Raekwar) objects to the timing of the match. Phoolan's aging father Devideen (Ram Charan Nirmalker), conforming to his culture, disagrees, and Phoolan is sent off with Puttilal.

Phoolan is exposed to some sexual and exploitative abuses, including the caste system. (Phoolan's family, as well as Puttilal's family, belong to the lower-ranked Mallah sub-caste; the higher-ranked Thakur caste takes the lead in social and political situations.) Puttilal is physically and sexually abusive, and Phoolan eventually runs away and returns home. As Phoolan grows older, she faces incidents of (non-consensual) fondling and groping from the Thakur men (whose parents make up the panchayat or village government). At the next town meeting, the panchayat wields their patriarchal authority to banish Phoolan from the village, since she will not consent to the sexual advances of the higher caste males.

Accordingly, Phoolan lives with her cousin Kailash (Saurabh Shukla). En route to another village, she encounters a troop of dakus (bandits) of the Babu Gujjar gang, led by Vikram Mallah Mastana (Nirmal Pandey). Phoolan stays with Kailash for a while but is eventually compelled to leave. Angry and hopeless, Phoolan goes to the local police to try to have her ban lifted, but she is beaten, molested, and arrested by policemen, who rape her in custody. The Thakurs put up bail and have her released. But, unknown to her, the bail is a bribe (paid, through the police, to Babu Gujjar's gang), and Babu Gujjar arrives to collect his prize.

In May 1979, Phoolan is abducted by Babu Gujjar (Anirudh Agarwal). Gujjar is a physically imposing man and a ruthless, predatory mercenary. Although Gujjar's lieutenant Vikram is sympathetic towards Phoolan, Gujjar indiscriminately brutalizes and humiliates her, until one day Vikram catches him raping her and shoots him in the head. Vikram takes over the gang, and his empathy for Phoolan eventually grows into a relationship.

All goes well until Thakur Shri Ram (Govind Namdeo) is released from prison. Thakur Shri Ram is the real gang leader (boss of the erstwhile Gujjar). Shri Ram returns to his gang and while Vikram receives him with respect, Shri Ram bristles at Vikram's egalitarian leadership style and covets Phoolan. Around this time, Phoolan revisits her former husband Puttilal, and with Vikram's help, abducts him and exacts her justice for his rape and abuse, beating him up. She shares her closure with Vikram.

In August 1980, Shri Ram arranges to have Vikram assassinated, and abducts Phoolan, bringing her to the village of Behmai. Phoolan is repeatedly raped and beaten by Shri Ram and by the rest of the gang members, as punishment for her "disrespect" for his previous advances, and for her audacity at being equal. The final humiliation and punishment is that she is stripped naked, paraded around Behmai, beaten, and sent to fetch water from the well (in full view of the village).

A severely traumatized Phoolan returns to her cousin Kailash. She recovers gradually and seeks out Man Singh (Manoj Bajpai), an old friend of Vikram Mallah. Man Singh brings her to another large gang, led by Baba Mustakim (Rajesh Vivek). She relates her history to Baba and asks him for some men and weapons to form a gang. Baba Mustakim agrees, and Man Singh and Phoolan become the leaders of the new gang.

Phoolan leads her new gang with courage, generosity, humility, and shrewdness. Her stock and her legend grow. She becomes known as Phoolan Devi, the bandit queen. In February 1981, Baba Mustakim informs her of a large wedding in Behmai, with Thakur Shri Ram in attendance. As Phoolan departs, Baba Mustakim warns her to remain low-key. Phoolan attacks the wedding party, and her gang exacts revenge on the entire Thakur clan of Behmai. They round up the men and beat them up. Many of the men are finally shot. This act of vengeance brings her to the attention of the national law enforcement authorities (in New Delhi). The top police officials now begin a massive manhunt for Phoolan, and Thakur Shri Ram relishes the opportunity to come to their aid.

The manhunt claims many lives in Phoolan's gang. They are ultimately forced to hide out in the rugged ravines of Chambal without any food or water. Phoolan evaluates her options and decides to surrender. Her terms are to have her remaining mates protected and provided for. The film ends with Phoolan's surrender in February 1983. The end credits indicate that all the charges against her were withdrawn (including the charges of murder at Behmai), and that she was released in 1994.

== Cast ==
- Seema Biswas as Phoolan Devi
- Nirmal Pandey as Vikram Mallah
- Aditya Srivastava as Puttilal
- Gajraj Rao as Ashok Chand Thakur (Sarpanch's son)
- Saurabh Shukla as Kailash
- Manoj Bajpayee as Maan Singh
- Raghuvir Yadav as Madho
- Rajesh Vivek as Baba Mustakim
- Anirudh Agarwal as Babu Gujjar
- Govind Namdev as Thakur Shri Ram
- Jeetu Shastri as Bharat
- Shekhar Kapur as a Lorry driver (cameo appearance)

== Soundtrack ==
Bandit Queen

Film score by Nusrat Fateh Ali Khan
- Released: 1995
- Genres: Filmi, Hindustani classical
- Length: 1:16:00
- Labels: Oriental Star Agencies; Big B Music
- Producer: Roger White

The film's music was composed by Nusrat Fateh Ali Khan, with Khan also voicing non-instrumental pieces in the soundtrack which includes tracks based on traditional Rajasthani music.

Bandit Queen
No.	Title	Length
1.	"Sanware Tore Bin Jiya"	6:55
2.	"Sajna Tere Bina"	6:53
3.	"More Saiyaan To Hai Pardes"	8:01
4.	"Welcome Phoolan"	0:48
5.	"Opening"	1:56
6.	"Out of Water, Into Marriage"	0:53
7.	"Child Bride"	3:08
8.	"Child Rape"	3:07
9.	"Phoolan & Vikram Eye to Eye"	1:28
10.	"What I Am Here For"	3:25
11.	"City Love Making"	1:48
12.	"Washing At the River Bank"	1:17
13.	"Village Court"	1:36
14.	"Re-Opening"	1:18
15.	"Into the Hills"	1:21
16.	"The Quiet"	1:44
17.	"The Passion"	2:48
18.	"Chottie See"	1:14
19.	"Re-Opening By the River"	1:52
20.	"Chottie See 2"	3:54
21.	"Phoolan's Revenge"	2:32
22.	"Hillside Drums"	1:16
23.	"Death to the Bandit"	0:42
24.	"Red Bandana"	1:22
25.	"Janmanchpur"	1:33
26.	"Preparation"	5:08
27.	"Behmai"	1:19
28.	"Funeral Pyres"	1:56
29.	"The Surrender of Phoolan"	4:52
Total length:		1:16:00

== Release ==
=== Box office ===
In India, the film grossed ₹206.7 million ($5,833,545). In the United States and Canada, the film grossed $399,748 (₹14,164,271). Combined, the film grossed approximately ₹221 million ($6.23 million) worldwide.

=== Controversy ===
Although Phoolan Devi is a heroine in the film, she fiercely disputed its accuracy and fought to get it banned in India. She even threatened to immolate herself outside a theater if the film were not withdrawn. Eventually, she withdrew her objections after the producer Channel 4 paid her £40,000. Author-activist Arundhati Roy in her film review entitled, "The Great Indian Rape Trick", questioned the right to "restage the rape of a living woman without her permission", and charged Shekhar Kapur with exploiting Phoolan Devi and misrepresenting both her life and its meaning.

=== Critical reception ===
The film has a Rotten Tomatoes approval rating of 97% based on 29 reviews, with an average score of 7.6/10. The website's critics consensus reads, "Brimming with bravura spectacle and an arresting turn by Seema Biswas, The Bandit Queen is a galvanizing ode to rebellion." Jonathan Rosenbaum called it "an eye-filling and often stirring movie", writing that at "its best, this recalls radical third-world 'westerns' like Glauber Rocha's Antonio das Mortes as well as Kenji Mizoguchi's films about men's inhumanity to women." He writes, however, that the film "despite its ambition, bracing anger, and visual panache ... remains many notches below such reference points because of its sensationalistic and fairly indiscriminate piling on of horrors and violence, which ultimately becomes pornographic. The issue isn't what actually happened to Phoolan Devi ... The issue is the film's tendency to desensitize us with a surfeit of details." James Berardinelli gave the film 3.5 stars out of 4, writing that the "picture of human indignity and suffering painted by Bandit Queen is on par with that of Schindler's List. As the Nazis treated the Jews like animals, so too do the upper caste Indians regard those born into poverty and squalor." "Tightly-paced, powerfully-written, and well-acted", he writes, "Bandit Queen is a first-rate adventure movie." Edward Guthmann of San Francisco Chronicle gave the film 3 stars out of 4 and described it as a "handsome, impassioned film" and praised Biswas' performance, calling it "fireball of unrelenting, white-hot fury -- a slap in the face to her country and its barbaric, outdated treatment of women." He notes that the film "makes no pretense of objectivity. Kapur clearly is outraged by the gender and caste biases of his country". This lack of objectivity is countered by Richard Corliss, who called it an "exciting movie that brings Devi's story to life with passion but without passing judgment." Reviewing the film at the Indian Panorama section of the International Film Festival of India, S. R. Ashok Kumar of The Hindu wrote that "The director has woven the screenplay in such a way that not a single minute is dull. The camera by Ahok Mehta has moved with ease in the jungle and actors Saurav Shukla, Rajesh Vivek have done their best. Seema Biswas as Phoolan Devi has given a subtle performance".

== Awards ==
39th Valladolid International Film Festival:

Nominated

- Golden Spike for Best Feature Film – Shekhar Kapur

43rd National Film Awards:

- Best Feature Film in Hindi – Kaleidoscope Entertainment
- Best Actress – Seema Biswas
- Best Costume Design – Dolly Ahluwalia

40th Filmfare Awards:

Won

- Best Film (Critics) – Shekhar Kapur

42nd Filmfare Awards:

- Best Director – Shekhar Kapur
- Best Female Debut – Seema Biswas
- Best Cinematography – Ashok Mehta

Nominated

- Best Film – Kaleidoscope Entertainment
- Best Actress – Seema Biswas

== See also ==
- List of films with a 100% rating on Rotten Tomatoes
- List of Indian submissions for the Academy Award for Best International Feature Film
- List of submissions to the 67th Academy Awards for Best Foreign Language Film
- Phoolan Devi (1985 film)
