= Dubai (2001 film) =

- Directed by: Joshiy
- Written by: Renji Panicker
- Produced by: Preethi B. Menon
- Starring: Mammootty; Biju Menon; Vijayakumar; N. F. Varghese; Anjala Zaveri; Nirmal Pandey
- Cinematography: Sanjeev Shankar
- Edited by: K. Sankunni
- Music by: Songs: Vidyasagar; Background score: S. P. Venkatesh
- Production company: Anugraha Combines
- Release date: 19 October 2001
- Running time: 206 minutes; 170 minutes (edited version)
- Country: India
- Language: Malayalam
- Budget: est. ₹5 crore

Dubai is a 2001 Indian Malayalam-language political action film directed by Joshiy starring Mammootty, Biju Menon, Vijayakumar, N. F. Varghese, Anjala Zaveri and Nirmal Pandey. Cochin Haneefa, Janardhanan, Nedumudi Venu and Preetha Vijayakumar play supporting roles. The script for the film was written by Renji Panicker. It is one of the Malayalam movies with a long duration. It received negative reviews from the critics and was a failure at the box office.

Barring a few scenes in the beginning, the film was completely shot in the United Arab Emirates. It was one of the most-expensive films made in Malayalam cinema at that time. The film ended up being the biggest loss-maker in Malayalam cinema at the time. The film's failure is attributed to insufficient marketing and the several delays in its release.

== Plot ==
In 1989, Major Ravi Mammen is brought to interrogate two arrested LTTE terrorists in Bangalore, who are on a mission to assassinate the Indian Prime Minister on his visit to the city - later identified as professional assassins with no ties with any organisation. On the run, he identifies the Union Home Minister, K. J. Nair as the main conspirator behind the assassination plot. Nair anticipates a political coup after the death of the Prime Minister, through which he hopes to seize power. However, Mammen attempts to foil his ambition. Nair tries to buy out Mammen, who refuses his offers. In an attempt to capture Nair and unravel the conspiracy, Mammen shoots at Nair, but the bullet accidentally hits Susan Joseph Pandala, Mammen's girlfriend, who dies. Nair fabricates a criminal case against Ravi Mammen for killing Susan. Ravi is court-martialed and sent to jail.

Upon release in 2000, Ravi leaves to Dubai, where he emerges as a successful billionaire in a short time. His business empire is spread all over the Middle East. He is assisted by Chandran Nair, an over-enthusiastic NRI and Yousaf, a gentle young office attender. Ravi's sudden acquisition of exponential financial power and influence makes him an enemy of many who are eagerly waiting for a chance to finish him off.

Swaminathan, a businessman and a fatherlike figure for Ravi, is in deep financial trouble. He wins a lawsuit and gains several million Dirhams, but Victor Sebastian, his cunning attorney, cheats him by conspiring with Kishan Narayan Bhatta, an underworld don from Mumbai. Victor kills Swaminathan and his wife, after forcefully transferring properties to his name. Amritha (Ammu), Swaminathan's daughter reaches Dubai from Bangalore for the funeral. Ravi promises her that he will recover her property. Bhatta tries many ways to resist Ravi. Lieutenant Kiran Cheriyan Pothan, once a subordinate of Ravi in the Army, is in love with Alice - sister of Ravi. Ravi Mammen, while coming to know about this relationship, decides to make Kiran a responsible individual hands over the reins of business to him.

Chandran Nair, who was holding huge power over Ravi, finds Kiran to be his enemy and joins Bhatta. In the absence of Ravi, he plots the murder of Kiran and Ammu. Chandran Nair tells Kiran to take Ammu to a farmhouse, in the outskirts of Dubai. Yousaf drops them both to the farmhouse. On the way back, Bhatta's men capture Yousaf and takes him to Bhatta. There, he finds Chandran Nair was cheating them for his own gains. After being not ready to join them to destroy Ravi, Chandran Nair shoots and kills Yousaf. That night they trespass into the farmhouse and kidnaps Ammu and Victor stabs Kiran from behind. Bhatta asks his men to set fire on the farmhouse where Kiran is lying, dying. However he is saved by an Arab servant. Ravi Mammen returns in short time, where Chandran Nair receives him from the airstrip. Ravi Mammen realises the role of Chandran Nair behind the plot. Chandran Nair shoots himself and is killed. Bhatta asks Ravi to visit him in his resort to agree a final settlement, where he discovers K. J. Nair to be the brains behind Bhatta. Ravi kills K. J. Nair at his guest house in Delhi after which he flies back to Dubai to face Bhatta. Ravi goes to Bhatta's guest house and fights his men and intimidates him about where Ammu is hidden. He succeeds in saving Ammu with the help of Kiran, and during the ensuing struggle, Victor gets killed by Kiran. On his way back again, they are blocked by Bhatta, but in the violent fight that follows, Bhatta is killed after getting his head chopped by the fan of a helicopter. The film ends with Ravi, Ammu and Kiran leaving in the same helicopter which killed Bhatta.

== Cast ==
- Mammootty as Major Ravi Mammen; a former Indian army officer turned Dubai businessman
- Biju Menon as Lt. Kiran Cheriyan Pothan; Ravi's friend & colleague
- Vijayakumar as Yousuf; Ravi's right hand
- N. F. Varghese as Chandran Nair; Ravi's manager
- Nirmal Pandey as Kishan Narayan Bhatta, the main antagonist
- Anjala Zaveri as Amritha Swaminathan (Ammu)
- Janardhanan as Minister K. J. Nair, secondary antagonist
- Cochin Haneefa as Victor Sebastian, Bhatta's associate (third antagonist)
- Nedumudi Venu as Swaminathan
- Urmila Unni as Kunjulakshmi, Ammu's mother
- Preetha Vijayakumar as Alice, Ravi's sister
- Mamukkoya as Kunjappukutty
- Remya Lekshmanan as Anjali Bhakthiyar
- Bharath Gopi as Joseph Pandala/Ouseppukutty
- Vindhya as Susan Joseph Pandala, Ravi's Ex-Lover and Wife
- Sagar Shiyas as Majeed
- Niyaz Musliyar as Shakeel
- Murali Mohan as Mattathil Rajan Abraham Chako
- Shiva Rindani as Mansoor, Bhatta's henchman
- Santhana Bharathi as Karnataka Home Minister Bhadrappa
- Shweta Menon in a special appearance in the item number "Hai Hillalin Thanka"

== Soundtrack ==
The film score was composed by SP Venkatesh. The songs featured in the film were composed by Vidyasagar, with lyrics written by Gireesh Puthenchery and NS Bedi.

No.	Song	Singers	Lyrics	Length (m:ss)
1	"Hai Hillalin Thanka"	M. G. Sreekumar, Swarnalatha	Gireesh Puthenchery	
2	"Khuda Ek Hi Hei"	Chorus, Munna Shoukkath, R. Aalam	N. S. Bedi	
3	"Mukil Mudi"	M. G. Sreekumar, Chorus	Gireesh Puthenchery	
4	"Oru Paattin"	Sujatha Mohan, Nikhil K. Menon, Sreenivas	Gireesh Puthenchery	
5	"Saandhyathaaram Thiriyanachu"	S. Janaki	Gireesh Puthenchery	
6	"Yaduvamsha Yaamini"	K. S. Chithra	Gireesh Puthenchery	
7	"Yaduvamsha Yaamini" (M)	P. Jayachandran	Gireesh Puthenchery	
