= When Eagles Strike =

- American home video cover art
- Directed by: Cirio H. Santiago
- Written by: Michael Kinney
- Produced by: Cirio H. Santiago; Roger Corman
- Starring: Christian Boeving; Stacy Keach; Eddie Garcia; Rey Malonzo; Monsour del Rosario
- Cinematography: Jun Dalawis and Ricardo Remias
- Edited by: Roy Stark
- Music by: Nonong Buencamino
- Production company: Premiere Productions
- Distributed by: Premiere Productions (Philippines); New Concorde (US); Buena Vista Home Entertainment (International)
- Release dates: June 11, 2003 (Philippines); April 20, 2004 (US)
- Running time: 88 minutes
- Countries: United States, Philippines
- Languages: English, Filipino
- Budget: 25 million Philippine peso

External image
- Christian Boeving's character, Lieutenant Andrew Pierce, electro-shocked in the film's torture scene.

When Eagles Strike is a 2003 war action film co-produced and directed by Cirio H. Santiago. The film stars ex-bodybuilder Christian Boeving, Stacy Keach, Davee Youngblood, Nate Adams, Eddie Garcia, Rey Malonzo, and Monsour del Rosario.

The film received mostly negative reviews, and the response for Boeving's portrayal of a classically written action hero has been mixed.

For the Filipino market, a Tagalog language companion piece titled Operation Balikatan was made. It clocks in at 105 minutes, features a change of focus and adds specific scenes with local actors.

== Plot ==
A group of American commandos go on a mission to save American politicians who were kidnapped and held on a forgotten Malaysian island. Tough-guy lieutenant Andrew Pierce commands the group. During the mission it's revealed there's a traitor in the ranks of the team. Consequently, American soldiers are betrayed and captured by the opponents, who then interrogate and brutally torture Pierce.

== Cast ==
- Christian Boeving as Lieutenant Andrew Pierce
- Stacy Keach as General Thurmond
- Davee Youngblood as Private First Class Tyler Owens
- Jesse Vint as Captain Spencer
- Rey Malonzo as Lieutenant Rodrigo Gomez
- Nate Adams as Darren, the military medic
- Eddie Garcia as General Espino
- Jess Lapid Jr. as Salek
- Monsour del Rosario as Ahmed
- Joe Mari Avellana as Ibrahim, a leader of Al-Qaeda

== Production and release ==
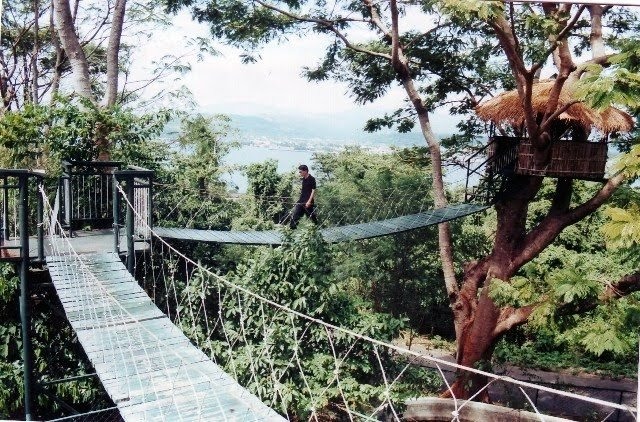

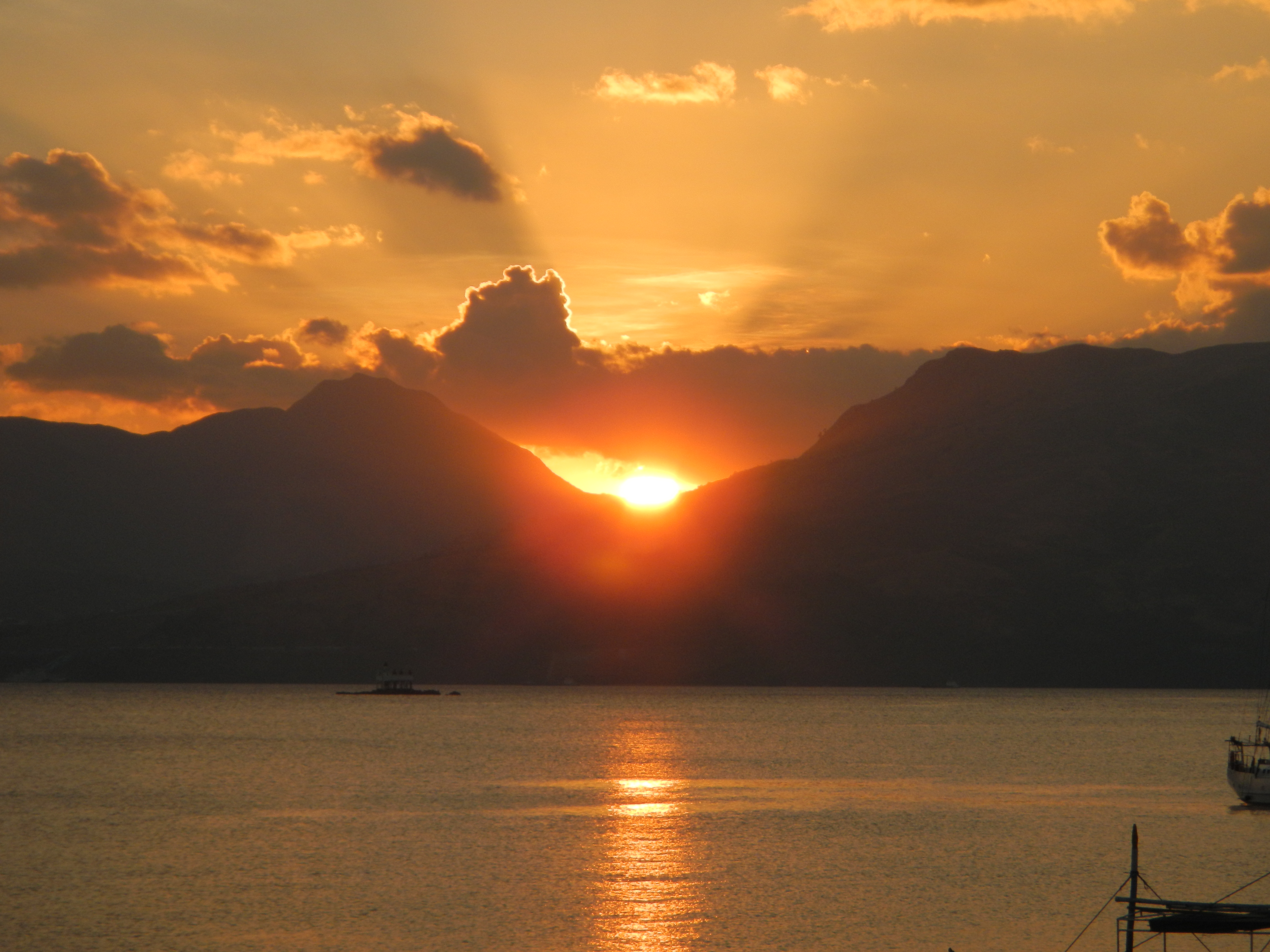
Subic Bay in the Philippines where most of the movie was shot.

The film was shot in the Philippines (including Manila and Subic Bay) early in 2003, with shoots starting on February 4. American as well as Filipino actors were cast in the film, with ex-bodybuilder Christian Boeving taking the lead. Boeving makes his own stunts during the filming, and he stated in the interview for AHF Magazine: "I get my ass severely kicked in the movie, which is something I'm sure a lot of people would like to do to me."

Oscar-winner Jack Palance was supposed to appear in the movie but is not seen in its final version.

When Eagles Strike was released on June 11, 2003, in the Philippines. Then the project was released directly-to-DVD in such countries as Russia (under the title Когда орел атакует), Brazil (as O Ataque dos Águias; the film was tagged as based on a true story), and Japan (as Codename Eagle). In Turkey, it was distributed under the title Kartal Darbesi. In April 2004 the film was released on DVD in the United States. The movie was released as Black Hawk Down sequel in Taiwan.

== Reception ==
The film received mixed to generally negative critical reception, currently holding 33% fresh on Rotten Tomatoes. Scott Weinberg from eFilmCritic.com concluded: "One might be tempted to classify this movie as 'ripped from the headlines' when in fact 'ripped from the trash heap' would be an infinitely more accurate assessment. (...) If (...) you're looking for a solid war movie, just keep on walkin'." Weinberg called his review of When Eagles Strike "Where's John Rambo when we need him?", and awarded the film one star out of four. MonsterHunter believed that characters in the movie are "noisily dull," and named Christian Boeving's lead "Uncle Sam on steroids," saying that "his massive arms are the only real development his character has."

An editor of Actionfreunde called Boeving "a walking muscle", a man "as charismatic as a slowly drying wallpaper piece." In The German Lexicon of International Films it is stated that When Eagles Strike is a clichéd, stereotypical action movie riddled with references to the September 11 attacks. A reviewer from action cinema-related website Yippee-ki-yay, Motherf*cker! believed that the movie lacked the element of surprise but praised Boeving as its sole positive aspect. "Boeving is refreshing as a macho-type commando. (...) He's a resurrected 80s action movie hero—dripping sweat, super handsome, running through the jungles in a tight undershirt." Prime News listed "When Eagles Strike" among the greatest war movies of all time (it received an honorable mention).

== Sequel ==
A sequel, When Eagles Strike 2 − Mission: Survive, was written, and was supposed to have been filmed in 2004 as a television film, but the project was canceled. Lieutenant Andrew Pierce was the main character once again.
