= Security (2017 film) =

- Theatrical release poster
- Directed by: Alain DesRochers
- Written by: Tony Mosher; John Sullivan
- Produced by: Jeffrey Greenstein; David Harris; Gisella Marengo; Jonathan Yunger
- Starring: Antonio Banderas; Gabriella Wright; Ben Kingsley; Liam McIntyre; Truth Hurts
- Cinematography: Anton Bakarski
- Music by: FM Le Sieur
- Production company: Nu Image
- Distributed by: Millennium Media
- Release date: August 4, 2017
- Running time: 92 minutes
- Country: United States
- Language: English
- Budget: $15 million
- Box office: $776,522

Security is a 2017 American action thriller film directed by Alain DesRochers and written by Tony Mosher and John Sullivan. The film stars Antonio Banderas, Gabriella Wright, Ben Kingsley, and Chad Lindberg.

== Plot ==
Eddie Deacon, a former Marine Corps Security Captain, finds a job as a mall security guard. He meets fellow guards Vance, Ruby, Mason, and Johnny.

Meanwhile, a US Marshal convoy transporting a girl named Jamie is ambushed by mercenaries. She is the main witness in an organized crime trial. The Marshals are ambushed and killed but Jamie escapes and seeks refuge at the mall. Mercenary leader Charlie attempts to bribe the guards for Jamie but Eddie refuses. Charlie informs his men that they and their families will be executed if they fail to retrieve Jamie.

Eddie and the guards create homemade bombs and traps to defend the mall. They stall and kill several mercenaries, but Johnny is killed by a sniper while trying to signal the police and Ruby is mortally wounded while aiding Vance's escape. Other US Marshals arrive, but Eddie notices the mercenary tattoo on their necks and kills them. Mason is killed and Vance is badly wounded and presumed dead.

Eddie sends Jamie to radio for help, then is attacked by Charlie's second in command Dead Eyes. He disables the mercenary's radio jammer with a trike kept in the mall and then kills Dead Eyes and the sniper with a gun Vance had hidden in his car. Charlie finds Jamie in the mall, but Jamie shocks him with a taser and Eddie shoots Charlie in the head with Vance's pistol, killing him.

The police arrive and take Jamie to safety, and Vance is revealed to be alive. Jamie tells Eddie his daughter is lucky to have a father like him. Eddie reunites with his wife and daughter.

== Cast ==
- Antonio Banderas as Eddie Deacon
- Ben Kingsley as Charlie
- Liam McIntyre as Vance
- Cung Le as "Dead Eyes"
- Katherine Mary de la Rocha as Jamie
- Chad Lindberg as Mason
- Jiro Wang as Johnny Wei
- Gabriella Wright as Ruby
- Shari Watson as Administrator

== Production ==
Principal photography on the film began in November 2015 in Bulgaria and ended on January 22, 2016. Alain DesRochers directed the $15 million budgeted film for Nu Image / Millennium Films.

== Release ==
On October 3, 2017, the film became available to stream on Netflix in various countries.
