= Is Raat Ki Subah Nahin =

1996 film by Sudhir Mishra

- Poster
- Directed by: Sudhir Mishra
- Written by: Nikhil Advani (screenplay); Sudhir Mishra (screenplay); Shivkumar Subramaniam (screenplay)
- Story by: Sudhanshu Mishra
- Produced by: Mahesh Bhatt; Amit Khanna
- Starring: Nirmal Pandey; Smriti Mishra; Tara Deshpande; Ashish Vidyarthi
- Cinematography: Sukumar Jatania
- Edited by: Renu Saluja
- Music by: M. M. Kreem
- Production company: Plus Films
- Distributed by: Vishesh Films
- Release date: 7 June 1996
- Country: India
- Language: Hindi

Is Raat Ki Subah Nahin (transl. No End to This Night) is a 1996 Indian Hindi-language thriller film directed by Sudhir Mishra. The film stars Tara Deshpande and Nirmal Pandey, with the entire plot taking place over a single night. The film is based on a story written by Sudhir Mishra's brother, Sudhanshu Mishra, who died in 1995.

In 2011, Sudir Mishra launched a spiritual sequel to Is Raat Ki Subah Nahin, titled Yeh Saali Zindagi, with Arunoday Singh, Irrfan Khan and Chitrangada Singh.

== Plot ==
An advertising executive, Aditya has a beautiful wife, Pooja and a beautiful mistress, Malvika. This secret affair is the catalyst for much of the plot. Adi gets into a scuffle with a bunch of gangsters led by Ramanbhai,. To add to the tension, Ramanbhai is under duress because his colleague, Vilas Pandey is after his life.

A small-scale gang war erupts in the city: A police Inspector Patankar is changing sides faster than a chameleon, a rival gang lord Prafulla Kalia is offering deals and — in the middle of all this — Aditya finds himself stuck. A fast-paced sequence of events happen in the span of one single night.

== Cast ==
- Nirmal Pandey as Aditya
- Tara Deshpande as Pooja
- Smriti Mishra as Malvika
- Manoj Pahwa as Rajesh
- Saurabh Shukla as Vilas Pandey
- Ashish Vidyarthi as Ramanbhai
- Seema Bhargava as Ramanbhai's sister
- Johnny Lever in a guest role
- Deepak Qazir as Vilas's accomplice
- Virendra Saxena as Prafulla Kalia
- Sandeep Kulkarni as Shankar
- Kishore Kadam as Ganya
- Ganesh Yadav as Inspector Patankar
- Murad Ali as Chhotu, Ramanbhai's so-called younger brother
- R. Madhavan as the club singer in the song "Chup Tum Raho"
- Akhil Mishra as the Neighbour

== Soundtrack ==
Is Raat Ki Subah Nahin

Soundtrack album by M. M. Kreem
- Released: 9 June 1996 (India)
- Genre: Film soundtrack
- Label: PLUS MUSIC/T-SERIES
- Producer: M. M. Kreem

M. M. Kreem chronology
Sahasa Veerudu Sagara Kanya (1996)	Is Raat Ki Subah Nahin (1996)	Rayudugaru Nayudugaru (1996)

The soundtrack includes the following tracks and instrumentals, composed by M. M. Kreem, with lyrics by Nida Fazli, who received a Filmfare Best Lyricist Award Nomination for "Jeevan Kya Hai." Background music was by Salim–Sulaiman.

Song	Singer
"Mere Tere Naam"	S. P. Balasubrahmanyam
"Hey Babu, Hello Babu, Jhoomo Naacho"	S. P. Balasubrahmanyam, K. S. Chithra
"Dushmani Hogi"	K. S. Chithra
"Pehli Baar Mile"	K. S. Chithra, Mano
"Chup Tum Raho"	K. S. Chithra, M. M. Kreem
"Jeevan Kya Hai"	M. M. Kreem

== Critical reception ==
In a retrospective review, Ronjita Kulkarni of Rediff.com wrote, "At a time when the supporting cast was relegated to the background, Sudhir Mishra has done just the opposite. Iss Raat Ki Subah Nahin would not have worked so well without its brilliant actors."

== Awards ==
- 1996: Star Screen Award: Best Editing: Renu Saluja
- 1996: Bengal Film Journalists' Association Awards: Best Actor Award (Hindi): Ashish Vidyarthi
- 1997: Star Screen Award for Best Villain: Ashish Vidyarthi
