= India: Kingdom of the Tiger =

2002 IMAX documentary based on the writings of Jim Corbett

- Theatrical release poster
- Directed by: Bruce Neibaur
- Written by: Keero Birla
- Starring: Christopher Heyerdahl; Smriti Mishra; Colin Vint (narrator)
- Cinematography: Matthew Williams
- Music by: Michael Brook
- Release date: 2002
- Running time: 42 min.
- Countries: Canada, India
- Languages: English, Hindi

India: Kingdom of the Tiger is a 2002 IMAX feature documentary, inspired by the writings of Jim Corbett. The film was directed by Bruce Neibaur. It depicts man-eating tigers and the conservation efforts of the tiger in India.

== Plot ==
The plot is loosely connected to the personal stories from Jim Corbett's 1944 bestselling book Man-Eaters of Kumaon. Dramatic recreations and documentary footage deftly recreate the drama and era of early 20th century, with Jim Corbett portrayed by Canadian actor, Christopher Heyerdahl.

In the film – Corbett is asked to kill a man-eating tiger, which has killed a young woman in Kumaon. Corbett arrives at Kumaon and meets with local people. The sister of the victim (portrayed by Mishra Smriti) takes Corbett to the killing site. They together ambush the man-eater and Corbett kills the tiger from the machan. During this plot, the narration (by Corbett) contains stories of the history of India and the Kumaon region, as well as the efforts to save Indian tigers.

== Cast ==
- Christopher Heyerdahl as Jim Corbett
- Smriti Mishra as the Indian woman who assists Corbett

== Filming ==
The principal filming took place in the foothills of the Himalayas, as well as scenic locations all over India. An additional 2nd unit was filmed in Canada. The production used exclusive IMAX cameras, and filmed on 65mm film negative; making it the first IMAX film ever shot in India.

== Soundtrack ==
The film score for India: Kingdom of the Tiger was composed and produced by acclaimed ambient guitarist and world musician Michael Brook. The score was recorded at the Lavenderia and Real World Studios. Rahat Fateh Ali Khan and Lakshmi Shankar contributed vocals to the project.

The soundtrack album was released by Four Winds Trading Company in 2002. Bruce Neibaur, the film's director, wrote the following lines in the soundtrack album: "From almost my first day of work on India--Kingdom of the Tiger I was worried about the music...being heavy-handed.... Michael Brook has created a score that has washed away all my worries and concerns. He has masterfully painted in the rich, magical shades of India that are so important to the story. His music, from its very first notes, transports us into that faraway land. When the film is finished, I believe audiences will be wishing they could stay there longer."

== See also ==
- Conservation
