= Mary (2005 film) =

- Film poster
- Directed by: Abel Ferrara
- Written by: Abel Ferrara; Mario Isabella; Simone Lageoles; Scott Pardo
- Produced by: Roberto De Nigris; David Hausen; Thierry Klemeniuk; Fernando Sulichin
- Starring: Juliette Binoche; Forest Whitaker; Marion Cotillard; Matthew Modine; Heather Graham
- Cinematography: Stefano Falivene
- Edited by: Patrizio Marone; Adam Mcclelland; Fabio Nunziata; Langdon Page; Julia Ruell
- Music by: Francis Kuipers
- Production company: Central Films
- Distributed by: Pan-Européenne Distribution (France); IFC Films (United States)
- Release date: 2005
- Running time: 94 minutes
- Countries: Italy; France; United States
- Languages: English; Hebrew; French

Mary is a 2005 drama thriller film, written and directed by American director Abel Ferrara. The film stars Juliette Binoche, Forest Whitaker, Marion Cotillard, Matthew Modine and Heather Graham.

The film premiered at the 2005 Venice Film Festival where it won the Special Jury Prize, as well as three smaller awards. The film also played at the 2005 Toronto International Film Festival, Deauville Film Festival and San Sebastián International Film Festival.

Although co-produced by an American and French film company and shot in English and partly in the United States, the film has been little seen outside of Europe, and does not have a Region 1 DVD release. It received a limited theatrical release in America a full three years after premiering at the Venice Film Festival. The film has three European non-English language websites, but no English language website. UK DVDs use the title Mary: This is My Blood.

== Plot summary ==
Following the shooting of a film on the life of Jesus called This Is My Blood, Marie Palesi, the actress who plays Mary Magdalene takes refuge in Jerusalem in search of the truth behind the story, while the film's director, who also plays Jesus, returns to New York to aggressively promote the film. The film within a film is drawing public controversy for reasons that are never directly specified, but some scenes in the film draw on the non-canonical Gnostic Gospels, while there are public allegations that the film is anti-Semitic for reasons that are not given. In New York, television journalist Ted Younger (Forest Whitaker) is presenting a series of programs about the life of Jesus, and chooses to interview the film's director. Privately, Younger is having a crisis of faith.

== Cast ==
- Forest Whitaker – Ted Younger
- Juliette Binoche – Marie Palesi/Mary Magdalene
- Matthew Modine – Tony Childress/Jesus
- Heather Graham – Elizabeth Younger
- Marion Cotillard – Gretchen Mol
- Stefania Rocca – Brenda Sax
- Francine Berting – Nurse #2
- Giovanni Capalbo – Police man
- Massimo Cortesi – Priest
- Ettore D'Alessandro – Apostle Andrew
- Alex Grazioli – Apostle Matthew
- Emanuela Iovannitti – Johanna, Mary's follower
- Marco Leonardi – Apostle Peter
- Amos Luzzatto – himself
- Thure Riefenstein – Silvanus
- Gisella Marengo – Nurse Nicu
- Mario Opinato – Apostle James
- Gabriella Wright – TV technician
- Dominot – First Angel
- Elaine Pagels
- Jean-Yves Leloup

== Reception ==
Upon its release, Mary immediately divided critics and viewers alike, it holds a 59% rating on Rotten Tomatoes based on 17 reviews, with an average score of 5.5/10.

=== Positive ===
- "A sincere grapple with faith and redemption in cynical times." – Leslie Felperin, Variety
- "Somehow turns confusion into a concise study on what it means to believe in God in this day and age." – Chris Cabin, Filmcritic.com
- "..both Forest Whitaker and Juliette Binoche (as with the rest of the cast) give such amazing performances that they should be added to the list of the best work of their careers." – Michael Ferraro, Film Threat

=== Negative ===
- "Ferrara presents his ideas in what's meant to be a meditation on the nature of faith but ends up an incoherent, pretentious mess." – Josh Bell, Las Vegas Weekly
- "Some critics went as far as rebaptising (excuse the pun) the director "Unable Ferrara" after the press screening here in Venice." – Boyd van Hoeij, Europeanfilms.net
- "Murky and forgettable." – Ray Bennett, The Hollywood Reporter

== Soundtrack ==
The original soundtrack was written by Francis Kuipers.

=== Track listing ===
- "Mary (prologue)" – 1.53
- "They Took my Lord" – 6.15
- "Disciples & Discord" – 4.04
- "Street Attack" – 1.06
- "Mary in the Desert" – 3.54
- "Gnostic Gospel" – 3.29
- "Women at Sea" – 1.56
- "Sacred Heart" – 3.18
- "Among Believers" – 2.50
- "Holy Land Explosion" – 1.25
- "Madness of God" – 3.36
- "This is my Blood" – 5.43
- "Hidden Scripture" – 2.53
- "Mary (Epilogue)" – 3.35

=== Soundtrack credits ===
- Francis Kuipers – Guitar
- Miriam Butler – Bassoon
- David Barittoni – Voices
- Giulio Luciani – Viola, violin
- Roberto Bellatalla – Double Bass
- Paola Di Silvestro – Soprano
- Fabio Colucci – Music producer and mixer

Recorded at Herzog Studios, Rome (Italy)

== Awards ==
Venice Film Festival 2005

- Grand Jury Prize
- Mimmo Rotella Foundation Award
- SIGNIS Award
- Sergio Trasatti Award

== French film poster ==
The French poster for Mary features a woman praying at an altar. The image was taken in the Church of the Holy Sepulchre in Jerusalem. The film was the first film to be allowed film in the actual church.

== See also ==
- List of films about angels
