= Gisella Marengo =

Italian actress and producer (born 1975)

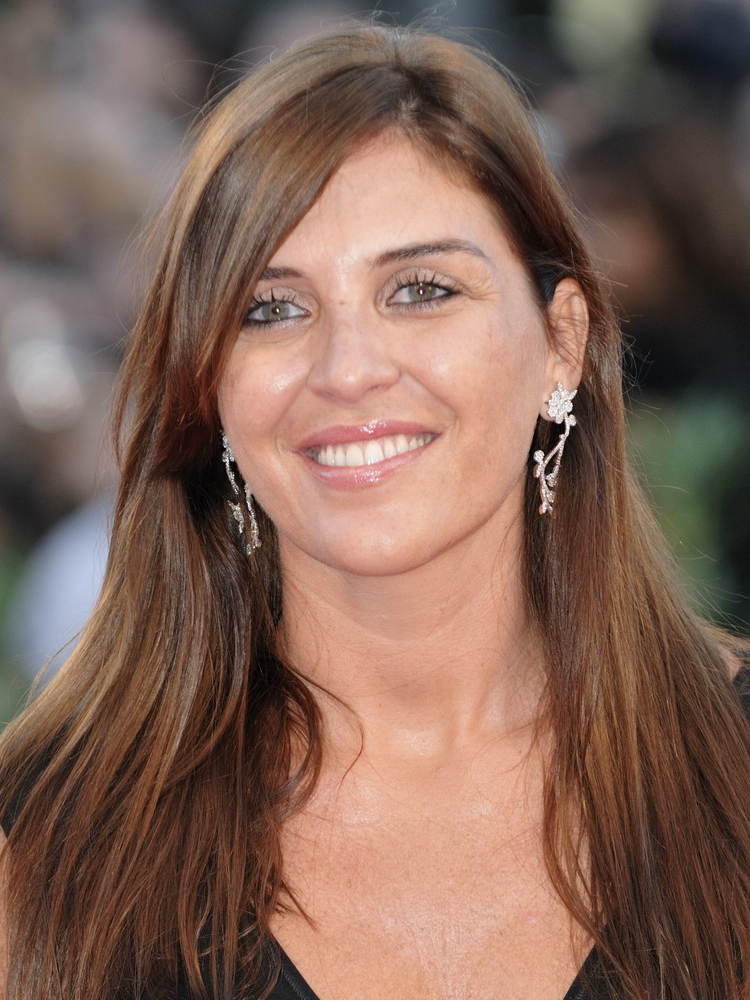
- Marengo in 2009
- Born: 16 December 1975 (age 50); Cuneo, Italy
- Occupations: Actress; producer
- Years active: 2000–present

Gisella Marengo (born 16 December 1975) is an Italian actress and producer. Her acting portfolio includes minor roles in La sconosciuta, by Giuseppe Tornatore and Third Person by Paul Haggis. Transitioning into production, Marengo produced The Humbling, starring Al Pacino, Blackbird, featuring Susan Sarandon and Kate Winslet and the documentary Ennio directed by Giuseppe Tornatore.

== Early life and education ==
The daughter of an Italian father and a Monégasque mother, Marengo developed an interest in theatre at an early age. She moved to Rome in 2000 and for five years, she studied acting with Francesca De Sapio, a member of the Actors Studio in New York. She then moved to Los Angeles, where she studied film at UCLA and acting at the Beverly Hills Play House.

== Career ==
In 2003, Gisella Marengo participated in Pupi Avati's film "Il cuore altrove" alongside Giancarlo Giannini, and in 2005, she played the role of Mina in the thriller "Mary.", directed by Abel Ferrara. In 2006, she appeared in Giuseppe Tornatore's film "La sconosciuta" which won several David di Donatello awards. In 2006, she was in Dario Argento's film "La terza madre". After the horror film by Argento, she played a comedic role in "Scusa ma ti chiamo amore," portraying the sister of Alex, played by Raul Bova. She then worked again with Avati in the film "Il papà di Giovanna". In 2009, she played one of the lead roles in the TV film "Doc West," directed by Giulio Base and shot in English in New Mexico. In the same year, under the direction of Tornatore, she was in the cast of "Baarìa" where she played Matilde. In 2011, she portrayed Maliva in "Conan the Barbarian" and simultaneously played Gizele Moltova in Dito Montiel's "The Son of No One". In 2013, she took on the role of Natalia in Paul Haggis's film "Third Person". She also worked in theatre, acting in "Women with Class" and Chekhov's "The Seagull," both performed at the Teatro Colosseo.

In 2014, Gisella Marengo embarked on her journey as a film producer. She produced several projects, including "The Humbling" starring Al Pacino and directed by Barry Levinson, and the American drama "Blackbird," featuring Susan Sarandon and Kate Winslet, directed by Roger Michell. She also worked on action movies such as "Angel Has Fallen" with Gerald Butler and Morgan Freeman "Hunter Killer" starring Gerald Butler and Gary Oldman, and "Security" featuring Antonio Banderas. Among her recent productions, in 2020, Gisella Marengo produced the documentary "Francesco," directed by Oscar-nominated Evgeny Afineevsky. The film premiered at the Rome Film Festival and was awarded with the 18th Kinéo Prize. The following year, she was the producer behind the highly acclaimed and renowned documentary "Ennio," which delved into the life of the famous Italian Oscar-winning film composer, Ennio Morricone. Directed by Oscar winning director Giuseppe Tornatore, the documentary features interviews with world-class artists, including Clint Eastwood, Quentin Tarantino, Hans Zimmer, and Bruce Springsteen. It made its debut at the Venice International Film Festival and it was awarded with the prestigious David di Donatello Award for Best Documentary and the Starlight International Film Award. In 2023, Marengo co-produced the action-packed "Expend4bles," featuring actors like Megan Fox, Sylvester Stallone, and Jason Statham.

She is an ambassador for "Artists for Peace and Justice," an organization primarily focused on serving the communities of Haiti with programs in education and healthcare. Marengo is also an ambassador for “Love in Action,” a movement on women's emancipation in collaboration with the Chopra Foundation. She has been twice in the jury of the Monte Carlo Television Festival.

== Filmography ==
- Io amo Andrea, director Francesco Nuti (2000)
- Il cuore altrove, director Pupi Avati (2003)
- Sandra Kristoff, director Vito Vinci (2005)
- Mary, director Abel Ferrara (2005)
- Casa Vianello, TV serial 2 episodes (2006)
- La sconosciuta, director Giuseppe Tornatore (2006)
- Voce del verbo amore, director Andrea Manni (2007)
- Mother of Tears, director Dario Argento (2007)
- La terza madre, director Dario Argento (2007)
- Scusa ma ti chiamo amore, director Federico Moccia (2008)
- Il papà di Giovanna, director Pupi Avati (2008)
- Le cose in te nascoste, director Vito Vinci (2008)
- Gli amici del bar Margherita, director Pupi Avati (2009)
- Baarìa, director Giuseppe Tornatore (2009)
- Doc West, director Giulio Base (2009)
- Doc West: la sfida, director Giulio Base (2009)
- Il figlio più piccolo, director Pupi Avati (2010)
- Conan the Barbarian, director Marcus Nispel (2010)
- The Son of No One, director Dito Montiel (2011)
- Wilde Salomé, director Al Pacino (2011)
- Quello che so sull'amore, director Gabriele Muccino (2012)
- Paying for Keeps, director Gabriele Muccino (2012)
- Third Person, director Paul Haggis (2013)
- Criminal, director Ariel Vromen (2013)

== Productions ==
- Hercules - La leggenda ha inizio, director Renny Harlin (2014)
- The Humbling, director Barry Levinson (2014)
- Leningrad (2014)
- Security, director Alain Desrochers (2017)
- Act of Vengeance, director Isaac Florentine (2017)
- Hunter Killer, director Donovan Marsh (2018)
- 211, director York Alec Shackleton (2018)
- Blackbird, director Roger Michell (2019)
- Eye for an Eye, director Francesco Cinquemani and George Gallo (2019)
- Angel Has Fallen, director Ric Roman Waugh (2019)
- Francesco, director Evgeny Afineevsky (2020)
- Till Death, director S.K. Dale (2021)
- Ennio, director Giuseppe Tornatore (2021)
- Expend4bles, director Scott Waugh (2023)

== Theatre ==
- Torquis (2011)
- Donne di una certa classe (2013)
