= Zombie Massacre (film) =

2013 film

- Festival poster
- Directed by: Luca Boni; Marco Ristori
- Written by: Luca Boni; Marco Ristori; Russell Romick
- Produced by: Uwe Boll; Luca Boni; Marco Ristori; Benjamin Krotin
- Starring: Tara Cardinal; Mike Mitchell; Christian Boeving
- Cinematography: Mirco Sgarzi
- Edited by: Marco Ristori
- Production companies: 1988 Games; Boll Kino Beteiligungs
- Distributed by: Entertainment One
- Release date: July 1, 2013
- Running time: 90 minutes
- Countries: Italy; United States; Germany; Canada
- Language: English

Zombie Massacre (UK DVD title: Apocalypse Z) is a 2013 horror film written and directed by Luca Boni and Marco Ristori. Uwe Boll served as producer and acted within the film in the role of President of the United States. The film stars ex-bodybuilder Christian Boeving, Mike Mitchell, and Tara Cardinal, and is an adaptation of the Wii video game of the same name, developed by 1988 Games. The film had its UK DVD release on July 1, 2013. The sequel, Zombie Massacre 2: Reich of the Dead, was released in 2015.

== Plot ==
As the U.S. government begins experimenting with a bacteriological weapon in a small town in Eastern Europe, a disaster occurs in which the weapon spreads its effects on the citizens of the area, turning them into mutated zombies. To cover up the exposure and make it look like a nuclear meltdown of an area power station, the U.S. President orders a team of contracted mercenaries to be sent in to wipe out the zombie plague and secure the "accident" while facing off with the zombie horde.

== Cast ==
- Christian Boeving as Jack Stone
- Mike Mitchell as John 'Mad Dog' McKellen
- Tara Cardinal as Eden Shizuka
- Jon Campling as Doug Mulligan
- Carl Wharton as General Carter
- Daniel Vivian as Dragan Ilic
- Nathalia Henao as Claire Howard
- Gerry Shanahan as Doctor Neumann
- Ivy Corbin as Sam Neumann
- Michael Segal as First Victim / Ultimate creature
- Uwe Boll as President of the US

== Production ==
Apocalypse Z, UK DVD cover

In 2007, plans for the film and Wii video game were first announced. In 2011, it was announced that Boni and Ristori were attached to direct, with filming expected to take place the following year. In October 2012, a trailer for Apocalypse Z was released.

== Release ==
Zombie Massacre was released on Blu-ray on August 29, 2013, but according to The Numbers both DVD and Blu-ray haven't been released until November 2013.

== Reception ==
HorrorNews.net gave the film a rating of C−, stating that while the film was "overall [awful]", the directing and makeup effects were a highlight.

== Sequel ==
A sequel, Zombie Massacre 2: Reich of the Dead, also directed by Luca Boni and Marco Ristori was released in 2015.

== See also ==
- Nazi zombie films
