= Rashtriya Chemicals & Fertilisers Company Ground =

Multi purpose stadium in Mumbai, Maharashtra, India

- RCF Ground
- Interactive map of Rashtriya Chemicals & Fertilisers Company Ground
- Full name: Rashtriya Chemicals & Fertilisers Company Ground
- Location: Mumbai, Maharashtra
- Owner: Rashtriya Chemicals & Fertilizers
- Operator: Rashtriya Chemicals & Fertilizers
- Capacity: 5,000

Construction
- Groundbreaking: 1986
- Opened: 1986

Website
- Cricinfo

Rashtriya Chemicals & Fertilisers Company Ground is a multi purpose stadium in Mumbai, Maharashtra. The ground is mainly used for organizing matches of football, cricket and other sports. The stadium has hosted two Ranji Trophy matches first in 1986 when Bombay cricket team played against Baroda cricket team and again in 1995 when Bombay cricket team played against Baroda cricket team.

The stadium has hosted a List A matches in 1995 when Bombay cricket team played against Baroda cricket team but since then the stadium has hosted non-first-class matches.
