= Gabriella Wright =

English actress and model (born 1982)

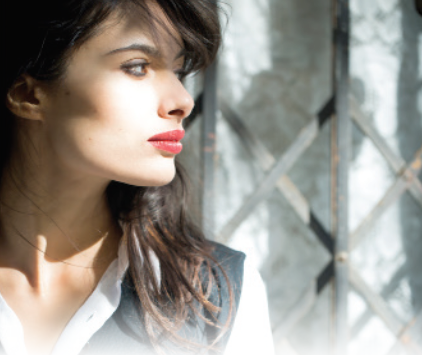
- Born: 19 June 1982 (age 44); Stoke Newington, London, England
- Other name: Gabriella Miranda-Sequela
- Occupations: Actress; model; activist
- Years active: 2004–present
- Height: 174 cm (5 ft 9 in)
- Spouse: Thierry Klemeniuk (m. 2005; div. 2010)
- Relatives: Paulette Wright (sister)
- Website: gabriellawright.com

Gabriella Wright (born 19 June 1982) is an English actress and model, best known for playing Queen Claude of France in the series The Tudors (2007), Viola in the film The Perfect Husband (2014), and Gina in the action thriller The Transporter Refueled (2015). In addition to her acting and modeling careers, she is a humanitarian and activist with contributions to many international campaigns on gender-based violence and suicide prevention.

== Early life ==
Wright was born on 19 June 1982 in Stoke Newington, London, England to Paul David Wright, a sculptor and painter, and Anne Catherine Wright, a teacher and writer. Her siblings are Paulette and Pascal Wright. Wright is of English and Scottish descent on her father's side, and French, Portuguese and Mauritian on her mother's.

Wright moved to France with her parents at the age of 12, and graduated in English Literature and Social Economics.

Wright's acting coaches have included Susan Batson and Jack Garfein.

== Acting career ==
In 2004, Wright played her first lead role, in the film One Dollar Curry, directed by Vijay Singh.

In 2007, Wright appeared as Queen Claude of France in the historical drama series The Tudors.

In 2014, Wright appeared in the 7th season of the HBO's supernatural drama series True Blood, in which she played the role of Sylvie. She played the lead role in the horror film The Perfect Husband along with Bret Roberts and Carl Wharton, directed by Lucas Pavetto.

In 2015 Wright appeared in the action thriller film The Transporter Refueled, directed by Camille Delamarre.

In 2016, Wright was cast in the film Security as Ruby, which stars Antonio Banderas and Ben Kingsley.

In 2018, Wright played Rebekha Volt in Action Team, a spy comedy spoof directed by James De Frond.

Wright played Veronika, the personal hitwoman for Antonio Banderas's character in the 2021 American action comedy film, Hitman's Wife's Bodyguard, directed by Patrick Hughes.

== Activism ==
Wright's humanitarian engagement dates back to 2004. She is the founder of the production company Conscious Intent which supports different media formats to promote "the human story".

In 2019, she produced 'I am Never Alone', directed by Michel Pascal, which was the impetus for The Never Alone non-profit.

She shares her meditation practice with parolees in the greater Los Angeles area, facilitated by the Amity Foundation. She is a goodwill ambassador to Skypower, a solar company with a socio-economic impact model for developing nations, and is the honorary president of a grassroots charity in Myanmar that works in slums in and around Yangon.

As a motivational speaker, she advocates for an end to violence against women and girls and has lent her voice to UN Women and the UN Trust Fund to End Violence against Women in London (2018) and in Los Angeles (2019) with Nicole Kidman. She has been a guest speaker at the Difficult Dialogues forum (2018) which compared the 'Me too' movements in India and Hollywood and has also spoken numerous times at Carnegie Hall on healing trauma, the power of meditation and how to seek fulfillment, irrespective of life circumstances. Her recent engagement featured a powerful story of a young woman survivor of violence from Zimbabwe, which she narrated at the opening of the First UN Trust Fund Grantee Convention held in Bosnia and Herzegovina on 24 October 24, 2019, and a seminar on suicide prevention and self-awareness, which she delivered at Amrita Vishwa Vidyapeetham University in India on 3 January 2020.

== Personal life ==
From 2005 to 2010 Wright was married to producer Thierry Klemeniuk.

== Filmography ==
=== Film ===
Year	Title	Role	Notes
2004	Albert est méchant	L'employée 'Bank'	
2004	One Dollar Curry	Nathalie	
2005	Mary	TV Studio Manager	
2007	The Last Gang	Daniella	
2007	Eden Log	N/A	
2009	Demain dès l'aube	N/A	
2010	An Organization of Dreams	Nagra	
2010	22 Bullets	Yasmina Telaa	
2013	Collision	Odette	
2014	The Perfect Husband	Viola	
2014	Everly	Anna	
2015	The Transporter Refueled	Gina	
2015	Septembers of Shiraz	Farideh	
2016	Alcoholist	Claire	
2017	Security	Ruby	
2021	Hitman's Wife's Bodyguard	Veronika	
TBA	I Am Never Alone	Gabriella	Post-production

=== Television ===
Year	Title	Role	Notes
2007	The Innocence Project	Colette Givray	1 episode
2007	The Tudors	Queen Claude of France	3 episodes
2010	Nomads	Nadia	Unsold TV pilot
2011	Jack of Diamonds	Nadia Raminez	TV film
2011	Rani	Indra	3 episodes
2013	Payday	Greta	2 episodes
2014	True Blood	Sylvie	1 episode
2015	Cheerleader Death Squad	Marja	Unsold TV pilot
2016	Arrow	Esrin Fortuna	1 episode
2017	The Way	Sara	
2018	Action Team	Rebekha Volt	2 episodes
