= The Perfect Husband (2014 film) =

- Directed by: Lucas Pavetto
- Written by: Lucas Pavetto; Massimo Vavassori
- Produced by: Lucas Pavetto
- Starring: Bret Roberts; Gabriella Wright; Carl Wharton; Philippe Reinhardt; Tania Bambaci; Daniel Vivian
- Cinematography: Davide Manca
- Music by: Giuseppe Capozzolo
- Release date: 1 July 2014 (Italy)
- Running time: 83
- Country: Italy
- Language: English

The Perfect Husband is a 2014 independent Italian horror film written and directed by Lucas Pavetto. It stars Bret Roberts, Gabriella Wright, Carl Wharton, Tania Bambaci, Philippe Reinhardt, and Daniel Vivian.

== Plot ==
Viola and Nichola are going through a difficult period. The couple and their relationship was strained by a stillborn birth that has overwhelmed them unexpectedly. To overcome this crisis, the two decide to spend a weekend in an old cottage lost in the woods, but things will take a devilish turn when a crazy suspicion gets into one of their heads. What was supposed to be a quiet weekend will turn suddenly into a deadly nightmare.

== Cast ==
- Bret Roberts as Nicola
- Gabriella Wright as Viola
- Carl Wharton as Forest Ranger
- Daniel Vivian as Gipsy
- Tania Bambaci as Doctor
- Philippe Reinhardt as Hans

== Production ==
The Perfect Husband is a film from Italy. Filming started in April 2013. Shot and recorded in English, this horror title was set for a release in Italy on 4 December 2014.

== Reception ==
The film was screened at festivals including Macabre Faire Film Festival, New York City Horror Film Festival, Fantafestival, Fantasporto, and won Best First Work in Fantafestival.

== Awards ==
- Best First Work at the Fantafestival (2014, won)
- Best Feature at Week end Of Fear (2015, won)
- Best Feature at Miami Independent Film Festival (2015, won)
- Best Feature at Vienna Fright Nights (2015, won)
- Best Feature at the Open Wound Horror Film Festival (2014, won)
- Best Editing Best Sound at the Macabre Faire Film Festival (2015, won)
