= Christian Boeving =

American actor

- Born: William Christian Boeving; June 5, 1969 (age 57); Dallas, Texas
- Website: Official website

Christian Boeving (born June 5, 1969) is an American actor, writer, producer, fitness model, personal trainer, and former bodybuilding supplement spokesperson. He grew up in Missouri, United States and resides in Los Angeles County in Southern California.

== Biography ==
Boeving was born in Dallas, Texas.

Boeving went on to guest-star in television shows like V.I.P., Sheena, Nash Bridges, and Malcolm in the Middle, and later garnered roles in major motion pictures such as Batman & Robin and Daredevil and Ridley Scott's Kingdom of Heaven. He carried the lead role (Lt. Andrew Pierce) in the low budget action film When Eagles Strike (2003), directed by Cirio H. Santiago, and later played Grendel in 2007's charity-film Beowulf: Prince of the Geats, produced in order to benefit the American Cancer Society. Boeving also played Dash Rendar in the unreleased fan film Star Wars: Secrets of the Rebellion. made famous due to its writer/director Mark Twitchell who was convicted of murder in Edmonton, Canada.

Boeving also starred in the feature film Zombie Massacre, based on the 1998 video game for the Amiga computer, under the same name. This was a clone of the immensely popular first person shooter Doom on the Amiga. He appeared in Magic Mike XXL, a sequel to the 2012 box-office hit, but his scenes were edited out.

Boeving was featured in the highly acclaimed documentary Bigger, Stronger, Faster, in which he revealed that he has used anabolic steroids since the age of 16. Shortly after the film's premiere at the Sundance Film Festival, MuscleTech, a bodybuilding supplement company dropped its sponsorship of Boeving for breaching the company's rules by discussing his steroid use.
