= Tania Bambaci =

Italian beauty pageant titleholder

- Born: Nunziata Bambaci; 11 August 1990 (age 36); Barcellona Pozzo di Gotto; Sicily, Italy
- Height: 6 ft 0 in (1.83 m)
- Beauty pageant titleholder
- Title: Una Ragazza Per Il Cinema 2008; Miss Sicilia 2010; Miss Regina D'Europa 2011; Miss Mondo Italia 2011
- Hair color: Brown
- Eye color: Brown
- Major competitions: Miss Italia 2010 (top 10); Miss World 2011 (top 15)

Tania Bambaci (born 11 August 1990 in Barcellona Pozzo di Gotto, Sicily, Italy) is an Italian actress, fashion model and beauty pageant titleholder who was the winner of the Miss Mondo Italia 2011 pageant that was held in Gallipoli, Apulia, on 11 June 2011. On 6 November of that year she represented Italy at the Miss World 2011 pageant in London, Great Britain, where she was placed in the Top 15.

Before Miss World, Tania had entered the Miss Italia 2010 pageant as Miss Sicilia, placing among the Top 10. Previously, she had won the Italian pageant Una Ragazza per il Cinema in 2008.

Tania has a degree in "foreign languages and literatures" and in 2019 has got a master in "Screenwriting and Audiovisual production". She is unusually tall at 183 cm (6 ft 0 in).

== Partial filmography ==
=== Cinema ===
- Paranormal Stories (2011)
- Tra la vita e la morte (2013)
- The Perfect Husband (2014)
- Mission Possible (2018)
- Picciridda - Con i piedi nella sabbia (2020)
- Governance - Il prezzo del potere (2021)
- L'altra Luna (2021)

=== Television ===
- Cacciatore: The Hunter (2018)
