= Jaya Ganga =

- Jaya, Fille du Gange
- Directed by: Vijay Singh
- Written by: Vijay Singh
- Based on: the novel Jaya Ganga, In Search Of the River Goddess by Vijay Singh
- Produced by: Vijay Singh; Silhouette Films
- Starring: Asil Rais; Smriti Mishra; Paula Klein
- Cinematography: Piyush Shah
- Edited by: Renu Saluja
- Music by: Vanraj Bhatia
- Release dates: January 1997 (India); 25 November 1998 (France)
- Running time: 85 min.
- Countries: India; France
- Language: Hindi with English / French subtitles

Jaya Ganga (French: Jaya, fille du Gange) is a feature film made by writer, filmmaker and screenplay writer Vijay Singh.

The film stars Asil Rais and Smriti Mishra as leads.

Based on Vijay Singh's first novel Jaya Ganga, In Search Of the River Goddess (French:Jaya Ganga, le Gange et son double) Penguin Delhi/London 1985. Rupa & Co. Delhi 2005, 2021. Ramsay Paris 1985; Ginkgo éditeur Paris 2005, Rajkamal Prakashan Delhi 2021, the film has been shot on locations across Northern India, including Gomukh, Gangotri, Rishikesh, Haridwar, Chunar, Benares, and also in Paris and Limours, France.

Showcased at several film festivals across the world, it was first screened at the Montreal International Film Festival in the official competition category. Its first screening in India was at the 27th International Film Festival of India in New Delhi in January 1996, and it was later released in other cities in 1997. Its releases in India and Europe got it critical and commercial success. This was also the debut for its lead actress Smriti Mishra.

== Plot ==
Nishant, a young Indian writer from Paris undertakes a journey along the river Ganges, right from its source in the Himalayas. Constantly haunted by the fantasy of a woman called Jaya from Paris, he meets Zehra, a poet and a dancer on the banks of the River Ganges. Zehra brings back the memory of Jaya and Nishant loses himself in her. Love takes over and he wants Zehra to be a part of his journey. While they are enjoying their journey, Nishant receives a telegram. And Zehra soon discovers how Nishant's fantasy could lead to a series of surprises....

== Cast ==
- Asil Rais - Nishant
- Smriti Mishra - Zehra
- Paula Klein - Jaya
- Vijay Singh- Sanjay
- Anupam Shyam - Bulldog
