= Pamela Rooks =

Indian film director and screenwriter

- Born: Pamela Juneja; 28 February 1958; Kolkata, India
- Died: 1 October 2010; New Delhi, India
- Occupations: film director, screenwriter
- Years active: 1992–2005
- Spouse: Conrad Rooks (div. 1985)

Pamela Rooks (28 February 1958 – 1 October 2010) was an Indian film director and screenwriter, most known for the film, Train to Pakistan (1998) set in Partition of India and based on Khushwant Singh's novel; it was screened at several international film festivals. Apart from that accomplishment she also made award-winning films like, Miss Beatty's Children (1992) and Dance Like a Man (2004) and several documentaries.

== Early life ==
She was born Pamela Juneja in an Army household to Col. A. N. Juneja and Gudi Juneja. She did her schooling in boarding schools in Nainital and Shimla, where she became interested in dramatics. Later, while studying mass communication in Delhi in the 1970s, she was involved with Delhi-based theatre group, Theatre Action Group (TAG), which was founded by theatre director, Barry John and Siddharth Basu, Roshan Seth, Lilette Dubey, and Mira Nair amongst others.

== Career ==
She started her career as a journalist and producer of current affairs programmes on television and it was during this period, for an interview, that she met director Conrad Rooks who had received much acclaim for his film, Siddhartha (1972). Subsequently they went on to marry.

Later this paved the way for her career as a documentary filmmaker and she made critically acclaimed documentaries, such as Chipko: A response to the forest crisis, Girl Child: fighting for survival, Punjab: a human tragedy and Indian cinema: the winds of change, before making her first feature film, Miss Beatty's Children (1992), based on a novel of the same name by her. The film won her the Indira Gandhi Award for Best Debut Film of a Director at the National Film Award. Then in 1998 came her much anticipated film based on writer Khushwant Singh's historical novel, Train to Pakistan (1956), set in the Partition of India in 1947, while previous attempts by other people to turn the novel into film had failed. The film ran into trouble with the Indian Censor Board, but was eventually released after going to a tribunal where only a few audio cuts were made.

Having seen playwright Mahesh Dattani's play Dance Like a Man, a friend, the late dancer Protima Bedi, who had also worked in his first film, arranged a meeting with Dattani in Bangalore. Rooks subsequently bought the rights to the play and went on co-write the screenplay with him. Her next venture, Dance Like a Man, was released in 2004. and won a National Film Award for Best Feature Film in English for 2003.

== Accident and death ==
In November 2005, she received a serious brain injury when a Maruti Alto lost control and collided with her Toyota Landcruiser at Vasant Kunj in Delhi while she was returning from Indira Gandhi International Airport after a trip to Amsterdam. She was subsequently put in a drug-induced coma and remained in that state for five years. She never recovered from the coma and died of cardiac arrest at her Defence Colony home in the early hours of 1 October 2010 at the age of 52.

== Personal life ==
She was married to director Conrad Rooks and the couple had a son, Ryan, before they divorced in 1985. Later she dated Maharajkumar Shrimant Shivaji Rao Holkar of Indore (Prince Richard Holkar), the son of HH Maharaja Yeshwant Rao II Holkar of Indore, whom she had first met in 1998 in her Defence Colony neighbourhood. In the following years they grew close and decided to be life companions.

Together Rooks and Holkar brought life back to Richard's ancestral home, Ahilya Fort in Maheshwar, and were the directors of Ahilya Hospitality and Travels Private Limited. Holkar was accompanying her during the 2005 car accident.

Richard Holkar joined the Indian Head Injury Foundation, founded in February 2007, by Gaj Singh, Maharaja of Jodhpur, whose son Shivraj Singh had received a serious head injury due to an accident on the polo grounds in Jaipur in February 2005.

== Filmography ==
Year	Title	Contribution	Notes
1992	Miss Beatty's Children	Director/Writer	National Film Award – Indira Gandhi Award for Best Debut Film of a Director
1998	Train to Pakistan	Director/Writer/Producer	Nominated – Best Film, Cinequest Film Festival
2004	Dance Like a Man	Director	National Film Award for Best Feature Film in English

== Works ==
- Miss Beatty's children, Clarion Books, 1989. ISBN 81-85120-35-8.
