= Miss Beatty's Children =

- Poster
- Directed by: Pamela Rooks
- Screenplay by: Pamela Rooks; James Killough
- Based on: Miss Beatty's Children by Pamela Rooks
- Produced by: NFDC; Doordarshan; Rooks AV
- Starring: Jenny Seagrove; Faith Brook; Protima Bedi
- Cinematography: Venu
- Edited by: Renu Saluja
- Music by: Zakir Hussain
- Release date: 1992
- Running time: 112 min.
- Country: India
- Language: English

Miss Beatty's Children is a 1992 English-language Indian drama film directed by Pamela Rooks in her directorial debut, with Jenny Seagrove, Faith Brook and Protima Bedi in lead roles. The film set in 1936 in South India, was based on Rooks' own novel of the same name.

At the 40th National Film Awards, the film won the award for Best Debut Film of a Director and the Best Cinematography.

== Plot ==
In 1936 in South India, Jane, an English schoolteacher comes to Trippuvur to work with Mabel Forster, a Christian missionary, who runs a mission school, and works towards young girls from being sold into temple prostitution. She has Kamla Devi, a senior temple woman as her opponent. Once when Mabel has gone away Jane finds herself trapped in a local controversy. She rescues an Anglo-Indian girl and takes her to Ooty, but back in the town she is accused of kidnapping. However she manages to find help with an American doctor, Alan Chandler. Eventually she adopts Amber, and rescues several more children.

== Cast ==
- Jenny Seagrove as Jane Beatty
- Faith Brook as Mabel Forster
- Protima Bedi as Kamla Devi
- D. W. Moffett as Alan Chandler
- Barry John
- Emma Sanderson
- Rituraj Singh
- Catherine Stevens
- Cecil Qadir

== Bibliography ==
- Pamela Rooks (1989). Miss Beatty's Children. Clarion Books. ISBN 8185120358.
