= Nirmal Pandey =

Indian actor

- Born: Rajkumar Pandey; 10 August 1962; Nainital, Uttarakhand, India
- Died: 18 February 2010 (aged 47); Mumbai, Maharashtra, India
- Occupation: Actor
- Spouse(s): Kausar Munir (1997–2000); Archana Sharma (2005–2010)

Nirmal Pandey (10 August 1962 – 18 February 2010) was an Indian actor known for his roles of Vikram Mallah in Shekhar Kapur's Bandit Queen (1994), and Dajjal in television series Hatim. He portrayed a transgender woman in Daayraa (1996) for which he won a Best Actress Valenti award in France. He also appeared in Train To Pakistan (1998) and Godmother (1999). He played the role of Kishan Bhatta in Malayalam language film Dubai (2001).

His last film, Lahore, was released on 19 March 2010, a month after his death. In May 2020, Film and TV director Anil Dubey and Theatre, Film Director, Producer, Writer and Social Activist Ravindra Chauhan alias Ravida established the Nirmal Pandey Smriti Nyas and Film Festival in the memory of Pandey. This film festival is organized annually on Pandey's birthday, 10 August.

== Early life and education ==
Born on 10 August 1962 in a Kumaoni family living in Nainital, then in Uttar Pradesh, Nirmal Pandey was educated at Almora and Nainital. He graduated from the National School of Drama, Delhi.

== Career ==
After leaving the National School of Drama he moved to London, with a theater group, Tara, performing plays like Heer Ranjha and Antigone, and acting in around 125 plays.

After doing two small roles, he was first noticed in Shekhar Kapur's Bandit Queen (1994). He received positive reviews for films like Amol Palekar's Daayra (Square Circle) (1996), Train To Pakistan (1998), Is Raat Ki Subah Nahin and Hum Tum Pe Marte Hain. He acted in movies like Laila, Pyaar Kiya Toh Darna Kya, One 2 ka 4 and Shikari and in several television serials, including Hatim, and Princess Dollie Aur Uska Magic Bag (2005).

In addition to being an actor, he was a singer, and released the album Jazba in 1999.

In 2002, he directed Andhayug, a Hindi play written by noted playwright Dharamvir Bharati, which follows the 18 days following the Mahabharata war. It had a cast of 70 actors, all of whom belonged to Sanvedna, a theatre group started by him in 1994.

Pandey had an acting institute, Fresh Talent Academy, in Ghaziabad, where he conducted theatre workshops.

== Awards and recognition ==
He holds an unusual record for winning a Best Actor award at the 1997 France's Valenciennes Film Festival for his portrayal of a transvestite in Amol Palekar's Daayraa (1996). He shared the Best Actor award with the female lead, Sonali Kulkarni, at the Valenciennes Film Festival (France, 1997).

== Biography ==
Filmmaker, Theatre, Film Director and Social Activist Ravindra Chauhan alias Ravida authored the biography of actor Nirmal Pandey.

== Film Festival ==
In May 2020, Film and TV director Anil Dubey and Filmmaker, Theatre, Film Director, Writer and Social Activist Ravindra Chauhan alias Ravida established the Nirmal Pandey Smriti Nyas and Film Festival in the memory of Pandey. This film festival is organized annually on Pandey's birthday, 10 August. Due to COVID-19 lockdown in India, the first film festival was held online 2020 in Etawah Uttar Pradesh and the second 2021 event was held in Etawah, Uttar Pradesh. In 2022, the third film festival was held Pandey's birthplace Nainital, Uttarakhand. In 2023, the fourth festival was organized in Lucknow, Uttar Pradesh. In 2024, the fifth festival was organized in Bhopal, Madhya Pradesh. In 2025, the six festival was organized in Cuttack, Orissa. In 2026 the seven film Festival Raipur Chhattisgarh.

== Death ==
Nirmal Pandey died at the age of 47 on 18 February 2010, from a heart attack in Mumbai.

== Filmography ==
=== Films ===
Year	Film	Role	Notes
1994	Bandit Queen	Vikram Mallah	
1996	Is Raat Ki Subah Nahin	Aditya	
1996	Daayraa	The Transvestite	
2008	Koi Bach Na Payega		
1997	Auzaar	Baba	
1998	Train To Pakistan	Jaggat Singh	
1998	Pyaar Kiya To Darna Kya	Thakur Vijay Singh	
1999	Jahan Tum Le Chalo	Shantanu Arya	
1999	Godmother	Jakhra	
1999	Hum Tum Pe Marte Hain	Dhananjay	
2000	Hadh Kar Di Aapne	Sanjay	
2000	Shikari	Vijayendra Singh Rawal	
2001	Dubai	Kishan Batta	Malayalam language film
2001	One 2 Ka 4	Krishan Kant Virmani	
2002	Deewangee	Abhijeet Mehta	
2003	Aanch	Kirti Thakur	
2003	Patth	Bhullar	
2005	Laila	Filmstar	
2008	Deshdrohi	Nagesh Kulkarni	
2008	Uladhaal	Tony	
2009	Mudrank: The Stamp		
2010	Kedi	Razzak Bhai	Telugu language film
2010	Lahore	Anwar Shaikh	Posthumous film

=== Television ===
Year	Title	Role
2003–2004	Hatim	Dajjal
2004	Son Pari	Zarakh
2005	Kkavyanjali	Navin Nanda
2005	Princess Dollie Aur Uska Magic Bag	King
2006	Lucky	Jaggani / Balthazar
2006	Sssshhh Phir Koi Hai...	Dacait
2008	Raajkumar Aaryyan	Senapati Bhujang
