= Philippe Reinhardt =

Swiss actor

Philippe Reinhardt (born 14 May 1981) is a Swiss actor.

== Early life ==
Philippe Reinhardt was born on 14 May 1981 in Zürich and grew up in Zürich. After attending acting classes in Munich, Hamburg and Zürich, he got his first stage-roles at German and Swiss theatres.

== Career ==
His first roles were for German television-series, but quickly followed by movie offers such as the German comedy 1½ Knights – In Search of the Ravishing Princess Herzelinde along star Til Schweiger. The same year he also starred in the Swiss film Champions. This was followed by a role in the disaster movie Factor 8 for German network ProSieben. He also got the lead role in the short film Der Zauberregen alongside German actress Alexandra Kamp. In Bern's Theater at the Effingerstrasse he was on stage for the play Sein oder Nichtsein. In 2010 he starred in the feature film Simplify your soul for the screenwriter and director Markus Boestfleisch. By 2012 he also started being cast in international productions, most notably Andrey Malyukov's historical World War II soccer-drama Match and Fedor Bondarchuk's 3D-production Stalingrad, which was Russia's official entry for the foreign-language Oscars in 2013.

He gained notoriety mainly through his starring role in The Groom, the most successful Russian film 2016 in Russia with 3 million moviegoers and more than 20 million viewers of the free-TV premiere.

In 2018 he played in the Russian war drama film Sobibor that is based on the real story that happened in 1943 in the Sobibor death camp in German-occupied Poland. The film was selected as the Russian entry for the Best Foreign Language Film at the 91st Academy Awards.

In 2021, Philippe Reinhardt starred in the 6th film of the ARD series Die Diplomatin, entitled Mord in St. Petersburg, in the role of a Russian spy.

== Personal life ==
Philippe Reinhardt lives in Berlin and Zürich.

== Partial filmography ==
- 2004: Querschläger
- 2004: The Love I Stole (Short) - Steffi
- 2005: Der siebte Gang
- 2005: Jean-Luc
- 2005: Hey Chef
- 2007: Military Academy - Norman
- 2007: Miss Luzifer (Short) - Teufelchen
- 2007-2008: SOKO 5113 (TV Series) - Verhandlungsführer / Gärtner
- 2007: Unter meinem Bett
- 2008: Der Schatten des Geldes
- 2008: Alarm für Cobra 11 – Die Autobahnpolizei (TV Series) - Türsteher (uncredited)
- 2008: 1½ Knights – In Search of the Ravishing Princess Herzelinde - Kettenhund
- 2009: Factor 8 (TV Movie) - Moritz
- 2009: Champions - Journalist
- 2010: The quartering act (Short) - Thomas
- 2010: Der Zauberregen (Short) - Max
- 2010: Die Mike-Lenn-Vision
- 2011: Da kommt Kalle (TV Series) - Sigmar Behrens
- 2012: Nachtexpress - Hoger
- 2012: Match - Max
- 2012: Overbooked – Leuchtturm, Leichen & Pasteten - Harald Bloch
- 2012: Выжить после
- 2013: Stalingrad - Gotfrid
- 2014: The Perfect Husband - Hans
- 2014: Simplify your soul - Karl Rothstein
- 2016: Ya uchitel - Kuns
- 2016: Erwartungen - Torsten
- 2016: Seitenwechsel - Mann in der Bar
- 2016: The Groom - Helmut
- 2017: Strassenkaiser - Adrian
- 2018: Sobibor - Siegfried Greitschus
- 2019: Conquest - Zims
- 2019: Love Made Easy - Erik
- 2019-2022: True North - Lüthi
- 2020: Bail
- 2020–2022: Contamin
- 2021: The Match - Henckel
- 2021: Die Diplomatin – Mord in St. Petersburg
- 2022: Diversant
