= Vijay Singh (filmmaker) =

Indian historian, writer and filmmaker

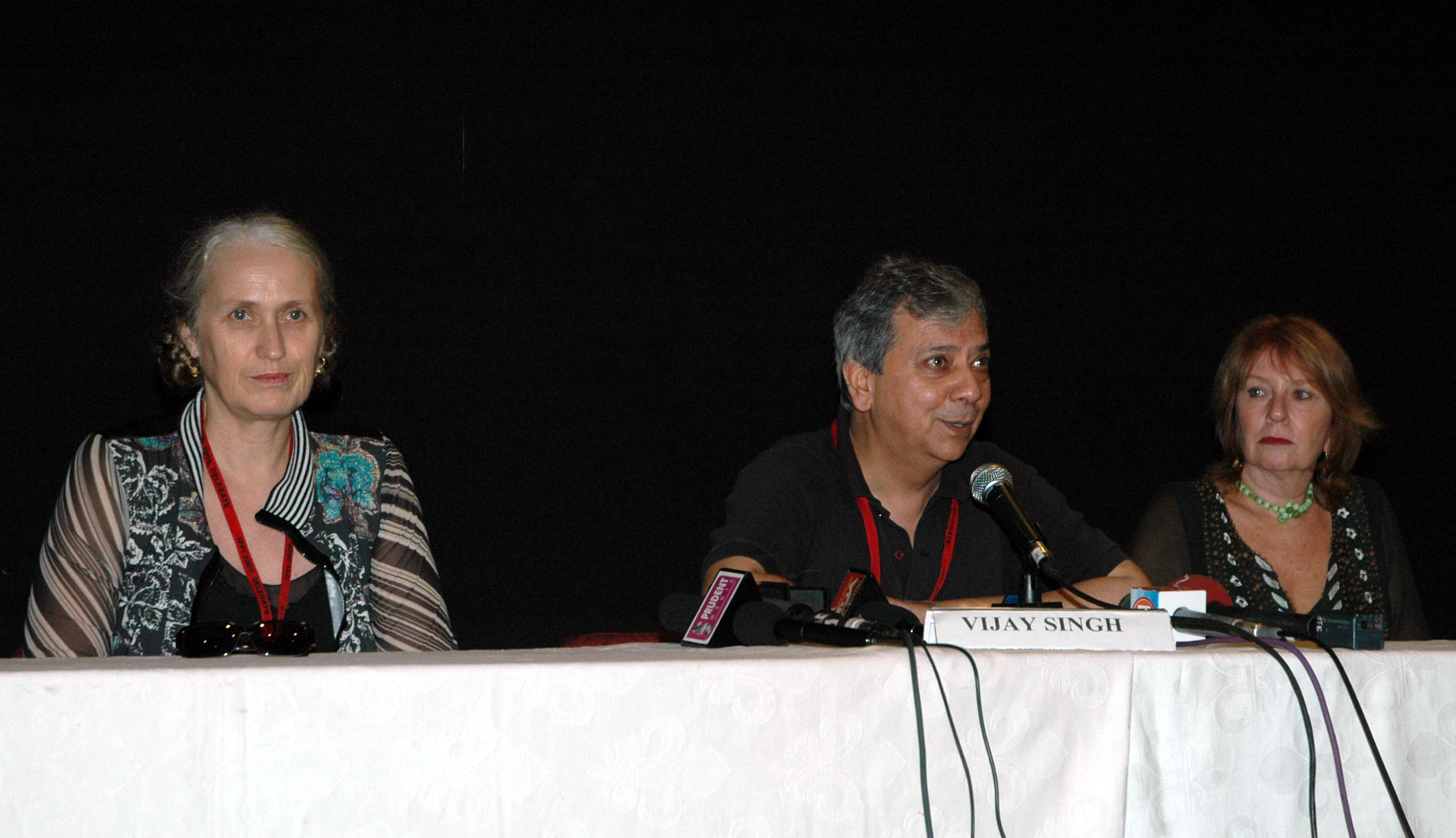
- Vijay Singh, IFFI (2006)
- Occupations: Historian, writer, filmmaker
- Website: www.vijaysingh.net

Vijay Singh is an Indian historian, writer and filmmaker based in Paris.

== Biography ==
Vijay Singh is a historian, writer, filmmaker and screenplay writer from India living in Paris. He was born to Kanwar Hari Singh, a surgeon, and Kanwarani Raksha Hari Singh.

Singh was awarded a Bachelor of Arts degree in history from St. Stephen's College, Delhi University and a Master of Arts degree in history from Jawaharlal Nehru University (JNU), New Delhi.

Inspired by French surrealism and André Breton, Vijay Singh moved to Paris in the early 1980s and enrolled for a PhD at the École des hautes études en sciences sociales.

== Career ==
=== Playwright ===
While still a student in New-Delhi, Vijay Singh wrote and directed a play Waiting for Beckett by Godot, followed by A Promenade on the Eyelashes of 1917.

=== Journalism ===
In the early eighties, Vijay Singh wrote a 20-page article which was published by Le Monde diplomatique. This was the start of his career as a journalist in France. He has written extensively for the French press, primarily Libération, Le Monde and Le Monde diplomatique on issues revolving around politics, culture, art and cinema, and also contributed articles to magazines and other international newspapers such as The Guardian and The Times of India.

In 1985, Singh co-presented a long programme with Frédéric Mitterrand on the Opening of the Année de l'Inde (India Year) on TF1, one of the main French TV channels.

=== Literary ===
While still a journalist, Vijay Singh wrote his first novel, Jaya Ganga, In Search of the River Goddess. The book was first published in France (Jaya Ganga, le Gange et son double, Ramsay, Paris 1985; Ginkgo, Paris 2005) before being published by Penguin Books India and UK, Rupa Publishers and Rajkamal Prakashan.

He subsequently wrote Whirlpool of Shadows (French: Tourbillon d’ombres), La Nuit Poignardée (The Wounded Night), and The River Goddess (French: La Déesse qui devint fleuve), a book for young readers.

His latest book, Gange, fleuve et déesse, in collaboration with Jacques Raymond (photography), was published by éditions de la Flandonnière, France in 2014.

Whirlpool of Shadows was listed by the Booker Prize winner Barry Unsworth in his column “Best Books of the UK” in The Sunday Times, 1992.

=== Films ===
Vijay has written and directed three feature films - the much acclaimed cult film Jaya Ganga (French: Jaya, fille du Gange) was released in France, the UK and India and shown at several major film festivals worldwide, often in the competition category. The music was composed by Vanraj Bhatia. His second feature film One Dollar Curry, a light-hearted comedy on immigration, was shot in Paris and released internationally. The film received wide press and media coverage. The music was composed by Zakir Hussain. His third film was Kabhie Ajnabi The

Vijay Singh has also written and directed the acclaimed films India by Song and Farewell My Indian Soldier (Adieu, mon soldat indien - first presented as Mademoiselle France pleure).

His documentary Chami and Ana the Elephant (Man and Elephant/ L'homme et l'éléphant) was first shown on the French television channel Canal + before being broadcast on some 100 televisions worldwide.

== Awards ==
- 2012: Vijay Singh awarded the "Director in Focus Award" at the Indian Film Festival of Ireland, Dublin.
- 2010: India by Song awarded the River to River Digichannel Audience Award 2010 for Best Documentary at the River to River 2010 Florence Indian Film Festival in Italy.
- 2010: Roll of Honour awarded by the Board of Governors of the Punjab Public School Nabha
- 2002: Le Grand Prix des Enfants "La Titine 2002", "Festival Pour Enfants du Film d'Animation et du Film Animalier", Carouge, Geneva, Switzerland for Chami and Ana (L'homme et l'éléphant)
- 1994:"Bourse Léonardo da Vinci" 1994 for the screenplay of Jaya Ganga
- 1990: Prix Villa Médicis hors les murs Award for foreign literature in 1990 for the novel Jaya Ganga, In Search of the River Goddess

== Bibliography ==
- Jaya Ganga, In Search of the River Goddess ( Penguin Books Delhi / London 1990; Rupa & Co Delhi 2005 and 2021; Rajkamal Prakashan (Hindi translation by Mangalesh Dabral), Delhi 2021;
- Jaya Ganga, le Gange et son double (Éditions Ramsay, Paris 1985; Ginkgo éditeur, Paris 2005 (French translation by Alain Porte);
- Whirlpool of Shadows (Jonathan Cape, London, 1992/ Rupa & Co, Delhi 2005) / Tourbillon d'ombres, Éditions Ramsay, Paris 1992)
- The River Goddess (Moonlight Publishing, London 1994) / La Déesse qui devint Fleuve (Gallimard Jeunesse, Paris 1993) /Een Godin Wordt Een Rivier (Zwijsen, the Netherlands 1994)/ Die Göttin, die sich in einen Fluss verwandelt (Kaufmann-Klett Germany 1994)
- La Nuit Poignardée (The Wounded Night) (Flammarion Groupe Flammarion Paris 1987)
- L'Inde (Éditions Autrement, Paris, 1986)
- Escales d'auteurs / Authors Places of Inspiration (Palais Éditions Paris 2001; co-author)
- A la Recherche du Pêché Sacré (In Search of the Sacred Sin). Short story co-authored with Gabriella Wright in Une première fois (Éditions du Seuil Paris 2004).
- Gange, fleuve et déesse, in collaboration with Jacques Raymond (photos), éditions de la Flandonnière, Cantal, France 2014

== Filmography ==
=== Feature films ===
- Jaya Ganga (based on the novel Jaya Ganga, In Search of the River Goddess): Shot in India and France, starring Smriti Mishra, Asil Rais, Paula Klein.
- One Dollar Curry: Shot in France, starring Gabriella Wright fr:Gabriella Wright, Vikram Chatwal, Trevor Stephens, Benoît Solès fr:Benoît Solès, Smriti Mishra, Lakshan Abenayake, Antoine Coloma, Aurélia Nolin, Partha Majumdar, Prem Puri, Thierry Pietra, Gerald Morales, Stéphanie Guieu, Eric Moreau, Bruno Philippe.

=== Documentaries ===
- Chami and Ana the Elephant/ Man and Elephant (L'homme et l'éléphant): Shot in Kerala, India.
- Shadi Lal, A Mystic Chef: Filmed in Paris, France for the French TV channel, France 3.
- India by Song: Filmed in India.
- Farewell My Indian Soldier (French: Adieu, mon soldat indien. First presented under the title 'Mademoiselle France pleure'): Filmed in India, France, Belgium and the UK.

=== Screenplays ===
- Shadi Lal, le cuisinier chef mystique
- Chami & Ana The Elephant (Man & Elephant)
- Jaya Ganga (based on the novel Jaya Ganga, In Search of the River Goddess)
- One Dollar Curry
- The Opium Symphony (based on the novel Whirlpool of Shadows)
- Bhopali
- India by Song
- Farewell My Indian Soldier
- Anoushka

== Theatre ==
- Waiting for Beckett by Godot (playwright, director).
- Hassan’s dreams (based on A Thousand and One Nights; contributor).
- A Promenade on the eyelashes of 1917 (playwright)

== Quotes ==
- "The beauty of man is often the child that lives on in him." (Source: The River Goddess)
- "Only humour can conquer death." (Source: One Dollar Curry)
- "To write is to meet solitude, face to face...nothing is more creative than a solitude where the presence of the other...is more present than ever..." (Source: Jaya Ganga, In Search of the River Goddess)
- "When reality is bitter, let life be a dream." (Source: India by Song)
- "Who is not a poet on earth? Some write with words, others write with silence." (Source: Jaya Ganga)
