= Sportstar =

Indian fortnightly sports magazine

- Editor: Ayon Sengupta
- Convergence Editor: V. V. Rajasekhara Rao
- Categories: Sports magazine
- Frequency: Fortnightly
- Founded: 1978; 48 years ago
- Country: India
- Based in: Chennai
- Website: Official website

Sportstar is an Indian monthly sports magazine published in India by the publishers of The Hindu. Its headquarters is in Chennai.

== History and profile ==
Sportstar was established in 1978. The magazine covers international sports, including the FIFA World Cup, UEFA Euro and the Olympics. It covers sports in India, including coverage of cricket, a widely popular sport in India. Additional coverage of sports includes football, tennis and Formula One Grand Prix.

From the 28 January 2006 issue, the magazine changed its name from The Sportstar to Sportstar and moved from magazine to tabloid format. In 2012 the magazine was redesigned. The new online avatar of Sportstar was launched on 26 October 2015 at the Madras Cricket Club.

It has its own mobile app named Sportstar - Live Sports & News.

They host the Sportstar Awards.
