= Kaleidoscope Entertainment =

Indian film and TV production company

- Type: Private
- Industry: Motion pictures
- Founded: 1989
- Headquarters: New Delhi, India
- Key people: Bobby Bedi, Managing Director
- Products: Motion pictures, Television programs, Production Services
- Website: www.kepl.in

Kaleidoscope Entertainment Pvt. Ltd. (or KEPL) is an Indian film and television production company. Films produced by them include Bandit Queen, Fire, Electric Moon, Saathiya, Maqbool, American Daylight, and Mangal Pandey: The Rising. Kaleidoscope is regarded as one of the leading production houses in the Indian film and television Industry, and one of the few that have created content that has successfully crossed over to western audiences.

KEPL was launched by independent film producer Bobby Bedi, who remains its owner and Managing Director.

KEPL has worked and is working with some notable talent in the Indian Movie industry from Pradeep Krishen Shekhar Kapur, Vishal Bhardwaj, Aamir Khan, Abbas Tyrewala to International stars such as Nusrat Fateh Ali Khan and A. R. Rahman Arundhati Roy Shah Rukh Khan and beyond.

Kaleidoscope Entertainment has also created the Mahabharata 360 Project, encompassing film, Television, Animation, Gaming and mobile products.

== Films ==
Year	Film	Director	Cast
2014	Mango	Abbas Tyrewala	Rannvijay Singh, Monali Thakur, Swara Bhaskar
2009	The Stoneman Murders	Manish Gupta	Kay Kay Menon, Arbaaz Khan, Rukhsar
2009	Chintuji	Ranjit Kapoor	Rishi Kapoor, Priyanshu Chatterjee
2005	Mangal Pandey: The Rising	Ketan Mehta	Aamir Khan, Rani Mukerji, Ameesha Patel, Toby Stephens
2004	American Daylight	Roger Christian	Nick Moran, Koel Purie
2004	Maqbool	Vishal Bhardwaj	Irrfan Khan, Pankaj Kapur
2002	Saathiya	Shaad Ali	Vivek Oberoi, Rani Mukerji
1997	Train to Pakistan	Pamela Rooks	Divya Dutta, Nirmal Pandey
1997	Stiff Upper Lips	Gary Sinyor	Peter Ustinov
1996	Fire	Deepa Mehta	Shabana Azmi, Nandita Das
1994	Bandit Queen	Shekhar Kapur	Seema Biswas, Nirmal Pandey
1992	Electric Moon	Pradeep Krishen	Leela Naidu, Naseeruddin Shah
1989	In Which Annie Gives it Those Ones	Pradeep Krishen	Shah Rukh Khan
