= Pallikoodam (disambiguation) =

Pallikoodam (പള്ളിക്കൂടം) is a word in Malayalam and Tamil that means 'school'.

Pallikoodam may also refer to:

- Pallikoodam (film), a Tamil film released in 2007
- Pallikoodam (school), a private school in Kottayam, Kerala founded by Mary Roy
