= Infinite justice =

Infinite Justice may refer to:

- Infinite Justice (film), a 2007 English film directed by Jamil Dehlavi
- Operation Enduring Freedom, the "military response to the September 11, 2001 attacks on the United States", initially planned to be named as Operation Infinite Justice
- The Algebra of Infinite Justice, a 2001 book of essays by Arundhati Roy
- ZGMF-X19A Infinite Justice Gundam, a fictional weapon from the Cosmic Era of the anime Gundam metaseries
