= 36th National Film Awards =

1989 Indian film award

- Awarded for: Best of Indian cinema in 1988
- Awarded by: Directorate of Film Festivals
- Presented by: R. Venkataraman (President of India)
- Presented on: 31 May 1989
- Official website: dff.nic.in

Highlights
- Best Feature Film: Piravi
- Best Non-Feature Film: Kanaka Purandara
- Best Book: The Moving Image
- Best Film Critic: Manmohan Chadha
- Dadasaheb Phalke Award: Ashok Kumar
- Most awards: Daasi (5)

The 36th National Film Awards, presented by Directorate of Film Festivals, the organisation set up by Indian Ministry of Information and Broadcasting, India to felicitate the best of Indian Cinema released in the year 1988. Ceremony took place in 1989.

== Awards ==
Awards were divided into feature films, non-feature films, and books written on Indian cinema.

=== Lifetime Achievement Award ===
| Award | Image | Awardee(s) | Awarded as | Awards |
|---|---|---|---|---|
| Dadasaheb Phalke Award | | Ashok Kumar | Actor | Swarna Kamal, ₹ 100,000 and a shawl |

=== Feature films ===
Feature films were awarded at All India as well as regional level. For 36th National Film Awards, a Malayalam film, Piravi won the National Film Award for Best Feature Film whereas a Telugu film, Daasi won the maximum number of awards (5). Following were the awards given in each category:

==== Juries ====
A committee headed by Tapan Sinha was appointed to evaluate the feature films awards. Following were the jury members:

- Jury members
  - Tapan Sinha (Chairperson) • Balu Mahendra • Bharathiraja • Bhaskar Chandavarkar • Bimal Dutt • Charu Kamal Hazarika • Dhira Biswal • Jatin Das • J. P. Das • Jayoo Patwardhan • Lakshmi Deepak • N. Lakshmi Narayan • Niranjan Roy • C. Radhakrishnan • V. Raja Krishnan • Vasant Chaudhury

==== All India Award ====
Following were the awards given:

===== Golden Lotus Award =====
Official name: Swarna Kamal

All awardees receive the Golden Lotus Award (Swarna Kamal), a certificate and cash prize.

| Award | Film | Language | Awardee(s) | Prize |
|---|---|---|---|---|
| Best Feature Film | Piravi | Malayalam | Producer: S. Jayachandran Nair | ₹ 50,000/- |
| Best Feature Film | Piravi | Malayalam | director: Shaji N. Karun | ₹ 25,000/- |
| Best Feature Film | Citation: For creative evocation of human pathos with refined cinematic sensitivity. | | | |
| Best Debut Film of a Director | Trishagni | Hindi | Producer and Director: Nabendu Ghosh | ₹ 25,000/- Each |
| Best Debut Film of a Director | Citation: For excellent exploration of complex philosophical theme for the first time in Indian cinema. | | | |
| Best Film Providing Popular and Wholesome Entertainment | Qayamat Se Qayamat Tak | Hindi / Urdu | Producer: M/s Nasir Hussain Films | ₹ 40,000/- |
| Best Film Providing Popular and Wholesome Entertainment | Qayamat Se Qayamat Tak | Hindi / Urdu | Director: Mansoor Khan | ₹ 20,000/- |
| Best Film Providing Popular and Wholesome Entertainment | Citation: For presenting fresh and clean charm on celluloid with discerning imagination. | | | |
| Best Children's Film | Manu Uncle | Malayalam | Producer: Joy Thomas | ₹ 30,000/- |
| Best Children's Film | Manu Uncle | Malayalam | Director: Dennis Joseph | ₹ 15,000/- |
| Best Children's Film | Citation: For endearing and hilarious picturisation which promotes a sense of adventure among children. | | | |
| Best Direction | Piravi | Malayalam | Shaji N. Karun | ₹ 50,000/- |
| Best Direction | Citation: For remarkable success in accomplishing fusion of various elements and creating new heights of cinematic aesthetics. | | | |

===== Silver Lotus Award =====
Official name: Rajat Kamal

All awardees receive the Silver Lotus Award (Rajat Kamal), a certificate and cash prize.

| Award | Film | Language | Awardee(s) | Prize |
|---|---|---|---|---|
| Best Feature Film on National Integration | Rudraveena | Telugu | Producer: Nagendra Babu | ₹ 30,000/- |
| Best Feature Film on National Integration | Rudraveena | Telugu | Director: K. Balachander | ₹ 15,000/- |
| Best Feature Film on National Integration | Citation: For presenting vertical as well as horizontal social integration on a musical plane and thus offering a cultural revolution as solution to maladies of the rural population. | | | |
| Best Film on Other Social Issues | Main Zinda Hoon | Hindi | Producer: NFDC and Doordarshan | ₹ 30,000/- |
| Best Film on Other Social Issues | Main Zinda Hoon | Hindi | Director: Sudhir Mishra | ₹ 15,000/- |
| Best Film on Other Social Issues | Citation: For portraying with redeemed finesse the saga of the agony of the middle class working woman. | | | |
| Best Actor | Piravi | Malayalam | Premji | ₹ 10,000/- |
| Best Actor | Citation: For excellence in restrained performance. | | | |
| Best Actress | Daasi | Telugu | Archana | ₹ 10,000/- |
| Best Actress | Citation: For the convincing portrayal of a 1925 Telanga Dasi girl who was subject to total exploitation. | | | |
| Best Supporting Actor | Raakh | Hindi | Pankaj Kapoor | ₹ 10,000/- |
| Best Supporting Actress | Ek Din Achanak | Hindi | Uttara Baokar | ₹ 10,000/- |
| Best Supporting Actress | Citation: For playing the difficult role of a wife caught in the midst of unique social and psychological predicament. | | | |
| Best Child Artist | Salaam Bombay! | Hindi | Shafiq Syed | ₹ 5,000/- |
| Best Child Artist | Citation: For the natural ease with which he has portrayed a slum child. | | | |
| Best Male Playback Singer | Rudraveena | Telugu | S. P. Balasubrahmanyam | ₹ 10,000/- |
| Best Male Playback Singer | Citation: For bringing playback singing a rare depth of emotion adorned by his command of classical idiom. | | | |
| Best Female Playback Singer | Vaishali | Malayalam | K. S. Chithra | ₹ 10,000/- |
| Best Female Playback Singer | Citation: For her clear and tuneful rendering of the song. | | | |
| Best Cinematography | Daasi | Telugu | Apurba Kishore Bir | ₹ 10,000/- |
| Best Cinematography | Citation: For high technical excellence and creative participation in evolving the basic statement. | | | |
| Best Screenplay | In Which Annie Gives It Those Ones | English | Arundhati Roy | ₹ 10,000/- |
| Best Screenplay | Citation: For capturing the anguish prevailing among students of professional institutions. | | | |
| Best Audiography | Piravi | Malayalam | T. Krishnan Unni | ₹ 10,000/- |
| Best Audiography | Citation: For creatively helping to capture and sustain the delicate seasonal and emotional mood of the film. | | | |
| Best Editing | Raakh | Hindi | A. Sreekar Prasad | ₹ 10,000/- |
| Best Editing | Citation: For his precise use of time and juxtaposition in bringing out creatively the internal turmoil of a modern youth. | | | |
| Best Art Direction | Daasi | Telugu | T. Vaikuntham | ₹ 10,000/- |
| Best Art Direction | Citation: For his minute care and concern for detail of prop and decor, creating a period locale which becomes an amalgamated part of the film enhancing its aesthetic value. | | | |
| Best Costume Design | Daasi | Telugu | Sudharshan | ₹ 10,000/- |
| Best Costume Design | Citation: For his tender handling of warped fabric and jewellery with correct hues and authenticity. | | | |
| Best Music Direction | Rudraveena | Telugu | Ilaiyaraaja | ₹ 10,000/- |
| Best Music Direction | Citation: For creating an innovative score which brings out the splendour of classical tradition and blends it beautifully with modern sensibilities. | | | |
| Best Lyrics | Vaishali | Malayalam | O. N. V. Kurup | ₹ 10,000/- |
| Best Lyrics | Citation: For the rare poetic heights reached in all lyrics in the film. | | | |
| Special Jury Award | Vasundhara | Hindi | Ashok Ahuja (director) | ₹ 5,000/- |
| Special Jury Award | Citation: For the sensitive and compulsive evolution of the much needed love for the eco-system and for defining the role of humanity in saving mankind and nature from devastation. | | | |
| Special Mention | • Qayamat Se Qayamat Tak • Raakh | Hindi | Aamir Khan (Actor) | Certificate only |
| Special Mention | Citation: For the imaginative, innovative and promising performance of character roles in the films. | | | |

==== Regional awards ====
The award is given to best film in the regional languages in India.

| Award | Film | Awardee(s) | Prize |
|---|---|---|---|
| Best Feature Film in Assamese | Kolahal | Producer: Bhabendra Nath Saikia | ₹ 20,000/- |
| Best Feature Film in Assamese | Kolahal | Director: Bhabendra Nath Saikia | ₹ 10,000/- |
| Best Feature Film in Assamese | Citation: For taking up the bold theme of the struggle of a deserted woman caught between convection and the desire to live. | | |
| Best Feature Film in Hindi | Salaam Bombay! | Producer: NFDC, Mirabai Films and Doordarshan | ₹ 20,000/- |
| Best Feature Film in Hindi | Salaam Bombay! | Director: Mira Nair | ₹ 10,000/- |
| Best Feature Film in Hindi | Citation: For exploring the tragic realities of life for the homeless children and women and those enmashed by drugs. | | |
| Best Feature Film in Kannada | Bannada Vesha | Producer: Doordarshan | ₹ 20,000/- |
| Best Feature Film in Kannada | Bannada Vesha | Director: Girish Kasaravalli | ₹ 10,000/- |
| Best Feature Film in Kannada | Citation: For superb blend of different departments of film-making to bring out lyrically the predicament of performing artiste and his quest for identity. | | |
| Best Feature Film in Malayalam | Rugmini | Producer: S. C. Pillai and Gigy Abraham | ₹ 20,000/- |
| Best Feature Film in Malayalam | Rugmini | Director: K. P. Kumaran | ₹ 10,000/- |
| Best Feature Film in Malayalam | Citation: For compassionate depiction of the human condition permeating the dark realities of a social evil. | | |
| Best Feature Film in Oriya | Kichi Smruti Kichi Anubhuti | Producer: K. Jagadeswari | ₹ 20,000/- |
| Best Feature Film in Oriya | Kichi Smruti Kichi Anubhuti | Director: Manmohan Mahapatra | ₹ 10,000/- |
| Best Feature Film in Oriya | Citation: For the cinematic depiction of the past, present and future of the psyche of a representative village. | | |
| Best Feature Film in Telugu | Daasi | Producer: B. Ramachandra Rao | ₹ 20,000/- |
| Best Feature Film in Telugu | Daasi | Director: B. Narsing Rao | ₹ 10,000/- |
| Best Feature Film in Telugu | Citation: For portraying the grim reality of a feaudal milieu through original and rare use of film language. | | |

Best Feature Film in Each of the Language Other Than Those Specified in the Schedule VIII of the Constitution

| Award | Film | Awardee(s) | Prize |
|---|---|---|---|
| Best Feature Film in English | In Which Annie Gives It Those Ones | Producer: Pradip Krishen | ₹ 20,000/- |
| Best Feature Film in English | In Which Annie Gives It Those Ones | Director: Pradip Krishen | ₹ 10,000/- |
| Best Feature Film in English | Citation: For portrayal of the agonies and aspiration of the present day student community in excellent cinematic language. | | |

=== Non-feature films ===
Short films made in any Indian language and certified by the Central Board of Film Certification as a documentary/newsreel/fiction are eligible for non-feature film section.

==== Juries ====
A committee headed by Homi Sethna was appointed to evaluate the non-feature films awards. Following were the jury members:

- Jury Members
  - Homi Sethna (Chairperson) • Jagmohan • Samiran Dutta • Ram Mohan • Rajiv Mehrotra

==== Golden Lotus Award ====
Official name: Swarna Kamal

All the awardees receive the Golden Lotus Award (Swarna Kamal), a certificate and cash prize.

| Award | Film | Language | Awardee(s) | Prize |
|---|---|---|---|---|
| Best Non-Feature Film | Kanaka Purandara | Kannada | Producer: Girish Karnad for Films Division; Director: Girish Karnad | ₹ 15,000/- Each |
| Best Non-Feature Film | Citation: For communicating, through the lives of Kanakadasa and Purandaradasa, the many facets of Bhakti, transcending all barriers of caste and creed, encompassing the love of man for man and man for God, using an [sic] unique fusion of different elements of cinema of the documentary genre. | | | |

==== Silver Lotus Award ====
Official name: Rajat Kamal

All the awardees receive the Silver Lotus Award (Rajat Kamal) and cash prize.

| Name of Award | Name of Film | Language | Awardee(s) | Cash prize |
|---|---|---|---|---|
| Best Anthropological / Ethnographic Film | Maa Ooru | Telugu | Producer: B. Ramachandra Rao; Director: B. Narsing Rao | ₹ 10,000/- Each |
| Best Anthropological / Ethnographic Film | Citation: For recalling with nostalgia the life of a village community of the fifties in Telangana and does so with sensitivity and a graphic lyricism. | | | |
| Best Arts / Cultural Film | Scroll Painters of Birbhum (Patua) | English | Producer: Dilip Ghosh and Biswanath Bose; Director: Raja Mitra | ₹ 10,000/- Each |
| Best Arts / Cultural Film | Citation: For portraying with sensitivity and insight the vanishing tribe of the Muslim scroll painters whose essentially secular art harmonises painting and singing. | | | |
| Best Scientific Film (including Environment and Ecology) | Reconstructive Surgery Leprosy (Hand) | English | Producer: Jal Mehta; Director: Anil Revankar | ₹ 10,000/- Each |
| Best Scientific Film (including Environment and Ecology) | Citation: For its meticulous and credible account of the reconstructive surgery on disfigured and disabled hands, evoking confidence in the scientific method and in indigenous endeavour. | | | |
| Best Industrial Film | The Duo | English | Producer and Director: Sanat Kumar Dasgupta | ₹ 10,000/- Each |
| Best Industrial Film | Citation: For capturing with economy and precision the mass production of ceramic and glassware in exquisite photographic detail. | | | |
| Best Agricultural Film | Seeds of Hope | English | Producer: M/s Eco Media Pvt Ltd. Director: Romulus Whitaker and Shekar Dattatri | ₹ 10,000/- Each |
| Best Agricultural Film | Citation: For its profound and intimate plea for afforestation, transcending the purely instructional aspects of the production of quality seeds and saplings. | | | |
| Best Film on Social Issues | Voices from Baliapal | English | Producer: M/s Vector Productions; Director: Vasudha Joshi and Ranjan Palit | ₹ 10,000/- Each |
| Best Film on Social Issues | Citation: For the meticulousness of its investigation and the clarity and conviction with which it carries the story of the non-violent resistance of the people of Baliapal against the establishing of a missile testing range of their rich and fertile lands. | | | |
| Best Educational / Motivational Film | Chitthi | Hindi | Producer: M/s Cinemart Foundation; Director: Suhasini Mulay | ₹ 10,000/- Each |
| Best Educational / Motivational Film | Citation: For its authentic and poignant enactment of the problem of illiteracy that is treated with compassion and gentle humour. | | | |
| Best News Review | More Than A Success Story (News Magazine No. 129) | English | Producer: Biren Das for Films Division; Director: K. B. Nair | ₹ 10,000/- Each |
| Best News Review | Citation: For going beyond the limitations of the news film format to tell the inspiring and moving stories of those who triumphed over their socio-economic circumstances and physical disabilities. | | | |
| Best Short Fiction Film | The Story of Tiblu | Idu Mishmi | Producer: Santosh Sivan for Films Division; Director: Santosh Sivan | ₹ 10,000/- Each |
| Best Short Fiction Film | Citation: For telling the story of a spirited young tribal girl who comes into her own in the alien environment of an urban school, while retaining the innocence and sensitivity bred of living close to nature; and for capturing the freshness and spontaneity of its tribal actors in real life locations with enduring simplicity. | | | |
| Best Film on Family Welfare | Lacchmi | Hindi | Producer: K. K. Garg for Films Division; Director: Om Prakash Sharma | ₹ 10,000/- Each |
| Best Film on Family Welfare | Citation: For weaving a powerful family welfare message into a credible story told simply and gently. | | | ₹ 10,000/- Each |
| Best Film on Family Welfare | Nirnay | Hindi | Producer: B. R. Shedge for Films Division; Director: R. R. Swamy | ₹ 10,000/- Each |
| Best Film on Family Welfare | Citation: For the clarity and simplicity with which, making effective use of both animation and live action, it communicates aspects of sterilisation, evoking confidence in its procedures. | | | ₹ 10,000/- Each |
| Special Jury Award | Before My Eyes | Only Music | Mani Kaul | ₹ 5,000/- |
| Special Jury Award | Citation: For capturing the texture of Kashmir's landscape with a rare control over cinematic form that combines visual poetry with an effective use of sound on a track that uses no commentary. | | | |
| Special Mention | Dispossession | English | N. H. Prasad | Certificate Only |
| Special Mention | Citation: For its fresh and innovative experimentation with cinematic form, dealing with an unusual theme. | | | |

=== Best Writing on Cinema ===
The awards aim at encouraging study and appreciation of cinema as an art form and dissemination of information and critical appreciation of this art-form through publication of books, articles, reviews etc.

==== Juries ====
A committee headed by Chidananda Dasgupta was appointed to evaluate the writing on Indian cinema. Following were the jury members:

- Jury Members
  - Chidananda Dasgupta (Chairperson) • M. F. Thomas • Vinod Tiwari

==== Silver Lotus Award ====
Official name: Rajat Kamal

All the awardees receive the Silver Lotus Award (Rajat Kamal) and cash prize.

| Award | Book | Language | Awardee(s) | Prize |
|---|---|---|---|---|
| Best Book on Cinema | The Moving Image | English | Author: Kishore Vallicha; Publisher: Orient Longman | ₹ 10,000/- |
| Best Book on Cinema | Citation: For its analytic insights and its plausible theoretical framework. | | | |
| Best Film Critic | | Hindi | Manmohan Chadha | ₹ 5,000/- |
| Best Film Critic | Citation: For the seriousness of his approach and the wide compass of his thoughts. | | | |

=== Awards not given ===
Following were the awards not given as no film was found to be suitable for the award:

- Second Best Feature Film
- Best Film on Family Welfare
- Best Biographical Film
- Best Exploration / Adventure Film
- Best Animation Film
- Best Historical Reconstruction/Compilation Film
- Best Feature Film in Bengali
- Best Feature Film in Manipuri
- Best Feature Film in Marathi
- Best Feature Film in Punjabi
- Best Feature Film in Tamil
- Best Promotional Film
