= Hotel California (film) =

2013 Malayalam comedy caper film

- Poster
- Directed by: Aji John
- Written by: Anoop Menon
- Produced by: Josemon Simon
- Starring: Jayasurya; Anoop Menon; Honey Rose; Maria Roy; Aparna Nair
- Cinematography: Jithu Damodar
- Edited by: Zian Sreekanth
- Music by: Shaan Rahman
- Production company: HASH cinema
- Distributed by: Jairaj Release
- Release date: 3 May 2013
- Country: India
- Language: Malayalam

Hotel California is a 2013 Indian Malayalam-language crime caper film directed by Aji John and written by Anoop Menon. It stars Jayasurya, Anoop Menon, Saiju Kurup, Shankar Panikkar, Joju George, Honey Rose, Maria Roy and Aparna Nair. The film is produced by Josemon Simon under the banner of Jairaj Films and features music composed by Shaan Rahman, cinematography by Jithu Damodar and editing by Xian. The film's title is derived from a song by the Eagles. It was released on 3 May 2013, to mixed reviews.

== Plot ==
The film begins with the City Police Commissioner Bharath Chandran jumping over the compound wall of a house who is having an affair with the house owner's wife. The house owner confronts the commissioner and beats and breaks his arm. It then shifts to a man at a friend's house asking where his friend and a don named Jimmy are, as there is work for him to do for the man. He reveals his work is to transport the counterfeit DVD of the upcoming releasing movie Hotel California and in which Jimmy has to transport it through the airport safely. It shifts to Kamala Nambiar a dancer practising dance receives a call informing that what she ordered is ready (It is not revealed what she ordered to audiences). It once again shifts to Aby Mathew a lusting married middle aged man, who contacts a pimp to have sex with a television actress named Swapna Joseph who agrees to have sex with him for a large sum of money. Then Sasi Pillai is shown talking about a hot topic for news reporting about the don named Airport Jimmy. In which it shifts to the scene of Airport Jimmy in high class bar.

== Cast ==
- Jayasurya as Sulfur Jimmy alias Airport Jimmy
- Anoop Menon as Superstar Prem Sagar
- Honey Rose as Swapna Joseph
- Saiju Kurup in a dual role as:
  - Tarun Singh Deol
  - Rafeeq Kunjahammed
- Nikhil as Rafeeq Ahammed
- Maria Roy as Kamala Nambiar
- Shankar as Aby Mathew
- Joju George as Bharath Chandran IPS
- P. Balachandran as Sasi Pillai
- Nandu
- Krishna as Rashid
- Sruthi Lakshmi as Linda Tharakan
- Thesni Khan as Sherly
- Sadiq as Ali
- Aparna Nair as Deepa Pillai
- Babu Namboothiri as Koshi
- Manikuttan as Sharat
- Sukumari as Rafeeq's mother
- Sudheesh as Bavutty
- Narayanankutty as Police Officer
- Nobi as Benny
- Krishna Praba
- Deepak Nair as Jiyad
- Deepu Parassala
- Kavitha Nair
- Romanch as Director Linguswamy
- Shibu Laban as Shibu
- Arun
- Kani Kusruti in a guest role
- Aji John as John

== Production ==
The combination of Anoop Menon and Jayasurya was joined again for the film named Pushpakavimaanam, which is scripted by Anoop. The film was announced after the duo's Beautiful, and was supposed to be directed by V.K. Prakash. Prakash was initially chosen to direct the film after the 2011 film Beautiful. The director V.K. Prakash felt that such a big film wouldn't begun so soon, thus Anoop Menon bringing forth the script of Trivandrum Lodge for the director to start. With the director opting to helm Trivandrum Lodge, Aji John was now chosen to direct Pushpakavimaanam. Jayasurya and Anoop Menon were already announced but many actors had been considered for the female lead roles and supporting roles in the film. Roma had opted out the role from Hotel California.

The producers of the film had already set aside 2.5 million just for the shots inside aeroplanes and in airports. ₹60,000 was spent an hour for shooting in aeroplanes. Not many Malayalam films have been shot inside aeroplanes due to the formalities and the heavy expenses involved. The film's airport scenes in Kerala were shot in Cochin International Airport in January 2013. The makers had set aside an extra 2.5 million for the shoot, since they will require five to six days of shoot; six to seven hours a day. The crew had earlier checked out the aeroplane set at the Ramoji Film City, but what the crew were looking for were something bigger. The film's story unfolds in the business class of the plane.

== Soundtrack ==
The music was composed by Shaan Rahman. Lyrics were written by Anoop Menon.

Track listing
No.	Title	Singer(s)	Length
1.	"Ee Raavin"	Shaan Rahman
2.	"Manju Theerum"	Vijay Yesudas
3.	"Njaanoru Vedan"	Shaan Rahman
4.	"Welcome to Hotel California" (instrumental)	–

== Reception ==
Aswin J Kumar of The Times of India rated the film 2.5 out of 5 stars and wrote, "Hotel California might be able to generate a few chuckles even with its lewd taste. But when it comes to loving a film as a whole, it falls flat". Paresh C Palicha of Rediff.com rated the film one out of five stars and wrote, "Hotel California has no plot and look like a half baked effort from director Ali John".
