= Maria Roy =

Indian actress

- Born: 7 November 1987 (age 38); Kottayam, Kerala, India
- Occupations: Actor; Model; Dancer
- Years active: 2006–2013
- Father: Lalit Roy
- Relatives: Arundhati Roy (aunt); Mary Roy (grandmother)

Maria Roy (born 7 November 1987) is an Indian former actress who entered the Malayalam film industry in late 2006. She is the niece of Booker Prize winner Arundhati Roy. She is married to Samit Scaria.

== Career ==
Maria is a South Indian film actress who worked primarily in the Malayalam film industry. Her debut movie was Notebook, directed by Rosshan Andrrews, in which she played a schoolgirl named Sridevi.

She spent six years in the UK and New York for detailed studies in different dance styles.

== Films ==
In Notebook, she was cast as Sreedevi, the relatively quiet girl of the three friends in the film, who dies midway through. Her second role was in the 2013 Malayalam film Hotel California, with Jayasurya.\

== Personal life ==
She is the granddaughter of Mary Roy, and niece of Arundhati Roy. She is married to Samit Scaria.

== Filmography ==
Year	Title	Role	Co-stars	Director	Notes
2003	Achante Kochumol			Rajan P. Dev	Debut film
2006	Notebook	Sreedevi	Roma, Parvathy, Skanda Ashok	Rosshan Andrrews	
2008	Bullet				
2011	The Filmstaar	Herself		Sanjeev Raj	Archive footage Cameo
2013	Hotel California	Kamala Nambiar	Jayasurya, Anoop Menon, Honey Rose	Aji John	
2013	Mumbai Police	Captain Srinivas's wife	Prithviraj, Jayasurya, Rahman,	Rosshan Andrrews	Cameo appearance
