= Mary Roy =

Indian educator and activist (1933–2022)

- Born: 7 November 1933; Aymanam, Kingdom of Travancore, British India
- Died: 1 September 2022 (aged 88); Kottayam, Kerala, India
- Occupations: Educator, women's rights activist
- Relatives: Arundhati Roy (daughter); Maria Roy (granddaughter)

Mary Roy (7 November 1933 – 1 September 2022) was an Indian educator and women's rights activist known for winning a Supreme Court lawsuit in 1986 against the inheritance law prevalent within the Syrian Malabar Nasrani (or Syrian Christian) community of Kerala. The judgement ensured equal rights for Syrian Christian women as with their male siblings in their ancestral property. Until then, the Syrian Christian community in Kerala were subject to the provisions of the Travancore Christian Succession Act of 1916 and the Cochin Succession Act, 1921 (the kingdoms of Travancore and Cochin being predecessors to the state of Kerala), while elsewhere in India the same community was subject to the Indian Succession Act of 1925.

Mary Roy was denied her share of the familial property due to the Travancore Christian Succession Act of 1916. She sued her brother after her father's death for equal inheritance. In the case Mary Roy Etc v State of Kerala and Others which was heard by the Supreme Court of India in 1986, she won the case against her brother.

She was the founder-director of Pallikoodam (formerly Corpus Christi High School) at Kalathilpady, a suburb of Kottayam, in the state of Kerala. Her daughter is the Booker Prize winning author Arundhati Roy.

== Mary Roy Etc v State of Kerala and Others ==
Mary Roy Etc v State of Kerala and Others is considered a landmark case in the Supreme Court of India that brought equal rights for Syrian Christian women in India as their male siblings on matters of inheritance. The women of the Syrian Christian community could not inherit property because of the Travancore Christian Succession Act of 1916. As laid out in this act, Syrian Christian women could inherit property but would only be paid the lesser of one quarter of a son's inheritance or 5,000 rupees as what was referred to as sthreedhanam (transl. dowry). Contesting this, Roy filed the case against George Isaac, her brother, after the demise of her father P. V. Isaac in 1960. She sued her brother to gain equal access to the inheritance left to them. The lower court at first rejected her plea. The property was divided into two parts—the Kottayam property which was spread over two locales and another at Nattakom Grama Panchayath. The case was considered a landmark case for the reason it fought for equal property rights for Syrian Christian women.

When the case was taken up by the Supreme Court of India, a bench led by Justice P. N. Bhagwati and Justice R. S. Pathak heard the case and delivered the judgement in 1986. While the judgement was in Roy's favor, it did not address the case as violation Article 14 of the Constitution of India which guaranteed gender equality. Instead, the judgement was based on the fact that The Part B States (Laws) Act, 1951, extended national laws to Part B states, which were princely states that were integrated into the union of India. This extension implied that the Travancore Christian Succession Act was invalid after 1951 and was superseded by the Indian Succession Act of 1925. The verdict was applicable retroactively and found opposition from multiple groups that believed that the retroactive nature of the verdict would open up the floodgates for litigations either arising from property inheritance or even properties pledged for loans with the banks. Roy was represented by advocate Indira Jaising, herself a women's right activist.

A bill was introduced by P. J. Kurien from the Congress party in the parliament to undo the retrospective application which did not find much support. A subsequent bill from the Kerala government under K. Karunakaran, Travancore and Cochin Succession (Revival and Validation) Bill did not receive presidential assent. A subsequent motion in the Supreme Court was also dismissed. Though she won the case, Roy did not get access to the property because a district court ruled that division of the property was not possible. Roy approached the Kerala High Court in 1994 to get the lower court's judgement overruled. She was successful. After her mother's death in 2000, she approached the Kottayam Sub-court for the final decree. The case continued for eight years after which she filed the execution petition in 2009, and she finally received the property in 2010. It is noted that her share of the property was ₹2 crores, an amount that she left to charity.

== Other initiatives ==
Roy was the founder-director of Pallikoodam (formerly Corpus Christi High School) at Kalathilpady, a suburb of Kottayam town in the state of Kerala.

== Personal life ==
Mary Roy was the daughter of P. V. Isaac, an entomologist who trained in England under Harold Maxwell-Lefroy and became Imperial Entomologist at the Pusa Institute, and his wife Susy Isaac. She was born in 1933 and was the youngest among four siblings in the family. In a personal interview with The Times of India, she disclosed personal details about her life. She admitted to having a complicated relationship with her elder brother George, whom she would later sue over property inheritance. She grew up in Delhi where she completed her schooling before going to Madras (present day Chennai) to obtain a degree. She later moved to Calcutta and worked as a company secretary. She married Rajeeb Roy, a Bengali Christian tea plantation manager in Shillong. The marriage was said to have been an abusive relationship, which ended in a divorce.

Roy had two children: a son, Lalit Kumar Christopher Roy, and a daughter, Arundhati Roy who is a Booker Prize winning author. Her granddaughter, Maria Roy, Lalit's daughter, is a former actress who is known for her role in the film Notebook.

The God of Small Things, written by Arundhati Roy, has a character, Ammu, who was based on her mother, Mary. Mary confirmed she was very similar to the character her daughter wrote; however, she was never involved with a man of a lower caste nor was she married to a Hindu drunkard, as was the case in the book. In the interview, she details how Arundhati declared independence from her mother and both had a strained relationship for that particular period. However, she declared she was proud of Arundhati's accomplishments and did not expect that she would win the Man Booker Prize.

Roy died in Kottayam on 1 September 2022, after a long period of age-related illness. In 2025, Arundhati Roy released her memoir, Mother Mary Comes to Me, about their relationship.
