= The Algebra of Infinite Justice =

2001 collection of essays written by Arundhati Roy

- First UK edition
- Author: Arundhati Roy
- Publisher: HarperCollins, Penguin India
- Publication date: 2001

The Algebra of Infinite Justice (2001) is a collection of essays written by Booker Prize winner Arundhati Roy. The book discusses a wide range of issues including political euphoria in India over its successful nuclear bomb tests, the effect of public works projects on the environment, the influence of foreign multinational companies on policy in poorer countries, and the "war on terror". Some of the essays in the collection were republished later, along with later writing, in her book My Seditious Heart.

== Essays ==
=== The end of Imagination ===
This is the name of the first essay in the 2001 book. It was later used as the title of a comprehensive collection of Roy's essays in 2016.

=== The greater common good ===
Essay concerning the controversial Sardar Sarovar Dam project in India's Narmada Valley.

=== Power politics ===
This essay examines Indian dam construction and challenges the idea that only "experts" can influence economic policy. It explores the human costs of the privatization of India’s power supply and the construction of monumental dams in India. This is the second essay in the original 2001 book. There is also a 2002 book of Roy's essays with the title Power Politics.

=== The ladies have feelings so... ===
Source:

=== War is peace ===
In this essay, Roy contends that the world need not have to choose between the Taliban and the US government. She maintains that all the beauty of the world — literature, music, art — lies between these two fundamentalist poles.

=== Democracy Who’s She When She’s at Home ===
This essay examines the communal violence in Gujarat.

=== War talk Summer Games with Nuclear Bombs’ ===
When India and Pakistan conducted their nuclear tests in 1998 hypocrisy of Western nuclear powers, implicitly racist, denunciation of the tests. Roy explores the double standard while she finds nuclear weapons unspeakable. Her final sentence is: Why do we tolerate these men who use nuclear weapons to blackmail the entire human race?

== Reception ==
Mithu C Banerji, in a review in The Observer (2002), stated:

Roy's writing reflects her fiction, and meanders between polemic and sentiment. Yet whether she is talking about the 'death of my world' or about 'one country's terrorist being another's freedom fighter', she is always passionately intense.

S. Prasannarajan of India Today said:

...marvel at the italicised banality of her text, its remoteness from the context. This is the rebel without a context, and no textual exaggeration, assisted by, apart from the italics, exclamation marks and question marks, can camouflage the desperation of a dissident in search of a situation.

Mehraan Zaidi of Hindustan times said:

Today in this world there are very few people who have the power and skill to change the way you look towards life through their writings. Arundhati Roy is one of them. The Algebra of Infinite Justice is a fitting example. It contains the best of Arundhati Roy’s political writings.

Roy was awarded the Sahitya Akademi Award in English for this work, but refused it citing her opposition to policies of the Indian government.

== Editions ==
- ISBN 0-14-302907-X (Penguin India)
- ISBN 0-00-714949-2 (Harper Collins)
- Mera Edition in Urdu (Amal Mohan)
- Hindi translation of this book is also available under the title - Nyaay Ka Ganit (न्याय का गणित). ISBN 81-267-1074-8. OCLC 500351747. (Rajkamal Prakashan)
