= The Shape of the Beast =

Book by Arundhati Roy

The Shape of the Beast: Conversations with Arundhati Roy
- First edition
- Author: Arundhati Roy
- Language: English
- Genre: Interviews
- Publisher: Viking
- Publication date: 2008
- Publication place: India
- Media type: Print
- ISBN: 978-0-670-08207-0

The Shape of the Beast: Conversations with Arundhati Roy (2008) is a collection of fourteen interviews of Indian author Arundhati Roy, conducted between January 2001 and March 2008. In these interviews, Roy speaks, among other things, about people displaced by dams and industry, the genocide in Gujarat, Maoist rebels, the issues of Kashmir and American imperialism. In the final interview, Roy speaks about herself as a person, a writer and a celebrity.

Roy writes in the book's preface: "These interviews were a flexible way of thinking aloud, of exploring idea, personal As well as political, without having to nail them down with an artificially structured cohesion and fit them into an unassailable grand thesis. This book was born and raised in that amorphous, luminal space – somewhere between the spoken and the written word."

Five of the fourteen conversations are with David Barsamian, an American radio broadcaster, writer, and the founder and director of Colorado-based syndicated weekly talk program Alternative Radio. In 2004, Barsamian and Roy had co-authored a similar book The Checkbook and the Cruise Missile: Conversations with Arundhati Roy. Other interviewers include N. Ram of The Hindu, Shoma Chaudhury of Tehelka and Anthony Armove of International Socialist Review.

== Contents ==
- Scimitars in the Sun
  - Scimitars in the Sun: In Conversation with N. Ram (Online text)
- The Chequebook and the Cruise Missile
  - The Colonisation of Knowledge: In Conversation with David Barsamian (Online text)
  - Terror and the Maddened King: In Conversation with David Barsamian
  - Globalisation of Dissent: In Conversation with David Barsamian
  - Seize the Time: In Conversation with David Barsamian (Online text)
- The Shape of the Beast
  - The Outline of the Beast: In Conversation with Anthony Arnove (Online text)
  - The War that Never Ends: In Conversation with Anthony Arnove (Online text)
- Independence Day Special: In Conversation with S. Anand (Online text)
- The Question of Violence: In Conversation with Amit Sengupta (Online text)
- I Hope Kashmir Will Be In All Books I Write: In Conversation with P. G. Rasool (Online text)
- There’s a Fury Building Up: In Conversation with Shoma Chaudhury (Online text (subscription required))
- Choosing Our Weapons: In Conversation with Shoma Chaudhury (Online text)
- The Terror Puzzle: In Conversation with Shoma Chaudhury (Online text)
- Ten Years On…: In Conversation with Shoma Chaudhury (Online text)

== Reviews ==
Priscilla Jebaraj of The Hindu notes that The Shape of the Beast is an exercise in connecting the many dots that she first started plotting over a decade ago in The God of Small Things." "By compiling those [previously published] interviews together, the book documents the process of taking stock — of both past and future — and in typical Roy fashion, it looks at national and international developments through the lens of personal passion, providing adequate fodder for both the fan and the political scientist." Sharanya Manivannan wrote in The New Indian Express: "The Beast in question is, naturally, a political animal. In these interviews, Roy takes on, in her penetratingly poetic manner, the hegemonies of state, religion, imperialism, corporate entities and social constructs. All of them have been published before, so in themselves they say nothing new. But collected together they shed light not so much on the nature of the Beasts that democracy, egalitarianism and sheer goodness are up against, but on the woman who dares to outline their shapes." John Andrews of the South African magazine Amandla! wrote: "Unabashedly political, this is also a deeply personal collection that talks about the necessity of taking a stand and about the dilemma of guarding the private space necessary for writing in a world that demands urgent, unequivocal intervention."
