= Mother Mary Comes to Me =

2025 memoir by Arundhati Roy

- Author: Arundhati Roy
- Audio read by: Arundhati Roy
- Language: English
- Genre: Memoir
- Publisher: Hamish Hamilton
- Publication date: 28 August 2025
- Publication place: Gurugram
- Media type: Print (hardback)
- Pages: 374
- ISBN: 9780143473060
- OCLC: 1553738809
- Dewey Decimal: 823.914
- LC Class: PR9499.3.R59 Z46 2025

Mother Mary Comes to Me is a memoir by Arundhati Roy published in 2025.

== Summary ==
It is centred on the eventful life of her mother Mary Roy, who is "sharp, restless and charismatic, a visionary ruling with an iron fist" and Arundhati Roy's relations with her. In the author's own words, it is "about my relationship with my mother, about how she made me the kind of writer that I am - and then resented it". However, the book is also "a search for the roots of Roy’s own evolution into a writer". One commentator termed it a "biography cum autobiography of two remarkable women".

== Reception ==
The book received wide reviews published in leading newspapers and magazines, including the Financial Times, The New York Times, The Guardian, The New Yorker, The Times Literary Supplement, The Hindu, and The Straits Times, to cite a few. The New York Times included the work in their list of the ten Best Books of 2025.

John Reed in a review published in the Financial Times commented: "The book has the lyricism of Gabriel García Márquez, the political sweep of Barbara Kingsolver, and the antic family humour of David Sedaris. There is not an ounce of self-pity in it." Amit Chaudhari in a review published by The Guardian found the book to be "brave and absorbing," noting that Roy’s account of her mother has a "wonderful, self-assured self-sufficiency." He found the prose "unexpectedly funny" despite the heavy subject matter. Alexandra Jacobs, in a review in The New York Times, praised the memoir as "sturdy and polished". She noted that Roy does not soften the "abrasive presence" of her mother, Mary Roy, presenting her both as "shelter and storm."

In a starred review, Kirkus Reviews described the book as "an intimate, stirring chronicle" that revives "...the tangled complexities of filial love".

== Awards ==
Arundhati Roy won the 2025 National Book Critics Circle Award (for biography) for the book. She also received Mathrubhumi Book of the Year Award 2026 for the work. Mathrubhumi praised her "ability to distill profound emotional complexity into powerful prose". It added that, "her writing combines clarity with intensity". Accepting the award, Roy described the book as the most difficult one she has written. She said that, "much of it was written at night and revisited the next morning", as she "grappled with some of (her) deepest fears and emotions".

The book was a finalist for the 2025 Kirkus Prize for Nonfiction. It is shortlisted for the 2026 Women's Prize for Non-Fiction.
