= Barry John (theatre director) =

English-Indian theatre director (born 1944)

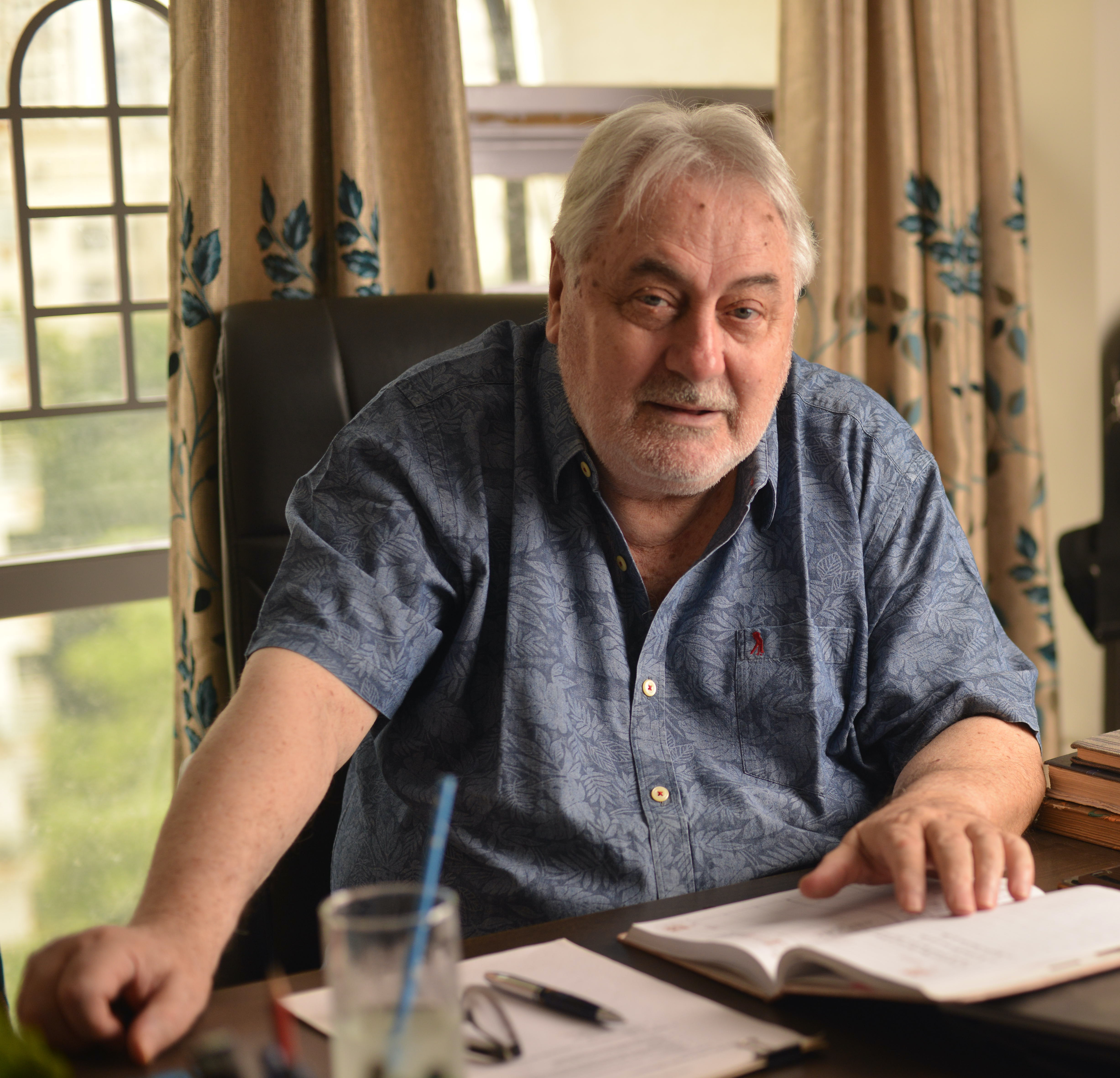
- John in September 2022
- Born: February 2, 1944 (age 82); Coventry, England
- Citizenship: United Kingdom (1944–2012); India (2012–present)
- Occupations: Theatre director; actor; writer; acting coach
- Awards: Sahitya Kala Parishad Award (1990-91); Sangeet Natak Akademi Award (1993); Padma Shri (2005)

Dr. Barry John (born 2 February 1946) is an English-Indian theatre director, actor, and acting coach. Some of his students became Bollywood actors including Shah Rukh Khan, Manoj Bajpayee, Varun Dhawan, Dulquer Salmaan, Kunal Kapoor, Rana Daggubati, Samir Soni, Shiney Ahuja and Aneesh Sharma and actresses, such as Jacqueline Fernandez, Richa Chadha, Dia Mirza, and Plabita Borthakur, as well as Hollywood actors including Freida Pinto and one of the top 10 US media companies CEO Samir Arora. He has been based in India since 1969. After moving to Mumbai, his acting school was opened in Mumbai as 'The Barry John Acting Studio ', which he quit and started another by the name 'The Free Birds Collective ', situated in Andheri, Mumbai.

He was awarded the 1993 Sangeet Natak Akademi Award for Theatre Direction by Sangeet Natak Akademi, India's National Academy for Music, Dance and Theatre, and also the Sahitya Kala Parishad Award. In January 2025, Barry John was honoured with the Padma Shri, India's fourth-highest civilian award, by the Government of India.

== Biography ==
=== Early life and education ===
John was born in 1944 in Coventry, Warwickshire (now in the West Midlands), England. His father was an engineer who served in the Royal Navy during the Second World War; his mother was a homemaker. He had a younger sister, Christine.

By the age of 12, he had started selling newspapers and pursued theatre in the evenings. At 15, his father fixed up a job for him at the factory where he worked. After finishing school, he moved to London, but unable to find a place in acting schools, he joined Bretton Hall College (Leeds University) in 1967, where he trained to become a theatre teacher.. He subsequently taught for a year before leaving for India in 1968.

Based in India since the 1970s, John became an Indian citizen in 2012.

=== Career ===
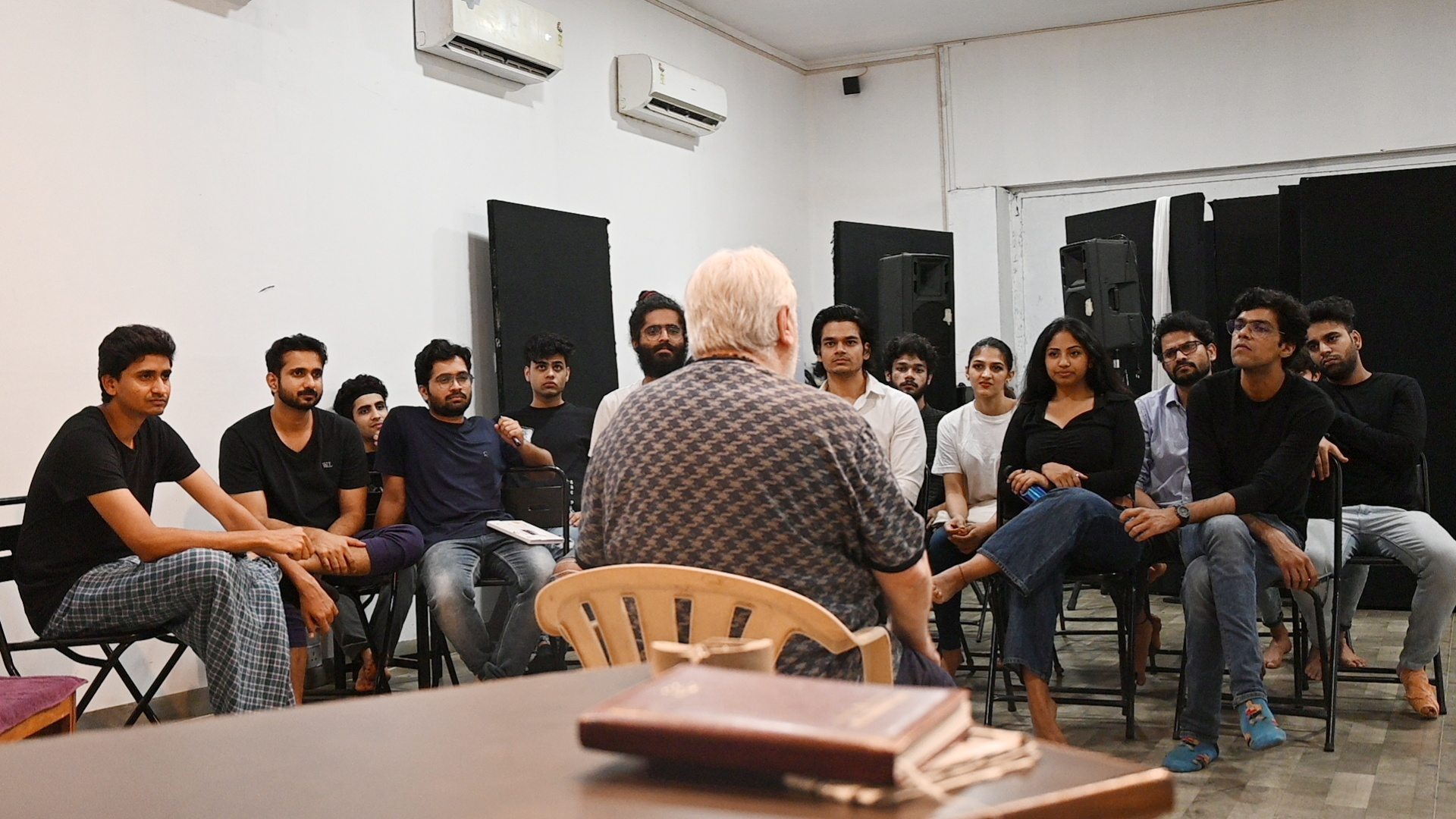
John with his theater group students

Deeply influenced by India and its culture, during the hippie era, he even delved into the Upanishads. Then in 1968, Pandit Ravi Shankar staged a concert at the Coventry Cathedral; a few days later, he saw an ad in the newspapers for a teaching job in India, to which he applied. Thus aged 22 he landed in Bangalore, where he stayed for the next two years, teaching English during the day at Regional Institute of English on Cunningham Road, and doing radio programmes. Evenings were for amateur theatre, with Bangalore Amateur Dramatics Society and the Bangalore Little Theatre. After arriving in Delhi in 1970, he joined the 'Yatrik' theatre group, staying at the YMCA hostel and working as a freelance teacher in schools and colleges.

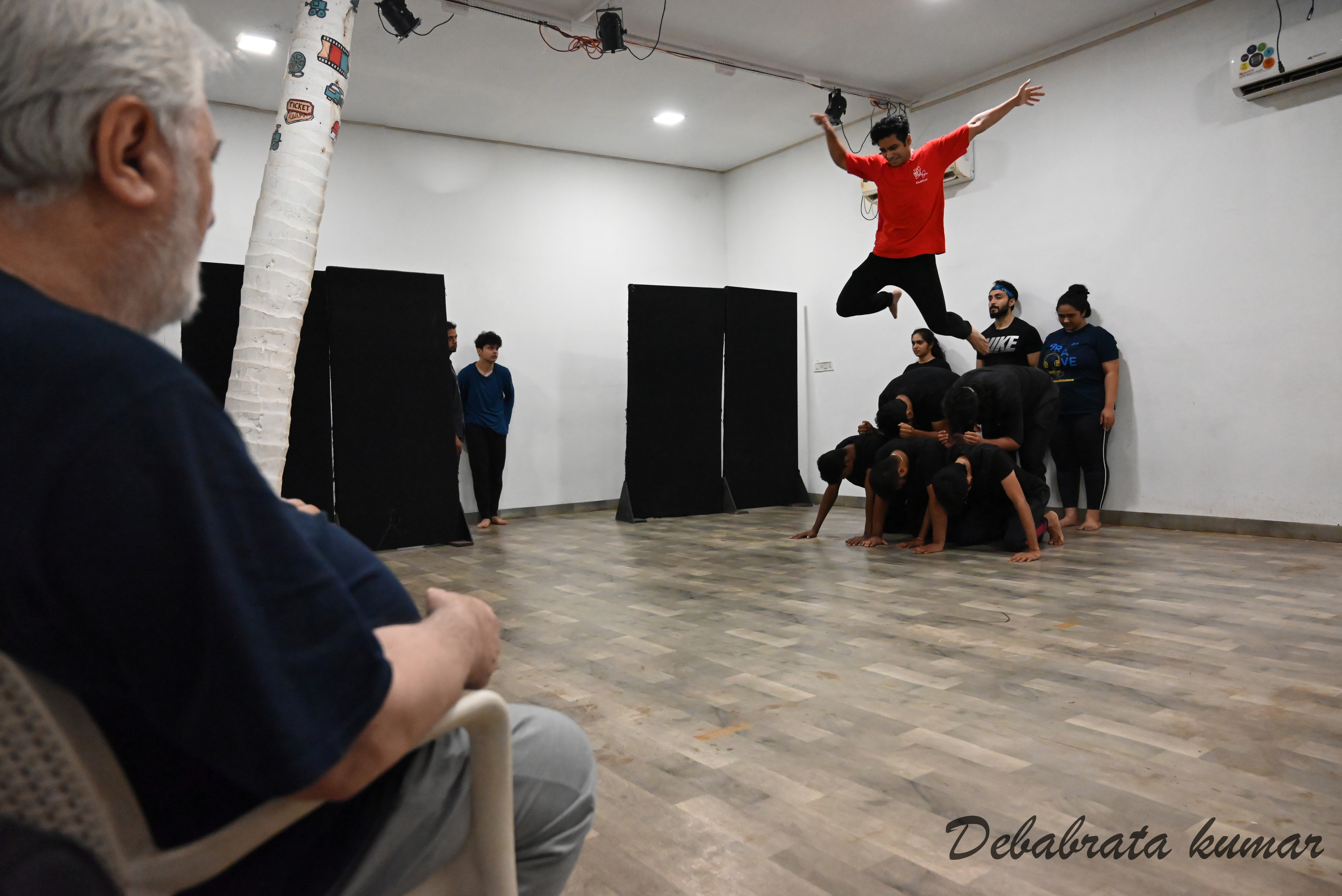
Barry John with The Free Birds Collective students

In 1973, he founded the Theatre Action Group (TAG), with Siddharth Basu, Roshan Seth, Lilette Dubey, Mira Nair, Manohar Singh, Pamela Rooks, Surekha Sikri, and Pankaj Kapoor, among others. The group performed various forms of drama until 1977, when John joined the faculty of the National School of Drama, Delhi (1977–80), and later became the Founder-Director of the NSD's Theatre in Education Company (TIE)(1989). He has been conducting theatre workshops ever since and, in 1997, opened the 'Imago Acting School' in Delhi.

He also appeared in a few films, like Satyajit Ray's Shatranj Ke Khilari (The Chess Players) (1977), Richard Attenborough's Gandhi (1982), Massey Sahib (1985). He also acted in several of his own productions, as well as those of other directors, including Roysten Abel's Othello a Play in Black and White. In 2010, he appeared in Tere Bin Laden in the role of a United States security general.

In 2007, he moved to Mumbai, where his acting school was opened as 'Barry John Acting Studio', in the same year, he also wrote a book "Playing for Real", published by Macmillan, a chronicle of 178 drama exercises for children, and co-authored by Rajan Chawla and Cathy Yogin, students of his Imago Theatre in Education Company.

== Filmography ==
Year	Title	Role	Notes
1977	Chess Players		
1982	Gandhi	Police Superintendent	
1986	Massey Sahib	Charles Adam	
1992	Miss Beatty's Children	John Westcott	
2000	Shaheed Udham Singh	Michael Atlee	
2003	In Othello	Barry / Iago	
2007	The Great Indian Butterfly		
2009	Thanks Maa	Priest	
2010	Teen Patti		
2010	Tere Bin Laden	Ted Wood	
2012	Chittagong	Wilkinson	
2014	M Cream	Vishnu Das	

== Awards ==
- 1990: Sahitya Kala Parishad Award
- 1993: Sangeet Natak Akademi Award: Theatre Direction
- 2005: Padma Shri
- 2020: Lifetime Achievement Award, "Mahindra Excellence in Theatre Awards"
