= Massey Sahib =

1985 film by Pradip Krishen

- Directed by: Pradip Krishen
- Written by: Pradip Krishen
- Based on: Mister Johnson by Joyce Cary
- Produced by: NFDC
- Starring: Raghubir Yadav; Barry John; Arundhati Roy; Virendra Saxena
- Cinematography: R. K. Bose
- Music by: Vanraj Bhatia
- Release date: 1985
- Running time: 124 minutes
- Country: India
- Language: Hindi

Massey Sahib is a 1985 Hindi drama film directed by Pradip Krishen, starring Raghubir Yadav in the title role. It was Krishen's first film, and was an adaptation of Joyce Cary's 1939 novel Mister Johnson. It won Yadav two international acting awards. The film also stars Arundhati Roy, who was yet to write her first novel and win the Man Booker Prize, along with Barry John and Virendra Saxena.

== Synopsis ==
The film is set in 1929, in a small town in Central India. Francis Massey (Raghubir Yadav) is a clerk in the District Collector's office in the colonial administration of British India. He aspires to be like the colonial rulers and thinks of himself as different from his Indian compatriots. He falls in love with a tribal girl Saila (Arundhati Roy), and browbeats her family into agreeing to their marriage. They have a church wedding, with Saila's brother Pasa (Virendra Saxena) as the bemused witness. In his wish to help the rulers – in particular, his immediate superior, District Collector Charles Adam (Barry John) – Massey adopts methods that are irregular. Adam's dream project of building a road through the forest is stuck for lack of funds. Massey manages to get it completed using a mixture of manipulation, persuasion and threats. To his surprise, he is accused of corruption by the very boss whom he had meant to help, and who had condoned his earlier transgressions. His wife, too, is forcefully taken back by her family. He turns for help to his friend Banaji (Madan Lal) to get his wife back. Banaji refuses to help him. In an act of frustrated rage, Massey kills Banaji. He is arrested for murder, and Adam advises him to plead guilty to accidental manslaughter. However, Massey refuses, secure in the belief that his Adam Sahib will help him out, leading to the tragic denouement.

== Cast ==
- Raghubir Yadav – Francis Massey
- Barry John – Charles Adam
- Arundhati Roy - Saila
- Madan Lal – Banaji
- Jacqueline Garewal – Ruby Adam
- Virendra Saxena – Pasa

== Production ==
=== Finance ===
In 1980, Pradip Krishen won the first prize in a script-writing competition organised by the National Film Development Corporation (NFDC). This encouraged him to make the film, which would be produced by NFDC. The budget for the film, which was approved by NFDC was Rs 9.2 lakh, which was meagre for a period film. Nevertheless, Krishen went ahead with the project.

=== Casting ===
Originally, Siddhartha Basu was supposed to play the lead, and a sample scene was shot with him. Then Basu went abroad and Krishen chose Raghubir Yadav, at that time an unknown young theatre actor. NFDC urged Krishen to get "known names" for the cast, but Krishen stuck to his choices, using theatre actors from Delhi, as well as debutante Arundhati Roy. The choice of Yadav for the lead turned out to be doubly beneficial. Not only would Yadav's performance win him accolades, but his knowledge of Hindi and its dialects came in handy in evolving the dialogue for the film.

=== Shooting ===
The film was shot on location in and around Pachmarhi in Madhya Pradesh, during the winter of 1982–83. In an interview, Raghubir Yadav said that he was very nervous about facing the camera for the first time, but was reassured by Barry John, with whom he had worked on the stage. He added, "Till we reached Pachmarhi for the shoot, I was not clear how I would play this complex character. One week before the shooting I saw an old man on the road in an outfit similar to what Massey was expected to wear. He seemed to belong to that era. I followed his mannerisms."

== Reception ==
Although the film met with no commercial success, it did receive widespread critical acclaim. Apart from the two international awards won by Yadav, Krishen was honoured by the Indian Directors' Association with the Best Director Award. Subsequently, the film has achieved a kind of cult status. Looking back on it, one critic wrote:"Raghuvir Yadav set the screen afire with his persuasively intense performance as a clerk who is ambitious but not clever enough to manoeuvre exotic rules and regulations that land him into trouble."

Among younger filmmakers, Dibakar Banerjee says he has been strongly influenced by the film.

== Awards ==
- Silver Peacock for Best Actor – Raghubir Yadav, 11th International Film Festival of India, 1987
- Indian Directors' Association Award for Best Director, 1987
- FIPRESCI Critic's Prize for Best Actor – Raghubir Yadav, Venice Film Festival, 1986
