= National Film Award for Best English Feature Film =

Indian film award

- National award for contributions to Indian Cinema
- Sponsored by: National Film Development Corporation of India
- Formerly called: President's Silver Medal for Best Feature Film in English (1964)
- Rewards: Rajat Kamal (Silver Lotus); ₹2,00,000
- First award: 1964
- Most recent winner: The Coffin Maker (2013)

The National Film Award for Best English Feature Film is one of the National Film Awards of India presented annually by the Directorate of Film Festivals, the organisation set up by Ministry of Information and Broadcasting. It is one of several awards presented for feature films and awarded with Rajat Kamal (Silver Lotus).

The National Film Awards, established in 1954, are the most prominent film awards in India that merit the best of the Indian cinema. The ceremony also presents awards for films in various regional languages.

Awards for films in seven regional language (Bengali, Hindi, Kannada, Malayalam, Marathi, Tamil and Telugu) started from 2nd National Film Awards which were presented on 21 December 1955. Three awards of "President's Silver Medal for Best Feature Film", "Certificate of Merit for the Second Best Feature Film" and "Certificate of Merit for the Third Best Feature Film" were instituted. The later two certificate awards were discontinued from 15th National Film Awards (1967).

Produced and directed by Serbjeet Singh, the 1964 film The Avalanche was honoured with the first president's silver medal for Best Feature Film in English. After 1964, awards were discontinued for certain period and resumed for feature films produced in 1981 at 29th National Film Awards.

== Winners ==
Award includes 'Rajat Kamal' (Silver Lotus) and cash prize. Following are the award winners over the years:

List of award films, showing the year (award ceremony), producer(s) and director(s)
Year	Film(s)	Producer(s)	Director(s)	Refs.
1964 (12th)	The Avalanche	Serbjeet Singh	Serbjeet Singh	
1981 (29th)	36 Chowringhee Lane	Shashi Kapoor	Aparna Sen	
1982 (30th)	No Award			
1983 (31st)	No Award			
1984 (32nd)	No Award			
1985 (33rd)	No Award			
1986 (34th)	Watchman	T. S. Narasimhan	Shankar Nag	
1987 (35th)	No Award			
1988 (36th)	In Which Annie Gives It Those Ones	Pradip Krishen	Pradip Krishen	
1989 (37th)	No Award			
1990 (38th)	No Award			
1991 (39th)	No Award			
1992 (40th)	Electric Moon	Bobby Bedi	Pradip Krishen	
1993 (41st)	No Award			
1994 (42nd)	English, August	Anuradha Parikh	Dev Benegal	
1995 (43rd)	The Making of the Mahatma	NFDC	Shyam Benegal	
1996 (44th)	No Award			
1997 (45th)	No Award			
1998 (46th)	Dr. Babasaheb Ambedkar	• Government of India • Government of Maharashtra • NFDC	Jabbar Patel	
1999 (47th)	No Award			
2000 (48th)	Pandavas: The Five Warriors	Pentamedia Graphics Ltd	Pentamedia Graphics Ltd	
2001 (49th)	Mitr, My Friend	Suresh Menon	Revathi	
2002 (50th)	Stumble	2 Streams Media	Prakash Belawadi	
2003 (51st)	Dance Like a Man	NFDC	Pamela Rooks	
2004 (52nd)	Amu	Shonali Bose	Shonali Bose	
2005 (53rd)	15 Park Avenue	Bipin Kumar Vohra	Aparna Sen	
2006 (54th)	Quest	Amol Palekar	Amol Palekar	
2007 (55th)	The Last Lear	Arindam Chaudhuri	Rituparno Ghosh	
2008 (56th)	Land Gold Women	Vivek Agrawal	Avantika Hari	
2009 (57th)	No Award			
2010 (58th)	Memories in March	Shrikant Mohta	Sanjoy Nag	
2011 (59th)	No Award			
2012 (60th)	Lessons in Forgetting	Prince Thampi	Unni Vijayan	
2013 (61st)	The Coffin Maker	Shree Narayan Studio	Veena Bakshi	
2014 (62nd)	No Award			
2015 (63rd)	No Award			
2016 (64th)	No Award			
2017 (65th)	No Award			
2018 (66th)	No Award			
2019 (67th)	No Award			
2020 (68th)	No Award			
2021 (69th)	No Award			
2022 (70th)	No Award			
