= American Daylight =

- Original theatrical poster
- Directed by: Roger Christian
- Written by: Farrukh Dhondy
- Starring: Nick Moran; Koel Purie
- Cinematography: Hinman Dhamija
- Edited by: Alan Strachan
- Music by: Amaan Ali Bangash; Ayaan Ali Bangash
- Distributed by: Kaleidoscope Entertainment
- Release dates: 11 July 2004 (USA); 17 December 2004 (India)
- Running time: 98 minutes
- Country: India
- Language: English

American Daylight is a 2004 Indo-American co-production film directed by Roger Christian and produced by Kaleidoscope Entertainment. The film stars Nick Moran as Lawrence, an American music executive, who falls for Sujata (Koel Purie), a call center worker in India, then flies halfway around the planet to meet her. Nick's journey is complicated by his wife (Jennifer Siebel), Sujata's boss (Vijay Raaz) who sees Lawrence as a romantic rival, and the assassin hired by that boss to kill Lawrence.

After October 2004 screenings at the London Film Festival and Pusan International Film Festival, the film opened wide in India on 17 December 2004. The film was premiered in the Marché du Film section of the 2005 Cannes Film Festival.

== Cast ==
- Nick Moran as Lawrence
- Koel Purie as Sujata a.k.a. Sue
- Jennifer Siebel as Zelda
- Vijay Raaz as Pratap
- Gulshan Grover as Billoo
- Amardeep Jha as Sue's mother

== Sources ==
- Elley, Derek (1 November 2004). "Film Reviews: American Daylight". Variety.
- Bhushan, Nyay (30 December 2003). "Night and 'Daylight': East meets West in film about call centers". The Hollywood Reporter. Archived from the original on 11 October 2012 – via HighBeam Research.
- "American Daylight premiered in Europe". India News Portal. Sify. 28 October 2004. Archived from the original on 19 October 2012.
- Kit, Borys (13 November 2003). "Nick Moran is starring in "American Daylight" for director Roger Christian and Kaleidoscope Entertainment". The Hollywood Reporter. Archived from the original on 11 October 2012 – via HighBeam Research.
- "Bangash brothers compose for American Daylight". India News Portal. Sify. 2 February 2005. Archived from the original on 18 February 2011.
