= Electric Moon =

- Directed by: Pradip Krishen
- Screenplay by: Arundhati Roy
- Produced by: Bobby Bedi (Kaleidoscope Entertainment)
- Starring: Roshan Seth; Alice Spivak; Tigmanshu Dhulia
- Cinematography: Giles Nuttgens
- Edited by: Pradip Krishen
- Music by: Simeon Venkov
- Release date: 4 December 1992 (UK)
- Running time: 103 minutes
- Countries: United Kingdom; India
- Language: English

Electric Moon is a 1992 Indian film directed by Pradip Krishen and written by Arundhati Roy. The film was produced by Grapevine Media for Channel 4 Television and Bobby Bedi's Kaleidoscope Entertainment and was reviewed at the International Film Festival of India (IFFI) and the 36th London Film Festival (1992).

At the 40th National Film Awards, the film won the award for Best Feature Film in English.

Set in an expensive tourist lodge in the forests of central India run by former royalty, Raja Ran Bikram Singh, 'Bubbles', the film is a satirical parody on Westerners visiting India, in search for their stereotypical notions of the country, replete with images of former Indian royalty, and relics of the British Raj. In turn the film was a commentary on social pretense and ecology. The issue was previously taken up by the Merchant-Ivory film The Guru (1969), and in time the film acquired a cult following.

In a 2005 interview, Roy said, "The movie I had in my head and different from the one we shot. I wanted it to have a more anarchic quality, but I didn't know enough about cinema to make that come through on screen."

== Cast ==
- Roshan Seth - Ranveer
- Naseeruddin Shah - Rambuhj Goswami
- Leela Naidu - Sukanya 'Socks'
- Gerson Da Cunha - Raja Ran Bikram Singh, 'Bubbles'
- Raghuvir Yadav - Boltu
- Alice Spivak - Louise Robinson
- Frances Helm - Emma Lane
- James Fleet - Simon Lidell
- Gareth Forwood - Ian
- Malcolm Jamieson - Thierry
