= Listening to Grasshoppers =

2009 book by Arundhati Roy

- First edition
- Author: Arundhati Roy
- Publisher: Hamish Hamilton
- Publication date: 2009
- Publication place: India

Listening to Grasshoppers: Field Notes on Democracy (2009) is a collection of essays written by Booker Prize winner Arundhati Roy. Written between 2002 and 2008, the essays have been published in various left-leaning newspapers and magazines in India. The first edition of the book consists of eleven essays with an introduction by Roy was published by Hamish Hamilton in India.

== Reviews ==
Financial Times remarked about Roy over the book, "There is little doubt that Roy, with her eloquence, concern for the poor, and personal magnetism, is an important voice in the Indian public sphere. But the danger is that her extreme views – and her fierce hostility to a liberalisation programme that many Indians credit with dramatic improvements in their own lives – will alienate those whose support will be essential in India's struggle for social justice in the years ahead."

Nirmalya Dutta harshly criticised her at Freepress Journal and wrote, "Roy should've stuck to writing fiction instead of creating fiction in news. That febrile imagination would’ve been better served creating genocidal maniacs in a Rowling-type literary tour de force than imagining genocides in the real world."

Hindustan Times also reviewed the book, "The collection is thought-provoking, well-researched and worth reading. But in retrospect, the thin line between reportage, editorial writing, sermonising and the fine art of non-fiction essay writing seems to overlap too frequently in the anthology."
