= The Ministry of Utmost Happiness =

2017 novel by Arundhati Roy

- first edition
- Author: Arundhati Roy
- Cover artist: Mayank Austen Soofi
- Language: English
- Genre: Fiction
- Set in: India
- Publisher: Hamish Hamilton (UK & India); Alfred A. Knopf (US)
- Publication date: 6 June 2017
- Publication place: India
- Pages: 449
- ISBN: 9781524733155
- Preceded by: The God Of Small Things

The Ministry of Utmost Happiness is the second novel by Indian writer Arundhati Roy, published in 2017, twenty years after her debut, The God of Small Things.

== Plot ==
The novel weaves together the stories of people navigating some of the darkest and most violent episodes of modern Indian history, from land reform that dispossessed poor farmers to the Bhopal disaster, 2002 Godhra train burning and Kashmir insurgency. Roy's characters run the gamut of Indian society and include an intersex woman (hijra), a rebellious architect, and her landlord who is a supervisor in the intelligence service. The narrative spans across decades and locations, but primarily takes place in Delhi and Kashmir.

== Characters ==
- Anjum is born intersex and lives as a Muslim hijra who lives in the Khwabgah for many years before leaving and eventually founding the Jannat Guest House. On her visit to a Gujarati shrine, Anjum gets caught in a massacre of Hindu pilgrims and subsequent government reprisals against Muslims. She is anxious about the future of her own community, especially the new generation. She was born as Aftab, the long-awaited son of Jahanara Begum and Mulaqat Ali.
- Mulaqat Ali is the husband of Jahanara Begum and the father of Aftab. He is a hakim, a doctor of herbal medicine, and a lover of poetry. Ali is the direct descendant of Mongol Emperor Changez Khan – through the emperor's second-born son, Chagatai.
- Zainab is a three-year-old girl whom Anjum picks up on the steps of the Jama Masjid. Zainab is brought up at Khwabgah and later goes on to become a fashion designer who marries Saddam.
- Saddam Hussain (Dayachand) is one of the guests at the Jannat Guest House. He was originally named Dayachand but named himself after Saddam Hussain after seeing a video of his execution. Saddam works odd jobs – in a mortuary, as a helper in a shop, a bus conductor, selling newspapers at the New Delhi railway station, as a bricklayer on a construction site and as a security guard. Saddam wants to avenge his father's death by killing Sehrawat, the Station House Officer of the Dulina police station.
- Dr. Azad Bharatiya is one of the many protestors near Jantar Mantar. He continues his 10-year fast and runs a newsletter called "News & Views".
- S. Tilottama is a student at the Architecture School who is estranged from her Syrian Christian mother, Mariyam Ipe. Tilo becomes friends with three men – Musa Yewsi, Nagaraj Hariharan and Biplab Dasgupta, whom she meets while working on sets and lighting design for the play Norman, Is That You? directed by David Quartermaine.
- Nagaraj Hariharan is cast as Norman in the play. He later becomes a top-notch journalist who works in Kashmir. Tilo marries Naga as suggested by Musa for strategic reasons and later abandons him.
- Biplab Dasgupta was to play the role of Garson Hobart in Norman, Is That You?. He later works for the Intelligence Bureau as Deputy Station Head. Biplab secretly loves Tilo and rents her a room after she walks out on Naga.
- Musa Yeswi (Commander Gulrez) is a reticent Kashmiri man who is classmates with Tilo in Architecture School and later her boyfriend. Musa later returns to his homeland to become a militant and fight for Azadi. Musa marries Arifa and fathers Miss Jebeen the First.
- Begum Arifa Yeswi is the wife of Musa Yeswi. Musa meets Arifa in a stationery shop where a grenade explosion takes place.
- Major Amrik Singh is a military officer in charge of counter-insurgency operations in Kashmir. He murders Jalib Qadri, a well-known lawyer and human rights activist and subsequently seeks asylum in the US claiming to be the victim of the tortures he has inflicted on others.
- Comrade Revathy is a Maoist from East Godavari district of Andhra Pradesh who is raped and tortured by policeman. She's the mother of Udaya (Miss Jebeen the Second). Revathy leaves Udaya in Jantar Mantar.

=== Other characters ===
- Jahanara Begum – Mother of Aftab (Anjum). Dotes on him and takes him to the dargah of Hazrat Sarmad Shaheed. Even after Aftab moves to Khwabgah, she continues to send a hot meal every day.
- Ahlam Baji – The midwife who delivers Aftab and who, during her last days, grows disoriented. She's buried in Jahanara Begum's family graveyard.
- Ustad Hameed Khan – Musician who taught Aftab Hindustani classical music. Aftab eventually stops going to the music classes due to snickering and teasing from other children.
- Imam Ziauddin – The blind imam who accompanies Anjum in the graveyard and once led the prayers at Fatehpuri Masjid
- Kulsoom Bi –Ustad, guru of Khwabgah
- Saeeda–The new face of Khwabgah after Anjum and is soon to take over as the ustad
- Zakir Mian – Proprietor and Managing Director of A-1 Flower. He travels with Anjum.
- Begum Zeenat Kauser – Anjum's aunt and Mulaqat Ali's older sister.
- Begum Renata Mumtaj – Belly dancer from Romania who grew up in Bucharest dreaming of India and its classical dancing forms. She's buried in Jannat after her death.
- Roshan Lal – Headwaiter of Rosebud Rest-O-Bar
- Mr. D. D. Gupta – An old client of Anjum who is a building contractor. He moves to Baghdad to capitalize on the escalating demand for concrete blast walls.
- Loveleen Singh – Wife of Amrik Singh. She's a victim of domestic violence.
- ACP Pinky Sodhi – Assistant Commandant and brutal interrogator who worked with Amrik Singh.
- Balbir Singh Sodhi – ACP Pinky Sodhi's brother. A senior police officer who had been shot down by militants in Sopore.

== Awards and honours ==
- 2017 The Hindu Literary Prize shortlist
- 2017 Man Booker Prize longlist
- 2018 National Book Critics Circle Award finalist

== See also ==
- "Full Extended Interview: Arundhati Roy on Democracy Now!".
- Re:Reader | The Ministry of Utmost Happiness
