= The Doctor and the Saint =

2019 book by Arundhati Roy

- First edition
- Author: Arundhati Roy
- Language: English
- Genre: History; Indian Literature
- Publisher: Haymarket Books
- Publication date: 2017
- Publication place: India
- Pages: 128

The Doctor and the Saint: The Ambedkar-Gandhi Debate: Caste, Race and Annihilation of Caste is a book written by Indian author Arundhati Roy. It was published in 2017 by Haymarket Books. The title of the book refers to B. R. Ambedkar as 'the Doctor' and M. K. Gandhi as 'the Saint'.

== Reception ==
In The New Indian Express, reviewer Madhulika Liddle wrote: "As Roy explains in the preface to this book, The Doctor and the Saint looks at the practice of caste in India, through the prism of the present as well as the past.”

According to the Firstpost review: "The Doctor and the Saint is strongest when it sets about its primary task: to scrutinise the historiography of Mohandas Karamchand Gandhi, and to remind readers of some inconvenient truths about the man, facts that make the Mahatma’s mythologists very uncomfortable indeed."
