= Pallikoodam (school) =

- Kottayam, Kerala; India

Information
- Type: Private
- Established: 1967; 59 years ago
- Authority: Council for the Indian School Certificate Examinations
- Principal: Mariamma Paul
- Campus: Kalathilpady, Kottayam
- Website: www.pallikoodam.org

Pallikoodam (formerly known as Corpus Christi High School) is a high school in the Kalathilpady area of Kottayam in Kerala, India. It was established in 1967 by educator and women's rights activist, Mary Roy. The term "Pallikoodam" means school in the Malayalam and Tamil languages.

== The campus ==
The campus of the school was designed by architect Laurie Baker and includes a swimming pool, basketball and volleyball courts, a football field, an 800-seat auditorium, and platforms for theatre and other performing arts. The school has a full-time faculty for sports, drama, music, dance and other arts.

== Activities ==
The school has partnered with activist organisations including Greenpeace, EXNORA, and several NGOs in Kerala for projects. Victim relief efforts have been organised by the school in the wake of disasters such as the Orissa cyclones and the 2005 tsunami. The school was a subject of a documentary by the Indian broadcaster Doordarshan: Mary Roy and Corpus Christi. Projects of the school have been featured on BBC World and Star News.

== Environmental and social role ==
Pallikoodam School has championed several socio-environmental causes in Kottayam. It protested against the official apathy regarding the Vadavathoor Dump problem and formed the Citizen's Action Forum (CAF) which discusses such issues.

There was a lack of water at the Institute of Child Health in Kottayam; it was found that there was adequate water supply to the I.C.H., but the Class IV employees had diverted it into their own quarters where it was being used to irrigate crops. Due to the sustained agitation by the CAF, the water supply was restored.

The Ministry of Environment and Forests (MoEF) has formulated the Municipal Wastes Management and Handling Rules, 2000. Bala Bhu Bhadratha, an environmental organisation started in Pallikoodam, has filed a Writ of Mandamus in the High Court of Kerala, praying that these rules be implemented in Kottayam.Pallikoodam has also fought against the pollution in the Meenchil River and the use of endosulfan in India. The school has distributed hundreds of waste compost units, teaching people to segregate waste, and the students of Pallikoodam have often cleaned up the nearby Kalathipady road, Karipal Hospital area.

== Emphasizes on mother tongue ==
The school teaches English after 3rd standard. It helps students to think and speak in their mother tongue Malayalam at an early age which helps them love their own language.

== Noted alumni ==
- Arundhati Roy (Booker Prize winner, 1997)
- Justice Bechu Kurian Thomas
- Gokul Suresh (Indian actor)
- Bobby-Sanjay (Indian scriptwriters)
- Farhaan Faasil (Indian actor)
- James Luke ( Small Scale Industrialist, Hotelier and Stunt Double)
