= Arundhati Roy =

Indian author and activist (born 1961)

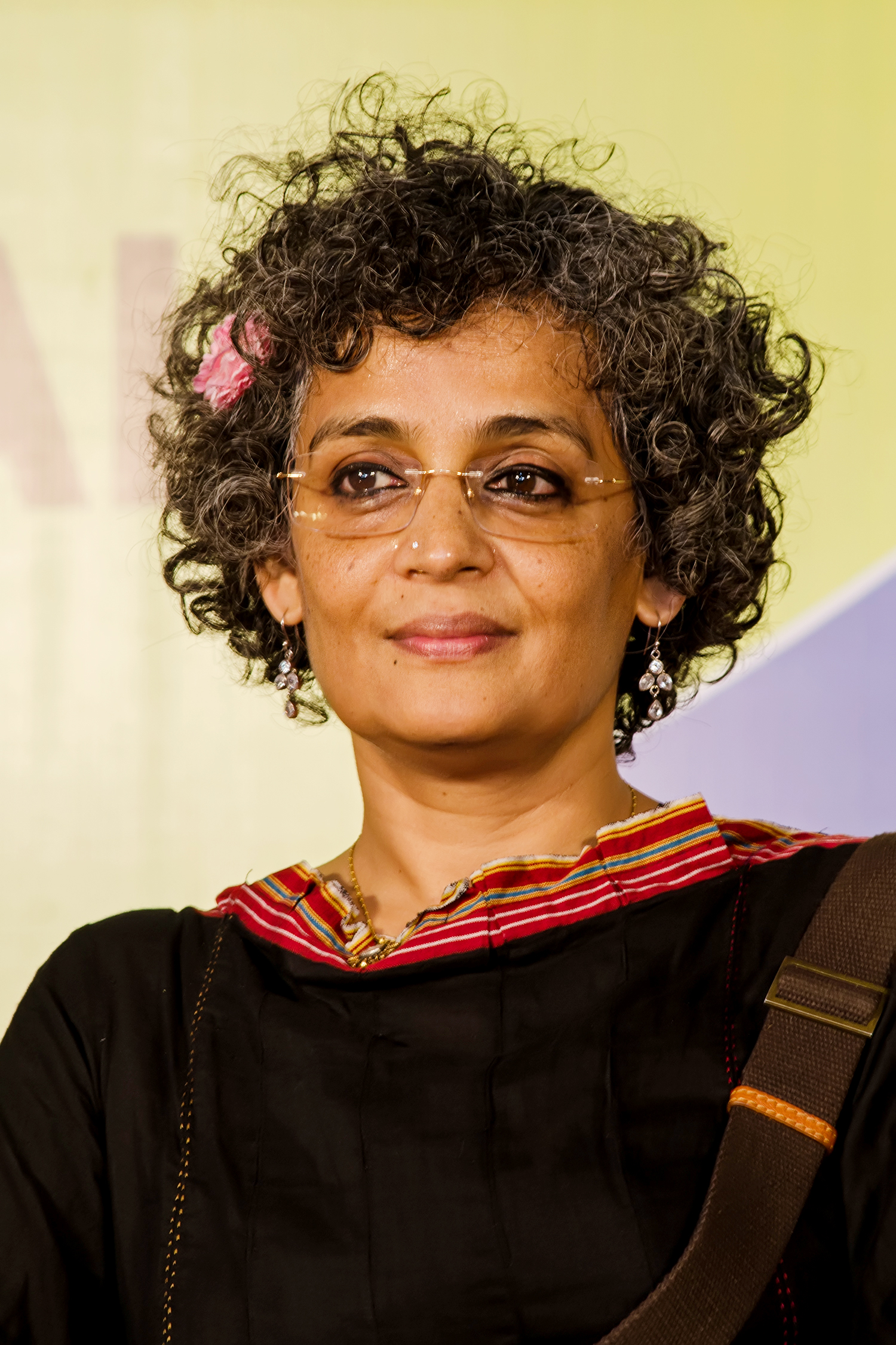
- Roy in 2013
- Born: Suzanna Arundhati Roy; 24 November 1961 (age 64); Shillong, Assam, India
- Education: Lawrence School; SPA Delhi
- Occupations: Writer, essayist, activist
- Spouse: Pradip Krishen (m. 1984; div. 2022)
- Partner: Gerard da Cunha (1978–1982)
- Parent: Mary Roy (mother)
- Relatives: Prannoy Roy (cousin); Maria Roy (niece)
- Writing career
- Period: 1997–present
- Genres: Fiction, non-fiction
- Notable work: The God of Small Things
- Notable awards: National Film Award for Best Screenplay (1988); Booker Prize (1997); Sydney Peace Prize (2004); Orwell Award (2004); Norman Mailer Prize (2011); PEN Pinter Prize (2024)
- Arundhati Roy's voice Roy on the BBC programme Bookclub, 2 October 2011.

Suzanna Arundhati Roy (Bengali pronunciation: [orundʱoti rae̯]; born 24 November 1961) is an Indian author best known for her novel The God of Small Things (1997), which won the Booker Prize for Fiction in 1997 and became the biggest-selling book by a non-expatriate Indian author. She is also a political activist involved in human rights and environmental causes. She was the winner of the 2024 PEN Pinter Prize, given by English PEN, and she named imprisoned British-Egyptian writer and activist Alaa Abd El-Fattah as the "Writer of Courage" with whom she chose to share the award.

== Early life ==
Roy was born in Shillong, in Undivided Assam (now in Meghalaya). Her mother, Mary Roy, was a Malayali Christian women's rights activist from Aymanam, Kerala, and belonged to the Jacobite Syrian denomination. Her father, Rajib Roy, was a Bengali Hindu who later embraced Christianity. He was a tea plantation manager from Kolkata, West Bengal.

Roy's father was an alcoholic. When she was two years old, her parents divorced, and she returned to Kerala with her mother and brother. For some time, the family lived with Roy's maternal grandfather in Ooty, Tamil Nadu. When she was five, the family moved back to Kerala, where her mother started a school. She attended school at Corpus Christi in Kottayam, Kerala, followed by the Lawrence School in Lovedale, Tamil Nadu.

Roy then studied architecture at the School of Planning and Architecture in New Delhi, where she met architect Gerard da Cunha. They moved in together in 1978 and lived in Delhi, pretending to be married, and then in Goa, before separating in 1982. Roy then returned to Delhi, where she obtained a position with the National Institute of Urban Affairs.

== Career ==
=== Early career: screenplays ===
Early in her career, Roy worked in television and movies. She starred in Massey Sahib in 1985. She wrote the screenplays for In Which Annie Gives It Those Ones (1989), a movie based on her experiences as a student of architecture, in which she also appeared as a performer, and Electric Moon (1992). Both were directed by her husband, Pradip Krishen, during their marriage. Roy won the National Film Award for Best Screenplay in 1988 for In Which Annie Gives It Those Ones. She attracted attention in 1994 when she criticised Shekhar Kapur's film Bandit Queen, which was based on the life of Phoolan Devi. In her film review titled "The Great Indian Rape Trick", Roy questioned the right to "restage the rape of a living woman without her permission", and charged Kapur with exploiting Devi and misrepresenting both her life and its meaning.

=== The God of Small Things ===
Roy began writing her first novel, The God of Small Things, in 1992, completing it in 1996. The book is semi-autobiographical and a major part captures her childhood experiences in Aymanam.

The publication of The God of Small Things catapulted Roy to international fame. It received the 1997 Booker Prize for Fiction and was listed as one of The New York Times Notable Books of the Year. It reached the fourth position on The New York Times Bestseller list for Independent Fiction. From the beginning, the book was also a commercial success: Roy received a publishing advance of half a million pounds. It was published in May, and the book had been sold in 18 countries by the end of June.

The God of Small Things received very favourable reviews in major American newspapers, including The New York Times (a "dazzling first novel", "extraordinary", "at once so morally strenuous and so imaginatively supple") and the Los Angeles Times ("a novel of poignancy and considerable sweep"), and in Canadian publications such as the Toronto Star ("a lush, magical novel"). It was one of the five best books of 1997 according to Time. Critical response in the United Kingdom was less favourable, and the awarding of the Booker Prize caused controversy; Carmen Callil, a 1996 Booker Prize judge, called the novel "execrable" and a Guardian journalist called the content "profoundly depressing". In India, E. K. Nayanar, then the chief minister of Roy's home state of Kerala, especially criticised the book's unrestrained description of sexuality, and Roy had to answer charges of obscenity.

=== Later career ===
Since the success of her novel, Roy has written a television serial, The Banyan Tree, and the documentary DAM/AGE: A Film with Arundhati Roy (2002).

In 2006 Roy began working on a second novel, The Ministry of Utmost Happiness.

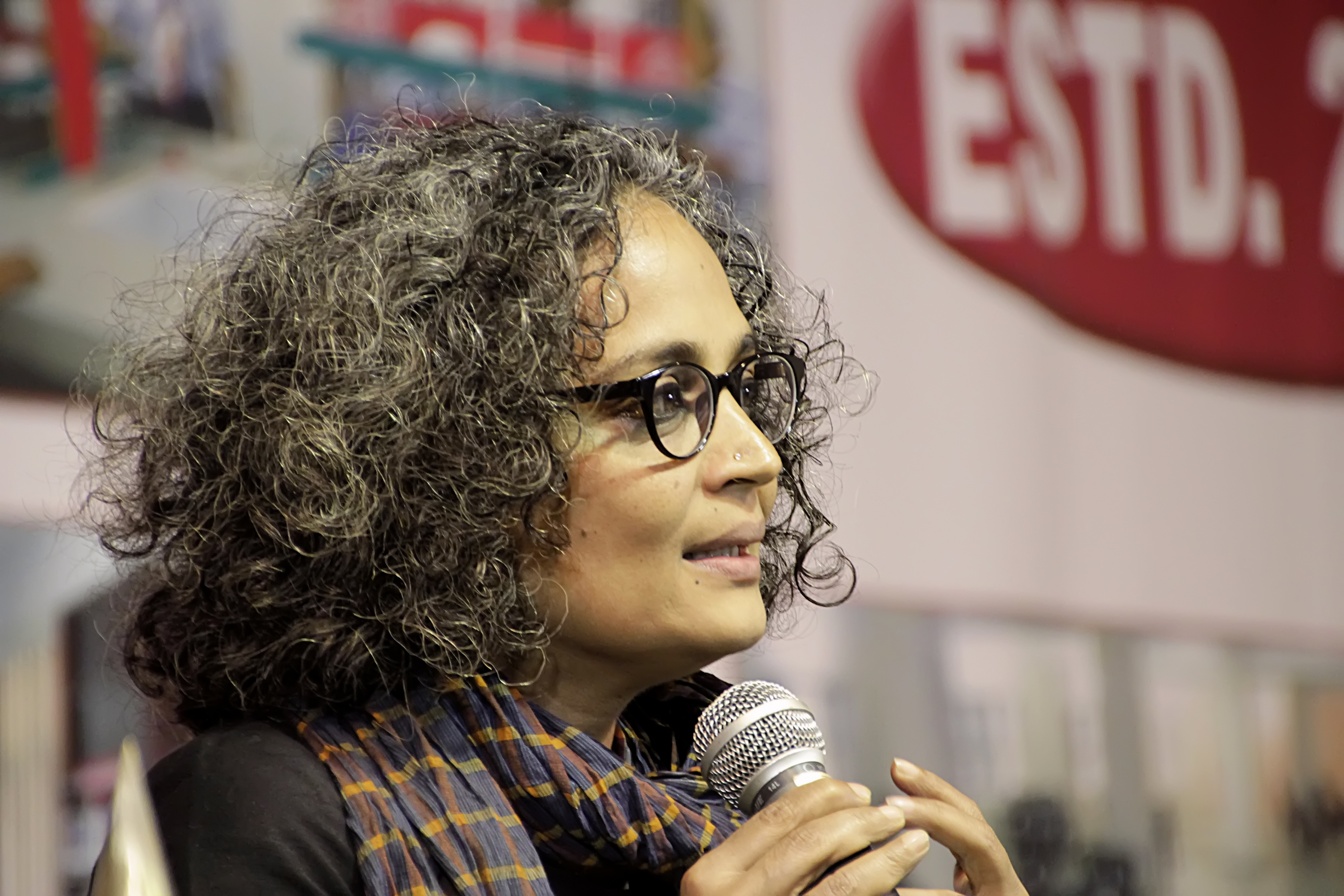
Roy, 1997 Man Booker Prize winner

Roy contributed to We Are One: A Celebration of Tribal Peoples, a book released in 2009 that explores the culture of peoples around the world, portraying their diversity and the threats to their existence. The royalties from the sale of this book go to the indigenous rights organisation Survival International.

Roy has written numerous essays on contemporary politics and culture. In 2014, they were collected by Penguin India in a five-volume set. In 2019, her nonfiction was collected in a single volume, My Seditious Heart, published by Haymarket Books.

In October 2016, Penguin India and Hamish Hamilton UK announced that they would publish her second novel, The Ministry of Utmost Happiness, in June 2017. The novel was chosen for the Man Booker Prize 2017 longlist, and was a finalist for the National Book Critics Circle Award for fiction in January 2018.

Roy's book Mother Mary Comes to Me was published in September 2025. A memoir, it focuses on her early years living with her mother, whom Roy calls "my shelter and my storm". It was broadcast in five parts on BBC Radio 4 as Book of the Week.

In 2026, Roy's restored 1989 film In Which Annie Gives It Those Ones was scheduled to screen at the 76th Berlin International Film Festival, and Roy was due to appear, but she withdrew after jury president Wim Wenders, said in response to a journalist's question that the jury "has to stay out of politics".

== Influences ==
Roy cites William Shakespeare, Rudyard Kipling, James Baldwin, Toni Morrison, Maya Angelou, John Berger, James Joyce, Vladimir Nabokov, and Gabriel Garcia Marquez as influences and has said, "I’m grateful for the lessons one learns from great writers, but also from imperialists, sexists, friends, lovers, oppressors, revolutionaries—everybody. Everybody has something to teach a writer".

== Advocacy ==
Since publishing The God of Small Things in 1997, Roy has spent most of her time on political activism and non-fiction (such as collections of essays about social causes). She is a spokesperson of the anti-globalization/alter-globalization movement and a vehement critic of neo-imperialism and US foreign policy. She opposes India's policies toward nuclear weapons as well as industrialisation and economic growth (which she describes as "encrypted with genocidal potential" in Listening to Grasshoppers: Field Notes on Democracy). She has also questioned the conduct of the Indian police and administration in the case of the 2001 Indian Parliament attack and the Batla House encounter case, contending that the country has had a "shadowy history of suspicious terror attacks, murky investigations, and fake encounters".

At the Wayanad Literature Festival, in conversation with Parvathi Thiruvothu, Roy said her protests and writing are not shows of bravery, but of wanting space to breathe and create. She said that only if people have space can they create art and make mistakes. "Open the windows", she said.

=== Support for Kashmiri independence ===
In an August 2008 interview with The Times of India, Roy expressed her support for the independence of Kashmir from India after the massive demonstrations in 2008 in favour of independence took place—some 500,000 people rallied in Srinagar in the Kashmir part of Jammu and Kashmir state of India for independence on 18 August 2008, following the Amarnath land transfer controversy. According to her, the rallies were a sign that Kashmiris desired secession from India, and not union with India. She was criticised by the Indian National Congress and Bharatiya Janata Party for her remarks.

All India Congress Committee member and senior Congress party leader Satya Prakash Malaviya asked Roy to withdraw her "irresponsible" statement, saying that it was "contrary to historical facts".

It would do better to brush up her knowledge of history and know that the princely state of Jammu and Kashmir had acceded to the Union of India after its erstwhile ruler Maharaja Hari Singh duly signed the Instrument of Accession on 26 October 1947. And the state, consequently has become as much an integral part of India as all the other erstwhile princely states have.

She was charged with sedition along with separatist Hurriyat leader Syed Ali Shah Geelani and others by Delhi Police for their "anti-India" speech at a 2010 convention on Kashmir: "Azadi: The Only Way". In June 2024, the UAPA Act was invoked against them.

Roy has been criticized for saying that India has "perpetually waged war" on its citizens in Kashmir, Manipur, Goa, among other regions. Former Indian Foreign Secretary Kanwal Sibal accused her of endorsing terrorism against India and said she "blatantly distorts the truth to support her deeply communal and anarchist agenda", calling her portrayal of India "venomous" and "deeply anti-Hindu".

=== Sardar Sarovar Project ===
Roy has campaigned along with activist Medha Patkar against the Narmada dam project, saying that the dam will displace half a million people with little or no compensation, and will not provide the projected irrigation, drinking water, and other benefits. Roy donated her Booker prize money, as well as royalties from her books on the project, to the Narmada Bachao Andolan. Roy also appears in Franny Armstrong's Drowned Out, a 2002 documentary about the project. Roy's opposition to the Narmada Dam project was criticised as "maligning Gujarat" by Congress and BJP leaders in Gujarat.

In 2002, Roy responded to a contempt notice issued against her by the Supreme Court of India with an affidavit saying that the court's decision to initiate contempt proceedings based on an unsubstantiated and flawed petition, while refusing to inquire into allegations of corruption in military contracting deals pleading an overload of cases, indicated a "disquieting inclination" to silence criticism and dissent using the power of contempt. The court found Roy's statement, which she refused to disavow or apologise for, constituted criminal contempt, sentenced her to a "symbolic" one day's imprisonment, and fined her ₹2500. Roy served the jail sentence and paid the fine rather than serve an additional three months for default.

Environmental historian Ramachandra Guha has been critical of Roy's Narmada dam activism. While acknowledging her "courage and commitment" to the cause, Guha writes that her advocacy is hyperbolic and self-indulgent, and that "Ms. Roy's tendency to exaggerate and simplify, her Manichaean view of the world, and her shrill hectoring tone, have given a bad name to environmental analysis". He faulted Roy's criticism of Supreme Court judges who were hearing a petition brought by the Narmada Bachao Andolan as careless and irresponsible.

Roy counters that her writing is intentional in its passionate, hysterical tone: "I am hysterical. I'm screaming from the bloody rooftops. And he and his smug little club are going 'Shhhh... you'll wake the neighbours!' I want to wake the neighbours, that's my whole point. I want everybody to open their eyes".

Gail Omvedt and Roy have fiercely debated Roy's strategy for the Narmada Dam movement. They disagree on whether to demand stopping the dam building altogether (Roy) or search for intermediate alternatives (Omvedt).

=== US foreign policy, war in Afghanistan ===
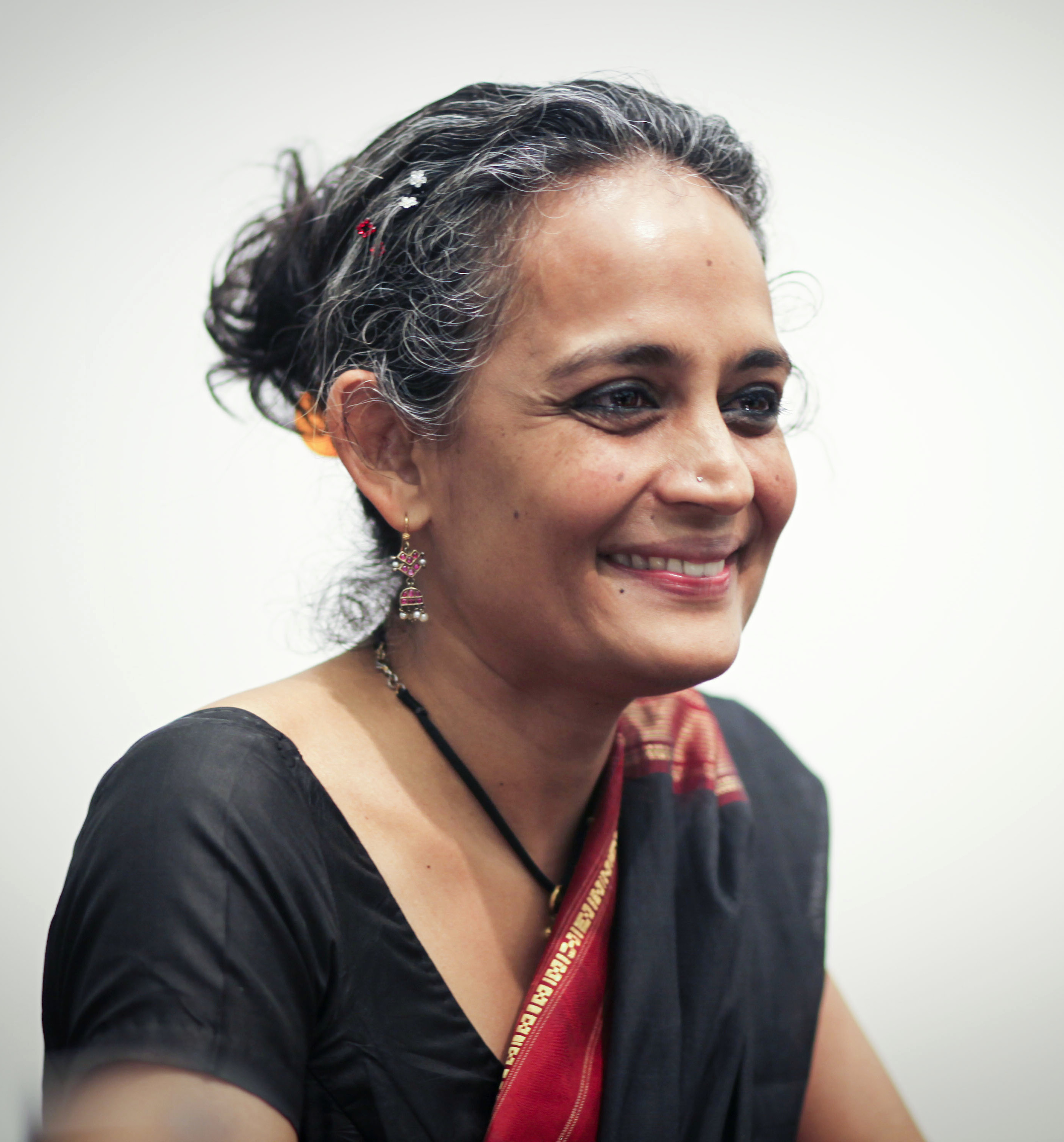
Roy delivering a talk "Can We Leave the Bauxite in the Mountain? Field Notes on Democracy" at Harvard Kennedy School, 1 April 2010

In a September 2001 opinion piece in The Guardian titled "The algebra of infinite justice", Roy responded to the US military invasion of Afghanistan, finding fault with the argument that this war would be a retaliation for the September 11 attacks: "The bombing of Afghanistan is not revenge for New York and Washington. It is yet another act of terror against the people of the world." According to her, US president George W. Bush and UK prime minister Tony Blair were guilty of Orwellian doublethink:

When he announced the air strikes, President George Bush said: "We're a peaceful nation." America's favourite ambassador, Tony Blair, (who also holds the portfolio of prime minister of the UK), echoed him: "We're a peaceful people." So now we know. Pigs are horses. Girls are boys. War is peace.

She disputes US claims to be a peaceful and freedom-loving nation, listing China and 19 Third World "countries that America has been at war with—and bombed—since World War II", as well as previous US support for the Taliban movement and the Northern Alliance (whose "track record is not very different from the Taliban's"). She does not spare the Taliban:

"Now, as adults and rulers, the Taliban beat, stone, rape, and brutalise women, they don't seem to know what else to do with them."

In the final analysis, Roy sees American-style capitalism as the culprit:

"In America, the arms industry, the oil industry, the major media networks, and, indeed, U.S. foreign policy, are all controlled by the same business combines".

She puts the attacks on the World Trade Center and on Afghanistan on the same moral level, that of terrorism, and mourns the impossibility of beauty after 2001: "Will it be possible ever again to watch the slow, amazed blink of a newborn gecko in the sun, or whisper back to the marmot who has just whispered in your ear—without thinking of the World Trade Centre and Afghanistan?"

In May 2003, she delivered a speech titled "Instant-Mix Imperial Democracy (Buy One, Get One Free)" at Riverside Church in New York City, in which she described the United States as a global empire that reserves the right to bomb any of its subjects at any time, deriving its legitimacy directly from God. The speech was an indictment of the US actions relating to the Iraq War. In June 2005, she took part in the World Tribunal on Iraq, and in March 2006 she criticised President George W. Bush's visit to India, calling him a "war criminal".

=== India's nuclear weaponry ===
In response to India's testing of nuclear weapons in Pokhran, Rajasthan, Roy wrote The End of Imagination (1998), a critique of the Indian government's nuclear policies. It was published in her collection The Cost of Living (1999), in which she also crusaded against India's massive hydroelectric dam projects in the central and western states of Maharashtra, Madhya Pradesh, and Gujarat.

=== Israel ===
In August 2006, Roy, along with Noam Chomsky, Howard Zinn and others, signed a letter in The Guardian calling the 2006 Lebanon War a "war crime" and accusing Israel of "state terror". In 2007, Roy was one of more than 100 artists and writers who signed an open letter initiated by Queers Undermining Israeli Terrorism and the South West Asian, North African Bay Area Queers calling on the San Francisco International LGBT Film Festival "to honor calls for an international boycott of Israeli political and cultural institutions, by discontinuing Israeli consulate sponsorship of the LGBT film festival and not cosponsoring events with the Israeli consulate". During the 2021 Israel–Palestine crisis, she defended Hamas's rocket attacks, citing Palestinians' right to resistance. In December 2023, during Israel's bombing campaign in Gaza, Roy said: "If we say nothing about Israel's brazen slaughter of Palestinians, even as it is live-streamed into the most private recesses of our personal lives, we are complicit in it." In October 2024, Roy and thousands of other writers signed an open letter pledging to boycott Israeli cultural institutions. In February 2026, Roy withdrew from the Berlin International Film Festival, saying she was "disgusted" after jury president Wim Wenders said politics should be avoided and the jury members made "unconscionable statements" about Israel's actions in Gaza. Roy called the 2026 Iran war as "a continuation of the US-Israeli genocide in Gaza."

=== 2001 Indian parliament attack ===
Roy has raised questions about the investigation into the 2001 Indian Parliament attack and the trial of the accused. Mohammad Afzal Guru, a convict of 2001 parliament attack, according to her was being scapegoated. She pointed to irregularities in the judicial and investigative process in the case and maintains that the case remains unsolved. In a 2013 opinion piece for The Hindu, Roy wrote that Guru was not one of "the terrorists who stormed Parliament House on December 13th 2001" or among those who "opened fire on security personnel, apparently killing three of the six who died". In her book about Guru's hanging, she wrote that there is evidence of state complicity in the terrorist attack. In an editorial in The Hindu, journalist Praveen Swami wrote that Roy's evidence of state complicity was "cherry-picked for polemical effect". He was critical of her assertion that media and political parties were in collusion.

Roy also called for Guru's death sentence to be stayed while a parliamentary enquiry into these questions was conducted, and denounced press coverage of the trial. BJP spokesperson Prakash Javadekar criticised Roy for calling Afzal a "prisoner of war" and called her a "prisoner of her own dogma". Afzal was hanged in 2013. Roy called the hanging "a stain on India's democracy".

=== The Muthanga incident ===
In 2003, the Adivasi Gothra Maha Sabha, a social movement for Adivasi land rights in Kerala, organised a major land occupation of a piece of land of a former Eucalyptus plantation in the Muthanga Wildlife Reserve, on the border of Kerala and Karnataka. After 48 days, a police force was sent into the area to evict the occupants. One participant of the movement and a policeman were killed, and the leaders of the movement were arrested. Roy travelled to the area, visited the movement's leaders in jail, and wrote an open letter to the then Chief Minister of Kerala, A. K. Antony, saying: "You have blood on your hands."

=== Comments on 2008 Mumbai attacks ===
In an opinion piece for The Guardian in December 2008, Roy argued that the 2008 Mumbai attacks cannot be seen in isolation, but must be understood in the context of wider issues in the region's history and society such as widespread poverty, the Partition of India ("Britain's final, parting kick to us"), the atrocities committed during the 2002 Gujarat violence, and the ongoing Kashmir conflict. Despite this call for context, Roy stated in the article that she believes "nothing can justify terrorism", and calls terrorism "a heartless ideology". Roy warned against war with Pakistan, arguing that it is hard to "pin down the provenance of a terrorist strike and isolate it within the borders of a single nation state", and that war could lead to the "descent of the whole region into chaos". Salman Rushdie and others strongly criticised her remarks and condemned her for linking the Mumbai attacks with Kashmir and economic injustice against Muslims in India; Rushdie criticised Roy for attacking the iconic status of the Taj Mahal Palace and Tower. Indian writer Tavleen Singh called Roy's comments "the latest of her series of hysterical diatribes against India and all things Indian".

=== Criticism of Sri Lankan government ===
In an opinion piece in The Guardian, Roy pleaded for international attention to what she called a possible government-sponsored genocide of Tamils in Sri Lanka. She cited reports of camps into which Tamils were being herded as part of what she called "a brazen, openly racist war". She also said that the "Government of Sri Lanka is on the verge of committing what could end up being genocide" and described the Sri Lankan IDP camps where Tamil civilians are being held as concentration camps. The Sri Lankan writer Ruvani Freeman called Roy's remarks "ill-informed and hypocritical" and criticised her for "whitewashing the atrocities of the LTTE". Roy has said of such accusations: "I cannot admire those whose vision can only accommodate justice for their own and not for everybody. However, I do believe that the LTTE and its fetish for violence was cultured in the crucible of monstrous, racist, injustice that the Sri Lankan government and to a great extent Sinhala society visited on the Tamil people for decades".

=== Views on the Naxalites ===
Roy has criticised the Indian government's armed actions against the Naxalite-Maoist insurgency in India, calling it "war on the poorest people in the country". According to her, the government has "abdicated its responsibility to the people" and launched the offensive against Naxals to aid the corporations with whom it has signed Memoranda of Understanding. While she has received support from various quarters for her views, Roy's description of the Maoists as "Gandhians" raised a controversy. In other statements, she has described Naxalites as patriots "of a kind" who are "fighting to implement the Constitution, (while) the government is vandalising it".

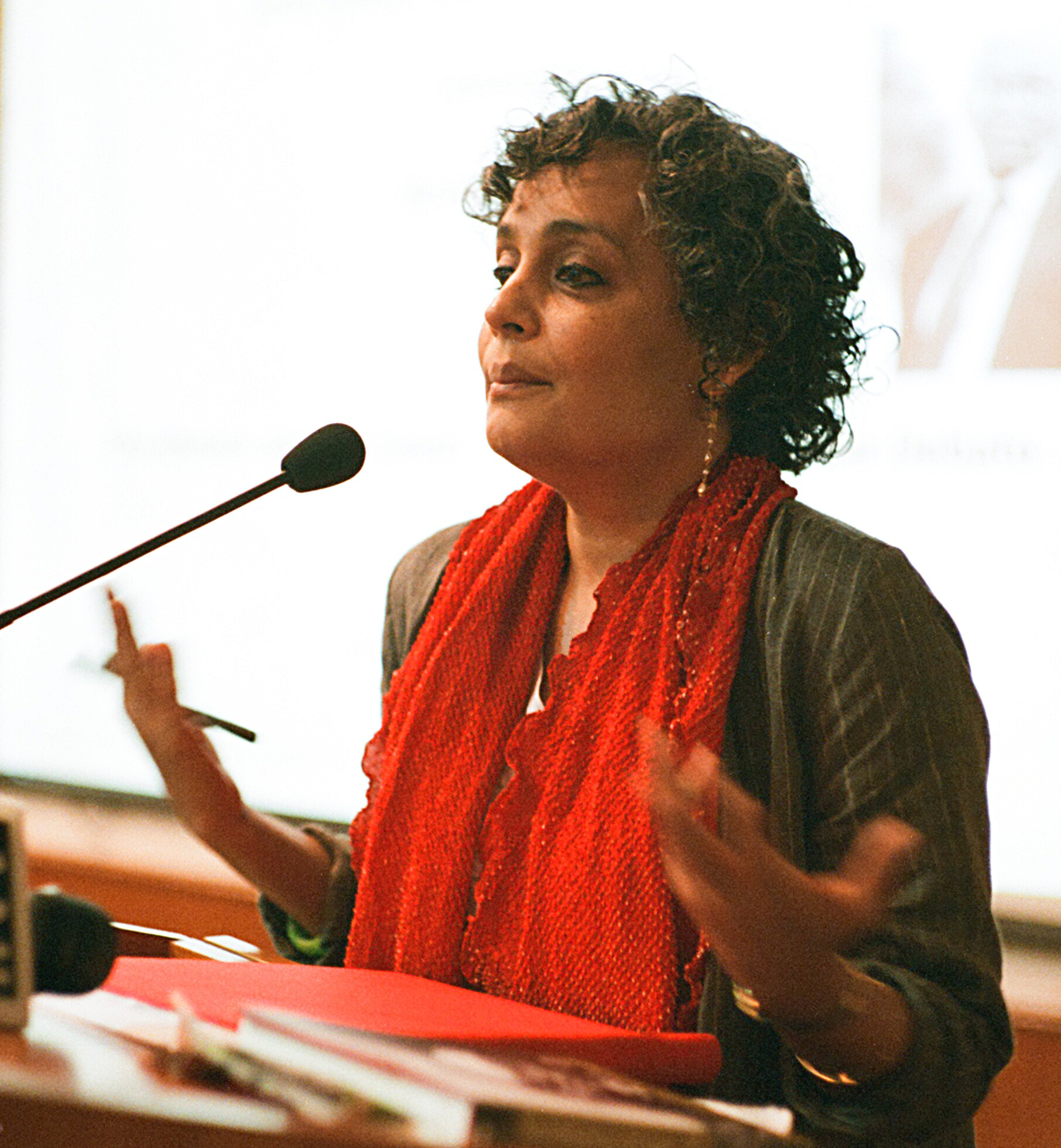
Roy at the Jamia Millia Islamia in March 2014

=== Sedition charges ===
In November 2010, Roy, Syed Ali Shah Geelani, and five others were brought up on charges of sedition by the Delhi Police. The filing of the First Information Report came after a directive from a local court on a petition filed by Sushil Pandit, who alleged that Geelani and Roy had made anti-India speeches at a conference on "Azadi—the Only Way" on 21 October 2010. Roy's words were: "Kashmir has never been an integral part of India. It is a historical fact. Even the Indian government has accepted this." A Delhi city court directed the police to respond to the demand for a criminal case after the central government declined to charge Roy, saying that the charges were inappropriate. In 2024, Lieutenant Governor of Delhi Vinai Kumar Saxena sanctioned the prosecution of Roy along with Sheikh Showkat Hussain, a former professor at Central University of Kashmir in the same 2010 case, with offences under 45(1) and 13 of the Unlawful Activities (Prevention) Act, 1967 and on prima facie basis with Indian Penal Code Sections 153A, 153B, 504, and 505.

=== Criticism of Anna Hazare ===
On 21 August 2011, at the height of Anna Hazare's anti-corruption campaign, Roy criticised Hazare and his movement in an opinion piece published in The Hindu. In the article, she questioned Hazare's secular credentials, pointing out the campaign's corporate backing, its suspicious timing, Hazare's silence on private-sector corruption, expressing her fear that the Lokpal will only end up creating "two oligarchies, instead of just one". She stated that while "his means may be Gandhian, his demands are certainly not", and alleged that by "demonising only the Government they" are preparing to call for "more privatisation, more access to public infrastructure and India's natural resources", adding that it "may not be long before Corporate Corruption is made legal and renamed a Lobbying Fee". Roy also accused the electronic media of blowing the campaign out of proportion. In an interview with Kindle Magazine, Roy pointed out the role of media hype and target audience in determining how well hunger strikes "work as a tool of political mobilization" by noting the disparity in the attention Hazare's fast has received in contrast to the decade-long fast of Irom Sharmila "to demand the repealing of a law that allows non-commissioned officers to kill on suspicion—a law that has led to so much suffering." Roy's comparison of the Jan Lokpal Bill with the Maoists, claiming both sought "the overthrow of the Indian State", met with resentment from members of Team Anna. Medha Patkar reacted sharply calling Roy's comments "highly misplaced" and chose to emphasise the "peaceful, non-violent" nature of the movement. Roy also has stated that "an 'anti-corruption' campaign is a catch-all campaign. It includes everybody from the extreme left to the extreme right and also the extremely corrupt. No one's going to say they are for corruption after all...I'm not against a strong anti-corruption bill, but corruption is just a manifestation of a problem, not the problem itself."

=== Views on Narendra Modi ===
In 2013, Roy called Narendra Modi's nomination as prime minister a "tragedy". She said business houses were supporting his candidacy because he was the "most militaristic and aggressive" candidate. She has argued that Modi has control over India to a degree unrecognised by most people in the Western world: "He is the system. He has the backing of the media. He has the backing of the army, the courts, a majoritarian popular vote ... Every institution has fallen in line." She has expressed deep despair for the future, calling Modi's long-term plans for a highly centralised Hindu state "suicidal" for the multicultural subcontinent. On 28 April 2021, The Guardian published an article by Roy describing the Indian government's response to the COVID-19 pandemic as a "crime against humanity", in which The Washington Post said Roy "slammed Modi for his handling of the pandemic". Roy's op-ed was also published in The Wire with the title "It's Not Enough to Say the Govt Has Failed. We Are Witnessing a Crime Against Humanity."

=== Remarks about National Registers and CAA ===
On 25 December 2019, while speaking at Delhi University, Roy urged people to mislead authorities during the upcoming enumeration by the National Population Register (NPR) by furnishing fake names, which she said could serve as a database for the National Register of Citizens (NRC). The remarks were criticised by the Congress and the Bharatiya Janata Party (BJP). Meanwhile, Amit Shah maintained that there was no link between NRC and NPR. A complaint against her was registered at Tilak Marg police station, Delhi, under sections 295A, 504, 153 and 120B of the Indian Penal Code. Roy responded, "What I was proposing was civil disobedience with a smile", and said her remarks had been misrepresented.

Roy criticised the Citizenship Amendment Act (CAA) that passed in 2019. She participated in several mass protests in New Delhi calling the law "dangerous" to India. In 2022, she joined the protest to commemorate the 2019 Jamia Millia Islamia attack. There, she compared CAA and NRC to Hitler's Nuremberg Laws. She said the laws represented a "Hindutva programme" and the government's plan to "ratchet up hatred". She told protesters, "Now that we have all come together, no detention centre will be big enough to fill us in. I hope that a day will come when this government, which is trying to break the nation, will be in the detention centre and we will be azaad [free]. We won't back down."

== Awards and recognition ==
Roy was awarded the 1997 Booker Prize for her novel The God of Small Things. The award carried a prize of approximately US$30,000 and a citation that noted, "The book keeps all the promises that it makes". Roy donated the prize money she received, as well as royalties from her book, to human rights causes. Prior to the Booker, Roy won the National Film Award for Best Screenplay in 1989, for the screenplay of In Which Annie Gives It Those Ones, in which she captured the anguish among the students prevailing in professional institutions. In 2015, she returned the national award in protest against religious intolerance and the growing violence by rightwing groups in India.

In 2002, she won the Lannan Foundation's Cultural Freedom Award for her work "about civil societies that are adversely affected by the world's most powerful governments and corporations", in order "to celebrate her life and her ongoing work in the struggle for freedom, justice and cultural diversity".

In 2003, she was awarded "special recognition" as a Woman of Peace at the Global Exchange Human Rights Awards in San Francisco with Bianca Jagger, Barbara Lee, and Kathy Kelly.

Roy was awarded the Sydney Peace Prize in May 2004 for her work in social campaigns and her advocacy of non-violence. That same year she was awarded the Orwell Award, along with Seymour Hersh, by the National Council of Teachers of English.

In January 2006, she was awarded the Sahitya Akademi Award, a national award from India's Academy of Letters, for her collection of essays on contemporary issues, The Algebra of Infinite Justice, but she declined to accept it "in protest against the Indian Government toeing the US line by 'violently and ruthlessly pursuing policies of brutalisation of industrial workers, increasing militarisation and economic neo-liberalisation'".

In November 2011, she was awarded the Norman Mailer Prize for Distinguished Writing.

Roy was featured in the 2014 list of Time 100, the 100 most influential people in the world.

St. Louis University gave Roy the 2022 St. Louis Literary Award, granted to the "most important writers of our time" to celebrate "the contributions of literature in enriching our lives". The award ceremony was on 28 April 2022.

In September 2023, Roy received the lifetime achievement award at the 45th European Essay Prize for the French translation of her book Azadi.

In June 2024, Roy was announced as winner of the annual PEN Pinter Prize, given by the human rights organisation English PEN to a writer who, in the words of late playwright Harold Pinter, casts an "unflinching, unswerving" gaze on the world and shows "fierce intellectual determination ... to define the real truth of our lives and our societies". English PEN chair Ruth Borthwick said Roy tells "urgent stories of injustice with wit and beauty".

In August 2024, Roy and Toomaj Salehi shared the Disturbing the Peace Award, a recognition the Vaclav Havel Center accords to courageous writers at risk. The award committee chair, Bill Shipsey, called them "wonderful exemplars of the spirit of Václav Havel".

On 10 October 2024, Roy named imprisoned British-Egyptian activist Alaa Abd El-Fattah as the international "writer of courage" with whom she chose to share the 2024 PEN Pinter Prize, announced at a ceremony at the British Library, where Roy delivered her acceptance speech. Author and journalist Naomi Klein also spoke, praising Roy's and Abd El-Fattah's work, and Lina Attalah, editor-in-chief of independent online Egyptian newspaper Mada Masr, accepted the award on Abd El-Fattah's behalf.

On 7–8 June 2024, Roy was awarded the Honorary Doctorate of Humane Letters by the American University of Beirut during AUB's 155th Commencement Exercises.

In March 2026, Roy's autobiography, Mother Mary Comes to Me, won the 2025 National Book Critics Circle Award for Memoir and Autobiography.

== Personal life ==
In 1984, Roy met independent filmmaker Pradip Krishen, who offered her a role as a goatherd in his award-winning movie Massey Sahib. They married the same year. They collaborated on a television series about India's independence movement and on two films, In Which Annie Gives It Those Ones (1989) and Electric Moon (1992). Disenchanted with the film world, Roy experimented with various fields, including running aerobics classes. Roy and Krishen are still married but live separately.

Roy is a cousin of Prannoy Roy, former head of the Indian television media group NDTV. She lives in Delhi. She reads, writes, and speaks English, Hindi, and Malayalam.

== Published works ==
=== Fiction ===
No.	Title	Publisher	Year	ISBN
1	The God of Small Things	Flamingo	1997	0-00-655068-1
2	The Ministry of Utmost Happiness	Hamish Hamilton	2017	0-241-30397-4

=== Non-fiction ===
No.	Title	Publisher	Year	ISBN
1	The End of Imagination	Kottayam: D.C. Books	1998	81-7130-867-8
2	The Cost of Living	Flamingo	1999	0-375-75614-0
3	The Greater Common Good	Bombay: India Book Distributor	1999	81-7310-121-3
4	The Algebra of Infinite Justice	Flamingo	2002	0-00-714949-2
5	Power Politics	Cambridge: South End Press	2002	0-89608-668-2
6	War Talk	Cambridge: South End Press	2003	0-89608-724-7
7	An Ordinary Person's Guide To Empire	Consortium	2004	0-89608-727-1
8	Public Power in the Age of Empire	New York: Seven Stories Press	2004	978-1-58322-682-7
9	The Checkbook and the Cruise Missile: Conversations with Arundhati Roy (Interviews by David Barsamian)	Cambridge: South End Press	2004	0-89608-710-7
10	The Shape of the Beast: Conversations with Arundhati Roy	New Delhi: Penguin	2008	978-0-670-08207-0
11	Listening to Grasshoppers: Field Notes on Democracy	New Delhi: Penguin	2010	978-0-670-08379-4
12	Broken Republic: Three Essays	New Delhi: Hamish Hamilton	2011	978-0-670-08569-9
13	Walking with the Comrades	New Delhi: Penguin	2011	978-0-670-08553-8
14	Kashmir: The Case for Freedom	Verso Books	2011	1-84467-735-4
15	The Hanging of Afzal Guru and the Strange Case of the Attack on the Indian Parliament	New Delhi: Penguin	2013	978-0-14-342075-0
16	Capitalism: A Ghost Story	Chicago: Haymarket Books	2014	978-1-60846-385-5
17	Things that Can and Cannot Be Said: Essays and Conversations (with John Cusack)	Chicago: Haymarket Books	2016	978-1-60846-717-4
18	The Doctor and the Saint: Caste, Race, and Annihilation of Caste (The Debate Between B. R. Ambedkar and M. K. Gandhi)	Chicago: Haymarket Books	2017	978-1-60846-797-6
19	My Seditious Heart: Collected Non-Fiction	Chicago: Haymarket Books	2019	978-1-60846-676-4
20	Azadi: Freedom, Fascism, Fiction	Haymarket Books	2020	978-164259-260-3
21	Mother Mary Comes to Me	UK: Hamish Hamilton	2025	978-166809-471-6

== See also ==
- List of Sahitya Akademi Award winners for English
- List of Indian writers
- List of peace activists
- Indian English literature
- Naxalite–Maoist insurgency
- Iraq War
