= In Which Annie Gives It Those Ones =

1989 Indian film directed by Pradip Krishen

- Paperback cover of the published screenplay
- Written by: Arundhati Roy
- Directed by: Pradip Krishen
- Starring: Roshan Seth; Arjun Raina; Arundhati Roy; Rituraj; Isaac Thomas; Divya Seth; Moses Uboh; Benoy Thomas; Himani Shivpuri; Raghuvir Yadav
- Country of origin: India
- Original language: English

Production
- Executive producer: Sandeep Singh Bedi
- Producer: Pradip Krishen
- Cinematography: Rajesh Joshi
- Editor: A. Thyagaraju
- Running time: 112 minutes

Original release
- Network: Doordarshan
- Release: 1989

In Which Annie Gives it Those Ones is a 1989 Indian English-language television film written by Arundhati Roy and directed by Pradip Krishen. It stars Arjun Raina as the title character, with Roshan Seth and Arundhati Roy in key roles. The film also features Shahrukh Khan and Manoj Bajpayee, both then struggling actors in the Delhi theatre circuit, in small but significant roles. Set in the 1970s, in the National Institute of Architecture, New Delhi, the plot revolves around Anand Grover, known as Annie, a misguided visionary who gets into trouble for making fun of the principal, Y.D. Billimoria known as Yamdoot.

The film was the recipient of two National Awards in 1989. It acquired a cult status in the years after it was made. The original print of the movie is lost. Previously, the only copies of the film in circulation were those that were recorded on video cassette recorder when the film was screened on Doordarshan. However, camera recordings of these video cassette tapes were also made, and subsequently posted on YouTube, where they are still available. The film was made for television and was never released theatrically. It was shown on Doordarshan in 1989.

The film was part-autobiographical, with Roy recounting her own experiences of studying at the School of Planning and Architecture, Delhi, a leading architecture institute in India. This was the first screenplay by Roy, the second movie by Krishen after his colonial-period drama Massey Sahib (1985). The film is noted for one of the earliest cinematic appearances of Shahrukh Khan.

== Plot ==
In 1974, Anand "Annie" Grover is victimized for making fun of his principal, Y. D. Billimoria (popularly known as Yamdoot or Hell's messenger), years ago. At the School of Planning and Architecture, New Delhi, Annie is repeating his fifth year for the fourth time. He spends his hours in the hostel which is the best part of his life, by "giving it those ones" – indulging in daydreams of social uplift. His latest idea is to plant fruit trees on either side of railway tracks, where rural India defecates daily. The faecal matter will provide the necessary compost for the trees, while the trains, with sprinklers attached, will automatically water the plants.

Annie keeps two hens in his room and earns a modest sum by selling their eggs, until one day his friend, Mankind, and his Ugandan roommate, Kasozi, make a roasted meal out of them. Soon, however, hirsute Arjun and his girlfriend Radha – a non-conformist student who steals cigarettes from Yamdoot and talks back to the teachers – present Annie with a rabbit.

Many adventures later, the day to submit the thesis draws near. Annie, urged by his friends, apologises to Yamdoot. A panel of judges calls the students one by one for their final interviews, and the tension mounts. Radha goes dressed in a saree but wears a man's hat to detract from her sober attire. To make sure that Annie gets a sympathetic hearing from the hostile panel, Radha and Arjun work out a plan. Just when Annie is called in, Yamdoot receives a phone call from his dominating, deep-voiced mother (who, in actuality, is Mankind). The trick works, and the weary panel gives Annie a good grade.

At the party after the graduation ceremony, Annie arrives with heavy books under his arm, his hair shaved off, and a butterfly painted on his head. He informs his friends that he has decided to study law and then sue Yamdoot.

An epilogue then reveals the fates of the characters: Papey returned to Ludhiana as a building contractor after failing to graduate, Lakes runs an interior design firm in South Delhi, Kasozi is the vice chairman of the Kampala Urban Development Authority, Mankind is the architect for a departmental store chain in Copenhagen, Arjun has become the second biggest commercial marigold farmer in India, Radha pivots towards writing but drowns to death in 1976 before she can complete her first novel, and Annie is appointed assistant professor of design at the National Institute of Architecture in 1977, a year after Yamdoot's retirement.

== Cast ==
- Roshan Seth as Yamdoot
- Arjun Raina as Annie
- Arundhati Roy as Radha
- Rituraj as Arjun
- Isaac Thomas as Mankind
- Moses Uboh as Kasozi
- Idries Malik as Papey
- Divya Seth as Lakes
- Jagan Shah as Bajaj (Medoo)
- Himani Shivpuri as Bijli (Cabaret dancer)
- Shahrukh Khan as Senior
- Neeraj Shah as Canteen Chhotu
- Shantanu Nagpal as Allaudin
- Dhianee Ji as a Canteen Boy
- Manoj Bajpayee as a Student
- Raghuvir Yadav as Cycle Cheapskate
- Sitaram Panchal as Sidekick Cop

== Awards ==
Year	Award	Category	Recipient	Result	Ref.
1989	National Film Awards	Best Feature Film in English	Pradeep Krishen	Won	
1989	National Film Awards	Best Screenplay	Arundhati Roy	Won	

== Restoration ==
The film restoration is done by Film Heritage Foundation in January 2026. The film was played at 76th Berlin International Film Festival held in Berlin, Germany. It was released in cinemas across India on March 13, 2026.
