= My Seditious Heart =

2019 novel by Arundhati Roy

- First edition
- Author: Arundhati Roy
- Language: English
- Genre: History; Indian Literature
- Publisher: Penguin Random House
- Publication date: 4 June 2019
- Publication place: India
- Pages: 989

My Seditious Heart is a 2019 essay collection by Indian writer Arundhati Roy. It was published on 4 June 2019 by Penguin Random House.

== Reception ==
The Telegraph wrote in a review "Roy’s 950-page tome is a sometimes lyrical, sometimes strident record of a country’s slide from a liberal secular centrist identity (albeit with a sliver of leftism/socialism) to a Hindu nation of capitalist inclination and extreme-right-wing faith."

The Guardian wrote in a review "Roy covers the aggressive appropriation of tribal rural lands for mining and water projects, the expansion of nuclear weapons programmes, the privatisation and commercialisation of Indian services, the legacies and continuation of colonisation and imperialism in various forms, government corruption, American warmongering and national hypocrisy."
