= Pradip Krishen =

Indian former filmmaker

- Born: 1949 (age 77); New Delhi, India
- Other name: Pradeep Krishen
- Occupations: Filmmaker; Naturalist; Environmentalist
- Years active: 1985–1995
- Notable work: In Which Annie Gives It Those Ones (1989)
- Spouse: Arundhati Roy (m. 1984; div. 2022)
- Children: 2
- Awards: National Film Award

Pradip Krishen (born 1949) is an Indian filmmaker, naturalist and environmentalist. He directed three films, Massey Sahib in 1985, In Which Annie Gives It Those Ones in 1989 and Electric Moon for Channel 4, UK in 1991. His films have won significant Indian and international awards. In Which Annie Gives It Those Ones acquired cult status in the years after it was made.

He subsequently gave up filmmaking and, since 1995, has worked as a naturalist and environmentalist.

== Education ==
Pradip Krishen was born in New Delhi in 1949 and educated at Mayo College and St. Stephen's College, then at Balliol College, Oxford. He taught history at Ramjas College of University of Delhi, New Delhi.

== Career ==
=== Film-making ===
Before becoming a documentary filmmaker, Krishen made popular science documentaries.

- Massey Sahib: 1985 Hindi movie about Francis Massey, who is the 'English Type Babu' at the Deputy Commissioner's office in a small, tribal district town of Central India in 1929. This film won 'Best Actor' Award for Raghuvir Yadav at the Delhi International Film Festival (1986) and the film won a FIPRESCI prize at the Venice Film Festival 1987.
- In Which Annie Gives It Those Ones: 1989 Indian English TV film which captured the prevailing anguish among students in professional institutions. It is based on the life of students in the School of Planning and Architecture. At the 1988 National Film Award it won the award for Best Feature Film in English, as well as Best Screenplay for Arundhati Roy.
- Electric Moon: A 1992 Channel 4 production that spoofed game-park tourists, erstwhile royals, social pretense, and ecology. At the 40th National Film Awards, the film won the award for Best Feature Film in English.

Krishen began work on a 21-episode television series intended for Doordarshan called Bargad / The Banyan Tree, a project he was forced to abandon before completion.

=== Environmental work ===
Starting in 1995, Krishen began studying trees and spending time in the jungles of Panchmarhi in Madhya Pradesh, with the help of a forester friend. Krishen taught himself field botany and began identifying and photographing Delhi's trees, extensively exploring the city's green habitat. In the course of his work, Krishen led numerous public "tree-walks" on Sunday mornings and became a keen ecological gardener. Krishen has created native-plant gardens in Delhi, west Rajasthan, and Garhwal, and is currently working on a large rewilding scheme at Rao Jodha Desert Rock Park near Mehrangarh fort in Jodhpur, Rajasthan. He was briefly associated with the Aga Khan Trust in an eco-initiative in the Sunder Nursery in New Delhi. In 2014, Krishen began work on a new gardening initiative at Abha Mahal in Nagaur Fort, Rajasthan. The following year, he took over as Project Director of the gardens of the Calico Museum in Ahmedabad, and most recently, leads a team of horticulturists and landscape architects to restore an extensive set of sand dunes in Jaipur city, Rajasthan.

Krishen's book Trees of Delhi: A Field Guide, published by Dorling Kindersley/Penguin Group in 2006, met with popular and critical acclaim, and became a best-seller in India.

Krishen's second book Jungle Trees of Central India, published by Penguin India, was released in 2014.

== Personal life ==
In 1984, he married Arundhati Roy, who also acted in his films. They divorced in 2022.

== Works ==
- Trees of Delhi: A Field Guide, by Pradip Krishen. Published by Dorling Kindersley (India), 2006. ISBN 0-14-400070-9.
- Jungle Trees of Central India, by Pradip Krishen. Published by Penguin Books, 2014. ISBN 9780143420743.
