= Kindle Magazine =

English-language journal published from Kolkata

Kindle
- Editor-in-Chief: Pritha Kejriwal
- Managing Editor: Maitreyi Kandoi
- Categories: Analytic Journalism, Politics, Social Issues, Economics, Arts, Science, Culture
- Publisher: Ink Publications Pvt. Ltd.
- Frequency: Monthly
- Country: India
- Language: English
- Website: kindlemag.in
- First Issue: August, 2008
- Last Issue: March, 2017
- Current Status: In hiatus since March, 2017. End of Life as of July 11, 2022

Kindle Magazine was an English-language national journal being published online from Kolkata, India. The magazine was founded in 2008 by journalist Pritha Kejriwal (formerly from Hindustan Times and NDTV) and Kolkata-based CFA Maitreyi Kandoi. The journal placed special emphasis on long-form journalism focusing on socio-political and cultural issues .at global level.

In 2013, the Kindle Magazine received a Special Jury Award from The Laadli Media and Advertising Awards for Gender Sensitivity.

== History ==
The magazine was launched in 2008 by journalist Pritha Kejriwal and Maitreyi Kandoi, a chartered financial analyst. It ran for 9 years and closed in 2017, the last published volume was dated March 2017 and featured a cover story on the recently deceased John Berger.

== Content ==
The special issues typically follow a theme or a cover story around which much of the content is organized, and usually features at least one in-depth interview with a prominent scholar or policy specialist on the cover story subject. The interviews have featured Shyam Benegal, Zoe Heller, Dibakar Banerjee, Mychael Danna, Edward Smith, Mallika Sarabhai, and Shobha De amongst others. Regular issues carry other interviews and opinion pieces, photo essays, and reviews of books, music, art or other cultural events. The magazine occasionally publishes poetry and short fiction. It also publishes separate editorial, informational and creative content online, along with articles from its print issues. The bulk of the content tends to be expository and analytic pieces.

=== Contributors ===
Kindle Magazine publishes a number of regular columns, reported from Kolkata, Delhi, Chennai, Srinagar, Lahore, New York, London, Singapore, Tibet, Bangladesh, Africa and Latin America. Columnists include various authors and journalists like Oscar Guardiola Rivera, Azad Essa, Nitasha Kaul, Dibyesh Anand, Amit Sengupta, Saswat Pattanayak, Teresa Rehman, Anuradha Bhasin Jamwal, Debashree Dattaray, and Neel Adhikari. Other contributors include members of the editorial staff as well as frequent guest feature writers such as Adrian Levy, Paranjoy Guha Thakurta, Gulzar, Jeet Thayil, K. Satchidanandan, Annie Zaidi, Jose Varghese, Brinda Bose, Poornima Joshi, Tabish Khair, Sharanya Manivannan, Kiran Nagarkar, Prof. Marcus du Sautoy, Sarnath Banerjee, amongst others.

== Events and community involvement ==
Kindle Magazine has conducted 2 Roundtable conferences in the Kolkata Town Hall on IndoPak peace and sedition respectively, featuring Mani Shankar Aiyar, Farooq Sheikh, Tarun Tejpal, Aruna Roy, Dr. Binayak Sen, Anand Patwardhan, Abhishek Singhvi, Tarun Vijay, Suhel Seth, Taimur Rahman, and others. The magazine launched its first international documentary film festival titled Owlscope: X-rays of the Republic (5–8 April 2013) that showcased documentary screenings from around the world and were screened at theaters, bookstores, campuses and lounges across Kolkata. Kindle Magazine also conducts regular workshops with noted personalities on various subjects including, creative writing, theatre, debate etc.

== Hiatus and possible end ==
Kindle Magazine ran uninterrupted since publication, producing scholarly works that consistently received positive critical reviews. However, editor and co-founder Pritha Kejriwal had noted the inherent financial difficulties involved in publishing such journals in the era when print media in general has struggled with progressively decaying revenue sources. While no explicit announcements were made by the publishers, the magazine has been inactive since early 2017. The latest available issue was published in March 2017.

In July 11, 2022, the official website Kindle Magazine was taken offline. No announcements were made, further suggesting that the magazine had shut its door for good. The website has since been reinstated, but no new content has appeared since 2017.
