= Cosmopolitan (film) =

- Directed by: Nisha Ganatra
- Written by: Sabrina Dhawan (screenplay); Akhil Sharma (short story)
- Produced by: Brian Devine; Jason Orans; Jen Small
- Starring: Roshan Seth; Carol Kane; Madhur Jaffrey; Purva Bedi
- Cinematography: Matthew Clark
- Music by: Andrew Lockington (score); Chris Rael (songs)
- Production companies: Gigantic Pictures; KTEH
- Distributed by: Gigantic Pictures; PBS; ITVS
- Release dates: 2003 (theatrical); 2004 (television)
- Running time: 53 minutes
- Country: United States
- Languages: English; Hindi

Cosmopolitan is a 2003 American independent film starring Roshan Seth and Carol Kane, and directed by Nisha Ganatra. The film, based on an acclaimed short story by Akhil Sharma and written by screenwriter Sabrina Dhawan (Monsoon Wedding), is a cross-cultural romance between a confused and lonely middle-aged Indian, who has lived in America for 20 years, and his exasperating, free-spirited blonde neighbour.

The film was released theatrically in 2003. It was televised nationally in 2004 on the PBS series Independent Lens.

== Plot ==
In an American suburb in Northern New Jersey, conservative, middle-aged Indian immigrant Gopal, a telephone-company engineer who has taken early retirement, is celebrating Diwali in November with his wife and grown daughter. His daughter suddenly tells him that she is leaving indefinitely to teach English in Mongolia with her German boyfriend. As Gopal recovers from this shock and tries to talk her out of it, largely on the grounds that she will be living in sin in his eyes, his wife Madhu announces that she is leaving him as well, and is taking up the spiritual life in an ashram in India.

Confused, mortified, bored, and directionless, newly single Gopal lies to his few Indian-American acquaintances about the situation, and refuses to answer his daughter's phone calls from Mongolia. He tries to cope with his emptiness by redecorating slightly, searching through the various corners of his small house, reading newspapers, and watching videos of Bollywood romance extravaganza films. Desperately lonely, he latches upon a copy of Cosmopolitan magazine that had belonged to his daughter, and takes a quiz gauging a man's suitability for a relationship – which reveals that he is a "Ditchable Dude".

In the midst of his distress and his Bollywood fantasies, Gopal's eccentric neighbor, the oddly attractive divorcée Mrs. Shaw – whom he had previously thought of as loose-moralled (because of her one-night stands) and slovenly – appears at his door asking to borrow one of his rakes. This sets off a whole new set of fantasies on his part. A few nights later Gopal sees her on her porch nursing a drink, and after a tentative conversation, asks her to have Thanksgiving dinner with him at home the next day. While cleaning and straightening for the date, Gopal finds several more of his daughter's Cosmopolitans, and reads several articles on "What women want" from a man – evidently it is for them to "listen, listen, listen".

With the help of the advice gleaned from the pages of Cosmopolitan, and to some extent in spite of it, Gopal and Mrs. Shaw (Helen) hit it off, and develop a warm, tender, intimate relationship. Mrs. Shaw is a high school counselor, and therefore a good and empathetic listener herself, and Gopal confides in her about his childhood dreams and sorrows.

But the relationship does not go exactly as Gopal had planned. On Christmas Day, when Helen gently rebuffs his insistence on his long-term vision for the relationship, Gopal is very upset and shouts at her to leave. He then holes up sullen and frustrated in his house, refusing all attempts at communication from her, and is visibly angry when he sees she has a male visitor nearly a week later.

On New Year's Eve, Gopal discovers Helen has left a Christmas gift for him, and it is something very meaningful to him. He breaks down, and something in him shifts – regarding the relationship, his family, and himself.

== Cast and characters ==
- Roshan Seth – Gopal, a retired middle-aged Indian immigrant, who has been in America 20 years, and who has been complacently wed since childhood in an arranged marriage to Madhu
- Carol Kane – Mrs. Shaw (Helen), Gopal's exasperating divorcée neighbour, who has conspicuous one-night stands and whose house and car are conspicuously unkempt in Gopal's eyes
- Madhur Jaffrey – Madhu, Gopal's wife
- Purva Bedi – Geetu, Gopal and Madhu's daughter, who has grown up in America and who is newly unemployed
- Yolande Bavan – Preema, Madhu's Indian-American friend, who is enthused about an MLM (multi-level marketing scheme)
- Taj Crown – Harish, Preema's husband, who is also an MLM convert
- Neerja Sharma – Vandana, Preema and Harish's daughter
- Kal Penn – Vandana's fiancé, a pre-med student
- Niket Subhedar – Young Gopal, whose life in India revolves around cricket
- Stephen Barker Turner – Hans, Geetu's German boyfriend, who takes her off to Mongolia to teach English and live in a yurt

== Cast information ==
Distinguished Indian actor Roshan Seth, a 20-year veteran of major American and British films, including lead roles in Gandhi, Mississippi Masala, Not Without My Daughter, My Beautiful Laundrette, and Indiana Jones and the Temple of Doom, was chosen for the starring role of Gopal, the suddenly single Indian patriarch. Seth had also played the groom's father in screenwriter Sabrina Dhawan's 2001 film, Monsoon Wedding.

Oscar-nominee Carol Kane, familiar to many as Latka's wife Simka on the sitcom Taxi, and noted also for her roles in Hester Street, Annie Hall, The Princess Bride, and Scrooged, was chosen to play Gopal's unconventional American neighbour, divorcée Mrs. Shaw. "There was no other (casting) choice" for Mrs. Shaw, said co-producer Jen Small, who had previously worked with Kane on the 1998 PBS film The First Seven Years. Director Nisha Ganatra agreed: "We wanted to take advantage of Carol's incredible comic timing, and that way she has of making you laugh and breaking your heart at the same time."

To round out the major cast, Ganatra chose Merchant-Ivory actress Madhur Jaffrey, who had been in her 1999 film Chutney Popcorn, to play Gopal's disgruntled wife. Up-and-comer 18-year-old Indian-American actress Purva Bedi (American Desi) was cast as Gopal's daughter Geetu.

According to Ganatra, it was interesting watching Roshan Seth's and Carol Kane's conflicting acting styles. "Seth comes from the British school of theater acting and believes that his job is to deliver a consistent performance. Kane comes from the American school, where improvisation rules and a certain performance may not be duplicated. Seth wanted lots of rehearsals; Kane thought too much practice would make her performance stale." Nevertheless, the two actors very much enjoyed working together.

== Script ==
Akhil Sharma's original short story "Cosmopolitan" initially appeared in The Atlantic Monthly, in January 1997. It was then anthologised and republished in the book The Best American Short Stories 1998, a selection of 20 short stories chosen by Garrison Keillor.

Producers Jen Small, Jason Orans, and Brian Devine found "Cosmopolitan", which they considered "a little gem", in the 1998 anthology. They signed award-winning screenwriter Sabrina Dhawan (Monsoon Wedding) to adapt it for their newly formed New York-based independent production company, Gigantic Pictures. "The rights to short stories are more accessible financially for small companies; and you can add, where a novel demands cutting", says Small.

Of the differences between adapting short stories versus novels, co-producer Jason Orans said, "Short stories are usually structured differently than movies. While a movie should have a three-act structure, a short story is often an exploration of character via a single defining event. The challenge is to create new material which both serves the story and supports a three-act structure. With Cosmopolitan, this meant [Sabrina Dhawan] adding a completely new first act to the story."

Director Nisha Ganatra, whose previous credits included the multiple-award-winning Chutney Popcorn, was also intrigued by Akhil Sharma's short story. In her words, "I thought, this is a story we haven't seen. Indian American filmmakers are making these stories that are very 'me, me, me' and the thing that I loved about Cosmopolitan is that it's about our parents and loneliness, and that I found was very universal and exciting."

Screenwriter Sabrina Dhawan adapted, expanded, and fleshed out Sharma's short story. The original short story was very focused on Gopal's loneliness, and his initial inability to make physical or emotional contact with anyone. Dhawan kept and expanded the story's poignancy, while changing the focus to Gopal's relationship with Mrs. Shaw, giving the story specificity and universal relevance, and infusing it with wit.

== Score and soundtrack ==
The score for the film was composed by Canadian-born composer Andrew Lockington, with whom director Nisha Ganatra, a fellow Canadian, had worked once before, on the 2003 film Fast Food High. The instrumental score includes string quartet, piano (performed by Lockington), clarinet, bansuri flute, and tabla drums.

The three Bollywood-parody songs, "Meri Desi Rani", "Come to Me", and "Destiny", were written, composed, and produced by eclectic New York Indo-pop pioneer Chris Rael. The songs were performed by Rael along with eight members of his Indo-pop band Church of Betty, and Rael also sang the male leads of the songs.

Two of Rael's three Bollywood-parody songs in the film have dance numbers. One Bollywood-parody dance number features Kane, and the main dance number features Kane and Seth. Of his dancing in the main Bollywood number, Roshan Seth confessed, "I'm really quite spastic when it comes to all that, and uncoordinated, but Carol was very funny and we somehow got through it."

== Production ==
=== Funding ===
According to co-producer Jason Orans, the production team "fell in love with the story and were determined to make it from the moment we found out the rights were available. However, we were writing grant proposals for over two years before any funding was promised." The team used the immigrant-adrift-in-America theme of the story to garner major funding from the Corporation for Public Broadcasting's Diversity Initiative, and from the National Asian American Telecommunications Association. Funding was also obtained from the National Endowment for the Arts.

=== Filming ===
Most of the film was shot in New Jersey in January 2003. The film's Bollywood street dance number was shot in New York City's Jackson Heights, where colourful Indian-American signage helped make a ready-made outdoor set. Ganatra observes humorously that the outdoor dance number "kept getting pushed on the schedule because of weather, and we finally did it on the coldest day of the year with the poor actors in saris".

A few shooting locations had to be changed, and often the replacement locations turned out to be more interesting than those originally planned. A scene meant to take place in a large major bookstore could not be achieved, so it was shot in a little sweets shop attached to a restaurant the filmmakers were already shooting in. Co-producer Jason Orans says, "This became one of my favorite shots in the film, very colorful, evocative, and (naturally) sweet."

Cosmopolitan was filmed in 24P HD. For airing on PBS, the length of the film was trimmed by nearly three minutes; the television broadcast version and the DVD release run 53 minutes.

== Release, broadcast, and home video ==
Cosmopolitan premiered on the opening night of the 2003 Indo-American Arts Council Film Festival, on November 5, 2003 at Lincoln Center in New York City. It screened at South by Southwest in March 2004, and also screened at other film festivals including the Mumbai International Film Festival (2003), the Indian Film Festival of Los Angeles (2004), the San Francisco International Asian American Film Festival (2004), the San Diego Film Festival (2004), the San Diego Asian Film Festival (2004), the Woodstock Film Festival (2004), the Wisconsin Film Festival (2005), the Ashland Independent Film Festival (2005), and INPUT (2005). Other screenings have included the Dallas South Asian Film Festival (2004), the South Asian Film Festival (Orlando, Florida, 2004), the Filmi South Asian Film Festival (2004), and the New Jersey Independent South Asian Cine Fest (2007).

The film was televised nationally beginning in June 2004 on the PBS series Independent Lens. The DVD is available from Gigantic Pictures on its official website. The film is also available on streaming services such as Amazon Video.

== Critical reception ==
Cosmopolitan was selected as one of 10 American PBS programs screened at INPUT 2005, an international conference on the best in public television. It was the only narrative film to have that distinction.

The film has received very favorable print reviews, and was variously described as "charming," "wry", "touching", and "hilarious" by Variety, Newsday, Time Out New York, and The Southeast Asian. The Boston Phoenix noted the film's "superb performances". New Beats remarked that screenwriter Dhawan and director Ganatra "capture the sense of suburban desolation in Gopal's world and the vivaciousness of Bollywood in the fantasy sequences. ... [D]epicting love so realistically with a sense of whimsy ... makes [the film] engaging."

The Associated Press called Cosmopolitan a "witty and tender depiction of mature romance". And the Austin Chronicle wrote, "Director Nisha Ganatra has crafted a frothy yet poignant valentine to first-generation immigrants longing for their home country while forging a new life in their adopted one, and a celebration of the romantic lurking within even the most resigned-to-loneliness heart."

Ronnie Sheib in Variety noted the "friendly cross-cultural fireworks" between Roshan Seth and Carol Kane, and stated that "[c]hemistry between leads spikes in quirky arcs, with fantasy Bollywood musical sequences livening up tender moments." Calling the film "charming", he opined that the film "suffers slightly from tasteful restraint and numbers are often more pleasing in concept than execution", but also felt that the film "successfully sidesteps [a] rarified, over-literary small-screen look". Carol Kane as Mrs. Shaw is praised for her nuanced performance: "Such is the power of Kane's oddball sweetness that she is able to invest these scenes with amazing emotional resonance. Overweight and without makeup, Kane has a vulnerability that reads as a rare form of courage." And director Nisha Ganatra is noted for "ground[ing] Kane's feyness in workaday experience and middle-aged acceptance, making her the perfect vehicle for Seth's long-delayed voyage of self-discovery".

== See also ==
- Desi
