= Nisha Ganatra =

Canadian-American film director and actress (born 1974)

- Born: June 25, 1974 (age 52); Vancouver, British Columbia, Canada
- Education: New York University
- Occupations: Actress; filmmaker
- Years active: 1996–present

Nisha Ganatra (born June 25, 1974) is a Canadian-American film director, screenwriter, producer, and actress of Indian descent. She wrote, directed, and produced the independent comedy drama Chutney Popcorn (1999) and later directed the independent film Cosmopolitan (2003) and the romantic-comedy Cake (2005). Ganatra has directed for numerous television shows, including The Real World, Transparent, You Me Her, Better Things, and Brooklyn Nine-Nine. She also directed the comedy-dramas Late Night (2019) and The High Note (2020). Ganatra served as a consulting producer on the first season of Transparent, for which she was nominated for the 2015 Primetime Emmy Awards for Outstanding Comedy Series. She directed Freakier Friday, the sequel to Disney's 2003 film starring Jamie Lee Curtis and Lindsay Lohan, which was released in theaters on August 8, 2025.

== Early life and education ==
Ganatra explored her interest in film through acting and then decided to make the switch to pursue film-making as she wanted to effect cultural change.

Ganatra began her film-making journey by studying at The University of California, Los Angeles (UCLA). Though she wasn't studying film, she explored her interest by sneaking into screenwriting classes which eventually led her to creating short films.

She moved to New York City to pursue a film degree at New York University Film School (NYU). During her time there, she created a short film Junky Punky Girlz (1997) which won NYU's Tisch Fellowship and most outstanding short film from PBS. Ganatra graduated from the New York University (NYU) Tisch School of the Arts.

== Career ==
While in film school, Ganatra directed several episodes of MTV's long-running television series The Real World in 2001. Prior to this she had written and directed two shorts and her independent film Chutney Popcorn (1999).

Ganatra is part of a mentorship program with NBC which seeks to provide talented female directors with the same opportunities as their male counterparts. This program selects female directors to be given the opportunity to shadow up to three episodes of an NBC series. The participants will then be able to direct at least one episode of the series in which she has been shadowing.

When Ganatra was on the hunt for a cinematographer, she began to notice that the men's reels were far superior compared to the women's reels. As a female director herself, she was accustomed to being overlooked in the hiring process in favor of men. She realized that the men had better reels not because they were more talented, but instead, because they had been given bigger budgets, better equipment, larger crews, and elaborate productions. This motivated Ganatra to hire a female cinematographer and strive to hire female crews. In 2020, it was reported that ABC had put into development a single-camera matchmaking comedy written, directed, and produced by Ganatra; however, the film didn't reach frutition.

== Personal life ==
Ganatra is a lesbian.

== Filmography ==
Short film

Year	Title	Director	Writer	Producer
1996	Junky Punky Girlz	Yes	Yes	No
1997	Drown Soda	Yes	Yes	Yes
2014	Code Academy	Yes	Yes	Yes

=== Film ===
Director

- Chutney Popcorn (1999) (Also writer and producer)
- Fast Food High (2003)
- Cake (2005)
- Late Night (2019)
- The High Note (2020)
- Freakier Friday (2025)

Actor

Year	Title	Role
1999	Chutney Popcorn	Reena
2000	The Acting Class	Exotic Dancer
2005	Bam Bam and Celeste	Linda
2011	Small, Beautifully Moving Parts	Mother

=== Television ===
Year	Title	Director	Producer	Notes
2001	The Real World: Back to New York	Yes	No	4 episodes
2002	The Real World/Road Rules: Battle of the Seasons	Yes	No	1 episode
2011	Futurestates	Yes	No	1 episode, also writer
2012	Haven	Yes	No	1 episode
2012	Big Time Rush	Yes	No	1 episode
2014	Transparent	Yes	Consulting	3 episodes
2015	The Mindy Project	Yes	No	1 episode
2015	Mr. Robot	Yes	No	Episode 4
2015	Married	Yes	No	3 episodes
2015	Red Oaks	Yes	No	2 episodes
2016	Shameless	Yes	No	1 episode
2016	Brooklyn Nine-Nine	Yes	No	1 episode
2016	You Me Her	Yes	Co-executive	10 episodes
2016	Better Things	Yes	Co-executive	3 episodes
2017	Girls	Yes	No	1 episode
2017	Dear White People	Yes	No	2 episodes
2017	Fresh Off the Boat	Yes	No	1 episode
2017	Future Man	Yes	No	2 episodes
2018	Love	Yes	No	2 episodes
2019	Black Monday	Yes	No	1 episode
2022	And Just Like That...	Yes	No	2 episodes
2022	Welcome to Chippendales	Yes	No	2 episodes

TV movies

Year	Title	Director	Writer	Producer
2003	Cosmopolitan	Yes	No	No
2008	The Cheetah Girls: One World	No	Yes	No
2013	The Hunters	Yes	No	Yes
2013	Pete's Christmas	Yes	No	Yes
2016	Center Stage: On Pointe	No	Yes	No

Field producer

- Margaret Cho: Beautiful (2009)
- Cho Dependent (2011)

== See also ==
- List of female film and television directors
- List of lesbian filmmakers
- List of LGBTQ-related films directed by women
