= Chris Rael =

American songwriter

Chris Rael is an eclectic American musician, singer, composer, and songwriter.

He is the founder and leader of Indo-pop band Church of Betty, based in New York City. He has composed, recorded, and produced more than 25 CDs, collaborating with artists from around the world. He is the founder of indie label Fang Records, and has produced hundreds of live events in downtown New York City.

Rael was a pioneer in the progressive music movement at the original Knitting Factory in New York in the 1980s. Throughout the 1990s, he studied Hindustani classical singing and sitar in Varanasi, India, forging a world-orchestral-pop style. The Village Voice has noted that “Chris Rael has consistently blended rock and Indian music better than any Western guitar guy, ever.” He produced Najma Akhtar's 1996 album, Forbidden Kiss.

His genres, besides Indo-pop, include progressive, chamber, and film/theater music. He composed and produced three Bollywood-parody songs for the 2003 film Cosmopolitan. In 2005, he received the Outstanding Soundtrack Award, out of a field of 230 film composers, at the Outfest Gay and Lesbian Film Festival in Los Angeles, for the Lower East Side Biography Project's Queer Realities and Cultural Amnesia. He wrote and composed Araby, a musical based on James Joyce’s Dubliners, which has been performed at Dixon Place in New York City.

Rael has been featured in The New York Times and Billboard and on NPR.

He has performed around the world, including venues in the UK, Europe, Australia, India, Mexico, and across the U.S. He also traveled the world with his then wife, performance artist Penny Arcade, performing their two-person show Rebellion Cabaret.

== See also ==
- Johnny Society
