= Bitch! Dyke! Faghag! Whore! =

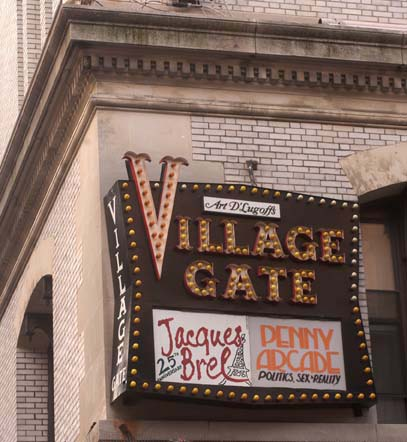
The marquee of the now-defunct Village Gate nightclub in New York City still bears the name of the performance, one of the nightclub's last.

Bitch! Dyke! Faghag! Whore! (or B!D!F!W!) is an internationally toured show by performer Penny Arcade. Like many of her shows, it combines erotic dancing, improvisation, comedy, audience participation, and monologue. Themes include AIDS, pornography, censorship and prostitution. It helped form an international gay burlesque scene and has played a substantial role in the gay shame movement.

== History ==
B!D!F!W! was created in 1990 partly in response to Senator Jesse Helms's amendment banning the National Endowment of the Arts (NEA) from providing funds for "obscene or indecent art". In 2009, Arcade told the Bay Area Reporter: "It was me kind of saying, 'Fuck you' to them." The show has been a hit success despite no funding from the NEA, in part through word of mouth and positive reviews. Although B!D!F!W! is Arcade's most well-known work, it has garnered very little attention from the mainstream press. Instead, the show relies on what she calls "The Drag Factor": "People drag their friends along from home and from work. In New York people were coming every night and telling me their therapist had recommended the show."

The show continues to evolve, in part from the improvisational nature of the performance. It has been credited with helping form an international gay burlesque scene and has played a substantial role in the gay shame movement. The show has had over 1,500 performances in over 22 cities internationally.

== Themes ==
Largely about sex, politics and self-censorship, the show humanizes and dignifies the roles portrayed while remaining true to the roles. Instead of presenting a role as one way or the other, the intent is to be true to the essence of the roles. Says Penny Arcade:

"I hate the politically correct tendency. When you have a PC movement, you have people who don't think, and as soon as people give up their capacity for inquiry you have the basis for totalitarianism."

She hires local erotic dancers for her shows, who perform on stage and around the audience. At one point, there is an audience breakout section: audience members go onto the stage and start dancing. As in all her shows, speaking personally to the audience is an important part of the performance.
