= AD-PUT =

African international public broadcasting service

Africa and Diaspora Public Television (ADPUT) Screening Conference is Africa's version of INPUT. It is modeled on the same international public television organization that is dedicated to television as public service and in the public interest, yet ADPUT focuses on Africa's own specific public broadcast challenges.

== History ==
PBS in Africa lacks support mechanisms to help it keep up with technological developments that influence and change viewing patterns and trends. AD-PUT is intended as a forum to help safeguard principles of television in the public interest and defend the democratic heritage of public participation within the public broadcast service while keeping up with technological changes. The effort is based on Decision 69 of the African Union Assembly, Second Ordinary Session 2003,, as well as pronouncements of the "Global Diaspora Summit" of African Union Heads of State Diaspora/Assembly/AU/Decl/(I). In consideration of the power of PBS to reach even the lower income groups, the decision to model AD-PUT on the International Public Television Screening Conference (INPUT) format of screening conferences and workshops was regarded as the best way to address the Africa specific television experiences of Public Broadcast Service problems directly. This was also meant to address the fact that African representation at every edition of INPUT-TV.org has been close to zero, including the two instances hosted in South Africa.
