= Sabrina Dhawan =

Indian screenwriter and producer

- Born: Sabrina Dhawan; London, England
- Spouse: Steve Cohen (m. 2006–2012)
- Writing career
- Years active: 2000–present
- Subjects: Indian family life, women screenwriters, Indian film

Sabrina Dhawan is an Indian screenwriter and producer, born in England and raised in Delhi, India.

Dhawan is a Professor and the area head of screenwriting at the Tisch School of the Arts, New York University. She has been commissioned to write for many large companies including Disney, HBO, ABC Family and 20th Century Fox. She has taught at filmmaking labs all over the world.

Dhawan is most well known for her writing credits on various feature-length films, as well as some producing and directing work on her own independent short films. She works a great deal within Indian and Bollywood cinema. Monsoon Wedding, a 2001 film directed by Mira Nair, is one of her earliest and most well known works, launching her screenwriting career.

Dhawan has a brief acting cameo in Monsoon Wedding as a wedding guest.

== Early life ==
Dhawan was born in England and raised in Delhi. Dhawan attended both the Convent of Jesus and Mary as well as Delhi Public School for her elementary education. She then went on to Hindu College to obtain her Bachelor of Arts and to Leicester University, U.K. for a Masters of Arts in Communications Research. Dhawan then moved to New York City, where she graduated from Columbia University's Graduate Film Program in 2001 with a Masters of Fine Arts in Film.

Her student short film, (Saanjh) As Night Falls, which she made during the last years of her MFA, has been successful since its release in 2000.

== Career ==
Graduating from Columbia in 2001, the same year as the release of Monsoon Wedding, Dhawan's career was almost immediate. In fact, Dhawan wrote the first draft of the screenplay while she was still in school - it only took her about a week. Fusing Hindi, Punjabi, and English, Dhawan wrote the multi-lingual script for Monsoon Wedding. The film was premiered in the Marché du Film section of the 2001 Cannes Film Festival and was nominated for various awards, including a Golden Globe.

After their pairing on Monsoon Wedding, Dhawan and Nair formed a brief partnership in which Dhawan worked as Nair's assistant at Columbia sometime in the early 2000s. She also wrote the segment "India" (directed by Nair) in 11'09"01 September 11, a series of short films for Canal Plus in 2002.

Dhawan's short film (Saanjh) As Night Falls was awarded the Best of the Festival at the Palm Springs International Festival of Short Films. It also received the Audience Award at Angelus Awards; and was voted "Most Original Film," by New Line Cinema at the Polo Ralph Lauren New Works Festival in 2000.

In 2009, Dhawan acted as co-producer for the first three episodes of a TV Series titled Bollywood Hero.

In 2016, Dhawan co-wrote the film Rangoon, with Vishal Bharadwaj and Matthew Robbins.

Dhawan worked with Mira Nair to create a stage adaptation of Monsoon Wedding which ran at the Berkeley Repertory Theater in California in 2017.

== Personal life ==
In 2006, Dhawan married Steve Cohen, who wrote the screenplay for The Bachelor (1999) starring Chris O'Donnell and Renée Zellweger. Cohen died on 29 September 2012.

As of 2016 Dhawan was living in New York City with their son, Kabir.

== Filmography ==
Year	Film	Role	Genre
2000	(Saanjh) As Night Falls	Writer/Director	Fiction Short
2001	Monsoon Wedding	Writer	Fiction (Film)
2002	11'09"01 September 11 ("India")	Writer	Fiction Short
2003	Cosmopolitan	Writer	Fiction (TV)
2004	Independent Lens	Writer (2 episodes)	TV documentary
2009	Kaminey	Writer	Fiction (Film)
2010	Ishqiya	Writer	Fiction (Film)
2011	Bollywood: The Greatest Love Story Ever Told	Writer	Documentary
2013	Matru Ki Bijlee Ka Mandola	Script Consultant	Fiction
2016	Rangoon	Writer	Fiction (Film)

== Awards and nominations ==
Year	Festival/Institution	Award	Film	Result
2000	Palm Spring International Festival of Short Films	Best of the Festival	(Saanjh) As Night Falls	Won
2001	Venice Film Festival	Golden Lion	Monsoon Wedding	Won
2002	Venice Film Festival	Best Short Film	11'09"01 September 11	Won
2002	Venice Film Festival	UNESCO Award	11'09"01 September 11	Won
2002	Zee Cine Awards	Special Award for International Cinema	Monsoon Wedding	Won
2002	Golden Globe	Best Foreign Language Film	Monsoon Wedding	Nominated
2002	BAFTA Awards	Best Film Not in the English Language	Monsoon Wedding	Nominated
2002	Awards Circuit Community Awards	Best Foreign Language Film	Monsoon Wedding	Nominated
2002	British Independent Film Awards	Best Foreign Independent Film - Foreign Language	Monsoon Wedding	Won
2003	Golden Satellite Awards	Best Motion Picture, Foreign Language	Monsoon Wedding	Nominated
2003	César Awards (France)	Best European Union Film	11'09"01 September 11	Nominated
2003	National Board of Review (US)	Freedom of Expression Award	11'09"01 September 11	Won
2004	Director's View Film Festival	Feature Documentary	Independent Lens	Won
2004	San Diego Film Festival	Best Short Film	Independent Lens	Won
2004	Toronto ReelWorld Film Festival	Best International Short Film	Independent Lens	Won
2010	Filmfare Awards	Best Film	Kaminey	Nominated
2010	International Indian Film Academy Awards	Best Picture	Kaminey	Nominated
2011	International Indian Film Academy Awards	Best Screenplay	Ishqiya	Nominated
2011	International Indian Film Academy Awards	Best Dialogue	Ishqiya	Won
