= Penny Arcade (performer) =

American performance artist, playwright and actress

- Born: Susana Carmen Ventura; July 15, 1950 (age 76); New Britain, Connecticut, U.S.
- Occupations: Performance artist; actress; playwright
- Spouse: Chris Rael (m. 1998)
- Awards: Guggenheim Fellowship (2026)

Penny Arcade (born Susana Carmen Ventura, July 15, 1950) is an American performance artist, actress, and playwright based in New York City. She is known for her comedic wit, forthright delivery, and stage presence. Her performances explore topics such as gentrification, humanity, womanhood, LGBT culture, nostalgia, family history, and the life of the outsider. Additionally, Arcade is known for her association with underground arts and culture. On April 14, 2026, she was named a Guggenheim Fellow.

== Early years ==
Susana Ventura was born in New Britain, Connecticut, and grew up in a working class Italian immigrant family. Her father fell ill from a severe beating he endured at Ellis Island in 1946, and in 1953 he was committed to Connecticut Valley Hospital in Middletown, Connecticut. He died there 12 years later of a heart attack at age 50. Arcade and her three siblings were raised by Arcade's mother, who worked as a seamstress in local sweatshops. The family was presided over by her maternal grandparents, both born in the 19th century in a remote Southern Italian village of Picerno, Basilicata.

As a child, Arcade did not plan to become a performance artist. In her working-class Italian-American family, there "just wasn't a format for that," she explained.

Of her early social experiences, Arcade described, "I was perceived to be this girl that everyone had slept with when I was 12 -- no one anyone knew, but they had heard." At age 13, she ran away from home and spent 4 weeks homeless in Old Saybrook, Connecticut. During this time, she was brought to juvenile court and sentenced to two years at the Sacred Heart Academy for Wayward Girls, a reform school run by the semi-cloistered Sisters Of The Good Shepherd. It was there that Arcade wrote her first play at age 14. At age 16, Arcade left home and spent the summer of 1967 homeless in Provincetown, Massachusetts, before ultimately moving to New York City.

== Early career ==
Arcade adopted the name "Penny Arcade" after an LSD trip with her mentor Jamie Andrews, who took her into his home when she moved to New York. Andrews introduced Arcade to John Vacarro.

Ventura's association with avant-garde performance began at age 17, when she became a member of John Vaccaro's Playhouse of the Ridiculous. In 1968, she appeared in painter Larry Rivers film T.I.T.S. In 1969, she starred in the Jackie Curtis play Femme Fatale at La MaMa Etc. with Curtis, Mary Woronov, Jayne County and Patti Smith, followed by a small role in the Paul Morrissey / Andy Warhol film, Women in Revolt. In 1970, Arcade was featured in her first interview in Rags Magazine, an alternative fashion magazine.

== Time in Europe ==
At age 20, Arcade left New York for Europe, where she lived for a decade. In 1971, Arcade turned down a role in the London production of Andy Warhol's play Pork, choosing instead to join Vaccaro and The Playhouse of the Ridiculous in Amsterdam. After eight months in Amsterdam, she moved to the island of Formentera in Spain's Balearic Islands. She has described her time in Europe as fodder for a "...great and scandalous memoir...drinking with sailors as a bargirl, starting a school for the children of drug smugglers, befriending and being befriended by Robert Graves at the end of his life... well, it goes on."

== Return to New York ==
Arcade returned to New York City in 1981 to appear in The Playhouse of The Ridiculous's remounting of their 1970 hit Night Club by Kenneth Bernard for LaMama's 20th anniversary at Ellen Stewart's request. She worked with underground theatre artists, including Jack Smith, Charles Ludlam, and the founder of The Cockettes and Angels of Light, Hibiscus. In the spring of 1982 she improvised her first performance piece in Hibiscus’s show Tinsel Town Tirade at Theater for The New City, receiving her first writer's credit.

In February 1985, Arcade presented her first full-length evening of original improvised work, While You Were Out, at the Poetry Project, and then presented it at Performance Space 122 in June later that same year. While You Were Out then moved to University of The Streets in November 1985 and continued to run for an additional four months.

Arcade was featured in 1988 Vogue Magazine's "People Are Talking About" issue, the first mention of performance art in a national fashion magazine. In the late 1980s, she created a character named Margo Howard-Howard, a 50-year-old drag queen with a scandalous past, for her performances. The New York Times refers to the character as "patently unbelievable", but in a later article acknowledges that her monologue was "based on real Lower East Side residents." Howard-Howard received an obituary in The Village Voice.

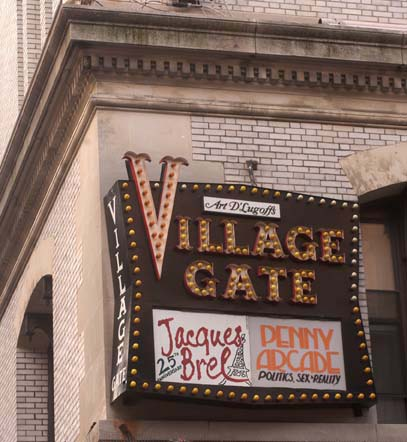
The Village Gate Sign on the corner of Thompson and Bleecker streets, January 2006

Premiering in 1990 at Performance Space 122, and running off broadway at The Village Gate 1992-1993 Arcade began touring internationally in 1993 with her most presented show, Bitch! Dyke! Faghag! Whore!, an opinionated commentary on sexuality and censorship that features a chorus of professional erotic dancers and strippers which created the international neo performance burlesque movement In 1998 she performed at the first Gay Shame event at DUMBA in Brooklyn; she appears in the documentary film of the event by Scott Berry, entitled Gay Shame '98. She co-starred with Quentin Crisp in the long-running performance/interview piece, The Last Will and Testament of Quentin Crisp

Arcade's 2002 performance New York Values, which also toured abroad, addressed the loss of cultural identity in New York during the Giuliani years. The Village Gate marquee in New York is still adorned with her name and the title of her performance piece Politics, Sex & Reality, although the nightclub no longer exists.

Arcade is a co-founder of the Lower East Side Biography Project, "Stemming The Tide Of Cultural Amnesia, with long time collaborator Steve Zehentner, a video production and oral history that began as a workshop that trains participants in documentary filmmaking and preserves the stories of Lower Manhattan artists and activists. profiled individuals have included Judith Malina, Lee Breuer, Tom O'Horgan, Sarah Schulman, Betty Dodson, Quentin Crisp, ], Jayne County, Danny Fields and Marty Matz, among others.

In 2002 Arcade ran for the New York State Assembly as a candidate of the Green Party. She received 1,054 votes out of 32,976 in the 74th Assembly district, losing to incumbent and anti-rent control advocate Steven Sanders.

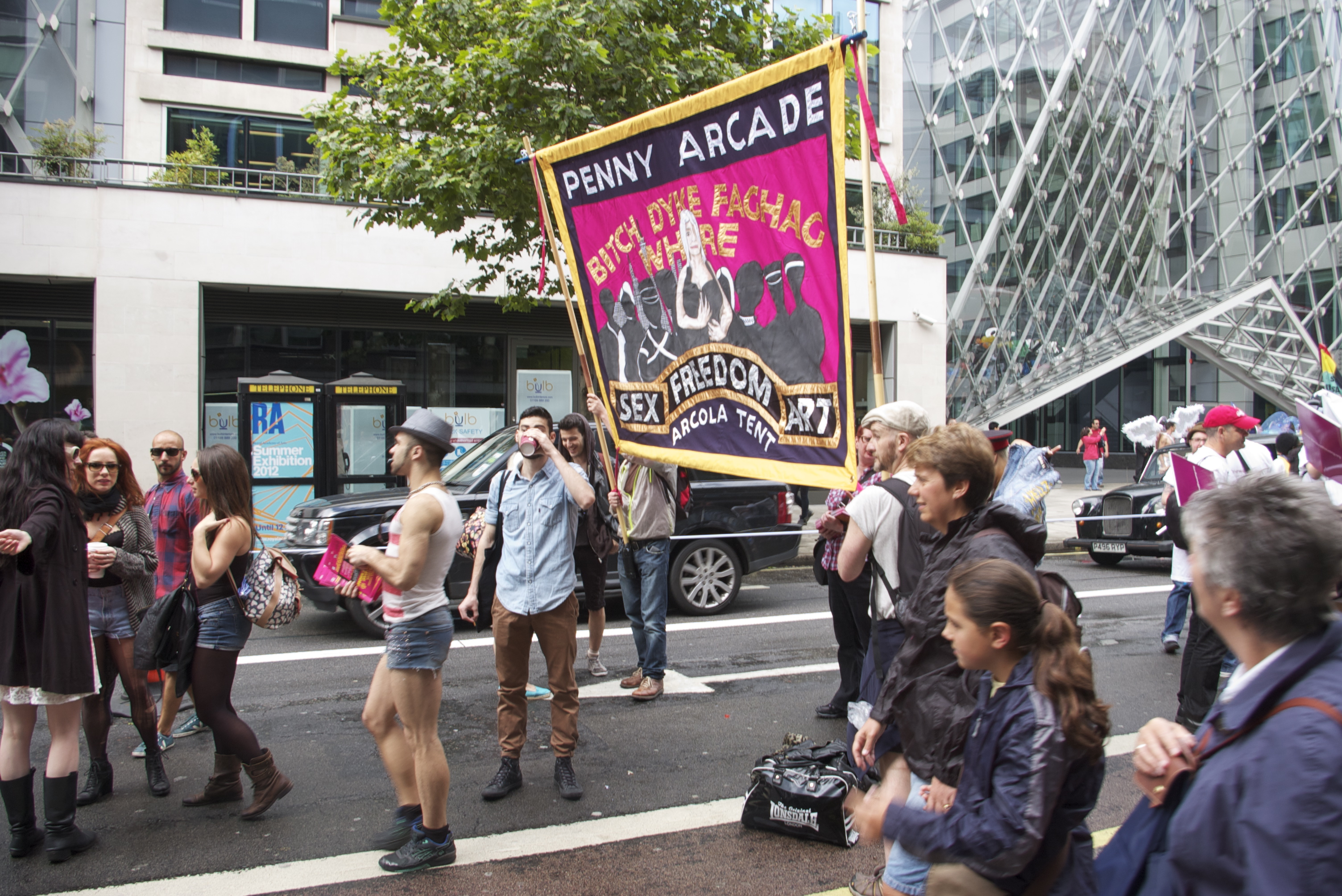
A banner for Arcade's show Bitch! Dyke! Faghag! Whore! at WorldPride London 2012

In January 2011 Arcade had an on-stage spat with performance artist Ann Liv Young while she was hosting an evening of performances and Young refused to respect the artists who were waiting to take their turn on stage . In 2012 she took up residence at London's Arcola Theatre for a 22 performance run of her show Bitch! Dyke! Faghag! Whore!.

In 2013 Arcade starred along with Mink Stole in a revival of Tennessee Williams one-act play, The Mutilated. The production was directed by Cosmin Chivu with music by Jesse Selengut, and previewed at the eighth annual Provincetown Tennessee Williams Theater Festival in Massachusetts, prior to its six-week run in New York at the New Ohio Theatre in the West Village where it was nominated for a Drama League Award as Best Revival.

== Personal life ==
Arcade has been married three times. Her third marriage in 1998 was to singer-writer-composer Chris Rael, with whom she collaborated artistically. The couple lived together until January 2008. Arcade is bisexual.

== Works ==
Selected works include:

- While You Were Out (1985)
- Invisible on the Streets (1986)
- Bid for the Big Time (1988)
- Bringing It All Back Home (1988)
- Operating Under The Influence (1988)
- Quiet Night for Sid and Nancy at the Chelsea Hotel (1989)
- True Stories (1989)
- Based on A True Story (1990)
- The Beginning of the End of the World (1990)
- La Miseria (1991)
- State of Grace (1991)
- Bitch Dyke Faghag Whore 1990
- Sunday Tea With Quentin Crisp (1993)
- Love Sex and Sanity (1995)
- An Evening With Penny Arcade And Quentin Crisp (1995)
- Sisi Sings The Blues (1996)
- Bad Reputation (1997)
- The Last Will And Testament Of Quentin Crisp (1999)
- Lady Fest (2000)
- Virtual Arcade Cyber Performance And Interview Show (2000)
- Alive and Kicking (2001)
- Sex. Politics. Reality. (2001)
- New York Values (2002)
- Penny Arcade At The Warhol Museum (2002)
- Artist Survivor (2002)
- Working My Way Down (2003)
- Rebellion Cabaret (2004)
- Escape From The East Village Ny Ny (2004)
- Penny Arcade in Motion (2005)
- Old Queen (2009)
- Longing Lasts Longer (2011)
- The Etiquette Of Death (2012)
- The Girl Who Knew Too Much (2013)
