= Kaminey =

2009 Indian film by Vishal Bhardwaj

- Theatrical release poster
- Directed by: Vishal Bhardwaj
- Written by: Vishal Bhardwaj
- Screenplay by: Sabrina Dhawan; Abhishek Chaubey; Supratik Sen
- Story by: Cajetan Boy; Vishal Bhardwaj
- Based on: An idea by Cajetan Boy
- Produced by: Ronnie Screwvala
- Starring: Shahid Kapoor; Priyanka Chopra; Amole Gupte
- Cinematography: Tassaduq Hussain
- Visual effects by: Govardhan Vigraham; Vinay Singh Chauphal
- Edited by: Meghna Manchanda Sen; A. Sreekar Prasad
- Music by: Vishal Bhardwaj
- Production company: UTV Motion Pictures
- Distributed by: UTV Motion Pictures
- Release date: 14 August 2009
- Running time: 134 minutes
- Country: India
- Language: Hindi
- Budget: ₹35 crore
- Box office: ₹71.56 crore

Kaminey (transl. Scoundrels) is a 2009 Indian Hindi-language crime action film written and directed by Vishal Bhardwaj and produced by Ronnie Screwvala under UTV Motion Pictures, featuring Shahid Kapoor in a dual role, alongside Priyanka Chopra and Amole Gupte in the lead roles. Set against the backdrop of the Mumbai underworld, Kaminey follows a rivalry between a pair of twins, one with a lisp and the other with a stutter, over the course of a single day.

Bhardwaj bought the original script of Kaminey for US$4,000 from Kenyan writer Cajetan Boy—whom he had mentored at a scriptwriting workshop in Uganda, later collaborating with screenwriters Sabrina Dhawan, Abhishek Chaubey and Supratik Sen to modify it. Kaminey was released on 14 August 2009 and became a box-office success worldwide, grossing over ₹710 million (US$7.4 million) against a production and marketing budget of ₹350 million (US$3.6 million). The film's soundtrack album, composed by Bhardwaj, also became a commercial success, with the song "Dhan Te Nan" topping the charts on various platforms.

Kaminey received widespread critical acclaim, with several critics and media publications placing it at number one on their listings of "Best film of the year". Since its release, the film has attained cult status. It received several awards and nominations at ceremonies across India. At the 55th Filmfare Awards, it received ten nominations, including Best Film, Best Director, Best Actor, Best Actress, and Best Supporting Actor; it won the award for Best Special Effects. At the 57th National Film Awards, Kaminey won two awards — Best Audiography for Subash Sahoo and Special Jury Award for its editing by A. Sreekar Prasad.

== Plot ==
Charlie Sharma and Sanjay "Guddu" Kumar Sharma are twins who were raised in Mumbai. Charlie lisps while Guddu stutters. Charlie likes to take shortcuts to fulfill his dream of becoming a bookmaker at the racecourse, where he works for three criminal brothers who fix races. He is closer to the youngest brother Mikhail than to Guddu, to whom he is hostile. A jockey deceives Charlie when he bets ₹100,000 (US$1,000) on a horse during a fixed race, losing all of his savings. Seeking revenge, Charlie locates the jockey in an upmarket city hotel.

At the same hotel, policemen Lobo and Lele kill three drug dealers and collect a guitar case containing cocaine, which they must deliver to drug lord Tashi. Charlie and his men invade the jockey's hotel room and take all his possessions. The ensuing chase leads to the hotel car park, where Lobo and Lele are placing the guitar case in their van. Charlie and his men seize the van to escape from the jockey's men and realise they have stolen a police vehicle, whilst also discovering the cocaine, which Charlie steals to sell. The policemen, upon returning, discover that the cocaine is missing and set out to find Charlie.

Meanwhile, Guddu's lover, Sweety, sister of the politician Sunil Shekhar Bhope, reveals that she is pregnant with Guddu's child and expresses her wish to marry Guddu. They marry later that night. Bhope hears about his sister's actions and sends his men to apprehend the lovers. Bhope's men gatecrash Guddu's wedding and beat him, only to realise that he is a migrant from Uttar Pradesh. This enrages Bhope, who orders his men to kill Guddu and return Sweety to his house so he can arrange a marriage for her. Sweety fights off her brother's henchmen and escapes with Guddu.

Charlie tells Mikhail about the cocaine, who is delighted. When Charlie returns to retrieve the case, Bhope and his men are waiting inside the van. One of Bhope's men recognises Guddu as Charlie's twin, and Bhope demands that Charlie reveal Guddu's whereabouts. An inebriated Mikhail interrupts their conversation and is killed by Bhope.

On the way to the airport, Guddu realises that Sweety has faked her stutter. At a petrol station, Lobo and Lele notice the pair. Mistaking Guddu for Charlie, they arrest him. They assault Guddu, refusing to believe that he is Charlie's twin brother until Guddu's mobile phone rings; the caller is revealed to be Bhope. Lobo and Lele agree to exchange Charlie for Guddu and Sweety on a train. The policemen take Guddu and Sweety to Bhope's house, where Bhope reveals that a local builder will pay him ₹50 million (US$520,000) to marry Sweety to the builder's son. Guddu bargains with Bhope—if he retrieves the cocaine-filled guitar case for Bhope, he will get Sweety. Bhope sends his henchmen with Guddu to retrieve the guitar case from Charlie's house.

The policemen assault Charlie, who refuses to negotiate, realising that the policemen are in as much trouble as himself. Charlie outwits the policemen, takes them hostage, and negotiates with Tashi to exchange the guitar case for ₹1 million (US$10,000). Charlie sends the policemen to deliver the details to Tashi and returns to his house to retrieve the cocaine. At Charlie's house, Guddu arrives with Bhope's men. Sweety hears about Bhope's plans to kill Guddu and shoots at the members of her household. Guddu finds the case and fights Charlie, who lets Guddu go. Guddu takes the cocaine to the police, who bug him. Guddu arrives at Bhope's house at the same time as Tashi and his gang, with Charlie as their hostage. Bhope and Tashi negotiate to trade the drugs, but Charlie snatches the guitar case and threatens to destroy it if Guddu and Sweety are not released. The lovers escape as the police arrive, leading to a shooting spree in which the cocaine is destroyed. Charlie's bosses arrive to avenge Mikhail's death but are killed along with Bhope, Tashi, and their henchmen. Charlie is shot and wounded.

Sweety gives birth to Guddu's twins, and Charlie opens a bookmaking counter at the racecourse. Charlie is engaged to Sophia, a woman earlier featured in his dream.

== Cast ==
- Shahid Kapoor in a dual role as
  - Charlie Sharma
  - Sanjay Kumar "Guddu" Sharma
- Priyanka Chopra as Sweety Shekhar Bhope
- Amole Gupte as Sunil Shekhar Bhope a.k.a. Bhope Bhau, Sweety's brother
- Deb Mukherjee as Mujeeb
- Shiv Kumar Subramaniam as Lobo
- Chandan Roy Sanyal as Mikhail
- Shashank Shende as Ganesh
- Tenzing Nima as Tashi
- Hrishikesh Joshi as Lele
- Rajatava Dutta as Shumon
- Harish Khanna as Afghani
- Carlos Paca as Cajetan
- Eric Santos as Ragos
- Vishal Bhonsle as Steve
- Satyajit Sharma as Francis
- Bugs Bhargava as Marfatia
- Adil Hussain as Flight Purser
- Neha Shitole as Sweety's friend
- Aakash Dahiya

== Production ==
=== Development ===
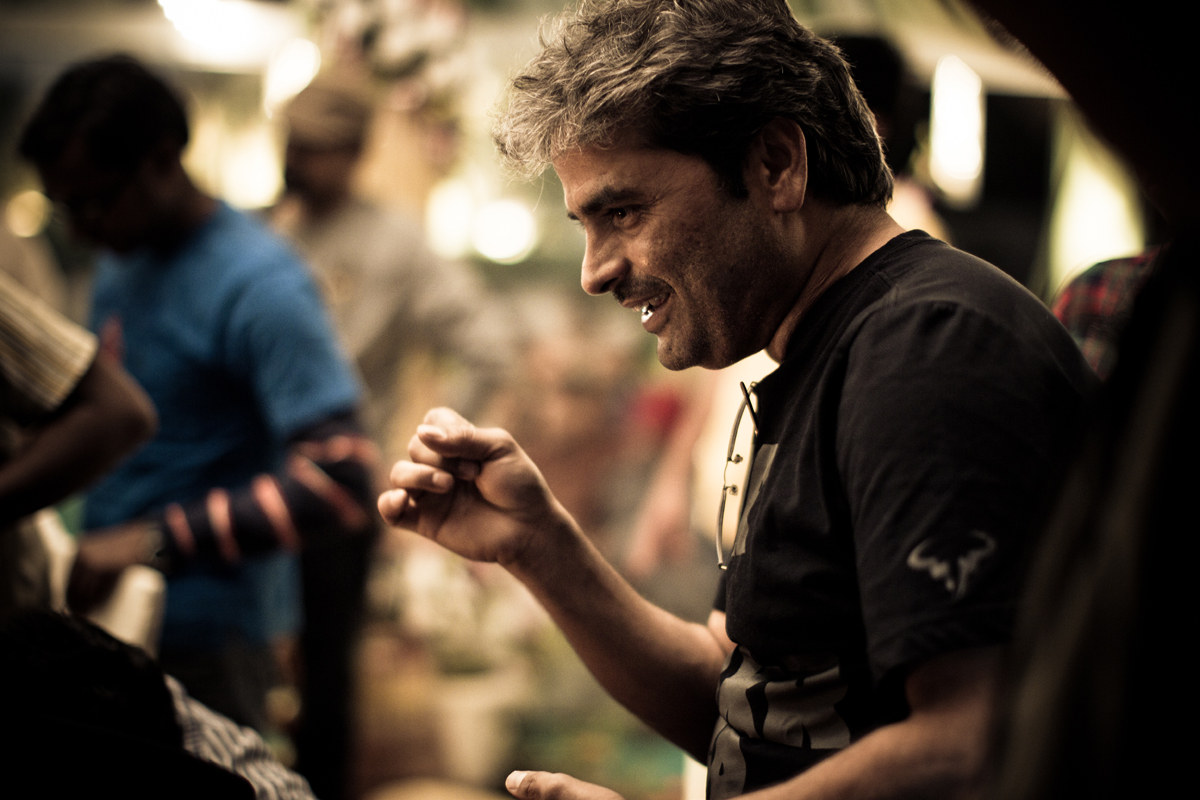
Bhardwaj added some Bollywood elements and a dark and serious side into the script he brought from Kenyan writer Cajetan Boy

During a scriptwriting workshop held by Mira Nair in 2005, Cajetan Boy, a Kenyan writer from Nairobi, showed Vishal Bhardwaj a script about twin brothers from the city's slums and the events that occur in their lives during a 24-hour period. Bhardwaj liked Boy's approach to the script; Nair and Bhardwaj discussed it and thought it was a typical Bollywood masala film. Boy sent Bhardwaj another draft of his script. Three years later, Bhardwaj asked Boy to sell him the idea, and he later bought the script for US$4,000. Bhardwaj revisited the idea and added some Bollywood elements and a dark, serious side to the script. He worked on the original idea with writers Sabrina Dhawan, Abhishek Chaubey and Supratik Sen. He included Dhawan in writing the screenplay as he thought she would give it a "solid structure". Bhardwaj said that during the writing of the screenplay, most of the original ideas were changed and the climax was "Indianized". His re-worked version now included one brother with a stammer and the other with a lisp. Bhardwaj said that despite the complicated structure, Kaminey is "anything but arty" and could not alienate audiences in any part of India, and that it is a simple story but with a complicated structure. Dhawan said that the film's script was complex and has multiple stories which required excessive writing and rewriting to make each character sound distinct.

The media showed concern over the film's title, deeming it "odd", and some people were shocked because of the title, which can be translated into English as "mean". However, the makers said that is not a negative term and is actually a term of endearment. According to Bhardwaj, the idea for the title came from a scene from Gulzar's Ijaazat (1987), in which the lead actor (Naseeruddin Shah) refers to the actress in a loving manner; it was the first time that he heard the word used that way. Bhardwaj told Rediff, "when the script of this film was written, it was like discovering your own mean side. The format of the film is of a caper and all the characters in this film, excluding one, has an agenda. So I thought it was an apt title for the film".

=== Casting ===
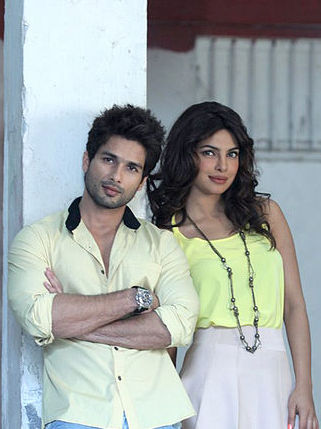
Shahid Kapoor and Priyanka Chopra were cast in the lead roles

Shahid Kapoor was cast in the film's lead role. Several media outlets reported that Bhardwaj considered many actors before casting Kapoor in the role, which he refused. Bhardwaj refuted the claims, saying, "There is a huge difference between discussing and narrating and offering someone a film and I would like to clear up the rumour by saying that Kaminey was never offered to anyone else and so no one rejected it." Kapoor said that he accepted the role after reading the script. Priyanka Chopra was cast to play Sweety, the lead female role. She initially turned down the role, saying she felt it was a boys' film and her eight-scene part did not seem good enough. However, Bhardwaj persuaded her to accept the role.

The idea for casting the screenwriter Amole Gupte came from the casting director Honey Terhan. Gupte said that when he received a call from Trehan, he thought it was a joke. He stated, "A man named Honey introduced himself as Vishal Bhardwaj's casting director and offered me a very important role. I banged the phone down not believing a word of what he said". However, after meeting Bhradwaj and hearing a script reading, he loved the story and accepted the offer. The actors Chandan Roy Sanyal, Shiv Subramnayam, Hrishikesh Joshi, Rajatava Dutta and Deb Mukherjee were cast in supporting roles. For the role of drug dealer Tashi, Bhardwaj chose his friend Tenzing Nima—a tour operator in Mussoorie—saying he had the character and attitude he wanted, and a weird sense of humour.

=== Characters ===
Bhardwaj instructed the film's entire cast and crew to watch caper classics such as Lock, Stock and Two Smoking Barrels (1998), Snatch (2000), Pulp Fiction (1994) and True Romance (1993) to study the nuances and become familiar with the genre. Shahid Kapoor played both Charlie and Guddu, twin brothers with speech impediments; Charlie has a lisp and Guddu stammers. The producers did not want them to look like caricatures, so Kapoor prepared for both roles by meeting and interacting with speech therapists and people with these impediments. According to Kapoor, the producers wanted to find out about the medical reasons for the impediments and their mental effects. They met specialists and thoroughly researched stammering and lisping. Kapoor said that each role had its own challenges. Charlie's physique was very different from Kapoor's and it took him nearly a year to change the look of his body. He found changing from one character to the other difficult.

Chopra described her character Sweety as "feisty and vivacious". She said, "Sweety is very busy, and does not have time to take care of her looks and apply make up. Her only aim in life is to bunk her lectures and visit her boyfriend's college or stay in his hotel, and eventually marry him." Chopra described both her character and herself as being "outspoken and fun-loving" as well as honest and unable to "hide something that is wrong". She said she had a different cultural background to Sweety, and found it challenging to convincingly portray a Maharashtrian Marathi girl. She had to adopt body language and a Maharashtrian accent to suit the character. She learnt the Marathi Language to make the character as authentic as possible, which she found difficult. Chopra said: "I am speaking a lot of Marathi in the film. It was difficult for me because it's a difficult language and I am not good at Marathi. But I think it's my luck that through Kaminey I got to learn one more language."

Gupte described his character as mercurial and found playing him a physical delight. Gupte said his character keeps the frame unpredictable and that it provided him with a foil to express rage and anguish. He worked a lot on his characterisation and tried to bring in his own references from European and Japanese cinema. Chandan Roy Sanyal described his character Mikhail as provocative, mad, wicked and humorous. Subramnayam and Joshi, who played Lobo and Lele respectively, described their characters as the most corrupt policemen in their department at the Anti-Narcotics Bureau. They said that to prepare for the roles they followed the script and Bhardwaj's instructions to get the characters right. Mukherjee prepared for his role as Mujeeb by reading the script and understanding the characters and discussing it with Bhardwaj. Dutta, who played Shumon—a Bengali criminal involved in fixing horse races and arms dealing—said that he did not have much time to prepare for his role because he was given the script after he arrived in Mumbai, where Bhardwaj briefed him.

=== Filming ===
Principal photography commenced in mid-2008, and the film was mostly shot in Mumbai. During a late night shoot for a scene in Pune, Chopra received minor injuries. Chopra was supposed to ride a motorcycle with Kapoor seated on the pillion seat. Both fell off the motorcycle as it skidded on mud. Kapoor was unhurt but Chopra received scratch marks and bruises. It was reported that Kapoor suffered from several injuries while shooting. During filming, Chopra became hoarse because she had to scream her lines; an essential part of her role as an "extremely vocal Maharashtrian girl." Some important railway sequences were shot at Wadi Bunder Yard near Sandhurst Road. Kapoor found filming for both of his characters at nearly the same time very difficult; he would shoot them on alternate days.

== Themes and influences ==
According to the Hindustan Times, Kaminey "is the first attempt to deal with reality in a mature, matter of fact manner." Unlike other Hindi films, in which the female lead is Sita, the protagonist is Rama and the antagonist is Ravana, the characters in Kaminey are nuanced humans in "layered and complex" situations. Namrata Joshi from Outlook wrote that Kaminey reflects Bhardwaj's "enduring fascination for underdogs, characters on the margins of society and the morally compromised". Bhardwaj told Rediff.com that the film deals with "themes that affect our lives directly", and "is a reminder that we all have a dark side, and often we are not fully aware of that side". Rakesh Bedi from The Economic Times wrote, "Bhardwaj presents the two warring brothers with speech defects. In today's world of logorrhea, communication is fraught with many dangers: misunderstandings, paranoias, recriminations, conflicts. Everyone speaks but no one understands. Bhardwaj gave the twins verbal impediments to show that the world has now been so hardwired to convoluted and calamitous communication that it needs silence or a speech defect to hash things out." He continued, "[w]ith some glitches, Bhardwaj has almost re-birthed the Hindi film". The film also explores sex and sexuality, which according to Bedi were explored in a "radically different and refreshing" way, and the director "daringly takes it a step further". When Sweety becomes pregnant, the couple "decide to carry the pregnancy to term after a bit of hesitation. So she literally pushes her man into marriage. (Had Bhardwaj abjured marriage, it would have been a complete break but the nuptials were essential to the drama of the film.)" The Daily Beast said that "for aficionados of the Hindi-language genre, Kaminey is a revolutionary manifesto. It takes classic Bollywood tropes—estranged brothers, a case of mistaken identity, high drama approaching slapstick comedy—and presents them with Hollywood-style realism instead of Bollywood's wink-nudge mix of melodrama and posturing.

Bhardwaj has been influenced by many directors—including Manmohan Desai, Subhash Ghai, Quentin Tarantino and Francis Ford Coppola—and combines these influences in his work. Rakesh Bedi wrote that "Bhardwaj keeps displaying his vision throughout the film". Reviewers have compared the film's multi-plot narrative to those of several films by Tarantino, Guy Ritchie and the Coen Brothers. Reviewers said that the film mostly belongs to the level of Pulp Fiction; Shubhra Gupta of The Indian Express called it "Bollywood's first all-the-way-out-to-there pulp fiction". Bedi wrote, "there's Buñuel in the Bengali dons, there's Kurosawa ... in that surreal train car in which Charlie lives, there's Ray in money-floating dreams that Charlie has". Keshav Chaturvedi of the Hindustan Times compared the apocalyptical gang war in the climax to Apocalypse Now (1979). He said, "Bhardwaj just demolishes the cliches of Bollywood. In ripping apart the stereotype, he gives us a prototype: a Bollywood that deals with alienation, ... angst, ... and atrocity." A review in The Times of India said that the film's climax reaches the level of Reservoir Dogs, and described it as "absolutely riveting stuff, with the camera going on a hitherto unexplored journey in Indian cinema."

== Soundtrack ==
Vishal Bhardwaj composed the music soundtrack for Kaminey and Gulzar wrote the lyrics. The album contains five original songs, two remixes and one theme song; it was released on 6 July 2009. The song "Dhan Te Nan" is a rehashed version of a song originally composed by Vishal Bhardwaj for an episode of the Zee TV series Gubbare. The soundtrack album was commercially successful after its release, especially "Dhan Te Nan", which topped the charts across various platforms.

== Marketing and release ==
The teaser poster of Kaminey was received positively by critics. The trailer, which introduces four characters; one lisping, one stuttering, a woman yelling about having raped a man and one jeering at the lisper, received positive reviews. Critics kept their expectations high due to Bhardwaj's previous films, and said the trailer was like a comic book which introduces the characters of Kapoor and Chopra differently. The theatrical trailers and the music generated interest for the film. The film's marketing also involved public appearances by Chopra and Kapoor.

The makers of the film were disappointed by the Censor Board for Film Certification's decision to grant the film an "A" certificate—meant for viewers 18 years or older—instead of a "U/A" certificate that they had expected. Bhardwaj said, "It was an injustice to us. There is no abusive language used in the film and the violence is of 'comic book kind'." The Censor Board asked him to replace dialogue which mentioned the city of Pilibhit—which they said was a sensitive constituency—with a fictitious city name. He replaced Pilibhit with Barabanki." The film was subject to some controversies. A First Information Report was filed by Jagannath Sena Sangathan at a police station in Puri against the film for allegedly denigrating Lord Jagannath. According to them, a scene in which the text "Apna Hath Jagannath" is seen in a toilet on a semi-clad model had hurt religious sentiments. The objectionable portion of the scene was removed from the prints released in the state of Orissa. A complaint supported by a caste group backed by a Samajwadi Party MP about the use of the name of a community "teli" in the song "Dhan Te Nan"—which was considered derogatory to the Teli community—was filed with the Ministry of Information and Broadcasting. The Censor Board reacted to the complaint, insisting on the replacement of the word, which was later replaced with "Dilli".

Kaminey was scheduled to release on 5 June 2009. However, the release was postponed because of problems between the producers and multiplexes in India. The film was released on 14 August 2009 on 1,200 screens worldwide. Because of the 2009 flu pandemic, the film was not released in the Maharashtra region—including Mumbai and Pune—because the multiplexes in these cities were closed by the Maharashtra government for three days as part of precautionary measures against swine flu. Moser Baer Home Videos released Kaminey on DVD in October 2009 across all regions in a two-disc pack complying with the NTSC format. One disc contains the film and additional content including a "making of the film" documentary, the original beginning and deleted scenes, while the other contains a random free film. VCD and Blu-ray versions were released at the same time. Bollywood Hungama critic Joginder Tuteja rated the DVD 4 out of 5, praising the bonus features and the packaging. Airtel Digital TV premièred the film on its Pay Per View service on 12 September 2009. The satellite rights for Kaminey were syndicated between Star India & Viacom 18 before being internalized by the former in 2020, and a world television première of the film was broadcast on Colors on 28 February 2010. The film is also available on Netflix.

Indiagames also released a maze mobile video game based on the film.

== Critical reception ==
Kaminey received widespread critical acclaim from critics who praised many aspects of the film. On the review aggregator website Rotten Tomatoes, 100% of 5 critics' reviews are positive, with an average rating of 7.5/10.

Raja Sen of Rediff.com rated the film 4.5 out of 5 and wrote, "Kaminey is startlingly clever, an innovative film with genuine surprises. A kind of film whose success we ought all pray for because it'll prove smart cinema works." The Indian Express gave a rating of 4 out of 5, calling it "Bollywood's first all-the-way-out-to-there pulp fiction". Rajeev Masand of CNN-IBN gave the film 4 stars out of 5, called it a "must watch" and wrote, "[i]t's an unpredictable crime drama that combines violence and dark humor in a manner that's reminiscent of the films of Quentin Tarantino, Guy Ritchie and the Coen Brothers. And yet Kaminey is so original and inventive in the manner in which it takes Bollywood's favorite formula—twin brothers—and turns it on its head." He praised the writing—which he said was the film's real strength, the non-linear screenplay and the dialogue, and wrote that the film has "the best performance you will see by an ensemble cast in a long time". Nikhat Kazmi from The Times of India rated the film 4 out of 5, saying that it was "Bollywood's first film which is full of brains, brawn and belligerence besides being a bravura attempt to rewrite the tried and tested idiom of desi movielore ... Tarantino, take a bow. Brave new Bollywood is here."

Anupama Chopra gave a rating of 4 out of 5 and wrote "Kaminey is the best Bollywood film I've seen this year. It's an audacious, original rollercoaster ride. Written and directed by Vishal Bharadwaj, Kaminey requires patience and attention but the pay off is more than worth it." Taran Adarsh of Bollywood Hungama rated the film 4 out of 5 and wrote "Kaminey is bold, stark, funny and unpredictable and is a film with an attitude. Like it or leave it, but you'd never be able to ignore it. Word from the wise: Go for this hatke (different) experience!" Zee News also rated the film 4 out of 5 and said, "Bhardwaj has once again delivered a powerful film that completely bowls you over with its splendid script, riveting narrative and stellar performances by lead pair—Shahid and Priyanka [who] have a cracking on-screen chemistry that certainly reminds you of yesteryears [sic] on-screen couples." The review also said, "Kaminey is an engrossing flick that does not let you move from your seat!" Kaveree Bamzai of India Today rated the film 4 out of 5 and said it "is dark, melodramatic, poetic and ultimately operatic". He also said, "Its lyrics are the blow-up-your-brains-out kind ... and its music, composed by the multi-talented Bharadwaj is perfectly in sync with a narrative that doesn't pause for breath." Namrata Joshi from Outlook gave a rating of 4 out 5 and called Kaminey "a strikingly anarchic, unusually energetic, quirky and frenetic film". Sudhish Kamath of The Hindu gave the film 4 stars and wrote, "Kaminey takes the post-postmodern noir genre to a whole new level, to a sophistication the Indian audience isn't used to. Watch it at least twice to fully appreciate this masterpiece." Writing for Variety, critic Joe Leydon described the film as a "tasty cinematic masala that is energetically entertaining, if not consistently coherent".

== Box office ==
Kaminey was successful throughout India, with occupancy around 90% across multiplexes. The film was successful across most single screens, and collected ₹170 million (US$1.8 million) in India during the opening weekend. In its first week of release, the film collected ₹250 million (US$2.6 million) in India. Because of the delayed release in Maharashtra, it lost about ₹50 million (US$520,000). However, the film profited in Mumbai after its release in Maharashtra on Monday and during its run, and it had earned ₹410 million (US$4.3 million) within four weeks. Kaminey earned ₹710 million (US$7.4 million) worldwide; Box Office India declared it a hit and it became a commercial success.

Overseas, the film grossed around ₹82.50 million (US$860,000) in North America, the UAE, the UK and Australia during the opening weekend. The film's most successful overseas market was North America. It collected around ₹120 million (US$1.2 million) in 10 days from international markets and proved to be a commercial success outside India.

== Legacy ==
Film director Shekhar Kapur praised the film, saying, "Kaminey catapults Indian Cinema in modernity beyond Tarantino". He said that Kaminey would be able to compete with any film in the world in terms of its design, performances, inherent narratives, editing and pace. Filmmaker Karan Johar labelled it a cult film, describing it as "edgy ... cult and geniusely performed and executed! Go get a shot of new age cinema and cinematic bravery!" The film became the most widely debated and dissected Bollywood film after Rakeysh Omprakash Mehra's 2006 film Rang De Basanti. Rajeev Masand, and Rediff.com rated it as the best film of the year. Raja Sen said the performances were among the best performances of 2009. Gupte, Roy Sanyal and Kapoor were placed at numbers six, three and one respectively as the best performances of 2009 by a Hindi actor by Rediff.

Rediff.com placed Chopra at number one as the best performance of 2009 by a Hindi actress. Chopra said, "[y]ou don't get to work in a fantastic movie like Kaminey and play someone like Sweety every day". Hindi Film News said Kaminey was the best Bollywood film of the decade. It ranked Shahid Kapoor's performance at number four for the finest performance by a Bollywood actor for the decade, and in a public poll the song "Dhan Te Nan" was voted the thirteenth-best Bollywood song of the decade. Rediff.com also included the film on its list of "Top 25 Hindi Action Films of all Time". Since its release, the film has gained a cult following and is regarded as a cult film of the 2000s decade of Bollywood.

== Awards and nominations ==
Kaminey has received several awards and nominations in categories ranging from recognition of the film itself, to its cinematography, direction, screenplay, music and cast performances. At the 55th Filmfare Awards, the film received ten nominations—more than any other film—for awards including Best Film, Best Director, Best Actor, Best Actress, and Best Supporting Actor. However, it won only the award for Best Special Effects. The film also won two National Film Awards; Best Audiography for Subash Sahoo and Special Jury Award for Film Editing at the 57th National Film Awards for A. Sreekar Prasad. It received eleven nominations at the 5th Apsara Film & Television Producers Guild Award and won two, one of which was Best Actress for Chopra.
