= Margo Howard-Howard =

Margo Howard-Howard (1935 – September 3, 1988) was a drag queen who wrote memoirs titled I Was a White Slave in Harlem shortly before her death. With a preface by Quentin Crisp, the memoirs, co-written with Abbe Michaels, describe Howard-Howard's privileged childhood in Singapore under her given name of "Robert Hesse," her rape aboard a British Navy vessel escaping the Japanese at the start of World War II, and lifestyle as a drag queen and prostitute in the 1950s and 1960s in Manhattan. In these years, she supported a drug habit through prostitution, theft, and the exploitation of a wealthy but mentally ill old woman. She claimed to have had encounters with James Dean, the Duke and Duchess of Windsor, and Truman Capote during this time as well. In 1964, she met Leroy "Nicky" Barnes, the most prolific heroin dealer in New York City, and claims to have been "kept" by him, not leaving her apartment in the Lenox Terrace co-op in Harlem for four years.

Howard-Howard claimed to have ultimately escaped Barnes and recovered from her heroin addiction with the help of a methadone program run by the Handmaids of Mary convent on West 124th Street. Thereafter she achieved some kind of prominence with a cabaret act and tributes to Mary Stuart. In her post-Harlem years, she wrote she met Judy Garland, Martha Raye, Andy Warhol, Jackie Curtis, Brooke Astor, Tallulah Bankhead, Madonna, and Queen Elizabeth II, and others.

Reviewing these memoirs in 1988, the New York Times wrote: "[Her] life was a breathless walk on the wild side. Stories were for embellishing, rules for breaking and people either fools or toys - or, less often, mythical figures of the sort that Howard-Howard, the grand drag queen, manifestly considered [herself] to be. For decades, until [her] death in September, [she] breezed through a slick New York scene of transvestites and tricksters." There is apparently a movie being developed based on Howard-Howard's memoirs.

== Truth or Fiction? ==
Howard-Howard is known primarily though these memoirs, and no evidence supports most of her stories. Though the memoirs contain some photographs, none date to earlier than 1988 or validate any of the remarkable episodes she claims from her past. Her publisher added an afterword to I Was a White Slave in Harlem stating that "much, if not most" of the stories in the autobiography were false. The afterword specifically disavows Howard-Howard's stories about her childhood.

In 1988 and 1989, the New York Times published articles stating that Susana Ventura (the performance artist Penny Arcade) had created a character named Margo Howard-Howard, a 50-year-old drag queen with a scandalous past, for her performances. The Times specifically refers to the Howard-Howard character as "patently unbelievable." A later article in the Times specifies that Arcade's monologue was "based on real Lower East Side residents," and Howard-Howard did receive an obituary in The Village Voice.

Arcade has based performances on other real people, such as Andrea "Whips" Feldman.

Note: The Village Voice states Howard-Howard was born in 1937; in her autobiography, she claims 1935.
