= Aftab Seth =

Indian diplomat

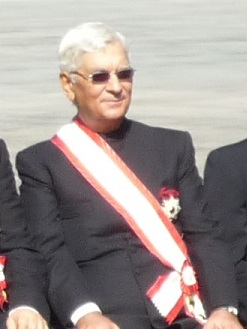
- 2015 at Chōwaden Reception Hall
- Born: 17 September 1943 (age 83); Patna, Bihar, British India (present-day Bihar, India)
- Education: The Doon School; St. Stephen's College, Delhi University; Oxford University; American College of Greece
- Occupations: Indian Foreign Service officer, diplomat, professor
- Known for: Former Indian ambassador to Greece, Vietnam, Japan and Micronesia
- Spouse: Nilima Seth
- Children: 2
- Parents: T. N. Seth (father); Venetia Seth (mother)
- Relatives: Roshan Seth (brother)

Aftab Seth (born 17 September 1943) is a retired Indian diplomat who served as ambassador of India to Greece, Vietnam and Japan. He is the brother of British-Indian actor Roshan Seth.

== Education ==
Seth completed his schooling from The Doon School. He then went on to pursue B.A. (Honours) in History from St. Stephen's College, University of Delhi, where he topped the university with First Class honours. He then received a Rhodes Scholarship to read History and Politics, Constitutional History at Christ Church, Oxford. He then proceeded to do a Doctorate in Law from American College of Greece.

== Outline of career ==
- 1968 - Joined the Foreign Service
- 1970-72 - Served as Third Secretary and Second Secretary, Embassy of India, Tokyo, Private Secretary to the Ambassador
- 1979-83 - Consul General of India, Hamburg, with commercial consular. Jurisdiction over Bremen Bremerhaven Schleswig-Holstein and lower Saxony
- 1983-85 - Deputy Chief of Mission, Embassy of India, Jakarta
- 1985-88 - Consul General of India, Karachi, Pakistan
- 1988-92 - Spokesman of the Foreign Office and Joint Secretary in-charge of External Publicity, New Delhi, India
- 1992-96 - Ambassador of India, Athens, Greece
- 1997-2000 - Ambassador of India, Hanoi, Vietnam
- 2000-03 - Ambassador of India, Tokyo, Japan; also concurrently accredited as Ambassador of India to Federal States of Micronesia
- 2004-06 - Professor and Director of Global Security Research Institute, Keio University
- 2006 – present Chairman of the International Advisory Committee, Keio University; Present Chairman & CEO, India Global Link Co., Ltd.; chairman, Japan-India Partnership Forum; Professor of Global Security Research Institute, Keio University; Visiting Professor, Indian Institute of Technology Bombay

He is also on the advisory board of World Development Forum, an upcoming forum that aims to bring together citizens' groups, development organizations, businesses and governments, to a common platform to produce, evidence-based politically actionable guidance and unlock greater value, through human enterprise.

He is also one of the advisory board members of Gyankriti, a chain of affordable preschool and daycare centers founded by Indian Institute of Technology Bombay alumni.

== Honours ==
- Grand Cordon of the Order of the Rising Sun (2015)

== See also ==
- Syed Akbaruddin
