= Pepita Seth =

British-born Indian writer and photographer

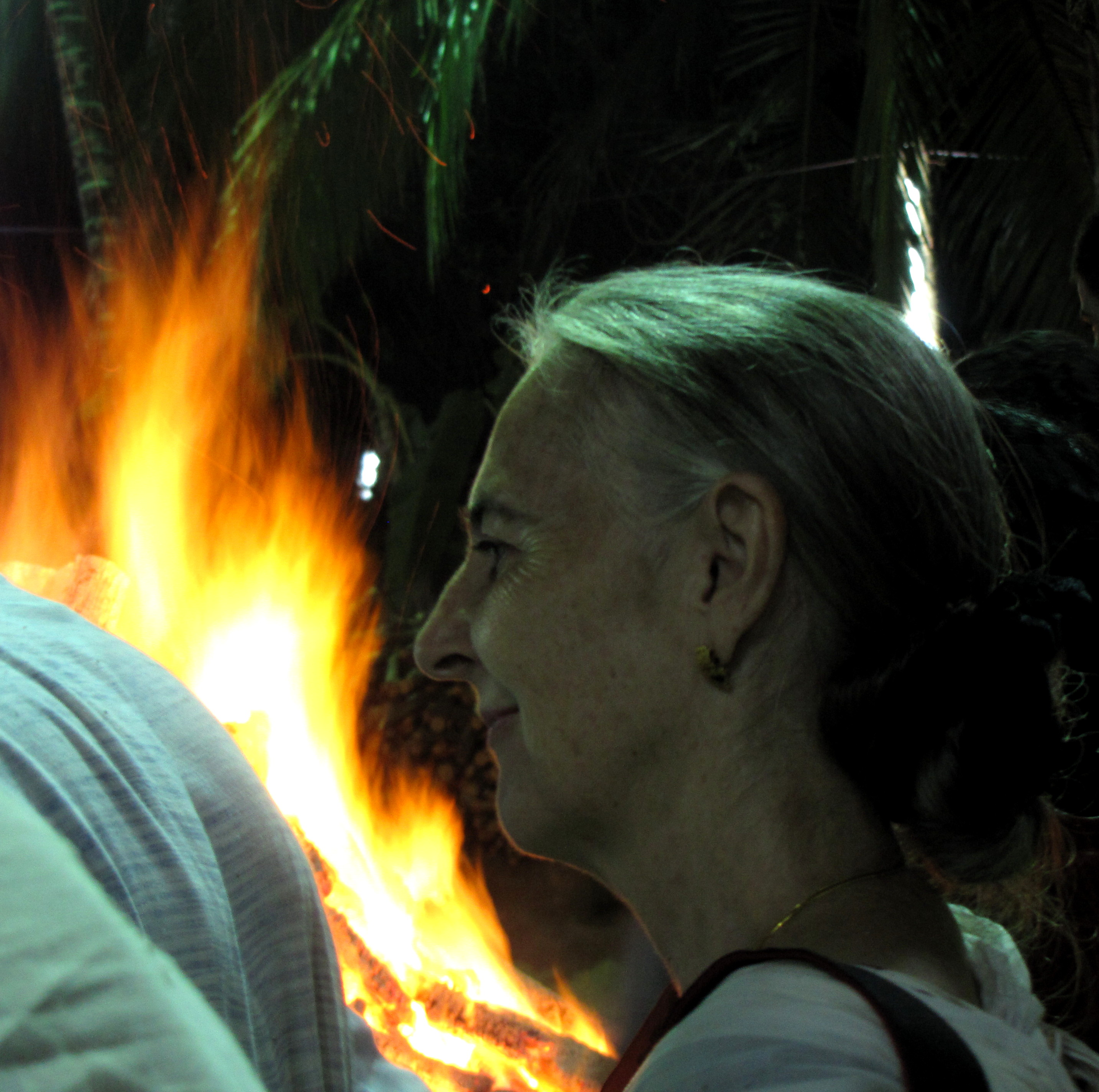
- Born: Pepita Christian Ramsay-Fairfax; 3 August 1942 (age 84); Suffolk, England
- Citizenship: United Kingdom (until 2026); India (since 2026)
- Occupations: Writer; photographer; film editor
- Spouses: Thom Noble (m. 1976, divorced); Roshan Seth (m. 1986; div. 2004)
- Awards: Padma Shri (2012)

Pepita Seth (née Ramsay-Fairfax; born 3 August 1942) is a British-born Indian writer and photographer. Her photography features the temple arts and rituals of Kerala and the captive elephant, Guruvayur Keshavan. The Government of India honoured her, in 2012, with the Padma Shri, the fourth highest civilian award, for her services to the field of art and culture.

== Biography ==
Pepita Seth was born as Pepita Christian Ramsay-Fairfax on 3 August 1942, the daughter of Victor Ramsay-Fairfax, a British Navy officer, and Christian Geraldine Mary Irby, in Suffolk, East of England. Pepita's maternal great-grandfather, Leonard Howard Lloyd Irby was a soldier who served in the army in the British India.

She, choosing a career in films, studied film editing and got opportunities to work under film directors like Ted Kotcheff and Stanley Donen. She was married to British film editor Thom Noble in 1976 but got divorced later. She worked as assistant editor with Noble on many films.

Pepita Seth was married to the Indian born British actor Roshan Seth in 1986, but was estranged from her husband in the late 80s. The couple formally divorced in 2004.

Pepita Seth lives in Guruvayur in Kerala. She applied for Indian citizenship in 2024 and received it officially on 7 February 2026.

== Career ==
"Oh, he was not an animal. I still remember the look he gave me as I positioned my camera… it was divine, as though he sensed that it was the beginning of my bond with the temple." says Pepitha Seth on Guruvayur Keshavan

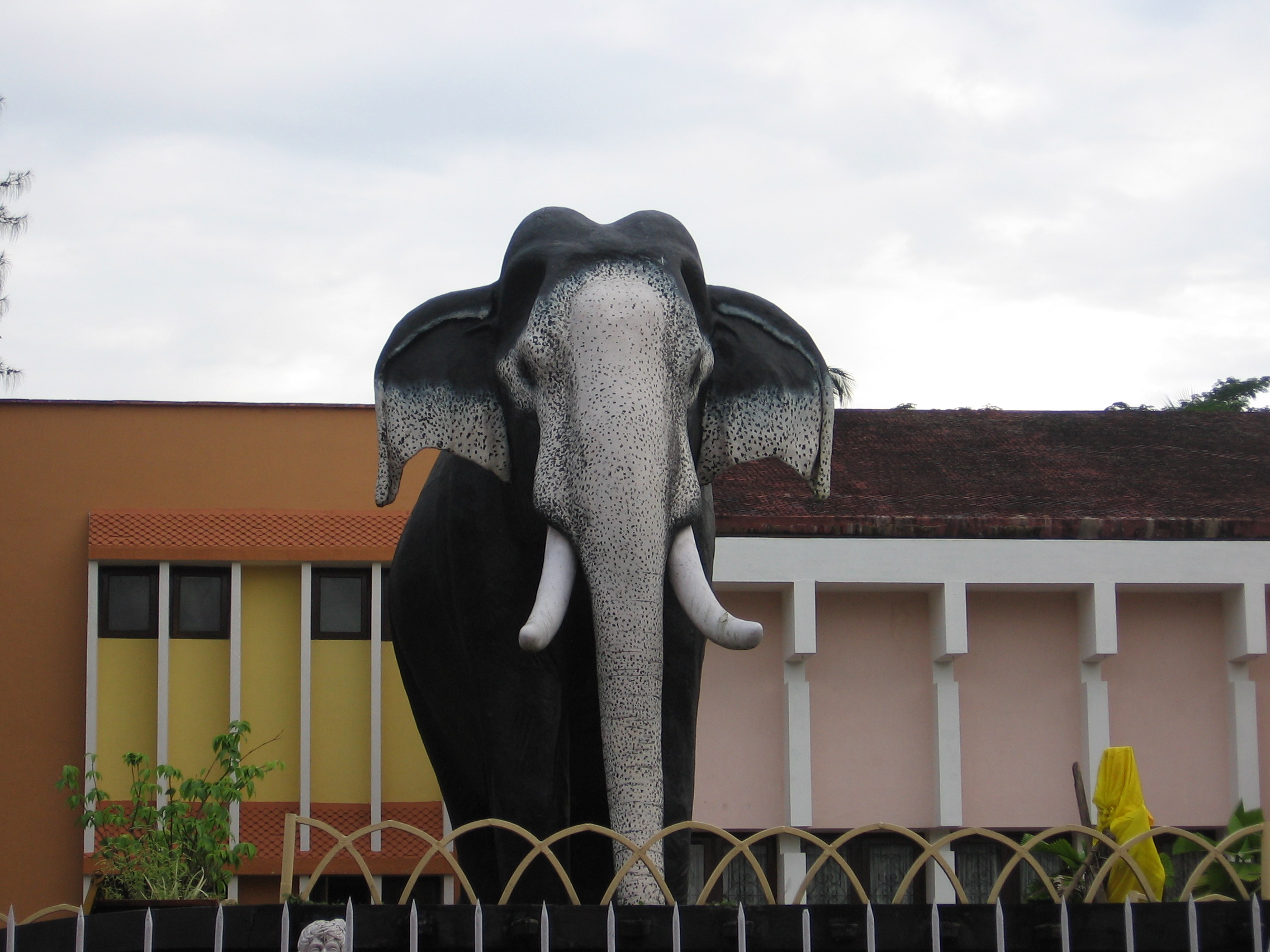
Guruvayoor Kesavan's Statue at Guruvayur.

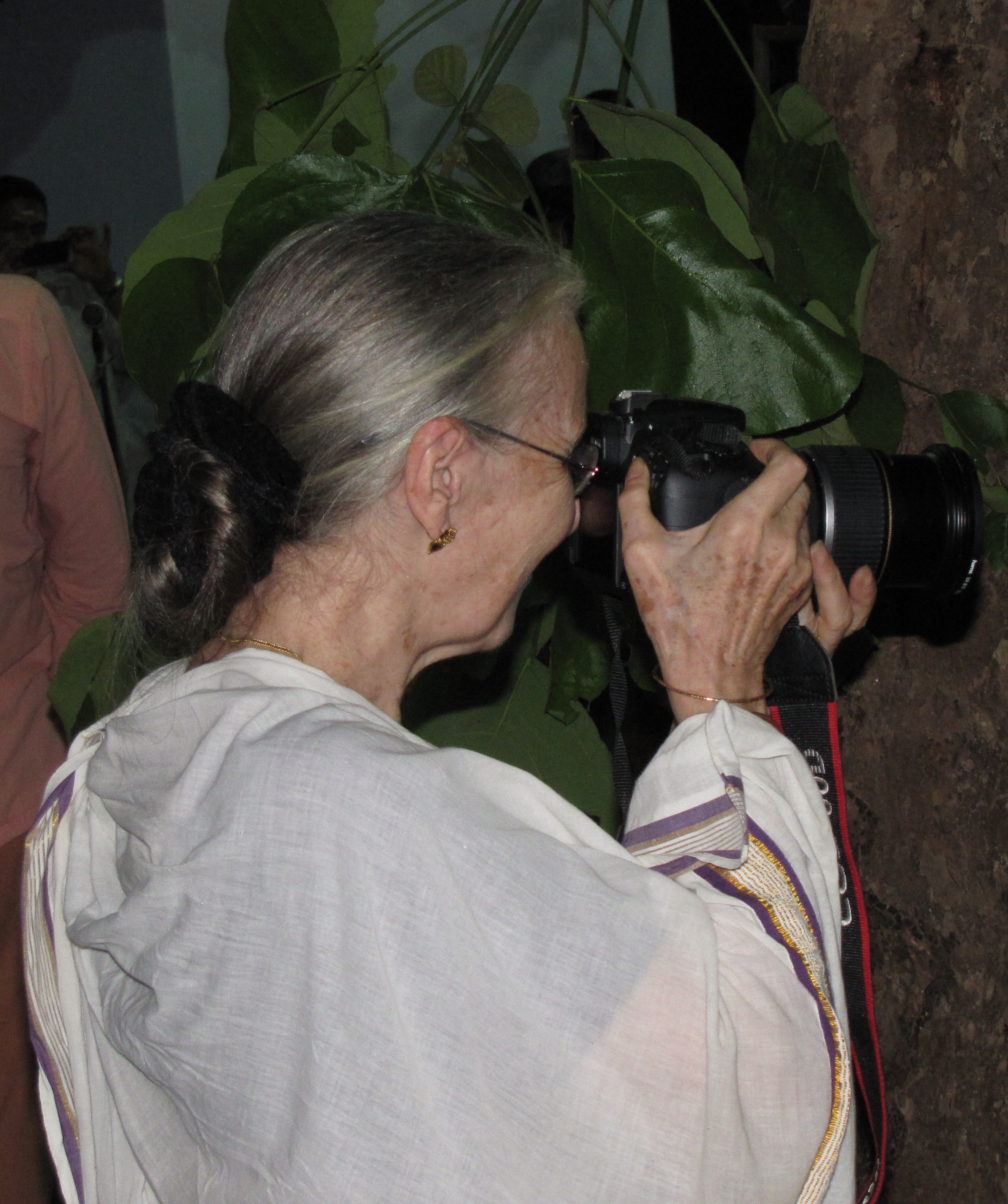
Pepita Seth taking photograph

Seth's life took a turn when she chanced upon the diary of her great-grandfather and decided to trace his trails with the British Army and document the movements and landed in Kolkata, in 1970.

The journey from Kolkata ended in Guruvayur where she became fascinated by the temple arts and rituals of Kerala. For the next nine years, she visited Kerala several times and, in 1979, she found a home and settled in Guruvayur. Though, at first, she was denied entry to the Guruvayur Temple, her persistence made the Guruvayur Devaswom Board to relent and she remains the only foreigner to be granted entry to the Temple.

Seth has extensively covered the rituals and temples of Kerala through her photographs. Her photographs of the elephant, Guruvayur Keshavan have been published in many magazines and journals including the New York Times and the Guardian. It is generally considered that Pepita's photographs of the rituals and temple arts of Kerala have helped promote the image of Kerala as a tourist destination.

== Books and articles ==
Seth's most recent book, In God's Mirror: The Theyyams of Malabar, documents the extraordinary 2,000 year-old ritual of worship, Theyyam, found only in India's south- western state of Kerala.

- Pepita Seth (2023). In God's Mirror: The Theyyams of Malabar. London: Scala. ISBN 9781785514111.

Seth has authored two books on Kerala, with accounts and photographs.

Heaven on Earth: The Universe of Kerala’s Guruvayur Temple is a research study on the Guruvayur Temple and the life, traditions, beliefs, myths and rituals associated with the place. It also covers the elephants fostered by the temple, especially Guruvayur Keshavan, widely regarded as the most famous of them all. The book follows an account with photographs style and has represented the information gathered from various sources, including the priests at the temple. The book is regarded as the first such attempt on the Guruvayur Temple. It consists of 17 chapters and 215 images and covers the history of the 5000-year-old idol, made out of black bismuth, of the temple, and the rituals and poojas, in detail.

- Pepita Seth (16 February 2013). Heaven on Earth: The Universe of Kerala's Guruvayur Temple. Kerala: Niyogi Books. ISBN 9789381523278.

The Divine Frenzy – Hindu Myths and Rituals of Kerala is an account of the spiritual and practical relationship of the people of Kerala with the deities. It attempts to depict, with text and images, the various rituals associated with Hinduism in Kerala.

- Pepita Seth (March 2001). The Divine Frenzy – Hindu Myths and Rituals of Kerala. United Kingdom: Westzone Publishing. p. 208. ISBN 978-1-903391-14-3.

Seth has written about Kerala, its rituals and its elephants. She is working on a book on Theyyam, a ritualistic dance form of Kerala.

- Pepita Seth (3 March 2014). "One Mirroring the Other". Web article. Lila Interactions. Archived from the original on 26 August 2014.

Seth has written a novel The Edge of Another World (2015) Published by The Speaking Tiger in English and to be translated to Malayalam and published by Poorna Publications.

== Awards and recognitions ==
In recognition of her services to the fields of art and culture, the Government of India, in 2012, bestowed the civilian award of Padma Shri on her.

== See also ==
- Guruvayur Temple
- Guruvayur Keshavan
- Theyyam
