= Roshan Seth =

British-Indian actor, writer and theatre director (born 1942)

Roshan Seth OBE
- Born: 2 April 1942 (age 84); Patna, Bihar, British India
- Education: London Academy of Music and Dramatic Art
- Occupations: Actor; writer; theatre director
- Years active: 1961–present
- Spouse: Pepita Seth (div. 2004)
- Relatives: Aftab Seth (brother)

Roshan Seth OBE (born 2 April 1942) is a British-Indian actor, writer and theatre director who has worked in the United Kingdom, United States and India. He began his acting career in the early 1960s in the UK, but left acting the following decade and moved to India to work as a journalist. In the 1980s, he rose to prominence for his comeback performance as Jawaharlal Nehru in Richard Attenborough's Academy Award-winning film Gandhi, which brought him a BAFTA Award nomination for Best Actor in a Supporting Role and reignited his interest in acting.

He has since appeared in numerous British and American feature films and television programmes, with roles ranging from Chattar Lal in Indiana Jones and the Temple of Doom, Amit Rao in A Passage to India, Papa Hussein in My Beautiful Laundrette, patriarch Jay in Mississippi Masala and Dhalsim in Street Fighter: The Movie. He won the Genie Award for Best Actor in a Leading Role for the Canadian film Such a Long Journey. Other projects he has appeared include Bharat Ek Khoj, Not Without My Daughter, The Buddha of Suburbia, Vertical Limit, Monsoon Wedding, Proof, Ek Tha Tiger, Indian Summers and Dumbo.

== Early life ==
Seth was born in Patna, Bihar on 2 April 1942 during the British Raj, to T. N. Seth and Venetia Seth. His father was a biochemistry professor at Patna Medical College. He was educated at The Doon School, then did graduate studies in history at St Stephen's College. There, he honed his theatrical skills at the Shakespeare Society, before moving to England for further training. He trained at the London Academy of Music and Dramatic Art in 1965 and started working in British television and repertory theatre.

== Career ==
Seth first appeared in Peter Brook's production of A Midsummer Night's Dream, which toured in 1972. Seth entered feature films in Richard Lester's Juggernaut (1974). However, subsequent filmmakers only wanted Seth for limited ethnic roles, so that his career stalled.

Discouraged, Seth abandoned acting and returned to India in 1977, where he worked as a journalist and editor of the quarterly journal published by the India International Centre, Delhi. He took leave from this job after Richard Attenborough asked Seth to play Jawaharlal Nehru in Gandhi (1982). Seth was nominated for the BAFTA Award for Best Actor in a Supporting Role for his performance in the film. Seth subsequently also played Jawaharlal Nehru in Bharat Ek Khoj, a 53-episode series on Doordarshan in 1988.

David Hare met Seth in Delhi in 1982, and asked him to play author Victor Mehta in Hare's biographical play A Map of the World. Seth left his editing job and returned to acting. A Map of the World toured for several years in Australia, London, and New York. After the release of the multi-award-winning movie Gandhi (1982), Seth was much in demand, and when A Map of the World's Broadway run finished, his movie career took off. His work in 1984 included major roles in Indiana Jones and the Temple of Doom and David Lean's A Passage to India. Following that he played a lead in My Beautiful Laundrette (1985), and he played Pancks in Little Dorrit (1988).

Seth's film credits in the 1990s included roles in Not Without My Daughter (1991), Mississippi Masala (1991), Street Fighter (1994), and Harish Saluja's The Journey (1997). In 1993, he played the role of Haroon Amir in the television miniseries The Buddha of Suburbia, for which he was nominated a Royal Television Society award for "Best Actor – Male". In 1995, he played the role of Baba in Flight, for which he won the "Best Actor" award at the Sochi International Film Festival. In 1998, he played the leading role of Gustad Noble in the film Such a Long Journey, for which he won the Genie Award for Best Performance by an Actor in a Leading Role.

In 2001, Seth appeared in Monsoon Wedding and he has continued working steadily in British and American films. In 2003 he played the lead in the American film Cosmopolitan, which was broadcast nationally on PBS. He also recently returned to mainstream Indian cinema with his role in the 2012 film, Ek Tha Tiger.

== Personal life ==
Seth was married to author Pepita Seth, but they separated in the late 1980s and divorced in 2004. His brother is the retired Indian diplomat Aftab Seth.

== Filmography ==
=== Film ===
List of performances by Roshan Seth in film
Year	Title	Role	Notes
1974	Juggernaut	Azad	
1982	Gandhi	Pandit Jawaharlal Nehru	Nominated- BAFTA Award for Best Actor in a Supporting Role
1984	Indiana Jones and the Temple of Doom	Chattar Lal	
1984	A Passage to India	Advocate Amrit Rao	
1985	My Beautiful Laundrette	Papa Hussein	
1987	Partition		
1988	Little Dorrit	Mr. Pancks	
1989	Slipstream	George Nyman	
1990	Mountains of the Moon	Ben Amir	
1990	1871	Lord Grafton	
1991	Not Without My Daughter	Houssein	
1991	Mississippi Masala	Jay	
1991	London Kills Me	Dr. Bubba	
1992	Electric Moon	Ranveer	
1994	Street Fighter	Dr. Dhalsim	
1995	Bideshi	Ajoy	Short film
1995	Solitaire for 2	Sandip Tamar	
1997	The Journey	Kishan Singh	
1998	Such a Long Journey	Gustad Noble	Genie Award for Best Performance by an Actor in a Leading Role
1998	Bombay Boys	Pesi Shroff	
1999	Secret of the Andes	Don Benito	
2000	Vertical Limit	Col. Amir Salim	
2001	Monsoon Wedding	Mohan Rai	
2001	Wings of Hope	Shekar Khanna	
2001	South West 9	Ravi	
2004	Spivs	Omar	
2004	Se sarà luce sarà bellissimo	Aldo Moro	
2005	Frozen	Noyen	
2005	Proof	Professor Bhandari	
2006	Kabul Express	Narrator (voice)	
2007	Broken Thread	Chief of Enquiry Commission	
2007	Guru	Thapar	
2007	Amal	Suresh Gupta	
2010	The Truth About Tigers	Narrator	Short film
2011	Trishna	Mr. Singh	
2012	Ek Tha Tiger	Professor Kidwai	
2013	Brahmin Bulls	Ashok Sharma	
2013	The Lovers	Sadhu	
2016	City of Tiny Lights	Farzad Akhtar	
2018	Boogie Man	Rupesh	
2019	Dumbo	Pramesh Singh	

=== Television ===
List of performances and appearances by Roshan Seth in television
Year	Title	Role	Notes
1964	Crossroads	Dr. Ahmed	
1966	Public Eye	Soondra	Episode: "Tell Me About the Crab"
1967	No Hiding Place	Kuldip Mahal	Episode: "The Game"
1967	Theatre 625	Vinay	Episode: "55 Columns"
1968–1969	The Wednesday Play	Ben Scalfe / Student	2 episodes
1969	Strange Report	Jamal	Episode: "Report 3424: Epidemic – A Most Curious Crime"
1971	The Doctors	Bingi Singh	Episode 1.88
1972	To Encourage the Others	Jazwon	Television film
1973	The Protectors	Persuer	Episode: "...With a Little Help From My Friends"
1975	Six Days of Justice	Mr. Wood	Episode: "Belonging"
1975	General Hospital	Dr. Narasjee	Episode: "The White Rajah"
1976	Play for Today	Dr. Milma	Episode: "The Peddler"
1976	Centre Play	Anil Roy	Episode: "Commonwealth Season: India – Apply, Apply, No Reply"
1976	Crown Court	Farooq Rana	Episode: "A Matter of Honour: Part 1"
1976	Gangsters		Episode: "Incident Four"
1987	The Happy Valley	Defense Solicitor	Television film
1987	Emmerdale	Howard	2 episodes
1988	First Born	Dr. Antony Graham	Episode 1.2
1988	Deadline	The Emir of Hawa	Television film
1988	Bharat Ek Khoj	Jawaharlal Nehru	Main cast; Series 1
1989	In Which Annie Gives It Those Ones	Y.D. Billimoria / Yamdoot	Television film
1992	Casualty	Sujit Pratkash	Episode: "Rates of Exchange"
1992	Screen One	Mr. Humphrey	Episode: "Running Late"
1992	Stalin	Lavrentiy Beria	Television film
1993	The Buddha of Suburbia	Haroon Amir	Television film Nominated- Royal Television Society Award for Best Actor
1994	Siren Spirits	Ajoy	Miniseries; 2 episodes
1996	The Bill	Ahmed Seth	Episode: "Blood Brothers"
1996	Dangerfield	Aslam Choudhury	Episode: "Treasure"
1996	Die Flughafenklinik	Dr. Tenshin Sharafi	Episode: "Fluchthilfe"; German TV series
1997	Turning World	Dr. Khan	3 episodes
1997	Flight	Baba	Television film
1997	Food for Ravens	Nehru	Television film
1997	Grandpa Chatterjee	Grandpa Chatterjee	Television film
1998	Iqbal	Ulla Khasi	Television film
1999	The Young Indiana Jones Chronicles	Sheikh Khamal	Episode: "Tales of Innocence"
2001	Holby City	Kushara Bandara	Episode: "Tip of the Iceberg"
2003	Spooks	Fazul Azzam	Episode: "Nest of Angels"
2003	Second Generation	Mohan	Television film
2003	Silent Witness	Afzal Khan	Episode: Answering Fire
2003	Cosmopolitan	Gopal	Television film
2004	Blue Murder	Jameel Khan	Episode: "Fragile Relations"
2005	The Man-Eating Leopard of Rudraprayag	Pundit	Television film
2007	The Last Days of the Raj	Jawaharlal Nehru	Television film
2008	The Cheetah Girls: One World	Uncle Kamal Bhatia	Television film
2015–2016	Indian Summers	Darius Dalal	Main cast; Series 1–2
2017	Diana and I	Uncle Zaheer	Television film
2019	Beecham House	Emperor Shah Alam	Main cast; Series 1
2021	Behind Her Eyes	Dr. Sharma	

== Selected theatre credits ==
- A Midsummer Night's Dream
- A Map of the World (Victor Mehta)
- King Lear (The Fool)
- The Millionairess (The Doctor)
- Amadeus (Antonio Salieri)

== See also ==
- List of British actors
