= Mollycuddle =

Alternative rock band from Minneapolis, active 1994-2000

- Origin: Minneapolis, Minnesota
- Genres: Indie-pop
- Years active: 1994–2000
- Labels: Guilt Ridden Pop
- Past members: Sara Aase (vocals and guitar); Tommy Kim (vocals and guitar); Guy Lawhead (bass); Judson Hildreth (drums)

Mollycuddle was an alternative rock band from Minneapolis, Minnesota active from 1994 to 2000.

A quartet composed of vocalist/guitarists Sara Aase and Tommy Kim, bassist Guy Lawhead, and drummer Judson Hildreth, the band was signed to Minneapolis label Guilt Ridden Pop. It released three albums, an EP and a split single with the band Pilot Light.

City Pages writer Peter Scholtes described their music as "cranky dreampop" and singled out for praise their "affecting" 1998 ode to Law & Order actress Jill Hennessy, "The Ballad of Jill Hennessy." Colin Helms of CMJ New Music Report called them "shamelessly retro indie-pop" and called the song "Miracles", from their 1999 EP The Best Place For You, "the ideal demonstration of the band's feisty guitar change and melody-driven bounce." A reviewer for the White Plains, New York Journal News called It's Not You, It's Me "occasionally yummy but ultimately underwhelming" but said that "Aase's candy-glazed voice is irresistibly listenable."

The band broke up in 2000 when Kim moved out of town to finish a Ph.D. dissertation.

== Discography ==
- Moment Resistance (1995, self-released)
- "King Me" b/w Pilot Light, "Chicken Bones" (split 7-inch single, 1998, Guilt Ridden Pop)
- Non-Fiction (1997, Guilt Ridden Pop)
- It's Not You, It's Me (1998, Guilt Ridden Pop)
- The Best Place For You (EP, 1999, Guilt Ridden Pop)
- Paved With Good Intentions (2000, Guilt Ridden Pop)
