= Jill Hennessy =

Canadian actress and musician

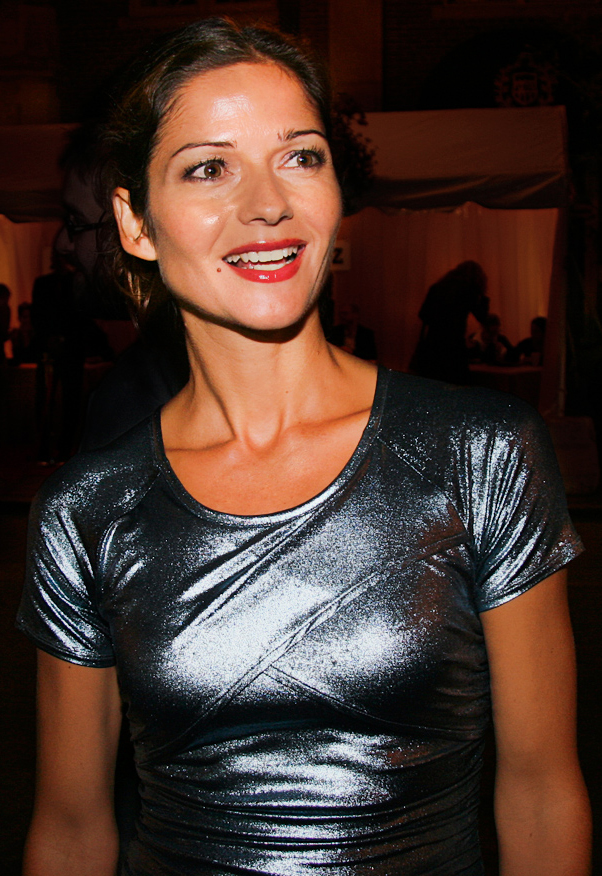
- Hennessy at the 2010 Toronto International Film Festival
- Born: November 25, 1968 (age 57); Edmonton, Alberta, Canada
- Occupations: Actress, musician
- Years active: 1988–present
- Spouse: Paolo Mastropietro (m. 2000)
- Children: 2

Jill Hennessy is a Canadian actress and musician. She is best known for her roles on the American television series Law & Order, on which she played prosecutor Claire Kincaid for three seasons, and Crossing Jordan, on which she played the lead character, Jordan Cavanaugh, for six seasons. She has also acted in films such as RoboCop 3 and Most Wanted, and the independent films Chutney Popcorn and The Acting Class, the latter of which she also wrote and co-directed.

As a singer-songwriter and guitarist, she has released two independent albums, Ghost in My Head and I Do. She remains active in the New York City music scene, completing a sold-out residency at City Vineyard in 2026.

== Early life ==
Hennessy was born November 25, 1968 in Edmonton, Alberta. Her father, John Hennessy, was a meat salesman and sales/marketing executive, a job that required considerable travel and resulted in frequent moves for the family. Her mother, Maxine, a secretary, left the family in 1982, leaving her daughter to be partially raised by her paternal grandmother, Eleanor, in Kitchener, Ontario. She has a younger brother, John Paul "J.P." Hennessy, Jr. and an identical twin sister, Jacqueline, who is a magazine writer and TV show host in Canada. Hennessy has Irish, French, Swedish and Italian ancestry on her father's side, and mostly Ukrainian Roma, as well as Austrian, ancestry on her mother's. She attended Stanley Park Senior Public School and graduated from Grand River Collegiate Institute, both in Kitchener, Ontario, and used to busk in the Toronto subway.

== Career ==
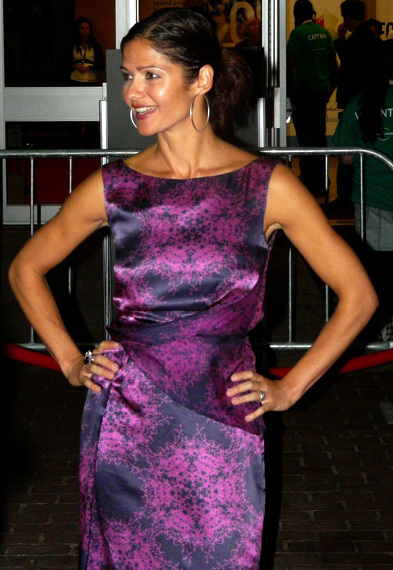
Hennessy in 2008

Hennessy and her sister, Jacqueline, made their acting debut playing twin call girls in 1988's Dead Ringers. She was short listed for the role of Dana Scully on The X-Files according to Gillian Anderson, the actress who was eventually chosen for the role.

She appeared on Broadway in the musical Buddy: The Buddy Holly Story in 1990.

In 1993, she appeared as Dr. Marie Lazarus in RoboCop 3.

Hennesey's big network breakthrough came in 1993, when Dick Wolf signed Hennessy as assistant district attorney Claire Kincaid in the NBC crime drama Law & Order. She played the role for three seasons, leaving the show in 1996.

In 1999, she appeared as Lisa in Chutney Popcorn. In 2000, Hennessy wrote, produced, and jointly directed (with Elizabeth Holder) an independent film mockumentary titled The Acting Class, which looked at the trials and tribulations of a dysfunctional acting class. The film co-starred her sister, Jacqueline, and included cameo appearances from a number of Hennessy's former Law & Order co-stars. She also appeared in the film Nuremberg, as Elsie Douglas.

In 2001, she portrayed Jackie Kennedy in the film Jackie, Ethel, Joan: The Women of Camelot. That same year she appeared in a small role as Commander Mulcahy in the Steven Seagal action film Exit Wounds. She received praise from critic Owen Gleiberman who said "With the right role, Hennessy might just be a movie star." In 2003, she made a cameo appearance in the film Abby Singer. From 2001 to 2007, she starred on the TV show Crossing Jordan as title character Jordan Cavanaugh. She also played the wife of Tim Allen's character in the 2007 film Wild Hogs. On June 9, 2007, she received a star on Canada's Walk of Fame.

During sessions in Austin, Texas, Hennessy recorded the album Ghost in My Head, which was released in June 2009. She performed as a guest of the Indigo Girls on a November 2009 episode of Mountain Stage, and was the focus of another episode of the show later the same month. She performed at Lilith Fair in 2010.

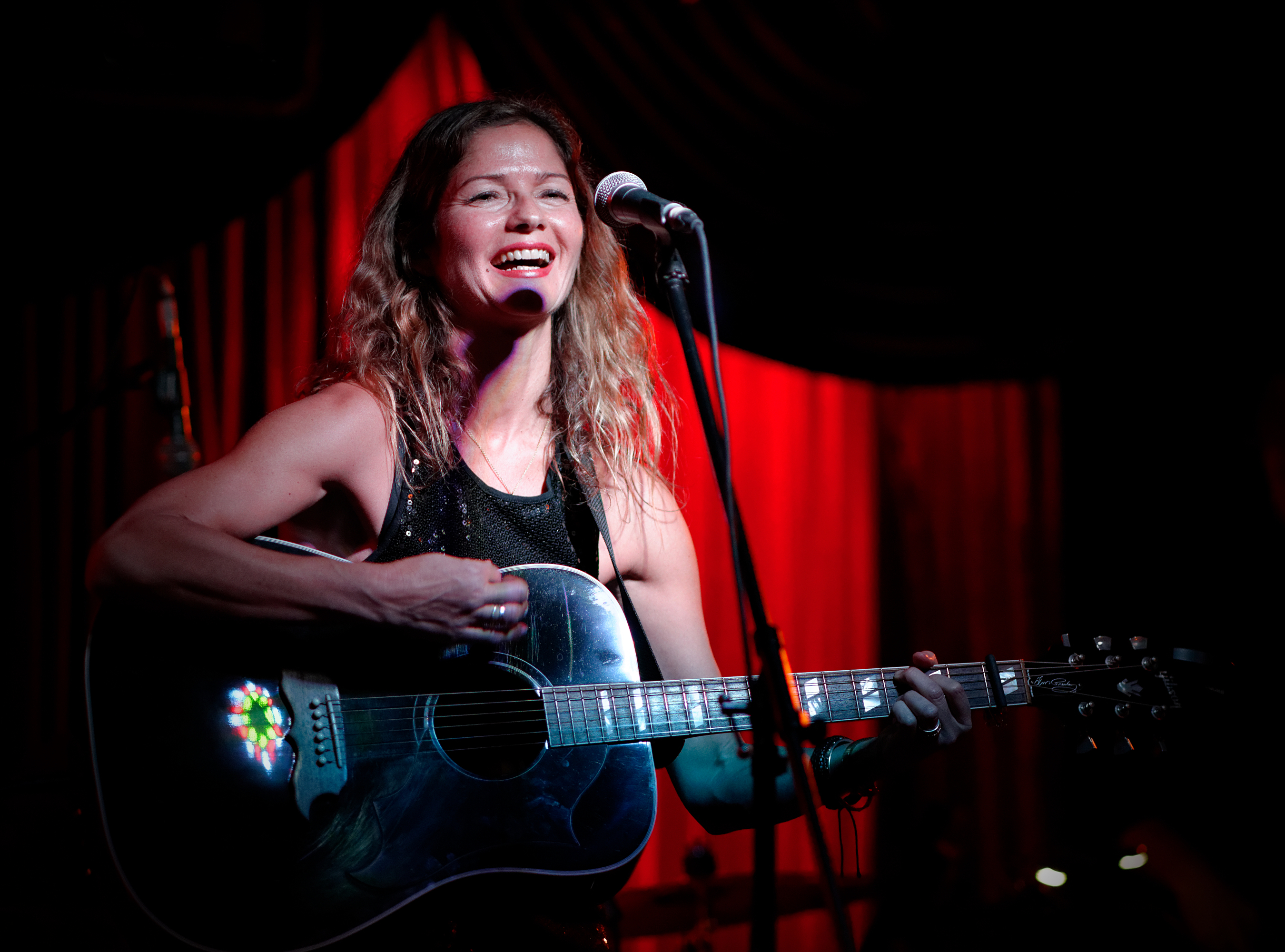
Hennessy performing in 2015

Hennessy starred in the independent crime thriller Small Town Murder Songs in 2010. She also appeared as a veterinarian in the HBO series Luck, and promoted Zaxby's "Zalads" in a pair of television commercials in 2012.

In 2015, Hennessy appeared in several episodes of Madam Secretary, and in October of that year, her second album, I Do, was released.

In 2018, she appeared on the Michael Weatherly series Bull as the mother of the deceased hacker character Cable McCrory. Also in 2018, she began the role of Senator Huntington on the series Yellowstone.

== Personal life ==
Hennessy is multilingual, and fluently speaks English, Italian, French, Spanish, and German. She plays the guitar and sings, and enjoys riding motorcycles with her husband, Paolo Mastropietro, whom she married in 2000. They had a second marriage ceremony in January 2001, which took place at New York City Hall with Mayor Rudy Giuliani officiating. Their first son, Marco, was born in 2003, and their second son, Gianni, was born in 2007.

== In popular culture ==
The Minneapolis-based band Mollycuddle wrote the song "The Ballad of Jill Hennessy" in honor of the actress. Hennessy was reportedly very pleased and offered to perform with the band on rhythm guitar.

== Filmography ==
=== Film ===
Jill Hennessy film credits
| Year | Title | Role | Notes |
|---|---|---|---|
| 1988 | Dead Ringers | Mimsy | |
| 1993 | RoboCop 3 | Dr. Marie Lazarus | |
| 1993 | Trip nach Tunis | Kathryn Darby | |
| 1994 | The Paper | Deanne White | |
| 1996 | I Shot Andy Warhol | Laura | |
| 1996 | Kiss & Tell | Interrogator Angela Pierce | |
| 1997 | A Smile Like Yours | Lindsay Hamilton | |
| 1997 | Most Wanted | Dr. Victoria Constantini | |
| 1998 | Weekend Getaway | Lily | Short |
| 1998 | Dead Broke | Kate | |
| 1999 | The Florentine | Brenda | |
| 1999 | Row Your Boat | Patti | |
| 1999 | Two Ninas | Mike the Bartender | |
| 1999 | Chutney Popcorn | Lisa | |
| 1999 | Molly | Susan Brookes | |
| 1999 | Komodo | Dr. Victoria Juno | |
| 2000 | The Acting Class | Amanda Smythe / Jill / Anonymous | |
| 2000 | Autumn in New York | Lynn McCale | |
| 2001 | Exit Wounds | Commander Annette Mulcahy | |
| 2002 | Pipe Dream | Marina Peck | |
| 2007 | Wild Hogs | Kelly Madsen | |
| 2007 | Game of Life | Brenda | |
| 2008 | Lymelife | Brenda Bartlett | |
| 2010 | Small Town Murder Songs | Rita | |
| 2011 | Roadie | Nikki Stevens | |
| 2012 | Dawn Rider | Alice | |
| 2013 | If I Had Wings | Sandy Taylor | |
| 2017 | Don't Sleep | Cindy Bradford | |
| 2019 | Crypto | Robin Whiting | |
| 2019 | Standing Up, Falling Down | Vanessa | |
| 2022 | The Road to Galena | Teresa Baird | |
| 2024 | Madame Web | NSA Agent | |

=== Television ===
Jill Hennessy television credits
| Year | Title | Role | Notes |
|---|---|---|---|
| 1987 | Not My Department | Twin Makeup Artist | Episode: "Let's Make Gold" |
| 1988 | War of the Worlds | Patty | Episode: "Goliath Is My Name" |
| 1989 | The Hitchhiker | Marla/Elisabeth | Episodes: "Striptease" & "Pawns" |
| 1989–1990 | Friday the 13th: The Series | Various | 4 episodes |
| 1990 | C.B.C.'s Magic Hour | Hooker | Episode: "The Prom" |
| 1990 | War of the Worlds | Scott | Episode: "Max" |
| 1990 | Counterstrike | Lex | Episode: "Dealbreaker" |
| 1992 | Flying Blind | Lauren Benjamin | Episode: "Crazy for You... and You" |
| 1993–1996 | Law & Order | Assistant District Attorney Claire Kincaid | Main role Nominated - Screen Actors Guild Award for Outstanding Performance by an Ensemble in a Drama Series (1995–1997) |
| 1996 | Homicide: Life on the Street | Assistant District Attorney Claire Kincaid | Episode: "For God and Country" |
| 2000 | Nuremberg | Elsie Douglas | Television movie Satellite Award for Best Actress – Miniseries or Television Film |
| 2001 | Jackie, Ethel, Joan: The Women of Camelot | Jackie Kennedy | Television movie Nominated - Satellite Award for Best Supporting Actress – Series, Miniseries or Television Film |
| 2001–2007 | Crossing Jordan | Dr. Jordan Cavanaugh | Main role Gracie Allen Award for Outstanding Lead Actress in a Drama Series |
| 2004–2006 | Las Vegas | Dr. Jordan Cavanaugh | 3 episodes |
| 2011–2012 | Luck | Jo | Main role |
| 2012 | Sunshine Sketches of a Little Town | Agnes Leacock | Television movie Nominated - Canadian Screen Award for Best Actress in a Miniseries or Television Film |
| 2013 | Jo | Sister Karyn | Main role |
| 2014 | The Good Wife | Rayna Hecht | 2 episodes |
| 2015 | Madam Secretary | Jane Fellows | Recurring role |
| 2017 | Shots Fired | Alicia Carr | Recurring role |
| 2017 | The Blacklist | Margot Rochet | Episode: "The Harem" |
| 2018 | Crawford | Cynthia | Main role |
| 2018 | Yellowstone | Senator Huntington | Episode: "Daybreak" |
| 2018 | Bull | Ellen | 2 episodes |
| 2019–2022 | City on a Hill | Jenny Rohr | Main role |
| 2023 | Accused | Lynn Harmon | Episode "Scott's Story" |
| 2026- | Hope Valley: 1874 | Hattie Quinn | Main role |
