= International Public Television Screening Conference =

International public television organization

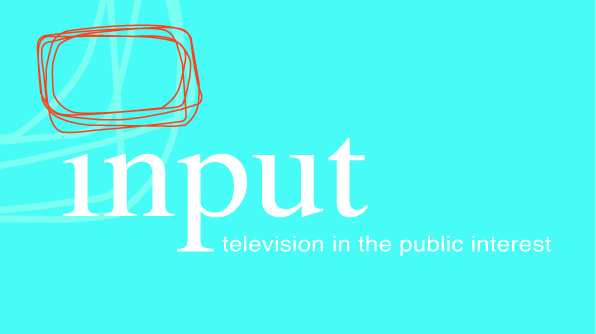
INPUT Official Logo

International Public Television Screening Conference (INPUT) is an international public television organization.

== History ==
Since 1977, INPUT annually holds an international television screening conference. Held in a different country each year, the conference encourages the development of public service television by screening and debating programs from around the world.

INPUT also organizes many other activities throughout the year in dozens of countries.

INPUT is a voluntary organization, supported by conference registration fees, public television organizations, individuals, and various institutions, agencies, and foundations. The idea for INPUT took shape during a seminar hosted by the Rockefeller Foundation in Bellagio, Italy in May 1977.

National Coordinators are responsible for submitting productions within a set quota to the international selection. At the international selection, a group of television professionals (called Shopstewards) make a selection of productions that are screened within the conference programme. The programmes are screened in themed sessions. The themed sessions consist of several productions of different genre's.

INPUT is supported by an International Advisory Board, consisting of public service broadcasters from around the world. The Associate Members of INPUT support the organisation of INPUT.

Since 2009, INPUT is headed by an International Assembly, consisting of individuals and organisations who pay an annual fee/registration for the conference, and have been to a set amount of INPUT Conferences in the past. The International Assembly oversees the work of the International Board - approx. 20 people from around the world. The International Board appoints the National Coordinators. The National Coordinators suggest Shopstewards to the Board.

== INPUT Archive at the Universitat Pompeu Fabra Library (Barcelona) ==
The INPUT Archive was created in 1994, as a result of the agreement signed on 20 May 1994 between UPF and INPUT. The Archive has a collection of the programs (in VHS, Betacam and DVD format) screened at the annual conferences of INPUT, and documents associated with the organization of these conferenciers. The Archive has a complete collection from 1994 onwards. The collection is not complete for previous conferences, although the Archive do try to get hold of the missing tapes. This documentary collection has been stored and available for consultation by those engaged in the study of television since 1994 at the Universitat Pompeu Fabra Library, at the Poblenou Campus Library.

There is also available a database including information about more than 3500 programs screened since 1978, first year of the INPUT conferences. This database is an online version of the information included in the printed catalogs of the annual conferences, usually known as "INPUT Bibles".

== See also ==
- Public television
- PBS
- AD-PUT (African Version of INPUT)
