= Monsoon Wedding =

2001 film by Mira Nair

- U.S. poster
- Directed by: Mira Nair
- Written by: Sabrina Dhawan
- Produced by: Caroline Baron; Mira Nair
- Starring: Naseeruddin Shah; Lillete Dubey; Shefali Shah; Vasundhara Das; Vijay Raaz; Tillotama Shome; Randeep Hooda; Rajat Kapoor; Jas Arora
- Cinematography: Declan Quinn
- Edited by: Allyson C. Johnson
- Music by: Mychael Danna
- Production companies: IFC Productions; Mirabai Films; Delhi Dot Com
- Distributed by: USA Films (United States); Océan Films (France); Prokino Filmverleih (Germany); Key Films (Italy); iDream Productions (India; through SPE Films India)
- Release dates: 30 August 2001 (Venice); 30 November 2001 (India)
- Running time: 113 minutes
- Countries: India; France; Germany; Italy; United States
- Languages: Hindi; English
- Budget: US$1.2 million
- Box office: US$30.8 million

Monsoon Wedding is a 2001 comedy-drama film directed by Mira Nair, written by Sabrina Dhawan, and starring Naseeruddin Shah, Lillete Dubey, Shefali Shah and Vasundhara Das. The story is set during a traditional Punjabi Hindu wedding in Delhi and revolves around the complex romantic entanglements of the characters.

Dhawan wrote the first draft of the screenplay in just one week while in the MFA film program at Columbia University. Although the film is set entirely in New Delhi, it was produced internationally between companies from India, the United States, Italy, France, and Germany.

Monsoon Wedding premiered in the Marché du Film section of the 2001 Cannes Film Festival and went on to win the Golden Lion at the Venice International Film Festival. The film also received a nomination for the Golden Globe Award for Best Foreign Language Film and grossed over $30 million internationally at the box office.

In 2017, IndieWire named Monsoon Wedding the 19th best romance of the 21st century. In 2023, a musical adaptation based on the film had its New York City premiere at St. Ann's Warehouse, directed by Mira Nair, with music by Vishal Bhardwaj, lyrics by Susan Birkenhead and Masi Asare, and book by Dhawan and Arpita Mukherjee.

== Plot ==
The film's central story deals with the organization of an enormous, chaotic, and expensive wedding that is due to take place in a modern Indian family. Lalit Verma and his wife Pimmi have arranged a marriage for their daughter Aditi to Hemant Rai. Hemant is the son of a family friend who lives in Texas, and Aditi has only known him for a few weeks. As so often happens in Indian culture, such a wedding means that, for one of the few times in each generation, the extended family comes together from all corners of the globe, bringing its emotional baggage along.

Lalit and Pimmi are helped with the main planning by Pimmi's sister Shashi and her husband C.L, who have arrived earlier from Oman. A few days before the engagement, Tej, Lalit's extremely wealthy brother-in-law, arrives from the U.S.. Tej is married to Lalit's sister and has helped the Verma family regain their financial footing after the Partition of India left them penniless many years ago. Tej offers to pay for Aditi's cousin, Ria Verma to attend university in the U.S., after the family consults him for advice. Ria and her mother live with the Verma family, who took them in after the death of Ria's father (Lalit's brother). Despite his generous offer, Ria stays away from Tej and is visibly uncomfortable in his presence.

Lalit begins experiencing difficulty in paying for the final, smaller aspects of the wedding and is embarrassed when he has to borrow money from friends and colleagues. Meanwhile, P.K. Dubey, the eccentric wedding planner, falls in love with Alice, the Vermas' soft-spoken Christian maid. Ria grows concerned after she witnesses what appears to be Tej grooming a younger relative, ten-year-old Aliya. Aditi's younger brother Varun plans an elaborate dance for the pre-wedding party with another cousin, Ayesha, but Lalit worries that his son is becoming too effeminate and plans to send him to boarding school. Meanwhile, Ayesha is mutually attracted to Pimmi's nephew studying in Australia, Rahul, a fact they attempt to hide from the family. Dubey's workers see Alice trying on Aditi's wedding jewellery, and the men accuse her of stealing. The incident causes her to become withdrawn from Dubey and he grows depressed.

A few days before the wedding, Aditi sleeps with an old lover, her married boss Vikram; and confesses this to Hemant. The incident only serves as a reminder to Aditi as to why she stopped seeing Vikram. Though he is initially angry, Hemant is glad for her honesty and is confident that they can put it behind them and be happy together. The workers apologise to Alice and she reconciles with Dubey. The night before the ceremony, Varun refuses to dance due to the comments made by his father, and Ayesha performs with the help of Rahul. Aditi and Hemant grow closer and they share a few intimate moments, which re-affirms their faith in the marriage. After a night of jokes, drama and dances, Ria catches Tej trying to take Aliya for a drive alone. Ria stops them from driving off and takes Aliya away from him, revealing to Lalit and others that Tej had molested her as a child. Lalit's sister does not believe her, attributing her accusations to her character and unmarried status. Emotionally distraught, Ria leaves.

The next day, Lalit pleads with Ria to return to the wedding, admitting that he can't possibly imagine what she has gone through but also saying that he can't disown Tej, since they are family. Ria is furious but agrees to return for the sake of Aditi. Hours before the wedding, however, Lalit changes his mind and tells his sister and Tej to leave the wedding and the family home. Tej's wife insists that Ria's accusation was a small matter but Lalit stands his ground, defending his niece.

The Monsoon rains begin as Aditi and Hemant are married in an elaborate wedding, while Dubey and Alice simultaneously wed in a simple ceremony, and later celebrate with the Vermas. Finally supported and starting to heal from her trauma, Ria freely enjoy the festivities.

== Cast ==
- Naseeruddin Shah as Lalit Verma
- Lillete Dubey as Pimmi Verma
- Shefali Shah as Ria Verma
- Vasundhara Das as Aditi Verma
- Vijay Raaz as Parabatlal Kanhaiyalal 'P.K.' Dubey
- Tillotama Shome as Alice
- Parvin Dabas as Hemant Rai
- Kulbhushan Kharbanda as C.L. Chadha
- Kamini Khanna as Shashi Chadha
- Rajat Kapoor as Tej Puri
- Randeep Hooda as Rahul Chadha
- Neha Dubey as Ayesha Verma
- Ishaan Nair as Varun Verma
- Roshan Seth as Mohan Rai
- Soni Razdan as Saroj Rai
- Jas Arora as Umang Chadha
- Natasha Rastogi as Sona Verma
- Ram Kapoor as Shelly
- Dibyendu Bhattacharya as Lottery
- Rajiv Gupta as Delhi Cop in Rain Scene

== Reception ==
Monsoon Wedding received widespread critical acclaim upon release.

On the review aggregator website Rotten Tomatoes, 95% of 128 critics' reviews were positive, with an average rating of 8/10. The website's consensus reads: "An insightful, energetic blend of Hollywood and Bollywood styles, Monsoon Wedding is a colorful, exuberant celebration of modern-day India, family, love, and life." Metacritic, which uses a weighted average, assigned the film a score of 77 out of 100, based on 36 critics, indicating "generally favorable" reviews.

Roger Ebert rated the film 3.5 stars out of 4, calling it "one of those joyous films that leaps over national boundaries and celebrates universal human nature." Sandi Chaitram of the BBC gave a positive review, praising Mira Nair's ability to create tense drama without stifling the film's overall feel-good nature. She also noted that the "somewhat cheesy" finale's confirmation of family love doesn't impede the film's charm. Brian Eggert of Deep Focus Review gave the film a perfect score of 4 out of 4, highlighting the film's rich storytelling and Nair's ability to create complex characters. He states, "Nair has crafted a variegated ensemble of characters. We care about them, as they live full and complicated lives."

Chuck Bowen of Slant Magazine praised Nair's direction, describing her as having "clear gifts as a director," with her most appealing traits being her "generosity and sense of texture." Derek Malcolm of The Guardian appreciated the film's exploration of tradition and modernity, saying, "There is a mixture of ancient and modern that holds the Verma family in its thrall. Nair looks at these contrasts with a skilled eye that's ironic but never mocking." Soham Gadre of The Spool described the film as "a warm-hearted ode to family and Indian culture," highlighting its balance between Bollywood traditions and modern sensibilities.

== Soundtrack ==
The soundtrack of Monsoon Wedding includes a qawwali by Nusrat Fateh Ali Khan, a ghazal by Farida Khanum, a Punjabi song by Sukhwinder Singh, an old Indian song by Rafi, a folk dance song. The film includes an Urdu ghazal, Aaj Jaane Ki Zid Na Karo (Don't Be So Stubborn About Leaving Today) sung by Pakistani artist Farida Khanum.

The song Aaj Mera Ji Karda is recreated by Indian musicians Tanishk Bagchi and Arjunna Harjaie for the film Lucknow Central (2017) starring Farhan Akhtar.

All music is composed by Mychael Danna (except where listed).

No.	Title	Music	Length
1.	"Feels Like Rain"		0:28
2.	"Kaavaan Kaavaan" (Performed by Sukhwinder Singh)	Sukhwinder Singh	5:11
3.	"Baraat"		2:13
4.	"Aaj Mausam Bada Beimann Hai ^{(*)} [Today The Weather Plays Tricks on Me]" (Performed by Mohammed Rafi)	Laxmikant–Pyarelal ^{(*)}	3:20
5.	"Your Good Name"		3:38
6.	"Delhi.com"		1:41
7.	"Fuse Box"		2:31
8.	"Mehndi / Madhorama Pencha" (Performed by Madan Bala Sindhu)		3:26
9.	"Banished"		0:52
10.	"Good Indian Girls"		3:41
11.	"Fabric / Aaja Savariya" (Performed by MIDIval Punditz)		3:01
12.	"Allah Hoo" (Performed by Nusrat Fateh Ali Khan)		4:39
13.	"Hold Me, I'm Falling"		2:57
14.	"Love and Marigolds"		2:45
15.	"Chunari Chunari ^{(**)}" (Performed by Abhijeet and Anuradha Sriram)	Anu Malik ^{(**)}	4:08
16.	"Aaja Nachle" (Performed by Bally Sagoo feat. Hans Raj Hans)	Bally Sagoo	3:40
17.	"Aaj Mera Jee Kardaa - (Zimpala remix)"		4:56
18.	"Fuse Box - Alex Kid's Dub Remix"		6:14
19.	"Fuse Box - Julio Black Remix"		3:03

- ^{(*)} Originally featured in the Hindi film Loafer (1973)
- ^{(**)} Originally featured in the Hindi film Biwi No.1 (1999)

== Accolades ==
Monsoon Wedding won the Golden Lion at the Venice Film Festival, making Mira Nair the second Indian (after Satyajit Ray for Aparajito) to receive this honour.

Award	Date of the ceremony	Category	Recipients	Result	Ref.
Venice Film Festival	29 August–8 September 2001	Golden Lion	Mira Nair	won	
Venice Film Festival	29 August–8 September 2001	Laterna Magica Prize	Mira Nair	won	
Awards Circuit Community Awards	4 January 2002	Best Foreign Language Film	Monsoon Wedding	nom	
Zee Cine Awards	11 January 2002	Best Actor in a Comic Role	Vijay Raaz	nom	
Zee Cine Awards	11 January 2002	Outstanding Contribution for International Cinema	Mira Nair	won	
Golden Globe Awards	20 January 2002	Best Foreign Language Film	Monsoon Wedding	nom	
British Academy Film Awards	24 February 2002	Best Film Not in the English Language	Monsoon Wedding	nom	
IIFA Awards	6 April 2002	Best Performance In A Comic Role	Ishaan Nair	nom	
AARP Movies for Grownups Awards	May–June 2002	Best Foreign Film	Monsoon Wedding	won	
American Choreography Awards	20 October 2002	Outstanding Achievement in Feature Film	Farah Khan	nom	
British Independent Film Awards	30 October 2002	Best International Independent Film	Monsoon Wedding	won	
Canberra International Film Festival	15–17 November 2002	Audience Award	Mira Nair (tied with Jean-Pierre Jeunet for Amélie)	won	
European Film Awards	1 December 2001	Screen International Award	Mira Nair	nom	
Online Film Critics Society	6 January 2003	Best Foreign Language Film	Monsoon Wedding	nom	
Critics' Choice Movie Awards	17 January 2003	Best Foreign Language Film	Monsoon Wedding	nom	
Satellite Awards	12 January 2003	Best Foreign Language Film	Monsoon Wedding	nom	
Chlotrudis Society for Independent Films	15 March 2003	Best Director	Mira Nair	nom	
Chlotrudis Society for Independent Films	15 March 2003	Best Cast	Monsoon Wedding	nom	
Independent Spirit Awards	4 March 2006	Producers Award	Monsoon Wedding	won	

== Home media ==
This film was released on DVD in 2002. In 2009, it was released on Blu-ray by The Criterion Collection.
