= The Acting Class =

- Directed by: Jill Hennessy; Elizabeth Holder
- Written by: Jill Hennessy
- Starring: Jody Booth; Jill Hennessy; Elizabeth Holder; Ken Murton; Jacqueline Hennessy; Will Arnett; Austin Pendleton
- Release date: 2000
- Country: United States
- Language: English

The Acting Class is a 2000 American independent film directed by and starring Jill Hennessy and Elizabeth Holder. The film's supporting cast includes many of Hennessy's former Law & Order castmates, including Chris Noth, Jerry Orbach, and Benjamin Bratt, and Alec Baldwin as himself.
