= Chutney Popcorn =

1999 comedy-drama film by Nisha Ganatra

- DVD cover
- Directed by: Nisha Ganatra
- Written by: Susan Carnival; Nisha Ganatra
- Produced by: Susan Carnival; Nisha Ganatra
- Starring: Nisha Ganatra; Jill Hennessy; Sakina Jaffrey; Madhur Jaffrey
- Cinematography: Erin King
- Edited by: Jane Pia Abramowitz
- Music by: Karsh Kale
- Release dates: July 9, 1999 (Outfest); September 22, 2000 (U.S.)
- Running time: 92 minutes
- Country: United States
- Language: English

Chutney Popcorn is a 1999 comedy-drama film starring, directed and co-written by Nisha Ganatra, in her acting, writing and directorial debut. Ganatra plays a young lesbian Indian American woman called Reena. Jill Hennessy plays her girlfriend Lisa, and Reena's mother and sister are played by real life mother and daughter Madhur Jaffrey and Sakina Jaffrey. The film explores the conflict between Reena's sexual and national identities as well as her mother Meenu's attempts to come to terms with the Western lives of both her daughters.

== Plot ==
Reena is a young Indian American lesbian who lives and works in New York City. Her sister Sarita, who is happily married, discovers that she is infertile. Reena offers to be a surrogate mother for her sister's baby, hoping to improve her relationship with their mother, who disapproves of Reena's sexual orientation. Sarita and her husband accept Reena's offer, but Sarita begins to have second thoughts. After Reena becomes pregnant, her relationship with her girlfriend Lisa suffers. When the baby is born, Reena and Lisa are reunited, as are Reena's family.

== Cast ==
- Nisha Ganatra as Reena
- Jill Hennessy as Lisa
- Sakina Jaffrey as Sarita
- Madhur Jaffrey as Meenu
- Nick Chinlund as Mitch
- Cara Buono as Janis
- Ajay Naidu as Raju
- Daniella Rich as Tiffany

== Critical reception ==
On the review aggregator website Rotten Tomatoes, 87% of 15 critics' reviews are positive. Metacritic, which uses a weighted average, assigned the film a score of 66 out of 100, based on 8 critics, indicating "generally favorable" reviews.

== Awards ==
Chutney Popcorn won several film festival awards between 1999 and 2001 including at the San Francisco International Lesbian & Gay Film Festival, the Paris Lesbian Film Festival and L.A. Outfest. It was nominated for a GLAAD Media Award for Outstanding TV Movie in 2001.

== See also ==
- List of LGBT-related films directed by women
