= Dino Morea filmography =

Performances by Dino Morea

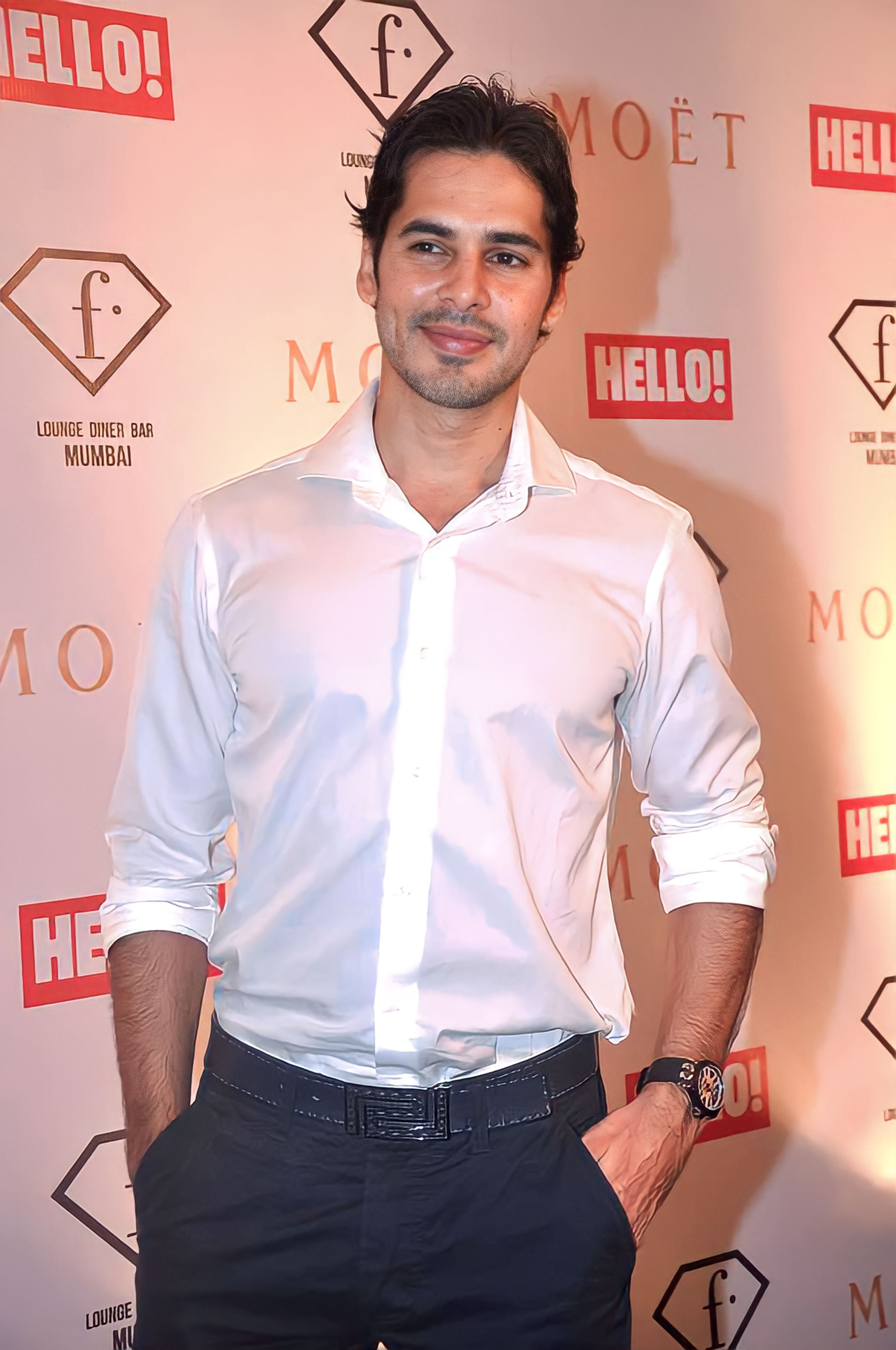
- Morea in 2014
- Film: 50
- Television series: 18
- Web series: 8
- Music videos: 8

Dino Morea is an Indian actor and former supermodel who primarily works in Hindi cinema. He began his career as a model and establishing him as one of the promising faces of Indian modeling.

Morea made his television debut with Captain Vyom (1998), a science-fiction series that earned him early recognition. He transitioned to films with a supporting role in Pyaar Mein Kabhi Kabhi (1999), displaying potential in romantic dramas.

His breakthrough came with the romantic thriller Raaz (2002), opposite Basu. The film became one of the highest-grossing Hindi films of the year and established Morea as a leading actor in suspense and thriller genres.

He later appeared in the thrillers Aksar (2006) and Fight Club (2006), which showcased his versatility across action, romance, and suspense.

In 2014, he played a supporting role in the heist action-comedy Happy New Year, adding a commercial success to his filmography.

However, not all of his films achieved box office success. Titles such as Sssshhh... (2003), Rakht (2004), The Holiday (2006) underperformed commercially, even though his performances were recognized for style and on-screen charisma. Later releases like Life Main Kabie Kabhie (2007), Dus Kahaniyaan (2007), and Bhram (2008) received negative reviews and fared poorly at the box office, representing a challenging period in the early stage of his career. After a break from lead roles, Morea returned with a supporting role in Solo (2017) and embraced streaming platforms, appearing in series such as Mentalhood (2020), Hostages (2020), Tandav (2021), and Kaun Banegi Shikharwati (2022). His portrayal in The Empire (2021) earned him an Indian Television Academy Award.

In 2023, Morea explored darker roles in Agent and Bandra, earning praise for his intensity. In 2025, he returned to mainstream Bollywood with key roles in Mere Husband Ki Biwi and the comedy Housefull 5 as Bedi Dobriyal. Housefull 5 became the seco highest-grossing film in the Housefull franchise and one of the biggest Hindi release of 2025. Critics highlighted Morea's performance as one of the strongest elements in the ensemble.

He also starred in the web series Rana Naidu, The Royals and in Four More Shots Please! in 2025.

== Filmography ==
Key
†	Denotes films, series that have not yet been released

Year	Film	Role	Notes	Ref.
1999	Pyaar Mein Kabhi Kabhi	Siddhant		
2000	Kandukondain Kandukondain	Captain Vinod	Tamil film	
2002	Raaz	Aditya Dhanraj		
2002	Gunaah	Aditya Srivastava		
2003	Baaz: A Bird in Danger	Raj Singh		
2003	Chhal: Game of Death	Hrithik		
2003	Sssshhh...	Rocky		
2004	Ishq Hai Tumse	Arjun Batra		
2004	Plan	Bobby		
2004	Insaaf: The Justice	IPS Officer Abhimanyu Singh		
2004	Rakht: What If You Can See the Future	Sunny		
2005	Chehraa	Akash Mehta		
2006	Aksar	Rajveer Singh (Raj)		
2006	Holiday	Dino Angel		
2006	Fight Club – Members Only	Karan Chopra		
2006	Tom, Dick, and Harry	Tom		
2006	Julie	Shashi Kumar	Kannada film	
2006	Aap Ki Khatir	Danny Grover		
2007	Life Mein Kabhie Kabhiee	Rajeev Arora		
2007	Om Shanti Om	Himself	Special appearance in song "Deewangi Deewangi"	
2007	Dus Kahaniyaan	Dino	Anthology film; segment: Sex on the Beach	
2007	Deha	Rocky		
2008	Bhram	Shantanu		
2008	Meeting Se Meeting Tak	Rahul Bose		
2008	Anamika	Vikram Aditya Singh Sisodiya		
2008	Heroes	Sahil Naqvi		
2008	Har Pal	Ambi	Special appearance	
2008	Karzzzz	Ravi Verma	Special appearance	
2008	Gumnaam – The Mystery	Dev		
2009	Acid Factory	JD		
2009	Main Aurr Mrs Khanna	Sanjay	Special appearance	
2010	Pyaar Impossible!	Varun Sanghvi / Siddharth Sidhu (Note: Morea played a character with two different names.)		
2012	Jism 2	—N/a	As a producer	
2012	Hungama Ho Gaya	Kevin	Short film	
2013	Grand Masti	Himself	Uncredited	
2014	Happy New Year	Himself	Special appearance	
2015	Alone	Kabir	Special appearance	
2017	Solo	Raunaq Sachdeva	Tamil / Malayalam film	
2018	Maa	Vikram Chauhan	Short Film	
2021	Helmet	Biker	Also producer	
2023	Agent	Dharma "The God"	Telugu film	
2023	Bandra	Raghavendra Desai	Malayalam film	
2025	Mere Husband Ki Biwi	Ricky Khanna		
2025	Housefull 5	Bedi Dobriyal		

=== Television ===
Key
†	Denotes television programs that have not yet premiered

Year	Title	Role	Notes	Ref.
1998	Captain Vyom	Sonic		
2005	Remix	Himself		
2006	Get Gorgeous	Host		
2009	Breaking Bread with Dino Morea	Himself		
2010	Fear Factor: Khatron Ke Khiladi season 3	Contestant	3rd place	
2010	CID	Nitin Subash		
2010	Date Trap	Evil Cupid		
2015	I Can Do That	Contestant		
2015	Femina Miss India 2015	Judge		
2018	India's Next Top Model season 4	Guest judge		
2019	Myntra Fashion Superstar	Judge		
2019	Pyaar Actually (Real is Rare)	Jason Daniel		
2020	Mentalhood	Akash		
2020	Hostages	Ranbir		
2021	Tandav	Professor Jigar Sampath		
2021	The Empire	Muhammad Shaybani Khan		
2022	Kaun Banegi Shikharwati	Rudro		
2022	Femina Miss India 2022	Judge		
2025	The Royals	Nawab Salauddin "Salad" Khan		
2025	Rana Naidu	Inspector Naveen Joshi		
2025	Four More Shots Please	Rohan Wanse		

== Discography ==
Dino Morea Non-Film Music Video Appearances
Year	Song Title	Artist	Notes	Reference
1994	Aaja Meri Gaadi Mein Baith Ja	Baba Sehgal	Featured in popular pop video	
1999	Yaad Piya Ki Aane Lagi	Falguni Pathak	Co-starred alongside Riya Sen	
1999	Deewana	Sonu Nigam		
2000	Kabhi Aana Tu Meri Gali	Euphoria	cameo	
2000	Sauda Khara Khara (Original)	Sukhbir	Punjabi hit later remade in Good Newwz(2019)	
2000	Koi Lauta De Woh Pyare Din	Abhijeet Bhattacharya	Opposite of Chitrangada Singh	
2000	Vah Vah	Alisha Chinai		
2014	Jaanam Kuchh To Bolo	Tanya Singh		
2025	Tu Pyaasa Hai	Neha Kakkar		
