= List of Hindi films of 2004 =

This is a list of films produced by the Bollywood film industry based in Mumbai in 2004.

== Top-earning films ==
The top 10 highest worldwide grossing Bollywood films of 2004 are as follows:

Number	Title	Production company	Worldwide gross
1.	Veer-Zaara	Yash Raj Films	₹97.64 crore (US$21.55 million)
2.	Main Hoon Na	Red Chillies Entertainment; Eros International	₹84 crore (US$18.54 million)
3.	Dhoom	Yash Raj Films	₹72.47 crore (US$15.99 million)
4.	Mujhse Shaadi Karogi	Nadiadwala Grandson Entertainment	₹62 crore (US$13.68 million)
5.	Khakee	DMS Films Private Limited	₹49.89 crore (US$11.01 million)
6.	Hum Tum	Yash Raj Films	₹43.22 crore (US$9.54 million)
7.	Swades	Ashutosh Gowariker Productions	₹40.2 crore (US$8.87 million)
8.	Masti	Maruti Films	₹34.14 crore (US$7.53 million)
9.	Hulchul	Venus Records & Tapes	₹33.09 crore (US$7.3 million)
10.	Aitraaz	Mukta Arts	₹29 crore (US$6.4 million)

== List of released films ==
=== January–March ===
Opening		Title	Director	Cast	Genre	Studio
J A N	2	Ishq Hai Tumse	G. Krishna	Bipasha Basu, Dino Morea	Drama	
J A N	9	Chameli	Sudhir Mishra	Kareena Kapoor, Rahul Bose, Kabir Sadanand, Rinke Khanna	Drama	
J A N	9	Paisa Vasool	Srinivas Bhashyam	Manisha Koirala, Sushmita Sen, Sushant Singh, Tinu Anand, Makrand Deshpande	Black comedy	
J A N	9	Plan	Hriday Shetty	Sanjay Dutt, Priyanka Chopra, Dino Morea, Sanjay Suri, Riya Sen, Rohit Roy, Sameera Reddy	Action	
J A N	16	Ek Hasina Thi	Sriram Raghavan	Saif Ali Khan, Urmila Matondkar, Murli Sharma, Seema Biswas, Pratima Kazmi, Rasika Joshi	Thriller, drama	
J A N	23	Aetbaar	Vikram Bhatt	Amitabh Bachchan, Bipasha Basu, John Abraham, Tom Alter, Ali Asgar	Thriller	
J A N	23	Khakee	Rajkumar Santoshi	Amitabh Bachchan, Akshay Kumar, Ajay Devgn, Aishwarya Rai, Tusshar Kapoor, Atul Kulkarni	Action, thriller	
J A N	30	Maqbool	Vishal Bhardwaj	Tabu, Pankaj Kapoor, Irrfan Khan, Moushumi Chatterjee, Om Puri	Mystery, drama	Yash Raj Films, Kaleidoscope Entertainment
J A N	30	Paap	Pooja Bhatt	John Abraham, Udita Goswami, Bikramjeet Kanwarpal, Gulshan Grover, Mohan Agashe, Anahita Uberoi	Drama	
F E B	27	Agnipankh	Sanjeev Puri	Jimmy Shergill, Rahul Dev, Divya Dutta, Shamita Shetty	War, drama	Shree Ashtavinayak Cine Vision
M A R						

== Released films (A-Z format) ==
Title	Director	Cast	Genre
Aabra Ka Daabra	Dheeraj Kumar	Hansika Motwani, Shweta Tiwari, Vishal Lalwani, Archana Puran Singh	Fantasy
Aan: Men at Work	Madhur Bhandarkar	Akshay Kumar, Sunil Shetty, Shatrughan Sinha, Irrfan Khan, Paresh Rawal, Jackie Shroff, Lara Dutta, Raveena Tandon	Action
Ab... Bas!	Rajesh Singh	Diana Hayden, Shawar Ali, Rohit Roy	Thriller
Ab Tak Chappan	Shimit Amin	Nana Patekar, Mohan Agashe, Revathi, Prasad Purandare, Hrishitaa Bhatt	Crime, drama
Ab Tumhare Hawale Watan Saathiyo	Anil Sharma	Amitabh Bachchan, Akshay Kumar, Bobby Deol, Divya Khosla Kumar, Sandali Sinha	War, drama
Aitraaz	Abbas–Mustan	Akshay Kumar, Kareena Kapoor, Priyanka Chopra, Upasna Singh, Amrish Puri	Drama, romance, thriller
AK-47	Raam Shetty	Aditya Singh, Sheetal Bhavishi, Om Puri, Shivaji Satam, Ashish Vidyarthi	Action
Asambhav	Rajiv Rai	Arjun Rampal, Priyanka Chopra, Arif Zakaria, Naseeruddin Shah	Mystery, thriller
Bardaasht	E.Nivas	Bobby Deol, Lara Dutta, Ritesh Deshmukh, Rahul Dev, Virendra Saxena, Raju Kher	Action, drama, thriller
Bhola in Bollywood	Sumbul Gazi	Ali Asgar, Siraj Khan, Avtar Gill, Raj Babbar	Comedy
Chand Bujh Gaya	Sharique Minhaj	Faisal Khan, Shama Sikander, Aliza	Romance
Charas	Tigmanshu Dhulia	Jimmy Shergill, Irrfan Khan, Uday Chopra, Hrishita Bhatt, Namrata Shirodkar	Action
Deewaar	Milan Luthria	Amitabh Bachchan, Sanjay Dutt, Akshaye Khanna, Kay Kay Menon, Amrita Rao	Drama
Dev	Govind Nihalani	Amitabh Bachchan, Fardeen Khan, Kareena Kapoor, Rati Agnihotri, Om Puri, Amrish Puri	Drama
Dhoom	Sanjay Gadhvi	Abhishek Bachchan, John Abraham, Uday Chopra, Esha Deol, Rimi Sen	Thriller, action
Dil Bechara Pyaar Ka Maara	Omkarnath Mishra	Vikas Kalantri, Aslam Khan, Divya Palat, Rajpal Yadav, Mallika Kapoor	Comedy
Dil Maange More	Anant Mahadevan	Shahid Kapoor, Ayesha Takia, Soha Ali Khan, Tulip Joshi, Kanwaljit Singh, Gulshan Grover	Romance, comedy
Dil Ne Jise Apna Kahaa	Atul Agnihotri	Salman Khan, Preity Zinta, Bhumika Chawla	Drama, romance
Dobara	Shashi Ranjan	Raveena Tandon, Jackie Shroff, Mahima Chaudhry	Drama
Dukaan	Iqbal Durrani	Vikas Kalantri, Rambha, Rati Agnihotri	Adult romance
Ek Se Badhkar Ek	Kundan Shah	Suniel Shetty, Raveena Tandon, Isha Koppikar	Comedy
Fida	Ken Ghosh	Fardeen Khan, Kareena Kapoor, Shahid Kapoor, Kim Sharma	Drama, romance, thriller
Garv	Puneet Issar	Salman Khan, Shilpa Shetty, Anupam Kher, Arbaaz Khan, Mukesh Rishi, Amrish Puri	Drama
Gayab	Prawal Raman	Tusshar Kapoor, Antara Mali, Raghubir Yadav	Fantasy, thriller
Girlfriend	Karan Razdan	Amrita Arora, Isha Koppikar, Aashish Chaudhary	Drama, romance
Hatya	Kader Kashmiri	Akshay Kumar, Navin Nischol, Reema Lagoo, Varsha Usgaonkar	Fantasy
Hava Aney Dey	Partho Sen-Gupta	Nishikant Kamat, Tannishtha Chatterjee, Rajshree Thakur	Drama
Hawas	Karan Razdan	Shawar Ali, Meghna Naidu, Tarun Arora	Erotic thriller
Hulchul	Priyadarshan	Akshaye Khanna, Kareena Kapoor, Sharad Kelkar, Jackie Shroff, Sunil Shetty, Amrish Puri, Arshad Warsi, Paresh Rawal, Arbaaz Khan	Comedy, drama, romance, family
Hum Tum	Kunal Kohli	Saif Ali Khan, Rani Mukherji, Rishi Kapoor, Kirron Kher, Rati Agnihotri, Jimmy Sheirgill, Isha Koppikar, Abhishek Bachchan	Comedy, romance, drama, musical
Hyderabad Blues 2	Nagesh Kukunoor	Tisca Chopra, Elahe Hiptoola, Jyoti Dogra, Vikram Inamdar, Anu Chengappa	Drama
I Proud to Be an Indian	Puneet Issar	Sohail Khan, Gulzar Inder Chahal, Puneet Issar, Tim Lawrence	Action, romance
Insaaf: The Justice	Shrey Srivastava	Dino Morea, Namrata Shirodkar, Sanjay Suri, Henna, Rajpal Yadav	Action
Inteqam: The Perfect Game	Pankaj Parashar	Nethra Raghuraman, Manoj Bajpai, Isha Koppikar	Action
Jaago	Mrhul Kumar	Manoj Bajpayee, Sanjay Kapoor, Raveena Tandon, Hansika Motwani	Crime, thriller
Julie	Deepak Shivdasani	Neha Dhupia, Yash Tonk, Sanjay Kapoor, Priyanshu Chatterjee	Drama
Kaash... Hamara Dil Pagal Na Hota	Mangal Anand	Mukesh Ahuja, Chetan Aneja, Nigel Borade	Drama
Kaun Hai Jo Sapno Mein Aaya	Rajesh Bhatt	Anupam Kher, Richa Pallod, Rakesh Bapat, Kader Khan, Rajesh Bhatt	Romance
Kaya Taran	Sashi Kumar	Seema Biswas, Angad Bedi, Neelambari Bhattacharya, Neeta Mohindra	Drama
Khamosh Pani	Sabiha Kumar	Kirron Kher, Amar Ali Malik	Drama
King of Bollywood	Piyush Jha	Om Puri, Sophie Dahl, Kavita Kapoor	Comedy
Kis Kis Ki Kismat	Govind Menon	Dharmendra, Mallika Sherawat, Rati Agnihotri, Satish Shah	Comedy
Kismat	Guddu Dhanoa	Priyanka Chopra, Bobby Deol	Thriller
Kiss Kis Ko	Sharad Sharan	Karan Oberoi, Sudhanshu Pandey, Sherrin Varghese, Siddharth Haldipur, Chaitnya Bhosale	Adult comedy
Krishna Cottage	Santram Varma	Sohail Khan, Isha Koppikar, Natassha	Thriller
Kyun! Ho Gaya Na...	Samir Karnik	Vivek Oberoi, Aishwarya Rai, Amitabh Bachchan, Sunil Shetty, Diya Mirza, Rati Agnihotri, Arjun Mathur, Kajal Aggarwal	Romance, drama, comedy
Lakeer – Forbidden Lines	Ahmed Khan	Sunil Shetty, Sunny Deol, Sohail Khan, John Abraham, Nauheed Cyrusi, Apoorva Agnihotri	Action, drama, romance
Lakshya	Farhan Akhtar	Amitabh Bachchan, Hrithik Roshan, Preity Zinta, Lillete Dubey, Kushal Punjabi, Amrish Puri, Om Puri, Sharad Kapoor	War, drama, action, romance
Let's Enjoy	Ankur Tewari, Siddharth Anand Kumar	Shomendra Bose, Aashish Chaudhary, Roshni Chopra, Arzoo Govitrikar, Shiv Panditt, Sahil Gupta, Dhruv Jagasiya	Adult thriller
Madhoshi	Tanveer Khan	Bipasha Basu, John Abraham, Priyanshu Chatterjee	Drama, romance, thriller
Main Hoon Na	Farah Khan	Shahrukh Khan, Sushmita Sen, Sunil Shetty, Amrita Rao, Zayed Khan	Action, musical, drama, comedy
Masti	Indra Kumar	Vivek Oberoi, Aftab Shivdasani, Lara Dutta, Riteish Deshmukh, Ajay Devgn, Genelia D'souza, Tara Sharma, Amrita Rao, Rakhi Sawant, Murali Sharma	Comedy
Meenaxi: A Tale of Three Cities	M. F. Hussain	Tabu, Kunal Kapoor, Rajpal Yadav, Nadira Babbar	Romance, musical drama
Meri Biwi Ka Jawaab Nahin (Delayed film, originally produced in 1994)	S. M. Iqbal, Pankaj Parashar	Sridevi, Akshay Kumar	Action, comedy, romance
Morning Raga	Mahesh Dattan	Shabana Azmi, Perizaad Zorabian	Drama
Mujhse Shaadi Karogi	David Dhawan	Salman Khan, Akshay Kumar, Priyanka Chopra, Amrish Puri	Comedy, romance, musical
Murder	Anurag Basu	Emraan Hashmi, Ashmit Patel, Mallika Sherawat	Thriller, romance
Musafir	Sanjay Gupta	Anil Kapoor, Sanjay Dutt, Sameera Reddy, Aditya Pancholi, Koena Mitra, Mahesh Manjrekar	Thriller
Muskaan	Rohit Nayyar, Rohit Manash	Aftab Shivdasani, Gracy Singh, Parvin Dabas, Kader Khan, Anupam Kher	Romance, drama
Mysteries Shaque	Vinod Chhabara,	Janki Shah, Quber Chauhan, Prem Chopra, Upasana Singh, Aarti Puri	Action, thriller
Naach	Ram Gopal Varma	Antara Mali, Abhishek Bachchan, Ritesh Deshmukh	Drama
Netaji Subhas Chandra Bose: The Forgotten Hero	Shyam Benegal	Sachin Khedekar, Kulbhushan Kharbanda, Rajit Kapur, Arif Zakaria, Divya Dutta	War, biographical
Phir Milenge	Revathy	Nassar, Shilpa Shetty, Salman Khan, Abhishek Bachchan, Revathi	Drama, social
Police Force: An Inside Story	Dilip Shukla	Akshay Kumar, Raveena Tandon, Raj Babbar, Amrish Puri, S. M. Zaheer, Mohan Joshi	Action
Popcorn Khao! Mast Ho Jao	Kabir Sadanand	Akshay Kapoor, Tanisha, Yash Tonk, Reshmi Nigam	
Raincoat	Rituparno Ghosh	Ajay Devgn, Aishwarya Rai	Drama
Rakht	Mahesh Manjrekar	Sunil Shetty, Neha Dhupia, Abhishek Bachchan, Dino Morea, Himanshu Malik, Amrita Arora, Bipasha Basu, Sanjay Dutt	Horror
Rok Sako To Rok Lo	Arindam Chowdhury	Sunny Deol, Yash Pandit	Sports comedy
Rudraksh	Mani Shankar	Suniel Shetty, Sanjay Dutt, Bipasha Basu, Isha Koppikar	Thriller
Run	Jeeva	Abhishek Bachchan, Bhoomika Chawla, Vijay Raaz, Ayesha Jhulka, Mahesh Manjrekar	Action, drama, romance
Shaadi Ka Laddoo	Raj Kaushal	Sanjay Suri, Mandira Bedi, Divya Dutta, Aashish Chaudhary	Comedy
Shart: The Challenge	Puri Jagannadh	Tusshar Kapoor, Gracy Singh, Amrita Arora	Action, drama
Sheen	Ashok Pandit	Tarun Arora, Raj Babbar, Anoop Soni, Kiran Juneja	Romance
Shikaar	Darshan Bagga	Kanishka Sodhi, Jas Pandher	Drama
Shukriya: Till Death Do Us Apart	Anupam Sinha	Anupam Kher, Aftab Shivdasani, Shriya Saran	Drama
Silence Please...The Dressing Room	Sanjay Srinivas	Salil Ankola, Sonali Kulkarni, Tom Alter	Thriller
Stop!	Ajai Sinha	Gauri Karnik, Ishitta Arun, Rocky Bhatia, Tejaswini Kolhapure, Kiran Jhanjhani, Harsh Chhaya, Ali Asgar, Dia Mirza	Romance, drama
Suno Sasurjee	Vimal Kumar	Aftab, Ameesha Patel	Romance, comedy
Swades	Ashutosh Gowarikar	Shahrukh Khan, Gayatri Joshi, Kishori Ballal	Drama, social
Taarzan: The Wonder Car	Abbas Mustan	Vatsal Seth, Ayesha Takia, Pankaj Dheer, Ajay Devgn	Fantasy thriller
Tauba Tauba	T L V Prasad	Payal Rohatgi, Antara Biswas, Amin Gazi	Sex comedy
Thoda Tum Badlo Thoda Hum	Esmayeel Shroff	Arya Babbar, Shriya Saran, Ashok Saraf	Romance
Tumsa Nahin Dekha: A Love Story	Anurag Basu	Emraan Hashmi, Diya Mirza	Romance
Uuf Kya Jaadoo Mohabbat Hai	Manoj J. Bhatia	Sammir Dattani, Pooja Kanwal, Sandhya Mridul, Akshay Anand	Romance
Vaastu Shastra	Saurab Narang	J. D. Chakravarthy, Ahsaas Channa, Vicky Ahuja, Sushmita Sen	Horror
Veer-Zaara	Yash Chopra	Shah Rukh Khan, Rani Mukerji, Preity Zinta, Manoj Bajpai, Amitabh Bachchan, Hema Malini, Boman Irani, Kirron Kher, Divya Dutta, Anupam Kher	Drama, romance, family, musical, social, period
Wajahh: A Reason to Kill	Gautama Adhikari	Arbaaz Khan, Shamita Shetty, Gracy Singh	Thriller
Woh	Raj N. Sippy	Priyanshu Chatterjee, Cleo Issacs, Shahbaz Khan	Thriller
Yeh Lamhe Judaai Ke (Delayed film, originally produced in 1994)	Birendra Nath Tiwary	Shahrukh Khan, Raveena Tandon, Mohnish Bahl, Rashmi Desai, Amit Kumar, Navneet Nishan	Drama
Yuva	Mani Ratnam	Ajay Devgn, Abhishek Bachchan, Vivek Oberoi, Rani Mukherji, Kareena Kapoor, Esha Deol	Drama

== See also ==
- List of Hindi films of 2005
- List of Hindi films of 2003
