= Dino Morea =

Indian actor (born 1975)

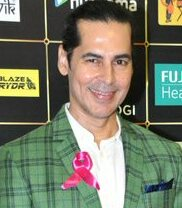
- Morea in 2023
- Born: 9 December 1975 (age 50); Bangalore, Karnataka, India
- Education: Bangalore Military School; Clarence High School (India); St. Joseph's College
- Occupations: Actor; Model; Producer; Entrepreneur
- Years active: 1995–present
- Works: Full list
- Awards: Full list

Signature
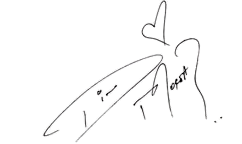

Dino Morea (/ˈdiːnoʊ məˈreɪə/; born 9 December 1975) is an Indian actor and former supermodel who has appeared in Hindi, Tamil, Kannada, Malayalam, and Telugu films. Morea forged a celebrated career in fashion modeling and has been cited in the media as one of India's best supermodels, setting the benchmark for style, presence, and versatility. (Note: Attributed Multiple References:)

The 2002 romantic horror Raaz proved to be his breakthrough which was critically and commercially successful and becoming second highest grosser of the year. Subsequently, he featured in several commercially successful films, including, Gunaah (2002), Aksar (2006), Tom Dick Harry (2006) and Happy New Year (2014). He also featured in Baaz (2003), Plan (2004), Holiday (2006), Dus Kahaniyaan (2007), Bhram (2008), and Acid Factory (2009). Following a series of commercial setbacks, his appearances in films became less frequent in the 2010s.

In the 2020s, Morea transitioned to streaming platforms, acting in series such as Mentalhood (2020), Hostages (2020), Tandav (2021), Kaun Banegi Shikharwati (2022), The Royals (2025), and Rana Naidu (2025). His performance in The Empire (2021) earned him an Indian Television Academy Award. He marked his comeback in Bollywood with the Housefull 5 (2025). The film was ranked Morea's most commercially successful film, ranking as the year's one of the highest grosser.

== Early life and background ==
Morea was born in Bangalore, Karnataka, to an Italian father and an Indian mother from Kalamassery, Kochi, Kerala. He spent the first eleven years of his life in Italy before returning to India. According to Morea, his name means "strong and powerful". He is the second of three brothers; his elder brother is Nicolò Morea and his younger brother is Santino Morea. Morea was educated at Bangalore Military School and Clarence High School, and later graduated from St. Joseph's College in Bangalore. While studying in college he represented India in U-13 tennis competition. He began modelling professionally and was subsequently offered his first acting role after being noticed during a fashion campaign.

== Modeling career ==
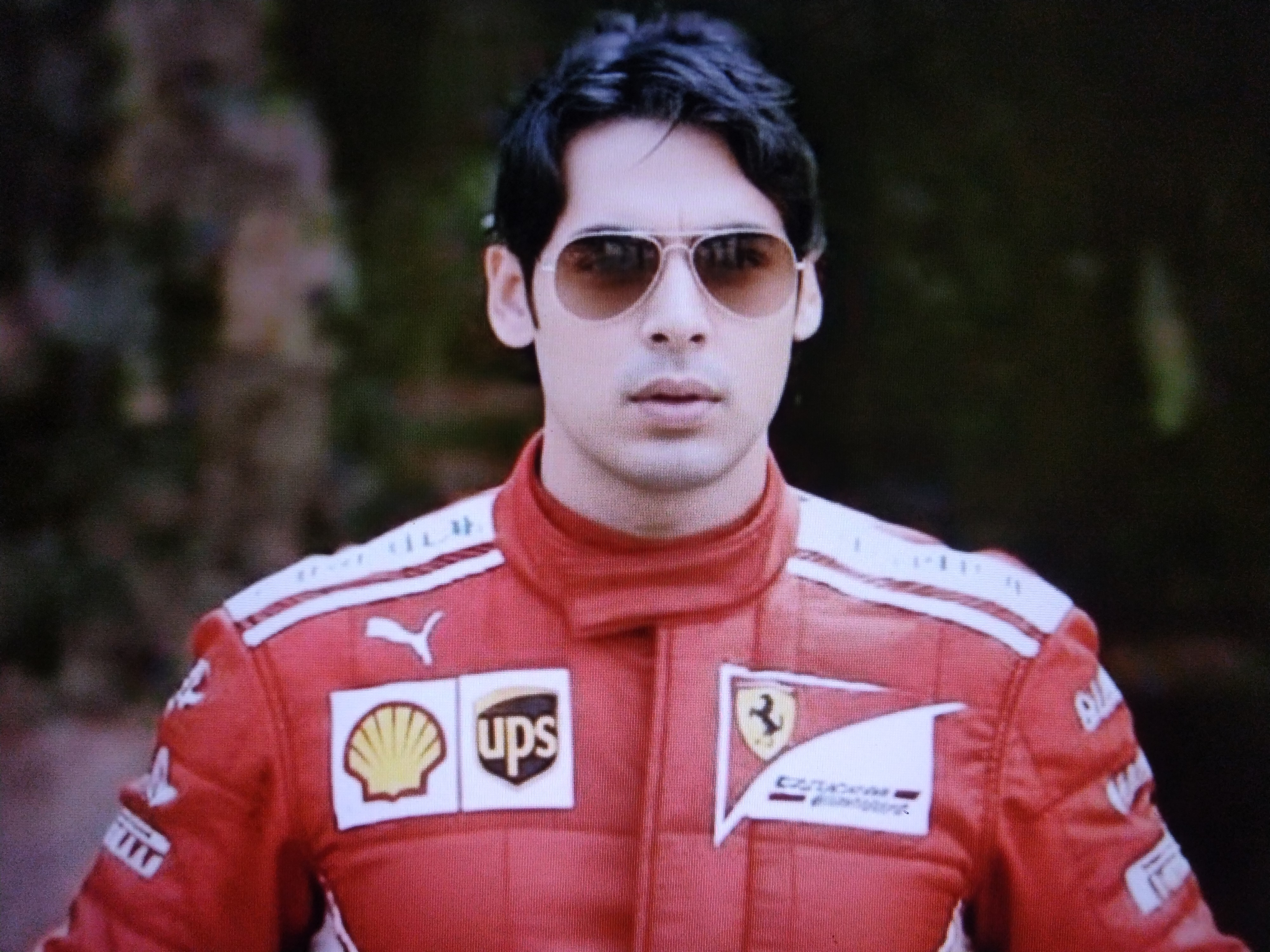
Morea in Formula 1

Morea began his professional career as a fashion model, working with various clothing and lifestyle brands. In 1995, he won the Gladrags Manhunt Contest and subsequently represented India at the Manhunt International competition held in Singapore, where he became the first Indian to placed second. He later won the Gladrags Supermodel Contest in 1999.

== Acting career ==
=== 1998–2002: Debut and breakthrough ===
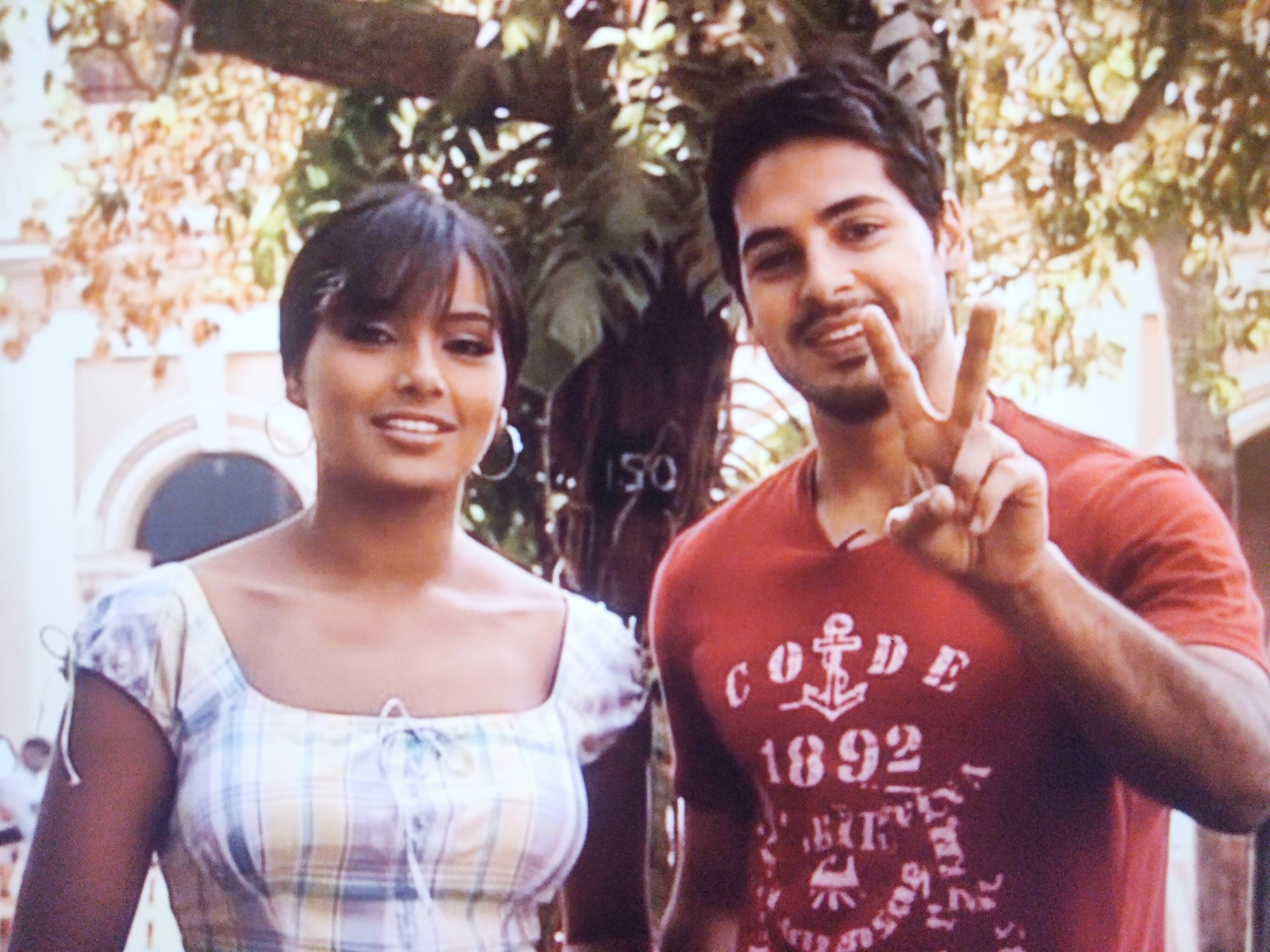
Morea with his then partner Bipasha Basu in Mumbai

Morea began his acting career with a role in the television series Captain Vyom, where he played the character Sonic. He made his film debut in Pyaar Mein Kabhi Kabhi (1999), opposite Rinke Khanna. The film was aimed at a young audience and earned him a nomination for the Zee Cine Award for Best Male Debut, although the award went to Aftab Shivdasani for Kasoor (2001).

His breakthrough came with Rajiv Menon's Tamil-language film Kandukondain Kandukondain (2000), an adaptation of Jane Austen's Sense and Sensibility, where he appeared alongside an ensemble cast.

In 2002, Morea starred in Raaz, a commercially and critically successful horror thriller directed by Vikram Bhatt. The film established Morea in the Hindi film industry. His portrayal of Aditya Dhanraj received positive reviews from the critics. Shah Rukh Khan praised Morea's performance and said "Your film is really doing well". He won a Zee Cine Award in the category of Dynamic Duo with Bipasha Basu. Raaz was both a commercial and critical success, and served as the best film of his career. His role as Aditya Dhanraj was noted in the media, and he received a Star Screen Award for Best Jodi along with co-star Bipasha Basu.

That same year, he appeared in Gunaah, directed by Amol Shetge. The film was a commercial success, and Morea's performance received positive commentary in some reviews.

=== 2003–2019: Fluctuations and hiatus ===
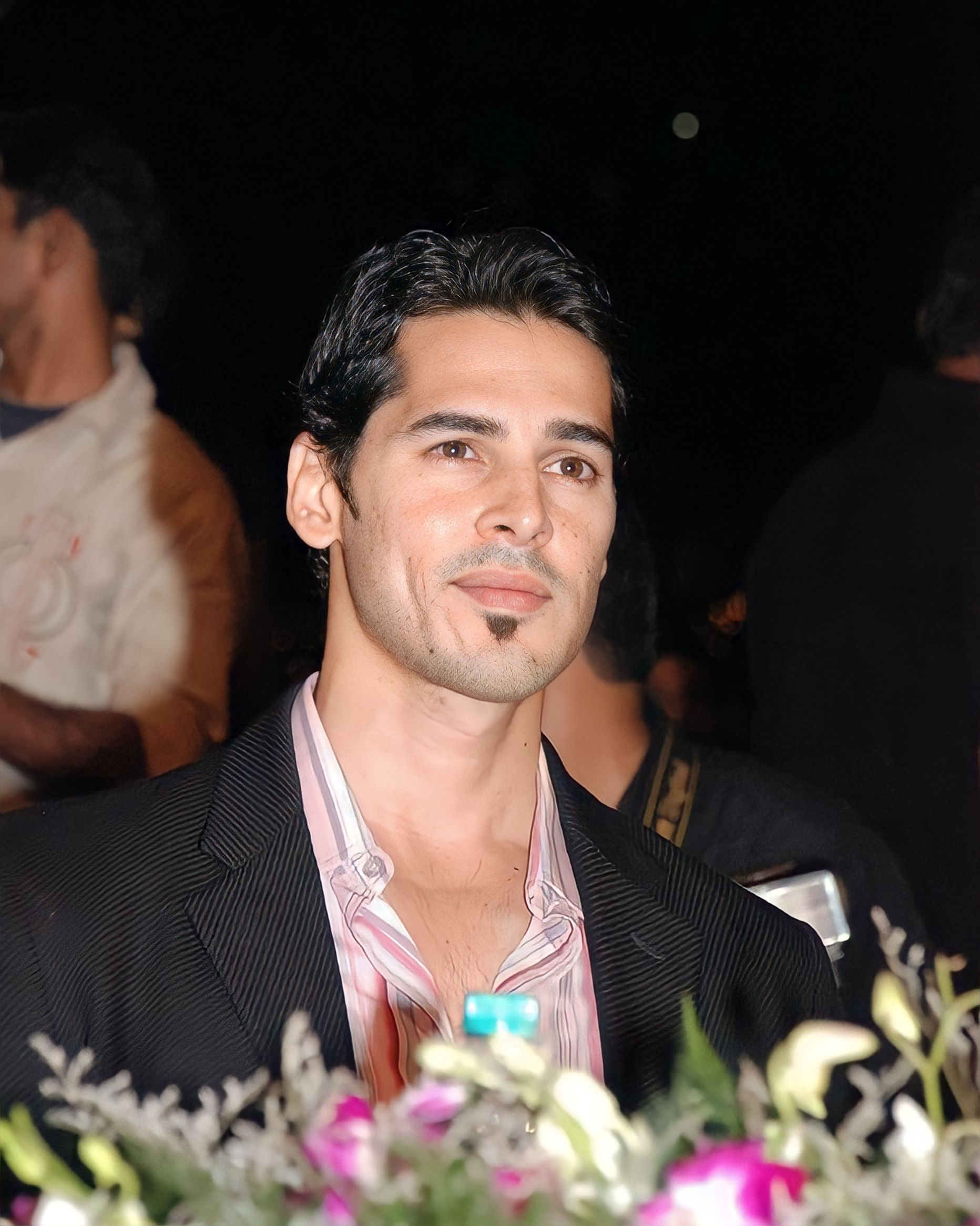
Morea at the Gladrags Mega Model Manhunt contest, 2008

After the success of Raaz (2002), Morea appeared in a series of films throughout the mid-2000s. In 2003, he starred in three films: Baaz: A Bird in Danger, Chal: The Game of Death, and Sssshhh.... His role in Sssshhh... earned him a nomination for the Stardust Award for Superstar of Tomorrow – Male.

In 2004, he appeared in four films. These included Ishq Hai Tumse, a remake of the Telugu film Sampangi; Plan, an action thriller directed by Sanjay Gupta; Insaaf: The Justice, in which he portrayed a police officer; and Rakt, a supernatural thriller. His performances in Plan and Rakt received a mixed critical response, with some reviewers noting his improvement in dramatic roles.

In 2005, Morea appeared in Chehraa, playing a medical student opposite Bipasha Basu, Preeti Jhangiani, and Irrfan Khan.

In 2006, he starred in Aksar, a commercially profitable thriller despite negative reviews. It is considered as his successful film after Raaz and Gunaah. He also appeared in Holiday, a musical romance directed by Pooja Bhatt. In 2007, he featured in Fight Club: Members Only, Tom, Dick, and Harry, and the Kannada-language remake Julie. He also played a supporting role in Aap Ki Khatir, which did not perform well at the box office.

Morea had four releases in 2007. He starred in Life Mein Kabhie Kabhiee, which failed to perform commercially; made a cameo in Om Shanti Om during the song "Deewangi Deewangi"; appeared in Dus Kahaniyaan, an anthology film; and acted in Deha, his final release that year.

In 2008, Morea acted in the thriller film Bhram, portraying a supermodel. He was also involved in Meeting Se Meeting Tak, an unreleased project.

His final major acting role during this period was in Pyaar Impossible!(2010). That same year, he participated as a contestant on the reality television show Khatron Ke Khiladi.

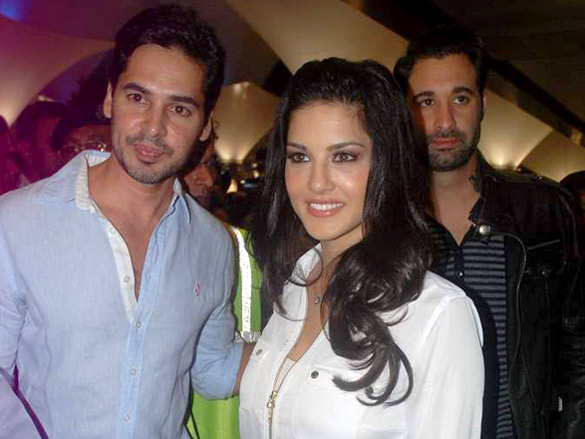
Morea with Sunny Leone in 2012

Morea transitioned to production in 2012 with the erotic thriller Jism 2, which starred Sunny Leone in her Bollywood debut and performed well commercially. He appeared as Anand Joshi in Happy New Year (2014) and made cameo in Alone (2015).

=== 2020–present: Streaming ventures and resurgence ===
After a hiatus from lead roles, Morea returned to acting with a supporting role in Solo (2017) and later appeared in several streaming series, including Mentalhood (2020), Hostages (2020), Tandav (2021), and Kaun Banegi Shikharwati (2022). His performance in The Empire (2021) earned him an Indian Television Academy Award.in 2023, He appeared as an antagonist in Agent and Bandra. 2025, he played a significant role in the film Mere Husband Ki Biwi. He also appeared in the comedy sequel Housefull 5 as Bedi Dobriyal. The film features an ensemble cast including Akshay Kumar, Riteish Deshmukh, Abhishek Bachchan, Sanjay Dutt, Fardeen Khan, Jackie Shroff, Nargis Fakhri, Chitrangada Singh, Chunky Pandey and Johnny Lever. The film went on to become the second highest‑grossing installment in the Housefull franchise, making it the eight-biggest Hindi film of 2025. Indian entertainment publication Bollywood Hungama praised his performance as a "solid and strong," while Firstpost highlighted Morea's performance as a standout amidst the film's entertaining but sometimes overstretched storyline. The Times of India and other critics appreciated the humor but noted the film lacked consistently strong material overall. He also starred in the web series Rana Naidu and The Royals the same year. He appeared in Four More Shots Please.

== Off-screen work ==
=== Philanthropy ===
Morea serves as the captain and midfielder of the All Stars Football Club, a celebrity football team that participates in matches to raise funds for charitable causes. He played in a high-profile charity cricket match organized by the IIFA Foundation at Headingley Carnegie Stadium in Leeds, England, on 8 June 2007. The event featured a star-studded Indian celebrity team—including Virat Kohli, Kapil Dev, Vivek Oberoi, Ajay Devgn, Shilpa Shetty, Sunny Deol, and many others—competing against a UK celebrity team and the match benefited the IIFA Foundation's charitable causes. Morea attended a charity football match for the Salman Khan's Being Human Foundation in Mumbai on 15 August 2009. Dino joined Salman Khan, Aamir Khan, Amitabh Bachchan, and others for a blood donation camp in Bandra, Mumbai on 15 August 2010. In March 2013, he participated in a match to support the Magic Funds Organisation, which works with underprivileged children. In 2016, he became associated with Pet Fed, an event platform for pets, joining as an investor and supporter.

=== Brand endorsement ===
Morea has also been engaged as a brand ambassador to represent sport leagues, charity organizations, and Indian states. He has endorsed prominent brands including Bisleri Vedica, 7 Up, Close up, Colgate Fresh, Live (in), Calida, Lakmé, Siyaram, Hero Honda CBZ, Monte Carlo and Chronotech. (Note: References:) In May 2008, Dino Morea signed up as the brand ambassador for Bangalore Marathon. In September 2009, he became the brand ambassador of Goa Pro Soccer League.

=== Backstage performances ===
Morea has taken part in several stage performances and international concert tours. In 2010, he performed at a concert in Suva, Fiji, alongside Priyanka Chopra. In 2011, he joined Shah Rukh Khan, Rani Mukerji, and Dia Mirza at the Airtel-Bindass concert tour. In 2014, he participated in a live performance event in Pune with Snoop Dogg.

=== Business ===
Morea has been involved in multiple entrepreneurial initiatives. In 2012, he co-founded the merchandising company Cool Maal with cricketer MS Dhoni and Yuvraj Singh. He later established Clockwise Films, a production company, in 2013. That same year, he co-founded a lifestyle and entertainment venture called Playground with Nandita Mahtani. He has partnership with a photo sharing app called Vebbler. He owns a restaurants named Crepe Station Café in Bandra. It is one of the fastest developing chains in India which offers pancakes, waffles and eggs benedict.

In 2013, he initiated the installation of outdoor fitness stations in Wadala and Bandra, Mumbai. These facilities were inaugurated with the involvement of actor Hrithik Roshan and politician Aaditya Thackeray.

In 2019, Morea and restaurateur Ketan Kadam received an award from People for the Ethical Treatment of Animals (PETA) for a project aimed at replacing horse-drawn carriages in Mumbai with battery-operated electric vehicles.

He is also the co-founder of The Fresh Press, a cold-pressed juice brand, and serves as a board director at the Gruhas Collective Consumer Fund (GCCF), an investment platform focused on consumer brands. (Note: References:)

== Personal life ==
Morea resides in Bandra, Mumbai, in a home named Casa-Morea. He is known for maintaining a disciplined fitness routine and was recognized with the Iconic Health & Fitness Ambassador award at the Showbiz Icon Awards. He is reported to be fluent in several languages, including English, Hindi, Italian, Urdu, Kannada, French, and Portuguese.

=== Relationship ===
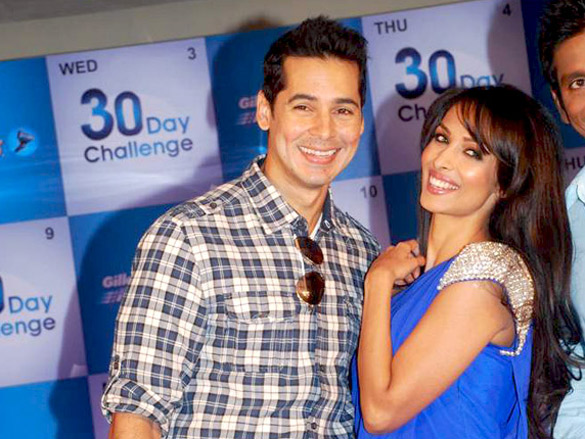
Morea with partner Malaika Arora

Morea began a relationship with actress Bipasha Basu in 1996. The two worked together in multiple films and modeling assignments. In 1998, an advertisement for the Swiss undergarment brand Calida featuring Morea and Basu drew controversy for its content and was subsequently withdrawn. The couple ended their relationship shortly after the release of Raaz (2002).

He was briefly in a relationship with actress and model Lara Dutta from 2008 to 2009. From 2010 to 2017, he was in a relationship with designer Nandita Mahtani. In 2025, Morea confirmed he was in a relationship with Malaika Arora.

=== Belief ===
Morea was raised in a Roman Catholic household and has openly celebrated Christian festivals such as Easter with his family. In 2023, Morea was invited among several members of India's Christian community to a Christmas celebration hosted by Prime Minister Narendra Modi at his official residence in New Delhi.

== In the media ==
=== Artistry and legacy ===
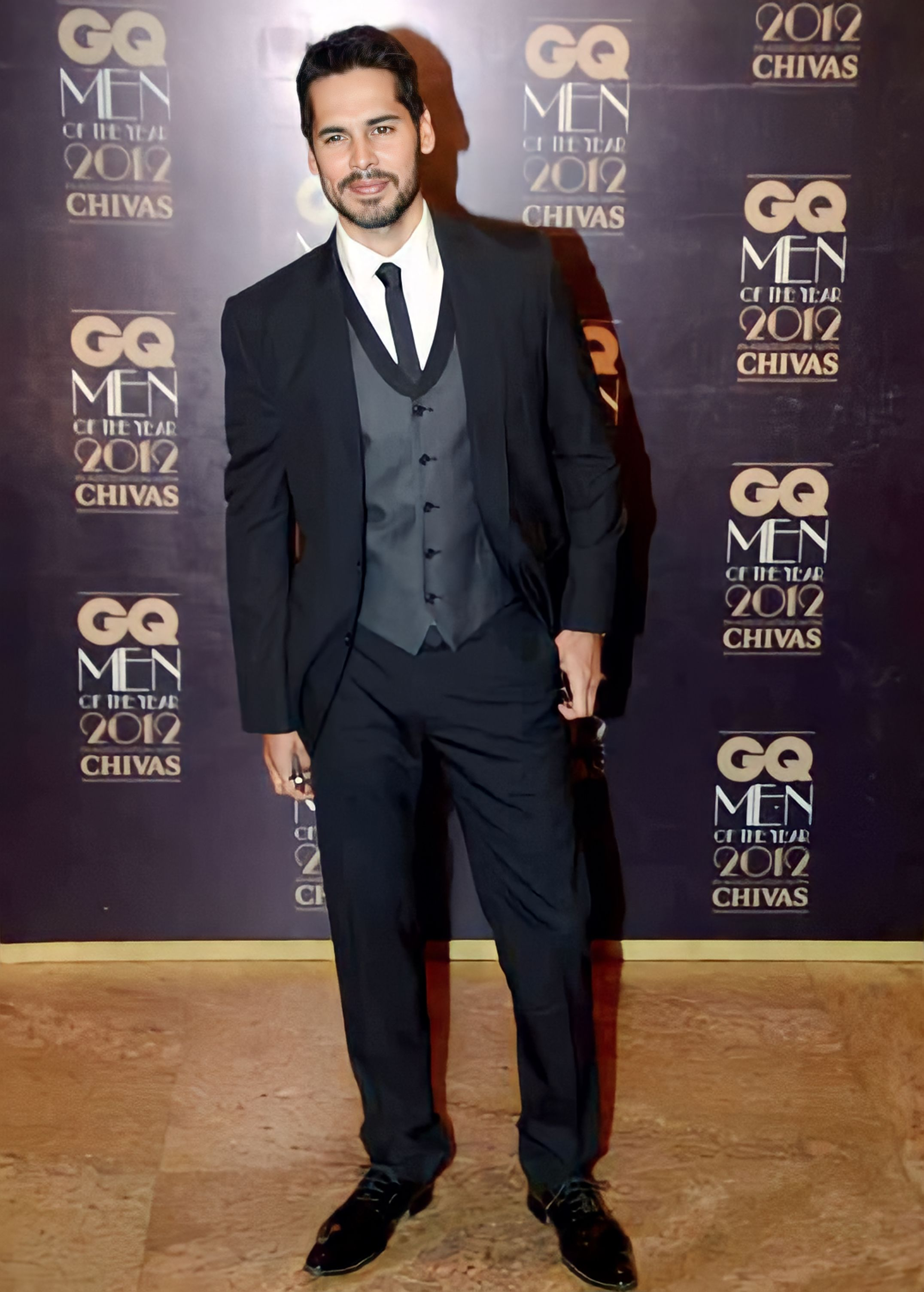
Morea at GQ Men Of The Year 2012

In Indian media, Morea has often been referred to as a "Chocolate Boy", a term used to describe his youthful appearance and conventional attractiveness. (Note: References:) He dominated and redefined the Indian modeling scene before male modeling was mainstream, gained international recognition, had the perfect look for print and runway, and bridged the gap to Bollywood, influencing generations after him. He has been noted for his commitment to his roles and described as having a versatile screen presence. A 2008 feature in India Today titled "The Boylet Club" identified him as one of Bollywood's "alpha males" of the time. South China Morning Post cited him as one of the top Indian male models who successfully transitioned into acting. In 2025, The Times of India marked him “…the unforgettable 90s heroes who became India’s first big crushes”, describing him as “tall, white, and incredibly handsome”. Motherland magazine regarded him as 'Supermodel of 2000s'. Film critics and journalists have occasionally commented on his style and performances; Onkar Kulkarni of Times of India referred to him as a "stylish superhero," while Taran Adarsh of Bollywood Hungama remarked on his sincerity and screen presence.

In February 1999, Morea appeared on the cover of the international edition of Elle magazine. He clinched 13th place on "India's most handsome man" by WebIndia123. He ranked on The Times of India's "50 Most Desirable Men" list for multiple years, including 13th in 2009, and between 30th and 45th place from 2010 to 2014. (Note: References:) He was also listed in GQ India's "Best Dressed Men" rankings in 2010, 2012, 2015, and 2017. In 2023, he was placed 19th in 30 All Time Famous Bollywood Actors of All Time. Moreover, he was inducted into the Gladrags Hall of Fame.

=== Wealth and assets ===
Morea has been listed in various publications among Indian film personalities with significant net worth. As of 2025, his net worth has been estimated at over US$150 million by some sources. (Note: References:) He is reported to own several high-end vehicles, including models such as the Rolls Royce Ghost, BMW M8, Lamborghini Sián, Mercedes GLS, Porsche 911, Ford Endeavour, as well as motorcycles like the Harley-Davidson Forty-Eight, Royal Enfield Bullet 500, and Aprilia RSV4. (Note: References:) Reports also indicate that he owns multiple residential properties in India and abroad.

== Awards and nominations ==
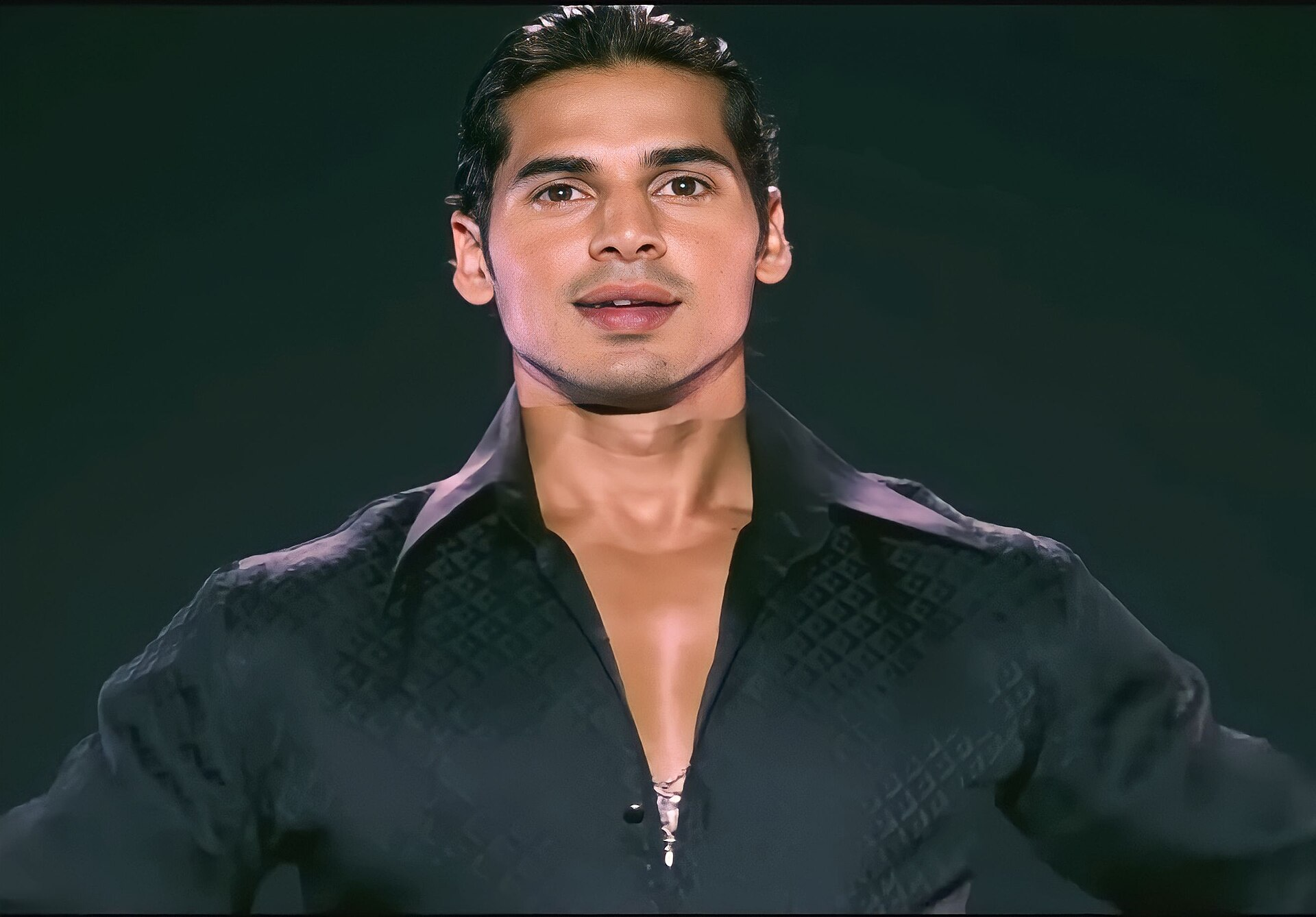
Morea at the 63rd Cannes Film Festival, 2010

Year	Award Show	Award	Film	Won	Ref.
1995	Gladrags Supermodel Contest	Most Popular Model Award	—N/a	Honoured	
1999	Zee Cine Awards	Best Male Debut	Pyaar Mein Kabhi Kabhi	Nominated	
2002	Zee Cine Awards	Best Male Actor	Raaz	Nominated	
2003	Zee Cine Awards	Dynamic Duo-with Bipasha Basu	Raaz	Won	
2003	Screen Awards	Jodi No. 1 (along with Bipasha Basu)	Raaz	Won	
2003	V Shantaram Film Award	Best actor	Raaz	Won	
2004	Stardust Awards	Superstar of Tomorrow – Male	Sssshhh...	Nominated	
2007	National Youth Icon Award	Best Youth Icon of the Year	—N/a	Honoured	
2021	Showbiz Icon Award	Iconic Health & Fitness Ambassador	—N/a	Honoured	
2022	Indian Television Academy Awards	Best Supporting Actor Drama OTT	The Empire	Won	
2022	IWM Buzz Award	Most Popular Negative Character in a Web Series	The Empire	Won	
2026	Pinkvilla Screen and Style Icons Awards	Best Supporting Actor	The Royals	Won	

== See also ==
- List of Bollywood actors
- List of Indian television actors
- Lists of Indian actors
- Italians in India
