= Sanjay Suri =

Indian actor, producer (b. 1971)

- Born: 6 April 1971 (age 55); Srinagar, Jammu and Kashmir, India
- Occupations: Actor; film producer
- Years active: 1999–present
- Spouse: Ambika Suri (m. 2001)

Sanjay Suri (born 6 April 1971) is an Indian actor and film producer. He had a supporting role in Pyaar Mein Kabhi Kabhi (1999), acted in Jhankaar Beats, and co-produced and acted in I Am.

== Personal life ==
Sanjay Suri was born on 6 April 1971 in Srinagar, in the state of Jammu and Kashmir in an affluent business family of Khatri background. He left Srinagar at the age of 19 during the forced displacement of Kashmiri Hindus when his father was killed by terrorists and his family relocated to Delhi. Suri and his wife Ambika have two children.

== Career ==
Suri appeared in a supporting role in Pyaar Mein Kabhi Kabhi, co-starring with Rinke Khanna and Dino Morea. His next films were Daman: A Victim of Marital Violence (2001), Filhaal... and the musical Dil Vil Pyar Vyar (2002). In 2003 he appeared in Pinjar co-starring Urmila Matondkar. In 2005, he starred in My Brother... Nikhil as an HIV positive homosexual co-starring Juhi Chawla.

Suri co-produced I Am, a production involving crowdsourcing; the movie was released on 29 April 2011 and went on to win the National Film Award for Best Feature Film in Hindi, the David Flint honorary award for promoting human rights, the best in Asian Cinema award (NETPAC) at the international Kerala film festival 2010, and the audience choice award at the Florence River to River festival in 2010. Suri attended the Cannes Film Festival as part of the India contingent in 2012.

== Filmography ==
=== Films ===
Year	Title	Role	Notes
1999	Pyaar Mein Kabhi Kabhi	Bhargav / Bugs	
2000	Tera Jadoo Chal Gayaa	Raj Oberoi	
2001	Daman	Sunil Saikia	
2002	Filhaal	Dhruv Malhotra	
2002	Dil Vil Pyar Vyar	Dev	
2002	Chalo Ishq Ladaaye	Rahul	
2003	Jhankaar Beats	Deep	
2003	Pinjar	Ramchand	
2003	Dhoop	Capt. Rohit S. Kapoor	
2004	Plan	Lucky	
2004	Insaaf: The Justice	IAS Officer Vishwanath Prasad	
2004	Shaadi Ka Laddoo	Som Dutta	
2005	My Brother...Nikhil	Nikhil Kapoor	
2005	Home Delivery	Marriage Man	Special appearance
2006	My Bollywood Bride	Bobby	
2006	Bas Ek Pal	Nikhil Kapoor	
2007	Say Salaam India	Hari Sadu	
2007	Speed	Siddharth	
2008	Sorry Bhai!	Harshvardhan	
2008	Firaaq	Sameer	
2009	Anubhav	Anubhav Malhotra	
2009	Sikandar	Mukhtar Masoodi	
2010	A Flat	Karan	
2011	I Am	Abhimanyu	
2012	Heroine	Abbas Khan	
2012	Ekhon Nedekha Nodir Xhipare	Abhijit Shandilya	Assamese film
2016	Nil Battey Sannata	District Commissioner	
2016	Chauranga	Dhaval	
2016	Shorgul	Mithilesh Yadav	
2017	Hindi Medium	Kabir	Special appearance
2018	My Birthday Song	Rajiv Kaul	
2018	Raazi	Samar Khan	Special appearance
2019	Jhalki	DM Sanjay Bhartiya	
2019	Pareeksha	SP Kailash Anand	ZEE5 film
2020	Call him Eddy	Eddy	Short film
2020	Ateet	Col. Vishwa Karma	ZEE5 film
2023	Once Upon Two Times	Kaushik Awasthi	
2024	The Miranda Brothers	Coach Carter	JioCinema film
2025	Baramulla	Dr. Sharad Sapru	Netflix film
2026	Main Vaapas Aaunga	Jasmer Grewal	

=== Television ===
Year	Title	Role	Notes	Ref.
2026	Juhi Mui	Advocate Rajendra Suri	Cameo	

=== Web series ===
Year	Title	Role	Platform	Notes
2017	Dev DD	Anurag	ALTBalaji series	
2017	Inside Edge	Niranjan Suri	Amazon original series	
2019	Leila	Joshiji	Netflix	
2019	Love, Lust and Confusion Season 2	RC Sir	Viu series	
2019	Bhram	Peter Paul	Web series on ZEE5	
2020	Mentalhood	Anmol Sharma	Web series on ZEE5 and ALTBalaji	
2021	Dev DD Season 2	Anurag	ALTBalaji series	
2022	Avrodh: The Siege Within Season 2	Ehsaan Waziri	SonyLIV series	
2023	Sarvam Shakti Mayam	Madhav Suri	ZEE5 series	
