= Pet Fed India =

Indian pet festival

- Status: Active
- Locations: New Delhi, Mumbai
- Country: India
- Inaugurated: 2014
- Organizer: Mydea Ventures Pvt Ltd
- Website: http://www.petfed.org

Pet Fed is the biggest pet festival held in India, with its main editions held annually at New Delhi, Mumbai and Bengaluru. The first ever edition was organised on 1 November 2014 at Dilli Haat INA in New Delhi.

It has consistently witnessed a footfall of over 60,000+ visitors and 9,000+ pets cumulatively in all cities. Pet Fed also holds the title for ‘Biggest Dog Carnival’ in the Limca Book of Records.

== Pet Fed 2014 ==
=== Delhi Pet Fed 2014 ===
The first-ever Pet Fed was hosted by Mydea Ventures Private Limited on 1 November 2014 at Dilli Haat, New Delhi, India, as a full-day festival for pets and pet lovers. It was organized by three 22-year-old entrepreneurs, Akshay Gupta, Aishwarya Tandon, and Ravdeep Anand.

It showcased stalls by several Indian pet care brands, including but not restricted to, Choostix, Dogspot.in, PetSetGo, Heads Up For Tails, Pets Empire, and many others, and NGOs working for animal welfare like People For Animals.

Pet Fed lasted a day and included several games, interactive sessions, workshops by dog trainers, a fashion show, and more. Around 5,000 people attended the event. This edition was hosted as a non-ticketed event and was open to all.

As traditionally associated with dog shows, several pet parents participated in the fest with their dogs and participated in various activities and games organized for them.

Honourable Union Cabinet Minister for Women and Child Development and avid animal rights activist, Smt also was present at the convention. Maneka Gandhi.

== Pet Fed 2015 ==
=== Kolkata Pet Fed 2015 ===
The first express edition of Pet Fed happened in Kolkata at Science City Kolkata from 28 February to 1 March 2015. The Kolkata express edition saw participation from major pet care brands like Pedigree Petfoods, Himalaya Wellness, Drools, and many more along with non-pet care brands like Daikin.

=== Delhi Pet Fed 2015 ===
The second edition of Pet Fed was held in Delhi on 15 December 2015 at Garden of Five Senses. Like the first edition, Pet Fed 2015 remained a non-ticketed event and saw a record-breaking 9,500 visitors with more than 1,000 dogs. This edition also saw participation from brands like Grofers, T.G.I. Friday's along with all the major pet care brands and even a book launch by the title Fluffy & Me.

== Pet Fed 2016 ==
=== Delhi Pet Fed 2016 ===
The third of Pet Fed India was held in Delhi from 17 to 18 December 2016 at NSIC Grounds. Pet Fed now qualified as a ticketed event and witnessed a huge surge in the turnout - with over 20,000 visitors and more than 2,500 pets flocked in to experience the making of what would soon be India's Biggest Pet Festival. The fest had more than 100 stalls of pet care brands like Royal Canin, Drools, Choostix, Dogspot.in, PetSetGo and many more which showcased their products and services; and several NGOs working for animal welfare.

Many non-pet care brands also showcased their products, like Tata Motors, Mahou-San Miguel Group, Panasonic and more. A dedicated off-leash zone & play area for pets was set up along with dog grooming, a fashion show, training workshops, and more. For the first time, an award ceremony was also conducted to recognize the work of companies and professionals in the pet care industry.

A Guinness World Record for most dogs wearing bandanas was also conducted at this edition of Pet Fed.

== Pet Fed 2017 ==
=== Delhi Pet Fed 2017 ===
The fourth edition of Pet Fed was held on 2–3 December at NSIC Grounds and witnessed a footfall of over 20,000 visitors and 3,000 pets.

There were a plethora of stage activities & shows like Temptation alley, Pet's Got Talent, Fashion Show, Security Dog Show by trained professionals that turned out to be a major hit among the visitors.

More than 120 brands, which are essential to the livelihood of pets and their humans, exhibited their products at the fest. Dogsee Chew, Orijen & Acana were some of the major brands that exhibited their products.

=== Mumbai Pet Fed 2017 ===
Pet Fed's first move to Mumbai happened on 16 & 17 December at MMRDA Grounds. The reception of the event was huge as the event saw 19,000+ humans and 2,500+ pets in attendance.

The excitement was galore with the presence of celebrities like Dino Morea, Ashutosh Gowariker, Chunky Panday & Ananya Panday, Aditya Thakrey, Minissha Lamba, Pooja Chopra who had come with their dogs. Other celebrities like Sidharth Malhotra, Malaika Arora, Karan Kundra & VJ Anusha gave this festival for pets a shout out on their Social Media.

Pet Fed was awarded the Limca Book of records in Mumbai the same year for being the biggest gathering of dogs at an event in India.

== Pet Fed 2018-19 ==
The 2018-19 editions of Pet Fed were all about dedicating those two days to your pets and encouraging people to adopt Indie breeds as pets. There was a huge inclination towards adoption drives, where a lot of Animal Welfare NGOs put up adoption booths. To encourage people with Indie pets, free entry was allowed for people who had Indie breeds as pets. For the rest of the crowd, the event was ticketed as usual.

=== Bengaluru Pet Fed 2018 ===
Pet Fed led its expansion to the city of Bengaluru for the first time in 2018. It was held on 1 & 2 December at Manpho Convention Center, with over 18,000 visitors & 2,500 pets attending the festival on both days.

There was a huge amount of participation and great reception towards various activities like Fashion Show & a Cat Show that was held in association with Alliance of Cat Fanciers & Royal Canin. There were international certified judges for the Cat Show in attendance as well.

Along with pet care brands like Just Dogs (India's biggest retail chain for pets) & Cessna Lifeline, popular beer brand Simba, automobile brand like Volvo, upcoming app-based brand like Dunzo & popular FMCG brand 'Dairy Day' had also participated in the same.

Dino Morea supported the expansion to Bengaluru as the new city, it being his hometown as well.

=== Delhi Pet Fed 2018 ===
The fifth & the biggest edition until date culminated on 15 & 16 December with over 25,000 visitors & 3,500 pets at NSIC Grounds in Okhla. It included a Paramilitary Dog Show organized by the Sashatra Seema Bal (Indian Army).

Over 150 pet care brands participated at the festival, and iguanas also made their first appearance in the Delhi Pet Fed this year.

== Pet Fed 2019-20 ==
The 2019-20 editions of Pet Fed in Bengaluru, Delhi and Mumbai featured dog agility activities, designated play areas for pets, international cat shows held in association with the World Cat Federation, and police dog demonstrations. At the Bengaluru edition in November 2019, the dog play area included trampolines and ball pools. A demonstration by the City Armed Reserve of the Karnataka Police featured a Belgian Malinois. The Delhi edition included a demonstration by the Delhi Police Crime Branch’s dog squad, while the Mumbai edition also featured a security dog show.

=== Bengaluru Pet Fed 2019 ===
Pet Fed organised its second edition in Bangalore on 16 and 17 November at Jayamahal Palace, a much bigger and better venue. This edition witnessed over 19,040 visitors & 3,050 pets attending the festival on both days.

The International Cat Show that was held in association with World Cat Federation & Alliance of Cat Fanciers observed the participation of over 85 cats. Two types of judging took place - Ring Judging by Sudhakar Katikineni and Traditional Judging by world-renowned international judges - Marina Zhuravleva & Olga Belyaeva from Russia.

Over 75 brands participated in the exhibition, and among them, a few popular pet care brands being Purina, Farmina, Himalaya, Lozalo, Heiniger, Just Dogs and other brands like Simba, Greater Than Gin and Isuzu.

One of the major highlights at this Pet Fed was the skillful demonstration by the Karnataka Police Dog Squad. A live demonstration by Belgian Shepherd Malinois dogs was conducted to showcase to the audience how these police dogs safeguard and serve the country each day. The demonstration included tasks like obedience, explosive detection with human body search, narcotic detection with search from bags, and assault or attack work with and without a command.

=== Delhi Pet Fed 2019 ===
The sixth edition: A New Year special edition where pet parents were encouraged to gather at this festival as a tribute to bringing in the new year with their pets - culminated on 28 & 29 December with over 19,580 visitors & 3,104 pets at the NSIC Grounds in Okhla. A large flock of pet parents & pet lovers attended the festival despite Delhi being the coldest in over 100 years.

The Delhi Police Crime branch's dog squad plays a role of paramount importance in Crime Branch's day-to-day work & undertakes various important duties vis a vis Narcotic detection, explosive detection, and solving cases of theft, decoity, and murder, etc. The same was demonstrated by 10 dogs & 22 police officers in front of a large audience.

Over 120 pet care brands participated at the festival, and iguanas reappeared in this edition. The International Cat Show, in association with World Cat Federation was also a major hit with cat parents & cat lovers, with international judges coming in from Russia & Belarus.

=== Mumbai Pet Fed 2020 ===
The third edition in Mumbai was the biggest edition with 20,825 visitors & 3,156 pets in attendance on 11 & 12 January at JVPD Grounds, Juhu.

Apart from Dino Morea, Minnisha Lamba, Kunal Kohli, Omkar Kapoor, Kunwar Amar as well as TV Actors and a real-life couple Siddharth Chandekar & Mitali Mayekar were spotted at the carnival.
