= Godfather (2007 film) =

- Front cover/poster
- Directed by: Hriday Shetty
- Produced by: Aslam Bhatti
- Starring: Vinod Khanna; Meera; Arbaaz Khan; Ajab Gul; Mikaal Zulfiqar
- Music by: Aadesh Shrivastava
- Distributed by: ARY Films
- Release date: 14 October 2007
- Running time: 146 min
- Country: Pakistan
- Language: Urdu

Godfather is a Pakistani Urdu film directed by Hriday Shetty released on 14 October 2007. This film has a cast including both Pakistani and Indian actors. It showed Vinod Khanna for the first time on the Pakistani cinema screen. Further cast included Meera, Arbaaz Khan, Shafqat Cheema, Ajab Gul, and Atiqa Odho. It was produced by Aslam Bhatti. It was distributed ARY Digital.

The film and its characters are inspired by the Godfather film series.

== Plot ==
A thriller focusing on the rise of a group of influential and powerful gangsters. Ali is a shepherd who has shouldered responsibility of fending for his family, including his parents Farid and Faatima, and his younger sister, Nahid. One fateful day he ends up saving Abdullah Khan's (Powerful underworld boss) life. As a result, Abdullah's rival, Khalid eliminates Ali's family brutally. A repentant Abdullah adopts Ali and Nahid. Abdullah's wife, Salima Begum, welcomes Ali and Nahid whole-heartedly. But these youngsters are resented by Shaakir, Abdullah's son, who feels that Ali is getting more attention and love than him. Meanwhile, Ali soon realises that power is everything in this world and so joins Abdullah in his business. Under the love and care of Abdullah he grows to be a heroic but feared force. He may be ruthless in his dealings but always has great compassion. As Ali becomes the new face of Abdullah Khan's vast empire and a champion of the needy, Shaakir becomes more resentful. When Abdullah announces Ali as his heir, Shaakir becomes furious. The conflict between father and son results in Abdullah's death. As the shattered family comes to terms with their loss, an angry Ali warns Shaakir to leave the country. What follows next is a gripping and fast-paced thriller of emotions - love, honesty, loyalty, betrayal - with twists and turns until the final scenes.

== Cast ==
- Vinod Khanna
- Meera
- Mikaal Zulfiqar as Abdullah
- Arbaaz Khan as Shakir Khan
- Ajab Gul
- Shafqat Cheema
- Aslam Bhatti as Ali
- Hrishitaa Bhatt
- Maria Khan
- Atiqa Odho
- Preeti Jhangiani as Abdullah Wife
- Kim Sharma
- Mehmood Akhtar
- Amrita Arora as Guest
- Nafisa Ali
