= Holiday (2006 film) =

- Theatrical poster
- Directed by: Pooja Bhatt
- Produced by: Pooja Bhatt
- Starring: Dino Morea; Onjolee Nair; Kashmera Shah
- Music by: Ranjit Barot
- Release date: 10 February 2006
- Country: India
- Language: Hindi

Holiday is a 2006 Indian romantic dance film produced and directed by Pooja Bhatt and starring Dino Morea, Gulshan Grover and Onjolee Nair. It is a remake of the 1987 American film Dirty Dancing.

== Plot summary ==
Muskaan is a shy, wealthy girl who visits Goa with her family. She meets Dino, a dance performer at the holiday resort in Goa. His dance partner, Alysha, is betrayed by a man who impregnates her, so Muskaan comes to her aid by replacing her in Dino and Alysha's dance routine. As Dino helps her train, love begins to bloom between them and problems arise. Muskaan's father does not approve of their pairing as he believes Dino is the man who impregnated Alysha.

== Cast ==
- Dino Morea as Dino
- Kashmera Shah as Alisa
- Onjolee Nair as Muskaan
- Gulshan Grover as Dr. Daksh Suri, Muskan's Father
- Jabed Ahmed Laskar as ACP Jai Malhotra
- Nauheed Cyrusi as Samara
- Muskan Suri
- Anahita Uberoi as Nandini, Muskan's mother
- Sanjit Bedi
- Munmun Dutta as Shuli
- Ankur Desai
- Pooja Arora
- Yashodhan Bal

== Music ==
Holiday

Soundtrack album by Ranjit Barot
- Released: 1 November 2005
- Genre: Feature film soundtrack
- Label: Saregama

1. Aashiyaan - Shreya Ghoshal, Vijay Prakash, Ranjit Barot, Amit Chatterjee
2. Aashiyaan (Remix) - Shreya Ghoshal, Vijay Prakash, Amit Chatterjee
3. Khwahishon Se - Shreya Ghoshal, Vijay Prakash, Ranjit Barot, Kunal Ganjawala, Nandini Srikar
4. Move With My Body - Dominique Cerejo, Ranjit Barot
5. Neele Neele Aasmaan Tale - Shreya Ghoshal, Vijay Prakash, Nandini Srikar
6. Raqs Kar Ley - Shaan, Vijay Prakash, Nandini Srikar
7. Sound Of The Future - Caralisa Monteiro, Ranjit Barot
8. Tauba - Ranjit Barot
9. Tu Hai Bhatakta Jugnu Koi - Shreya Ghoshal, Vijay Prakash, Nandini Srikar

== Reception ==
Taran Adarsh of IndiaFM gave the film 1.5 out of 5, writing, "On the whole, HOLIDAY doesn't have much to fall back upon except for a soothing musical score. But music alone isn't enough. At the box-office, it's a non-starter!" Merril Diniz of Rediff.com wrote, "Despite its pleasant music, great dancing, picturesque backdrop and a tested storyline, Holiday lacks soul."
