= Mentalhood =

Indian web series

- Promotional poster
- Genre: Drama
- Created by: Ekta Kapoor
- Developed by: Ekta Kapoor; Ritu Bhatia
- Written by: Ritu Bhatia; Suyash Khabya
- Directed by: Karishma Kohli
- Creative directors: Bhavna Rawail; Karishmaa Oluchi; Samir Khurana
- Starring: Karisma Kapoor; Dino Morea; Sanjay Suri
- Composer: Chandan Saxena
- Country of origin: India
- Original language: Hindi
- No. of seasons: 1
- No. of episodes: 10 (list of episodes)

Production
- Producers: Rupali Guha; Pintoo Guha
- Production location: India
- Camera setup: Multi-camera
- Running time: 18-23 minutes
- Production company: Film Farm India

Original release
- Network: ALTBalaji
- Release: 11 March 2020

Mentalhood is an Indian Hindi drama web series produced by Rupali Guha under her banner Film Farm India for the online streaming platform ZEE5 and ALTBalaji. The series marks the web debut of actress Karisma Kapoor and stars Sanjay Suri, Sandhya Mridul, Shilpa Shukla, Shruti Seth and Amrita Puri.

The series revolves around different natures of mothers and showcases how they manoeuvre their way through unreasonable expectations and they try their best to raise their children. The series explores the multitasking nature of different types of mothers and their ways in leading the best upbringing of their children.

== Premise ==
Meira, a multi-tasking mom, tries to find the right balance in parenting and reaches out to other moms through a blog. Get ready to enjoy the topsy-turvy world of mothers and how they manoeuvre their way through unreasonable expectations and eccentricities to raise their children.

== Synopsis ==
Each child of the contestants study at the GI International School. Armed with a unique shade of motherhood, each supermom out of six will compete through ordeals with society, their children and their family, as well as with other moms.

== Cast ==
- Karisma Kapoor as Meira Sharma : Mom of Amyra (13), Nikhil (10) and Arjun (4); Anmol's wife.
- Sanjay Suri as Anmol Sharma : Father of Amyra, Nikhil and Arjun; Meira's husband.
- Dino Morea as Akash : A single Dad of twins (through surrogacy), Naks (Aayush Bhanushali) and Tara (Aayushi Bhanushali) Twins in real life also (4).
- Sandhya Mridul as Anuja Joshi/Ajo : Mom of Mahisha(13) and Atanand (10); Tarun's wife.
- Shilpa Shukla as Namrata Dalmia : Mom of Shyasta (10) through adoption;Kunal's wife.
- Shruti Seth as Diksha Shah : Mom of Nirakar (4); Jigar's ex wife.
- Tillotama Shome as Preeti : Mom of Vicky (14) and Timmy (10); Gaurav's wife.
- Amrita Puri as Anjali Patel
- Nikita Katakwar
- Rohan Joshi as Jigar Shah
- Neeven Ved as ballerina

== Episodes ==
No. overall	No. in season	Title	Directed by	Written by	Original release date
1	1	"Nutrition"	Karishma Kohli	Ritu Bhatia and Suyash Khabya	10 March 2020
2	2	"Bully"	Karishma Kohli	Ritu Bhatia and Suyash Khabya	10 March 2020
3	3	"Gender Bender"	Karishma Kohli	Ritu Bhatia and Suyash Khabya	10 March 2020
4	4	"The Tiger Mom"	Karishma Kohli	Ritu Bhatia and Suyash Khabya	11 March 2020
5	5	"Health is Wealth"	Karishma Kohli	Ritu Bhatia and Suyash Khabya	11 March 2020
6	6	"The Art of Saying No"	Karishma Kohli	Ritu Bhatia and Suyash Khabya	11 March 2020
7	7	"Trust is Overrated"	Karishma Kohli	Ritu Bhatia and Suyash Khabya	11 March 2020
8	8	"Trust II / Imtehaan"	Karishma Kohli	Ritu Bhatia and Suyash Khabya	11 March 2020
9	9	"Good Touch Bad Touch"	Karishma Kohli	Ritu Bhatia and Suyash Khabya	11 March 2020
10	10	"Perfection is a Myth"	Karishma Kohli	Ritu Bhatia and Suyash Khabya	11 March 2020
