= Meeting Se Meeting Tak =

Unreleased Indian film

- Theatrical Poster
- Directed by: Anant Mahadevan
- Written by: Anant Mahadevan
- Produced by: Narendra Bajaj; Shyam Bajaj
- Starring: Dino Morea; Priyanka Sharma
- Music by: Mithoon
- Country: India
- Language: Hindi

Meeting Se Meeting Tak is a Bollywood film starring Dino Morea and Priyanka Sharma in the lead roles. It is written and directed by Anant Mahadevan and produced by Narendra Bajaj and Shyam Bajaj. The film was shot in Dubai and parts of South Africa. This film was supposed to be release in 2008 but due to some unknown reasons this movie was shelved and still being unreleased

== Cast ==
- Dino Morea as Rahul
- Priyanka Sharma as Anjali
- Nauheed Cyrusi
- Milind Soman
- Simone Singh

== Synopsis ==
Anjali (Priyanka Sharma) is a beautiful and idealistic girl from Jhansi who in the middle of meetings, parties, and classes in college, is trying to find her one true love. Is it the oddball Ginger? The professionally ambitious yet unclassy Steve? Or the mysterious guy, Rahul (Dino Morea), who she has only seen in her dreams? Will Anjali find her soulmate, the perfect man for her? Meeting Se Meeting Tak is a witty and sexy take on what it takes to find true love.

== Soundtrack ==
- Sapno ki rani – Roop Kumar Rathod
- Intzaar hai – (KK, Sunidhi Chauhan)
- Jab pyar ho – (Shaan, Shreya Ghoshal)
- Sun kudiye – (Vishal Dadlani, Mamta Sharma)
- Aaj nacho – (Sukhwinder Singh, Mohit Chauhan, Shreya Ghoshal)
