= Kaun Banegi Shikharwati =

Indian Hindi-language comedy-drama original web series on ZEE5

- Genre: Comedy; Drama
- Written by: Ananya Banerjee
- Directed by: Gauravv Chawla; Ananya Banerjee
- Starring: Naseeruddin Shah; Raghubir Yadav; Lara Dutta; Dino Morea; Soha Ali Khan; Kritika Kamra; Anya Singh
- Music by: Anurag Saikia
- Country of origin: India
- Original language: Hindi
- No. of seasons: 1
- No. of episodes: 10 (list of episodes)

Production
- Cinematography: Srijan Chaurasia; Linesh Desai
- Editors: Sudhir Achary; Ninad Khanolkar
- Running time: 30 mins
- Production companies: Applause Entertainment; Emmay Entertainment

Original release
- Release: 7 January 2022

Kaun Banegi Shikharwati is an Indian Hindi-language comedy-drama web series streaming on ZEE5. It is written and directed by Gauravv Chawla and Ananya Banerjee. The series has been produced by Applause Entertainment and Emmay Entertainment. This ten-episode web series was released on 7 January 2022. It stars Naseeruddin Shah, Raghubir Yadav, Lara Dutta, Soha Ali Khan, Kritika Kamra and Anya Singh in the lead roles.

== Plot ==
It is the story of Raja Mrityunjay Singh Shikharwat, who is broke and owes the Indian government a hefty amount of in unpaid property taxes. To come out of this scenario, he fakes sickness and summons his four estranged daughters, Devyani, Gayatri, Kamini, and Uma. He plans to hold a nine-rounds tournament amongst them, each with a job for the princesses to complete. At the end of this tournament, the winner will be crowned Queen.

== Cast ==
- Naseeruddin Shah as Raja Mrityunjay Singh Shikharwat
- Raghubir Yadav as Mishraji
- Lara Dutta as Devyani Shikharwat Goel
- Soha Ali Khan as Gayatri Shikharwat
- Kritika Kamra as Kamini Shikharwat
- Anya Singh as Uma Shikharwat
- Cyrus Sahukar as Harsh Goel
- Varun Thakur as Roop Singh
- Anurag Sinha as Veer Singh
- Norshang Tamang as Dhanur
- Alisha as Padma
- Dino Morea as Rudro
- Sahil Salathia

== Episode list ==
No. overall	No. in season	Title	Directed by	Written by	Original release date
1	1	"Strokes of Genius"	Gauravv Chawla, Ananya Banerjee	Gauravv Chawla, Ananya Banerjee	7 January 2022
After the government's notice, Mishraji devises a plan to reunite King's four estranged daughters, Devyani, Gayatri, Kamini and Uma. The sisters return home and learn about the Navrasa Royal Games.
2	2	"The Game Begins"	Gauravv Chawla, Ananya Banerjee	Gauravv Chawla, Ananya Banerjee	7 January 2022
In the past, the sisters humiliate each other in public and leave the palace. In the present, the Navrasa Royal Games begin, and the sisters face a cooking challenge, but it ends in a bitter squabble.
3	3	"A Common Enemy"	Gauravv Chawla, Ananya Banerjee	Gauravv Chawla, Ananya Banerjee	7 January 2022
The next game is a stage play performance, but Devyani converts it into a roast on the king, and they make embarrassing jokes about him. King feels he can still save his family as his daughters reunite.
4	4	"Fear Is the Key"	Gauravv Chawla, Ananya Banerjee	Gauravv Chawla, Ananya Banerjee	7 January 2022
The king recreates a horror night to unite his daughters with the common fear of darkness. Mishraji urges King to tell the princesses about the tax problem, but he declares the games will continue.
5	5	"Earth, Wind and Fire"	Gauravv Chawla, Ananya Banerjee	Gauravv Chawla, Ananya Banerjee	7 January 2022
The next game is based on the four elements of nature. Kamini faces trouble during the fire round but is rescued by Veer Singh. Devyani's husband Harsh arrives at the palace with their twins.
6	6	"Nightmare?"	Gauravv Chawla, Ananya Banerjee	Gauravv Chawla, Ananya Banerjee	7 January 2022
Kamini reconnects with Uma. At the palace, the sisters perform the queen’s famous Holi pooja in tandem. Meanwhile, tax officials discuss an infamous officer, who has been given a task related to Shikharwati.
7	7	"Heart-Speak"	Gauravv Chawla, Ananya Banerjee	Gauravv Chawla, Ananya Banerjee	7 January 2022
An old man claims that the king owes him money for a job he had done 30 years ago that helped him hide a treasure. Gayatri's confession shocks everyone. Roop Singh's real purpose is revealed.
8	8	"Clue-Less"	Gauravv Chawla, Ananya Banerjee	Gauravv Chawla, Ananya Banerjee	7 January 2022
Roop speculates where King must have hidden the treasure. Kamini wins her first game but is shocked to learn that Veer is leaving for Mewar. Later, she and King have a heart-to-heart conversation.
9	9	"Treasure Hunt"	Gauravv Chawla, Ananya Banerjee	Gauravv Chawla, Ananya Banerjee	7 January 2022
The sisters must face their deepest fears in the next game. King admires his daughters, but the moment is interrupted by an unknown man pointing a gun at the king. Roop decides to raid the palace.
10	10	"All That Glitters Is Not Gold"	Gauravv Chawla, Ananya Banerjee	Gauravv Chawla, Ananya Banerjee	7 January 2022
During the final game, Uma has an allergy attack, following which the sisters unite. Roop Singh arrives with his team to raid the palace, but the king has the last laugh as he announces his decision.

== Release ==
ZEE5 announced the launch of a trailer on 23 December 2021 and the series was released on 7 January 2022.

== Reception ==
=== Critical reviews ===
Archika Khurana of The Times of India has given 3.5/5 stars stating that the series is a fun, breezy take on a dysfunctional royal family. Due to its simple writing and weird characters, it is a fine blend of humour and drama. Do not be fooled by the tracksuit and games; the series is not as gory as ‘Squid Game’, but it is a light-hearted dramedy that will bring a smile to your face.

Saibal Chatterjee of NDTV has given 2.5/5 stars stating that the series is a patchy dramedy. It is a mildly diverting, inoffensive parody of the repercussions of power wielded without responsibility. It does not scale any peak, but it is entertaining enough not to sink into a low work that it cannot find its way out of with a little bit of help from the actors.

Shubham Kulkarni of Koimoi has given 2/5 stars stating that the series is a dramedy about a dysfunctional family that falls prey to repetitiveness and confused tonality. The actor Naseeruddin Shah is prolific, but the character becomes repetitive. All the other actors have made justice to their respective roles. The web series like this with more evolved humour deserved depth too. The bar for dramedies about families raised four decades ago by some prolific filmmakers will struggle to live up to them.
