= Hriday Shetty =

Indian film director

- Occupation: Film director
- Years active: 1992–present
- Father: M. B. Shetty
- Relatives: Rohit Shetty (half-brother)

Hriday Shetty is an Indian film director. He is the son of stuntman M. B. Shetty and the half-brother of film director and producer Rohit Shetty.

== Personal life ==
He was born to Vinodini and veteran actor/stuntman M. B. Shetty (popularly known as Fighter Shetty) who had acted in Hindi and Kannada films.

== Career ==
He started his career as an associate director during Parasmani which released in 1992. His work as a filmmaker includes the films Chaalis Chauraasi, Godfather: The Legend Continues, Pyaar Mein Twist, Daag - Shades of Love, Plan. Chaalis Chauraasi was produced by his brother Uday Shetty.

== Filmography ==
- Chaalis Chauraasi (2012)
- Godfather: The Legend Continues (2007) (Pakistani film)
- Pyaar Mein Twist (2005).
- Daag - Shades of Love (2004)
- Plan (2004)
- Parasmani (1992) (associate director)
