= Gunaah (2002 film) =

- Directed by: Amol Shetge
- Written by: Mahesh Bhatt; Pranay Narayan
- Produced by: Mukesh Bhatt
- Starring: Bipasha Basu; Dino Morea; Irrfan Khan
- Cinematography: Ishwar R. Bidri
- Edited by: Mohammed Rafique
- Music by: Sajid–Wajid; Anand Raj Anand
- Distributed by: Vishesh Films
- Release date: 20 September 2002
- Running time: 135 minutes
- Country: India
- Language: Hindi
- Budget: ₹4 crore
- Box office: ₹7.5 crore

Gunaah (transl. Crime) is a 2002 Indian Hindi-language crime drama film directed by Amol Shetge and written by Mahesh Bhatt. The film stars Bipasha Basu, Dino Morea and Irrfan Khan. The film was released on 20 September 2002. It received mixed reviews from critics and performed averagely at the box-office.

== Plot ==
Police Inspector Prabha Narayan is haunted by the demons of her past. Being the illegitimate daughter of a prostitute, she had a bad childhood, and an incident in her life occurred when she was driven to the point of committing a murder. But now that she is a cop, she believes that she can clear her conscience by reforming a criminal.

Prabha's life is turned topsy-turvy with the entry of Aditya Kashyap, who is a good person at heart but was forced to take the path of crime due to the wrongdoings of the police system. Incidents, which included his father getting urinated on in the police station.

Prabha goes to Aditya's house to nab him but gets distracted when she sees him bathing and looks away. Aditya slips from under her vigilant eyes, and a hasty chase follows. Prabha stays close on the heels of fleeing Aditya. At one point, when she is about to fall off the rooftop, Aditya stops running and extends his hand to save her. This act makes a great impact on Prabha.

Prabha decides to know Aditya's past and find out what prompted him to commit a crime in the first place. She decides to reform him, but she gets reformed herself and falls in love in the process. Eventually, Prabha and Aditya fall in love. This continues with them being passionate towards each other. Then, a problem arises when Aditya escapes from jail and starts killing people again. Prabha being a good officer kills him when he is about to kill Police Inspector Digvijay Pandey. She gets a gold medal for killing him and keeps the medal in front of his old fireman helmet, saying she loved him and a part of him will always live inside her.

== Cast ==
- Dino Morea as Aditya Kashyap
- Bipasha Basu as Inspector Prabha Narayan
- Irrfan Khan as ACP Digvijay Pandey
- Ashutosh Rana as Ex-Havaldar Madhusudan Gokhale "Uncle"
- Avtar Gill as Dr Mahesh Mirchandani
- Vishwajeet Pradhan as Satyakam Kashyap, Aditya’s father .
- Yashpal Sharma as Parshuram

== Soundtrack ==
Gunaah

Soundtrack album by Sajid-Wajid and Anand Raaj Anand
- Released: 2002
- Genre: Feature film soundtrack
- Label: Sony Music India

The soundtrack was composed by Sajid–Wajid and Anand Raj Anand. The soundtrack had 6 songs. The songs were very popular upon release.

Song	Lyricist	Artist(s)	Music
"Dil Ne Kaha"	Faaiz Anwar	Sonu Nigam	Sajid–Wajid
"Hamne Tumko Dil Ye De Diya"	Praveen Bhardwaj	Alka Yagnik, Babul Supriyo	Anand Raj Anand
"Jab Dil Churaya"	Praveen Bhardwaj	Alka Yagnik, Babul Supriyo	Anand Raj Anand
"Mere Dil Pe Kisine"	Anand Bakshi	Sonu Nigam, Alka Yagnik	Sajid–Wajid
"Rooth Kar Hum"	Anand Bakshi	Roop Kumar Rathod, Sabri Brothers	Sajid–Wajid
"Sajana Saajna"	Praveen Bhardwaj	Alka Yagnik, Abhijeet Bhattacharya	Anand Raj Anand
"Theme of Gunaah"		Sunidhi Chauhan	Anand Raj Anand

== Reception ==
Ronjita Kulkarni from Rediff.com praised Irrfan Khan's performance, felt the film lost steam in the second half, criticized the dialogues, and found the music to be intrusive and at times silly.
