= Monte Carlo Fashions Limited =

Indian retail clothing chain

Monte Carlo Fashions Limited (MCFL)
- Type: Public
- Traded as: BSE: 538836; NSE: MONTECARLO
- ISIN: INE950M01013
- Industry: Clothing
- Founded: 1984; 42 years ago
- Headquarters: Ludhiana, Punjab, India
- Number of locations: 4000+ stores
- Key people: Jawahar Lal Oswal (Chairman); Sandeep Jain (Executive Director); Rishabh Oswal (Executive Director); Raj Kapoor Sharma (CFO)
- Products: Apparel, Athleisure, Home Textiles, Accessories
- Website: montecarlo.in

Monte Carlo Fashions Limited (MCFL), commonly known as Monte Carlo, is an Indian clothing company headquartered in Ludhiana, Punjab that engages in manufacture and trade of the premium and mid-premium wool and cotton, cotton blended, knitted, and woven apparels in India and internationally under the umbrella brand “Monte Carlo”.

Monte Carlo original logo

== Origins ==
The origins of Monte Carlo Fashions Limited trace back to the founding of the Nahar Group in 1949 by Mr. Vidya Sagar Oswal in Ludhiana, Punjab. Operating under the flagship entity Oswal Woollen Mills (OWM), the company initially specialized in hosiery and textile fabrics before identifying a major opportunity in the domestic readymade knitwear market. This led to a strategic expansion in 1972 with the establishment of a dedicated wool combing unit, which provided the technical expertise necessary for the eventual launch of Monte Carlo in 1984. Conceived as a premium brand for woollen winter wear, Monte Carlo quickly gained widespread recognition for its quality and was eventually honoured as a "Superbrand" in India.

== Brand growth ==
By the late 1990s, the brand transitioned from a winter-only label into a comprehensive, all-season fashion destination by entering the cotton segment and diversifying its catalogue to include shirts, trousers, and activewear. The brand's retail strategy evolved significantly with the opening of its first exclusive retail outlet in 2005, followed by rapid expansion that reached a milestone of 100 showrooms across India by 2009. To streamline operations and capitalize on its growing market dominance, the readymade garment business was officially demerged from OWM into a separate corporate entity, Monte Carlo Fashions Limited, during the 2011-12 fiscal year. Under the continued leadership of Chairman Mr. Jawahar Lal Oswal, the company has grown into an industrial powerhouse, currently maintaining over 50% market share in the branded woollen segment and a massive retail footprint of more than 460 exclusive brand outlets and 1,200 multi-brand outlets.

== Corporate evolution ==
MCFL was incorporated in 2008 and subsequently de-merged from OWM in 2011. In June 2012, Samara Capital acquired a minority stake or $32 million, with plans to exit through an eventual IPO. The company launched its initial public offering (IPO) in 2014 and was listed on the Bombay Stock Exchange (BSE) and National Stock Exchange (NSE) in 2015.

== United companies ==
The Nahar group stands as a collective of specialized entities, including:

- Oswal Woollen Mills Ltd.
- Monte Carlo Fashions Ltd.
- Nahar Spinning Mills Ltd.
- Nahar Industrial Enterprises Ltd.
- Nahar Poly Films Ltd.
- Nahar Capital and Financial Services Ltd.

== Sub brands and Collections ==
In addition to woolen clothing, Monte Carlo offers several other product lines:

Rock.it, launched in 2017, is an athleisure and activewear sub-brand offering performance wear including track pants, polo T-shirts, and shorts, developed to cater to India's growing fitness and active lifestyle market. In 2019, the brand signed West Indies cricketer Andre Russell as its brand ambassador, with Russell serving as the face of the brand's multi-channel marketing campaigns in India.

Luxuria is a premium line featuring fabrics that are water, stain, and odour resistant, targeting upper-end consumers within the brand's range.

Cloak & Decker is a casualwear sub-brand focused on everyday menswear including T-shirts, lowers, and streetwear staples.

Monte Carlo Home is the company's home textiles line covering bed sheets, mink blankets, comforters, pillow covers, and towels. The sub-brand was officially launched in 2023 with Bollywood actress Raveena Tandon as its brand ambassador, with the association aimed at positioning Monte Carlo Home as a premium player in India's home decor and lifestyle segment.

Under the flagship Monte Carlo brand, the company offers apparel for men, women, and a dedicated tweens range for children aged 8 to 14 years.

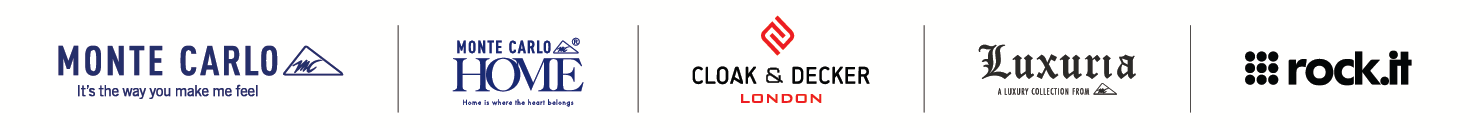

== Distribution Network and Stores ==
Monte Carlo operates one of India's most extensive apparel retail networks. As of FY26, the company's distribution footprint comprises 496 Exclusive Brand Outlets (EBOs), 1,268 Multi-Brand Outlets (MBOs), 659 National Chain Store (NCS) locations, and 593 Shop-in-Shops (SIS). EBOs are split between 163 company-owned and operated (COCO) stores and 333 franchisee-owned and operated (FOFO) outlets. The EBO network has grown steadily from 356 stores in FY23, with the company targeting 40–45 new EBO openings annually, with a strategic focus on western and southern India. The company's highest store concentration is in the northern states, with Uttar Pradesh (63), Punjab (59), Rajasthan (59), and Haryana (47) accounting for its densest retail footprint. National Chain Store partnerships include Shoppers Stop, Pantaloons, Reliance Trends, Lifestyle, LuLu, Globus, and Tata CLiQ Fashion, among others.

In addition to its physical retail presence, Monte Carlo sells through major e-commerce platforms including Amazon, Flipkart, Myntra, Ajio, Snapdeal, and Paytm, as well as through its own branded websites for the Monte Carlo and Rock.it labels. The company has also expanded into quick commerce, partnering with Blinkit, Swiggy Instamart, and Zepto for 30-minute deliveries.

== Manufacturing ==
Monte Carlo operates two manufacturing facilities in Ludhiana, Punjab. An in-house team of over 26 designers creates more than 900 fresh styles every month. The manufacturing units utilize fully automated, specialized machinery and whole garment manufacturing technology to ensure precision and seamless fit.

== Financials ==
Monte Carlo Fashions Limited reported revenue of INR 1,490 Mn for Q1-FY27. Operating EBITDA stood at INR 129 Mn, with an EBITDA margin of 8.66%. Profit after tax (PAT) for FY26 was INR 235 Mn, with a PAT margin of 15.77%.

The company’s product portfolio includes woolen apparel, cotton apparel, home textiles, kids wear, and footwear. In FY26, cotton products contributed 55.1% of total segment sales, followed by woolen products at 27.7%, home textiles at 10.2%, kids wear at 5.9%, and footwear at 1.1%.

== New Projects ==
In January 2026, Monte Carlo Fashions incorporated MCFL Energy Projects Private Limited as a wholly owned subsidiary focused on renewable energy and solar power projects. The subsidiary was established following the company’s receipt of Letters of Award (LOAs) from Madhya Pradesh Urja Vikas Nigam Limited (MPUVNL) for the development of 35 MW AC solar photovoltaic power plants in Madhya Pradesh under the Government of India’s PM KUSUM-C scheme, a programme aimed at solarisation of agricultural feeders and promotion of renewable energy infrastructure. According to the company’s regulatory filing, MCFL Energy Projects was incorporated to undertake activities related to solar power generation, execution of solar photovoltaic projects, and renewable energy infrastructure development under government schemes.

MCFL Energy Projects was incorporated in Punjab with its registered office in Ludhiana. Directors associated with the company included Rishabh Oswal, Ruchika Oswal, Monica Oswal and Sandeep Jain. In May 2026, Monte Carlo Fashions approved an additional investment of up to ₹50 lakh in MCFL Energy Projects.

== Sponsorships, Partnerships and Collaborations ==
In 2025, Soorma Hockey partnered with Rock.It, Monte Carlo's athleisure-focused initiative to promote fitness-oriented fashion and athlete performance.

Monte Carlo has also been associated with the films Barfi!, Student of the Year, Saaho, Mary Kom, and Bhaag Milkha Bhaag through promotional tie-ins.
