= Calida =

Swiss underwear manufacturer

- Formerly: Strickwarenfabrik Sursee AG
- Traded as: SIX: CALN
- Industry: Clothing
- Founded: 1858
- Founder: Heinrich Hauser
- Headquarters: Sursee, Switzerland
- Products: Underwear
- Revenue: CHF 215.9 million (2025)
- Number of employees: 1,810 (2026)
- Website: calidagroup.com

Calida is a Swiss underwear manufacturer based in Sursee. It goes back to a fulling mill and a silk-throwing mill set up in 1858 in Münigen, in the municipality of Sursee. The brand name Calida was introduced in 1929, and the company took the name Calida AG in 1946.

== History ==
Calida's premises in Sursee, aerial photograph by Werner Friedli, 1967

In 1858 Heinrich Hauser from Richterswil set up a cloth fulling mill and a silk-throwing mill in Münigen, in the municipality of Sursee. After his death the business passed into the ownership of Hauser AG and expanded to Oberkirch. In 1911 the company passed to Rüegger & Cie., and in 1924 to Viktor Klaus-Wildi. The brand name Calida was introduced in 1929. In 1941 the company was converted into the Strickwarenfabrik Sursee AG ("Sursee knitwear factory"), whose majority shareholder was Max Kellenberger, and in 1946 it was renamed Calida AG.

After Klaus-Wildi's death in 1947, the company passed to the Kellenberger family and the Palmers family of Vienna. It then came into the full ownership of Calida Holding AG in Sursee, in which the two families held 67% of the share capital; the Kellenberger family held the majority with 51%.

Calida, the country's largest underwear manufacturer, produced women's, men's, and children's underwear in Switzerland, India, and Hungary. In 1999 the company employed about 1,400 people, about 500 of them in Switzerland. Its sales amounted to around 195 million francs, and its main markets were Switzerland and Germany.

== Bibliography ==
- M. Schnieper, "Calida-Pyjamas von damals", in Lasst hören aus neuer Zeit, exhibition catalog, Sempach, 1986, 93–104
