= IIFA (disambiguation) =

IIFA refers to the International Indian Film Academy, an organization for professionals in the Hindi language film industry.

IIFA may also refer to:

- Independent Indoor Football Alliance, American indoor football league based in the state of Texas
- International Islamic Fiqh Academy, international Islamic institution for the advanced study of Islamic jurisprudence and law based in Jeddah
