= Insaaf: The Justice =

- Directed by: Shrey Shrivastav
- Screenplay by: Anant Balani; Chintan Mokashi
- Story by: Chintan Mokashi
- Produced by: Mohammed Fasih
- Starring: Dino Morea; Sanjay Suri; Namrata Shirodkar
- Cinematography: Najeeb Khan
- Edited by: Bibhuti Bhushan
- Music by: Nikhil-Vinay
- Production company: Showman International
- Release date: 5 March 2004
- Country: India
- Language: Hindi

Insaaf: The Justice is a 2004 Hindi drama film directed by Shrey Shrivastav and produced by Mohammed Fasih. The film features Dino Morea, Sanjay Suri and Namrata Shirodkar as main characters and Rajpal Yadav in a supporting role.

== Plot ==
Vishwanath Prasad is an Indian Administrative Service officer and lives in Bombay with his wife, Kunti, and a daughter, Sanaa. One night when he returns home, his wife tells him that she has been sexually assaulted and names the culprit as one Bunty. Vishwanath is angered at this outrage and speaks to a senior police officer, who initially offers all help to prosecute Bunty. But when the senior police officer finds out that Bunty is really Narendra Verma, the son of Home Minister Rameshwari, he backs off and tells Vishwanath he cannot do anything. Vishwanath then goes to the nearest police station to lodge a F.I.R. (First Information Report); however, Police Inspector Brij Bhushan refuses to write it. When the Governor refuses to meet with him, he telephones the State Chief Minister Chandramohan, who invites him to his house the very next day. The next day, at the Chief Minister's residence, he finds Rameshwari and Bunty also present there. Chandramohan asks Bunty to apologize, but Vishwanath is not satisfied, as he wants Bunty to be criminally prosecuted. Then Bunty's goons take over and start terrorizing Vishwanath and his family. Frustrated, Vishwanath kills himself. His suicide case is turned over to the Central Bureau of Investigation and assigned to Officers Pradhan and Abhimanyu Singh. Shortly thereafter, Bunty and Rameshwari are arrested, charged, and the matter is brought to court. The court dismisses the case, and Bunty and his mom are set free. Subsequently, Abhimanyu's girlfriend, Reena, gets more evidence, the case is reopened, and a warrant is issued for Bunty and his mom's arrest. It is here that the young and naive Abhimanyu will find how hard it is for justice to prevail, especially when the suspect is the son of an influential Home Minister, and that politics does rule above everything else.

== Cast ==
- Dino Morea as IPS officer Abhimanyu Singh
- Sanjay Suri as IAS Officer Vishwanath Prasad
- Namrata Shirodkar as Mrs. Kunti Vishwanath Prasad
- Henna as Reena
- Rajpal Yadav as Kailu
- Tej Sapru as Inspector Brij Bhushan
- Mohan Joshi as CBI Officer Pradhan
- Shri Vallabh Vyas as Chief Minister Chandramohan
- Varun Vardhan as Yogi, Social Worker
- Dayal Shankra as Narendra 'Bunty' Verma
- Kunickaa Sadanand as Minister Rameshwari Verma
- Amitabh Bachchan as Narrator

== Music ==
Insaaf: The Justice

Soundtrack album by Nikhil–Vinay
- Released: 2003
- Genre: Feature film soundtrack
- Label: T-Series

The music of the film was composed by Nikhil-Vinay and the lyrics were written by Sameer.

#	Title	Singer(s)
1	"Chane Ke Khet Mein"	Jaspinder Narula, Sapna Awasthi
2	"Chunri Lehrai Toh"	Udit Narayan, Alka Yagnik
3	"Dekha Hai Maine Toh"	Udit Narayan, Anuradha Paudwal
4	"Nazar Ka Milana"	Udit Narayan, Anuradha Paudwal
5	"Tujhe Pyar Itnai"	Sonu Nigam, Anuradha Paudwal
6	"Tumse Milna"	Anuradha Paudwal, Udit Narayan

== Reception ==
Taran Adarsh of IndiaFM gave the film 1 out of 5, writing, "On the whole, INSAAF - THE JUSTICE is a complete letdown. At the box-office, it just won't work! " Sukanya Verma of Rediff.com wrote, "The first half of Insaaf is tense, while the second is full of boring songs picturised in pretty locations. If the film's intention is to preach, it backfires. If it wishes to bring about an awakening, it fails." Manish Gajjar of BBC.com wrote that "the film lacks originality. It's yet another Bollywood film where the lead star takes the law into her hands to seek revenge. The whole film is predictable. We know what's going to happen next. In addition, the rape scene - at about five minutes - goes on way longer than necessary. A scene a fraction of the length would have provided the necessary impact."
