= Baaz: A Bird in Danger =

- Theatrical release poster
- Directed by: Tinu Verma
- Written by: Shyam Goel
- Produced by: Tinu Verma
- Starring: Suniel Shetty; Jackie Shroff; Karishma Kapoor; Dino Morea; Preeti Jhangiani
- Cinematography: Raju Kaygee
- Edited by: Keshav Naidu
- Music by: Ismail Darbar
- Distributed by: Kapishek Films
- Release date: 7 February 2003
- Running time: 176 mins
- Country: India
- Language: Hindi
- Budget: ₹6.2 crore
- Box office: ₹4.8 crore

Baaz: A Bird in Danger (English:- Falcon: A Bird in Danger) is 2003 Indian Hindi-language psychological thriller film directed by Tinnu Verma, starring Suniel Shetty, Jackie Shroff, Karishma Kapoor, Dino Morea and Preeti Jhangiani.

== Plot ==
The film opens with the life of a child born with a strange disorder where he tends to destroy anything that fascinates him. His father had committed suicide and his mother is declared mentally ill. The doctors diagnose that he has inherited this condition genetically. He would be looked after by his grandmother.

Then the film moves to Nainital 17 years later, where Neha Chopra from Delhi comes to Nainital to work as an interior designer for Jai Singh Dabral, the city Mayor who is also a womaniser and attracted to Neha, at one of his secluded and deserted mansions. A serial killer is said to be on the prowl in the city, killing beautiful women ruthlessly and who is always eluding the police, getting away from the law without evidence if at all he gets arrested. Neha soon meets Raj Singh, a loafer whom everyone in the city seems to avoid as he is the suspected serial killer, but she likes him, and soon both fall in love. The city police commissioner Harshvardhan Bhatti and subordinate Preeti Rastogi observe the movements of the couple all over the city, and soon they call Neha and warn her that Raj is a serial killer and she must help them nab him red handed as she is soon going to be his next victim. Neha refuses to believe, especially because Raj saves her life on one occasion. But later she finds items of murder in Raj's house, and thinks Raj is the killer. Brokenhearted, she then decides to leave Nainital for good, much against Dabral's wishes, but Harshvardhan Bhatti and Preeti convince her to stay back and nab Raj red handed.

Raj goes to meet Neha but sees that she is very dull, knowing that something is wrong. Soon one of the killer's victim's sister comes out of coma and tells Preeti that she can identify the killer. Preeti informs Harshvardhan Bhatti, but when they both arrive at the house, the comatose girl dies of shock unexpectedly. Later that night Preeti thinks over everything, and goes to question Harshvardhan. Dabral notices her racing in her car somewhere at night. The next day, Preeti is found murdered in Raj's house. Raj is chased by Harshvardhan Bhatti and the cops until he jumps off a waterfall and seeks shelter in Neha's house.

Dabral threatens to demote Harshvardhan if he does not nab the killer in 24 hours, to which the latter replies assertively. Harshvardhan gives a mobile phone to Neha, telling her that if Raj calls on her, she must dial his number and inform him immediately. Raj does go to Neha to explain his situation but she pushes him off and dials Harshvardhan. Surprisingly, Harshvardhan Bhatti does not answer the phone. She then leaves a voice message saying that Raj has come to kill her. Raj accidentally hits during the argument Neha and she falls unconscious.

Then the movie reaches its climax where Harshvardhan Bhatti appears on the scene. He takes Raj and the unconscious Neha to a temple where Raj and Neha had been before and chains him there. Here Harshvardhan Bhatti reveals himself as the serial killer terrorizing the town. He is the child with the strange disorder shown in the beginning of the movie. He was neglected by his peers due to his disorder and was never able to make any friends. He used to share all his sorrows with his mother during his visits to the mental asylum where she was being treated. Upon seein her son in pain, she told him to “make his own world” since people didn’t want him in theirs, thus triggering his killing spree.

Harshvardhan admits to committing all the murders and hiding the bodies in an underground lair. He also admits to murdering Preeti because she had found out the truth, told everything she knew to his grandmother, and had also stumbled upon his underground lair. It is also revealed that Harshvardhan never had any feelings for Preeti, although she was madly in love with him and was hoping he would reciprocate. He goes on to say that he has always searched for someone to love since he was a child and his search ended when he saw Neha for the first time and will take her by any means necessary.

He was the one who also framed Raj by placing the items of murder in his house. He says "Kaam mera, naam tera", meaning that the crime is his and the name will be of Raj. He does so by recording Neha's voice message stating that Raj is the killer, and as a result Raj will be convicted. Harshvardhan then takes Neha to his underground enclosure to kill her, where the bodies of all his previous victims are found to be kept in glass boxes, as though it were a park.

In the meantime, Dabral comes and frees Raj, and both of them attack him at his house. A huge fight ensues between the three of them and suddenly, Harshvardhan Bhatti's grandmother appears on the scene out of nowhere and shoots him multiple times.

The film ends with Raj and Neha planning to get married, and Dabral giving the deserted house for them to live in.

== Cast ==
- Jackie Shroff as Jai Singh Dabral
- Suniel Shetty as Harshvardhan Bhatti
- Karishma Kapoor as Neha Chopra
- Dino Morea as Raj Singh
- Preeti Jhangiani as Inspector Preeti Rastogi
- Aditi Govitrikar as Winner of the beauty contest
- Razak Khan as Nathuram Nada
- Vivek Shauq as Constable Chautala
- Suresh Bhagwat as Tiwari Anand
- Antara Biswas as Naina Kohli
- Suhasini Mulay as Harshvardhan Bhatti's grandmother

== Soundtrack ==
#	Title	Singer(s)
1	"Chehre Pe"	Shaan, Sukhwinder Singh, Sadhana Sargam
2	"Aye Subah" (Duet)	Roop Kumar Rathod, Sadhana Sargam
3	"Aye Subah" (Female)	Sadhana Sargam
4	"Sannate Mein" (Female)	Sunidhi Chauhan
5	"Sannate Mein" (Male)	Kunal Ganjawala, Vijay Prakash, Harmony By, Clinton
6	"Are Are Jala Koi"	Sunidhi Chauhan
7	"Are Are Jala Koi" (duet)	Kailash Kher, Sunidhi Chauhan
8	"Tujhe Pa Ke Khush Hain Hum"	Kavita Krishnamurthy, Mohammed Salamat
9	"Yeh Jo Ajab Si Duniya Hai"	Sunidhi Chauhan

== Reception ==
Priya Ganapati of Rediff.com called it " a thriller without attitude," She further wrote that "its down market look, lack of attitude, bad music, poor climax and holes in the plot are big turnoffs." Manish Gajjar of BBC.com wrote, "Overall the film falters in various parts as the director tries to pay too much attention to the negative sides of the characters in order to keep the audience guessing."
