= Pyaar Mein Kabhi Kabhi =

1999 Indian Hindi film by Raj Kaushal

- Directed by: Raj Kaushal
- Written by: Patrick Biswas; Shailendra Singh
- Produced by: Tyger Productions; Shailendra Singh
- Starring: Rinke Khanna; Dino Morea; Sanjay Suri
- Cinematography: Rajiv Jain
- Music by: Songs: Vishal Dadlani; Shekhar Ravjiani; Samrat; Shiraz Bhattacharya; Salim–Sulaiman; Background Score: Salim–Sulaiman
- Production company: Tyger Productions
- Distributed by: Sony Pictures Entertainment India
- Release date: 25 June 1999
- Running time: 173 mins
- Country: India
- Language: Hindi

Pyaar Mein Kabhi Kabhi (transl. Sometimes in Love) is a 1999 Indian Hindi-language musical romance film directed by Raj Kaushal. The film stars debutants Rinke Khanna, Dino Morea and Sanjay Suri. The film is set against the backdrop of a Performing Arts College. The film was written by Shailendra Singh and is the first release of his production house, Percept Picture Company.

== Plot ==
The film revolves around a group of talented friends, whose lives undergo a complete change with the arrival of a new student – Khushi. The friends are Siddhant, Bhargav or Bugs, Ronnie, Radha, Ruby and Manoj Dhanwani also known as ‘Haklu’ because he stammers a lot. They all are the young and vibrant students of the National Institute of Performing Arts. Khushi brings a lot of happiness into their lives and as the days pass by, both Sid and Bugs fall in love with her. But Khushi loves Sid. Sid is driven by a burning ambition of becoming a singer. He throws friendship aside for a desirable woman (Roxy), who he believes, is his stepping stone to success.

He dreams of becoming the greatest pop singer and performing with Roxy. But nothing stops them (Sid and Khushi) from coming closer and closer each day. Bugs finds himself falling deeply in love with Khushi, but is forced to keep it a secret that only he can treasure. He takes Khushi on a day-long romantic date. Khushi, broken by Sid's falling for another woman, returns to her comfortable yet lonely existence, the very home that she left to find genuine love and lasting friendships. Emotional upheavals also haunt the rest of the group when a close colleague develops AIDS.

== Cast ==
- Dino Morea as Siddhant
- Rinke Khanna as Khushi
- Sanjay Suri as Baksh Bhargav/Bugs
- Shweta Salve as Radha
- Akashdeep Saigal as Ronnie
- Mohan Kapoor
- Akash Karnataki as KS
- Melody Decunha as Ruby
- Manoj Dhanwani as Hari/Haklu
- Tora Khasgir as Roxy
- Tarun Arora

== Soundtrack ==
Pyaar Mein Kabhi Kabhi

Soundtrack album by Salim–Sulaiman Shekhar Ravjiani Vishal–Shiraz–Samrat
- Released: 3 February 1999
- Genre: Feature film soundtrack
- Label: Sony Music India

The song "Musu Musu Haasi Deu" by The Himalayans was reused in this film. Shaan made his debut as a singer with this film. Childhood friends Vishal Dadlani and Shekhar Ravjiani separately composed songs for the film and coincidentally met in a studio where they decided to form the music director duo Vishal-Shekhar.

#	Title	Lyrics	Music	Singer(s)
1	"Woh Pehli Baar"	Raj Kaushal and Vishal Dadlani	Vishal Dadlani, Shiraz Bhattacharya, Samrat	Shaan
2	"Tumne Na Humse"	Patrick Biswas	Shekhar Ravjiani	Mahalakshmi Iyer
3	"Dil Se Mere"	Mandira Bedi and Raj Kaushal	Shekhar Ravjiani	Shekhar Ravjiani, Mahalakshmi Iyer
4	"Musu Musu Haasi Deu"	Raj Kaushal and Vishal Dadlani	Vishal Dadlani, Shiraz Bhattacharya, Samrat	Shaan
5	"Lakhon Deewane"	Raj Kaushal and Vishal Dadlani	Vishal Dadlani, Shiraz Bhattacharya, Samrat	KK
6	"Koi Toh Mujhe Baata De"	Raj Kaushal and Salim Merchant	Salim–Sulaiman	KK, Jeanne Michael, Salim Merchant
7	"Hum Naujawan Hai"	Raj Kaushal and Vishal Dadlani	Vishal Dadlani, Shiraz Bhattacharya, Samrat	Vishal Dadlani, Manohar, Suraj Jagan
8	"Pyar Mein Kabhi Kabhi"	Vishal Dadlani	Shekhar Ravjiani, Vishal Dadlani	KK

== Reception ==
Vasanthi Hariprakash of The New Indian Express opined that "The director deals with no issue in full, whether it is the trauma of an AIDS-afflicted person or the hopes of a wannabe, leaving the audience absolutely unmoved. The songs, especially the chart-buster Musu Musu, are highly hummable, but they don’t really gel with the movie". Sharmila Taliculam of Rediff.com wrote ″Pyar Mein Kabhi Kabhi may have had something to it if it had a story, a strong script, and not just dabbled in sentimental tripe. But it still has tried to maintain a youthful feel throughout. But while the cast is on a feel good trip, the audience slowly stops smiling and look forward to the arrival of some maturity.″

== Awards ==
- Zee Cine Award – Best Female Debut – Rinkie Khanna
