= Chehraa =

2005 film directed by Saurabh Shukla

- Directed by: Saurabh Shukla
- Produced by: Dilkush Joshi
- Starring: Bipasha Basu; Dino Morea; Preeti Jhangiani; Irrfan Khan; Ayub Khan
- Cinematography: Fuwad Khan
- Edited by: Aarif Sheikh
- Music by: Anu Malik; Nikhil-Vinay
- Release date: 18 February 2005
- Running time: 136 minutes
- Country: India
- Language: Hindi
- Budget: ₹4 crore
- Box office: ₹0.6 crore

Chehraa (English: Face), is a 2005 Indian Hindi-language thriller film directed by Saurabh Shukla, starring Bipasha Basu, Dino Morea, Preeti Jhangiani and Irrfan Khan. It was released on 18 February 2005 and bombed at the box office.

== Plot ==
Reena (Preeti Jhangiani) and fellow colleague Akash Mehta (Dino Morea) are medical (psychiatry) students. They are sweethearts and hope to marry after completing their education. Before that could happen, Megha Joshi (Bipasha Basu) enters their lives and changes everything. For Akash falls head over heels in love with her and will do anything for her. Just when their education is about to get over, Megha disappears from Akash's life for the spectacular task of killing her father to save her mentally challenged mother.

Meanwhile, Aakash becomes a psychiatrist with Reena in the same hospital. Five years later, Megha is admitted to the psychiatric ward of the same hospital in a very disturbed condition. She is unable to recall anything except her last day with Akash, when both had planned to marry each other. Watch how Akash comes to terms with his lost love and promises to do his best to unravel the mystery that is Megha and her equally mysterious disappearance and her sudden re-appearance in his life. Megha is married to Chandranath Diwan (Irrfan Khan), a very rich drug addict. Megha claims she gets threatening calls and that somebody is trying to kill her.

== Soundtrack ==
Chehraa

Soundtrack album by Anu Malik Nikhil-Vinay Ram Sampath
- Released: 28 August 2004
- Genre: Feature film soundtrack
- Label: T-Series

#	Title	Singer(s)	Lyrics	Music	Length
1	"Mausam Ki Izazat Hai"	Shreya Ghoshal, Kunal Ganjawala	Sameer Anjaan	Nikhil-Vinay	6:36
2	"Kabhi Khamosh Baithogi"	Mahalakshmi Iyer, Babul Supriyo	Rahat Indori	Anu Malik	7:14
3	"Hadh Se Jyada Sanam"	Sonu Nigam, Shreya Ghoshal	Deepak Sneh	Naresh Sharma	5:51
4	"Teri Bahon Mein"	Sonu Nigam, Shreya Ghoshal	Sameer	Ram Sampath	5:12
5	"Chillake Chillake"	Viva	Sanjay Chhel	Anu Malik	6:17
6	"Khushboo Khayal Hoon"	Alka Yagnik	Zameer Kazmi	Anu Malik	7:07
7	"Tabahee Tabahee"	Alisha Chinai	Dev Kohli	Anu Malik	6:04
8	"Chillake Chillake" (remix)	Viva	Sanjay Chhel	Anu Malik	4:48

== Reception ==
Rediff.com gave a scathing review of the film, calling it "a drag" and "a waste of time". Likewise, Taran Adarsh of IndiaFM labelled it "a weak fare with poor prospects".
