= Aksar =

2006 Indian film by Anant Mahadevan

- Film poster
- Directed by: Anant Mahadevan
- Screenplay by: Anant Mahadevan
- Dialogue by: Abbas Hierapurwala
- Produced by: Narendra Bajaj; Shyam Bajaj
- Starring: Dino Morea; Emraan Hashmi; Udita Goswami
- Cinematography: K. Rajkumar
- Edited by: Sanjib Dutta
- Music by: Himesh Reshammiya
- Production company: Siddhi Vinayak Creations
- Distributed by: Siddhi Vinayak Creations; Venus Worldwide Entertainment
- Release date: 3 February 2006
- Running time: 132 minutes
- Country: India
- Language: Hindi

Aksar (transl. Often) is a 2006 Indian Hindi-language erotic thriller film directed by Anant Mahadevan and produced by Narendra and Shyam Bajaj under the banner of Siddhi Vinayak Creations. The film stars Dino Morea, Emraan Hashmi and Udita Goswami. Released on 3 February 2006, the film was a moderate box-office success.

A spiritual sequel titled Aksar 2 was released on 17 November 2017.

== Plot ==
Ricky, a playboy, is a leading fashion photographer who wears his heart on his sleeve. One day, he receives a call from Sheena, who asks him to meet her. Once there, the two argue about Sheena's friend Nisha, who was left heartbroken and contemplating suicide after being dumped by Ricky.

Three years later, Ricky is about to hold a photography exhibition when an unknown investor walks in and buys all the pieces before they can be displayed. The billionaire investor, Rajveer (Raj), says that the sale will be completed with one condition: Ricky must seduce and sleep with Raj's wife Sheena. Ricky is perplexed, and Raj explains that he wants to leave Sheena without having to give her half of his wealth, which can only be achieved if she chooses to divorce him.

After some setbacks, Sheena and Ricky begin a relationship according to plan. Raj catches Ricky and Sheena in bed; however, Sheena is unfazed. She refuses to divorce Raj and tells him she is intent on continuing with her relationship with Ricky while still being married.

Realising that Sheena wouldn't divorce him, Raj asks Ricky to return to India. Ricky refuses since he is enjoying a luxurious life with Sheena, and Raj is stunned again. Nisha attends a party in Raj's mansion and afterward claims that she was raped by Ricky. The next morning, Sheena confronts Ricky and, in a fit of rage, murders him with a sword.

A police investigation begins, and Sheena is the prime suspect. As she is being arrested, Raj confesses to the murder. When Sheena meets him in jail, he transfers all his property to her after discussing the incident. The police search the couple's house and take a few items as evidence. A hidden camera is discovered in Raj's stress ball, and Sheena's crime is discovered in its footage. She is arrested, and she transfers Raj's property back to him. It is revealed that these events were carefully planned by Raj, who is actually in love with Nisha.

In the end, Raj gives Nisha the property papers as a token of his love. As the bewildered policeman stares at Raj and Nisha in the car, Raj throws the stress ball at him and casually says,"Aisa to aksar hota hai" (This happens often).

== Cast ==
- Dino Morea as Rajveer Singh (Raj)
- Emraan Hashmi as Ricky
- Udita Goswami as Sheena Roy / Sheena Rajveer Singh
  - Voice dubbed by Niti Mathur
- Tara Sharma as Nisha
- Suresh Menon as Benz
- Rajat Bedi as Chief Investigating Officer Bakshi
- Himesh Reshammiya as Himself (special appearance)
- Tulsi Kumar as Herself (special appearance)

== Soundtrack ==
Aksar

Soundtrack album by Himesh Reshammiya
- Released: 21 December 2005
- Recorded: 2005
- Venue: Mumbai
- Genre: Feature film soundtrack
- Length: 37:40
- Label: T-Series
- Producer: Himesh Reshammiya

Himesh Reshammiya chronology
Anjaane (2005)	Aksar (2005)	Shaadi Se Pehle (2006)

All tracks in the soundtrack were composed by Himesh Reshammiya with lyrics penned by Sameer. The song "Jhalak Dikhlaja" was released in three versions. According to the Indian trade website Box Office India, with around 15,00,000 units sold, this film's soundtrack album was the year's eighth highest-selling. A critic from Rediff.com wrote that "The soundtrack of Aksar is catchy and guaranteed to score".

=== Track list ===
The soundtrack contains five original songs, three remixes and one instrumental song.

Track #	Song	Singer(s)	Duration
1	"Jhalak Dikhlaja"	Himesh Reshammiya	05:17
2	"Lagi Lagi"	Himesh Reshammiya and Sunidhi Chauhan	05:33
3	"Loot Jayenge"	Kunal Ganjawala, Sunidhi Chauhan and Jayesh Gandhi	06:02
4	"Mohabbat Ke"	Himesh Reshammiya and Tulsi Kumar	05:01
5	"Soniye"	KK and Sunidhi Chauhan	04:56
6	"Jhalak Dikhlaja (Remix)"	Himesh Reshammiya	05:01
7	"Soniye (Remix)"	KK and Sunidhi Chauhan	04:16
8	"Theme Of Aksar"	Instrumental	02:34
9	"Mohabbat Ke (Remix)"	Himesh Reshammiya and Tulsi Kumar	05:20

=== Jhalak Dikhlaja ===
"Jhalak Dikhlaja" was composed and sung by Himesh Reshammiya, which was a part of Aksar. The lyrics were written by Sameer. Jhalak Dikhlaja is a lovesick admirer's request to his lady love to give him a glance of her features. The song has been remade in the 2019 film The Body which also starred Emraan Hashmi and featured vocals by Reshammiya.

=== Controversy ===
The song was banned in a village called Bhalej in Anand district of Gujarat by locals who claimed that the song summoned snakes and ghosts. Apparently, people who sang the song said they were possessed by spirits and started behaving in a strange way. They reasoned that one of the lines "Ek Baar Aaja Aaja Aaja Aaja Aaaja" (literally "Come Come Come Come Come Just For Once") invited snakes and ghosts. Also, this led to a rumour that if this song was played late at night, especially the above line, it would summon the snakes and ghosts.

=== Remake ===
The song "Jhalak Dikhlaja" was later re-composed for the film The Body (2019 film), composed by Tanishk Bagchi and sung by Himesh Reshammiya.

== Reception ==
Film critic Taran Adarsh of Bollywood Hungama wrote that "On the whole, AKSAR has hit music as its trump card, but a difficult-to-absorb theme and lackluster screenplay will only go against it". A critic from The Times of India wrote that "The film slips because of its pace: too repetitive, too slow to qualify for a thriller. And also because of Udita Goswami: too hysterical, too loud, too much of vase throwing and cleavage showing and too little of emoting". A critic from Outlook wrote that "The film calls for a severe suspension of disbelief from whosoever dares to watch it". A critic from Hindustan Times wrote that "The film looks like something that sneaked out of French noir. With masala smattered all over of course".
