= Plan (film) =

2004 Indian film by Hriday Shetty

- Theatrical release poster
- Directed by: Hriday Shetty
- Written by: Milap Zaveri (dialogue)
- Screenplay by: Yash-Vinay
- Story by: Sanjay Gupta
- Produced by: Sanjay Gupta; Dharam Oberoi
- Starring: Sanjay Dutt; Priyanka Chopra; Dino Morea; Sanjay Suri; Sameera Reddy; Riya Sen
- Cinematography: Basha Lal
- Edited by: Bunty Nagi
- Music by: Anand Raj Anand; Vishal–Shekhar
- Distributed by: White Feather Films
- Release date: 9 January 2004
- Running time: 149 minutes
- Country: India
- Language: Hindi
- Budget: ₹9 crore
- Box office: ₹10.83 crore

Plan is a 2004 Indian Hindi-language action thriller film directed by Hriday Shetty and produced by Sanjay Gupta, starring Sanjay Dutt, Priyanka Chopra, Dino Morea, Sameera Reddy and Mahesh Manjrekar. Loosely based on the 1997 American film Suicide Kings, it was released on 9 January 2004 and was a commercial failure.

== Plot ==
Four individuals, from different walks of life, meet on a train destined towards Mumbai. They are Bobby (Dino Morea), Omi (Rohit Roy), Lucky (Sanjay Suri) and Jai (Bikram Saluja). They immediately become friends as they are alone, and only Jai has someone to live with.

Bobby dreams of becoming an actor like Amitabh Bachchan. Omi needs to get back some money from a person who borrowed it from his father. Lucky was an expert gambler in his village and intends to test his luck in Mumbai. Jai wants to regain his lost love.

It turns out that Omi had in fact made a plan with the borrower for 50% cut of the money. While Lucky starts having luck in gambling, Bobby faces hard luck in the film industry, and Jai finds out that his love, Shalini (Riya Sen), had intentionally left him, and doesn't want him back. To make Jai forget Shalini, his friends plan and hook him up with Tanya (Payal Rohatgi), a night-club prostitute, and he falls for her later. Soon after, the boys decide not to return to their village and instead enjoy the life of the city.

They enjoy the life in Mumbai, but ultimately find out that they are running short of cash. Thus Lucky decides to play a big gamble. All others pitch in whats left with them. However, the person playing opposite to Lucky cheats, resulting in Lucky owing him Rs. 700,000. They are warned to return the money in 1 week, and not to leave the city.

The only solution to their problems is kidnapping a Business tycoon, who Lucky has recently seen in nightclubs. After successfully kidnapping him, they find out that he is actually Musa Bhai (Sanjay Dutt). Musa Bhai heads the Underworld Criminal Activities of Mumbai and is the most feared gangster. However, luck favors them when Musa Bhai finds out that had they not kidnapped him, he would have died, because his men had been bribed by his rival Sultan (Mahesh Manjrekar) to kill him.

The boys help Musa Bhai eliminate his disloyal men, and in return, Musa Bhai helps Bobby get a film with his love interest Sapna (Sameera Reddy), and makes a deal with the winner of the bet that if his boys win another game, the amount is off. This time when the opponent tries to cheat, Musa prevents him from doing so. As a result, the boys are freed from the burden of handing in Rs 700,000. Though Jai expresses his feeling for Tanya, she tells him that she is not suitable for such a nice boy like him and that he should return to his village.

When it comes to fighting Sultan, Musa Bhai orders the boys to go back to their villages, stating that he wishes to do so himself, but cannot, as his crimes are far too high. However the boys return to help Musa Bhai in beating Sultan, and Musa Bhai kills him. In the end, all boys depart back to their villages, with Musa Bhai bidding them farewell, and advising them to lead an honest life.

A minor sub-plot involves Rani (Priyanka Chopra), who is a bar-dancer by profession, and is in love with Musa Bhai, and wants to marry him. Musa Bhai loves Rani too, but refuses to marry, instead suggesting that they should follow a non-marital affair, to which Rani refuses. In the end, Musa Bhai agrees to marry her.

== Cast ==
- Sanjay Dutt as Musa Bhai, the most feared Underworld Criminal in Mumbai.
- Priyanka Chopra as Rani, Musa Bhai's love interest.
- Dino Morea as Bobby, a boy who wishes to become an actor.
- Sameera Reddy as Sapna, Bobby's love interest, and his film heroine.
- Sanjay Suri as Lucky, a local gambler, who wishes to make it big in Mumbai.
- Rohit Roy as Omi, who has bluffed his father into lending money to a friend.
- Bikram Saluja as Jai, who travels to Mumbai to claim his love.
- Riya Sen as Shalini, Jai's initial love interest, later rejecting him.
- Payal Rohatgi as Tanya, a Call-Girl in a nightclub, who hooks-up with Jai, and becomes Jai's love interest.
- Sanjay Mishra as Jaggi the Pimp, to whom Jai looks forward too for finding an accommodation.
- Mahesh Manjrekar as Sultan, Musa Bhai's rival.
- Razzak Khan as Film Director Atma, who is forced by Musa Bhai to hire Bobby in a film.
- Dinyar Contractor as Laxmi Seth
- Mukesh Khanna as Ali Bhai, the head of the Underworld in Mumbai; Musa and Sultan's boss.

== Soundtrack ==
According to the Indian trade website Box Office India, with around 12,00,000 units sold, this film's soundtrack album was the year's twelfth highest-selling.

Track #	Song	Singer(s)	Composer	Lyricist
1	"Pyar Aya"	Anand Raj Anand, Alisha Chinoy	Anand Raj Anand	Dev Kohli
2	"Hota Hai Hota Hai"	Kumar Sanu, Sunidhi Chauhan	Vishal–Shekhar	Kumaar
3	"Kal Raat Se"	Kumar Sanu, Shreya Ghoshal	Anand Raj Anand	Parveen Bhardwaj
4	"Aane Wala Pal"	Abhijeet Bhattacharya, Udit Narayan, Babul Supriyo, Zubeen Garg, Anand Raj Anand	Anand Raj Anand	Dev Kohli
5	"Aim Kaim"	Sanjay Dutt, Anand Raj Anand, Shaan, Abhijeet Bhattacharya	Anand Raj Anand	Dev Kohli
6	"Mehboob Mere"	Alisha Chinoy	Anand Raj Anand	Dev Kohli
7	"Kaise Kaise"	Adnan Sami, Sunidhi Chauhan	Anand Raj Anand	Dev Kohli
8	"Aane Wala Pal (version 2)"	Abhijeet Bhattacharya, Udit Narayan, Babul Supriyo, Zubeen Garg, Anand Raj Anand	Anand Raj Anand	Dev Kohli

== Reception ==
Taran Adarsh wrote that "On the whole, PLAN meets with the expectations partly. At the box-office, the film may open well, keeping its investors safe in the process [also thanks to its reasonable price]. At best, an average fare!" A critic from Deccan Herald wrote that "Plan is a mystery.... to its makers and its audience.The first half races along, replete with slick action and stylish camerawork; but post-interval, it runs out of steam and goes absolutely haywire".

== Controversy ==
While Priyanka Chopra accused the makers of not paying her on time, DJ Cheb i Sabbah filed a copyright infringement against the makers for using his song in the film without his consent. Both Gupta and Anand denied these charges.
