= Anahita Uberoi =

Indian actress

- Born: 2 November 1967 (age 58); Bournville, England
- Occupation: Actress

Anahita Uberoi (born 2 November 1967) is an Indian actress working actively in the theater circuit. Uberoi also acted in some Hindi films.

== Early life ==
Uberoi hails from a family of thespians to Vijaya Mehta and Farrokh Mehta. Uberoi started to work in her mother's troupe at age of 12. Uberoi did her schooling from The Cathedral & John Connon School, Mumbai and later studied psychology and sociology from St. Xavier's College, Mumbai. Subsequently, she trained Herbert Berghof Studio, New York and acted on Broadway, before returning to India.

== Career ==
Anahita Uberoi worked in many English language plays like Rupert's Birthday, Going Solo, Glass Menagerie, Seascape with Sharks and Dancers and If Wishes Were Horses. Uberoi also worked as assistant director to Gloria Muzio and Joe Dowling and worked with numerous American actors and actresses includes Jason Robards, Eli Wallach, Robert Sean Leonard, Judd Hirsch and Mary Steenburgen. She has also appeared in 2003 hit film Jism, as Priyanka Kapoor.
