= Ishq Hai Tumse =

- Film poster
- Directed by: G. Krishna
- Written by: Raman Bharadwaj (dialogue)
- Screenplay by: G. Krishna
- Story by: Sana Yadi Reddy
- Produced by: G. Krishna; G. Adiseshagiri Rao
- Starring: Dino Morea; Bipasha Basu
- Cinematography: Srinivas Reddy
- Edited by: G. Krishna
- Music by: Songs: Himesh Reshammiya; Score: Vandemataram Srinivas
- Production company: Padmalaya Studios
- Release date: 2 January 2004
- Running time: 148 minutes
- Country: India
- Language: Hindi
- Budget: ₹5 crore
- Box office: ₹5.67 crore

Ishq Hai Tumse (transl. I'm in love with you) is a 2004 Indian Hindi-language musical romance film directed, co-written, produced, and edited by G. Krishna. The film stars Dino Morea and Bipasha Basu in the lead roles and the film centers on a romantic relationship that crosses religious boundaries, portraying a Hindu–Muslim interfaith marriage and the social opposition surrounding it. It is a remake of the Telugu film Sampangi (2001).

Through its narrative, Ishq Hai Tumse addresses themes of love, religious identity, and societal pressure within the context of contemporary Indian society.

== Plot ==
The film follows Arjun, a Hindu man, and Khushbu, a Muslim woman, whose families share a long-standing friendship despite belonging to different religious communities. Arjun meets Khushbu during a wedding ceremony and develops romantic feelings for her. Aware of the social and religious differences between them, he chooses not to express his feelings.

When Arjun decides to confess his love, his father suddenly suffers from kidney failure and is admitted to a hospital. During this period, Khushbu’s parents arrange her marriage to another man from their community. Unaware of Arjun’s feelings and adhering to her parents’ wishes, Khushbu agrees to the marriage.

As the wedding approaches, Arjun becomes increasingly distressed, creating tension between the two families. On the day of the wedding, Khushbu’s father stages a fake heart attack to stop the ceremony, bringing both families together at the hospital. There, Arjun publicly confesses his love for Khushbu in front of their families. Khushbu realizes Arjun’s feelings and acknowledges her own.

Moved by the couple’s sincerity, both fathers withdraw their objections and give consent to the relationship. Khushbu later converts to Hinduism in order to marry Arjun, and the two are married according to Hindu wedding rites.

In a post-credits scene, Arjun and Khushbu are shown several years later as a married couple with two children, a boy and a girl.

== Cast ==
- Dino Morea as Arjun Bhatt
- Bipasha Basu as Khushbu Akhter Bhatt
- Alok Nath as Khan Usman Saead
- Vikram Gokhale as Pandit Rabichandran Bhatt
- Tiku Talsania as Raj Bhatt
- Himani Shivpuri as Kamla Bhatt
- Raima Sen as Ishita Bhatt
- Beena Banerjee as Laxmi
- Vikram Gokhale as Pandit
- Dinesh Hingoo as Airport employee
- Mohan Gokhale as Raju Bhatt
- Nina Kulkarni as Saeda Begum
- Ashwin Kaushal as Arjun Bhatt's elder brother
- Swati Anand as Neelima Bhabhi

== Music ==
Ishq Hai Tumse

Soundtrack album by Himesh Reshammiya
- Released: 11 August 2003 (India)
- Genre: Feature film soundtrack
- Producer: Himesh Reshammiya

Himesh Reshammiya chronology
Dil Maange More (2004)	Ishq Hai Tumse (2003)	Vaada (2005)

Audio Jukebox
- Ishq Hai Tumse - Audio Jukebox on YouTube

Music Composed by Himesh Reshammiya, lyrics were by Sameer and Sanjay Chhel.

#	Title	Singer(s)
1	"O Soniya"	Alka Yagnik, Udit Narayan
2	"Dil Dil"	Alka Yagnik, Udit Narayan
3	"Chaahat Ki Khushboo"	Shaan, Alka Yagnik
4	"Lutf De Gayee"	KK, Hema Sardesai
5	"Ishq Hai Zindagi"	Alka Yagnik, Udit Narayan, Vinod Rathod
6	"O Soniya" (Remix)	Alka Yagnik, Udit Narayan
7	"Humko Chahiye"	Shaan, Sagarika
8	"Chura Liya Hai Tumne"	Shaan, Alka Yagnik
9	"Humne Tumko Dil"	Alka Yagnik, Anand Raj Anand, Babul Supriyo

== Reception ==
Taran Adarsh of IndiaFM gave the film 1 out of 5, writing, "On the whole, ISHQ HAI TUMSE has an attractive star cast and tuneful music as its strong points, but a routine script is its biggest weakness." Ronjita Kulkarni of Rediff.com wrote that "Why was Ishq Hai Tumse made?" Kavitha K of Deccan Herald wrote that "A dud movie like this does nothing to revive Dino Morea’s run at the box office though he manages to turn in a fairly decent performance". Anupama Chopra of India Today described the film as an "unpalatable mess," noting that outdated characterisations and a reluctance to depict the leads’ feelings detracted from the narrative.
