= Rinke Khanna =

Indian actress

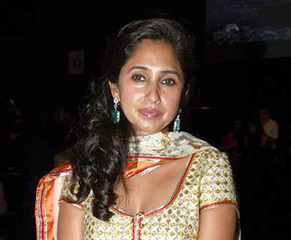
- Khanna in 2015
- Born: Rinke Jatin Khanna; 27 July 1977 (age 48); Bombay, Maharashtra, India
- Occupation: Actress
- Years active: 1999–2004
- Spouse: Samir Saran (m. 2003)
- Children: 2
- Parents: Rajesh Khanna (father); Dimple Kapadia (mother)
- Relatives: Twinkle Khanna (sister)
- Family: Khanna family

Rinke Khanna (born Rinke Jatin Khanna; 27 July 1977) is a former Indian actress. She is the youngest daughter of actress Dimple Kapadia and actor Rajesh Khanna, sister of Twinkle Khanna. She made her film debut with Pyaar Mein Kabhi Kabhi (1999), changing her original screen name from Rinkle to Rinke. In Mujhe Kucch Kehna Hai, she played a supporting role.

== Personal life ==
Khanna was born on 27 July 1977 in Bombay (now Mumbai) to actors Rajesh Khanna and Dimple Kapadia. She is the youngest daughter of her parents. Her elder sister, Twinkle Khanna, and maternal aunt Simple Kapadia, are actors. Her brother-in-law is actor Akshay Kumar.

Khanna married businessman Samir Saran on 8 February 2003 and lives in London with her husband and two children.

== Filmography ==
Year	Film	Role	Notes
1999	Pyaar Mein Kabhi Kabhi	Khushi	Zee Cine Award for Best Female Debut Nominated - Filmfare Award for Best Female Debut
2000	Jis Desh Mein Ganga Rehta Hain	Tina	
2001	Mujhe Kucch Kehna Hai	Priya Saluja	
2001	Majunu	Heena	Tamil film
2002	Yeh Hai Jalwa	Rinkie Mittal	
2002	Mango Soufflé	Kiran	
2003	Pran Jaye Par Shaan Na Jaye	Suman	
2003	Jhankaar Beats	Nicky	
2004	Chameli	Neha	

== Accolades ==
- 2000: Zee Cine Award for Best Female Debut - Pyaar Mein Kabhi Kabhi (Won)
- 2000: Filmfare Award for Best Female Debut - Pyaar Mein Kabhi Kabhi (Nominated)
