= Race (2008 soundtrack) =

Soundtrack album by Pritam
- Released: 25 January 2008
- Genre: Feature film soundtrack
- Length: 1:08:59
- Language: Hindi
- Label: Tips Industries
- Producer: Pritam

Pritam chronology
My Name Is Anthony Gonsalves (2008)	Race (2008)	Bhram (2008)

Race is the soundtrack album of the 2008 film of the same name directed by Abbas–Mustan and produced by Tips Industries. The album features 17 compositions: seven original songs, nine remixes and instrumental theme. Pritam composed the soundtrack which featured lyrics written by Sameer, and the remix versions were produced by DJ Suketu. The soundtrack was released under the Tips music label on 25 January 2008. The album received positive reviews from critics.

The song "Khwab Dekhe (Sexy Lady)" sung by Monali Thakur and Neeraj Shridhar was recorded after the release of the soundtrack, replacing the original song "Mujh Pe Toh Jadoo" in the film. Tips then re-distributed the soundtrack, adding "Khwab Dekhe (Sexy Lady)" after the release of the film.

== Reception ==
Joginder Tuteja in his review for Bollywood Hungama, called it as "an overall entertaining album". "Race's soundtrack is typical Pritam – rhythmic, with an assortment of interesting sounds from world music." Khalid Mohamed of Hindustan Times mentioned that the music "suffer from a serious Dhoom 2 complex."

According to the Indian trade website Box Office India, with around 1,700,000 units sold, this film's soundtrack album was the year's fifth highest-selling.

== Controversy ==
The song "Pehli Nazar Mein" and "Zara Zara Touch Me" were alleged on the accounts of plagiarism from the Korean song "Sa Rang Haeo" of Korean series Sassy Girl Chun-hyang and Leehom Wang's "Deep Within a Bamboo Grove". Sony BMG Taiwan has issued a legal letter to Tips Industries claiming damages for the song "Zara Zara Touch Me".

== Future ==
After the success of Race, Pritam returned to score music for Race 2 (2013). Like the first film, the music received positive reviews. The third instalment Race 3 (2018) did not feature Pritam as the composer due to the change in technical crew. However, Pritam's music group JAM8 reworked on the song "Allah Dua Hai" originally composed for Race 2, for the threequel.

== Track listing ==
No.	Title	Singer(s)	Length
1.	"Zara Zara Touch Me"	Monali Thakur, Earl Edgar, Pritam,	04:25
2.	"Pehli Nazar Mein"	Atif Aslam, Clinton Cerejo, Pritam	05:10
3.	"Khwab Dekhe (Sexy Lady)"	Pritam, Neeraj Shridhar, Monali Thakur	04:37
4.	"Race Saanson Ki"	Sunidhi Chauhan, Neeraj Shridhar, Pritam	04:44
5.	"Race Is on My Mind"	Sunidhi Chauhan, Neeraj Shridhar, Pritam	04:54
6.	"Mujh Pe Toh Jadoo"	Sunidhi Chauhan, Apache Indian, Taz, Pritam	04:36
7.	"Dekho Nashe Mein (Rock The Dance Floor)"	Sunidhi Chauhan, KK, Shaan, Pritam	04:17
8.	"Race Theme"	Abrar ul Haq, Pritam	02:12
9.	"Pehli Nazar Mein" (Club Mix)	Atif Aslam, Pritam	04:08
10.	"Pehli Nazar Mein" (Lounge Mix)	Atif Aslam, Pritam	04:22
11.	"Zara Zara Touch Me" (Asian RnB Mix)	Monali Thakur, Earl Edgar, Pritam	03:55
12.	"Zara Zara Touch Me" (Remix)	Monali Thakur, Earl Edgar, Pritam	04:46
13.	"Dekho Nashe Mein" (Asian RnB Mix)	Silk Route	04:19
14.	"Dekho Nashe Mein" (Latin Fiesta Mix)	Sunidhi Chauhan, KK, Shaan, Pritam	04:05
15.	"Mujh Pe To Jadoo" (Remix)	Sunidhi Chauhan, Apache Indian, Taz, Pritam	04:20
16.	"Race Is on My Mind" (Remix)	Sunidhi Chauhan, Neeraj Shridhar, Pritam	04:26
17.	"Race Saanson Ki" (Remix)	Sunidhi Chauhan, Neeraj Shridhar, Pritam	04:27
Total length:			1:08:59

== Accolades ==
Award (Note: Awards, festivals and organizations are in Alphabetical order.)	Category	Recipient(s)	Result	Ref.
Filmfare Awards	Best Music Director	Pritam	Nominated	
International Indian Film Academy Awards	Best Music Director	Pritam	Nominated	
International Indian Film Academy Awards	Best Lyricist	Sameer Anjaan for "Pehli Nazar Mein"	Nominated	
International Indian Film Academy Awards	Best Male Playback Singer	Atif Aslam for "Pehli Nazar Mein"	Nominated	
International Indian Film Academy Awards	Best Female Playback Singer	Monali Thakur for "Zara Zara Touch Me"	Nominated	
Producers Guild Film Awards (Note: Previously known as Apsara Film & Television Producers Guild Awards.)	Best Music Director	Pritam	Nominated	
Producers Guild Film Awards	Best Male Playback Singer	Atif Aslam for "Pehli Nazar Mein"	Nominated	
Producers Guild Film Awards	Best Female Playback Singer	Monali Thakur for "Zara Zara Touch Me"	Nominated	
