= Race (film series) =

Bollywood film series

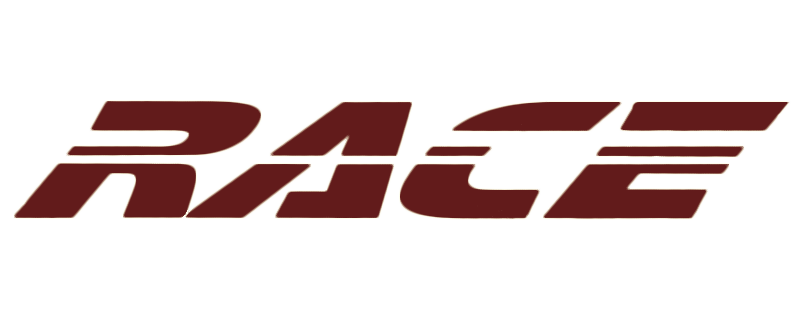
- Created by: Abbas–Mustan
- Original work: Race (2008)
- Owners: Tips Industries; Salman Khan Films
- Years: 2008–present

Films and television
- Films: Race (2008); Race 2 (2013); Race 3 (2018)

Games
- Video game: Race 2 (2013)

Audio
- Soundtracks: Race; Race 2 Race 3

Race is an Indian neo-noir action crime film series produced by Ramesh S. Taurani and Kumar S. Taurani under the banner of Tips Industries. The series was written by Kiran Kotrial, Shiraz Ahmed, Anurag Prapanna and Jitendra Parmar. The first two films star Saif Ali Khan as the main lead with Anil Kapoor as a recurring character. Where Akshaye Khanna played the antagonist in the first film. Race and Race 2 were directed by Abbas–Mustan while the third film, Race 3 was directed by Remo D'Souza. The third film Race 3 was a standalone sequel, having no connection to the storylines of Race and Race 2. Unlike the first two films, Race 3 received negative reviews from critics. The first film is loosely based on the 1998 Hollywood film Goodbye Lover.

== Overview ==
=== Race (2008) ===
A voice-over by Inspector Robert “RD” D’Costa introduces the four main characters: Ranvir "Ronny" Singh, an NRI Businessman, who runs a successful Race business inherited from his father. His younger brother Rajiv Singh who mooches off of Ronny and is an alcoholic. Ronny is dating an upcoming model Sonia, while his personal assistant Sophia appears to be secretly in love with him. Ronny is also involved in an intense competition with a rival horse-owner Kabir. The film opens with a murder plot involving a car accident which Ronny narrowly survives. When Ronny loses money in a race because his jockey had been bribed by Kabir, Ronny plants a bomb in the jockey's car and kills him, showing Ronny to be a ruthless businessman. Later, Ronny also destroys Kabir when the latter offers him money to buy his business, which is in debt.

In a drunken stupor, Rajiv confesses to Ronny that he likes Sonia and that he would quit drinking if he could spend his life with a woman like her. Ronny immediately stops dating Sonia so that Rajiv can have her. Rajiv and Sonia begin dating and appear happy until, in a twist, Rajiv reveals he knows of Sonia's shady past and has a plan to use Sonia to his advantage. Rajiv reveals that his father had secured identical life-insurance policies for huge sums on each of the sons. He explains that he wants to kill Ronny in what would appear to be an accident and inherit $100 million in insurance payments and wants Sonia to play along. Sonia agrees to help in exchange for $20 million. They pretend to get married, and Rajiv ignores Sonia in this fake-marriage while continuing to play an alcoholic. As per his instructions, Sonia seduces Ronny, who confesses he loved her all along. Rajiv reveals the rest of his plan: to threaten to commit suicide in response to Sonia and Ronny's affair by leaping off a tall building, have Ronny appear on the terrace, and get Sonia to push Ronny off. However, it turns out Ronny was aware of the plan all along as Sonia had been keeping him updated, having always been in league with him. They then plan to apparently kill Rajiv, using his own plan against him.

Things go according to plan, but Sonia double-crosses Ronny and pushes him off, saying she loved him, but the money was more important. Inspector RD appears at this point to investigate the death, accompanied by his idiotic assistant Mini. Upon his arrival, he immediately suspects foul-play in the death. During his investigation, Ronny's assistant Sophia reveals that she was married to Ronny and produces a legitimate marriage certificate. Sonia is shocked that their plan has been thwarted as Sophia is now the heir to the insurance money. In another twist, Sophia was in on the plan all along and is Rajiv's secret collaborator. Rajiv plans to bump off Sonia after he and Sophia get the insurance money. However, RD figures out during his investigation that Sophia and Rajiv had faked her marriage with Ronny and that he had been tricked into signing the marriage certificate. RD confronts Rajiv about this and agrees to remain silent about it in exchange for $25 million.

Rajiv hires the same hitman who had attempted to murder Ronny to now kill Sonia, revealing that he had been behind the first murder attempt, too. Sonia is lured into following Rajiv and Sophia to a parking lot, where the hitman attacks her. Ronny reappears and rescues her, killing the hitman in the process.

Later, when Rajiv and Sophia plan to celebrate, Ronny appears and confronts them. He explains that he had overheard Rajiv discussing the failed murder attempt with the hitman and had been playing along the whole time so he could get the insurance money from his own fake-death along with the insurance money from killing Rajiv. Discovering that Rajiv's hatred towards him as a step brother was his main reason for doing this, he allows Rajiv one last chance to win by agreeing to a car race. Ronny shows up to the race in a sports car, while Rajiv doesn't. When Rajiv protests, he switches cars with Ronny. This turns out to be a trick as Rajiv had tampered with the brakes on his own car. Ronny, in turn, lies to Rajiv, claiming he had planted a bomb in his car, similar to the one that killed the jockey, and that Ronny will trigger the device if Rajiv slows down. This causes Rajiv to crash into a petroleum tank, killing both himself and Sophia, who had been riding with him. Ronny appears to die himself, but actually narrowly escapes, later admitting that there was no bomb in the car and that Rajiv had just "killed himself".

In the end, Ronny collects the insurance money from Rajiv and Sophia's death, along with the money from his own fake-death. Upon fleeing the city, he is stopped by Inspector RD, revealed as Ronny's childhood friend who had helped Ronny fake his own death and get the insurance money. Inspector RD takes his $25 million, only to find a bomb in the bag along with the money. The bomb does not detonate and Ronny reveals that it was a mere precaution to see if RD would try to betray him and take all the money. Ronny rewards RD for his relative honesty by allowing him to live and the two drive off in opposite directions, while RD hopes to never meet Ronny again.

=== Race 2 (2013) ===
The film starts with a murderer killing his target by shooting a Lamborghini car's fuel tank. After some years, a robbery takes place, and Euro printing plates are stolen. Businessman Ranveer Singh sees this news on TV and decides to take advantage of this to get revenge for a past matter. Ranveer cheats Vikram Thapar by pretending to have stolen the Euro printing plates, and his plan is successful. He cheated Thapar so badly that he is divested of the five casinos that he owns in Istanbul, Turkey.

This cheating is revealed to be a plan that Ranveer made a week earlier with Turkish mafia leader Armaan Malik. Ranveer was introduced to Armaan by his childhood friend, Inspector Robert D Costa alias RD and his dimwitted assistant Cherry. After the con, Ranveer gives Armaan ownership of Thapar's five casinos in exchange for 10% of the money. With this deal, Ranveer and Armaan become friends. Ranveer also romances Armaan's Sister Alina (Deepika Padukone), who is his 50% business partner in all his ventures, and spent a night with him to start their partnership.

At a party hosted by Armaan and Alina, Ranveer meets Armaan's girlfriend Omisha and sees a picture of his deceased and beloved wife Sonia in her wallet. He charms her through matches of archery and fencing, where he cuts her dresses without her knowledge and walks away without watching her nudity. Ranveer then tells Armaan of a deal that will get them endless money. Armaan agrees to the plan.

Later, Ranveer reveals to RD that he is not planning to make Armaan rich, but he is actually planning to Bankrupt Armaan so badly that he will lose all his money and be forced to become a beggar on the streets, because Armaan is the main killer of Sonia. Armaan's assassin killed Sonia (Who is Pregnant) while they are going to see Sonia's sister Tania. He vows that until Armaan is ruined, he will not do Sonia's final rites. Ranveer then establishes contact with Omisha, who tells him that she is Sonia's sister Tanya and she too wants revenge. Omisha agrees to help Ranveer in his plan. However, right after Ranveer leaves, Armaan shows up at Omisha's apartment, where it is revealed that she is not actually Sonia's sister, but she is actually working for Armaan. Ranveer, however, does not know this and still believes that she is Sonia's sister.

After this, Ranveer shows RD and Cherry that his plan is to steal the Shroud of Turin. Ranveer will steal the Shroud himself, but will tell Armaan that he is getting someone else to do it. That person will ask for 15 billion Euros from Armaan, which Ranveer will secretly take. After that, he will get away with the Shroud and all of Armaan's money. RD is afraid of Armaan and therefore betrays Ranveer. RD tells Armaan all of Ranveer's plans. Armaan then tells RD to give Ranveer whatever help he needs, but RD will still be on Armaan's side. At the celebration, Aleena poison Ranveer's glass, and he died, and Omisha, Aleena, and Armaan traveled in his private jet, but Armaan is really Betraying Aleena. But, Ranveer Comes to the scene and reveals that no one is Betraying Him, but Armaan had been betrayed by everyone except Omisha. (RD, Cherry, Aleena, Ranveer, and Godfather Anza were Betraying Armaan). After a long fight in the malfunctioning private jet. Everyone Escapes. Armaan Borrowed 15 Billion From Godfather Anza, But Armaan realized that his Savings and Bearer Bonds were fake. So Anza takes everything while Omisha dumps him for Anza. Armaan is bankrupted.

Ranveer lays flowers on Sonia's grave as Alina watches on. They then meet up with RD and Cherry, and Ranveer gives RD 10% of the money they made from ruining Armaan. There, Ranveer reveals that the Shroud was never even stolen from the Church of Turin because it was too holy to be sold in the underworld market. RD then tells Alina that he never trusted her even though Ranveer trusted her fully. Ranveer reveals that, after everyone left the ruins of Antalya, Alina came back to take Ranveer to the jet. Then, they reveal how Alina switched the real money with the fake money while Ranveer and Armaan were fighting in the jet. RD then says that he does not want to risk his life again and makes Ranveer promise to never meet him again. Ranveer shakes on the promise but then warns RD that promises are made to be broken. RD and Cherry then leave in one small aircraft, while Ranveer and Alina leave in another.

=== Race 3 (2018) ===
The story starts with Shamsher Singh, who runs a big mafia empire in the Middle East with arms and narcotics. Sikander Singh is his adopted son, while Sanjana and Suraj are his twin children. Yash is the man Friday in the Shamsher Singh empire and is a close confidante of Sikander. They all live together as one family in the Middle East. One day, their family lawyer comes and meets Shamsher, and they discuss with Sanjana and Suraj as they are now 25 years old about their will. Shamsher says will have been divided among his 3 children; 50% for Sikander and 25% each for Sanjana and Suraj. Rana Vijay is the business rival of Shamsher. This causes friction in the family, and Sanjana and Suraj to start plotting against Sikander. Meanwhile, Sikander and Yash revealed that they are in love. At the party, it was revealed that they are in love with the same girl Jessica. This creates a misunderstanding between Yash and Sikander. Then Sikander clears all and tells Yash that it is a plan of Suraj and Sanjana to create misunderstanding between them. They also form a plan against Suraj and Sanjana. According to the plan, Yash expressed his anger upon Sikander and joined hands with Sanjana and Siraj. Shamsher then gives a task to Suraj, Sanjana, Yash, and Sikander. The task is that, they have to steal the hard drive from a bank in Colombia where the Indian politician's illegitimate relationships videos were captured. Shamsher wanted to blackmail the politicians with the videos. They all made a plan and stole the hard drive. But Sikander was arrested for stealing. Later it was revealed that it was Sanjana and Suraj's plan, and Yash was also betraying Sikander. Yash also made a fake relationship with Sanjana. Later, Sikander somehow escaped from the police with the help of Jessica. Later, Shamsher and Sikander lock the deal and fix a meeting with the politicians in a countryside camp. Before reaching to the camp, Sikander's car is blasted. The story takes a twist when it was revealed that Shamsher wanted to kill Sikandar. In the camp, through a video of Sikander's mother, it was revealed that Shamsher is not Suraj and Sanjana's biological father, and it is also revealed that Sikander, Suraj, and Sanjana are siblings. Shamsher announced that Yash is his son. Then Sikander suddenly reappears and tells Shamsher that he knew the truth of Shamsher since ten years with the help of Raghu Chacha. After this, a fight ensures, and Jessica is revealed to be an Interpol agent. After a fight, Sikander nearly kills Yash but tries to give him another chance. Yash was devoted to Shamsher and allowed the police to arrest him. Shamsher and Yash are arrested. It was shown that Shamsher was bribing a police officer. Sikander then announces that the race is not over yet.

=== Race 4 (TBA) ===
The fourth film in the series titled Race 4 was confirmed by Ramesh S. Taurani. Saif Ali Khan will reprise his role from the first two films.

== Films ==
Film	Release date	Director(s)	Producer(s)	Screenwriter(s)
Race	21 March 2008	Abbas–Mustan	Ramesh S. Taurani; Kumar S. Taurani	Shiraz Ahmed
Race 2	25 January 2013	Abbas–Mustan	Ramesh S. Taurani; Kumar S. Taurani	Shiraz Ahmed; Kiran Kotrial
Race 3	15 June 2018	Remo D'Souza	Ramesh S. Taurani; Salman Khan	Shiraz Ahmed; Kiran Kotrial

== Cast and characters ==
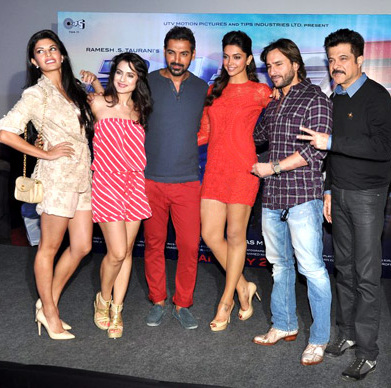
Cast members of Race 2 at a press conference.

Actor	Film		
Actor	Race (2008)	Race 2 (2013)	Race 3 (2018)
Anil Kapoor	Robert D'Costa (RD)	Robert D'Costa (RD)	Shamsher Singh
Saif Ali Khan	Ranveer Singh (Ronny)	Ranveer Singh (Ronny)	
Salman Khan			Sikandar Singh
Bipasha Basu	Sonia Martin Singh	Sonia Martin Singh	
Deepika Padukone		Aleena Malik	
Katrina Kaif	Sophia Sharma		
Jacqueline Fernandez		Omisha	Jessica Gomes
Akshaye Khanna	Rajiv Singh		
John Abraham		Armaan Malik	
Sameera Reddy	Mini		
Bobby Deol			Yash Singh
Ameesha Patel		Cherry D'Costa	
Saqib Saleem			Suraj Singh
Daisy Shah			Sanjana Singh

== Additional crew and production details ==
Occupation	Film		
Occupation	Race (2008)	Race 2 (2013)	Race 3 (2018)
Director(s)	Abbas-Mustan	Abbas-Mustan	Remo D'Souza
Producer(s)	Ramesh S. Taurani; Kumar S. Taurani	Ramesh S. Taurani	Ramesh S. Taurani; Salman Khan
Screenwriter(s)	Shiraz Ahmed; Anurag Prapanna; Jitendra Parmar	Kiran Kotrial; Shiraz Ahmed	Kiran Kotrial; Shiraz Ahmed
Composer(s)	Pritam	Pritam	JAM8; Meet Bros; Vishal Mishra; Vicky-Hardik; Shivaay Vyas; Grinder Seagal; Ali Jacko; Jayanta Pathak
Background Score	Salim–Sulaiman	Salim–Sulaiman	Salim–Sulaiman
Cinematography	Ravi Yadav	Ravi Yadav	Ayananka Bose
Editor	Hussain A. Burmawala	Hussain A. Burmawala	Steven H. Bernard
Production companies	Tips Industries	Tips Industries	Salman Khan Films; Tips Industries
Distributor(s)	UTV Motion Pictures	UTV Motion Pictures	Salman Khan Films; Tips Industries; Yash Raj Films; Phars Film
Runtime	149 minutes	150 minutes	159 minutes

== Reception ==
Box office

Film	Release date	Budget	Box office revenue
Race	21 March 2008	₹46 crore (US$10.57 million)	₹103.45 crore (US$23.78 million)
Race 2	25 January 2013	₹94 crore (US$16.04 million)	₹173.36 crore (US$29.58 million)
Race 3	15 June 2018	₹150 crore (US$21.93 million)–₹180 crore (US$26.32 million)	₹295 crore (US$43.14 million)–₹303 crore (US$44.31 million)
Total		₹290 crore (US$30 million)–₹320 crore (US$33 million)	₹571.81 crore (US$59 million)–₹579.81 crore (US$60 million)

Critical reception

Film	Rotten Tomatoes
Race	N/A (4 reviews)
Race 2	0% (3.5/10 average rating) (6 reviews)
Race 3	13% (3.1/10 average rating) (15 reviews)

== Game ==
Race 2, a racing mobile video game developed by Gameshastra was released along with the 2013 film.
