= 10th IIFA Awards =

Major film awards ceremony honoring the best Bollywood films of 2008

- Date: 11 June 2009– 13 June 2009
- Site: The Venetian Macao, Macau
- Hosted by: Boman Irani; Ritesh Deshmukh; Lara Dutta

Highlights
- Best Picture: Jodhaa Akbar
- Best Direction: Ashutosh Gowariker (Jodhaa Akbar)
- Best Actor: Hrithik Roshan (Jodhaa Akbar)
- Best Actress: Priyanka Chopra (Fashion)
- Most awards: Jodhaa Akbar (10)
- Most nominations: Jodhaa Akbar (16)

Television coverage
- Channel: Star Plus
- Network: STAR TV

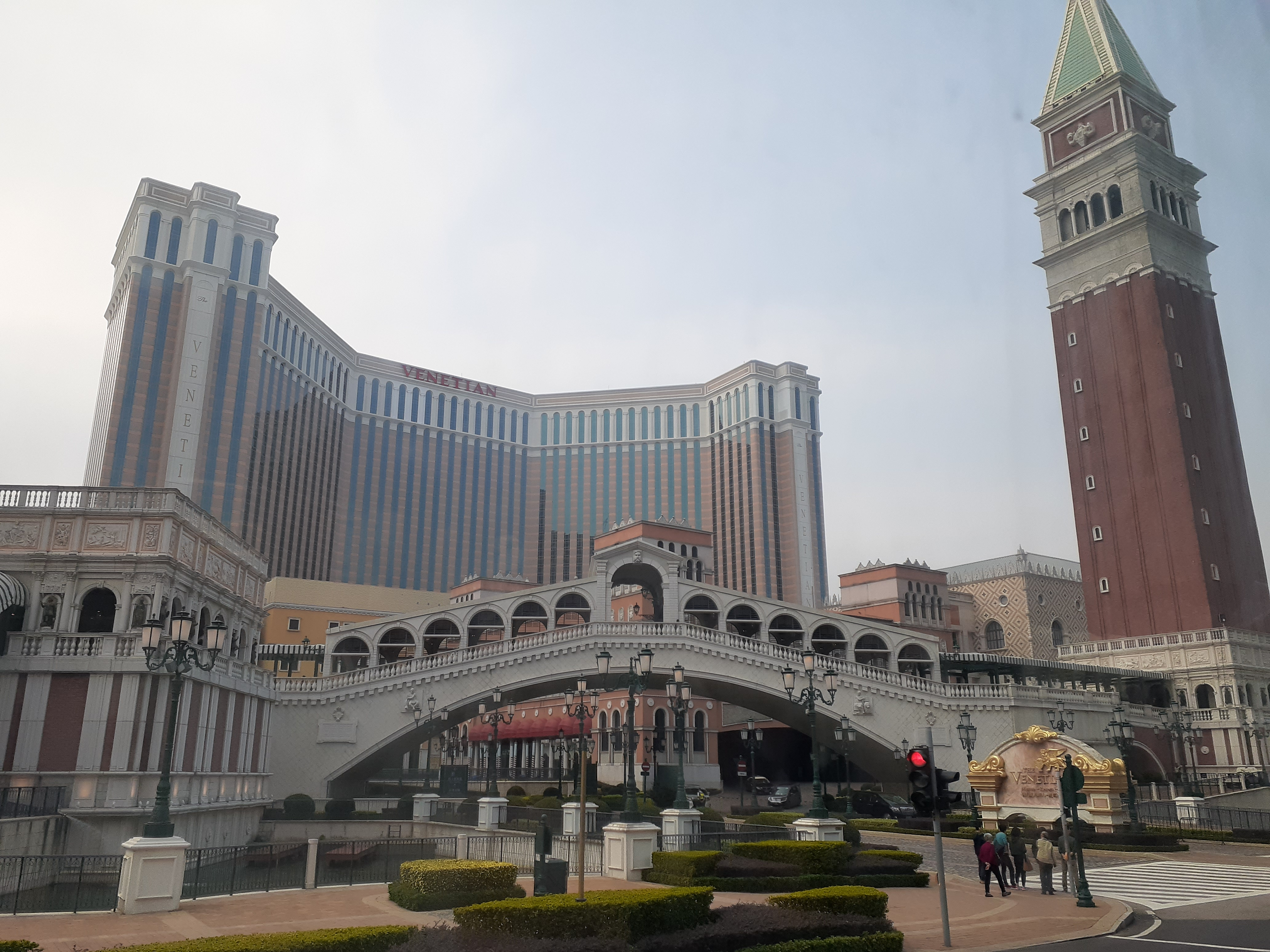
The event was held at The Venetian Macao in Macau, China.

The 10th International Indian Film Academy Awards (informally known as the Decadial IIFA Awards) were a major film awards ceremony honoring the best Bollywood films of 2008. The ceremony was held in The Venetian Macao, Macau from 11 June to 13 June 2009. The choice of Macau as host city was considered a well-planned decision, aimed at reducing tensions between India and China, as well as to end the "deadlock" between the two countries over the issue of exchange of cinema. The ceremony was hosted by Boman Irani, Ritesh Deshmukh and Lara Dutta.

IIFA completed 10 years of existence in 2009, giving awards to numerous prominent film personalities. In honour of this landmark, five special IIFA Awards were awarded that year, and these awards were collectively called as the IIFA Golden Decade Honors (also as the Artists of the Decade Awards).

Jodhaa Akbar led the ceremony with 13 nominations, followed by Race with 9 nominations, Rock On!! with 8 nominations, and Dostana and Ghajini with 6 nominations each.

Jodhaa Akbar won 10 awards, including Best Film, Best Director (for Ashutosh Gowariker) and Best Actor (for Hrithik Roshan), thus becoming the most-awarded film at the ceremony.

== Choice of host city and venue ==
Usually, the decision of a host city for the forthcoming IIFA Award ceremony takes place in the first press conference in the host city itself. This rule was broken and the host city and venue for the 2009 edition of the awards was announced in Mumbai. Brand Ambassador of IIFA, Amitabh Bachchan, announced Macau as host city in an event in the JW Marriott Hotel. The venue was declared to be The Venetian Macao, one of the largest resorts in the world. Reportedly, Toronto (was later chosen as host for 2011) and Istanbul had also bid for the awards. The next award ceremony were announced to be held in Colombo, Sri Lanka in 2010.

Macau was once again hosted the 2013 IIFA Awards.

== Winners and nominees ==
Winners are listed first and highlighted in boldface.

=== Popular awards ===
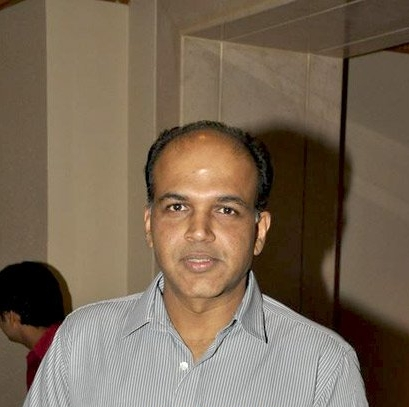
Ashutosh Gowariker (Best Director)

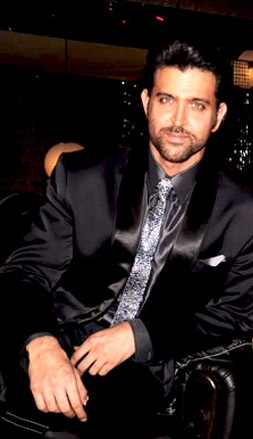
Hrithik Roshan (Best Actor)

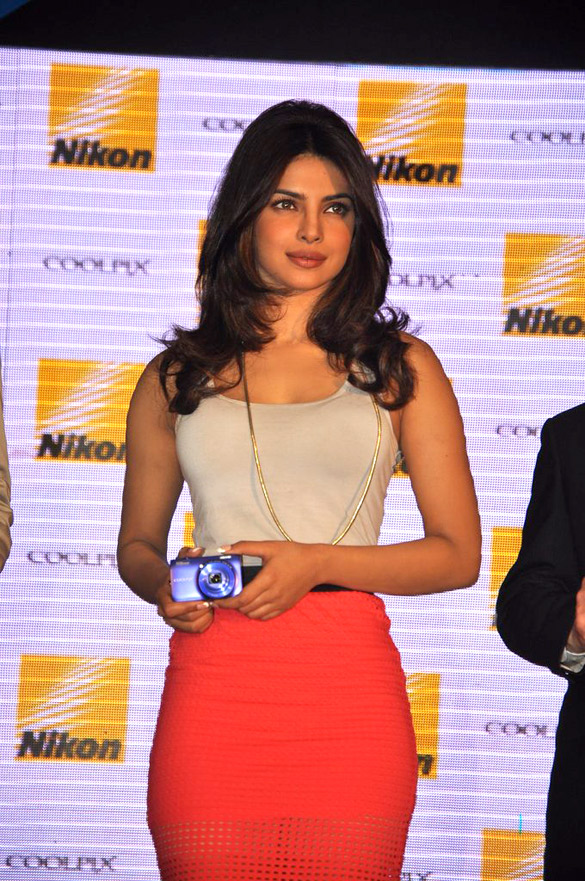
Priyanka Chopra (Best Actress)

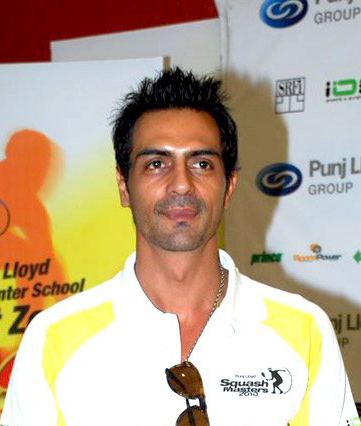
Arjun Rampal (Best Supporting Actor)

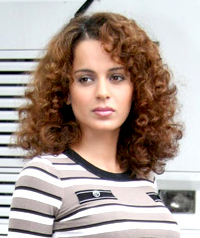
Kangana Ranawat (Best Supporting Actress)

Best Picture	Best Director
**Jodhaa Akbar – UTV Motion Pictures and Ashutosh Gowariker Productions**; A Wednesday! – UTV Motion Pictures, Anjum Rizvi Film Company and A Friday Filmworks; Dostana – Dharma Productions and Yash Raj Films; Ghajini – Geetha Arts and Reliance Entertainment; Race – Tips Music Films and UTV Motion Pictures; Rock On!! – Excel Entertainment and Reliance Big Pictures	**Ashutosh Gowariker – Jodhaa Akbar**; A. R. Murugadoss – Ghajini; Abhishek Kapoor – Rock On!!; Madhur Bhandarkar – Fashion; Neeraj Pandey – A Wednesday!
Best Performance In A Leading Role Male	Best Performance In A Leading Role Female
**Hrithik Roshan – Jodhaa Akbar as Jalaluddin Mohammad Akbar**; Aamir Khan – Ghajini as Sanjay Singhania; Abhishek Bachchan – Dostana as Sameer(Sam); Naseeruddin Shah – A Wednesday! as (the unnamed caller); Shah Rukh Khan – Rab Ne Bana Di Jodi as Surinder "Suri" Sahni/Raj Kapoor	**Priyanka Chopra – Fashion as Meghna Mathur**; Aishwarya Rai – Jodhaa Akbar as Rajkumari Jodhaa; Asin – Ghajini as Kalpana; Bipasha Basu – Race as Sonia Singh; Katrina Kaif – Singh Is Kinng as Sonia Singh
Best Performance In A Supporting Role Male	Best Performance In A Supporting Role Female
**Arjun Rampal – Rock On!! as Joe Mascarenhas**; Abhishek Bachchan – Sarkar Raj as Shankar Nagare; Irrfan Khan – Mumbai Meri Jaan as Thomas; Sonu Sood – Jodhaa Akbar as Rajkumar Sujamal; Vinay Pathak – Rab Ne Bana Di Jodi as Balwinder "Bobby" Khosla	**Kangana Ranawat – Fashion as Shonali Gujral**; Bipasha Basu – Bachna Ae Haseeno as Radhika/Shreya Rathore; Ila Arun – Jodhaa Akbar as Maham Anga; Kirron Kher – Dostana as Sameer's mother; Shahana Goswami – Rock On!! as Debbie
Best Performance In A Comic Role	Best Performance In A Negative Role
**Abhishek Bachchan – Dostana as Sameer (Sam)**; Anil Kapoor – Race as Robert D'Costa (R.D); Rajpal Yadav – Bhoothnath as Anthony; Shreyas Talpade – Welcome to Sajjanpur as Mahadev Kushwaha; Tejpal Singh – Jodhaa Akbar as Ni'Mat; Tushar Kapoor – Golmaal Returns as Lucky	**Akshaye Khanna – Race as Rajeev Singh**; Imran Khan – Kidnap as Kabir Sharma; Paresh Rawal – Oye Lucky! Lucky Oye! as Lucky's Father / Gogi Arora / Dr. B. D. Handa; Pradeep Rawat – Ghajini as Ghajini Dharmatma; Visshwa Badola – Jodhaa Akbar as Saadir Adaasi
Male Debutant Star	Female Debutant Star
**Farhan Akhtar – Rock On!! as Aditya Shroff**	**Asin – Ghajini as Kalpana**

=== Musical awards ===
Best Music Director	Best Lyrics
**A. R. Rahman – Jodhaa Akbar**; A. R. Rahman – Ghajini; Pritam – Race; Shankar–Ehsaan–Loy – Rock On!!; Vishal–Shekhar – Dostana	**"Jashan-e-Baharaa" from Jodhaa Akbar – Javed Akhtar**; "Khuda Jaane" from Bachna Ae Haseeno – Anvita Dutt Guptan; "Haule Haule" from Rab Ne Bana Di Jodi – Jaideep Sahni; "Socha hai" from Rock On!! – Javed Akhtar; "Pehli Nazar Mein" from Race – Sameer
Best Male Playback Singer	Best Female Playback Singer
**Javed Ali for "Jashan-e-Baharaa" – Jodhaa Akbar**; Atif Aslam for "Pehli Nazar Mein" – Race; Farhan Akhtar for "Socha hai" – Rock On!!; KK for "Khuda Jaane" – Bachna Ae Haseeno; Sukhwinder Singh for "Haule Haule" – Rab Ne Bana Di Jodi	**Shreya Ghoshal for "Teri Ore" – Singh Is Kinng**; Bela Shende for "Man Mohana" – Jodhaa Akbar; Monali Thakur for "Zara Zara Touch Me" – Race; Shilpa Rao for "Khuda Jaane" – Bachna Ae Haseeno; Sunidhi Chauhan for "Desi Girl" – Dostana

=== Backstage awards ===
Best Story	Best Screenplay
**A Wednesday! – Neeraj Pandey**; Fashion – Madhur Bhandarkar, Anuradha Tewari and Ajay Monga; Jodhaa Akbar – Haidar Ali; Race – Shiraz Ahmed; Rock On!! – Abhishek Kapoor	**A Wednesday! – Neeraj Pandey**
Best Dialogue
**Manu Rishi for Oye Lucky! Lucky Oye!**

=== Technical awards ===
Best Art Direction	Best Action
**Jodhaa Akbar – Nitin Chandrakant Desai**	**Ghajini – Peter Steins & Stun Siva**
Best Cinematographer	Best Choreography
**Rock On!! – Jason West**	**Desi Girl from Dostana – Farah Khan**
Best Costume Design	Best Editing
**Jodhaa Akbar – Neeta Lulla**	**Jodhaa Akbar – Ballu Saluja**
Best Makeup	Best Sound Recording
**Jodhaa Akbar – Madhav Kadam**	**Ghajini – Resul Pookutty & Amrit**
Best Sound Re-Recording	Best Special Effects
**Race – Leslie Fernandes**	**Ghajini – Prime Focus**

Style Icon of the Year

- Female – Bipasha Basu
- Male – Hrithik Roshan

Lifetime Achievement Award

- Rajesh Khanna

Green Globe Honour

- Rahul Bose

== IIFA Golden Decade Honour ==
Category	Actor	Film
Movie of the Decade	Aamir Khan	Lagaan
Director of the Decade	Rakesh Roshan	Kaho Naa... Pyaar Hai and Koi... Mil Gaya
Star of the Decade – Male	Shahrukh Khan	Devdas, Veer-Zaara and Chak De India
Star of the Decade – Female	Aishwarya Rai Bachchan	Hum Dil De Chuke Sanam and Devdas
Music of the Decade	A. R. Rahman	Taal, Lagaan, Saathiya, Rang De Basanti and Guru

Rakesh Roshan won Director of the Decade even though Sanjay Leela Bhansali had won the most IIFA Award for Best Director awards (Hum Dil De Chuke Sanam, Devdas and Black). If the year 2009 was counted, then Hrithik Roshan would have one more IIFA Award for Best Actor than Shahrukh Khan, for the films Kaho Naa... Pyaar Hai, Koi... Mil Gaya, Krrish and Jodhaa Akbar.

=== Special awards ===
==== Outstanding Achievement In International Cinema ====
- Aishwarya Rai Bachchan

== Superlatives ==
Films with multiple nominations
Nominations	Film
13	Jodhaa Akbar
9	Race
8	Rock On!!
6	Dostana
6	Ghajini
4	A Wednesday!
4	Bachna Ae Haseeno
4	Fashion
4	Rab Ne Bana Di Jodi
2	Singh Is Kinng

Films with multiple awards
Awards	Film
10	Jodhaa Akbar
4	Ghajini
3	Rock On!!
2	A Wednesday!
2	Dostana
2	Fashion
2	Race
