= List of Hindi films of 2008 =

This is a list of films produced by the Bollywood film industry based in Mumbai in 2008.

== Highest-grossing films ==
No.	Title	Production company	Gross
1	Ghajini	Indian Films; Big Pictures; Geetha Arts	₹232 crore (US$53.33 million)
2	Rab Ne Bana Di Jodi	Yash Raj Films	₹157 crore (US$36.09 million)
3	Singh Is Kinng	Indian Films; Big Pictures; Hari Om Entertainment; Blockbuster Movie Entertainers	₹136 crore (US$31.26 million)
4	Jodhaa Akbar	UTV Motion Pictures; Ashutosh Gowariker Productions	₹120 crore (US$27.58 million)
5	Race	UTV Motion Pictures; Tips Industries	₹106 crore (US$24.37 million)
6	Golmaal Returns	Shree Ashtavinayak Cine Vision; Indian Films	₹95 crore (US$21.84 million)
7	Dostana	Yash Raj Films; Dharma Productions	₹87 crore (US$20 million)
8	Bachna Ae Haseeno	Yash Raj Films	₹79 crore (US$18.16 million)
9	Bhoothnath	Eros International; Indian Films; B. R. Films	₹70 crore (US$16.09 million)
10	Sarkar Raj	Eros International; Adlabs; Balaji Motion Pictures; Raksha Entertainment; K Sera Sera; Z Picture Company	₹63 crore (US$14.48 million)

== List of released films ==
=== January–March ===
Opening		Title	Director	Cast	Genre	Studio
J A N	4	Humne Jeena Seekh Liya	Milind Ukey	Siddharth Chandekar, Mrunmayi Deshpande	Comedy	Ukey Films
J A N	11	Halla Bol	Rajkumar Santoshi	Ajay Devgn, Vidya Balan, Tushar Kapoor, Kareena Kapoor, Pankaj Kapur, Sana Khan, Jackie Shroff, Aarti Chabria	Social	Indian Films, Pyramid Saimira, Sunrise Pictures
J A N	11	My Name Is Anthony Gonsalves	Eeshwar Nivas	Nikhil Dwivedi, Amrita Rao, Vishal O Sharma, Mithun Chakraborty, Lillete Dubey, Jawed Sheikh	Crime, drama	Sahara One Motion Pictures, E Niwas Productions
J A N	18	Bombay to Bangkok	Nagesh Kukunoor	Shreyas Talpade, Lena Christensen, Naseeruddin Shah	Comedy, drama, romance	Mukta Arts
J A N	18	Tulsi	K. Ajay Kumar	Irrfan Khan, Manisha Koirala, Arzoo Govitrikar	Drama	Sri Tirumala Tirupathi Venkateswara Films
J A N	25	Sunday	Rohit Shetty	Ajay Devgn, Ayesha Takia, Arshad Warsi, Irrfan Khan, Tusshar Kapoor, Esha Deol, Murli Sharma, Anjana Sukhani	Action, comedy	Eros International, Big Screen Entertainment
F E B	1	Rama Rama Kya Hai Dramaa?	S. Chandrakaant	Rajpal Yadav, Neha Dhupia, Ashish Chaudhary, Amrita Arora, Anupam Kher, Rati Agnihotri, Alan Kapoor	Comedy	Oracle Entertainment
F E B	8	Superstar	Rohit Jugraj	Kunal Khemu, Tulip Joshi, Aman Verma, Aushima Sawhney, Reema Lagoo, Sharat Saxena	Drama	Shree Ashtavinayak Cine Vision
F E B	15	Jodhaa Akbar	Ashutosh Gowariker	Hrithik Roshan, Aishwarya Rai Bachchan, Sonu Sood, Ila Arun	History, romance	UTV Motion Pictures, Ashutosh Gowariker Productions
M A R	7	Black & White	Subhash Ghai	Anil Kapoor, Anurag Sinha, Shefali Shah, Aditi Sharma, Anurag Singh	Social, drama, history	Mukta Searchlight Films
M A R	21	Race	Abbas–Mustan	Anil Kapoor, Saif Ali Khan, Bipasha Basu, Akshaye Khanna, Katrina Kaif, Sameera Reddy	Crime, thriller	UTV Motion Pictures, Tips Industries
M A R	28	One Two Three	Ashwni Dhir	Tusshar Kapoor, Paresh Rawal, Suniel Shetty, Esha Deol, Sameera Reddy, Upen Patel, Neetu Chandra, Tanishaa Mukerji, Murli Sharma, Ashwin Mushran	Comedy, drama	Eros International, Big Screen Entertainment

=== April–June ===
Opening		Title	Director	Cast	Genre	Studio
A P R	4	Shaurya	Samar Khan	Kay Kay Menon, Rahul Bose, Minissha Lamba, Shah Rukh Khan, Amrita Rao, Javed Jaffrey	Drama	
A P R	4	Bhram	Pavan Kaul	Dino Morea, Deepshikha Nagpal, Milind Soman, Sheetal Menon, Karan Singh Grover, Chetan Hansraj	Thriller	
A P R	11	Krazzy 4	Jaideep Sen	Juhi Chawla, Arshad Warsi, Irrfan Khan, Suresh Menon, Rajpal Yadav, Dia Mirza, Mukesh Rishi, Rajat Kapoor	Comedy	Eros International, FilmKraft Productions
A P R	11	U Me Aur Hum	Ajay Devgn	Ajay Devgn, Kajol, Aditya Singh Rajput, Karan Khanna, Isha Sharvani, Hazel Crowney, Sumeet Raghavan, Divya Dutta	Romance	Eros International, Devgan Films
A P R	11	Pehli Nazar Ka Pyaar	Arshad Khan	Arbaaz Ali Khan, Vikas Anand, Rahul, Dinesh Hingoo, Tej Sapru	Romance	
A P R	25	Sirf	Rajaatesh Nayar	Kay Kay Menon, Manisha Koirala, Ranvir Shorey, Parvin Dabas, Sonali Kulkarni	Drama, romance	
A P R	25	Tashan	Vijay Krishna Acharya	Akshay Kumar, Saif Ali Khan, Kareena Kapoor, Anil Kapoor, Manoj Pahwa, Rajesh Jais	Action, romance	Yash Raj Films
M A Y	2	Mr. Black Mr. White	Deepak Shivdasani	Sunil Shetty, Sandhya Mridul, Arshad Warsi, Sharat Saxena, Tania Zaetta, Rashmi Nigam	Comedy	Eros International, White House Productions, T.A. Shah Group of Companies
M A Y	2	Anamika	Anant Mahadevan	Dino Morea, Minissha Lamba, Koena Mitra, Aarti Chabria, Gulshan Grover	Thriller	
M A Y	9	Jimmy	Raj N. Sippy	Mimoh Chakraborty, Rati Agnihotri, Vikas Anand	Drama, action, crime, thriller, romance	
M A Y	9	Bhoothnath	Vivek Sharma	Amitabh Bachchan, Juhi Chawla, Priyanshu Chatterjee, Shah Rukh Khan, Aman Siddiqui, Rajpal Yadav, Satish Shah, Ashish Chaudhary, Nauheed Cyrusi, Shaana Diya	Comedy, drama, fantasy	Eros International, Indian Films, B.R. Films
M A Y	16	Jannat	Kunal Deshmukh	Emraan Hashmi, Vishal Malhotra, Sonal Chauhan, Sameer Kochhar, Javed Shaikh	Drama, romance	Percept Picture Company, Vishesh Films
M A Y	23	Dhoom Dadakka	Shashi Ranjan	Anupam Kher, Gulshan Grover, Satish Kaushik, Satish Shah	Comedy	
M A Y	23	Don Muthu Swami	Ashim Samanta	Hrishita Bhatt, Mithun Chakraborty, Shakti Kapoor, Rohit Roy	Comedy	
M A Y	23	Ghatothkach	Singeetam Srinivasa Rao		Fantasy	
M A Y	30	Woodstock Villa	Hansal Mehta	Sikandar Kher, Neha Oberoi, Gaurav Gera, Arbaaz Khan, Sanjay Dutt, Shakti Kapoor, Gulshan Grover, Sachin Khedekar, Boman Irani, Anupama Verma	Thriller	White Feather Films
J U N	6	Aamir	Rajkumar Gupta	Rajeev Khandelwal, Gajraj Rao, Rohitash Gaud, Sudipto Balav, Vikas Bahl, Uday Sabnis	Drama, thriller	UTV Spotboy
J U N	6	Sarkar Raj	Ram Gopal Verma	Amitabh Bachchan, Abhishek Bachchan, Aishwarya Rai Bachchan, Supriya Pathak, Tanishaa Mukerji, Ravi Kale	Action, crime, drama, thriller	Eros International, Adlabs, Balaji Motion Pictures, Raksha Entertainment, K Sera Sera, Z Picture Company
J U N	13	Mere Baap Pehle Aap	Priyadarshan	Akshaye Khanna, Paresh Rawal, Genelia D'Souza, Arzoo Govitrikar, Om Puri, Rajpal Yadav	Comedy	Shemaroo Entertainment
J U N	13	Summer 2007	Suhail Tatari	Sikandar Kher, Gul Panag, Neetu Chandra, Susan Brar, Uvika Choudhary	Drama	
J U N	20	De Taali	Eeshwar Nivas	Riteish Deshmukh, Aftab Shivdasani, Ayesha Takia, Rimi Sen, Mukul Dev, Neha Dhupia, Anupam Kher, Anjana Sukhani	Comedy, romance	Sahara One Motion Pictures, Rising Star Entertainment
J U N	20	Haal-e-Dil	Anil Devgan	Ajay Devgn, Kajol, Naseer Abdullah, Amita Pathak, Mukesh Tiwari, Nakuul Mehta, Adhyayan Suman	Drama, romance	Eros International, Big Screen Entertainment
J U N	27	Thoda Pyaar Thoda Magic	Kunal Kohli	Saif Ali Khan, Rani Mukerji, Sharat Saxena, Ameesha Patel, Rishi Kapoor	Drama, romance, fantasy	Yash Raj Films, Kunal Kohli Productions
J U N	27	Thodi Life Thoda Magic	Vinayak Rajesh	Jackie Shroff, Anita Raj, Parmeet Sethi, Paresh Rawal, Arbaaz Khan	Drama	
J U N	27	Via Darjeeling	Arindam Nandy	Kay Kay Menon, Sonali Kulkarni, Vinay Pathak, Sandhya Mridul, Rajat Kapoor	Drama, mystery, thriller	

=== July–September ===
Opening		Title	Director	Cast	Genre	Studio
J U L	4	Jaane Tu... Ya Jaane Na	Abbas Tyrewala	Imran Khan, Genelia D'Souza, Prateik Babbar, Murali Sharma, Ratna Pathak, Shakun Batra, Ayaz Khan, Naseeruddin Shah, Paresh Rawal, Manjari Fadnis, Arbaaz Khan, Rajat Kapoor, Sugandha Garg, Sohail Khan	Romance, comedy, drama	UTV Motion Pictures, Aamir Khan Productions, PVR Pictures
J U L	4	Love Story 2050	Harry Baweja	Dalip Tahil, Priyanka Chopra, Harman Baweja, Boman Irani	Drama, musical, romance	Adlabs, Baweja Studios
J U L	11	Mehbooba	Afzal Khan	Ajay Devgn, Manisha Koirala, Sanjay Dutt, Asrani, Kader Khan, Annu Kapoor	Romance	Adlabs, Shabbo Arts
J U L	18	Kismat Konnection	Aziz Mirza	Shahid Kapoor, Vidya Balan, Shah Rukh Khan, Om Puri, Juhi Chawla, Amit Varma, Boman Irani, Karanvir Bohra, Hyder Ali, Vishal Malhotra, Himani Shivpuri	Comedy, drama, romance	UTV Motion Pictures, Tips Industries
J U L	18	Contract	Ram Gopal Varma	Adhvik Mahajan, Sakshi Gulati, Kishor Kadam, Sumeet Nijhawan	Thriller, spy	PVR Pictures, Ace Movie Company
J U L	25	Mission Istaanbul	Apoorva Lakhia	Vivek Oberoi, Shweta Bhardwaj, Abhishek Bachchan, Shriya Saran, Suniel Shetty, Zayed Khan, Nikitin Dheer, Shabbir Ahluwalia	Adventure	Balaji Motion Pictures, Popcorn Motion Pictures
J U L	25	Money Hai Toh Honey Hai	Ganesh Acharya	Govinda, Aftab Shivdasani, Upen Patel, Manoj Bajpayee, Hansika Motwani, Celina Jaitly, Kim Sharma, Priyanka Sharma	Comedy, drama, romance	Eros International, Big Screen Entertainment
A U G	1	Ugly Aur Pagli	Sachin Khot	Ranvir Shorey, Mallika Sherawat, Vishal Malhotra, Payal Rohatgi, Tinnu Anand, Gaurav Kapur, Sapna Bhavnani, Zeenat Aman	Comedy	Pritish Nandy Communications
A U G	8	Good Luck!	Aditya Datt	Aryeman, Sayali Bhagat, Ranvir Shorey, Lucky Ali, Archana Puran Singh, Mushtaq Khan, Nazneen Patel	Comedy, drama	YT Entertainment, Om Film Company
A U G	8	Singh Is Kinng	Anees Bazmee	Akshay Kumar, Katrina Kaif, Om Puri, Neha Dhupia, Javed Jaffrey, Kiron Kher, Ranvir Shorey	Action, comedy, crime, romance	Indian Films, Big Pictures, Hari Om Entertainment, Blockbuster Movie Entertainers
A U G	15	Bachna Ae Haseeno	Siddharth Anand	Ranbir Kapoor, Bipasha Basu, Deepika Padukone, Minissha Lamba, Kunal Kapoor	Romance, comedy, drama	Yash Raj Films
A U G	15	God Tussi Great Ho	Rumi Jaffery	Sohail Khan, Salman Khan, Priyanka Chopra, Amitabh Bachchan, Dalip Tahil, Anupam Kher	Comedy, romance	Eros International, Big Pictures, Shabbo Arts
A U G	22	Phoonk	Ram Gopal Varma	Amruta Khanvilkar, Ahsaas Channa, Kenny Desai, Ashwini Kalsekar	Horror	One More Thought Entertainment, Ace Movie Company
A U G	22	Mumbai Meri Jaan	Nishikanth Kamat	Kay Kay Menon, Soha Ali Khan, Nishikant Kamat, Paresh Rawal, R. Madhavan	Drama	UTV Motion Pictures
A U G	22	Maan Gaye Mughal-e-Azam	Sanjay Chhel	Rahul Bose, Mallika Sherawat, Kay Kay Menon, Paresh Rawal	Comedy	Moserbaer Entertainment, Venus Records & Tapes
A U G	29	Rock On!!	Abhishek Kapoor	Arjun Rampal, Farhan Akhtar, Prachi Desai, Luke Kenny, Purab Kohli, Koel Purie, Shahana Goswami, Nicolette Bird	Drama, romance, musical	Big Pictures, Excel Entertainment
A U G	29	C Kkompany	Sachin Yardi	Tusshar Kapoor, Raima Sen, Karan Johar, Rajpal Yadav, Anupam Kher, Sanjay Dutt	Comedy	Balaji Motion Pictures
A U G	29	Chamku	Kabeer Kaushik	Priyanka Chopra, Bobby Deol, Danny Denzongpa, Deepal Shaw, Irrfan Khan, Riteish Deshmukh, Rajpal Yadav	Musical, romance, thriller	Vijayta Films
A U G	29	Mukhbiir	Mani Shankar	Jackie Shroff, Om Puri, Sunil Shetty, Rahul Dev, Sameer Dattani, Raima Sen, Sushant Singh	Thriller	Pyramid Saimira, Colorchips New Media
S E P	5	A Wednesday!	Neeraj Pandey	Naseeruddin Shah, Anupam Kher, Jimmy Sheirgill, Deepal Shaw	Drama, thriller	UTV Motion Pictures, Friday Filmworks, Anjum Rizvi Film Co.
S E P	5	Tahaan	Santosh Sivan	Rahul Bose, Fatima Sana Shaikh, Rahul Khanna, Sarika, Anupam Kher	Adventure, drama	IDream Productions, Santosh Sivan Films
S E P	5	Hijack	Kunal Shivdasani	Shiney Ahuja, Esha Deol, KK Raina, Ishita Chauhan	Action, thriller	Eros International
S E P	12	1920	Vikram Bhatt	Rajneesh Duggal, Adah Sharma, Vipin Sharma, Indraneil Sengupta	Horror, mystery, romance, thriller	Big Pictures, ASA Productions and Enterprises
S E P	12	The Last Lear	Rituparno Ghosh	Amitabh Bachchan, Preity Zinta, Arjun Rampal, Divya Dutta, Shefali Shah, Jisshu Sengupta	Biography, drama	Planman Motion Pictures
S E P	19	Welcome to Sajjanpur	Shyam Benegal	Shreyas Talpade, Amrita Rao, Kunal Kapoor, Ravi Kishan, Yashpal Sharma	Comedy, drama	UTV Spotboy, Bindass
S E P	19	Saas Bahu Aur Sensex	Shona Urvashi	Tanushree Dutta, Ankur Khanna, Kiron Kher, Farooq Sheikh	Comedy	Warner Bros. Pictures, PLA Entertainment
S E P	26	Hari Puttar: A Comedy of Terrors	Lucky Kohli & Rajesh Bajaj	Sarika, Zain Khan, Sweeny Khara, Aditya Kapadia, Saurabh Shukla, Vijay Raaz, Jackie Shroff, Lillete Dubey, Shamita Shetty	Comedy	Warner Bros. Pictures, Mirchi Movies

=== October–December ===
Opening		Title	Director	Cast	Genre	Studio
O C T	2	Kidnap	Sanjay Gadhvi	Sanjay Dutt, Minissha Lamba, Imran Khan, Vidya Malvade, Rahul Dev, Reema Lagoo, Ankita Makwana, Sophie Choudry, Raj Zutshi, Sonia Kapoor	Crime, thriller	Shree Ashtavinayak Cine Vision, Indian Films
O C T	2	Drona	Goldie Behl	Abhishek Bachchan, Priyanka Chopra, Kay Kay Menon, Ali Haji, Shahid Kapoor, Jaya Bachchan	Superhero, action, adventure, fantasy	Eros International, Rose Movies
O C T	10	Hello	Atul Agnihotri	Sharat Saxena, Arbaaz Khan, Katrina Kaif, Sohail Khan, Sharman Joshi, Amrita Arora, Gul Panag, Isha Koppikar, Salman Khan	Drama, romance	Percept Picture Company, Columbia Pictures, Mirah Entertainment, Funky Buddha Media, Reel Life Production
O C T	17	Karzzzz	Satish Kaushik	Himesh Reshammiya, Benjamin Schoefer, Urmila Matondkar, Dino Morea, Gulshan Grover	Action, romance, drama	Big Pictures, T-Series Films
O C T	24	Heroes	Samir Karnik	Salman Khan, Preity Zinta, Mithun Chakraborty, Bobby Deol, Sunny Deol, Sohail Khan, Vatsal Sheth, Amrita Arora, Dino Morea, Riya Sen	Drama	Eros International, Mega Bollywood, Future Picture Company
O C T	24	Roadside Romeo	Jugal Hansraj	Saif Ali Khan, Kareena Kapoor, Javed Jaffrey, Suresh Menon, Kiku Sharda	Animation, family, romance	Yash Raj Films, Walt Disney Pictures
O C T	29	Golmaal Returns	Rohit Shetty	Ajay Devgn, Kareena Kapoor, Arshad Warsi, Amrita Arora, Shreyas Talpade, Celina Jaitly, Tusshar Kapoor, Anjana Sukhani	Comedy	Shree Ashtavinayak Cine Vision, Indian Films
O C T	29	Fashion	Madhur Bhandarkar	Ranvir Shorey, Priyanka Chopra, Karan Johar, Kangana Ranaut, Arbaaz Khan, Mugdha Godse, Arjan Bajwa, Ashwin Mushran, Samir Soni, Konkona Sen Sharma, Rohit Roy, Raj Babbar, Harsh Chhaya, Kiran Juneja, Humayun Saeed, Zac Efron	Drama, romance	UTV Motion Pictures, Bhandarkar Entertainment
N O V	7	EMI - Liya Hai Toh Chukana Parega	Saurabh Kabra	Sanjay Dutt, Arjun Rampal, Urmila Matondkar, Malaika Arora, Ashish Chaudhary, Neha Oberoi, Manoj Joshi	Comedy, social	Sahara One Motion Pictures, Balaji Motion Pictures, Popcorn Motion Pictures
N O V	7	Ek Vivaah... Aisa Bhi	Kaushik Ghatak	Isha Koppikar, Sonu Sood, Vishal Malhotra, Alok Nath	Drama	Rajshri Productions
N O V	7	Dasvidaniya	Shashant Shah	Vinay Pathak, Neha Dhupia, Rajat Kapoor, Ranvir Shorey	Comedy, drama, musical, romance	One More Thought Entertainment, YT Entertainment, Lemontea Productions, Sikhya Entertainment
N O V	14	Dostana	Tarun Mansukhani	Abhishek Bachchan, John Abraham, Priyanka Chopra, Bobby Deol, Kirron Kher	Comedy	Yash Raj Films, Dharma Productions
N O V	14	Deshdrohi	Jagdish A. Sharma	Kamaal Rashid Khan, Krishna Abhishek, Hrishitaa Bhatt, Gracy Singh, Zulfi Syed	Politics	OK International, PJ Productions
N O V	21	Yuvvraaj	Subhash Ghai	Anil Kapoor, Amy Maghera, Salman Khan, Zayed Khan, Katrina Kaif, Boman Irani, Javed Sheikh, Mithun Chakraborty	Musical, drama, romance, family	Eros International, Mukta Arts
N O V	28	Gumnaam – The Mystery	Neeraj Pathak	Mahima Chaudhry, Dino Morea, Suman Ranganathan, Irrfan Khan	Thriller, mystery	Atlantic Films, Subhir S Mukherjee Productions
N O V	28	Oye Lucky! Lucky Oye!	Dibakar Banerjee	Abhay Deol, Neetu Chandra, Paresh Rawal, Manu Rishi, Richa Chadda, Archana Puran Singh	Comedy, drama	UTV Motion Pictures
N O V	28	Sorry Bhai!	Onir	Shabana Azmi, Boman Irani, Sanjay Suri, Sharman Joshi, Chitrangada Singh	Romance	Pooja Entertainment, Mumbai Mantra Media, Anticlock Films
D E C	5	Maharathi	Shivam Nair	Paresh Rawal, Naseeruddin Shah, Neha Dhupia, Om Puri, Boman Irani, Tara Sharma	Thriller	Shree Ashtavinayak Cine Vision
D E C	5	Dil Kabaddi	Anil Sharma (Senior)	Irrfan Khan, Rahul Bose, Rahul Khanna, Konkona Sen Sharma, Soha Ali Khan, Payal Rohatgi	Comedy, romance	Indian Films, Studio 18, Parmahans Creations
D E C	5	Meerabai Not Out	Chandrakant Kulkarni	Mahesh Manjrekar, Mandira Bedi, Eijaz Khan, Anupam Kher	Drama	Columbia Pictures, Pritish Nandy Communications, DQ Entertainment
D E C	5	Oh, My God	Saurabh Shrivastava	Vinay Pathak, Saurabh Shukla, Divya Dutta, Gaurav Gera, Harsh Chhaya	Comedy	
D E C	12	Rab Ne Bana Di Jodi	Aditya Chopra	Shah Rukh Khan, Anushka Sharma, Kajol, Bipasha Basu, Preity Zinta, Lara Dutta, Vinay Pathak, Isha Koppikar, Rani Mukherjee, Manmeet Singh, Richa Pallod, M. K. Raina	Comedy, drama, romance	Yash Raj Films
D E C	19	Wafaa	Rakesh Sawant	Rajesh Khanna, Laila Khan, Shahib Chopra, Diya Hayat, Tinnu Anand, Sudesh Berry	Romance, drama, Romance	True Life Production
D E C	25	Ghajini	A. R. Murugadoss	Aamir Khan, Asin, Khalid Siddiqui, Jiah Khan, Riyaz Khan, Sunil Grover, Tinnu Anand, Pradeep Rawat	Action, drama, mystery, romance, thriller	Indian Films, Big Pictures, Geetha Arts
D E C	25	Jumbo	Kompin Kemgumnird	Akshay Kumar, Lara Dutta, Amar Babaria, Dimple Kapadia, Rajpal Yadav, Gulshan Grover	Animation	The Weinstein Company, The Jim Henson Company Discoveries, Percept Picture Company, Kantana Animation Studios

== See also ==
- List of Hindi films of 2009
- List of Hindi films of 2007
