= Race 3 =

2018 Indian film by Remo D'Souza

- Theatrical release poster
- Directed by: Remo D'Souza
- Written by: Shiraz Ahmed; Kiran Kotrial
- Produced by: Ramesh S. Taurani; Salman Khan
- Starring: Anil Kapoor; Salman Khan; Bobby Deol; Jacqueline Fernandez; Daisy Shah; Saqib Saleem
- Cinematography: Ayananka Bose
- Edited by: Rameshwar S. Bhagat
- Music by: Songs: Meet Bros; Vishal Mishra; JAM8; Vicky-Hardik; Shivay Vyas; Gurinder Seagal; Background Score: Salim–Sulaiman
- Production companies: Salman Khan Films; Tips Industries
- Distributed by: Salman Khan Films; Tips Industries; Yash Raj Films; Phars Film
- Release date: 15 June 2018
- Running time: 159 minutes
- Country: India
- Language: Hindi
- Budget: ₹150−180 crore
- Box office: est. ₹295–303 crore

Race 3 is a 2018 Indian Hindi-language action thriller film directed by Remo D'Souza and produced by Ramesh Taurani and Salman Khan under Tips Industries and Salman Khan Films. The film stars an ensemble cast of Anil Kapoor, Salman Khan, Bobby Deol, Jacqueline Fernandez, Daisy Shah, and Saqib Saleem. It serves as the standalone sequel and third installment of the Race film series which started with Race (2008) and Race 2 (2013).

Race 3 was released on 15 June 2018, coinciding with Eid. The film was panned by critics for its script, plot, casting, dialogues, performances, music, and action sequences. However, it had a moderate run at the box-office collecting ₹1.79 billion (equivalent to ₹2.6 billion or US$27 million in 2026) in India and approximately ₹3.03 billion (equivalent to ₹4.4 billion or US$46 million in 2026) worldwide.

== Plot ==
Shamsher Singh is a powerful Indian arms dealer in Abu Dhabi and owns a private island, Al-Shifa, for trading arms. Sikander “Sikku” Singh is Shamsher's stepson. Yash, Shamsher's assistant, is a close associate at Shamsher's empire, and Raghuvendra "Raghu" Singh, is the personal assistant and close confidante to Shamsher. In a flashback scene, it is revealed that Rana Singha is Shamsher's business rival, who creates problems for Shamsher's family and his business. As Sanjana and Sooraj, Shamsher's children, reach 25 years old, their family lawyer explains their deceased mother's will. As per the will, the twins are entitled to 50% of the property and 50% of the shares as joint partners (25% each), and the remaining 50% for Sikander. This disparity causes the twins to hate Sikander even more as Shamsher preferred Sikander over the twins. Shamsher tells both of them that Sikander is the son of Shamsher's elder brother, Ranchor Singh, who was actually CEO of Al-Shifa.

In a flashback, that portrays the Handia village of the 1970s, the history of the Singh family is depicted. Both the Singh brothers used to supply weapons to Indian army. Local politicians of Handia asked them for illegal weapons, to which Ranchor refused. His refusal caused a rivalry with a local politician, Gajendra Pathak. One day, during an ambush on an arms truck which was owned by Ranchor's company, Gajendra's son Narendra was killed by Ranchor. Ranchor then died when his car was blown-up by a bomb. The arms company owned by the Singh family was declared to be an anti-state organization and accused of supplying weapons to terrorists. Shamsher sent Sikander to Beijing for studies and took Sikander's widowed mother Sumitra to Al-Shifa. After a year, the twins were born.

In present-day Al-Shifa, one night, Yash talks about his girlfriend. Sikander reveals that in Beijing, he fell in love with a girl named Jessica who severed ties with him. Shamsher's childhood friend Brijmohan tells him that his friend's hotel was used by politicians for their lascivious motives where all the activity was captured on a spy video camera and stored on a hard disk. The hard disk was kept in a bank locker in Cambodia. Shamsher appoints Sikander to recover the hard disk, and he promises to get the disk. The next day, during a party, it is revealed that Jessica is actually Yash's girlfriend. Sikander and Jessica meet privately in the security room. The next day, Sooraj and Sanjana, who had recorded the Sikander-Jessica meet, screen the video to Yash. A furious Yash goes to Jessica's apartment and finds Sikander present with her. Sikander later tells him that both of their past interactions with Jessica were planned by Sooraj and Sanjana, as part of their plan to destroy Sikander. Yash teams up with Sikander against the twins but pretends to be with the twins as well. Sikander, the twins, Yash and Jessica, execute the mission to recover the hard disk.

After retrieving the hard disk, Shamsher eliminates Sikander by planting explosives in his car and heads to a conference with the politicians whose objectionable videos were stored on the disk. Shamsher tells of Sikander's death to the politicians, in the presence of the twins. He then plugs the hard disk and is shocked to find out that the disk was not the original one. Rather, it only contained a video, self-filmed by Sumitra before her death, in which she reveals the truth that Ranchor was killed by Shamsher, and the twins were Ranchor's kids. Sikander arrives, and reveals that he knew that Shamsher killed his dad, but kept it a secret for ten years and had been pretending to be loyal to Shamsher. Before Sikander's arrival, Shamsher reveals that Yash is his real son to the twins before beating them up. After a fight in the desert between Sikander and Yash, Sikander demolishes Shamsher's entire army and makes both Yash and Shamsher surrender to Jessica who happens to be an Interpol officer. The arrested father-son duo are flown to their native village Handia.

In the climax, Sikander reveals that he had been planning events all along and revealed all the plans and secrets to the twins and Jessica. Shamsher is seen bribing a police officer, while Yash is seen to be toning his body inside the prison cell. Sikander, reuniting with his twin siblings in Al-Shifa, reveals the plot of handing over the original hard disks to Jessica. Sikander makes a metaphorical statement and calls himself the "Tiger" of a new race as he refuses to elaborate.

== Cast ==
- Anil Kapoor as Shamsher Singh: Ranchor's brother; Sumitra's second husband; Sikander, Suraj and Sanjana's uncle; Yash's father
- Salman Khan as Sikander "Sikku" Singh: Sumitra and Ranchor's elder son; Suraj and Sanjana's brother
- Bobby Deol as Yash Singh: Shamsher's son
- Jacqueline Fernandez as Interpol officer Jessica Gomes: Sikander's love interest
- Daisy Shah as Sanjana Singh: Sumitra and Ranchor's daughter; Sikander's younger sister and Suraj's twin sister
- Saqib Saleem as Suraj Singh: Sumitra and Ranchor's younger son; Sikander's younger brother and Sanjana's twin brother
- Freddy Daruwala as Rana Singha: Shamsher's enemy and later partner
- Sharat Saxena as Raghuvendra "Raghu" Sinha a.k.a. Sexy Uncle: Bodyguard of Singh Family
- Rajesh Sharma as Brijesh a.k.a. Brij Mohan: Shamsher's childhood friend
- Nishigandha Wad as Sumitra Singh: Ranchor's widow; Shamsher's second wife; Sikander, Sanjana and Suraj's mother
- Milind Gunaji as Ranchor Singh: Shamsher's brother; Sumitra's first husband; Sikander, Sanjana and Suraj's father
- Narendra Jha as Interpol officer Vikram Khanna
- Chaitanya Kanhai as Narendra Pathak: Gajendra's son
- B. K. Tiwari as Gajendra Pathak: Narendra's father and a powerful politician in Handia

== Production ==
=== Development ===
In the year 2015, it was confirmed by director-duo Abbas–Mustan that a third instalment in the Race franchise was being planned with Saif Ali Khan returning in the lead role. In 2016, it was reported that producer Ramesh Taurani had approached Salman Khan for Race 3, however, he asked Taurani to make some changes in the script. This report was confirmed to be true by Khan himself at the trailer launch event of the film on 15 May 2018. In August 2017, it was reported that Khan had agreed to be a part of Race 3 on the condition that choreographer-turned-director Remo D'Souza would direct the film. In August 2017, it was reported that Saif had decided not to be a part of the film as he was opposed to the idea of him playing a parallel lead to Salman. After media reports surfaced about Katrina Kaif, Jacqueline Fernandez, and Deepika Padukone being considered for the female lead opposite Khan, it was confirmed during August 2017 that Fernandez had been finalised for the role. To prepare for the action sequences that she had to do in the film, Fernandez underwent extensive training in mixed martial arts (MMA).

=== Filming ===
The shooting of Race 3 began on 9 November 2017 at the Mehboob Studios in Mumbai. The filming of Race 3 moved to Bangkok in Thailand for its second schedule where they filmed a song and an action sequence, which was choreographed by Anal Arasu, at the Floating Market and Rose Garden as well as the jungles of Kanchanaburi Province. After finishing the shoot in Thailand, the team reached Abu Dhabi for its next schedule. The shooting schedule in Abu Dhabi lasted for 35 days where filming was done at Emirates Palace, Yas Viceroy Abu Dhabi, The St. Regis Abu Dhabi, Abu Dhabi National Exhibition Centre, Emirates Steel and the Liwa Desert. The action sequences in Abu Dhabi were choreographed by Tom Struthers, who has previously worked on movies like Inception, The Dark Knight and Dunkirk. For its next schedule, the film unit moved to Kashmir and later on to Ladakh where Salman Khan and Jacqueline Fernandez filmed a romantic song. During the shooting, Khan was convicted in the Blackbuck poaching case on 5 April 2018 by a Jodhpur Sessions Court, as a result of which the remaining patchwork of the film was completed in Jaisalmer, Rajasthan instead of Abu Dhabi because the film was running behind its schedule and Jaisalmer had a landscape similar to that of Abu Dhabi.

== Soundtrack ==
The music of the film is composed by Meet Bros, JAM8, Vishal Mishra, Vicky-Hardik, Shivay Vyas, and Gurinder Seagal, while the lyrics are penned by Salman Khan, Kumaar, Hardik Acharya, Shabbir Ahmed, Shloke Lal, Shivay Vyas, Shanky, Rimi Nique, Kunaal Vermaa and Raja Kumari. The background score is composed by Salim–Sulaiman. The songs featured in the film are sung by Atif Aslam, Iulia Vantur, Deep Money, Neha Bhasin, Kamaal Khan, Amit Mishra, Jonita Gandhi, Sreerama Chandra, Raja Kumari, Mika Singh, Salman Khan, Veera Saxena, Shivai Vyas, Gurinder Seagal, Payal Dev and Vishal Mishra. The first song of the film titled as "Heeriye", which is sung by Deep Money, Neha Bhasin and Kamaal Khan was released on 18 May 2018. The second song of the film to be released was "Selfish", which is sung by Atif Aslam and Iulia Vantur and was released on 25 May 2018. The third song of the film, "Allah Duhai Hai", which is sung by Amit Mishra, Jonita Gandhi, Sreerama Chandra and rapped by Raja Kumari was released on 1 June 2018. The fourth track, "Party Chale On", which is sung by Mika Singh and Iulia Vantur, was released on 8 June 2018. The album of the film was released by Tips Music on 12 June 2018.

Track listing
No.	Title	Lyrics	Music	Singer(s)	Length
1.	"Heeriye"	Kumaar	Meet Bros	Deep Money, Neha Bhasin, Kamaal Khan	5:05
2.	"Selfish"	Salman Khan	Vishal Mishra	Atif Aslam, Iulia Vantur	4:57
3.	"Allah Duhai Hai" (Original composition by Pritam)	Shabbir Ahmed, Shloke Lal, Rap lyrics: Raja Kumari	Recreated by: Tushar Joshi (JAM8)	Amit Mishra, Jonita Gandhi, Sreerama Chandra, Rap: Raja Kumari	4:43
4.	"Party Chale On"	Hardik Acharya	Vicky-Hardik	Mika Singh, Iulia Vantur	4:03
5.	"I Found Love"	Salman Khan	Vishal Mishra	Salman Khan, Veera Saxena	4:51
6.	"Ek Galti"	Shanky, Shivai Vyas	Shivai Vyas	Shivai Vyas	3:57
7.	"Saansain Hui Dhuan Dhuan"	Kunaal Vermaa, Rimi Nique	Gurinder Seagal	Gurinder Seagal, Payal Dev, Iulia Vantur	2:36
8.	"Selfish" (Solo)	Salman Khan	Vishal Mishra	Atif Aslam	4:59
9.	"Selfish" (Unplugged)	Salman Khan	Vishal Mishra	Atif Aslam, Vishal Mishra	5:08
10.	"Race 3 Mashup"	Various	Kiran Kamath	Various	4:13
11.	"Selfish" (Solo)	Salman Khan	Vishal Mishra	Stebin Ben	3:34
Total length:					44:32

== Reception ==
=== Critical response ===
On the review aggregator website Rotten Tomatoes, 13% of 15 critics' reviews are positive, with an average rating of 3.1/10.

Rachit Gupta of The Times of India gave the film 2/5 stars and said, "Race 3 just doesn't work up the feeling of suspense and intrigue that made the previous masala movies from the franchise a guilty pleasure". Rohit Vats of Hindustan Times gave film 1/5 stars and called it a "mere show-reel... poorly directed, with a ridiculous plot and sub-par acting, this is a new high for the superstar..... It's really difficult to sit through 160-minutes of terribly bad film-making". Rajeev Masand of News18, too, gave it 1/5 star and said the film is "complete drivel".

Although Meena Iyer of DNA praised introduction of characters, she still criticised the film saying, "Race 3 is boasting of being an intelligible film which has been made to clear the cobwebs in your mind", and rated the film 2/5. Anita Iyer of Khaleej Times gave it 1.5/5 and felt that the film falls short of expectations. Swetha Ramakrishan of Firstpost called it "funny, kitschy and audacious".

Film Companion's film critic Anupama Chopra gave it 2/5 stars saying that the storytelling was sacrificed at the altar of Salman Khan. Joe Laydon of Variety wrote about the film, "This in-name-only Bollywood sequel delivers fast and furious action, spirited song and dance, but way too many narrative speed bumps". Saibal Chaterjee of NDTV gave the film 1.5/5 stars praising its climax, and calling the rest "clue stuntman". Shreehari H of Qrius remarked the film to be one of the worst films of the year where Salman Khan seemed to be rather like a pterodactyl whose airborne exploits would have shamed many winged dinosaurs.

Sukanya Verma of Rediff.com gave no stars to the film and wrote, "Race 3 doesn't merely demand you to leave your brains behind but guarantees you won't find them anywhere even after the ordeal is over". Priyadarshini Patya of MensXP.com rated the film 1/5 and said, "Race 3 is just Salman Khan's business, none of the viewers' business". Sonal Dehdia of Mid-Day gave the film 1/5 stars and said, "There are two pehlus (aspects) to this film too – first, it is atrocious and second, it will mint money at the box-office nonetheless". Dhavesh Sharma of Filmfare gave the film 3/5 stars and wrote, "A dysfunctional, ultra rich family, shady deals, fast cars, high speed chases, sassy women, macho men and enough plot twists to make Abbas Mustan go groggy with delight, Race 3 has all these and more'.

Bollywood Hungama gave the film 2/5 stars and write, "On the whole, RACE 3 is high on style and low on substance". Ritika Handoo of Zee News, giving it 2.5/5 stars, said, "the action thriller lacks depth". Namrata Joshi of The Hindu criticized the film as a "compendium of inanities" and that the songs resembled standalone music videos. Shilpa Jamkhandikar of Reuters described the film as "a minefield of meme-worthy moments, replete with hilarious dialogue, a plot ripe for parody and abysmal acting". Umesh Punwani of Koimoi gave the film 2/5 stars and said, "On the whole Race 3 is not entirely unentertaining but it is majorly disappointing". Manjusha Radhakrishan of Gulf News gave the film 1.5/5 stars and called it "doomed adventure".

Stutee Gosh of The Quint gave the film 1/5 stars and said "The moments of lull are so many in this 159-minute-long Race 3 that we develop a strange detachment from the on-screen proceedings". Suprana Sharma of Deccan Chronicle gave the film 1/5 stars calling it " a slow, dim-witted crawl to nowhere". Rohit Bhatnagar of Deccan Chronicle noted it to be an ''illogical yawn-fest'', located too distant from reality and as Salman's worst act, ever. Nandini Ramnath of Scroll.in criticized the film and noted that ''Even die-hard fans will find the going tough....Remo, (who) appears to have been too much in awe of his leading man to have actually given him any basic instructions on the sets....''. Udita Jhunjhunwala of Livemint noted it to be a long film completely devoid of any minimal science or logic and with shoddy dance routines grooved on pedestrian lyrics.

Tanul Thakur of Wire.in noted the film to be a garden variety shoddy joke, suffocated with numerous out-of-sync twists, disregarding logic, flow, and consistency. Priyanka Bhadani of the Week.in gave the film 1/5 stars noting it to a logic defying bad spoof of a spoof with a cringe-worthy script and where Salman Khan got reduced to a caricature of his real life persona.

The film made to multiple lists for being one of the worst films of the year with one remarking it to have "insulted the audience's intelligence".

=== Box office ===
==== Domestic ====
The film released on 4300 screens and collected ₹ 285.0 million on opening day in India becoming one of the biggest opener of the year. The film became Salman Khan's 4th highest opening day grosser collecting approximately ₹291.7 million (equivalent to ₹430 million or US$4.4 million in 2026), after Prem Ratan Dhan Payo, Tiger Zinda Hai, and Sultan.

==== Overseas ====
On opening day, the film collected US$127,510 (₹8.73 million) from 49 screens in Australia, US$68,779 (₹4.71 million) from 27 screens in New Zealand, US$337,080 (₹23.0 million) from 137 screens in the United Kingdom, US$477,511 (₹32.6 million) from 281 screens in the United States, and US$10,371 (₹710,000) from 6 screens in Canada. On second day the film collected US$143,302 (₹9.75 million) from 51 screens in Australia, US$77,619 (₹5.28 million) from 30 screens in New Zealand, US$412,036 (₹28.0 million) from 136 screens in the UK, US$512,914 (₹34.9 million) from 283 screens in the United States and US$9,230 (₹628,000) from 5 screens in Canada. On the first Sunday, the film collected US$45,905 (₹3.12 million) from 28 screens in Australia and US$71,217 (₹4.85 million) from 26 screens in New Zealand. In 4 days, the film grossed ₹449.7 million (equivalent to ₹660 million or US$6.8 million in 2026) overseas.

The film was temporarily banned by the Pakistan Central Board of Film Censors so that four big banner Pakistani films and other smaller regional language releases on Eid do good business without competition from Bollywood movies at the box office.
