= Karl Wine =

- Born: September 27, 1990 (age 35); French Guiana
- Other names: Mr. International
- Occupation: Singer
- Musical career
- Genres: Reggaeton; Dancehall; Afrohouse
- Instruments: Vocals
- Website: karlwine.com

Karl Wine (born October 27, 1990) is a French singer. He is known for his multi-genre musics.

== Discography ==
=== Singles ===
Year	Song	Featuring Artist(s)	Label	Notes	Ref.
2018	"Bam Digi Bam"		Basshall Records	Debut	
2020	"Baila"	Tampa Curhat, Tribal Kush	Tunecore	Top 10 TikTok songs of 2020	
2020	"Me Gusta"	Mc Morena	Nara Music		
2021	"Bam Digi Bam Pt. 2"	Bigg Frankii, Dj Wayne	Basshall Records	remix of "Bam Digi Bam"	
2022	"Bum Bum"	Jeyce Guerrero, Jason XM	The Orchad SONY, Nara Music		
2022	"PASSA PASSA"	MB Ghetto Flow	Nara Music		
2023	"Oh Na Na"	John Roa	Nara Music		
2024	"Tu Besos"	Freebot, Cuvan, Aneth	Throne Music & Ascend4m		
2024	"Oh Na Na (Nepali Version)"	Sushan KC, Yabesh Thapa			
2024	"LA FORMULA"	Kushal Pukhrel, MB Ghetto Flow			
2024	"PAISA"	Kushal Pukhrel			
2024	"Friendzone"	Bilygane, Yohan			
2025	"BESOS"	Shreya Ghoshal	Play DMF	Features Jacqueline Fernandez and Shikhar Dhawan in music video	
2025	"Oh Na Na (Khasi Version)"	Frenzy, Wanbhaa, Jeolan, Wanjop	Nara Music		
2025	"HMM HMM HMM"	Limitlezz, Fernandez	Nara Music, Throne Music		

=== Albums ===
Year	Album title	Songs	Featuring Artist(s)	Label	Notes	Ref.
2024	Supernatural	"Supernatural"		The Orchad Enterprises		
2024	Supernatural	"Miranda Cosgrave"		The Orchad Enterprises		
2024	Supernatural	"Silence"		The Orchad Enterprises		
2024	Supernatural	"Le pessé"		The Orchad Enterprises		
2024	Big Motion	"Big Motion Intro"	God Wonder, Lkhn, Its Natascha	Nara Music		
2024	Big Motion	"Big Motion"	God Wonder, Lkhn	Nara Music		
2024	Big Motion	"Gulabi"	God Wonder, Lkhn, Aishwarya Anand	Nara Music		
2024	Big Motion	"Exclusivamente"	God Wonder, Lkhn	Nara Music		
2024	Big Motion	"Numba One"	God Wonder, Lkhn	Nara Music		
2024	Big Motion	"Doucement"	God Wonder, Lkhn	Nara Music		
