= Race (2008 film) =

2008 Indian film by Abbas-Mustan

- Theatrical release poster
- Directed by: Abbas–Mustan
- Screenplay by: Shiraz Ahmed
- Dialogues by: Jitendra Parmar; Anurag Prappana
- Story by: Shiraz Ahmed
- Produced by: Ramesh S. Taurani; Kumar S. Taurani
- Starring: Anil Kapoor; Saif Ali Khan; Akshaye Khanna; Bipasha Basu; Katrina Kaif; Sameera Reddy
- Narrated by: Anil Kapoor
- Cinematography: Ravi Yadav
- Edited by: Hussain A. Burmawala
- Music by: Songs: Pritam; Background Score: Salim–Sulaiman
- Production company: Tips Industries
- Distributed by: UTV Motion Pictures
- Release date: 21 March 2008
- Running time: 155 minutes
- Country: India
- Language: Hindi
- Budget: ₹46 crore
- Box office: ₹103.45 crore

Race is a 2008 Indian Hindi-language neo-noir action crime film directed by Abbas–Mustan and written by Kiran Kotrial and Shiraz Ahmed. Reportedly inspired by the 1998 Hollywood movie Goodbye Lover, it is the first installment in the Race franchise and stars an ensemble cast of Anil Kapoor, Saif Ali Khan, Akshaye Khanna, Bipasha Basu, Katrina Kaif, and Sameera Reddy. In the film, the professional and personal loyalties between brothers and businessmen Ranveer Singh (Saif Ali Khan) and Rajiv Singh (Akshaye Khanna) are shown as a storyline.

Principal photography took place in Durban, Goa and Dubai, and was produced by Tips Industries. Race was theatrically released in India by UTV Motion Pictures on 21 March 2008. The film received critical acclaim, with praise for its editing, screenplay, cast performances and music. It was a commercial success, grossing ₹103 crore (US$11 million) worldwide, making it the sixth highest grossing Hindi film of 2008. It was followed by the sequel film Race 2 (2013) and the spiritual successor Race 3 (2018).

== Plot ==
A voice-over by Inspector Robert D'Costa "RD" (Anil Kapoor) introduces the four main characters. Ranveer "Ronny" Singh (Saif Ali Khan) is a successful and powerful businessman who runs a ranch house, Stallions, in Durban and fixed many horse races using the finest breed (mainly Thoroughbreds) of horses. He likes to take part in adventure sports. His younger brother Rajiv Singh (Akshaye Khanna) is an alcoholic and has no interest in the business. Ronny is dating an upcoming model, Sonia Martin (Bipasha Basu), while his personal assistant Sophia Sharma (Katrina Kaif) appears to be secretly in love with him. Ronny is also involved in a competition with his business rival, Kabir Ahuja (Dalip Tahil), who is also a horse race fixer.

The film opens with a murder plot involving a car accident on 7 October that Ronny narrowly survives. Ronny later kills his unfaithful jockey, who had been bribed by Kabir, and destroys Kabir when the latter offers to buy his company, which is in debt.

Rajiv drunkenly confesses to Ronny that he likes Sonia and would quit drinking for her. Ronny stops dating her, and Rajiv and Sonia begin dating until, in a twist, Rajiv reveals that he knows of Sonia's shady past and plans to use her. His father had secured huge life insurance policies on each of the sons, and he wants to kill Ronny and inherit $100 million in insurance payments. Sonia agrees to help in exchange for $20 million.

They pretend to get married; as per Rajiv's instructions, Sonia seduces Ronny, who confesses he loved her all along. Rajiv's plan is to threaten suicide in response to Sonia and Ronny's affair by leaping off a tall building and getting Sonia to push Ronny off. It turns out Ronny was aware of the plan, as Sonia had been keeping him updated, having always been in league with him. They scheme to kill Rajiv. Sonia double-crosses Ronny and pushes him off instead, saying she loved him, but the money was more important. As RD investigates the death, Sophia reveals that she was married to Ronny, leaving Sonia shocked since Sophia is now the heir to the insurance money. In another twist, Sophia was in on the plan too and is Rajiv's secret girlfriend. Rajiv plans to bump off Sonia after he and Sophia get the money and live a luxurious life. RD figures out that Sophia had faked her marriage with Ronny, and he had been tricked into signing the marriage certificate. RD confronts Rajiv and agrees to remain silent in exchange for $25 million.

Rajiv hires the same hitman who had attempted to murder Ronny in the beginning to kill Sonia, revealing that he had been behind the first murder attempt too. However, Ronny reappears and rescues her, killing the hitman. Ronny confronts Rajiv and Sophia. He had overheard Rajiv discussing the failed murder attempt with the hitman and had been playing along the whole time so he could get the insurance money from his own faked death along with the insurance money from Rajiv's death. He allows Rajiv one last chance to win by agreeing to a car race. Ronny and Sonia show up in a yellow Toyota Supra, and Rajiv and Sophia in a blue Nissan Skyline. When Rajiv protests, he switches cars with Ronny. Rajiv anticipated the switch and had destroyed the Nissan's brakes. In the middle of the race, Ronny tells Rajiv that he planted a bomb in his car, and it will detonate if Rajiv slows below 100 kmph.

As the race continues, the two cars dodge obstacles. As they reach a parking lot, Rajiv attempts to cross a ramp to overtake Ronny. This causes the Supra to crash into a caravan, topple over, and knock into a petroleum tank, killing Rajiv and Sophia. After Ronny and Sonia narrowly escape death, Ronny confesses to Sonia that there was no bomb in the car and Rajiv killed himself. He also expresses his grief in realising that while he raced with honesty, Rajiv continued to deceive him until his last breath.

In the end, Ronny collects the insurance money from Rajiv and Sophia's deaths, along with the money from his own faked death. He attempts to flee the city with Sonia, but RD stops them. The two are revealed to be childhood friends, and RD was working with Ronny all along in exchange for more money. Ronny gives RD a briefcase with a bomb. The bomb does not detonate, and Ronny explains that it was to prevent RD from killing Ronny and taking all the money.

== Cast ==
- Anil Kapoor as Inspector Robert “RD” D'Costa
- Saif Ali Khan as Ranveer “Ronny” Singh, Rajiv's elder brother; main protagonist
- Akshaye Khanna as Rajiv Singh, Ronny's younger brother; Sophia's secret boyfriend;main antagonist
- Bipasha Basu as Sonia Martin/Sonia Ranveer Singh, an upcoming model Ronny's love interest, Rajiv's fake wife
- Katrina Kaif as Sophia Sharma/Sophia Rajiv Singh, Ronny's secretary, Rajiv's secret lover turned wife (voice dubbed by Smita Malhotra)
- Sameera Reddy as Mini D'Souza, RD's assistant and love interest
- Dalip Tahil as Kabir Ahuja, Ranveer's biggest rival
- Kiku Sharda as Sam, Ranveer's assistant
- Johnny Lever as Max, marriage bureau chief (cameo appearance)
- Gurpreet Ghuggi as police officer (cameo appearance)

== Production ==
=== Source material and influences ===
The movie was loosely inspired by the 1998 American thriller/comedy Goodbye Lover. Apart from the basic plot, notable similarities were observed in several supporting characters as well. Actors Saif Ali Khan and Bipasha Basu later acknowledged the resemblance to the Hollywood film, and Basu subsequently worked with Goodbye Lover’s director Roland Joffé in The Lovers (2013), who reportedly expressed frustration when she discussed Race with him.

=== Casting ===
The casting of Race was marked by several notable changes. Initially, Ajay Devgn was approached to portray Inspector Robert D'Costa (RD). Although he appreciated the script, Devgn declined the role as he wasn't inclined towards participating in an intense action film at that time.

Akshay Kumar was offered the role of Ranveer Singh, while Saif Ali Khan was considered for the role of Rajiv Singh. However, Kumar turned down the offer, reportedly due to unreported reasons. Subsequently, Khan expressed interest in playing Ranvir Singh, the elder brother, leading to his casting in that role. Bobby Deol Was the first choice for the role of Ranveer Singh.

For the character of Sonia, Priyanka Chopra was the initial choice. She declined the role, as she was not keen on portraying a character with negative shades at that point in her career. The role eventually went to Bipasha Basu.

Fardeen Khan was originally signed to play Rajiv Singh. However, due to scheduling conflicts with his commitments to the film Heyy Babyy (2007), he had to opt out. Following this, John Abraham, Vivek Oberoi, and Abhishek Bachchan were considered for the role, but none took it up. Ultimately, Akshaye Khanna was cast as Rajiv Singh. Nonetheless, Abraham was cast in the sequel in a completely different role.

== Soundtrack ==
The soundtrack of Race was released by Tips Music on 25 January 2008. Composed by Pritam with lyrics by Sameer, Race had 7 original songs, 9 remixes and an instrumental theme. The song "Khwab Dekhe (Sexy Lady)" sung by Monali Thakur and Neeraj Shridhar was recorded after the release of the soundtrack, replacing the original song "Mujh Pe Toh Jadoo" in the film. Tips then re-distributed the soundtrack, adding "Khwab Dekhe (Sexy Lady)" after the release of the film. All the remix versions were produced by DJ Suketu feat.

== Reception ==
=== Critical reception ===
Race received acclaim from critics, with praise for its stylized presentation, music, and plot twists.

Taran Adarsh of IndiaFM gave Race 4 out of 5 stars, calling it "a superb entertainer all the way" that "has not just style, but a lot of substance too." Rajeev Masand of CNN-IBN gave it 3 out of 5 stars, describing it as a mix of "fast cars and fast babes" and noting it was "better than anything else its directors have made recently." He suggested that audiences "won’t be disappointed."

The Economic Times stated that Race is "reasonable enough to win a 'not bad' stamp" but "isn't imaginative enough to gain a 'good' tag." The review criticized the outdated action sequences and inconsistent camerawork, though it acknowledged that the film's racy ending helped to camouflage its narrative flaws. Khalid Mohamed of Hindustan Times described the film as "an absolutely average Abbas–Mustan plot pourri."

Raja Sen of Rediff.com gave Race 1.5 out of 5 stars, calling it a "carnival of twists." He further criticized the film as "boringly shot" and "shabbily edited." Kathy Gibson of Access Hollywood rated the film 1.5 out of 4 stars. She found the plot twists "ridiculous" and their explanations even worse, adding that the stunts were "more laughable than exciting." She concluded that "not Anil Kapoor’s humorous portrayal of a quirky, fruit-eating detective can save Race."

=== Box office ===
Race was released worldwide on 21 March 2008, coinciding with the Holi festival weekend. It earned approximately ₹6.20 crore on its opening day, followed by ₹6.80 crore on the second day and ₹7.50 crore on the third, bringing its opening weekend total to ₹20.50 crore.

The film concluded its theatrical run with a domestic net gross of ₹60.83 crore and a worldwide gross of ₹103.45 crore, ranking as the fifth-highest-grossing Hindi film of 2008. According to Box Office India, Race was declared a "Hit."

== Accolades ==
Award	Date of the ceremony	Category	Recipients	Result	Ref.
Screen Awards	14 January 2009	Best Actor (Popular)	Saif Ali Khan	Nominated	
Screen Awards	14 January 2009	Best Actress (Popular)	Bipasha Basu	Nominated	
Screen Awards	14 January 2009	Best Actor in a Negative Role	Akshaye Khanna	Won	
Screen Awards	14 January 2009	Best Screenplay	Shiraz Ahmed	Won	
Stardust Awards	15 February 2009	Best Film of the Year	Race	Nominated	
Stardust Awards	15 February 2009	Best Director	Abbas–Mustan	Nominated	
Stardust Awards	15 February 2009	Actor of the Year – Male	Saif Ali Khan	Nominated	
Stardust Awards	15 February 2009	Best Supporting Actor	Anil Kapoor	Nominated	
Stardust Awards	15 February 2009	Best Actor in a Negative Role – Male / Female	Akshaye Khanna	Nominated	
Stardust Awards	15 February 2009	Best Actor in a Negative Role – Male / Female	Katrina Kaif	Nominated	
Stardust Awards	15 February 2009	New Musical Sensation – Female	Monali Thakur (for "Zara Zara Touch Me")	Nominated	
Filmfare Awards	28 February 2009	Best Music Director	Pritam	Nominated	
Filmfare Awards	28 February 2009	Best Screenplay	Shiraz Ahmed	Nominated	
IIFA Awards	11–13 June 2009	Best Film	Race	Nominated	
IIFA Awards	11–13 June 2009	Best Actress	Bipasha Basu	Nominated	
IIFA Awards	11–13 June 2009	Best Performance in a Comic Role	Anil Kapoor	Nominated	
IIFA Awards	11–13 June 2009	Best Performance in a Negative Role	Akshaye Khanna	Won	
IIFA Awards	11–13 June 2009	Best Music Director	Pritam	Nominated	
IIFA Awards	11–13 June 2009	Best Lyricist	Sameer (for "Pehli Nazar Mein")	Nominated	
IIFA Awards	11–13 June 2009	Best Male Playback Singer	Atif Aslam (for "Pehli Nazar Mein")	Nominated	
IIFA Awards	11–13 June 2009	Best Female Playback Singer	Monali Thakur (for "Zara Zara Touch Me")	Nominated	
IIFA Awards	11–13 June 2009	Best Story	Shiraz Ahmed	Nominated	
IIFA Awards	11–13 June 2009	Best Sound Re-Recording	Leslie Fernandes	Won	
Producers Guild Film Awards	5 December 2009	Best Actress	Bipasha Basu	Nominated	
Producers Guild Film Awards	5 December 2009	Best Supporting Actress	Katrina Kaif	Nominated	
Producers Guild Film Awards	5 December 2009	Best Music Director	Pritam	Nominated	
Producers Guild Film Awards	5 December 2009	Best Male Playback Singer	Atif Aslam (for "Pehli Nazar Mein")	Nominated	
Producers Guild Film Awards	5 December 2009	Best Female Playback Singer	Monali Thakur (for "Zara Zara Touch Me")	Nominated	
Sabsey Favourite Kaun Awards	27 December 2009	Sabsey Favourite Film	Race	Nominated	
Sabsey Favourite Kaun Awards	27 December 2009	Sabsey Favourite Director	Abbas–Mustan	Nominated	
Sabsey Favourite Kaun Awards	27 December 2009	Sabsey Favourite Hero	Saif Ali Khan	Nominated	
Sabsey Favourite Kaun Awards	27 December 2009	Sabsey Favourite Heroine	Katrina Kaif	Won	
Bollywood Hungama Surfers' Choice Movie Awards	29 January 2010	Best Film	Race	Nominated	
Bollywood Hungama Surfers' Choice Movie Awards	29 January 2010	Best Director	Abbas–Mustan	Nominated	
Bollywood Hungama Surfers' Choice Movie Awards	29 January 2010	Best Actor	Saif Ali Khan	Nominated	
Bollywood Hungama Surfers' Choice Movie Awards	29 January 2010	Best Actress	Bipasha Basu	Nominated	
Bollywood Hungama Surfers' Choice Movie Awards	29 January 2010	Best Supporting Actress	Katrina Kaif	Nominated	
Bollywood Hungama Surfers' Choice Movie Awards	29 January 2010	Best Actor in a Negative Role	Akshaye Khanna	Nominated	
Bollywood Hungama Surfers' Choice Movie Awards	29 January 2010	Best Music Director	Pritam	Nominated	
Bollywood Hungama Surfers' Choice Movie Awards	29 January 2010	Best Song	"Khwab Dekhe (Sexy Lady)"	Nominated	

== Sequel ==
The original production team announced a sequel titled Race 2. Saif Ali Khan and Anil Kapoor reprised their roles from the first film, while John Abraham, Deepika Padukone, Jacqueline Fernandez, and Ameesha Patel joined the cast in new roles. Bipasha Basu also returned for a cameo appearance as Sonia. Principal photography began on 5 October 2011. The film was released theatrically on 25 January 2013 and was a commercial success, earning over ₹1 billion (US$12 million) at the domestic box office.
