= Samar Khan =

Pakistani cyclist

- Born: 11 August 1990; Khas Dir, Khyber Pakhtunkhwa
- Education: Applied Physics
- Alma mater: Federal Urdu University of Arts, Sciences & Technology, Islamabad
- Occupation: Adventure Athlete
- Notable work: First woman in the world to cycle atop the 4,500-meter-high Biafo Glacier in the Karakorum Mountains of Gilgit-Baltistan. First Pakistani to have cycled on the 'Roof Of Africa', Uhuru Peak, Kilimanjaro.

Samar Khan is a Pakistani adventure athlete. She is the first woman in the world to have cycled on the third largest non-polar glacial system, Biafo Glacier and Godwin Austen Glacier in the Karakoram mountains of Gilgit Baltistan.

She is also the first Pakistani to have cycled on the roof of Africa, Kilimanjaro, in 2017. When her sports were not comprehended in her own country, ESPNW Global Sports Mentoring Program selected her to be mentored by top sports executives in United States and after getting mentored by Burton Snowboards in Vermont, she not only excelled as a snowboarder but also founded her initiative ‘Samar Camp’, in which she offers sports camps like mountain biking, backpacking and snowboarding for girls and women in Pakistan.

Samar Khan has won a silver medal in Sadia Khan championship in 2022 and became a winner of Redbull Homerun snowboarding category in 2021.

She is also the summiteer of a virgin peak of 5610m in Shimshal, Gilgit Baltistan with a snowboarding descent, the mountain later named after her as ‘Ghar e Samar’(Pashto).

She is a Tedx speaker, ‘Pride of Pakistan’ 2021 and also a former goodwill ambassador of WWF Pakistan.

She is awarded by numerous national and international platforms like Pakistan Super League (PSL), Women Sports Alliance and Conclave Pakistan for her work in adventure sports.

Samar was invited to United States by ESPNW Global Sports Mentoring Program in 2022 to celebrate the 50th Anniversary of Title IX with the global sports fraternity. She met First Lady of United States of America, Jill Biden and Billie Jean King. She was also awarded a sports entrepreneurship certification course by Babson College, Boston.

== Early life and education ==
Khan belongs to Khas Dir, Khyber Pakhtunkhwa. She holds a master's degree in applied physics from Federal Urdu University. She discovered her love for sports in Army School of Physical Training, Kakul, from where she learned Para-gliding.

== Achievements ==
In July 2016, Khan became the first woman in the world to cycle atop 4,500-metre-high Biafo Glacier in the Karakoram Mountains of Gilgit-Baltistan. She discovered her passion for action sports in 2015, after her cycling trip to highest international border, Khunjerab. The Biafo Glacier is the world's third longest glacier outside the polar regions.

- A certified paraglider from Army School of Physical Training, Kakul.
- A multiple times speaker at Tedx.
- Former goodwill ambassador WWF Pakistan.
- Alumna of ESPNW Global Sports Mentoring Program.
- Mentee of Burton Snowboards.
- Represented Pakistan in BRICS & SCO Student Spring Festival & Conference, Stavropol, Russia.
- She’s covered by multiple international news platforms like ESPNW, BBC Urdu, Voice of America(VOA), Al- ghad tv, Iran international, Khaleej Magazine, Independent Urdu and Redbull.
- Awarded as ‘Sports Women of the year’ in 2019 by Chief Minister Punjab.
