= Jacqueline Fernandez =

Sri Lankan actress (born 1985)

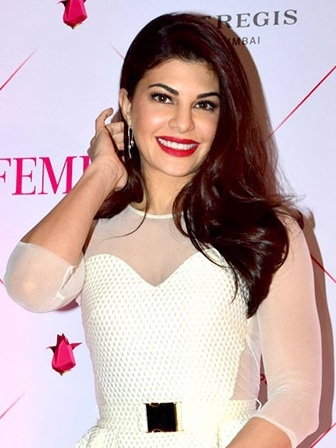
- Fernandez in 2017
- Born: Jacqueline Fernandez; 11 August 1985 (age 41); Manama, Bahrain
- Citizenship: Sri Lanka
- Education: University of Sydney (BA)
- Occupation: Actress
- Years active: 2009–present
- Title: Miss Universe Sri Lanka 2006

Jacqueline Genevieve Fernandez (born 11 August 1985) is a Sri Lankan actress based in India. She has worked in Indian films, predominantly in Hindi, besides appearing in reality shows and music videos. Fernandez was born and raised in Bahrain. After graduating in mass communication from the University of Sydney and working as a television reporter in Sri Lanka, she joined the modelling industry. She was crowned Miss Universe Sri Lanka in 2006, and represented her country at Miss Universe 2006.

While on a modelling assignment in India in 2009, Fernandez successfully auditioned for Sujoy Ghosh's fantasy drama Aladin, which marked her acting debut and won her the IIFA Award for Star Debut of the Year – Female. Fernandez had her breakthrough role with the psychological thriller Murder 2 (2011), her first commercial success. This was followed by glamorous roles in the commercially successful ensemble-comedy Housefull 2 (2012) and the action thriller Race 2 (2013), the former garnered her an IIFA Award for Best Supporting Actress nomination. Fernandez went on to star in the top-grossing action films Kick (2014) and Vikrant Rona (2022), and the comedies Housefull 3 (2016) and Judwaa 2 (2017).

Alongside her screen acting career, Fernandez has worked as a judge in the ninth season of the dance reality show Jhalak Dikhhla Jaa (2016–2017), is a popular celebrity endorser for various brands and products, has participated in stage shows, and is active in humanitarian work.

== Early life and modelling career ==
Jacqueline Fernandez was born on 11 August 1985, in Manama, Bahrain, and was raised in a multi-ethnic family. Her father, Elroy Fernandez, is a Sri Lankan Burgher, and her mother, Kim, is of Malaysian and Canadian descent. Her maternal grandfather is Canadian and her great-grandparents were from Goa, then part of Portuguese India (now in India). Her father, who was a musician in Sri Lanka, moved to Bahrain in the 1980s to escape civil unrest between the Sinhalese and Tamils and subsequently met her mother, who was an air hostess. She is the youngest of four children with one elder sister and two elder brothers. After receiving her early education in Bahrain at Sacred Heart School, she studied mass communication at the University of Sydney in Australia. After graduating she did a few television shows in Sri Lanka. She also attended the Berlitz school of languages, where she learned Spanish and improved her French and Arabic. Her mother Kim died on 7 April 2025 after suffering a stroke.

According to Fernandez, she had aspired to become an actress at a young age and fantasized about becoming a Hollywood movie star. She received some training at the John School of Acting. Although she was a television reporter, she accepted offers in the modelling industry, which came as a result of her pageant success. In 2006, she was crowned the winner of the Miss Universe Sri Lanka pageant and represented Sri Lanka at the world Miss Universe 2006 pageant held in Los Angeles. In a 2015 interview, Fernandez described the modelling industry as "a good training ground" and said: "It is a medium that is about shedding your inhibitions, knowing your body, confidence". In 2006, she appeared in a music video for the song "O Sathi" by music duo Bathiya and Santhush and young female singer Umaria Sinhawansa.

== Acting career ==
=== Debut and breakthrough (2009–2013) ===
In 2009, Fernandez travelled to India for a modelling assignment. She successfully auditioned for Sujoy Ghosh's fantasy film Aladin (2009) her acting debut. She played the love interest of Riteish Deshmukh's character, a role based on the character of Princess Jasmine. and Rajeev Masand of CNN-IBN felt that she was: "easy on the eyes and appears confident but has precious little to do". Although the film was a critical and commercial failure, she won the IIFA Award for Star Debut of the Year – Female.

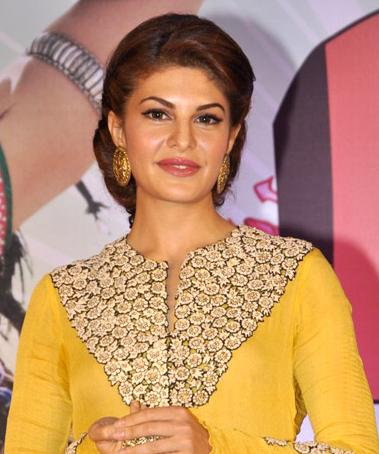
Fernandez at Ramaiya Vastavaiya song launch in 2013

In 2010, Fernandez appeared opposite Deshmukh in the science fiction romantic comedy Jaane Kahan Se Aayi Hai. She was cast as a girl from Venus, who lands on Earth in search of love. The film, along with Fernandez's performance, received poor reviews; Rediff.com's Sukanya Verma noted: "She gamely makes a fool of herself whilst aping the actions of movie stars, ranging from Sridevi's Naagin dance, Mithun Chakravarthy's Disco Dancer moves, to Big B's violent headshake in Hum. Her Tara could be a keeper if only Jaane Kahan Se Aayi Hai wasn't so intent on turning her into a love-struck Barbie." Critic Anupama Chopra also criticized Fernandez, calling her "a pin-prick on a balloon". Later that year, she made a special appearance in the song "Dhanno" for Sajid Khan's comedy Housefull.

Mahesh Bhatt's thriller Murder 2 was Fernandez's first commercial success and marked a turning point in her career. She took on the role of Priya, a lonely model who is in a confused relationship with Arjun Bhagwat (played by Emraan Hashmi). Fernandez was praised for her performance, and for the boldness and sex appeal she displayed in the film. Gaurav Malani of The Times of India stated that she was "tastefully tempting" but noted that her romance with Hashmi was "literally half-baked". The following year, Fernandez appeared in the ensemble comedy Housefull 2 alongside Akshay Kumar, John Abraham, and Asin. It became one of the top grossing productions of India that year and earned ₹1.86 billion (US$19 million) worldwide. Fernandez received mostly negative reviews for her performance. While Gaurav Malani praised her for her looks, NDTV called her a "blathering bimbo" who "find[s] no pleasure in [her role]". Despite the negative reviews, Fernandez received a Best Supporting Actress nomination at the 14th IIFA Awards for her performance.

Fernandez's first release of 2013 was Race 2, an ensemble action thriller (alongside Saif Ali Khan, John Abraham and Deepika Padukone), described as the "cinematic equivalent of a trashy novel" by critic Rajeev Masand. She played Omisha, a femme fatale, a role which required her learn fencing and some acrobatics. The film emerged as a commercial success, with the worldwide gross of more than ₹1.8 billion (US$19 million) and a net domestically of over ₹1 billion (US$10 million). In a particularly scathing review, Saibal Chatterjee of NDTV wrote that both Fernandez and Padukone "strut around like wound-up automatons that are all decked-up but have nowhere to go." Also that year, Fernandez appeared in an item number, titled, "Jaadu Ki Jhappi", for Prabhu Deva's romantic comedy Ramaiya Vastavaiya.

=== Commercial success (2014–2018) ===
In 2014, Fernandez appeared in Sajid Nadiadwala's directorial debut—the action film Kick, a remake of a 2009 Telugu film of same name. She starred opposite Salman Khan, playing Shaina, a psychiatrist. She retained her real voice for the first time in Kick. While Sneha May Francis commented that she is: "incredibly dazzling, and moves like a magic", Raja Sen of Rediff.com was more critical of her dialogue delivery, calling it "unfortunate." The film received mixed reviews from critics, but with worldwide revenue of over ₹3.75 billion (US$39 million), it became the fourth highest-grossing Bollywood film. The film established Fernandez as one of the most popular Bollywood actresses.

In 2015, Fernandez featured in Vicky Singh's Roy, a romantic thriller, which critic Sarita A. Tanwar described as a "boring, exhausting and pretentious" film. Fernandez played dual roles, Ayesha Aamir, a filmmaker in a relationship with another filmmaker (played by Arjun Rampal) and Tia Desai, a girl in love with a thief (played by Ranbir Kapoor). While India TV called it "her best act till date", critic Rajeev Masand felt that she "appears miscast in a part that required greater range." Roy failed to meet its box-office expectations, and was a commercial failure. Later that year, she appeared in a guest appearance for the comedy-satire Bangistan.

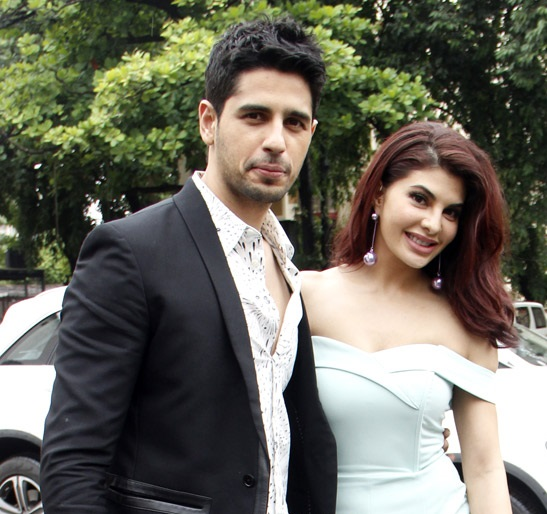
Fernandez at the promotions of A Gentleman with Sidharth Malhotra, 2017

Karan Malhotra's action drama Brothers was Fernandez's next release. Co-starring alongside Akshay Kumar and Sidharth Malhotra, Fernandez played Jenny, a fearless mother struggling for her child, a role which she described as "challenging", "intense", and "difficult". The role marked a departure from the glamorous characters that she had a reputation for portraying. Dhriti Sharma of Zee News called her character "soft, timid and promising", and praised her for: "convincingly pull[ing] off a pleasing character of a street fighter's wife". Film critic Subhash K. Jha noted that she: "...in a limited role gives her finest emotive shot", while critic Raja Sen remarked: "[she] plays Kumar's long-sobbing wife who gets so deliriously happy on seeing a text message that it may well have contained news about a Kick sequel." Later that year, she starred in the horror thriller Definition of Fear, which marked her Hollywood debut.

Fernandez began 2016 with a role in Housefull 3 which is the third instalment to the Housefull Series'. The ensemble comedy film paired her with Akshay Kumar as her love interest. The critic for Firstpost was disappointed with the picture and criticized Fernandez for her inclination towards a film, where she is treated as nothing more than a "visual attraction". Nevertheless, the film was a commercial success, grossing ₹1.88 billion (US$20 million) worldwide. Her next film—the action adventure Dishoom—also grossed ₹1.2 billion (US$12 million) worldwide at the box-office. Later that year, she served as a judge to the ninth season of the dance show Jhalak Dikhhla Jaa.

In 2017, Fernandez appeared in Chandran Rutnam's English-Sri Lankan crime-thriller According to Matthew. The film was her maiden cinematic appearance in Sri Lankan cinema as well. The film was released in Sri Lanka on 7 April 2017 in CEL Theatres with the title Anuragini. Her next film was the action-comedy A Gentleman, with Siddharth Malhotra from the director duo Raj Nidimoru and Krishna D.K. The film was poorly received by critics and was a box-office flop. Later that year, she appeared in David Dhawan's comedy film Judwaa 2, opposite Varun Dhawan and Taapsee Pannu. It was a sequel to the 1997 comedy film Judwaa. The film proved to be a box-office success earning ₹2.26 billion (US$23 million) worldwide. In 2018, she starred alongside Salman Khan in Race 3, the third addition to the Race Franchise. Race 3 was a box office success earning more than ₹3 billion (US$31 million) worldwide despite mixed reviews.

=== Career setbacks (2019–present) ===
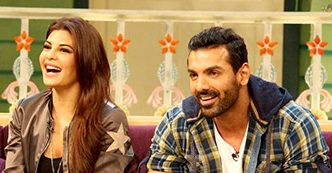
Fernandez and John Abraham on The Kapil Sharma Show.

Fernandez starred opposite Sushant Singh Rajput in Tarun Mansukhani's heist thriller Drive, for which she filmed a song sequence in Tel Aviv in October 2017. The film was the first Hindi production to shoot in Israel and was described by The New Indian Express and Business Standard as marking the beginning of a bond between Bollywood and Israel. She also starred in the Netflix original film, Mrs. Serial Killer, directed by Shirish Kunder. She also featured with Akshay Kumar for the fourth time in a gangster drama Bachchhan Paandey. In 2022, she was featured in the Kannada film Vikrant Rona, which was received mixed to negative reviews from critics.

In 2025, Fernandez appeared opposite Abhishek Bachchan in Housefull 5. The film was released in two versions, titled Housefull 5A and Housefull 5B, each featuring a different climax and murderer. Devesh Sharma stated that she adds to the "glamour quotient", but has nothing to do in the film.

== Personal life and other work ==
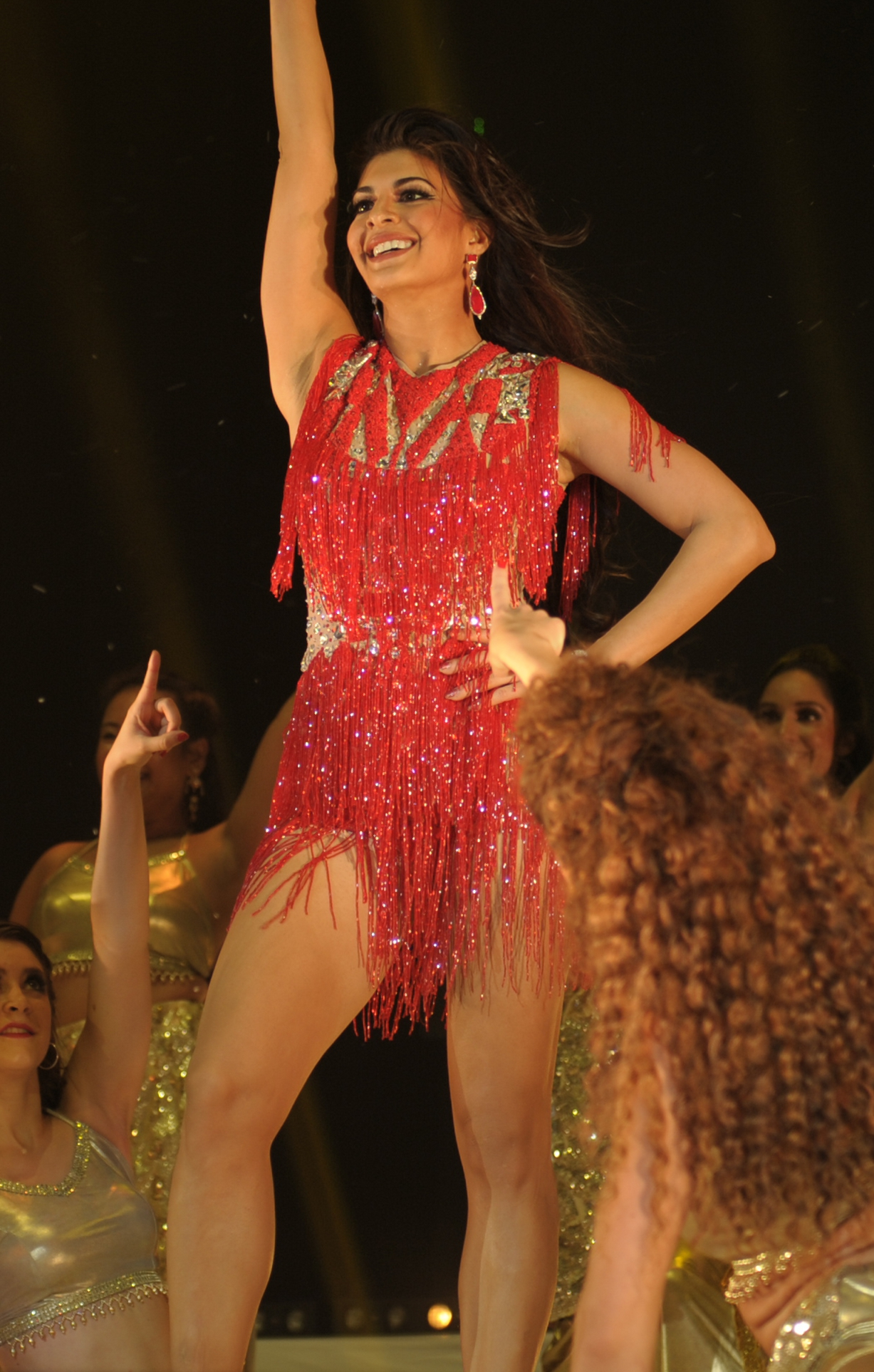
Fernandez performing at Bollywood Showstoppers, 2014

Fernandez shares a close bond with her family, and in 2012 discussed how she misses being around them. In 2014, she stated: "I miss them so much everyday. You don't realise when you live away from home how difficult life can be [...] At the same time, staying away from them has taught me to be more responsible. It has taught me so many things about myself, about priorities and time management."

In 2008, Fernandez started dating Bahraini prince Hassan bin Rashid Al Khalifa, whom she met at a mutual friend's party; they separated in 2011. While filming Housefull 2 in 2011, Fernandez began a romantic relationship with director Sajid Khan. The relationship attracted media coverage in India and there was speculation of an impending wedding. However, the relationship ended in May 2013.

Fernandez was the brand ambassador of the Indian Super League club Delhi Dynamos for the 2017–18 season, where she helped the club in engaging with the fans across the city and country. She was also the first female to be appointed the brand ambassador of an Indian football club.

Fernandez has supported charitable organizations and a number of causes. For advocating the welfare of animals, Fernandez was named "Woman Of The Year" by PETA (India) in 2014. Fernandez is a vegan.

Fernandez has participated in several concert tours and televised award ceremonies. In 2013, she performed at the Temptations Reloaded in Auckland, Perth, and Sydney alongside Shah Rukh Khan, Rani Mukerji, and Madhuri Dixit. She also performed at the live talent show "Got Talent World Stage Live" with Khan, Priyanka Chopra and Varun Dhawan the following year. In July 2014, Fernandez opened a restaurant in Colombo, Kaema Sutra, in collaboration with chef Dharshan Munidasa, which specialises in contemporary Sri Lankan cuisine. In July 2018, Fernandez co-founded her activewear clothing line-up, Just F. In March 2022, Fernandez danced to instant hit "Arabic Kuthu", alongside other actresses, on a TV show.

=== Legal disputes ===
Since December 2021, Fernandez has been a subject of an investigation into a money laundering case involving ₹2 billion. The investigation is being carried out by the Enforcement Directorate (ED) who questioned Fernandez for 10 hours in relation to the case on 9 December 2021. On 22 December, ED rejected Fernandez's request to downgrade the look out circular (LOC) which was issued against her in the case which blocks her to travel outside India. Fernandez was removed from the film The Ghost starring Nagarjuna. It is speculated that the eviction from the film happened due to the money laundering case. On 17 August 2022, the Enforcement Directorate named Fernandez as an accused in the same money-laundering case involving Sukesh Chandrashekhar. In response, she said that FDs were made before having any links with the conman and all her income was legal and tax was also paid on it. On 26 September 2022, at the request of Fernandez's lawyer, the court granted interim bail to Jacqueline on a bail bond of ₹50,000.

== In the media ==
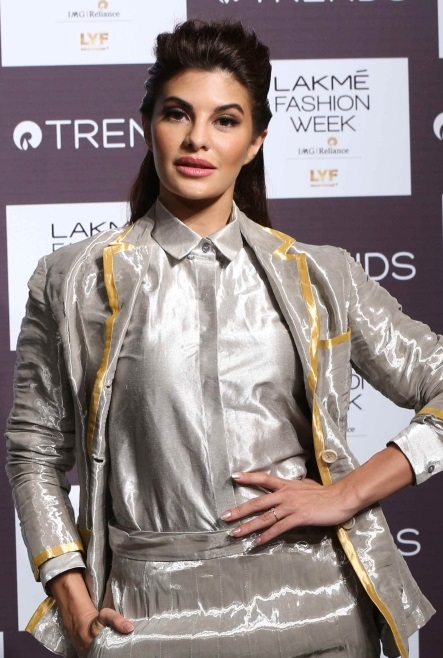
Fernandez at Lakme Fashion Week, 2016

In 2008 and 2011, Fernandez featured in the UK magazine Eastern Eye's "World's Sexiest Asian Women" list, ranking twelfth. She was ranked third on The Times of India's listing of the "Most Desirable Woman" in 2013 and 2014, after being ranked eighth, seventh and fourteenth, respectively, in the preceding three years. In 2013, Rediff.com placed her on their list of "Bollywood's Best Dressed Actresses". The following year, she held the sixty second position in the Indian edition of the Forbes Celebrity 100, a list based on the income and popularity of India's celebrities.

In early 2013, Fernandez became the ambassador for HTC One, which she endorses in India. She was the face of Indian Bridal Fashion Week—IBFW of 2013. Later that year, she became the spokesperson for Gareth Pugh's designed Forevermark Diamonds in Mumbai, and was at the inaugural opening of the Forever 21 store in Mumbai. While analyzing Fernandez's career, India TV noted: "Slowly and steadily Jacqueline Fernandez is climbing up the ladder of success [...] Jacqueline is comfortably grasping every aspect of the work, which an actress is required to do and is accordingly giving results." On the contrary, Charu Thakur of India Today criticized her acting skills, but remarked that: "[she has] managed to find her feet in Bollywood now by banking on glamorous roles".

In 2017, Fernandez invested ₹35 million (US$360,000) in Rakyan Beverages' Raw Pressery. The company claim that with this investment, Fernandez became India's first celebrity to part-finance a consumer products firm.

== Filmography ==
=== Films ===
Key
†	Denotes films that have not yet been released

- All films are in Hindi unless otherwise noted.

Year	Title	Role	Notes	Ref
2009	Aladin	Jasmine		
2010	Jaane Kahan Se Aayi Hai	Tara		
2010	Housefull	Dhanno	Special appearance in song "Aapka Kya Hoga"	
2011	Murder 2	Priya		
2012	Housefull 2	Bobby Kapoor		
2013	Race 2	Omisha		
2013	Ramaiya Vastavaiya	Herself	Special appearance in song "Jadoo Ki Jhappi"	
2014	Kick	Shaina Mehra		
2015	Roy	Ayesha Aamir / Tia Desai		
2015	Bangistan	Rosanna (Rosie)	Cameo appearance	
2015	Brothers	Jenny Fernandes		
2015	Definition of Fear	Sarah Fording	British film	
2016	Housefull 3	Ganga "Gracy" Patel		
2016	Dishoom	Meera Balraj "Ishika" Behl		
2016	A Flying Jatt	Kirti		
2017	According to Matthew	Daphne Reynolds	Sri Lankan film	
2017	A Gentleman	Kavya Chetwani		
2017	Judwaa 2	Alishka Bakshi		
2018	Baaghi 2	Herself	Special appearance in song "Ek Do Teen"	
2018	Race 3	Jessica Gomes		
2019	Saaho	Herself	Simultaneously shot in Telugu; special appearance in song "Bad Boy"	
2019	Drive	Tara Loha		
2020	Mrs. Serial Killer	Sona Mukherjee		
2021	Radhe	Herself	Special appearance in the song "Dil De Diya"	
2021	Bhoot Police	Kanika "Kanu" Kulbhushan		
2022	Bachchhan Paandey	Sophie		
2022	Attack	Ayesha Roy		
2022	Vikrant Rona	Racquel D'Coasta aka Gadang Rakkamma	Kannada film	
2022	Tell It Like a Woman	Divya	American–Italian film	
2022	Ram Setu	Sandra Rebello		
2022	Cirkus	Bindu		
2023	Selfiee	Herself	Special appearance in the song "Deewane"	
2024	Kill 'Em All 2	Vanessa	Direct-to-video American film	
2025	Fateh	Khushi Sharma		
2025	Raid 2	Herself	Special appearance in the song "Money Money"	
2025	Housefull 5	Sasikala		
2026	Welcome to the Jungle	Jenny		

=== Television ===
Year	Title	Role	Notes
2016	Jhalak Dikhhla Jaa	Judge	
2020–present	Fabulous Lives of Bollywood Wives	Herself	Guest appearance
2025	Hai Junoon!	Pearl Saldanha	

=== Music video appearances ===
Year	Title	Singer(s)	Ref.
2016	"GF BF"	Gurinder Seagal	
2020	"Mere Angne Mein"	Neha Kakkar, Raja Hasan	
2020	"Genda Phool"	Payal Dev, Badshah	
2020	"Tere Bina"	Salman Khan	
2021	"Paani Paani"	Aastha Gill, Badshah	
2022	"Mud Mud Ke"	Neha Kakkar, Tony Kakkar	
2024	"Yimmy Yimmy"	Shreya Ghoshal, Tayc	
2025	"Besos"	Shreya Ghoshal, Karl Wine	
2025	"Tik Tik"	DYSTINCT, Vishal Mishra	
2025	"DUM DUM"	Asees Kaur	
2025	"Stormrider"	Amrita Sen	
2025	"Ek Main Aur Ek Tu Hai"	Sunidhi Chauhan	
2026	"Jugni"	Sonu Thukral, B Praak	

=== Discography ===
Year	Song	Singer	Writer(s)	Ref.
2024	"Stormrider"	Jacqueline Fernandez	Amrita Sen, Robin Grubert	

== Awards and nominations ==
Year	Award	Category	Film	Result	Ref.
2010	IIFA Awards	Star Debut of the Year – Female	Aladin	Won	
2010	Stardust Awards	Exciting New Face	Aladin	Won	
2012	Stardust Awards	Best Actress (Thriller/Action)	Murder 2	Nominated	
2013	IIFA Awards	Best Actress in a Supporting Role	Housefull 2	Nominated	
2013	15th Asianet Film Awards	Most Stylish Bollywood Actress	—N/a	Won	
2015	BIG Star Entertainment Awards	BIG Star Most Entertaining Dancer	Kick	Won	
2015	Stardust Awards	Style Diva	Kick	Won	
2015	Screen Awards	Best Actress (Popular Choice)	Kick	Nominated	
2016	Ada Derana Sri Lankan of the Year	Global Entertainer	—N/a	Won	
2016	Stardust Awards	Best Actress	Housefull 3	Nominated	
2016	Stardust Awards	Best Actress	Dishoom	Nominated	
2017	BIG Zee Entertainment Awards	Most Entertaining Actor in a Comedy Film – Female	Housefull 3	Nominated	
2017	BIG Zee Entertainment Awards	Most Entertaining Dancer – Male/Female	A Flying Jatt	Nominated	
2017	BIG Zee Entertainment Awards	Most Entertaining Dancer – Male/Female	Dishoom	Nominated	
2017	Nickelodeon Kids' Choice Awards India	Best Movie Actor (Female)	Judwaa 2	Nominated	

Awards and achievements
Preceded by Rozanne Diasz	Miss Universe Sri Lanka; 2006	Succeeded by Aruni Rajapaksha
