= Race 2 =

2013 Indian film by Abbas–Mustan

- Theatrical release poster
- Directed by: Abbas–Mustan
- Written by: Kiran Kotrial; Shiraz Ahmed
- Produced by: Ramesh S. Taurani
- Starring: Saif Ali Khan; John Abraham; Deepika Padukone; Anil Kapoor; Jacqueline Fernandez; Ameesha Patel; Bipasha Basu
- Narrated by: Anil Kapoor
- Cinematography: Ravi Yadav
- Edited by: Hussain A. Burmawala
- Music by: Songs: Pritam; Score: Salim–Sulaiman
- Production company: Tips Industries
- Distributed by: UTV Motion Pictures
- Release dates: 25 January 2013 (India); 26 January 2013 (Worldwide)
- Running time: 146 minutes
- Country: India
- Language: Hindi
- Box office: ₹173.36 crore

Race 2 is a 2013 Indian Hindi-language neo-noir action crime film directed by Abbas–Mustan and written by Kiran Kotrial and Shiraz Ahmed. The film was produced by Ramesh S. Taurani under the Tips Industries banner, with UTV Motion Pictures serving as distributor and presenter. A sequel to the 2008 film, Race and the second installment of the Race film series. The film stars an ensemble cast of Saif Ali Khan, John Abraham, Anil Kapoor, Deepika Padukone, Jacqueline Fernandez and Ameesha Patel. The music of the film is composed by Pritam. The film was dubbed in Tamil and Telugu.

Made on a budget of ₹94 crore, Race 2 was released on 25 January (India) and 26 January (Worldwide). The film received mixed-to-positive reviews from critics and the audience. It grossed ₹173.36 crore worldwide.

== Plot ==
In Cyprus, a contract killer blasts a yellow Lamborghini Gallardo by shooting its fuel tank.

Few months later, a robbery takes place and European printing plates are stolen. Crooked businessman Ranveer Singh meets a casino owner, Vikram Thapar, claiming he stole the plates. He offers Thapar €1500 million in counterfeit currency in exchange for €500 million in real banknotes. Thapar agrees and borrows €500 million from his friend Armaan Malik, who is a powerful don and the leader of the powerful Turkish mafia. It is then revealed that Ranvir never stole the plates, and cheated Thapar. Unable to return Armaan's money, Thapar is forced to give control of his five casinos to him.

Ranveer and Armaan planned the whole scam. They met through Ranveer's childhood friend retired police inspector Robert "RD" D'Costa. Ranvir delivers Thapar's casinos for €500 million to Armaan by taking 10% from it. Ranveer meets Armaan's step-sister Aleena, and gradually becomes attracted to her.

Ranveer sees a picture of his deceased wife Sonia in Armaan's girlfriend Omisha's wallet and begins to woo her in order to gain her confidence. Ranvir reveals to RD that he is trying to bankrupt Armaan because Armaan and Thapar were responsible for Sonia's death.

In a flashback, Ranveer and a pregnant Sonia are in Cyprus. Sonia's sister Tanya calls them to meet her in Bangkok. On the way, Ranveer needs to transfer some savings from the bank. Unaware of an assassin lurking around, he asks Sonia to wait in the car. The assassin successfully shoots the car's fuel tank (the Lamborghini blasting scene at the beginning of the film), killing Sonia. Ranveer chased the assassin and killed him. Omisha claims that she is Sonia's sister, Tanya Martin. However, it is revealed this is a lie and a ploy by Armaan, who knew Ranveer's true intentions.

Ranveer schemes to steal the Shroud of Turin and sell it to Armaan. After that, he will steal both the shroud and Armaan's wealth. However, RD, who is afraid of Armaan, betrays Ranveer and tells the truth to Armaan. Armaan gives 15 billion euros to his old friend, godfather Anza, as an investment. But Anza demands Armaan that he will only give money, if Armaan defeats Anza's fighter Typhoon. Armaan agrees and defeats Typhoon in the fight.

Aleena reveals Armaan planted a bomb in her car to kill her, and decides to help Ranveer. Ranveer steals the shroud, while Armaan defeats Typhoon. During the celebration, Aleena poisons Ranveer. As he slowly dies, Armaan reveals he knew his plan and Aleena was never on Ranveer's side. After Ranveer dies, Armaan and Omisha retrieve the shroud and leave in their private jet. Armaan points his gun at Aleena, revealing that he had been planning to kill her to take her share of their combined wealth. Unexpectedly, Ranveer crashes through the wall; Aleena never poisoned him. Aleena tells Armaan that she was helping Ranveer, and knew about Armaan's intention to eliminate her. Ranveer reveals that RD never betrayed him and it was a ploy to trick Armaan into thinking he was ahead of Ranveer.

Ranveer and Armaan fight in the aircraft. Armaan tells Ranveer that he killed Sonia because she fled away with his money. He shoots the pilot and escapes with Omisha through a parachute, leaving Ranveer and Aleena to die in the resulting plane crash. However, they manage to escape by using Armaan's Audi R8 car, which has four attached parachutes. Armaan and Omisha hand over the shroud to Anza. On inspection, it is revealed to be fake. When Anza asks for his bearer bonds, they're also fake. Ranveer calls Armaan and taunts him that he is penniless now. It is also revealed that Anza is secretly helping Ranveer and Armaan is forced to hand over his properties, while Omisha dumps him for Anza. Armaan vows vengeance on Ranveer.

Ranveer visits Sonia's grave with Aleena and gives RD his share of money. When RD asks about the real shroud, he reveals that he never stole the shroud; it is still in the church. Aleena had switched the real bearer bonds while he and Armaan were fighting on the plane. RD admits that he does not want to risk his life again and makes Ranveer promise in jest to never meet him again. Ranveer wittingly replies that promises are meant to be broken and him and Aleena leave Turkey for an unknown location.

== Cast ==
- Saif Ali Khan as Ranveer “Ronny” Singh
- John Abraham as Armaan Malik
- Anil Kapoor as Inspector Robert D'Costa "RD"
- Deepika Padukone as Aleena Malik, Armaan's step-sister
- Jacqueline Fernandez as Omisha
- Ameesha Patel as Cherry, RD's assistant
- Aditya Pancholi as Godfather Anza
- Rajesh Khattar as Vikram Thapar
- Bipasha Basu as Sonia Martin Singh, Ranveer's late wife (cameo appearance)
- Triptii Dimri as a background dancer in the song “Party On My Mind”

== Production and casting ==
After the success of Race (2008), Ramesh Taurani registered Race 2 as a title and Abbas–Mustan said that they would go ahead with a sequel "if we get a script in place which is even better than the original." The screenplay and story was written by Shiraz Ahmed and Kiran Kotrial who also wrote Race. Saif Ali Khan and Anil Kapoor were the first to sign on in November 2009 and were reported to be the only returning cast members from the first film. In June 2010, John Abraham was signed on to play the antagonist and Kareena Kapoor and Priyanka Chopra were approached to co-star opposite Khan and Abraham respectively. However, Kapoor turned down the role as she didn't want her pairing with Khan to get repetitive; Chopra opted out due to scheduling conflicts. It was also rumoured that Asin Thottumkal had been shortlisted to star alongside Khan; however Padukone was cast. In December 2010, Sonakshi Sinha was cast as a replacement for Priyanka. Chitrangda Singh was approached for a role opposite Anil Kapoor in May 2011 but eventually dropped out for unspecified reasons. Ameesha Patel and Mallika Sherawat were considered for that same role, but it ultimately went to Patel.

"The expectations from Race 2 are humongous and we plan to make it bigger and better than the first part."

— Taurani on Race 2

The film's shooting was set to begin on 5 October 2011 but was postponed to accommodate Deepika Padukone's dates causing scheduling conflicts with Sonakshi Sinha. Sinha's dates conflicted with her filming schedule for Dabangg 2 (2012), forcing her to drop out. In October 2011, Jacqueline Fernandez who had opted out of Krrish 3 (2013) and Raaz 3 (2012) was cast as a replacement for Sinha. Shortly afterwards, it was announced that Bipasha Basu would be reprising her role as Sonia in a cameo appearance and continuing to be role of Khan's wife. Despite rumours suggesting that Bipasha would be sharing screen space with ex-boyfriend John Abraham for the first time after their break-up, but John denied this. Reports have said that after this statement was said Abraham then told Saif that he didn't want to work with Bipasha in the first place. Jamiat Ulama-i-Hind, the largest of Sunni clerics in India, urged PM Manmohan Singh to stop their publication and display of Race 2 posters that featured verses from the Quran.

=== Filming ===
The first Indian schedule began on 5 November 2011 in Mumbai for 15 days, wrapping up on 20 November. Meanwhile, Sanjay Dutt was in talks to join the cast, but he dropped out due to scheduling conflicts. The second schedule commenced on 23 January 2012 in Mumbai. Padukone dropped out within six days because the film was always being rescheduled.

Race 2's producer Ramesh Taurani released a statement to the media deeming Padukone's behaviour as "unethical, unprofessional and unacceptable". Also, it was reported that Asin was offered the role to replace Padukone, although it has been rumoured that she declined the offer, thus avoiding any controversies regarding her and Kapoor. However, Padukone and Taurani agreed on a settlement after much negotiation and the filming continued as planned. Fernandez, Abraham and Padukone joined the cast in May at Istanbul for the third schedule. On 7 October 2012, the shooting was completed. The Mardan Palace in Turkey was the setting for many scenes where it was shown as the home of Padukone and Abraham's characters.

== Soundtrack ==
Race 2

Soundtrack album by Pritam
- Released: 20 November 2012
- Recorded: 2011–2012
- Genre: Film soundtrack
- Length: 19:55
- Label: Tips Music
- Producer: Pritam

Pritam chronology
| Rush (2012) | Race 2 (2012) | Murder 3 (2013) |

The soundtrack was released on 20 November 2012. Film music & soundtrack is composed by Pritam.

The film score is composed by Salim–Sulaiman.

The songs "Lat Lag Gayee", "Be Intehaan", and "Party on My Mind" became extremely popular and were declared as chartbusters. The song "Lat Lag Gayee" was choreographed by Karishma Chavan.

=== Track listing ===
All music is composed by Pritam.

| No. | Title | Lyrics | Singer(s) | Length |
|---|---|---|---|---|
| 1. | "Be Intehaan" | Mayur Puri | Atif Aslam, Sunidhi Chauhan | 4:51 |
| 2. | "Lat Lag Gayee" | Mayur Puri | Benny Dayal, Shalmali Kholgade | 4:40 |
| 3. | "Party On My Mind" | Prashant Ingole , Yo Yo Honey Singh | KK, Shefali Alvares, Yo Yo Honey Singh | 3:42 |
| 4. | "Allah Duhai Hai" | Mayur Puri, Sameer | Atif Aslam, Vishal Dadlani, Anushka Manchanda, Ritu Pathak, Michie One | 4:15 |
| 5. | "Be Intehaan (Unplugged)" | Mayur Puri | Rahul Vaidya | 2:27 |

=== Reception ===
The soundtrack received positive critical reception. IBN Live gave it 4/5 stars saying, "Race 2's soundtrack is racy to the core. In a nutshell, the album is bound to be an All Time Blockbuster. Let's just hope the movie is as good as the soundtrack is!" Shresht Poddar, of Score magazine, gave the album 3/5 stars saying, "Personally, as a standalone album with no biases, it is enjoyable, but it could have done with better lyrics. The tracks are foot-tapping, and they would appeal to the masses. But if you compare it to Race, the album undoubtedly falls flat."

== Release ==
Race 2 was released in 3200 screens in India; it is the third biggest release ever for a Hindi film after Ek Tha Tiger (2012) (3300 screens) and Dabangg 2 (2012) (3700 screens). Race 2 was released in more than 50 countries, including US, UK, Gulf, Australia, Pakistan as well as non-traditional markets like Maldives, East Timor, Myanmar, Morocco and Vietnam (with as many as seven screens). The film had a simultaneous release in Morocco in four to five screens, including theatres in Casablanca and Marrakesh. Race 2 is subtitled in Arabic, Thai, Indonesian, Malay, Vietnamese, and Dutch.

== Critical reception ==
Race 2 received mixed to positive reviews from critics and audience. While its cast performance, cinematography, visualisation, technical aspects, songs, background scores and direction received critical acclaim, its writing, plot and humours received criticism and most of the critics states that it is not that much as its first part. On the review aggregator website Rotten Tomatoes, 0% of 6 critics' reviews are positive, with an average rating of 3.5/10.

Madhureeta Mukherjee of The Times of India rated the film 3 out of 5, while commenting, "Mass dialogue delivery, heists, fully anti-hero characters, glamorous and sexy heroines, roulette, luxury and exotic cars, gizmos, and gangs – Director duo, Abbas-Mustan have thrown in everything with pompous grandeur, save for a riveting plot that shocks or stuns." Rubina A Khan of The First Post gave it 3 out of 5 stars, adding, "Race 2 delivers what it promises – good looking and anti hero ensemble cast, exotic locations, luxurious cars, bomb squads, revenge, lust and love, a couple of good and preppy style music tracks and, most importantly, a plot which opens a thrilling pace." Shivesh Kumar of IndiaWeekly awarded the movie 3.8 out of 5 stars.

Taran Adarsh of Bollywood Hungama gave 4 out of 5 stars and said "The writing isn't watertight, the film lacks a hit score, the climax is far from effective and overall, Race 2 pales in comparison to Race." Rajeev Masand of CNN-IBN awarded it a score of 3.5 out of 5 while commenting "The film has no intellectual pretensions; its only ambition is to offer a good time. In that, it mostly succeeds." Anupama Chopra of Hindustantimes gave 4.8 out of 5, reviewing, "Race 2 is essentially a big-budget film in which coolness is all. The director duo Abbas–Mustan have no pretensions about what they are making – full-on masala with a dash of revenge, a slice of heist and characters who are either strutting their chiseled bodies in slow motion or betraying each other." Saibal Chatterjee of NDTV gave it a score of 4.5 out of 5 and feels "This is a movie strictly for action who might be looking for a feverish two-and-a-half-hour ride that is far more giddy than heady."

== Box office ==
=== India ===
Race 2 had what Box Office India called a "solid opening" at multiplexes and single screens with occupancy of around 60%–70%. The film had a very good opening day, netting ₹15.12 crore (US$1.6 million). It showed good growth in its second day, collecting approximately ₹20.7 crore (US$2.1 million) nett and ₹15.55 crore (US$1.6 million) on third day. Race 2 did well on its first weekend by collecting around ₹51.35 crore (US$5.3 million) nett.

The film managed to do well and netted around ₹76.1 crore (US$7.9 million) in its first week. Race 2 went on to collect a total gross of ₹139.51 crore (US$14 million) in India with a worldwide gross business of ₹173.36 crore (US$18 million).

=== Overseas ===
Race 2 had a good opening in overseas with approximately ₹75.0 million (US$780,000) the opening weekend. Race 2 grossed approximately $5.5 million overseas in ten days. After grossing $6 million in 17 days overseas, the film was declared a hit by Box Office India. Race 2 recorded similar figures in overseas markets like its prequel. Moreover, it recorded the highest ever collection in Pakistan for any Bollywood film with an amount of $775,000 beating Don 2 which netted $675,000. Its final business in the overseas market is around $6.5 million.

== Game ==
Race 2, a racing mobile video game developed by Gameshastra was released along with the 2013 film.

== Standalone sequel ==
After making two successful films, makers planned the third Installment of this series, which is the standalone sequel to the first two films and will feature a whole new star cast, with the exception of Anil Kapoor and Jacqueline Fernandez. Salman Khan, Bobby Deol, Saqib Saleem and Daisy Shah were some of the new faces in the series and Remo D'Souza replaced Abbas–Mustan as the director of Race 3. But, the film, which was released on 15 June 2018, received highly negative reviews from critics and audiences and is considered one of Bollywood's worst films.
