= Abbas–Mustan =

Indian filmmaker duo (born 1950)

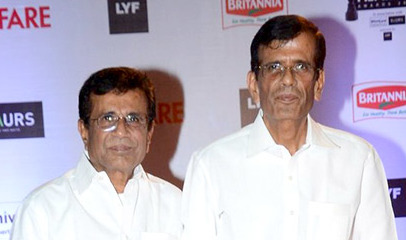
- Abbas-Mustan in 2016
- Born: 1950 (age 75–76); Mumbai, Maharashtra, India
- Occupations: Film directors, producers
- Years active: 1985–present

Abbas–Mustan are an Indian filmmaker duo consisting of brothers Abbas Alibhai Burmawalla and Mustan Alibhai Burmawalla, working in Hindi cinema and known for directing stylish suspense, action and romantic thrillers with dark-lit themes.

== Early life and career ==
Abbas Burmawalla, Mustan Burmawalla, and their brother Hussain Burmawalla began their career as editors in films. They later joined as assistant director of Govindbhai Patel to do several films. When Patel refused an opportunity to direct the Gujarati film Sajan Tara Sambharana (1985), Abbas–Mustan received their first break to direct the movie, launching their career.

Their first Hindi movie as directors was Agneekaal in 1990. Since then, they have directed more than 14 Hindi movies. They eventually launched their own production house called Burmawalla Partners.

The Asian Academy of Film & Television honoured both of them with the Life Membership of International Film and Television Club.

== Filmography ==
Key
†	Denotes films that have not yet been released

Year	Title	Directors	Producers	Inspired from	Notes
1985	Sajan Tara Sambharna	Yes	No		Gujarati film
1987	Moti Veerana Chowk	Yes	No		Gujarati film
1990	Agneekaal	Yes	No		
1992	Khiladi	Yes	No	Khel Khel Mein	
1993	Baazigar	Yes	No	A Kiss Before Dying	
1996	Daraar	Yes	No	Sleeping with the Enemy	
1998	Soldier	Yes	No		
1999	Baadshah	Yes	No	Nick of Time	
2001	Chori Chori Chupke Chupke	Yes	No		
2001	Ajnabee	Yes	No	Consenting Adults	
2002	Humraaz	Yes	No	A Perfect Murder	
2004	Taarzan: The Wonder Car	Yes	No	Christine	
2004	Aitraaz	Yes	No	Disclosure	
2006	36 China Town	Yes	No	Once upon a Crime	
2007	Naqaab	Yes	No	Dot the i	
2007	Evano Oruvan	No	Yes	Falling Down	
2008	Race	Yes	No	Goodbye Lover	
2009	Life Partner	No	Yes		
2012	Players	Yes	Yes	The Italian Job	
2013	Race 2	Yes	No		
2015	Kis Kisko Pyaar Karoon	Yes	Yes		
2017	Machine	Yes	Yes		
2025	Kis Kisko Pyaar Karoon 2	No	Yes		
2026	3 Monkeys †	Yes	Yes		
TBA	Teesvi Manzil †	Yes	No		Completed
