= List of awards and nominations received by Bipasha Basu =

Bipasha Basu awards and nominations
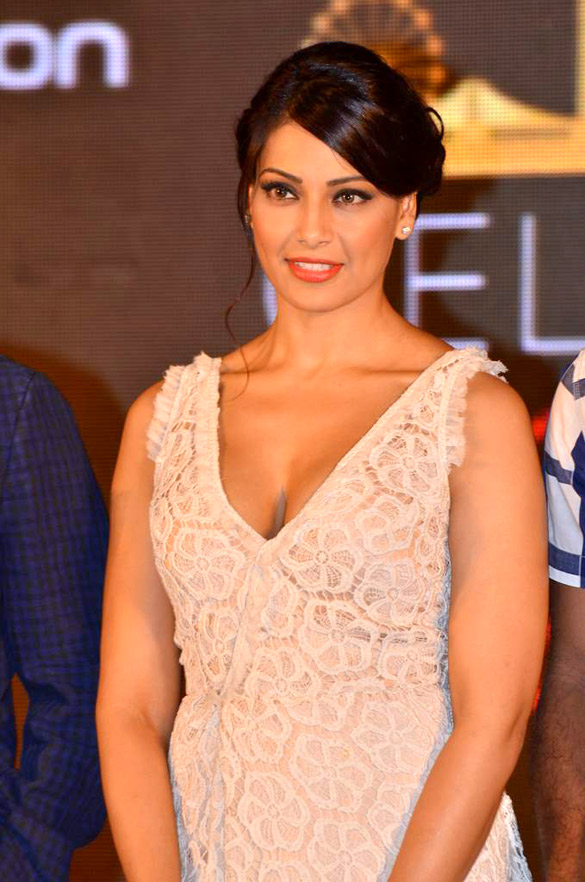
- Basu at a press meet for the 13th IIFA Awards in 2012
Awards and nominations
Award	Wins	Nominations

Totals (Note: Certain award groups do not simply award one winner. They acknowledge several different recipients, have runners-up, and have third place. Since this is a specific recognition and is different from losing an award, runner-up mentions are considered wins in this award tally. For simplification and to avoid errors, each award in this list has been presumed to have had a prior nomination.)
- Wins: 38
- Nominations: 71

Bipasha Basu is an Indian actress who appears in Hindi language films. She has also worked in Telugu, Bengali and Tamil language films.

She debuted in a negative role in Ajnabee (2001) which earned her the Filmfare Award for Best Female Debut. Her first commercial success was Raaz (2002). She was then noticed for her bold role in the erotic thriller film, Jism (2003). She starred in top-grossing films like – No Entry (2005), Phir Hera Pheri, Dhoom 2 (both 2006) – her biggest commercial success till date and Race (2008). Her performances in Apharan (2005), Corporate (2006) and Bachna Ae Haseeno (2008) won her multiple nominations for several awards. She then appeared in commercially successful films such as All the Best: Fun Begins (2009), Raaz 3 (2012). She made her international film debut with the 2013 Australian film The Lovers. She was one of the leading and highest-paid actresses of Bollywood from 2000-2009.

She has been nominated twice for the Filmfare Award for Best Actress and the Filmfare Award for Best Supporting Actress three times along with one nomination for the Filmfare Award for Best Performance in a Negative Role. Roles apart, she is renowned for her item songs like "Phoonk De" in No Smoking (2007), and "Beedi" and "Namak Ishq Ka" in Omkara (2006) amongst others.

== Filmfare Awards ==
Year	Film	Category	Result
2001	Ajnabee	Best Female Debut	Won
2002	Raaz	Best Actress	Nominated
2003	Jism	Best Villain	Nominated
2005	No Entry	Best Supporting Actress	Nominated
2006	Corporate	Best Actress	Nominated
2008	Bachna Ae Haseeno	Best Supporting Actress	Nominated

== Stardust Awards ==
Year	Film	Category	Result
2002	Ajnabee	Best Supporting Actress	Nominated
2008	Bachna Ae Haseeno	Best Supporting Actress	Nominated
2008	—N/a	Fashion Icon	Nominated
2011	Aakrosh	Best Actress in a Thriller or Action	Nominated
2011	Lamhaa	Best Actress in a Drama	Nominated
2012	Dum Maaro Dum	Best Actress in a Thriller or Action	Won
2013	Raaz 3	Best Actress in a Thriller or Action	Nominated
2013	—N/a	Style Icon of the Year	Won

== Star Screen Awards ==
Year	Film	Category	Result
2002	Ajnabee	Best Supporting Actress	Nominated
2003	Raaz	Jodi No. 1 (along with Dino Morea)	Nominated
2007	Corporate	Best Actress	Nominated
2009	Bachna Ae Haseeno	Best Supporting Actress	Nominated
2009	Race	Best Actress (Popular Choice)	Nominated
2010	All the Best: Fun Begins	Best Actress (Popular Choice)	Nominated
2013	Raaz 3	Best Villain	Nominated
2013	Raaz 3	Best Actress (Popular Choice)	Nominated

== Zee Cine Awards ==
Year	Film	Category	Result
2002	Ajnabee	Best Female Debut	Nominated
2003	Raaz	Dynamic Duo (with Dino Morea)	Won
2007	Corporate	Best Actor – Female	Nominated
2013	Raaz 3	Best Villain	Nominated

== International Indian Film Academy Awards ==
Year	Film	Category	Result
2002	Ajnabee	Best Debut (shared with Arjun Rampal and Gracy Singh)	Won
2002	Ajnabee	Fresh Face of the Year	Won
2002	Ajnabee	Best Supporting Actress	Nominated
2004	Jism	Best Performance in a Negative Role	Nominated
2007	Dhoom 2	Best Supporting Actress	Nominated
2009	Bachna Ae Haseeno	Best Supporting Actress	Nominated
2009	Race	Best Actress	Nominated
2009	—N/a	Style Diva of the Year	Won
2013	Raaz 3	Best Performance in a Negative Role	Nominated

== Bollywood Movie Awards ==
Year	Film	Category	Result
2002	Ajnabee	Best Debutan	Nominated
2003	Jism	Best Villain	Won
2007	Corporate	Best Actress	Won

== Star Guild Award ==
Year	Film	Category	Result
2008	Race	Best Actress in a Leading Role	Nominated
2013	Raaz 3	Best Actor in a Negative Role	Nominated

== Global Film Awards ==
Year	Film	Category	Result
2006	Corporate	Best Actress	Won
2006	Corporate	Critics Award for Best Actress	Won
2006	Omkara	Best Supporting Actress	Nominated
2012	Dum Maaro Dum	Best Actress	Nominated
2012	—N/a	Gitanjali Style Icon	Won

== BIG Star Entertainment Award ==
Year	Film	Category	Result
2013	Raaz 3	Most Entertaining Actress in a Thriller Film	Nominated
2013	Raaz 3	Most Entertaining Film Actor – Female	Nominated

== Anandalok Puraskar Awards ==
Year	Film	Category	Result
2006	Corporate	Best Actress	Won
2009	Bachna Ae Haseeno	Best Actress	Won

== Annual Central European Bollywood Awards, India ==
Year	Film	Category	Result
2006	Apahran	Best Supporting Actress	Nominated
2007	Corporate	Best Actress	Nominated
2009	Bachna Ae Haseeno	Best Supporting Actress	Won
2009	Bachna Ae Haseeno	Best on Screen Couple(with Ranbir Kapoor)	Nominated
2011	Aakrosh	Best Supporting Actress	Nominated

== Dainik Bhasker Bollywood Web Awards ==
Year	Film	Category	Result
2011	Aakrosh	SuperStar of the Year	Nominated
2012	Dum Maaro Dum	SuperStar of the Year	Nominated
2012	—N/a	Hottie of The Year	Nominated
2013	Raaz3	SuperStar of the Year	Nominated
2013	Raaz3	Antisocial Character of the Year	Won

== Sansui Viewer's Choice Awards ==
Year	Film	Category	Result
2002	Ajnabee	Most Promising Debut Actress	Nominated
2002	Ajnabee	Best Supporting Actress	Nominated

== Bollywood Hungama Surfers choice Movie Awards ==
Year	Film	Category	Result
2009	Race	Best Actress	Nominated
2009	Bachna Ae Haseeno	Best Actress in a Supporting Role	Nominated

== Other awards and recognitions ==
2010	NDTV Indian of the Year - Entertainer of the Decade - Bachna Ae Haseeno	Won
2009	Durban Film Festival Award for Best Actress – Shob Charitro Kalponik	Won
2009	Sabsey Favourite Fashion Icon - Bachna Ae Haseeno	Won
2011	Bramptonshire Walk of Fame – Contribution in Indian Cinema	Won
2013	Cosmopolitan Fun Fearless Awards(Best Performance by an Actor in a Negative Role) Razz3	Won
2013	Kolkata International Film Festival – Pancha Kanya Memorial Honour	Won
2013	Top 99 Most Desirable Women of the World by AskMen.com	Ranked #68
2013	Top 10 Most Desirable Women of the World by Playboy Magazine	Ranked #6
2005 and 2007	Sexiest Woman of Asia by Eastern Eye	Won
2009	Sexiest Woman of Asia by FHM	Won
2013	NDTV Fittest Icon of the Year	Won
2014	Scariest Performer of the Year – South African Horror Fest – Aatma	Won
2013	Best Actress – New York Indian Film Festival – Aatma	Nominated
2005	Top Bollywood Actresses of the Year Reddiff.com	Ranked #6
2006	Top Bollywood Actresses of the Year Reddiff.com	Ranked #4
2008	Top Bollywood Actresses of the Year Reddiff.com	Ranked #1
2010	Top Sexiest Actresses in India of the decade (2000-2010) IMDb.com	Ranked #9
2010	Top Beautiful Actresses in India of the decade (2000-2010) IMDb.com	Ranked #10
2016	GeoSpa asiaSpa Awards - Fitness Icon of The Year - Female	Won
2024	Pride of Bengal - Contribution to Hindi Cinema by Indian Chambers of Commerce Youth Forum	Won
2008	Cosmopolitan Fearless Awards( Most fearless Bollywood Actress)	Won
2013	Times of India Film Awards(Best Performance by an Actor in a Negative Role)Razz3	Nominated
2003	MTV Asia Awards (Style Icon of the year)	Won
2006	MTV Immies Best Performance in a song ( Omkara)	Won
2003	Star Sabsey Nayi Heroine (Raaz)	Won
2006	Star Sabsey Stylish Heroine (Dhoom 2 and Corporate)	Won
2009	Star Sabsey Fit Heroine	Won
2004	Sabsey Favourite Nayi Heronie (Jism)	Won
2004	HT Cafe Film Awards - Best Actress (Jism)	Nominated
2006	Most Amazing Actress – (Pogo voice Awards) – phir Hera Pheri	Nominated
2007	Queen of hearts- All India Filmgoers Awards - Omkara	Won
2003	V Shantaram Awards - Best Actress (Razz)	Nominated
2020	Star Eminence Awards - Best Actress - Dangerous	Nominated
2021	Best Actress in a Web Series - (International Iconic Awards) - Dangerous	Nominated
2015	Bollywood Life Awards - Fittest Actress	Nominated
2024	Most-Loved jodi of the Year (shared with Karan Singh Grover)	Nominated
