= Bipasha Basu filmography =

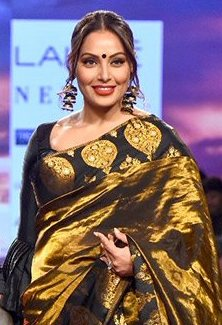
Basu at an event in 2020

Bipasha Basu is an Indian actress who has featured in over 50 films, predominantly in Hindi language. After a successful career as a model, she made her film debut with a supporting role in Abbas–Mustan's thriller Ajnabee (2001), which won her the Filmfare Award for Best Female Debut. Basu followed this with a role in her first Telugu cinema—the action film Takkari Donga (2002). She had her first major success with the supernatural thriller Raaz (2002), which earned Basu her first Filmfare Award for Best Actress nomination. The following year, she starred opposite John Abraham in the erotic thriller Jism, in which she played a seductive wife. She received a Filmfare Award for Best Performance in a Negative Role nomination for the film. Her roles in these films established her as a sex symbol. Basu followed this initial success with roles in a series of commercial failures, including the thrillers Aetbaar, Rudraksh, Rakht—all in 2004—and the romance Barsaat (2005). She later featured in Prakash Jha's crime drama Apaharan (2005) and the ensemble comedy No Entry (2005). The latter emerged as a financial success, grossing ₹750 million (US$7.8 million) at the box office, and Basu's role of an escort earned her a nomination for the Best Supporting Actress at the 51st Filmfare Awards. Basu had seven film releases in 2006. Her role as an executive at a conglomerate in Madhur Bhandarkar's drama Corporate earned her another nomination for the Filmfare Award for Best Actress. She then portrayed a character based on Bianca in Vishal Bhardwaj's Omkara, an adaptation of the Shakespearean tragedy Othello. In Sanjay Gadhvi's action film Dhoom 2—her final release of the year—she played dual roles; it was the top-grossing Bollywood film of the year. In 2008, she collaborated with Abbas–Mustan for the second time for Race. Her performance as a troubled wife in Rituparno Ghosh's 2009 Bengali film Shob Charitro Kalponik was critically acclaimed. (Note: The film marked her debut in Bengali cinema.) She then featured in the third installment of the Raaz series, entitled Raaz 3D (2012). Due to her frequent associations with horror films, she was labelled India's "horror queen" by the media.

In 2013, Basu made her Hollywood debut with the historical romance The Lovers, in which she played a Maratha warrior. The following year, she starred in the comedy Humshakals. The film received largely negative reviews, though it was a moderate commercial success. In 2015, she played conjoined twins—a first for an actress in Bollywood—in the horror film Alone. She followed it by featuring as the host of the television horror series Darr Sabko Lagta Hai that year.

== Films ==
Year	Title	Role	Notes	Ref.
2001	Ajnabee	Neeta / (Fake) Sonia Bajaj	Filmfare Award for Best Female Debut	
2002	Takkari Donga	Panasa	Telugu Film	
2002	Raaz	Sanjana Dhanraj	Nominated—Filmfare Award for Best Actress	
2002	Aankhen	Naina	Special appearance	
2002	Mere Yaar Ki Shaadi Hai	Ria Bhalla		
2002	Chor Machaaye Shor	Inspector Ranjita		
2002	Gunaah	Inspector Prabha Narayan		
2003	Tujhe Meri Kasam	Girija	Special appearance	
2003	Jism	Sonia Khanna	Nominated—Filmfare Award for Best Villain	
2003	Footpath	Sanjana Srivastav		
2003	Rules: Pyaar Ka Superhit Formula	Herself	Special appearance	
2003	Zameen	Nandini Rai		
2004	Ishq Hai Tumse	Khushbu Akhtar		
2004	Aetbaar	Ria Malhotra		
2004	Rudraksh	Dr Gayatri		
2004	Rakht	Drishti Nair		
2004	Madhoshi	Anupama Kaul		
2005	Chehraa	Megha Joshi		
2005	Sachein	Manju	Tamil film	
2005	Viruddh... Family Comes First	—	Cameo appearance	
2005	Barsaat	Anna Virvani		
2005	No Entry	Bobby Saluja	Nominated—Filmfare Award for Best Supporting Actress	
2005	Apaharan	Megha Basu		
2005	Shikhar	Natasha		
2006	Humko Deewana Kar Gaye	Sonia Berry		
2006	Darna Zaroori Hai	Varsha	Story segment: Spirits Do Come	
2006	Phir Hera Pheri	Anuradha "Anu" Munjal		
2006	Alag	Herself	Special appearance in the song "Sabse Alag"	
2006	Corporate	Nishigandha Dasgupta	Nominated—Filmfare Award for Best Actress	
2006	Omkara	Billo Chamanbahar		
2006	Jaane Hoga Kya	Aditi Chopra		
2006	Dhoom 2	ACP Shonali Bose and Monali Bose	Dual role	
2007	Nehlle Pe Dehlla	Pooja Sahni		
2007	No Smoking	—	Special appearance in the song "Phoonk De"	
2007	Om Shanti Om	Herself	Special appearance	
2007	Goal	Rumana Ali Khan		
2008	Race	Sonia Ranveer Singh		
2008	Bachna Ae Haseeno	Radhika Kapoor (Shreya Rathore)	Nominated—Filmfare Award for Best Supporting Actress	
2008	Rab Ne Bana Di Jodi	Sadhana Shivdasani	Special appearance in the song "Phir Milenge Chalte Chalte"	
2009	Aa Dekhen Zara	Simi Chatterjee		
2009	All the Best: Fun Begins	Jhanvi Chopra / (Fake) Vidya Gututo and Andrea	Dual role	
2009	Shob Charitro Kalponik	Radhika Mitra	Bengali film	
2010	Pankh	Nandini		
2010	Lamhaa	Aziza Abbas Ansari		
2010	Aakrosh	Geeta		
2011	Dum Maaro Dum	Zoey Mendonza		
2012	Players	Riya Thapar		
2012	Jodi Breakers	Sonali Agnihotri		
2012	Raaz 3	Shanaya Shekhar		
2013	Race 2	Sonia Ranveer Singh	Cameo appearance	
2013	Aatma	Maya Verma		
2013	The Lovers	Tulaja Naik	Belgian film	
2014	Humshakals	Mishti		
2014	Creature 3D	Ahana Dutt		
2015	Alone	Sanjana and Anjana	Dual role	
2018	Welcome to New York	Herself	Cameo appearance	

== Television ==
Year	Title	Role	Notes	Ref.
2007	The New 7 Wonders of The World	Host		
2012–2014	CID	Herself	Episode: "Bhootiya Haveli" Episode: "Bipasha Par Hamla"	
2012	Fear Files	Herself	(season 1, episode 20)	
2013	Fit Test With Bipasha	Herself		
2013	Arjun	Maya	Episode 61	
2015–2016	Darr Sabko Lagta Hai	Host		
2016	Bhabiji Ghar Par Hai	Herself	Episode 2 (Shanivaar Special)	
2020	Dangerous	Neha Singh	Final Projects; Web series	

== Music video appearances ==
Year	Title	Album	Singer	Ref.
1998	"Tu"	Kismat	Sonu Nigam	
1999	"Sauda Khara"	Hai Energy	Sukhbir	
2000	"Tera Milna Pal Do Pal Ka"	Jaan	Sonu Nigam	
2004	"Stolen"	Me Against Myself	Jay Sean	
2005	"Mujhe Mere Yaar Se Matlab"	Mujhe Pyar Se Matlab	Rajiv Goswami	
2011	"Mind Blowing"	Let's Party	Ganesh Hedge	

=== Music song ===
- 2003: Appeared in Hum Ko To Hai Poora Yakeen made by MSN cricket and sports (MSN India) to support the Indian cricket team for the ICC Cricket World Cup 2003
