= GIFA =

GIFA may refer to:

- Global Indian Film Awards, awards ceremony
- Giesserei Internationale Fachmesse, four-yearly metal/foundry trade-show industry
