= Bachna Ae Haseeno (song) =

Song by R.D. Burman, Kishore Kumar, Sumit Kumar, Vishal Dadlani

from the album Hum Kisise Kum Naheen, Bachna Ae Haseeno
- Language: Hindi-Urdu
- Released: 1977, 2008
- Recorded: 1977, 2008
- Genre: Film soundtrack, Filmi, Disco, Dance pop
- Length: 6:24
- Label: T-Series, Saregama
- Songwriters: Majrooh Sultanpuri, Anvita Dutt Guptan
- Composers: R.D. Burman, Vishal–Shekhar
- Lyricists: Majrooh Sultanpuri, Anvita Dutt Guptan
- Producers: T-Series, R.D. Burman, Aditya Chopra, Yash Chopra

"Bachna Ae Hasseeno" is an Indian film song originally composed by R.D. Burman and written by Majrooh Sultanpuri from the film Hum Kisise Kum Naheen. The song was one of the biggest hits of 1977. It was so popular after some 30 years later Yash Chopra and his son Aditya Chopra decided to make a film on the name. The film was Bachna Ae Haseeno and became the eight highest-grossing film of the year. This song was later made on Rishi's son Ranbir Kapoor. The remix was changed from the original. The three heroines were included in the remix with some of the English lyrics. The remix was sung by three singers who included Kishore Kumar's voice also.

== First version and reception ==
The first version on Rishi Kapoor as a young and energetic man who sings the song in the front of the crowd. The song was sung by veteran singer Kishore Kumar. The song directed, produced by R.D. Burman for his album of the film. The song was the biggest hit of the time. The film was also third highest grossing of the year.

== Second version, reception and popular culture ==
=== Film ===
After nearly 30 years, Yash Chopra and Aditya Chopra made a film on the name of the song. It was the eight highest-grossing film of the year and was nominated for many awards. It was well praised by critics.

=== Remix version ===
The new song was pictured on Ranbir Kapoor who was the main actor of the film. He changed 10 wardrobes in the song. The song features English lyrics and Ranbir dancing with the ladies. One by one, the heroines, Deepika Padukone, Bipasha Basu and Minissha Lamba join him. Ranbir chases them and dances.

== Personnel ==
- Executive director and Producer-Aditya Chopra
- Writer-Anvita Dutt Guptan
- Music by-Vishal–Shekhar
- Lyrics-Jeet-Dev
- Designer-Aki Narula
- Singers-Vishal Dadlani, Sumit Kumar and Kishore Kumar
- Performers-Ranbir Kapoor, Deepika Padukone, Bipasha Basu and Minissha Lamba
