= Yeh Ladka Haye Allah =

Song by Asha Bhosle
- Released: 1977
- Recorded: Mumbai, 1977
- Genre: Film score, Filmi, Indian rock, Psychedelic rock, Raga rock
- Length: 5:30
- Label: Saregama India Ltd.
- Composer: R. D. Burman
- Lyricist: Majrooh Sultanpuri

"Yeh Ladka Haye Allah" (transl. This Boy Oh God!) is an Indian Hindi song from the 1977 Hindi film Hum Kisise Kum Naheen. It was sung by Asha Bhosle and Mohammad Rafi. The song was picturized on Rishi Kapoor and Kajal Kiran. It was written by Majrooh Sultanpuri and composed by R. D. Burman. It has been remixed and sampled by many other artists.

The song was a hit in the 1970s, and gained cult status in India. In 2020, Asha Bhosle named this song as one of her most favourite songs.

== Reviews ==
Indian newspaper The Print praised the score of Hum Kisise Kum Naheen. They praised the composition of all the songs, including "Yeh Ladka Haye Allah". Director Nasir Hussain has been credited as the mastermind of making such soulful songs.

== Cultural impact ==
In 2019, actress Madhuri Dixit sang this song in the dancing reality show Dance Deewane.

In 2021, the song was performed by Dheeraj Dhoopar and Shraddha Arya in the serial Kundali Bhagya.
