= Maxim (India) =

Indian edition of Maxim

- Deepika Padukone on the cover of Maxim 2017.
- Editor-in-Chief: Vivek Pareek
- Former editors: Anup Kutty; Sunil Mehra
- Staff writers: Saurav Bhanot; Shobhita Dutt
- Categories: Men's
- Frequency: Monthly
- Publisher: Xavier Collaco
- First issue: January 2006
- Final issue: 1 December 2018
- Company: Media Transasia India Ltd. Burda Media India
- Country: India
- Based in: Gurgaon
- Language: English
- Website: MaximIndia.in

Maxim was the Indian edition of the United Kingdom-based international monthly men's magazine called Maxim. It was known for its revealing pictorials featuring popular actresses, singers, and female models, none of which are nudes. The first issue of the Indian edition of Maxim was the January 2006 issue featuring Priyanka Chopra on the cover. The first issue was released on 28 December 2005. The magazine was the first international men's magazine to enter the Indian market and the 30th international version of Maxim. The magazine is no longer published in India.

Largely covering everything related to men's lifestyle, Maxim was the industry leader for men's magazines in India until 2018. Maxim stopped circulating its Indian edition publishing its last issue on 1 December 2018.

== Maxim Hot 100 ==
Each year since 2008, the Indian edition of Maxim releases the Maxim Hot 100. The winners and their corresponding ages and the year in which the magazine was released are listed below.

Year	Choice	Age	Notes
2008	Deepika Padukone	22	Youngest winner.
2009	Bipasha Basu	30	
2010	Sonam Kapoor	25	
2011	Priyanka Chopra	29	
2012	Kareena Kapoor	31	
2013	Priyanka Chopra	31	First woman to win twice.
2014	Katrina Kaif	31	
2015	Katrina Kaif	32	First woman to win consecutively.
2016	Priyanka Chopra	33	First woman to win for 3rd time.
2017	Deepika Padukone	31	Third woman to win twice.
2018	Priyanka Chopra	35	Oldest winner.

== Controversy ==
The magazine's inaugural issue in January 2006 featured a page called "Women you will never see in Maxim – 100% fake". Among the photos was a full-page morphed photograph showing Khushbu "posing" in black underwear, along with the caption "Of course, I am a virgin if you don't count from the behind." The caption was in reference to remarks made by Khushbu in 2005 whether or not modern men should expect their brides to be virgins. The actress described the photo, which showed only her head, as "immodest". Kushboo filed a petition with Chennai police commissioner R. Nataraj on 30 January 2006, citing two complaints: defamation and the indecent representation of women. The Supreme Court dismissed the case on 22 May 2006.

== Editors-in-Chief ==
The following have served as Editor-in-Chief of Maxim:

S. No.	Name	From	To
1	Sunil Mehra	January 2006	June 2006
2	Anup Kutty	July 2006	August 2009
3	Vivek Pareek	2009	2018
