= Hum Kisise Kum Naheen =

1977 Indian film by Nasir Hussain

- Film poster
- Directed by: Nasir Hussain
- Written by: Sachin Bhowmick; Nasir Hussain
- Produced by: Nasir Hussain
- Starring: Rishi Kapoor; Tariq Khan; Kaajal Kiran; Amjad Khan
- Cinematography: Munir Khan
- Edited by: Babu Lavande
- Music by: R.D. Burman
- Production company: Nasir Hussain Films
- Distributed by: Nasir Hussain Films; United Producers
- Release date: 25 August 1977
- Running time: 172 min
- Country: India
- Language: Hindi

Hum Kisise Kum Naheen (transl. We are not less than anyone) is a 1977 Indian masala film produced and directed by Nasir Hussain. It stars Rishi Kapoor, Tariq, Kaajal Kiran, and Amjad Khan, with Zeenat Aman in a special appearance. It took the third top spot at the box office in 1977. Mohammed Rafi received his only National Film Award for this film.

== Cast ==
- Rishi Kapoor as Rajesh (fake Manjeet Kumar Dana)
- Tariq Khan as Sanjay Kumar
- Kaajal Kiran as Kajal Kisharina
- Amjad Khan as Saudagar Singh
- Zeenat Aman as Sunita (special appearance)
- Ajit Khan as Sunita's father
- Om Shivpuri as Ram Kumar
- Kamal Kapoor as Kishorilal
- Ravinder Kapoor
- Rinku
- Vimal Ahuja as Baljit Kumar Dhana
- Ashoo
- Sushama Shiromanee
- Murad as Rajesh's father
- Tom Alter as Jack
- Master Bunty
- Baby Rani
- Agha as hotel manager (special appearance)

== Plot ==
The story begins with a wealthy man selling his entire estate in Africa, converting it to diamonds. He carries them in a belt and takes a flight to India. On the way, he suffers a fatal heart attack in the washroom, whilst in the throes of which, he requests a co-passenger to deliver the belt with diamonds to his son, Rajesh, who works in Ashoka Hotel, Delhi, as a singer-dancer-entertainer. The co-passenger happens to be a rich businessman named Kishorilal.

A few years ago when motherless Kajal's father Kishorilal was in a deep financial crisis, Sanjay's father gave shelter to him, who has now become extremely rich. The promise of getting Sanjay and Kajal married is forgotten when Kishorilal insults them and forgets the promise that was made years previously.

Almost immediately, Kishorilal is chased by goons who are after the diamonds. He escapes them temporarily and flies to Delhi, but finds them waiting for him as he exits the airport. Running from them, he enters a cycle shed (a parking place for bicycles), stashes the belt in the toolbox of a bicycle, and hides out of sight. The bicycle belongs to Sanjay Kumar, who is unaware that his bicycle has 25 crore rupees worth of diamonds hidden in its toolbox, and rides away with the bike before Kishorilal can see who he is. Saudagar Singh is actually the one on whose behalf those goons were after the diamonds. His plans having been thwarted as described above, Saudagar Singh and his partner Baljit Kumar Dana set a trap for Rajesh telling a false story to him about Kishorilal having kidnapped Saudagar Singh's son, Ramesh. Taken in by their story, Rajesh hatches a plot to spirit away Kishorilal's daughter, Kajal, by pretending to be in love with her, and, once he has her in her clutches, to thereby extorting the diamonds back from Kishorilal. Sanjay becomes Manjeet's manager and Sanjay also pretends to fall in love with Kajal, who is in love with her childhood love, Sanjay. They meet once before the scheme is discovered by Rajesh. There is a series of meetings between the Rajesh and Kajal. Saudagar uses Manjeet to get the diamonds himself in the climax, who brings them along with Kajal. However, she gets rescued by Rajesh and Sanjay, who escape with her. After a fight at the country border, in which all of Saudagar's daicots are defeated, Sanjay gets shot by Saudagar. After threatening Kajal, Sanjay, who is alive, shoots Saudagar dead before the police save them. Sanjay and Kajal become a couple, as do Rajesh and his ex, Sunita, who escaped from her own wedding to be with him.

== Soundtrack ==
Hum Kisise Kum Naheen

Soundtrack album by R. D. Burman
- Released: 1977
- Genre: Hindi Film Soundtrack
- Label: His Master's Voice
- Producer: R. D. Burman

The soundtrack, composed by R. D. Burman and lyrics written by Majrooh Sultanpuri, featured nine original songs, with vocals supplied by Kishore Kumar, Mohammed Rafi, Asha Bhosle, Sushma Shreshta, and the composer himself.

Popular songs include "Bachna Ae Haseeno", sung by Kumar and picturized on Kapoor, whose title inspired a film of the same name produced by Yash Raj Films in 2008, starring his son Ranbir Kapoor, and "Kya Hua Tera Vada", which won Rafi both the Filmfare Award and the National Film Award for the Best Male Playback Singer.

The leads perform a medley of songs in the competition, which include "Chand Mera Dil, Chandini Ho Tum", "Ae Dil Kya Mehfil Hai Tere Kadmon Mein", "Tum Kya Jaano Mohabbat Kya Hai", and "Mil Gaya Humko Saathi."

This film was released at a time when the Swedish pop group ABBA were at the peak of their popularity all over the world, including in India. One of their songs "Honey Honey" was featured in the movie, playing in the background just before the song "Kya Hua Tera Wada" begins. The song "Mil Gaya Humko Saathi" that is sung by Kajal during the competition is heavily inspired from the ABBA smash hit song "Mamma Mia."

| # | Song | Singer(s) | Raga |
|---|---|---|---|
| 1 | "Bachna Ae Haseenon Lo Main Aa Gaya" | Kishore Kumar | |
| 2 | "Aa Dil Kya Mehfil Hai Tere Kadmon Mein" | Kishore Kumar | |
| 3 | "Mil Gaya, Hum Ko Saathi Mil Gaya" | Kishore Kumar, Asha Bhosle | |
| 4 | "Humko To Yaara Teri Yaari, Jaan Se Pyaari" | Kishore Kumar, Asha Bhosle | |
| 5 | "Hai Agar Dushman Zamana, Gham Nahin" | Mohammed Rafi, Asha Bhosle | Kalavati |
| 6 | "Yeh Ladka Haay Allah Kaisa Hai Deewana" | Mohammed Rafi, Asha Bhosle | |
| 7 | "Kya Hua Tera Vaada, Woh Kasam, Woh Iraada" | Mohammed Rafi, Sushma Shrestha | |
| 8 | "Chand Mera Dil, Chandni Ho Tum" | Mohammed Rafi | |
| 9 | "Tum Kya Jaano Mohabbat Kya Hai" | R. D. Burman | |

== Awards ==
25th National Film Awards:

- Best Male Playback Singer – Mohammed Rafi for "Kya Hua Tera Vaada"

25th Filmfare Awards:
Won

- Best Male Playback Singer – Mohammed Rafi for "Kya Hua Tera Vaada"
- Best Cinematography – Munir Khan
- Best Art Direction – Shanti Dass

Nominated

- Best Supporting Actor – Tariq
- Best Music Director – R. D. Burman
- Best Lyricist – Majrooh Sultanpuri for "Kya Hua Tera Wada"
- Best Female Playback Singer – Sushma Shreshta for "Kya Hua Tera Wada"
