= Dum Maaro Dum (film) =

2011 Indian film by Rohan Sippy

- Theatrical release poster
- Directed by: Rohan Sippy
- Written by: Shridhar Raghavan
- Screenplay by
- Dialogues by: Shridhar Raghavan; Charudutt Acharya; Purva Naresh
- Produced by: Ramesh Sippy
- Starring: Abhishek Bachchan; Bipasha Basu; Rana Daggubati; Prateik Babbar; Aditya Pancholi
- Cinematography: Amit Roy
- Edited by: Aarif Sheikh
- Music by: Songs: Pritam; Score: MIdival Punditz; Karsh Kale
- Production companies: Ramesh Sippy Entertainment; Louverture Films; Cheyenne Enterprises
- Distributed by: Fox Star Studios
- Release date: 22 April 2011
- Running time: 130 minutes
- Countries: India; United States
- Language: Hindi
- Budget: ₹31 crore
- Box office: ₹51.1 crore

Dum Maaro Dum (transl. Take a Puff) is an Indian Hindi language 2011 action thriller film directed by Rohan Sippy and produced by Ramesh Sippy. The film stars Abhishek Bachchan and Bipasha Basu in the lead roles, with Rana Daggubati (in his Hindi film debut), Prateik Babbar, and Aditya Pancholi in supporting roles. Deepika Padukone makes a special appearance in the remix version of the song of the same title. The music was composed by Pritam. It became the first Indian film to have its soundtrack mixed in Dolby 7.1 Surround Sound.

Jump Games, an Indian mobile video game developer, also released a platformer based on the film.

== Plot ==
The film starts with a footballer, Lawrence "Lorry" Gomes, who gets admission into an American college. Due to insufficient funds, he is unable to fulfill his dream. On the other hand, his girlfriend Tani got a scholarship to the US. Though he is happy with his girlfriend's achievement, he becomes depressed for not fulfilling his own dream. His friend Ricky tells him that he can get him into the college, but Lorry will have to smuggle drugs along with him. Lorry agrees and, at the airport, successfully passes the X-ray machine.

ACP Vishnu Kamath is a previously corrupt cop who had accepted a lot of bribes to satisfy his family. However, his family died in a car accident. Several years later, he is offered a job by the Chief Minister of Goa: to flush out all the drug dealers in Goa, which he accepts. His success leads to a panic among the drug suppliers. The drug dealers gather for a meeting led by Zoey Mendosa. Zoey guarantees them that their drugs will be in safe hands if they are given to a mysterious person named Michael Barbosa. Kamath decides to chase Michael Barbosa and finds out about Ricky.

When Kamath reaches Ricky, he is already dead. Kamath finds out about his cocaine smuggling and his girlfriend, Rozanna. They reach the airport on the same day Lorry is about to leave. Kamath encounters Rozanna and finds a photo of Lorry in her phone. She is allowed to go due to a lack of evidence. Kamath then identifies Lorry as the person he had seen on Rozanna's phone. They detain him and find cocaine stuffed in his bag. Lorry is sent to juvenile jail, where his friend, DJ Joaquim "Joki" Fernandes, tries to get him out. It is then revealed that Zoey and Joki used to be in a relationship. Zoey wanted to be an air hostess but failed. Joki introduced her to his boss, Lorsa Biscuita, a.k.a. the Biscuit, who had worldwide contacts. With the help of his contacts, Biscuit got her a job in the airlines, though she had to smuggle cocaine to international regions to repay him. She ended up getting caught and was sentenced to 14 years in jail. Biscuit's contact got her free in 14 days, but to repay him, she had to sleep with Biscuit. She broke up with Joki and made her life drug-dealing with Biscuit.

Joki meets Zoey, and the two end up sleeping together. Zoey gives him a video of Biscuit announcing that he is going to have a rave in neighbouring Karnataka, out of Kamath's jurisdiction, and that Michael Barbosa will be bringing and exchanging drugs. Joki gives this tape to Kamath. When Biscuit learns about Zoey and Joki, he kills Zoey. After recruiting Lorry for help, Kamath attacks Biscuit's party and arrests the drug dealers. When Kamath's colleague Rane asks him about Barbosa, Kamath says that he knows the secret of Barbosa, and Rane kills Kamath. It is revealed that Rane was always involved with Biscuit. Joki later finds out about Kamath's death and arrives at the crime scene, fitting together the pieces as Kamath has. Michael Barbosa is not a man, but a gravesite Biscuit uses for storing drugs. We see Joki carefully storing the bags of cocaine somewhere, then calling Rane to arrange a meeting. Lorry is now free of the charge, and he leaves jail. When Joki and Rane are going to meet Biscuit, Joki kills Rane, saying that he knows Rane is the person who killed Kamath. Kamath's body is being cremated in an electric furnace owned by Biscuit. We see that this is where Joki has put the drugs, and Biscuit arrives only too late. Having been brought down by the destruction of his stockpile, Biscuit is killed by a woman, possibly Rozanna. Lorry comes to a beach party where Joki is singing, and Tani joins him in a joyful reunion. The film ends with Joki on his bike, riding off into the sunset, remembering Kamath and Zoey.

== Cast ==
- Abhishek Bachchan as ACP Vishnu Kamath
- Rana Daggubati as DJ Joaquim "Joki" Fernandes
- Bipasha Basu as Zoey Mendosa
- Aditya Pancholi as Lorsa Biscuita a.k.a. Biscuit
- Prateik Babbar as Lawrence "Lorry" Gomes
- Anaitha Nair as Tani, Lorry's girlfriend
- Govind Namdeo as ACP Sandesh Rane
- Mariah Gantois as Rozanna
- Vidya Balan as Mrs. Kamath (cameo appearance)
- Gulshan Devaiah as Ricky
- Deepika Padukone as an item number in the song "Dum Maaro Dum"

== Reception ==
=== Critical reception ===
The film received mixed-to-positive reviews.

The Times of India, which gave a three and a half rating, mentioned that "The film slags in places and needs tightening, but the lull is followed by a tangy twist in the tale, which makes up for the occasional yawn. Shridhar Raghavan writes a thrilling cops and robbers tale which has some quirky banter scripted by Purva Naresh. Add to this Goa captured in glowing colours by cinematographer Amit Roy and a peppy music score by Pritam, and director Rohan Sippy gives you a film that keeps the popcorn crackling, till the very end".

The Filmfare gave a four-star rating stating, "Dum Maaro Dum has a taut narrative that doesn't flail till post interval. It keeps you engrossed through an imaginative blend of some stupendous background music, animated cinematography and simple effective storytelling. The characters are introduced with clarity and soon you get a very clear picture of what's going with whom. As for the performances Abhishek does an earnest and impressive job. Rana Daggubati sure has an impressive screen presence but we must wait to find out if that dead pan expression is restricted only to this film. Pratik looks dazed and you don't want to take your eyes off him when he is on screen. Bipasha looks suitably traumatised".

Anupama Chopra of NDTV gave a two and a half star rating saying, "Dum Maaro Dum has all the ingredients of crackling entertainment. This is one film that should soar, but sadly it never quite takes flight. The problem is the writing. has some punchy dialogue-baazi and snazzy action, especially a nicely done shoot-out at a night market. It also features Abhishek's best performance in recent times. But the narrative slumps in places, the plot has loopholes and the characters just aren't convincing enough to grab you.

Taran Adarsh of Bollywood Hungama rated the film two and a half and noted, "Film is like fast food that's high on calories, but falls short in the nutrition department. Yes, it's slick, stylish and well-crafted, but the fact remains that it lacks the power [in its second hour specifically] to create a dum-daar impression. however, he praised the lead performances. Abhishek is super in the role of a tough cop whose life undergoes a U-turn when personal tragedy strikes. Much of the joy comes from watching Rana Daggubati infuse believability into his character. He's easy on the eyes and is a complete natural when it comes to acting. Bipasha shines in several moments of the film.

Daily News & Analysis gave a three-star rating saying, "With the body of a modern thriller and the soul of a 1970s masala film, the idea behind the hybridization had potential, but 'Dum Maaro Dum' falls slightly short ". Nevertheless, it still recommended the film.

Hindustan Times reviewer Mayank Shankar gave it a three-star rating and noted "It just about makes for an enticing thriller here. There's probably an even better film when compressed."

India Today reviewer Kaveree Bamzai gave a three and a half rating said that the movie is "With some cutting edge background music and a haunting song by Papon which remains in your head, Dum Maaro Dum is a stylish thriller written as smartly as it is directed".

Rajeev Masand of CNN IBN gave it a two-star rating explaining, " It's watchable, but it could easily have been so much more. The action sequences add style to the story, with more than one smartly-filmed chase scene. The dialogues too pack quite a punch, before it all starts to feel too much. In the end, it's Abhishek Bachchan who throws you with his sheer presence. He plays Kamath with just the right amount of steely nerve and naked emotions. Unfortunately, it isn't enough to lift this film from an average drugs-drama to a smart and entertaining action thriller. It's got its moments, but they're few and far between".

Gaurav Malani of Indiatimes gave it a positive review, saying, "In the bigger picture, the story of Dum Maaro Dum isn't something one hasn't witnessed before. A corrupt cop turns honest on losing his family. He is summoned to purify a polluted province. A white-collared kingpin operates at large in the region. An innocent chap is engulfed in the nexus. The cop has to liberate the innocent and convict the guilty. Doesn't this sound like a standard scheme of an 80s potboiler? But what makes Rohan Sippy's film entertaining is its smart storytelling, sincere setting and slick treatment." He also praised Abhishek's performance, saying that his childhood friend Rohan Sippy clearly knows how to best use the actor.

Tushar Joshi of Mid-Day gave it three stars out of five. He criticized the film for its length and was unimpressed by Bipasha's performance, saying that she was lacklustre. But he added that for all its drawbacks, the film is nevertheless worth a watch because of its gripping storyline and stylish treatment of the same.

Deepauk Murugesan of New Indian Express praised the film, commenting, "At its core, Rohan Sippy's film is about two love stories coming together to salvage the future of a third. It is a uniquely male fantasy and grossly idealistic, but its excess is well cloaked in the blood-soaked grittiness that permeates the film."

=== Box office ===
Dum Maaro Dum managed a decent opening weekend of ₹ 165 million in India and ₹ 63 million in the overseas market. After four weeks, the film grossed ₹ 318.4 million in India. In India Dum Maaro Dum has managed to gross 326 million (appx). It has released across 1200 screen. Reportedly, the film has fared well in the southern territories like Andhra Pradesh, Nizam, Mysore and Karnataka. At the International Box Office, Dum Maaro Dum collected $1.4 million approximately. In US the film earned $360,000, UK – $157,000, Mid-East – $300,000 and Australia – NZ – $150,000. The film was declared "sleeper hit" by Box Office India.

According to Vijay Singh, the CEO of Fox Star Studios, the film "recovered its cost of production of Rs 310 million in the first weekend from theatrical (domestic and International), music (including overflows) and satellite, thus ensuring it to be a profitable venture." The film grossed ₹511 million (US$5.3 million) worldwide.

== Controversy ==
There was controversy over the theme of the film. One particular promotional dialogue from the film, "Liquor is cheap here and women are even cheaper here", caused quite a stir. Journalist Savio Rodrigues filed a petition to Goa Bench of Bombay High Court seeking a permanent ban on the movie stating that the wrong portrayal might attract sex offenders, drug launderers and criminals to Goa.

== Soundtrack ==
Director Rohan Sippy launched the song Dum Maaro Dum during the 2011 India – South Africa ICC Cricket World Cup match on 12 March 2011. The music of the film was composed by Pritam.

== Awards and nominations ==
Award	Category	Recipients and nominees	Result
Stardust Awards	Best Actress in a Thriller or Action	Bipasha Basu	Won
Zee Cine Awards	Best Male Debut	Rana Daggubati	Won
Global Film Awards	Best Actress	Bipasha Basu	Nominated
Dainik Bhasker Bollywood Web Awards	Superstar of the Year	Bipasha Basu	Nominated
