= Bachna Ae Haseeno =

2008 Indian film by Siddharth Anand

- Theatrical release poster
- Directed by: Siddharth Anand
- Written by: Screenplay: Devika Bhagat; Dialogues: Anvita Dutt Guptan
- Story by: Aditya Chopra
- Produced by: Aditya Chopra
- Starring: Ranbir Kapoor; Bipasha Basu; Deepika Padukone; Minissha Lamba
- Narrated by: Ranbir Kapoor
- Cinematography: Sunil Patel
- Edited by: Ritesh Soni
- Music by: Songs: R. D. Burman; Vishal–Shekhar; Background Score: Salim–Sulaiman
- Production company: Yash Raj Films
- Distributed by: Yash Raj Films
- Release date: 15 August 2008
- Running time: 152 minutes
- Country: India
- Language: Hindi
- Budget: ₹23 crore
- Box office: ₹61.57 crore

Bachna Ae Haseeno (transl. Watch Out, Beauties) is a 2008 Indian Hindi-language romantic comedy film directed by Siddharth Anand. Produced by Yash Raj Films, the film stars Ranbir Kapoor, Bipasha Basu, Deepika Padukone, and Minissha Lamba in lead roles. The title of the film was taken from the popular song "Bachna Ae Haseeno" from Hum Kisise Kum Naheen (1977), which starred Kapoor's father, Rishi Kapoor.

Bachna Ae Haseeno was released on 15 August 2008, on the 61st Indian Independence Day, and grossed ₹61.57 crore worldwide, becoming the eighth-highest grossing Hindi film of 2008. It received mixed-to-positive reviews from critics upon release.

At the 54th Filmfare Awards, Bachna Ae Haseeno received 3 nominations – Best Supporting Actress (Basu), Best Male Playback Singer (KK for "Khuda Jaane") and Best Female Playback Singer (Shilpa Rao for "Khuda Jaane").

== Plot ==
Raj Sharma is a young playboy who meets three young women at different stages in his life and learns important lessons about love along the way. As the story opens in 2008, it leads to a series of flashbacks describing his growth both emotionally and ethically.

=== 1996, Switzerland – Mahi ===
Raj goes on a trip to Switzerland with his friends after his 12th standard exams. He runs into Mahi Pasricha on the Eurail, who is on vacation with her friends and family. Mahi is a sweet, dreamy girl who believes in true love and is hoping to find her 'Raj' (the protagonist of the 1995 romantic movie Dilwale Dulhania Le Jayenge) i.e. her true love. When she misses her train, Raj helps her reach the airport through a different route. On the way, they share a kiss after Raj reads her a poem he wrote about her. She then falls in love with him. At the airport, when she opens the paper on which Raj had written the poem, she finds it blank. Raj boasts to his friends about what happened between the pair and how he took full advantage of the situation when she was alone. Mahi overhears this and is shocked and heartbroken. Raj realizes that she has overheard his conversation with his friends and shamefacedly leaves.

=== 2002, Mumbai – Radhika ===
Six years after the Switzerland episode, Raj has moved to Mumbai and found a job with Microsoft as a game designer with his best friend Sachin Kashyap. Pretty soon, he enters into a live-in relationship with neighbor Radhika Kapoor, an aspiring model from Ranchi. Having received an offer to move to Sydney for a game launch, he expects to be able to leave Radhika and move on, assuming she is capable of handling a break-up. This vision is shattered when Radhika declares that she intends to sacrifice her career to marry Raj and join him in Australia. Raj frantically makes up reasons to prevent them from getting married, but Radhika remains firm. Unable to express his commitment phobia, Raj, along with Sachin, boards his flight to Sydney on the morning of his wedding. Radhika learns this while waiting for Raj at the registrar's office dressed as a bride and is left heartbroken in the rain.

=== 2007, Sydney – Gayatri ===
5 years down the line, Raj now enjoys a successful career along with Sachin in Sydney. He meets Gayatri Divecha, a feisty and an independent woman who studies at a business school during the day, works in a supermarket and moonlights as a taxi-driver at night. As they date, he gains feelings for her. He also realizes that his feelings for her challenge his misgivings towards commitment. He proposes to her, but Gayatri turns him down, saying that she is happy with her life as she is and she doesn't believe in marriage and commitment as she believes that she doesn't need anyone to fulfill her needs and demands.

Rejection cuts Raj deep. He recalls when he broke the hearts of Mahi and Radhika, realizing how they must have felt. He decides to seek them out and ask for forgiveness.

=== 2008 – Present Day ===
On his return to India, in Amritsar, in 2008, Raj first seeks out Mahi, who is now married and has two sons. Her husband Joginder "Jogi" Singh Ahluwalia recognizes Raj from the Switzerland episode and knocks him out. He blames Raj for Mahi no longer believing in love or romance because of him, although he explains that she is a perfect wife and has a perfect home and family. Firm in his decision not to leave without being forgiven, he befriends Jogi's friend Karan Bahl, who is set to be married. At Karan's sangeet ceremony, Raj apologizes to Mahi and convinces her that Jogi is her true love, while also reconciling with the Pasrichas in the process. She opens up to Jogi and forgives Raj.

Raj then searches for Radhika and discovers that she has rechristened herself to Shreya Rathore and has become a successful supermodel. Raj tries to meet Shreya at an event but she ignores him. Shreya then flies to Capri for a vacation and Raj follows her there. Raj finally meets Shreya but she refuses to accept his apologies and tells him that if he really wants her forgiveness, he will have to work for it. Willing to do this, Raj becomes her personal assistant and she makes him do all sorts of tasks, even serving at parties. She humiliates him on every occasion, but he remains firm, serving without complaints. She finally gives up and tells him how hurt she had felt back then, and asks him to leave. However, before Raj goes home, she arrives and tells him that she realized that the root of her frustration was bottled-up hate against him that she no longer bears. She then forgives him as he leaves.

Content, Raj returns to Australia. On his return, he finds a pile of letters from Gayatri, written over the six months he was gone. Raj meets Gayatri in her taxi. She regrets turning him down. The lovers reconcile and confess their love.

== Cast ==
- Ranbir Kapoor as Raj Sharma
- Bipasha Basu as Radhika Kapoor / Shreya Rathore
- Deepika Padukone as Gayatri Divecha
- Minissha Lamba as Mahi Ahluwalia (née Pasricha)
- Kunal Kapoor as Joginder "Jogi" Singh Ahluwalia, Mahi's husband
- Hiten Paintal as Sachin Kashyap, Raj's best friend
- Sumeet Arora as Manish Ahuja, Raj's friend
- Puneet Issar as Rohit Pasricha, Mahi's father
- Avantika Hundal as Mona Joshi, Mahi's friend
- Sham Mashalkar as Vishal Bhardwaj, Raj's friend
- Natasha Bhardwaj as Preeti Malhotra, Mahi's best friend
- Pratik Dixit as Karan Bahl, Jogi's friend

== Production ==
In April 2007, several sources indicated that director Siddharth Anand had cast Ranbir Kapoor as the lead for his next film. However, he dismissed the rumors and called it "mere speculation" and "absolutely untrue," Anand later confirmed that Kapoor was indeed starring in his film. Anand was in talks with Preity Zinta, Bipasha Basu and Deepika Padukone for the female leads, but specified that "it wouldn't be right to reveal their names until we they were signed on the dotted line." In June 2007, Katrina Kaif and Padukone were cast to play two of the female leads. Kaif's character was later removed from the script due to the screenplay becoming too long. Amrita Rao was offered to play one of the female leads, but declined.

The heroines in the film share limited screentime, and therefore a large portion of their roles were filmed separately. Basu's portions were filmed in Mumbai, India and Capri, Italy. Padukone's portions were filmed in Sydney, while the song "Khuda Jaane" was shot at multiple locations in Italy, including Venice, Alberobello, Santa Cesarea Terme, Mattinata, Apulia, Naples, and Capri. Lamba's portions, inspired by Aditya Chopra's Dilwale Dulhania Le Jayenge, were filmed in similar locations in Amritsar and Switzerland.

Kapoor's look in the film was styled by Aki Narula, which changed with time. In the title track, Kapoor had at least 10 wardrobe changes in a single shot. Though he found styling for 3 lead actresses' characters exciting and challenging, as all play different people who enter into Kapoor's life at different times, so he ensured that the styling was unique without any overlapping.

Since two of the film's characters work for Microsoft Game Studios, plenty of video games released by them are referenced. In addition, nearly all of the films referenced are Yash Raj Films' productions, with the notable exception of Hum Kisise Kum Naheen (1977).

== Release ==
Continuing the tradition of showcasing the first look of their upcoming films with their latest release, Yash Raj Films showcased the first teaser-trailer of the film on 25 April 2008 with the release of Vijay Krishna Acharya's Tashan, while the official trailer of the film was released on 27 June 2008 with the release of Kunal Kohli's Thoda Pyaar Thoda Magic.

Yash Raj Films usually does not spend much money on promotion. However, it made an exception with Bachna Ae Haseeno. Instead of the usual promotion 2–3 weeks before a film release, the production house planned a new strategy with promotional activities taking place over a span of 2 months.

== Soundtrack ==
Bachna Ae Haseeno

Soundtrack album by R. D. Burman & Vishal–Shekhar
- Released: 5 July 2008
- Genre: Film soundtrack
- Length: 32:42
- Label: YRF Music
- Producers: Aditya Chopra & Yash Chopra

R. D. Burman & Vishal–Shekhar chronology
De Taali (2008)	Bachna Ae Haseeno (2008)	Dostana (2008)

The film's soundtrack was composed by Vishal–Shekhar, with lyrics written by Anvita Dutt. The song "Bachna Ae Haseeno" was a recreation of the song "Bachna Ae Haseeno" composed by R. D. Burman for the 1977 film Hum Kisise Kum Naheen. There are seven tracks in the film including a remix version. The album entered the Top 3 of the music charts within a couple of days of its arrival on the stands. According to the Indian trade website Box Office India, with around 1,600,000 units sold, this film's soundtrack album was the year's sixth highest-selling, with the songs "Khuda Jaane" and "Bachna Ae Haseeno" being popular among the masses. While the title track “Bachna Ae Haseeno” is used in the film, the song is not in the album due to copyright issues.

Track listing
No.	Title	Singer(s)	Length
1.	"Khuda Jaane"	KK, Shilpa Rao	5:33
2.	"Lucky Boy"	Sunidhi Chauhan, Hard Kaur, Raja Hasan	4:14
3.	"Aashista Aashista"	Lucky Ali, Shreya Ghoshal	5:50
4.	"Jogi Mahi"	Sukhwinder Singh, Shekhar Ravjiani, Himani Kapoor	4:53
5.	"Small Town Girl"	Shankar Mahadevan	3:48
6.	"Khuda Jaane (Revisited)" (Remix by Abhijit Nalani)	KK, Shilpa Rao	4:43
7.	"Bachna Ae Haseeno Title Track (Not included in album)"	Kishore Kumar, Sumeet Kumar, Vishal Dadlani	3:31

== Awards and nominations ==
Award	Category	Recipient(s) and nominee(s)	Result
54th Filmfare Awards	Best Supporting Actress	Bipasha Basu	Nominated
54th Filmfare Awards	Best Male Playback Singer	KK for "Khuda Jaane"	Nominated
54th Filmfare Awards	Best Female Playback Singer	Shilpa Rao for "Khuda Jaane"	Nominated
10th IIFA Awards	Best Supporting Actress	Bipasha Basu	Nominated
10th IIFA Awards	Best Lyricist	Anvita Dutt Guptan for "Khuda Jaane"	Nominated
10th IIFA Awards	Best Male Playback Singer	KK for "Khuda Jaane"	Nominated
10th IIFA Awards	Best Female Playback Singer	Shilpa Rao for "Khuda Jaane"	Nominated
2009 Stardust Awards	Star of the Year – Male	Ranbir Kapoor	Nominated
2009 Stardust Awards	Best Supporting Actress	Bipasha Basu	Nominated
15th Screen Awards	Best Actor	Ranbir Kapoor	Nominated
15th Screen Awards	Best Lyricist	Anvita Dutt Guptan for "Khuda Jaane"	Won
15th Screen Awards	Best Male Playback Singer	KK for "Khuda Jaane"	Won
15th Screen Awards	Best Female Playback Singer	Shilpa Rao for "Khuda Jaane"	Won
