= No Entry =

2005 Indian film by Anees Bazmee

- Theatrical release poster
- Directed by: Anees Bazmee
- Written by: Anees Bazmee
- Based on: Charlie Chaplin by Sakthi Chidambaram
- Produced by: Boney Kapoor
- Starring: Anil Kapoor; Salman Khan; Fardeen Khan; Bipasha Basu; Esha Deol; Lara Dutta; Celina Jaitley
- Cinematography: Ashok Mehta; Arvind Soni
- Edited by: Sanjay Sankla
- Music by: Soundtrack: Anu Malik; Background Score: Salim–Sulaiman
- Production companies: Sahara One Motion Pictures; BSK Network & Entertainment; S.K. Film Enterprises
- Distributed by: Sahara Motion Pictures (India); Eros International (Overseas)
- Release date: 26 August 2005
- Running time: 161 minutes
- Country: India
- Language: Hindi
- Budget: ₹20 crore
- Box office: ₹74 crore

No Entry is a 2005 Indian Hindi-language comedy film written and directed by Anees Bazmee and produced by Boney Kapoor. The film stars Anil Kapoor, Salman Khan, Fardeen Khan, Bipasha Basu, Esha Deol, Lara Dutta, Celina Jaitly. It is an official remake of the Tamil film Charlie Chaplin (2002).

No Entry was released theatrically on 26 August 2005 with a budget of ₹20 crore, and attained blockbuster success, grossing a worldwide total of ₹74 crore, thus becoming the highest-grossing Indian film of 2005.

Bazmee later scripted and wrote a 2011 romantic comedy produced by Ronnie Screwvala and Twinkle Khanna which was based on a similar theme; titled Thank You, it starred Khanna's husband, actor Akshay Kumar, Anil Kapoor's daughter Sonam and Jaitley among the ensemble cast.

== Plot ==
Kishan, a wealthy print media owner, is married to the suspicious-minded Kajal, who thinks he is having an affair with another woman, though he is faithful to her and never wants to betray her anyway. His friend Prem, a rich businessman, has the opposite situation and has many affairs with other girls, even though he is married to Pooja, who is very trusting. Kishan's employee, Shekhar a.k.a. Sunny, accidentally falls in love with Sanjana, who hates lies and doesn't tolerate other women in a man's life.

As Kishan takes Prem's photos with his girlfriend and threatens to inform Pooja, Prem sends Bobby, a call girl, to seduce Kishan. The plan is that he'll fall into Prem's trap. Kishan plans to meet Bobby at his home while Kajal travels to Ajmer. As her passport is left at home, she returns and finds Bobby with Kishan in their outhouse, which they'd given Sunny to live in. Kishan tells Kajal that Bobby is Sunny's wife; Sanjana, set to marry Sunny, thinks Bobby is Kishan's wife.

Prem, in order to save his friends' marriages, tells Sanjana and Kajal that Bobby was his first wife. It becomes a bundle of confusion, arguments, and comedy when all the various couples meet together. The truth is eventually told through many comedic encounters, and eventually, Kishan, Prem, and Sunny seemingly turn over a new leaf. It is hinted at the film's end, however, that the three friends haven't fully turned over a new leaf with the entrance of an unknown woman.

== Cast ==
- Anil Kapoor as Kishan Singhania
- Salman Khan as Prem Khanna
- Fardeen Khan as Shekhar "Sunny" Saxena
- Bipasha Basu as Bobby Saluja
- Esha Deol as Pooja Khanna
- Lara Dutta as Kajal Singhania
- Celina Jaitly as Sanjana Saxena
- Boman Irani as Param Kumar "P. K." Gupta
- Neetha Shetty as Preeti Koppikar
- Paresh Ganatra as Jagmohan Saluja
- Dinesh Hingoo as Dr. Dilip Jaisingh, Hotel employee
- Pratima Kazmi as Dhamini Gupta
- Razak Khan as Johnny Toteywala
- Anjan Srivastav as Judge Mrityunjay Saxena
- Sameera Reddy as a beach girl (cameo appearance)

== Production ==
=== Development ===
During the production of No Entry, speculations arose that it would be a remake of the film Masti (2004). The comparisons were made due to both films revolving around the same subject of extra-marital affairs. However, producer Boney Kapoor strongly denied the similarities and clarified that No Entry would be a remake of the Tamil movie titled Charlie Chaplin (2002). Kapoor also stressed that he would never endorse innuendo-based films such as Masti.

== Soundtrack ==
No Entry

Soundtrack album by Anu Malik
- Released: June 2005
- Genre: Feature film soundtrack
- Label: Tips Music

The music of the film was composed by Anu Malik. Lyrics were written by Sameer.

Vocals are supplied by Alisha Chinoy, Kumar Sanu (for Kapoor), Sonu Nigam (for Salman Khan), KK (for Fardeen Khan), Udit Narayan, Alka Yagnik, Sunidhi Chauhan and Vasundhara Das.

As of 2024, "Kahan Ho Tum" is the last song sung by Narayan and Sanu together.

=== Track listing ===
No.	Title	Singer(s)	Length
1.	"No Entry / Ishq Ki Galli Vich"	Sonu Nigam, Alisha Chinoy	6:08
2.	"Just Love Me / Main Akela"	Sonu Nigam	4:41
3.	"Ishq Mein"	KK, Alisha Chinoy	5:36
4.	"Why Why / Dil Chura Ke"	Alisha Chinoy	5:24
5.	"Hot Hot / Kalyug Ki Laila"	Sunidhi Chauhan, Alisha Chinoy, Vasundhara Das	5:55
6.	"Kahan Ho Tum"	Kumar Sanu, Udit Narayan	5:43
7.	"Dil Paagal Hai"	Kumar Sanu, Alka Yagnik, KK	4:51
8.	"Mera Jaisa Koi Nahin"	Alisha Chinoy, Sunidhi Chauhan	5:10

== Reception ==
=== Box office ===
It was a box office success, grossing ₹74.13 crore worldwide. The film topped the Chennai box office on its opening weekend.

=== Critical response ===
Taran Adarsh of Bollywood Hungama gave the film 3.5 stars out of 5, and stated "No Entry is a joyride that is bound to click with the masses in a big way. At the box-office, No Entry has all it takes to prove a success story on account of its massive star cast and excellent comedy it has to offer. Go have fun!" India Today stated, "The movie is mostly about suspicious, nagging wives, extramarital affairs and lots of semi-clad, sexy bodies cavorting in foreign locations." Patsy N of Rediff.com stated, "If we can watch men sleeping around, and laugh about them, why can't we do the same with movies about woman having extramarital affairs?" Vinayak Chakraborty of Hindustan Times wrote that the movie "works as thoroughly unapologetic, paisa vasool slapstick — the popular formula that Bollywood’s new-age makers of ‘comedies’ have hit upon, post David Dhawan," and that it rides on the "raw star power of Salman Khan."

Jaspreet Pandohar of BBC gave the film 2 out of 5 stars and stated "After tackling a romance and thriller, writer/director Anees Bazmee tries his hand at comedy with No Entry, a caper jammed-packed with Bollywood stars. Great gags sadly deteriorate into a series of stinky slapstick scenes you'll wish had never entered your life." Marc Savlov of Austin Chronicle gave the film 3.5 out of 5 stars, and stated "Writer-turned-director Bazmee has crafted a relatively smart and snarky war of the sexes minus the sex but with plenty of juicily hammy performances and enough outrageous one-liners, sight gags, and mistaken-identity yuks."

== Accolades ==
Awards	Category	Nominees	Results
Filmfare Awards	Best Film	Boney Kapoor	Nominated
Filmfare Awards	Best Supporting Actress	Bipasha Basu	Nominated
Filmfare Awards	Best Comedian	Anil Kapoor	Nominated
Filmfare Awards	Best Comedian	Salman Khan	Nominated
International Indian Film Academy Awards	Best Film	Boney Kapoor, Surinder Kapoor, S.K. Films Enterprises, Sahara One Motion Pictures	Nominated
International Indian Film Academy Awards	Best Supporting Actress	Lara Dutta	Nominated
Producers Guild Film Awards	Best Actor	Anil Kapoor	Nominated
Zee Cine Awards	Best Actor in a Supporting Role – Male	Fardeen Khan	Nominated

== See also ==
- List of highest-grossing Bollywood films
