= Bipasha Basu =

Indian actress (born 1979)

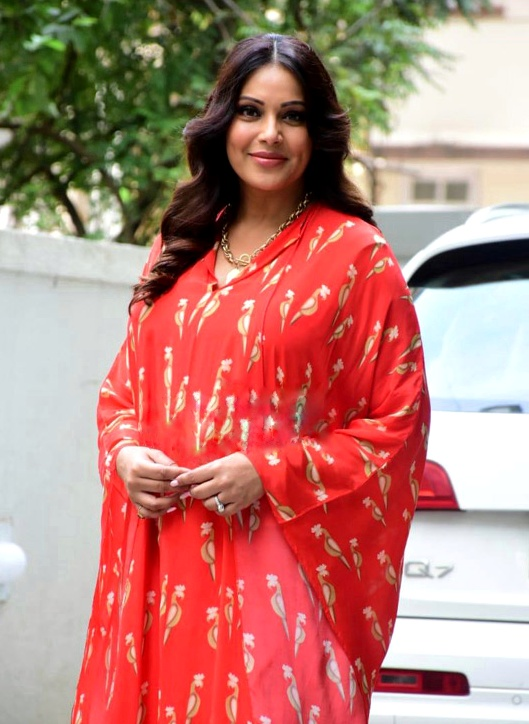
- Basu in 2022
- Born: 7 January 1979 (age 47); New Delhi, India
- Occupation: Actress
- Years active: 1996–2020 and 2026-present
- Works: Full list
- Spouse: Karan Singh Grover (m. 2016)
- Children: 1
- Awards: Full list

Bipasha Basu (Bengali pronunciation: [bipaʃa boʃu]; born 7 January 1979) is an Indian actress. Primarily known for her work in Hindi films, she has received a Filmfare Award. One of the leading actresses of the 2000s and early 2010s, she is known for her work in the thriller and horror genres. Basu is frequently cited in the media as a sex symbol and a scream queen.

Born in Delhi and raised in Kolkata, Basu pursued a successful career as a fashion model. She then began receiving offers for film roles and made her acting debut with the thriller Ajnabee (2001), which won her the Filmfare Award for Best Female Debut. Basu's first leading role was in the horror film Raaz(2002), for which she earned a nomination for the Filmfare Award for Best Actress. Her career progressed with a leading role in the erotic thriller Jism (2003) and in two consecutive annual top-grossing films, No Entry (2005) and Dhoom 2 (2006).

Basu's other commercially successful films include the drama Corporate (2006), the comedies Phir Hera Pheri (2006) and All the Best: Fun Begins (2009), the thriller Race (2008), and the romantic comedy Bachna Ae Haseeno (2008). In the 2010s, she starred in the horror films Raaz 3D (2012), Aatma (2013), Creature 3D (2014) and Alone (2015). This was followed by a hiatus during which her sole appearance was in the thriller series Dangerous (2020).

In addition to acting in films, Basu is a fitness enthusiast who has featured in several fitness videos. She hosted the horror series Darr Sabko Lagta Hai in 2015. Following high-profile relationship with actor and model Dino Morea and John Abraham, Basu married actor Karan Singh Grover in 2016, with whom she has one daughter. With a networth of 150 Crore INR(US$16 million), she is one of the richest female celebrities in India.

== Early life and education ==
Bipasha Basu was born on 7 January 1979 to a Bengali family. Her father, Hirak, is a civil engineer, and her mother, Mamta, is a homemaker. She has one elder sister, Bidisha, and one younger sister, Vijayeta. According to Basu, her name means "deep, dark, desire".

In Delhi, Basu lived at Pamposh Enclave, Nehru Place until age eight and studied at Apeejay High School. Her family then moved to Kolkata, where she attended Bhavan's Gangabux Kanoria Vidyamandir in Bidhannagar. In her school, Basu was appointed as the head girl and was fondly called 'Lady Goonda' due to her short and commanding personality.

== Modelling career ==
In 1996, Basu was spotted at a hotel in Kolkata by the model Mehr Jesia Rampal, who suggested she take up modelling. That year, she participated in and eventually won the Godrej Cinthol Supermodel Contest (organised by Ford), thereby representing India at Ford Models Supermodel of the World contest in Miami. Actor Vinod Khanna, who was one of the judges in the contest, wanted to cast her alongside his son Akshaye Khanna in the romance Himalay Putra (1997). Basu felt she was too young and declined the role, which eventually went to Anjala Zaveri. She later appeared in a Calida commercial with her then-boyfriend Dino Morea, which was controversial for picturing them in a sultry context; she had protesters outside her house as a result.

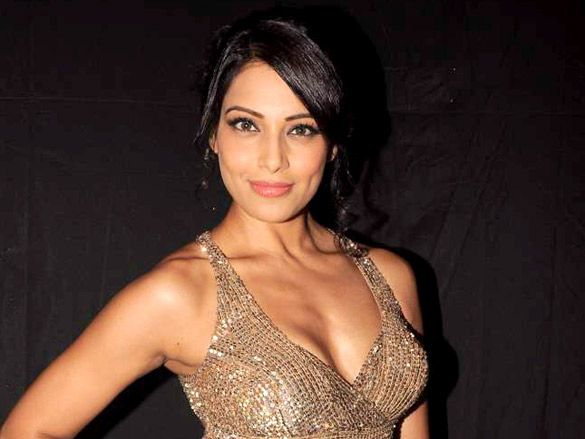
Basu at the Lakmé Fashion Week in 2012

With appearances on several magazine covers, Basu continued to pursue a career in fashion modeling during her late teens. At some point, Basu was approached to star opposite Abhishek Bachchan in J. P. Dutta's Aakhari Mughal, which was supposed to be Bachchan's launch film. However, the film was cancelled, and Dutta instead made the romantic drama Refugee with Kareena Kapoor. Basu was offered a role opposite Sunil Shetty in Refugee, which she declined.

In 1999, Basu featured in an advertisement with Vivek Oberoi, that was banned from broadcast on Indian television due to scenes that were considered 'bold' at the time, but the ad found its way on social media several years later.

Following her transition into acting, Basu continued to appear occasionally in fashion shows and modeling assignments. In 2013, she walked the ramp at the Lakmé Fashion Week Summer-Resort for designers Shantanu & Nikhil. Reflecting on the experience, Basu remarked that returning to the runway reminded her of her early modeling days and noted that "modeling is a tough life."

== Acting career ==
=== Debut, breakthrough and rise to prominence (2001–2005) ===
Basu finally made her acting debut in a negative role opposite Akshay Kumar in Abbas–Mustan's action thriller Ajnabee (2001) which also starred Kapoor and Bobby Deol. The film was inspired by the American film Consenting Adults (1992). Ajnabee received mixed reviews from critics upon release, with particular praise for Basu's performance, and it emerged as a moderate commercial success at the box-office. Her performance in the film also earned her the Filmfare Award for Best Female Debut.

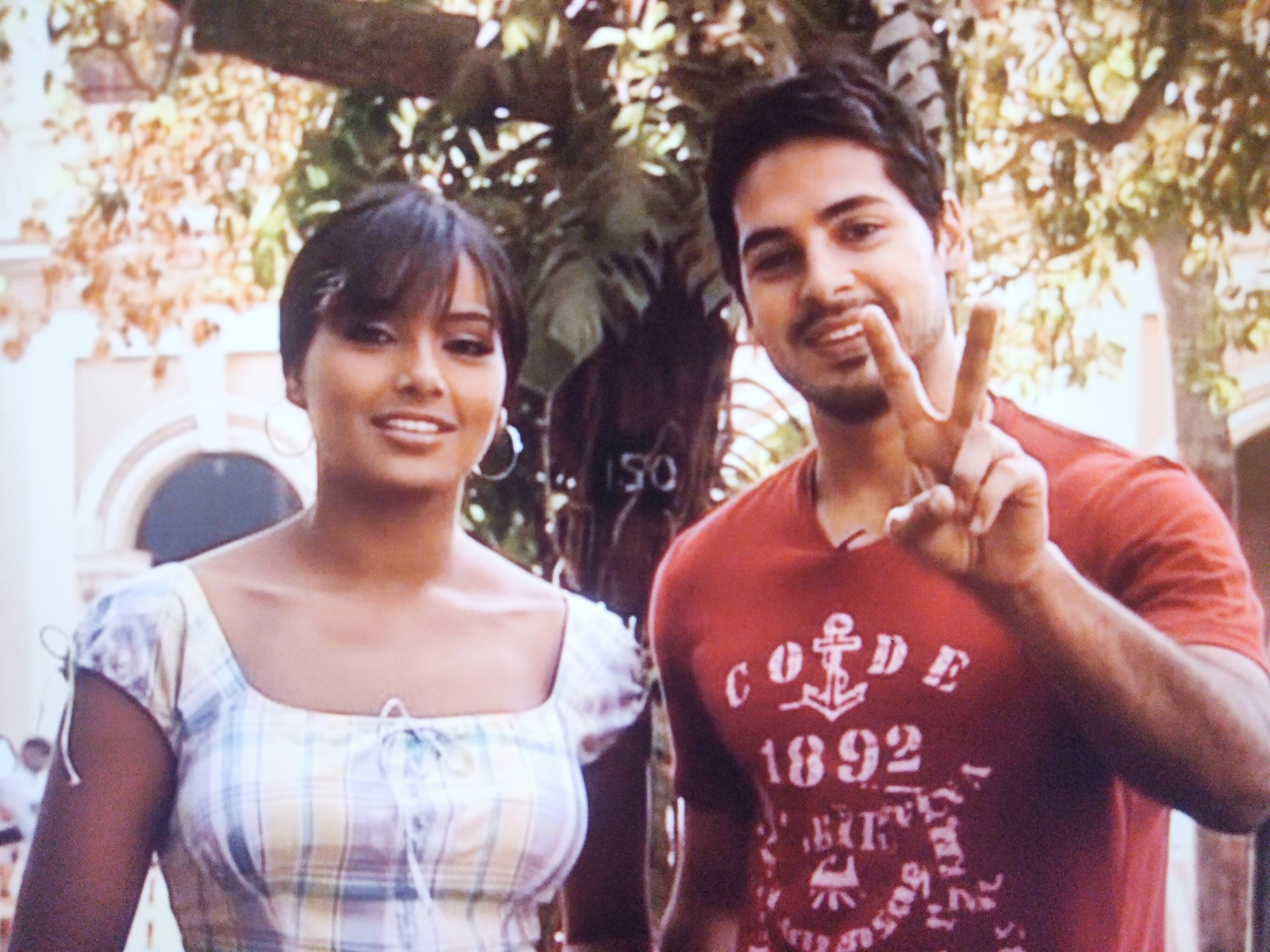
Basu with her Raaz co-star and then partner Dino Morea in 2002

Basu achieved her breakthrough with Vikram Bhatt's supernatural horror thriller Raaz (2002), which was the first instalment of the Raaz film series. Based on the Hollywood film What Lies Beneath (2000), it also starred Dino Morea and debutante Malini Sharma. Portraying a woman in a failing marriage who discovers that her husband is part of a ghostly conspiracy haunting their new home, the film earned Basu widespread critical acclaim and established her in the Hindi film industry. One review in The Tribune noted, "...it is Basu who steals the show with her impactful performance." The film also emerged as a major commercial success at the box office, ranking as the third highest-grossing Hindi film of the year. Raaz earned Basu her first nomination for the Filmfare Award for Best Actress. She next starred in Sanjay Gadhvi's romantic comedy Mere Yaar Ki Shaadi Hai (2002) alongside Uday Chopra, Jimmy Sheirgill and debutante Tulip Joshi. It opened to mixed reviews from critics upon release, with praise for Basu's performance, and emerged as a moderate commercial success at the box office. Her next film that year, David Dhawan's action comedy Chor Machaaye Shor alongside Deol, emerged as her first critical and commercial failure. The same year, she made her Telugu film debut with a supporting role in the revisionist western film Takkari Donga opposite Mahesh Babu and Lisa Ray. Her next film, the thriller Gunaah, again opposite Morea, also emerged as a critical and commercial failure. Her portrayal of a cop who loves a convict and tries to reform him earned her scathing reviews from critics, with Derek Elley of Variety stating that Basu was miscast as the "idealistic cop".

In 2003, Basu starred in Pooja Bhatt's erotic thriller Jism alongside debutant John Abraham, in which she portrayed the seductive, ambitious wife of a millionaire, who indulges in an extramarital affair with an alcoholic lawyer and plots to kill her husband. She and Abraham began a nine year long relationship while shooting for the film. It received mixed reviews upon release, but Basu earned praise for her portrayal of a femme fatale, with Taran Adarsh of Bollywood Hungama commenting, "...the real show stealer is Basu; her sexy look and seductive deep voice, in contrast with her cold and calculating personality, makes her the most impressive femme fatale since Zeenat Aman and Parveen Babi." The film emerged as a sleeper hit at the box-office, with several trade analysts attributing its commercial success to Basu's popularity. Jism ranked at 92 in a poll conducted by Channel 4 the top 100 sexiest movie scenes. Basu's performance in the film earned her a nomination for the Filmfare Award for Best Villain. However her next release, Rohit Shetty's directorial debut Zameen alongside Ajay Devgn and Abhishek Bachchan, emerged as a critical and commercial failure.

Basu had five releases in 2004, all of which received scathing critical reviews and emerged as commercial disasters at the box office. She began the year with the musical romance Ishq Hai Tumse in her third collaboration with Morea. She then collaborated for the second time with Vikram Bhatt in her next release, the psychological romantic thriller Aetbaar. She played the role of a young woman who falls in love with a psychopath. Rediff.com noted that "... The characters are not convincing, the plot is not fast-paced or interesting." Her next film was Mani Shankar's fantasy science fiction film Rudraksh, based on the Indian epic Ramayana. She then starred in the supernatural horror film Rakht as a tarot card reader trying to solve a murder mystery. Shruti Bhasin of PlanetBollywood wrote, "Basu impresses in a different look and role." Her final release that year was Anil Sharma's psychological thriller Madhoshi opposite Abraham. Her performance of a mentally unstable woman was generally well received.

In 2005, she appeared in the thriller Chehraa alongside Morea, which was a critical and commercial failure. This was followed by the musical love triangle Barsaat alongside Deol and Priyanka Chopra, which also received mixed-to-negative reviews from critics. Taran Adarsh commented, "As an actor, she [Basu] does show sparks only towards the end." It also emerged as a commercial failure at the box office. She next starred in the Tamil romantic comedy Sachein, alongside Vijay and Genelia D'Souza, which proved to be a box office hit. She then appeared in Anees Bazmee's comedy No Entry which grossed ₹750 million (US$7.8 million) at the box office, ranking as the highest-grossing Hindi film of the year. Basu portrayed a bargirl who acts as the wife of two men. The film received positive reviews, and she earned her first nomination for the Filmfare Award for Best Supporting Actress for her performance in the film. Her last release of the year was Prakash Jha's crime action film Apaharan, alongside Devgn and Nana Patekar, which was a critical and commercial success. During this period, she refused to act in art films due to salary problems.

=== Commercial success and established actress (2006–2009) ===
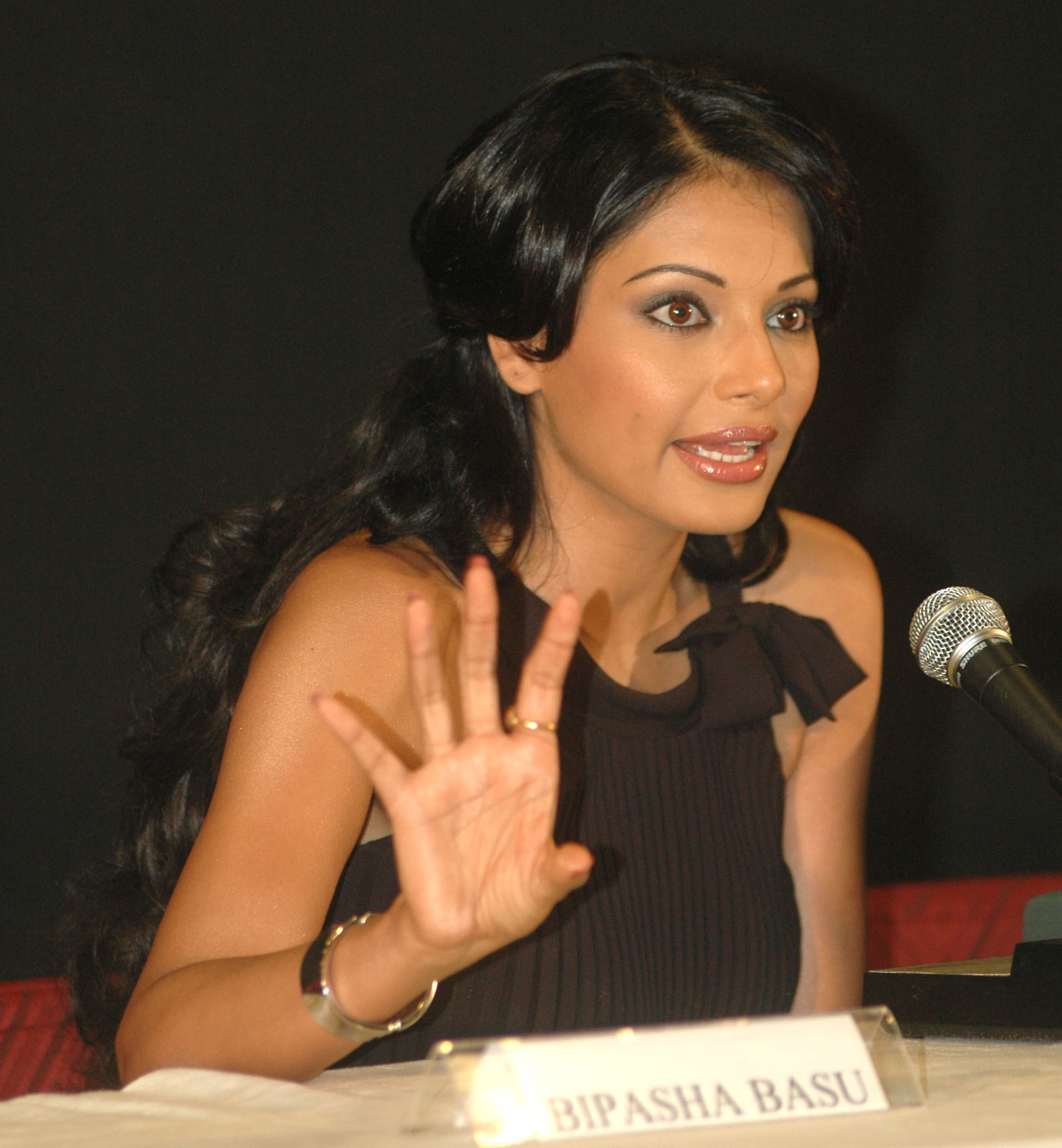
Basu at a press conference at the 37th International Film Festival of India in 2006

Basu established herself as a leading actress of Hindi cinema in 2006. The year saw her star in four major releases — the comedy Phir Hera Pheri, the comedy drama Corporate, the crime drama Omkara and the action thriller Dhoom 2 — all of which performed well critically and commercially.

Phir Hera Pheri saw her star alongside Akshay Kumar to portray a con woman who steals ₹10 million from the protagonists. The film received mixed-to-positive reviews and emerged as a commercial success, ranking as the eighth highest-grossing Hindi film of the year. In Madhur Bhandarkar's Corporate, she gave up her glamorous look to portray a businesswoman who has no qualms in taking advantage of her sexuality to con the CEO of a rival company. Her performance in the film earned her critical acclaim, as well as her second nomination for the Filmfare Award for Best Actress. However, it was moderate success at the box-office.

In Vishal Bhardwaj's adaptation of Othello, Omkara, Basu played the role of Billo Chamanbahar (Bianca), alongside an ensemble cast of Devgn, Kareena Kapoor, Saif Ali Khan, Konkona Sen Sharma and Vivek Oberoi. She caught the attention of the public with her dance number "Beedi", which was highly popular in India and overseas. Moreover, her performance also earned positive reviews, with critic Rajeev Masand of CNN-IBN writing, "...Basu is brought in to lend oomph and she highly succeeds in doing that."

Basu's last year of 2006 was Dhoom 2, where she again starred alongside an ensemble cast of Hrithik Roshan, Bachchan, Aishwarya Rai and Uday Chopra. She played the dual role of a cop and an NRI. She became the talk of the town for donning a bikini in the film; to prepare for this scene she reportedly ate only oranges for three days and trained hard. The film, and Basu's performance, received positive reviews from critics upon release, with Nikhat Kazmi of The Times of India commenting, "Aah Bipasha! Looks great, brings back the bikini to Bollywood, and acts well, thus doing more than just slipping into the shadows like a pretty accessory." Dhoom 2 emerged as a major blockbuster at the box office, grossing ₹1,513.89 million (US$16 million) worldwide, ranking as the highest-grossing Hindi film of the year and the highest-grossing Hindi film of all time at the time. As of 2024, it ranks as the highest grosser of Basu's career.

In 2007, her only appearance was in Vivek Agnihotri's sports drama Dhan Dhana Dhan Goal. The film saw her perform alongside frequent co-star John Abraham as the physiotherapist of a football team. Despite hype prior to release, it opened to mixed-to-negative reviews from critics, and was a commercial failure at the box office. Her dance number "Billo Rani" became quite popular and earned her the nickname "Billo Rani", though equal credit is due to Omkara in which her name was Billo Chamanbahar.

In 2008, she teamed up again with Abbas–Mustan for the crime thriller Race. She played the role of Sonia, who is stuck in a love triangle between two brothers (played by Saif Ali Khan and Akshaye Khanna) and who ends up murdering one of them. The film was a commercial success at the box office, grossing ₹680 million (US$7.1 million) worldwide, ranking as the fifth highest-grossing Hindi film of the year. Her performance, like the film, was appreciated by critics with Taran Adarsh citing it as "her best work so far. She's superb!"

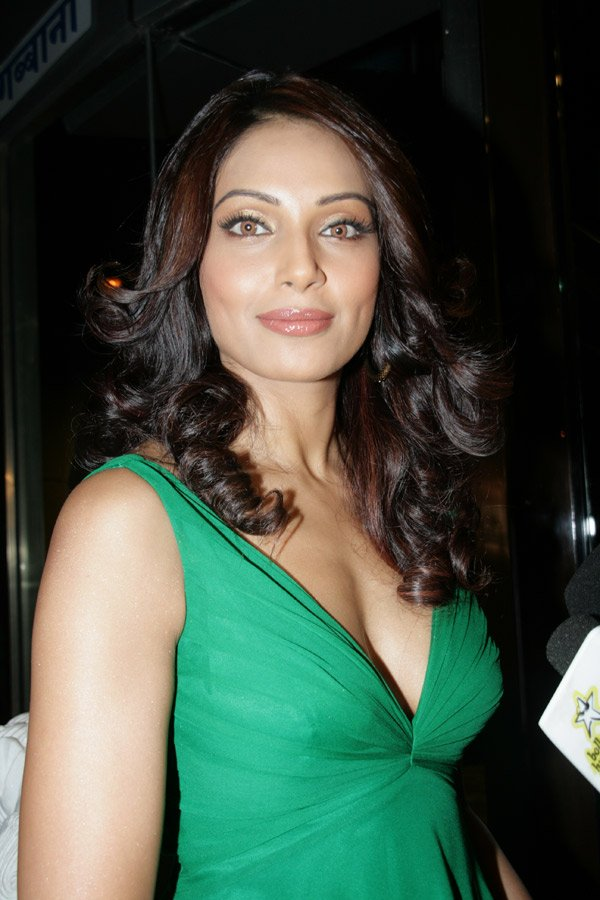
Basu at the success party of Race in 2008

Basu next starred alongside Ranbir Kapoor, Deepika Padukone and Minissha Lamba in Siddharth Anand's romantic comedy Bachna Ae Haseeno as a successful supermodel who finds it hard to forgive her ex-lover for betraying her. The film received mixed-to-positive reviews from critics upon release, with widespread praise for Basu's performance. It emerged as a commercial success at the box office, ranking as the eighth highest-grossing Hindi film of the year. Her performance in the film earned her a second nomination for the Filmfare Award for Best Supporting Actress. She completed 2008 with a special appearance in the song "Phir Milenge Chalte Chalte" opposite Shah Rukh Khan in Aditya Chopra's romantic comedy Rab Ne Bana Di Jodi.

Her first release in 2009, the science fiction thriller Aa Dekhen Zara opposite Neil Nitin Mukesh, received mixed reviews from critics upon release, and emerged as a commercial failure at the box office. However, her next film, Rohit Shetty's comedy All the Best: Fun Begins performed moderately well, with her comic role being appreciated by fans.

Basu later appeared in an unglamorous and challenging role in Rituparno Ghosh's Bengali film, Shob Charitro Kalponik. "I love saris and I'm wearing a lot of them in Ritu's film," she said. The film, and her performance, received high praise from critics upon release. Critic Subhash K. Jha spoke high of her, and said, "Basu pulls out all stops to deliver her career best performance. Her moments of anguish before and after her screen-husband's death are expressed in tones of cathartic conviction that we never knew existed within Basu." He also compared her with the multiple-award-winning actress, Shabana Azmi, commenting that Basu's anguished portrayal of bereavement could only be equalled by Azmi.

=== Continued work (2010–2013) ===
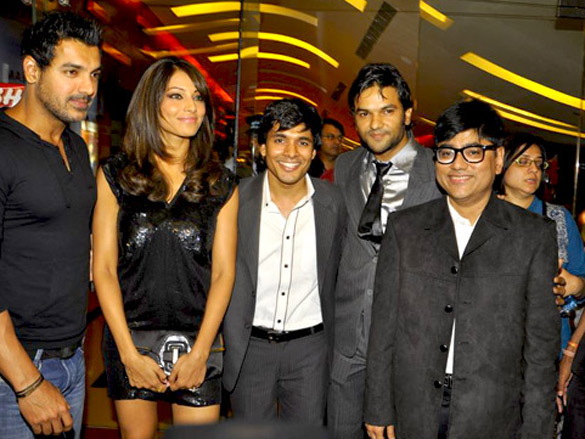
Basu with the cast of Pankh (2010)

Basu's first release in 2010 was Sudipto Chattopadhyaya's Pankh, where she apperared as an imaginary character who exists in the protagonist's mind. She was then featured as a Kashmiri girl alongside Sanjay Dutt, Anupam Kher and Kunal Kapoor in Rahul Dholakia's drama thriller Lamhaa, which explored socio-political problems in Kashmir. Principal photography of Lamhaa was disrupted many times by the locals due to its controversial theme. During the shooting of Lamhaa, she left the sets at Anantnag and headed back to Mumbai, citing she was afraid of the crowd there. Producer Bunty Walia considered replacing her with Vidya Balan, but she returned for the shoot later with necessary security arrangements. Lamhaa opened to mixed reviews from critics upon release, but Basu's performance received praise. NDTV Movies wrote, "Basu sinks herself into her character imparting a dramatic resonance into the role without resorting to stock expressions. The sequence where she gets mauled by militant women is as traumatic to watch as it must have been for Basu to shoot."

Basu's next appearance that year was in Priyadarshan's action thriller Aakrosh as the wife of a ruthless cop who helps the police investigating honor killings in their village. Nikhat Kazmi of The Times of India commented, "Basu actually doesn't have much to do and does seem to be miscast as the much-abused, bruised and battered wife of Paresh Rawal". Both Lamhaa and Aakrosh were commercial failures at the box office.

Basu's next release was the 2011 action thriller Dum Maaro Dum, alongside Abhishek Bachchan and Rana Daggubati. Talking of the film, she said, "My next release is Dum Maaro Dum, in which I play a lively, colourful, happy-go-lucky girl called Zoey, who is the representation of Goa as we see it." The film performed reasonably well at the box office and met with mixed-to-positive reviews from critics.

Basu then finished shooting for her first English film project, Roland Joffé's Belgian romance time travel adventure Singularity in which she portrayed a Maratha warrior. The film then went through several delays and release struggles for nearly two years.

In 2012, Basu collaborated with Abbas–Mustan for the third time in the heist action thriller Players, which became the first Hindi film release of 2012. The film was an official remake of The Italian Job. Majorly hyped prior to release, Players was a commercial disaster at the box office, and was negatively compared to The Italian Job and highly criticised for its execution and performances, including that of Basu.

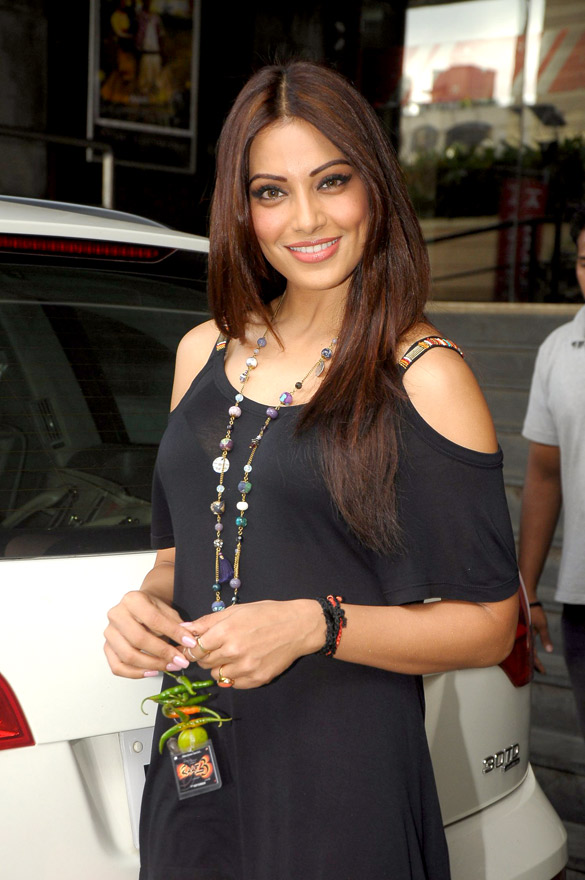
Basu promoting Raaz 3 in 2012

Basu's next release of the year was the supernatural horror thriller Raaz 3: The Third Dimension directed by Vikram Bhatt. Co-starring Emraan Hashmi and Esha Gupta, the film proved a major commercial success at the box office, grossing ₹1.01 billion (US$10 million) worldwide. It emerged as the highest-grossing Hindi horror film of all time and became Basu's first commercial success after a period of relatively poor reception. The film opened to mixed-to-positive reviews upon release, with high praise for Basu's performance. Subhash K. Jha of IANS said, "It's Basu who holds together the feverish proceedings. She delivers a full-bodied gutsy performance."

In 2013, Basu first appeared in a guest appearance in Race 2, a direct sequel of Race (2008), where she reprised her role of Sonia Martin from the first film, in a flashback scene. She then starred alongside Nawazuddin Siddiqui in the horror film Aatma directed by Suparn Verma. The film and Basu's performance received mixed reviews from critics upon release. Filmfare stated, "This is one of Bipasha's better performances. She emotes well even in the really tough scenes where she is being abused." Another reviewer from India TV news noted that "Bipasha Basu as a frightening mother is decent" and remarked that her performance in Raaz 3D was stronger. NDTV praised Basu's deep role, but also commented that they felt the film wasn't particularly frightening.

The same year, Basu's English film Singularity, now renamed as The Lovers finally released, but she received mixed performance for her performance in that film as well. The film remains Basu's only foreign film to date.

=== Career slowdown and intermittent work (2014–2020) ===
In 2014, Basu appeared in two films of diametrically opposite genres – the first was Sajid Khan's comedy Humshakals. The film was a critical and commercial disaster, and is considered one of the worst Bollywood films ever made. Basu didn't even participate in the film's promotions because she was "extremely disturbed by the result" and stated, "Humshakals was the worst experience of my life".

Basu's second release was Vikram Bhatt's monster horror film Creature 3D alongside debutant Imran Abbas. This film was another critical and commercial failure. Regarding Basu's role, Anupama Chopra of Film Companion wrote, "Basu plays Ahana, the owner of a boutique hotel while her admirer is played by the totally forgettable actor (Abbas). The creature had more personality than all of them put together."

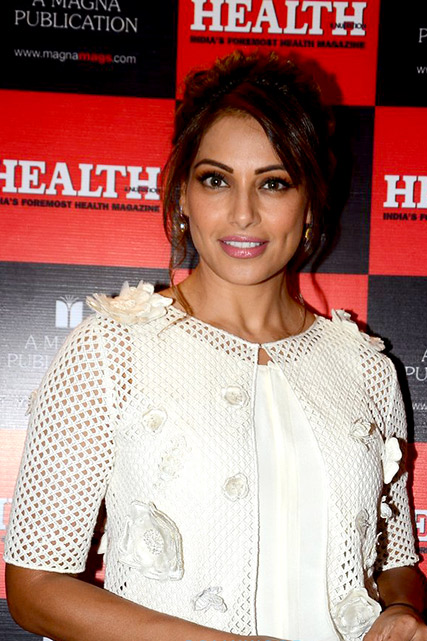
Basu at an event in 2017

In 2015, Basu featured in Bhushan Patel's romance horror film Alone opposite Karan Singh Grover. The film performed moderately well at the box office, and received mixed reviews from critics upon release, with praise for Basu's dual role. India TV reviewed the film and wrote that, "With some genuine scary moments and Basu-Grover's scorching chemistry, Alone stands apart from numerous horrible horror flicks made in the past," and also stated, "Basu just takes her act to another level." In the same year, she made her debut on Hindi television, by hosting &TV's anthology horror fiction series Darr Sabko Lagta Hai.

Following her marriage to her Alone co-star Karan Singh Grover in 2016, Basu retired from acting to focus on her personal life. Two years later, she made a cameo appearance as herself in the comedy Welcome to New York (2018).

In 2020, she made a brief return with her OTT debut in the MX Player's crime thriller series Dangerous, also starring her husband Grover. The web series received mixed-to-negative reviews from critics upon release. A critic from Hindustan Times observed that Basu, as Neha Singh, attempts to "raise the heat" alongside Karan Singh Grover, but her performance is undermined by rushed plot twists and an underwritten character. News18.com gave the series a rating of 1 star, saying that, "A bland and clichéd plot topped with forced sexual tension makes Dangerous a rather tedious watch."

== Other ventures ==
=== Music video appearances ===
In 1998, Basu appeared in the music video "Tu" for Sonu Nigam's album, Kismat that got her noticed by many Bollywood stalwarts and helped her in getting film offers. In 2000, Basu was again seen in Sonu Nigam's album Jaan, in the song "Tera Milna". In 2004, she made a guest appearance in Jay Sean's music video "Stolen".

=== Fitness and wellness projects ===
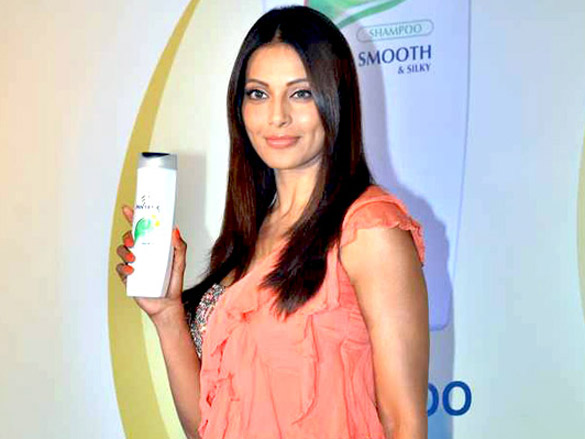
Basu at the Pantene launch in 2012

Aside from films, Basu has been an advocate of physical fitness. In 2005, she released her first fitness DVD jointly with John Abraham, titled Bollywood Bodies.

In 2010 she released her first solo fitness DVD called Love Yourself: Fit & Fabulous You, which emphasised being strong, healthy, and loving oneself. The DVD consisted of a 60-day routine for weight loss, including a beginner's workout, an advanced workout and an "easy tone" workout. She was also the brand ambassador of Sugar Free, which helped her in promoting the DVD. Hiren Gada, director of Shemaroo Entertainment, said, "A celebrity like Basu, genuinely believes in staying healthy. She is also passionate about fitness."

In September 2011, Basu launched her second fitness DVD titled Break Free, a 30-minute dance routine, and the follow-up to Basu's first workout video, continuing the Love Yourself series.

In January 2014, Basu launched the third instalment of her Love Yourself DVD fitness series, Unleash, an advanced training routine including plyometrics and focusing more on power and speed, while strengthening the bones and improving muscle coordination. Later in 2014, many of her fitness workout videos were released for free on distributor Shemaroo Entertainment's health-focussed YouTube channel, Shemaroo Good Health 24/7.

=== Stage performances ===
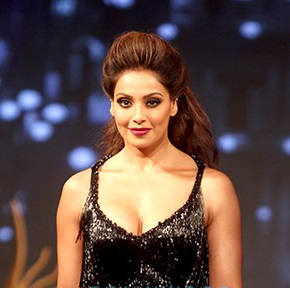
Basu at the IIFA Fashion Extravaganza in 2015

Basu has been a regular performer at several Hindi film award ceremonies like Filmfare and IIFA. In the summer of 2013, she performed live alongside Atif Aslam, Shaan and Malaika Arora for the first time in a series of concerts in Birmingham and London. In July 2020, Basu posted on her Instagram account, expressing how she misses the energy and exuberance of performing in front of a live audience and adding that she "can't wait for it to happen again soon."

=== Lifestyle brand ===
In 2015, Basu, Malaika Arora, and Sussanne Khan launched their own shopping portal "The Label Life". Basu's section of the portal included makeup, statement jewels, shoes and bags.

== In the media ==
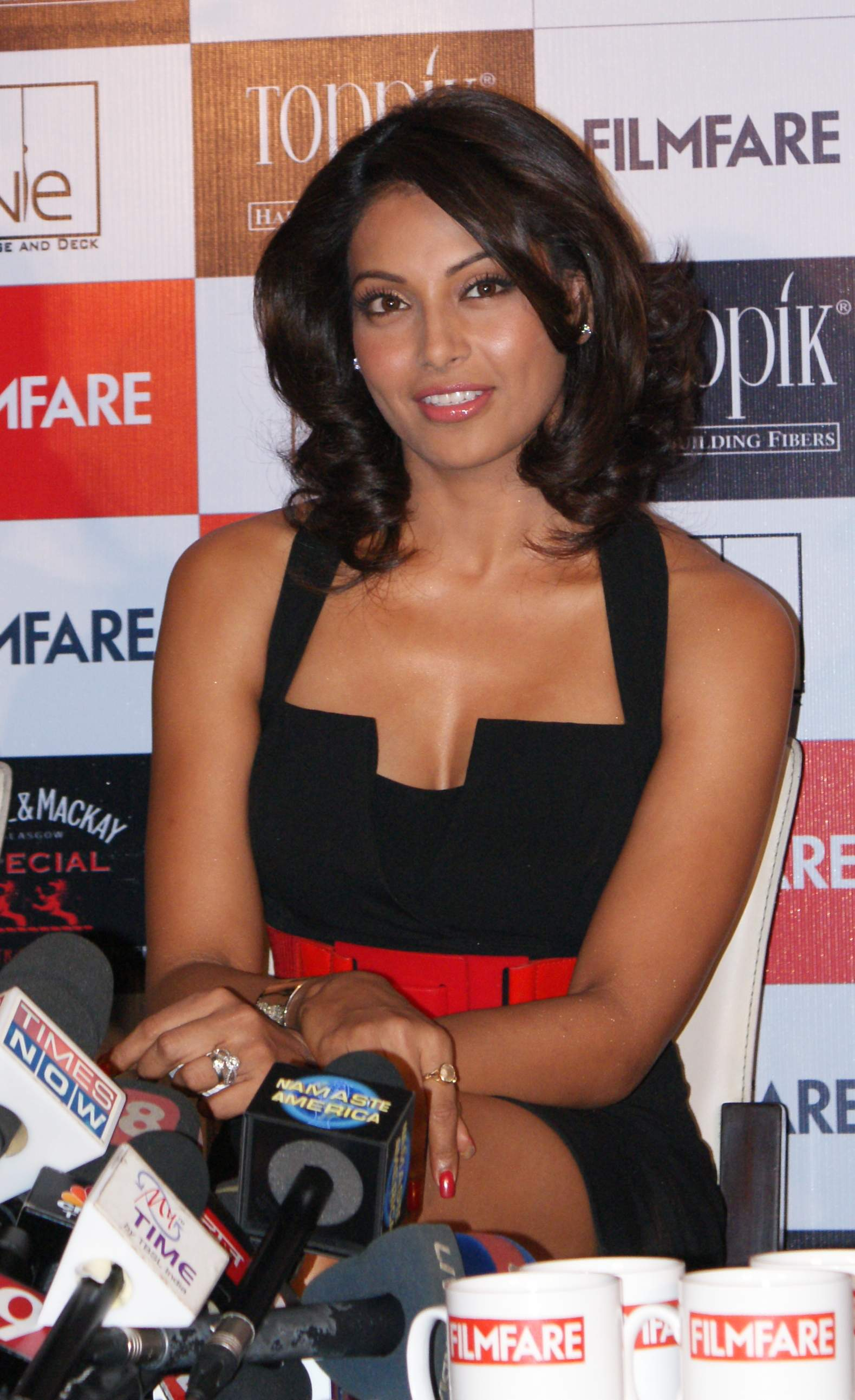
Basu at the launch of Filmfare cover issue in 2009

Basu is considered as one of the most popular actresses of 2000s in Hindi cinema and frequently cited in the media as a sex symbol. She is also known by a variety of nicknames that play on her given name, including Bonnie, Bips, Bip, B, BB, and Bona. Filmfare placed her 7th and 9th in their "Top Ten Actresses" list of 2003 and 2004 respectively. Rediff.com placed her 2nd in its "Bollywood's Most Beautiful Actresses" list in 2004. In Rediff.com's "Best Bollywood Actresses", Basu was placed 3rd in 2005 and 7th in 2006 and 1st in 2008

In 2006, she became the Most Desirable Woman in India. Eastern Eye named her the "Sexiest Woman in Asia" in 2005 and 2007. In 2009, she topped the Maxim's "Hot 100" list. On the Times 50 Most Desirable Women list, she ranked 8th in 2011, 13th in 2012, and 7th in 2013. She appeared in Forbes India's 2012 Celebrity 100 list, where she placed 25th with an estimated annual income of ₹268.5 million (US$2.8 million). She also appeared from 2013 to 2016 in Forbes Celebrity 100 list with the lowest ranking 71st. She is the only Indian actress to be featured in the World Fashion Model Directory in Global Top 1500 whereas her colleague Ujjwala Raut is in Top 5000. In 2013, she was ranked at 67 as one of the World's Most 99 Desirable Women by AskMen.com. Playboy magazine also ranked her at 7 as one of the top 10 desirable women in the world. Basu is also a celebrity endorser for brands including Dabur, Reebok, Gili, Panasonic, Pantene, Emami and Alkermes.

== Personal life ==
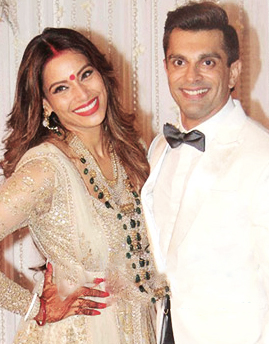
Basu with husband Karan Singh Grover, at their Reception in 2016

Basu met actor Dino Morea on a blind date arranged by their friends in 1998, while Morea was a popular supermodel at that time. They were a celebrated and talked-about pair and featured in multiple films and modeling assignments. The couple ended their relationship in 2002. Years later, Morea admitted that he initiated the end of their relationship during the filming of Raaz (2002), and noted that it was tough on Basu and she was upset.

Post her break-up with Morea, Basu was reported to be dating her Jism co-star John Abraham. Both Basu and Abraham maintained a prominent relationship for nine years, from 2003 to their eventual breakup in 2011. Basu then briefly dated actor Harman Baweja, but they broke up in 2014.

While shooting for Alone in 2014, Basu began dating her co-star Karan Singh Grover, a popular television actor known for his work in Hindi TV series like Dill Mill Gayye and Qubool Hai. Basu and Grover eventually tied the knot on 30 April 2016 in a traditional Bengali wedding ceremony, after dating for over a year. They couple welcomed their first child, a baby girl named Devi Basu Singh Grover in November 2022. In 2023, Basu revealed that Devi was diagnosed with ventricular septal defect (VSD), a condition involving two holes in the heart, just three days after birth. Devi underwent open‑heart surgery when she was three months old, and has been doing well since the successful procedure.
