= Corporate (2006 film) =

- Theatrical release poster
- Directed by: Madhur Bhandarkar
- Screenplay by: Madhur Bhandarkar; Ajay Monga
- Story by: Madhur Bhandarkar; Manoj Tyagi; Ajay Monga
- Produced by: Rahim Khan
- Starring: Bipasha Basu; Kay Kay Menon; Minissha Lamba; Raj Babbar; Rajat Kapoor
- Cinematography: Mahesh Limaye
- Edited by: Devendra Murdeshwar
- Music by: Songs: Shamir Tandon; Score: Raju Singh
- Production company: Sahara One Motion Pictures
- Release date: 7 July 2006
- Running time: 142 minutes
- Country: India
- Language: Hindi
- Budget: ₹67.5 Million INR
- Box office: ₹150.6 Million INR

Corporate is a 2006 Indian Hindi-language drama film written and directed by Madhur Bhandarkar. The film stars Bipasha Basu, Kay Kay Menon, Payal Rohatgi, Minissha Lamba and Raj Babbar. The film revolves around a game between two powerful industrialists. It was released on 7 July 2006, and was a moderate commercial success. For her performance, Bipasha Basu won several awards for best actress.

== Plot ==
Corporate revolves around the power games between two industrialists, the Sehgal Group of Industries (SGI), owned by Vinay Sehgal, and the Marwah Group of Industries (MGI), owned by Dharmesh Marwah. The two companies are traditional rivals in the food and beverage products business. Nishigandha "Nishi" Dasgupta is the vice president of SGI, while Vinay's brother-in-law Ritesh joins in later as senior vice president.

Ashwini, a politician backed by Vinay, becomes the Union Finance Minister, which helps the SGI enter a lucrative partnership with international food products giants Friscon.

In a CII meeting, the state Finance Minister Gulabrao declared that a public sector unit (PSU) is for sale. Both companies pounce into the competition using every tactic they have to outperform each other. But the last-minute politics by Dharmesh with Gulabrao led to the PSU going to the MGI, leaving Vinay disappointed.

However, Nishi charms MGI CEO Pervez and is then able to steal critical information from his laptop computer: she finds out that Dharmesh had been misleading the media that the MGI were planning to manufacture mineral water in the plant, whereas in reality the plan was to manufacture a mint-based soft drink. The SGI publicly announces that it will be launching its own mint-based soft drink, which it has named "Just Chill," preempting the MGI's planned launch. Dharmesh traces the leak to Pervez and fires him.

Ten days before the launch of the drink, Vinay learns that the FDA has found a large amount of pesticides in the drink. But he cold-heartedly decides to launch the product by bribing the FDA agents, though CEO Naveen resigns from the SGI. The drink is a great success, but another SGI executive is unhappy that Ritesh is being made the CEO, and he leaks the secret about "Just Chill" containing pesticides to Dharmesh, who, along with Gulabrao, blows up the issue in the media, leading to a raid on the SGI plants and a case on the Sehgals. Vinay decides that the only solution is for an SGI employee who is not a member of the Sehgal family to take the blame for the blunder. Nishi is chosen for that role.

Ritesh is called on by his sister Chhaya Sehgal, where she asks him to convince Nishi to sacrifice for the company. Initially disagreeing, Ritesh agrees to convince Nishi on the insistence of Sehgal, as he promises that Nishi would be released by the Enquiry Commission soon. A foreign investor holding a major stake in Friscon urges Ashwini to settle the dispute between the two, as this would lead to capital flight and foreign investors would pull back their investments, causing serious havoc in the business market. Ashwini discusses the issue with Gulabrao, and both the ministers mediate between Dharmesh and Vinay to settle down the issue. Dharmesh agrees to withdraw all the allegations suited through the NGOs and draw the limitations in Friscon. However, Gulabrao refuses to release Nishi as it would dent his chances of chief ministership as elections roar near.

Meanwhile, Ritesh learns that Nishi is pregnant with his baby. Ritesh, angry about it, threatens to expose Vinay in front of the media if Nishi is not released within 48 hours. The next day he is found dead, having fallen from the terrace of his apartment building. It is assumed to be suicide, but some think otherwise. The film ends with the narrator concluding that Dharmesh and Vinay are living happily in their world, whereas there is no place for emotions in the corporate world as Nishi is the victim of their tactics. The film shows Nishi still fighting the case after two years of the incident with her child.

== Cast ==
- Bipasha Basu as Nishigandha Dasgupta
- Kay Kay Menon as Ritesh Sahani
- Rajat Kapoor as Vinay Sehgal
- Raj Babbar as Dharmesh Marwah
- Minissha Lamba as Megha Apte
- Sameer Dattani as Anmol Rawat
- Harsh Chhaya as Naveen Shroff
- Bharat Dabholkar as Joe Rajan
- Kevin Green as Mr. Steve Jones
- Sandeep Mehta as Parvez Merchant
- Achint Kaur as Chhaya V. Seghal
- Lilette Dubey as Devyani Bakshi
- Ashok Pandit as Ashok Pandit
- Manoj Joshi as Monty, film director
- Anil Nagrath as Ballu
- Amar Talwar as Anand Ruia
- Vinay Apte as Gulabrao
- Mukesh Tyagi as Mukesh Tyagi
- Viju Khote as Megha's father
- Navni Parihar as Dharmesh's wife
- Dolly Thakore
- Suhas Avchat
- Brinda Parekh
- Hamsa Nandini
- Sunayana Fauzdar
- Bikramjeet Kanwarpal
- Girish Oak as Ashwini Dayal
- Manohar Kanungo in a special appearance
- Kailash Kher as special appearance in the song "O Sikander"
- Javed Akhtar as himself
- Pralhad Kakkar in a special appearance
- Vasundhara Das as herself
- Payal Rohatgi as self
- Atul Kulkarni as narrator

== Soundtrack ==
The soundtrack was composed by Shamir Tandon with lyrics written by Sandeep Nath.

#	Title	Singer(s)	Duration
1	"Lamha Lamha Zindagi Hai"	Asha Bhosle	06:14
2	"Lamha Lamha Zindagi Hai " (Sad)	Asha Bhosle	01:44
3	"O Sikander"	Kailash Kher, Sapna Mukherjee	06:26
4	"O Sikander" (Desi Mix)	Kailash Kher, Sapna Mukherjee, Sonu Kakkar	05:18
5	"O Sikander" (International Dance)	Kailash Kher, Sapna Mukherjee, S-Endz, DJ Swami	05:42
6	"Peele Peele"	Sangeet Haldipur, Vasundhara Das	04:37
7	"Yahan Sab Ko Sab Corporate Title"	Alisha Chinai, Gary Lawyer	04:09
8	"Yahan Sab Ko Sab" (Easy Mix)	Sameer Dattani, Rajat Kapoor, Payal Rohatgi	04:34

== Reception ==
A critic from BBC wrote that "a provocative social commentary, with all the elements of good filmmaking keenly in evidence, the portrait painted of the corporate world is deeply disturbing. For all its startling realism the film is intensely watchable". A critic from Rediff.com wrote that "with its urban premise, intricate dialogue and stark realism, Corporate might not be a box office smash. It's still a smart, gripping, honest film. And that should count for something". A critic from The Times of India recommended the film to "watch it for its topicality and the novelty of the story".

== Awards ==
Bipasha Basu won the following awards for best actress:

- 2007: GIFA Best Actress
- 2007: Bollywood Movie Award – Best Actress
- 2007: Anadalok Purashkar Award, Best Actress
- 2007: Anand Bazar Patrika Award, Best Actress

She received further nominations for Star Screen Awards, Filmfare Awards and Zee Cine Awards. Kay Kay Menon was also nominated for GIFA Best Supporting Actor.
