= Ajnabee (2001 film) =

2001 Indian film by Abbas–Mustan

- Theatrical release poster
- Directed by: Abbas–Mustan
- Screenplay by: Robin Bhatt; Shyam Goel; Neeraj Vora; Sanjeev Duggal
- Dialogues by: Shyam Goel
- Story by: Neeraj Vora
- Produced by: Vijay Galani
- Starring: Akshay Kumar; Bobby Deol; Kareena Kapoor; Bipasha Basu
- Cinematography: Rajan Kinagi
- Edited by: Hussain A. Burmawala
- Music by: Songs: Anu Malik; Background Score: Surinder Sodhi
- Production company: Venus Records & Tapes
- Distributed by: Eros International
- Release date: 21 September 2001
- Running time: 165 minutes
- Country: India
- Language: Hindi
- Budget: ₹17 crore
- Box office: ₹31.83 crore

Ajnabee (transl. Stranger) is a 2001 Indian Hindi-language action thriller film directed by Abbas–Mustan and produced by Vijay Galani. It stars Akshay Kumar, Bobby Deol, Kareena Kapoor and Bipasha Basu in her debut, with Johnny Lever, Dalip Tahil, Narendra Bedi and Sharat Saxena in supporting roles. The film is an unofficial adaptation of the 1992 American thriller Consenting Adults. The music is composed by Anu Malik.

The film was released on 21 September 2001, Kapoor's 21st birthday. It received mixed reviews from critics with praise for the performances of Kumar and Basu. The film was a moderate success at box office, grossing ₹31 crore against a budget of ₹17 crore. Kumar won the Filmfare Award for Best Performance in a Negative Role while Basu won the award for Best Female Debut.

== Plot ==
After chance encounters and misunderstandings, Raj and Priya Malhotra fall in love get married and move to Switzerland. They meet their neighbours Vicky and Sonia and 4 of them become best of friends. During their vacation, Raj sees Vikram kissing another woman. A confused Raj becomes even more shocked as Sonia starts flirting and hitting on him. He rejects her which Vikram finds out. As Sonia becomes more forward in her advances, Vicky manipulates the scenario leading to Raj and Sonia getting paired while himself (Vicky) getting paired with Priya. On the last day, Vicky casually talks to Raj about wife-swapping. Vicky eagerly suggests they should also try it out and suggests that Raj has sex with Sonia. Vicky simultaneously requests Raj to let him spend the night having sex with Priya. Raj is disgusted by the offer, and an argument breaks out between the men. With Priya being unaware of the whole situation going around her, she manages to reconcile Raj and Vicky on the eve of Vicky's birthday a few days later. The two men celebrate by getting drunk together. Vicky Again suggests Raj to become Vicky and asks whether he(Vicky) could become Raj just for the night and manages to send a drunk Raj into his house. At the same time Vicky goes on to Raj's house and Priya is surprised to see Vicky instead of Raj.

The next day Raj wakes up to find a partially clothed woman in bed with him and realizes he was tricked and is in Vicky's house. He quickly runs back to his house only to see Priya happy and relaxed. He enquires if Vicky Came over last night to which Priya confirms Vicky coming over as Raj had sent him over. She states she fulfilled his request when he came over as it was his birthday and didn't want to disappoint him by refusing his request. She further states it should not be a regular occurrence and Vicky needs to control himself but won't mind if it's on special occasions. After listening to what Priya just said, Raj goes for a run. Unable to forget what Priya had said, he thinks Vicky successfully convinced Priya to continue Wife-Swapping for the night by seducing her and they romanced each other with wild passion in every corner of the house and they ended the night with Priya giving Vicky his gift by allowing him to have Sex with her in the bedroom. That same morning Sonia is found dead and Raj is accused of her murder since his fingerprints are found on the murder weapon – an alcohol bottle. Vicky claims how the idea of wife swapping came from Raj, and while Vicky just spent the night in Raj's house, Raj tried to force Sonia and later killed her. While in Jail, Vicky visits him and gloats about framing Raj and offers 1.4 million towards taking care of Priya in exchange for Raj accepting he killed Sonia. During court proceedings, everything seems to be going against Raj. Determined to prove his innocence, Raj manages to escape from the court. He meets Priya, who eventually believes in his innocence and aids him in finding out what really happened. Their neighbors, the Malhotras recall that Vicky entered the house the night of the murder with someone. They decide to search Vikram's house, only to be interrupted by Vikram, who calls the police and then reveals that everything was planned. Raj escapes in a car with Priya.

Raj finds a boarding pass that belongs to Sonia Bajaj, However, Sonia was supposedly murdered on that night. Raj confronts Vikram, who finally explains the devious plan – the woman he kissed in Mauritius was his actual wife, Sonia Bajaj. In contrast, the woman with him is his girlfriend, Neeta. Vikram, a struggling musician, married wealthy heiress Sonia and convinced her to take out an insurance plan of $100 million on herself. He then formulated a plan with Neeta to have Sonia killed and get the insurance money.

Vikram boasts about pinning the murder on Raj. However, Raj takes Vikram to a computer and shows him his empty bank account. Raj says that he had guessed the password, "Everything is planned", something that Vikram used to say a lot, and used it to transfer the money back to the insurance company. Raj also reveals that everything Vikram said has been recorded. A fight erupts between the two and Neeta dies in the conflict. Angered at losing Neeta, Vikram gets aggressive, killing the insurance officer. He chases Priya to kill her, but Raj impales Vikram with an anchor from the cruise ship, killing him. Raj and Priya return to India, after the former is finally proven innocent.

== Cast ==
- Akshay Kumar as Vikram "Vicky" Bajaj
- Bobby Deol as Raj Malhotra
- Kareena Kapoor as Priya Malhotra, Raj's girlfriend, later wife
- Bipasha Basu as Neeta / Fake Sonia Bajaj, Vicky's accomplice
- Johnny Lever as Bhanu Pradhan
- Amita Nangia as Champa Devi
- Dalip Tahil as Priya's father
- Sharat Saxena as Insurance Officer
- Sheela Sharma as Veena Chandra Devi
- Narendra Bedi as Lakhan Pal
- Mink Brar (special appearance) as Real Sonia Bajaj, Vicky's wife

== Production ==
The climax of the film was shot in Muscat, Dubai and Bahrain on the Indian-owned cruise liner Ocean Majesty. Initially Shah Rukh Khan was offered the role of Vikram Bajaj, but he was not keen on playing a negative character.

== Soundtrack ==
Ajnabee

Soundtrack album by Anu Malik
- Released: 4 July 2001
- Genre: Feature film soundtrack
- Length: 50:38
- Language: Hindi
- Label: Tips Music

The soundtrack for Ajnabee is composed by Anu Malik and the lyrics, penned by Sameer. It is released by Tips Music.

In 2011, ten years after the release of Ajnabee, Malik claimed that the song "Character Dheela" from the film Ready is an unauthorised copy of the song "Mohabbat Naam Hai" while informing the media that he will likely sue composer Pritam for plagiarism. According to the Indian trade website Box Office India, with around 2.2 million units sold, this film's soundtrack album was the year's sixth highest-selling. "Meri Zindagi Mein Ajnabee" marked the first slow romantic song rendered by Sunidhi Chauhan who later thanked Anu Malik who convinced the producers to use her voice for the title track. Whereas the biggest hit of the album "Mehbooba Mehbooba" kicked of Adnan Sami's career in Bollywood who already had found success in Indian Pop music industry.

No.	Title	Artist(s)	Length
1	"Mehbooba Mehbooba"	Adnan Sami, Sunidhi Chauhan	7:27
2	"Mohabbat Naam Hai Kiska"	Udit Narayan, Alka Yagnik	6:19
3	"Kasam Se Teri Aankhen Aaiya Re Aaiya"	Udit Narayan, Sonu Nigam, Alka Yagnik, Sunidhi Chauhan	5:55
4	"Meri Zindagi Mein Ajnabee"	Kumar Sanu, Sunidhi Chauhan	6:57
5	"Kaun Main Haan Tum"	Udit Narayan, Alka Yagnik, Bobby Deol, Akshay Kumar, Bipasha Basu, Kareena Kapoor	6:44
6	"Jab Tumhe Aashiqui Maloom"	Kumar Sanu	6:48
7	"Mujhko Neend Aa Rahi Hai" (Only in the uncut version)	Sonu Nigam, Sunidhi Chauhan	4:46
8	"Mehbooba Mehbooba E Groove" (Remix DJ Khalif)	Adnan Sami, Sunidhi Chauhan	4:20
9	"Dance Music" (Instrumental)		1:22

== Reception ==
=== Box office ===
The film grossed ₹31.83 crore worldwide.

=== Critical response ===
Taran Adarsh of IndiaFM gave the film 1.5 stars out of 5, writing, ″On the whole, AJNABEE tackles an audacious theme that the Indian audience will find hard to absorb and identify with. The film, which boasts of impressive names on and off the screen, will attract the audiences for the first few days, but its fall is imminent after the initial euphoria settles. A heavy price tag will also prove a deterrent for its investors.″ Sarita Tanwar of Rediff.com wrote, ″It has been shot at exotic locations, but the film has a shoddy feel to it. The camerawork jars; the filmmakers lose control of the script at the climax, when vague scenes are pieced together. The comic relief, spearheaded by Johny Lever, is loud and the insipid humour goes overboard. Sadly, this bold attempt is in vain. Ajnabee could have been the precursor of the new niche thriller. But its makers haven't displayed enough bravado. Watch Ajnabee once. Not for what it is. But for what it could have been.

In a retrospective review on film's 20th anniversary, Sampada Sharma of The Indian Express wrote, ″Ajnabee's world has people doing net banking in a way that makes you go 'What!?' and characters planning schemes that are half-witted to begin with, yet it makes you stick around for its performative dialogues, over-the-top acting and a plot so dramatic that you continue to watch just to see what bizarre thing will happen next. It's been 20 years since we saw this beautiful, delicious mess and revisiting it now is still a chuckle-worthy experience.″

== Awards and nominations ==
Awards	Category	Recipient	Result
Filmfare Awards	Best Villain	Akshay Kumar	Won
Filmfare Awards	Best Female Debut	Bipasha Basu	Won
Filmfare Awards	Best Actor in a Comic Role	Johny Lever	Nominated
Filmfare Awards	Best Playback Singer	Adnan Sami for "Mehbooba Mehbooba"	Nominated
Iffa Awards	Best Debut Actress	Bipasha Basu	Won
Iffa Awards	Fresh Face of the Year	Bipasha Basu	Won
Iffa Awards	Best Actress in a Supporting Role	Bipasha Basu	Nominated
Iffa Awards	Best Performance by an Actor in a Negative Role	Akshay Kumar	Won
Iffa Awards	Best Comic Actor	Johnny Lever	Nominated
Zee Cine Awards	Best Debut Actress	Bipasha Basu	Nominated
Zee Cine Awards	Best Villain	Akshay Kumar	Nominated
