= Global Indian Film Awards =

Award

Global Indian Film Awards (GIFA) was an awards ceremony held from 2005 to 2007, conceptualized and founded by Sameer Khan and Jordy Patel to acknowledge excellence in the Hindi film industry and honour artists in 28 categories across various genres, from acting to film making. It is held in a different country each year, 2005 in Dubai, Kuala Lumpur in 2006.

== Jury ==
The jury members for the first awards were Aziz Mirza, Om Puri, Firoz Nadiadwala, Kabir Bedi, Bharti Pradhan, Umesh Mehra and Priti Hiranandani. The ceremony was organised at Dubai's Al-Wasi Stadium from 25 to 27 January 2005.

The ceremony produced by Global Events, Dubai and is backed by Suniel Shetty, Chairman of Popcorn Entertainment. The jury members are: Jackie Shroff, Rati Agnihotri, Sajid Nadiadwala, Sandeep Chowta, Shyam Benegal, and Smita Thackeray.

== Awards ==
Category	2005		2006	
Category	Winners	For	Winners	For
Best Film	Shahrukh Khan	Main Hoon Na	Vidhu Vinod Chopra	Lage Raho Munnabhai
Best Director	Farah Khan	Main Hoon Na	Rakeysh Omprakash Mehra	Rang De Basanti
Best Actor	Shahrukh Khan	Swades	Hrithik Roshan	Krrish
Best Actress	Rani Mukerji	Hum Tum	Bipasha Basu	Corporate
Best Supporting Actor	Akshay Kumar	Mujhse Shaadi Karogi	Abhishek Bachchan	Kabhi Alvida Naa Kehna
Best Supporting Actress	Divya Dutta	Veer-Zaara	Soha Ali Khan	Rang De Basanti
Most Searched Male Actor on Internet			Shahrukh Khan	
Most Searched Female Actor on Internet			Priyanka Chopra	
Best Comedian	Arshad Warsi	Hulchul	Tusshar Kapoor	Golmaal
Best Villain	Priyanka Chopra; Suniel Shetty	Main Hoon Na Aitraaz	Saif Ali Khan	Omkara
Best Music Director	Pritam	Dhoom	A.R. Rahman	Rang De Basanti
Best Lyrics			Prasoon Joshi	Rang De Basanti
Best Playback Singer Female	Sunidhi Chauhan	Dhoom	Alka Yagnik	Kabhi Alvida Naa Kehna
Best Playback Singer Male	Abhijeet Bhattacharya	Main Hoon Na	Zubeen Garg	Gangster
Best Debut Director			Vikram Chopra	Fight Club - Members Only
Best Debut Actor			Upen Patel	36 China Town
Best Debut Actress	Gayatri Joshi	Swades	Kangana Ranaut	Gangster
Outstanding Contribution to Indian Cinema			Rakesh Roshan	
Best Story	Aditya Chopra	Veer-Zaara	Vidhu Vinod Chopra; Rajkumar Hirani	Lage Raho Munnabhai
Best Screenplay	Vishal Bhardwaj; Abbas Tyrewala	Maqbool	Rakeysh Omprakash Mehra; Rensil D'Silva	Rang De Basanti
Best Dialogues	Kunal Kohli	Hum Tum	Rajkumar Hirani; Abhijat Joshi	Lage Raho Munnabhai
Best Cinematographer	Christopher Popp	Lakshya	Tassaduq Hussain	Omkara
Best Editing	Rameshwar Bhagat	Dhoom	P S Bharti	Rang De Basanti
Best Background Music			A.R. Rahman	Rang De Basanti
Best Art Director	Sabu Cyril	Main Hoon Na	Samir Chanda	Rang De Basanti
Best Action	Allan Amin	Main Hoon Na	Shyam Kaushal; Tony Suiching	Krrish
Critics' Best Actor			Sanjay Dutt	Lage Raho Munnabhai
Critics' Best Actress			Bipasha Basu	Corporate
