= Shob Charitro Kalponik =

- Film poster
- Directed by: Rituparno Ghosh
- Written by: Rituparno Ghosh
- Produced by: Mahesh Ramanathan
- Starring: Prosenjit Chatterjee; Bipasha Basu; Jisshu Sengupta; Paoli Dam
- Cinematography: Soumik Haldar
- Edited by: Arghyakamal Mitra
- Music by: Raja Narayan Deb
- Distributed by: BIG Pictures
- Release date: 28 August 2009
- Country: India
- Language: Bengali

Shob Charitro Kalponik (transl. All Characters are Imaginary; also known as Afterword), is a 2009 Bengali film by Rituparno Ghosh starring Bipasha Basu, Prosenjit Chatterjee and Jisshu Sengupta. It was selected for the 30th Durban International Film Festival and won National Film Award for Best Feature Film in Bengali 2009. It was screened in the Marché du Film section of the 2009 Cannes Film Festival.

== Plot ==
Non-resident Bengali Radhika (Bipasha Basu) marries thespian poet Indranil Mitra (Prosenjit Chatterjee) to settle in Kolkata. While Indranil is immersed in the surreal world of words, rhythms, rhymes, and imaginations, Radhika single-handedly manages the private and public aspects of married life. Radhika gets wholesome support from their housemaid Priyobala Das (also called Nondor maa). While the apparently irresponsible and introverted Indranil carries out one selfish deed after other (like quitting his job after winning an award), Radhika stands like a rock to make the family financially sound.

All the reluctance and indifference from Indranil makes Radhika's heart gravitate towards Shekhar (Jisshu Sengupta), her colleague and Indranil's biggest admirer. Radhika becomes attracted to Shekhar but cannot abandon the unpredictability and histrionics of her spouse.

== Cast ==
- Prosenjit Chatterjee as Indranil Mitra
- Bipasha Basu as Radhika Mitra
- Jisshu Sengupta as Shekhar
- Paoli Dam as Kajori Roy
- Sohag Sen as Priyobala Das aka Nondor Maa

== Awards ==
Award	Category	Recipients	Result
Durban International Film Festival	Best Actress (Critics Choice)	Bipasha Basu	Won
National Film Awards, India	Best Feature Film in Bengali	Rituparno Ghosh	Won
