= Jism (2003 film) =

2003 film

- Theatrical release poster
- Directed by: Amit Saxena
- Written by: Mahesh Bhatt
- Dialogues by: Niranjan Iyengar
- Produced by: Pooja Bhatt; Sujit Kumar Singh
- Starring: Bipasha Basu; John Abraham; Gulshan Grover
- Cinematography: Fuwad Khan
- Edited by: Amit Saxena
- Music by: M. M. Keeravani
- Production companies: Fish Eye Network; Shreya Creations
- Distributed by: T-Series
- Release date: 17 January 2003
- Running time: 136 minutes
- Country: India
- Language: Hindi
- Box office: ₹13.41 crore

Jism (transl. Body) is a 2003 Indian Hindi-language erotic thriller film directed by Amit Saxena. The film stars Bipasha Basu, John Abraham in his acting debut, and Gulshan Grover. The music for the film was composed by M. M. Kreem.

The film is inspired by Body Heat (1981) by Lawrence Kasdan which was based on Billy Wilder's 1944 film Double Indemnity, an adaptation of James M. Cain's novel of the same name.

== Plot ==
A black jeep is seen careening toward a pier, with the driver struggling to maintain control and hold on to his life. The flashback is then revealed:

Kabir, an unhappy, rather poor alcoholic lawyer, lives a playboy lifestyle in Pondicherry. His best friends, Siddharth, a policeman, and Vishal, his colleague, try to keep him out of trouble. He meets Sonia Khanna, the beautiful wife of a traveling millionaire, Rohit Khanna.

They embark on a tumultuous affair, and Kabir finds himself falling madly in love with Sonia. He suggests that she get a divorce, but she warns him that her husband is capable of killing them both. Sonia ultimately convinces Kabir to murder her husband and make it look like an accident.

Not sensing Sonia's true intentions, Kabir agrees. According to Sonia's plan, Kabir must book a hotel room for an alibi, sneak out at night, kidnap Rohit while he sleeps, and take him to a warehouse where he will die in an explosion. Kabir procures a bomb from an explosives expert he had defended earlier. As planned, he enters Rohit and Sonia's villa at night. Sonia deliberately seduces Rohit to keep him awake. Kabir is unexpectedly spotted by Rohit, and a fight ensues. He manages to subdue Rohit and bring him to the dilapidated warehouse rigged with explosives. The building explodes, killing Rohit. Sonia then alters Rohit's will so that she inherits all his property. Kabir tries to reason with her, but she goes ahead and changes the will, naming him as executor.

Rohit's sister, Priyanka, already suspicious of the will and Rohit's mysterious death, tries to warn Kabir that Sonia is only interested in money and has already killed Rohit's first wife while serving as her nurse.

Surprised by this new information, Kabir confronts Sonia and urges her to give half of Rohit's wealth to Priyanka. However, Sonia is adamant and accuses Kabir of sleeping with Priyanka. Kabir warns Sonia that the police are closing in on them, as they believe Priyanka's suspicions. Siddharth, who is in charge of the case, is not convinced about Rohit's accidental death and suspects foul play, noting that Rohit's glasses, which he always wore, are nowhere to be found at the explosion site, and Rohit never left home without them. Siddharth also doubts Kabir's involvement and finds himself caught between friendship and duty.

Kabir tries to persuade Sonia to leave the city with him and waits for her. Sonia's car is seen arriving, but she attempts to run over Kabir in a bid to kill him. Kabir successfully dodges the attack, and the car ends up colliding and flipping over. The driver is revealed to be a handyman of Sonia and Rohit. Kabir then realizes that all Sonia wants is the money and that she has been trying to trap him all along to take the fall for Rohit's murder.

The car accident leaves the hitman dead. Kabir confronts Sonia and asks her if she ever loved him. Sonia denies ever loving him, claiming she has only loved herself. When he threatens to turn himself in and confess to the police, she warns him against such an action and shoots him. He is wounded in the abdomen but manages to stand. Sonia rushes to him as he stands and tells him that she has always loved him. They share a passionate kiss, and then the gun goes off in Sonia's hands. It is revealed that Kabir had shot Sonia in the stomach as he laid her down on the sofa.

He then flees and calls Siddharth, telling him and Vishal to meet him at the beach. They meet Kabir, who apologizes to them and says that he just wants to see the sunrise one last time. As they watch the sunrise, Kabir has a vision of Sonia walking toward him. Kabir smiles to himself and then dies from his injury.

== Cast ==
- Bipasha Basu as Sonia Khanna
- John Abraham as Advocate Kabir Lal
- Gulshan Grover as Rohit Khanna
- Vinay Pathak as DCP Siddharth
- Ranvir Shorey as Vishal Pathak
- Anahita Uberoi as Priyanka Kapoor
- Ayesha Kapur as Anushka Khanna
- Harsh Vashisht as Frankie, a bomb-maker
- Sheeba Chaddha as Sheeba

== Music ==
Jism

Soundtrack album by M. M. Keeravani
- Released: 1 December 2002
- Recorded: 2002
- Genre: Film soundtrack
- Length: 41:16
- Label: Saregama
- Producer: M. M. Keeravani

M. M. Keeravani chronology
Ee Abbai Chala Manchodu (2003)	Jism (2002)	Gangotri (2003)

The soundtrack of Jism was released on 1 December 2002. The music was composed by M. M. Keeravani under the pseudonym M. M. Kreem, with lyrics by Neelesh Misra and Sayeed Quadri. According to the Indian trade website Box Office India, around 1.5 million units of this soundtrack were sold.

Track-List
No.	Title	Lyrics	Artist(s)	Length
1.	"Jaadu Hai Nasha Hai" (Female Version)	Neelesh Misra	Shreya Ghoshal	5:29
2.	"Awarapan Banjarapan" (Version 1)	Sayeed Quadri	K.K.	7:01
3.	"Shikayat Hai"	Sayeed Quadri	Roop Kumar Rathod	6:47
4.	"Mere Khwabon Ka"	Sayeed Quadri	Udit Narayan	4:37
5.	"Chalo Tumko Lekar Chale" (Version 1)	Neelesh Misra	Shreya Ghoshal	4:48
6.	"Awarapan Banjarapan" (Version 2)	Sayeed Quadri	M. M. Keeravani	2:49
7.	"Jaadu Hai Nasha Hai" (Duet Version)	Neelesh Misra	Shreya Ghoshal, Shaan	5:28
8.	"Awarapan Banjarapan" (Version 3)	Sayeed Quadri	M. M. Keeravani	4:17
9.	"Chalo Tumko Lekar Chale" (Version 2)	Neelesh Misra	Shreya Ghoshal	2:57
Total length:				44:13

== Reception ==
=== Box office ===
Jism grossed ₹132.5 million (US$1.4 million) which Box Office India called a "hit".

=== Critical response ===
Taran Adarsh of Bollywood Hungama gave the film 2 out of 5 stars, writing "On the whole, JISM exhibits Bipasha Basu's talent and anatomy to its fullest. Coupled with a hot title and eroticism in plenty, the curiosity-value for the film increases manifold. But the subject and its treatment being city-centric, the film will appeal more to the big city audience. The reasonable price at which it is sold at should prove to be advantageous." Deepa Gumaste of Rediff.com wrote "Director Saxena makes a bold debut with Jism and definitely deserves credit for daring to be different. Jism is a first of its kind theme for Bollywood and, therefore, worth a look." India Today stated "Pooja Bhatt's film is not original, but it's good fun."

In 2011, Channel 4 ranked the film No. 92 for its Top 100 sexiest movie scenes poll. Bipasha Basu earned her popularity as the new sex symbol of commercial Hindi Cinema.

== Awards and nominations ==
Awards	Category	Recipient	Result
Filmfare Awards	Best Female Playback Singer	Shreya Ghoshal for "Jaadu Hai Nasha Hai"	Won
Filmfare Awards	Best Performance in a Negative Role	Bipasha Basu	Nominated
Filmfare Awards	Best Male Debut	John Abraham	Nominated
Bollywood Movie Awards	Best Villain	Bipasha Basu	Won
Bollywood Movie Awards	Best Male Debut	John Abraham	Won
Zee Cine Awards	Best Lyricist	Sayeed Quadri	Nominated
Zee Cine Awards	Best Playback Singer – Female	Shreya Ghoshal for "Jaadu Hai Nasha Hai"	Nominated
Screen Awards	Best Female Playback Singer	Shreya Ghoshal for "Jaadu Hai Nasha Hai"	Won
International Indian Film Academy Awards	Best Female Playback Singer	Shreya Ghoshal for "Jaadu Hai Nasha Hai"	Won
International Indian Film Academy Awards	Best Performance in a Negative Role	Bipasha Basu	Won

== Sequel ==
A sequel titled Jism 2, starring Sunny Leone, Randeep Hooda and Arunoday Singh, directed by Pooja Bhatt was released worldwide on 3 August 2012.
