= Force (film series) =

- Directed by: Nishikant Kamat; Abhinay Deo
- Written by: Ritesh Shah; Parveez Shaikh; Jasmeet K. Reen; Simaab Hashmi
- Produced by: Vipul Shah; John Abraham
- Starring: John Abraham; Genelia D'Souza; Vidyut Jammwal; Sonakshi Sinha; Tahir Raj Bhasin
- Cinematography: Ayananka Bose; Imre Juhasz; Mohana Krishna
- Edited by: Aarif Shaikh; Amitabh Shukla; Sanjay Sharma; Sumeet Kotian
- Music by: Harris Jayaraj; Gourov-Roshin; Amaal Mallik; Ravi Basrur
- Production companies: Sunshine Pictures; J.A. Entertainment; Karolina Corporation
- Distributed by: Fox Star Studios; Viacom 18 Motion Pictures; Panorama Studios; Yash Raj Films
- Release dates: 30 September 2011 (Force); 18 November 2016 (Force 2); 19 March 2027 (Force 3)
- Country: India
- Language: Hindi

Force is an Indian action thriller film series produced by Vipul Amrutlal Shah and John Abraham under the banners Sunshine Pictures and JA Entertainment. The series stars John Abraham in the lead role, with a supporting cast of Genelia D'Souza, Vidyut Jammwal, Sonakshi Sinha, and Tahir Raj Bhasin. The first film, Force (2011), directed by Nishikant Kamat, was released on 30 September 2011. It was followed by Force 2 (2016), directed by Abhinay Deo, which was released on 18 November 2016. A third installment, Force 3, directed by Bhav Dhulia, is currently in production.

== Overview ==
=== Force (2011) ===
ACP Yashvardhan "Yash" Singh (John Abraham) Yash, is in the hospital, recalling the accident that changed his life forever. Yash is a dutiful, responsible and stone-hearted police officer in the Narcotics Control Bureau whose only passion in life is crime-fighting. He has no family or loved ones and has been alone in life since he can remember. Everything changes when Yash meets Maya (Genelia D'Souza), an independent and lovely woman. Though the two get off to a rocky start, Maya warms up to him once she realises he is a police officer, and apologises for the misunderstandings they had. When Maya gets hit by a car in front of Yash, he rushes her to the hospital. The two bond and start to meet and go out regularly. Maya confesses her love to Yash, but Yash refutes her advances, as he does not want her to become his weakness in his professional life. However, Swati (Sandhya Mridul), the wife of Yash's coworker and good friend, convinces Yash that he is in love with Maya as well and Yash decides to marry her.

In the big drug case the unit is investigating, Yash, along with officers from the Narcotics Control Bureau, DSP Mahesh Pande (Ameet M Gaur) who is transferred on special duty from the New Delhi Income Tax Department, Inspector Atul Kalsekar (Mohnish Bahl) and Inspector Kamlesh, kills Reddy (Mukesh Rishi) while he is peddling drugs. Yash, Mahesh and Kamlesh are suspended for killing Reddy instead of arresting him. Reddy's heartless and aggressive brother Vishnu Shetty (Vidyut Jamwal) vows to avenge his brother's death by killing all of the officers. Yash and the other officers prepare themselves for Vishnu, but Vishnu successfully breaks into Mahesh's home and brutally murders him after raping his wife Rachana (Anaitha Nair). The event leaves Yash and the other officers shaken but Yash and Maya's marriage take place. Meanwhile, Vishnu decides to attack each of the officers' weaknesses; he kidnaps Swati, Atul's wife, and Atul is forced to tell him where Yash will be that night. Yash and Maya consummate their marriage; however, this proves to be their first and last night together.

Yash is shot and Maya is kidnapped in the attack. Yash miraculously survives the attack. Vishnu tells Atul that he will release Swati if Atul kills Yash. However, Atul cannot bring himself to kill his friend and instead joins forces with Yash to execute a plan against Vishnu and save Maya and Swati. Yash, Atul and Kamlesh all go to the place where Vishnu has been keeping Maya and Swati hostage and find, in horror, that Swati has been murdered. In despair and heartbreak, Atul kills himself after seeing Swati's body. Yash and Kamlesh go together and face Vishnu in a final confrontation. Kamlesh is shot but survives. Vishnu shoots Maya in front of Yash and drops her from the second floor. Yash catches her but is unable to save her. Maya assures Yash that she has gotten her wish of being with him and dies in Yash's arms. Anger and sorrow build up in Yash and he brutally finishes off Vishnu, exacting his revenge.

Yash is shown living alone again, having returned to his professional life. Kamlesh calls Yash and tells him that he has found a new informer. Yash turns to Maya's photo before leaving and says that he will be coming home late.

=== Force 2 (2016) ===
ACP Yashvardhan "Yash" Singh (John Abraham) is a no-nonsense police officer who has maintained his passion for crime fighting despite losing his wife, Maya (Genelia D'Souza) five years ago and suffering from hallucinations about her. He soon receives news of a murder of three R.A.W. agents, one of whom was his best friend Harish.

Yash suddenly receives a clue that Harish left before dying; the clue indicates that a spy is working in the Budapest embassy and is planning to destroy the R.A.W. team. Yash sends the information to the Intelligence Bureau director and R.A.W. head Anjan. Anjan suggests to Yash that he should team up with the Eastern European junior in-charge Sub Inspector Kamaljeet "KK" Kaur (Sonakshi Sinha) and go to Budapest. Yash and KK reach the safe house in Budapest but suddenly are struck by a blast. After escaping the attack, Yash tells her about the clue that someone from the Budapest embassy is leaking information and the location of R.A.W. agents.

Yash and KK shift to the hotel to find out more about embassy employees. She finds three suspects from database while he investigates alone with five employees who were included in database and they have party in club. Yash gets fourth suspect in whom he believes to be real culprit, as KK does not believe. The fourth suspect is revealed to be Shiv Sharma (Tahir Raj Bhasin), a mastermind terrorist who has a mission to destroy R.A.W. by providing locations and informations of R.A.W. agents to his Chinese spies. Yash and KK decides to lure anyone in glass art museum by giving fake mail for Chinese spy recruitment. Shiv decodes the location and reaches with first suspect. After some investigation KK realizes that Yash was right, Yash goes to Shiv's home to track him down but Shiv later runs away, KK tries to catch Shiv but gets knocked by him. They arrest Shiv after a chase and decides to bring him to India at any cost. In every attempt they have to fight Shiv's men. They have failed to save another R.A.W. agent in train station underground. In final attempt Shiv gets shot and gets rushed to the hospital. Yash later learns that Shiv is alive then gets taunted and hinted by him. Yash checks KK's watch and realizes that tracking chip was placed in it when she was knocked.

Yash and KK take help from club dancer Martinez, who is used to help her. He suspects Martinez that she might not help him but in order to get Shiv's location he accepts offer for having one night stand with her. After having location Yash and KK finds Shiv's hideout but in chase they have failed to catch Shiv. Shiv then shifts another location and kills two more R.A.W. agents. Yash's suspicion turns true when Martinez is revealed to be working for Shiv.

After having another location Yash goes to another Hideout to collect a clue, indicating the real birth date of Shiv. He learns from his colleague living in Mumbai that Shiv was dead ten years ago and realizes that it was his fake identity. Yash sends whole intelligence bureau team to orphanage at where Shiv was raised and learns that Shiv's real name is Rudra Pratap Singh, a son of former R.A.W. agent Karan Pratap Singh who has been working for R.A.W. from 30 years, he was disowned by Cabinet minister Brijesh Yadav and was killed, Rudra's mother has also committed suicide in this shock, at this process Yash realizes that Rudra wanted revenge not from R.A.W. but from Brijesh. Yash declines to go to Berlin when his suspicion is proven right and instead goes to the Indo-Hungarian summit meeting to hunt down Rudra.

In summit, KK is now able to shoot Brijesh but leaves him alive, Yash then defeats all Rudra's men. Rudra kills all men guarding Brijesh but gets stopped by KK before shooting Brijesh dead, Rudra tells his real identity to Brijesh and his plan to kill total 17 R.A.W. agents in Hong Kong. Yash confronts and shoots Rudra, Yash then forces Brijesh in the process to remove negative label from all R.A.W. agents and Rudra dies. Brijesh completes the work and gets interviewed. Maya's vision tells Yash that KK is his better love then her. This film ends with Yash and KK reunited together happily and watching Brijesh in news. This message shows unsung heroes or R.A.W. agents who died to save India.

=== Force 3 (2027) ===
The third installment in the series, Force 3 directed by Bhav Dhulia, stars John Abraham, Harshvardhan Rane, and Tanya Maniktala. It is produced by Sheel Kumar, Shahbaz Alam, John Abraham, Sandeep Leyzell and Minnakshi Das. It is written by Simaab Hashmi, music composed by Ravi Basrur, and the lyrics are by Irshad Kamil. As of April 2026, the first shooting schedule was completed, and the release is scheduled for 19 March 2027.

== Cast and characters ==
List indicators

This section includes characters who will appear or have appeared in more than two films in the series.

- An empty grey cell indicates the character was not in the film, or that the character's official presence has not yet been confirmed.
- ^{C} indicates a cameo role.
- ^{P} indicates an appearance in onscreen photographs.

Character	Film	
Character	Force	Force 2
A.C.P / D.C.P Yashvardhan "Yash" Singh	John Abraham	John Abraham
Maya	Genelia D'Souza	Genelia D'Souza^{c}
Vishnu Reddy	Vidyut Jammwal	
Mahesh Singh Rajput	Raj Babbar	Raj Babbar^{c}
Atul Kalsekar	Mohnish Bahl	
Sub Inspector / Inspector Kamaljeet "KK" Kaur		Sonakshi Sinha
Rudra Pratap Singh		Tahir Raj Bhasin
Anjan Das		Narendra Jha
Brijesh Verma		Adil Hussain
Harish Chaturvedi		Freddy Daruwala^{c}
Karan Pratap Singh		Boman Irani^{C}

== Crew ==
Occupation	Film	
Occupation	Force (2011)	Force 2 (2016)
Director	Nishikant Kamat	Abhinay Deo
Writer(s)	Ritesh Shah; Gautham Vasudev Menon	Parveez Sheikh; Jasmeet K. Reen
Producer(s)	Vipul Shah	Vipul Shah; John Abraham
Cinematography	Ayananka Bose	Imre Juhasz; Mohana Krishna
Editor(s)	Aarif Sheikh	Amitabh Shukla; Sanjay Sharma
Composer(s)	Harris Jayaraj	Gourov Roshin; Amaal Mallik
Background Score	Sameer Phaterpekar	Prasad Sathe
Production Company	Sunshine Pictures	Sunshina Pictures; JA Entertainment
Running Time	138 minutes	127 minutes
Release Date	30 September 2011	18 November 2016

== Release and revenue ==
Film	Release date	Budget	Box office revenue
Force	30 September 2011	₹28 crore (US$6 million)	₹40 crore (US$8.57 million)
Force 2	18 November 2016	₹41 crore (US$6.1 million)	₹58.8 crore (US$8.75 million)
Total		₹69 crore (US$7.2 million)	₹98.8 crore (US$10 million)

== Game ==
An official game based on Force 2 (2016) was launched after the release of the film by Hungama Digital Media.

== See also ==
- Kaakha Kaakha, a 2003 Tamil film, on which Force is based on.
