= John Abraham filmography =

John Abraham is an Indian actor, film producer, and former model who works in Hindi films. After a successful career as a model, Abraham began his acting career with the erotic-thriller Jism (2003), which was a box-office success. In the same year, he appeared in Anurag Basu's supernatural-thriller Saaya and Pooja Bhatt's crime-thriller Paap. The following year, he starred as the antagonist in the action-thriller Dhoom, directed by Sanjay Gadhvi and produced by Yash Raj Films, and the psychological-thriller Aetbaar, directed by Vikram Bhatt. Dhoom emerged as the third highest-grossing film of that year and earned him a nomination for the Filmfare Award for Best Performance in a Negative Role. In 2008, he starred alongside Abhishek Bachchan and Priyanka Chopra in the romantic comedy Dostana, his sole release that year. Dostana became a critical and commercial success, emerging as one of the highest-grossing Hindi films of 2008.

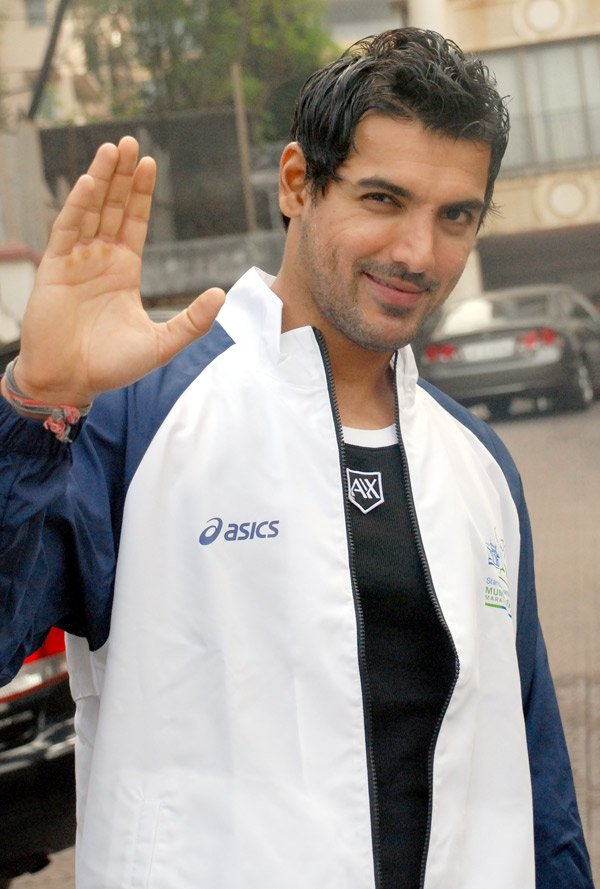
Abraham at an event in 2009

== Films ==
Year	Title	Role	Notes	Ref.
2003	Jism	Kabir Lal		
2003	Saaya	Aakash Bhatnagar		
2003	Paap	Shiven Verma		
2004	Aetbaar	Aryan Trivedi		
2004	Lakeer	Saahil Mishra		
2004	Dhoom	Kabir Sharma		
2004	Madhoshi	Aman Joshi		
2005	Elaan	Abhimanyu Singh		
2005	Karam	John Wargas		
2005	Kaal	Krish Thapar		
2005	Viruddh	Amar Patwardhan		
2005	Water	Narayan Dutt		
2005	Garam Masala	Shyam "Sam" Salgaonkar		
2006	Zinda	Rohit Chopra		
2006	Taxi No. 9211	Jai Mittal		
2006	Kabhi Alvida Naa Kehna	DJ	Cameo appearance	
2006	Baabul	Rajat Verma		
2006	Kabul Express	Suhel Khan		
2007	Salaam-e-Ishq	Ashutosh Raina		
2007	No Smoking	K		
2007	Dhan Dhana Dhan Goal	Sunny Bhasin		
2008	Dostana	Kunal Chauhan		
2009	New York	Sameer "Sam" Sheikh		
2010	Aashayein	Rahul Sharma		
2010	Jhootha Hi Sahi	Siddharth Arya (Fidato)		
2011	7 Khoon Maaf	Jamshed Singh Rathod (Jimmy Stetson)		
2011	Force	A.C.P Yashvardhan "Yash" Singh		
2011	Desi Boyz	Nikhil "Nick" Mathur		
2012	Housefull 2	Max Mehrotkar		
2012	Vicky Donor	Himself	Special appearance in the song "Rum Whisky"; Also producer	
2013	Race 2	Armaan Mallik		
2013	I, Me Aur Main	Ishaan Sabharwal		
2013	Shootout at Wadala	Manya Surve		
2013	Madras Cafe	Major Vikram Singh	Also producer	
2015	Welcome Back	Ajay Barsi (Ajju Bhai)		
2016	Wazir	SP Vijay Mallik	Cameo	
2016	Rocky Handsome	Kabir Ahlawat (Rocky Handsome)	Also producer; playback singer for the song "Alfazon Ki Tarah"	
2016	Dishoom	Kabir Shergill		
2016	Force 2	A.C.P Yashvardhan "Yash" Singh	Also producer	
2018	Parmanu	Ashwat Raina	Also producer	
2018	Satyameva Jayate	Virendra "Vir" Rathod		
2018	Savita Damodar Paranjpe	—N/a	Producer; Marathi film	
2019	Romeo Akbar Walter	Rehamatullah "Romeo" Ali / Akbar Malik / Walter Khan		
2019	Batla House	Sanjeev Kumar Yadav	Also producer	
2019	Pagalpanti	Raj Kishore		
2021	Mumbai Saga	Amartya Rao Naik		
2021	Sardar Ka Grandson	Gursher Singh	Also producer; cameo appearance	
2021	Satyameva Jayate 2	Activist Dadasaheb Balram Azad, Home Minister Satya Balram Azad & A.C.P Jay Balram Azad (Note: John Abraham plays in a triple role films.)	Triple role	
2022	Attack	Major Arjun Shergill	Also screenwriter and producer	
2022	Ek Villain Returns	Bhairav Purohit		
2022	Mike	—N/a	Producer; Malayalam film	
2022	Tara vs Bilal	—N/a	Producer	
2023	Pathaan	Jim		
2024	Woh Bhi Din The	Rahul Sinha	Also producer; Cameo appearance	
2024	Vedaa	Major Abhimanyu Kanwar	Also producer	
2025	The Diplomat	J.P. Singh	Also producer	
2025	Tehran	ACP Rajeev Kumar		
2027	Force 3 †	ACP Yashvardhan Singh	Also producer	
2027	Untitled Rakesh Maria Biopic film †	Rakesh Maria		

== Music videos ==
Year	Title	Performer	Language	Ref.
1999	"Mahek"	Pankaj Udhas	Hindi	
2001	"Teri Jhanjhar Kisne Banayi"	Hans Raj Hans	Punjabi	
2002	"Husna Di Sarkar"	Jazzy B	Punjabi	
2008	"Koi Aanay Wala Hai"	Strings	Urdu	
2013	"Betiyaan (Save the Girl Child)"	Shankar Mahadevan, Sunidhi Chauhan, Sonu Nigam	Hindi	

== See also ==
- List of awards and nominations received by John Abraham
