= Sameer Phaterpekar =

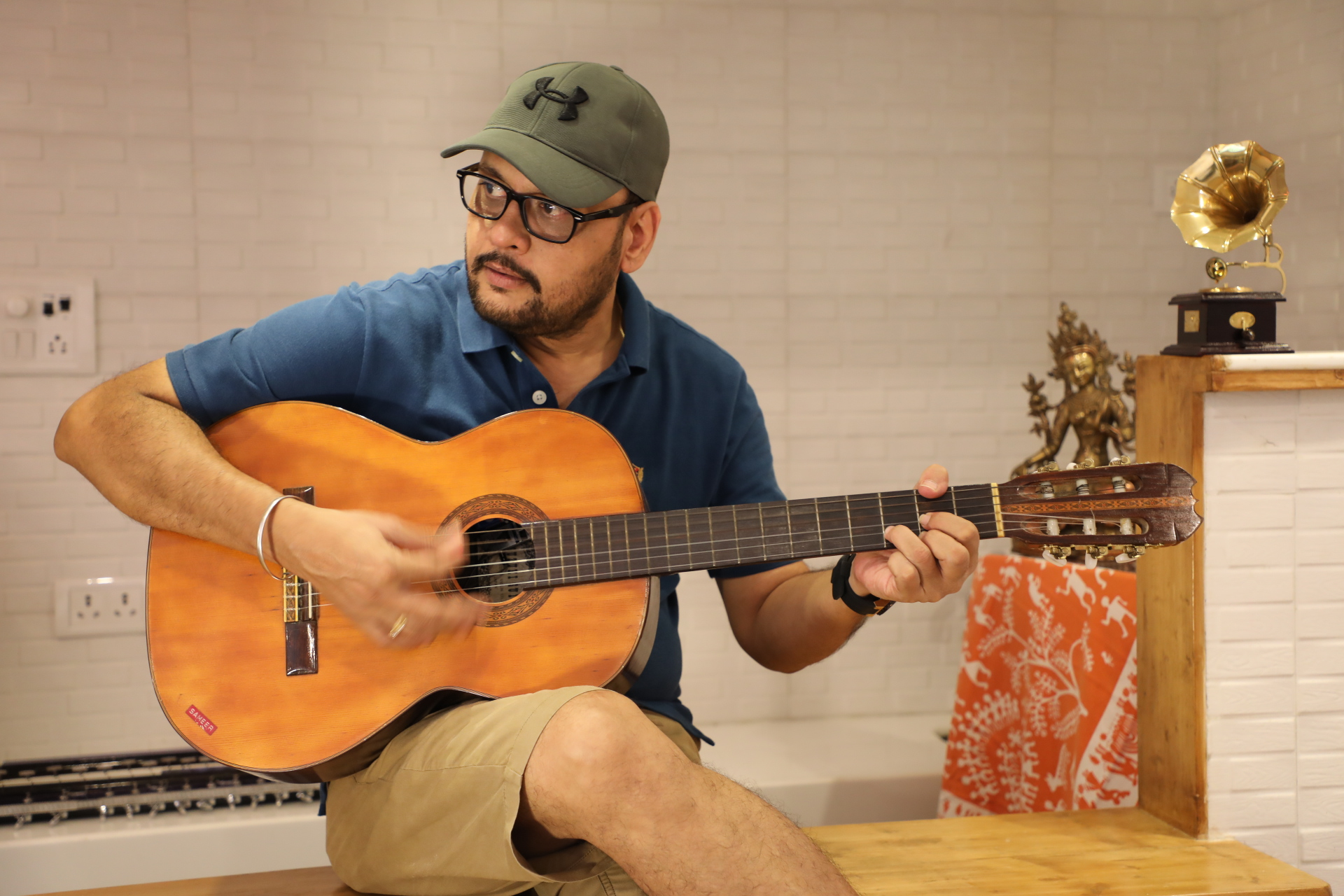
- Sameer Phaterpekar

Background information
- Origin: Mumbai, Maharashtra, India
- Genres: Film score, soundtrack
- Occupations: Music director, composer, record producer, instrumentalist, arranger, programmer
- Years active: 1983–present

Sameer Phaterpekar is an Indian score composer known for his work in Hindi films.

== Life and early career ==
Sameer Phaterpekar began working in films as a musician in 1983. He has worked with composers such as R.D.Burman, Kalyanji-Anandji, Rajesh Roshan and Laxmikant–Pyarelal. While working under the duo, he most notably worked as a guitarist for the song ''Hawa Hawaii'' for the film Mr. India (1987). In 2002, Phaterperkar began working as an independent music composer along with lyricist Anand Bakshi and composed his first album ''Khoobsurat'' under the label Venus Records & Tapes. He has provided scores for Hindi, Marathi and Tamil films. He scored the 2005 film Dombivli Fast, which won the National Film Award for Best Feature Film. He has also been widely associated with director Nishikant Kamat, having provided scores for his films, Evano Oruvan (2007), Mumbai Meri Jaan (2008), Force (2011) and Drishyam (2015) and Madaari (2016). His scores for these films earned him critical acclaim.

== Filmography ==
=== As Background Score Composer ===
- Dombivli Fast (2005)
- My Friend Ganesha (2007)
- Evano Oruvan (2007) - Tamil film
- Mumbai Meri Jaan (2008)
- Riwayat (2010)
- Force (2011)
- Adaalat (2013–2014) - TV Series
- Lai Bhaari (2014)
- Drishyam (2015)
- Madaari (2016)
- Aapla Manus (2018)
- Criminal Justice (2019–present) - Web Series
- Out of Love (2019–2021) - Web Series
- Sutliyan (2022) - Web Series
- Criminal Justice: Adhura Sach (2022) - TV Series
- Rafuchakkar (2023) - TV Series
