= List of awards and nominations received by John Abraham =

John Abraham awards and nominations
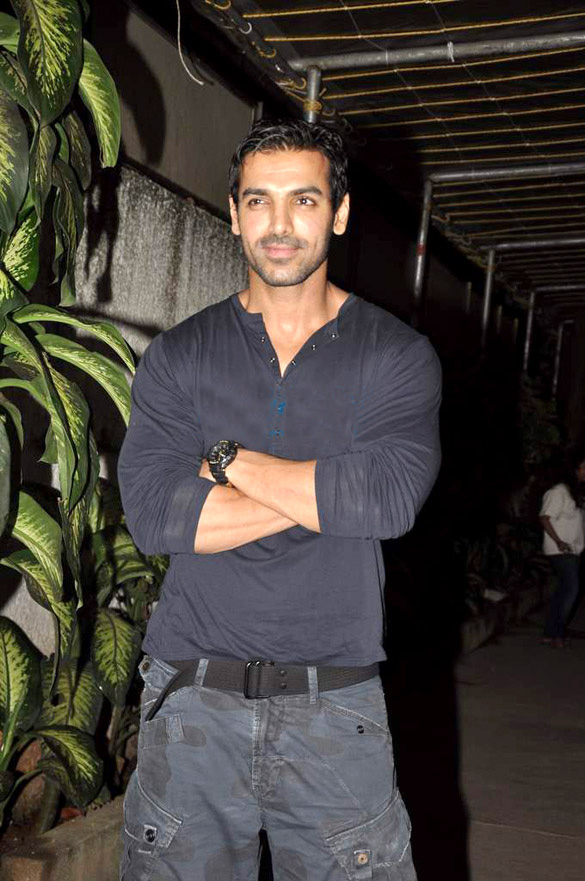
- Abraham in 2013
Awards and nominations
Award	Wins	Nominations
BIG Star Entertainment Awards	0	5
Filmfare Awards	0	4
Screen Awards	2	7
Zee Cine Awards	1	2
Stardust Awards	1	4
IIFA Awards	2	2
Others	5	8

Totals (Note: Certain award groups do not simply award one winner. They acknowledge several different recipients, have runners-up, and have third place. Since this is a specific recognition and is different from losing an award, runner-up mentions are considered wins in this award tally. For simplification and to avoid errors, each award in this list has been presumed to have had a prior nomination.)
- Wins: 11
- Nominations: 29

The following is a list of awards and nominations received by Indian actor and producer John Abraham.

== Awards and nominations ==
In 2025, John Abraham with his NorthEast United FC team honored at Rashtrapati Bhavan by the hands of President of India Droupadi Murmu.

Year	Nominated work	Award	Category	Result	Ref.
2004	Jism	49th Filmfare Awards	Best Male Debut	Nominated	
2004	Jism	5th IIFA Awards	Star Debut of the Year – Male	Won	
2004	Jism	Bollywood Movie Awards	Best Male Debut	Won	
2004	Jism	Screen Awards	Most Promising Newcomer – Male	Won	
2004	Jism	Sansui Viewers' Choice Movie Awards	Most Promising Debut Actor	Nominated	
2004	Jism	Stardust Awards	Superstar of Tomorrow – Male	Nominated	
2004	Paap	Stardust Awards	Superstar of Tomorrow – Male	Won	
2005	Dhoom	50th Filmfare Awards	Best Villain	Nominated	
2005	Dhoom	6th IIFA Awards	Best Villain	Won	
2005	Dhoom	8th Zee Cine Awards	Best Villain	Won	
2005	Dhoom	Global Indian Film Awards	Best Villain	Nominated	
2006	Garam Masala	7th IIFA Awards	Best Supporting Actor	Nominated	
2006	Garam Masala	Screen Awards	Best Supporting Actor	Nominated	
2006	Garam Masala	People's Choice Awards India	Favourite Comedy Movie Star	Nominated	
2007	Baabul	52nd Filmfare Awards	Best Supporting Actor	Nominated	
2007	Baabul	Bollywood Movie Awards	Best Supporting Actor	Nominated	
2007	Zinda	10th Zee Cine Awards	Best Villain	Nominated	
2007	Zinda	8th IIFA Awards	Best Villain	Nominated	
2009	Dostana	Screen Awards	Jodi No. 1 (Note: Shared with Abhishek Bachchan)	Won	
2009	Dostana	People's Choice Awards India	Favourite Comedy Movie Star	Nominated	
2009	Dostana	Stardust Awards	Star of the Year - Male	Nominated	
2010	New York	Screen Awards	Best Actor (Popular)	Nominated	
2012	Desi Boyz	Screen Awards	Best Actor (Popular)	Nominated	
2012	Force	Screen Awards	Best Actor (Popular)	Nominated	
2012	Force	People's Choice Awards India	Favourite Action Movie Star	Nominated	
2012	Force	Stardust Awards	Best Actor in a Thriller or Action	Nominated	
2012	—N/a	13th Zee Cine Awards	Male International Icon	Nominated	
2013	Housefull 2	Stardust Awards	Best Actor in a Comedy or Romance	Nominated	
2013	Housefull 2	People's Choice Awards India	Favourite Ensemble Cast	Won	
2013	—N/a	South African Film and Television Awards	Best Youth Icon	Won	
2013	Vicky Donor	60th National Film Awards	Best Popular Film Providing Wholesome Entertainment	Won	
2013	Vicky Donor	58th Filmfare Awards	Best Film	Nominated	
2014	Race 2	Screen Awards	Best Actor (Popular)	Nominated	
2014	Shootout at Wadala	Screen Awards	Best Actor (Popular)	Nominated	
2014	Madras Cafe	Screen Awards	Best Actor (Popular)	Nominated	
2014	Madras Cafe	Screen Awards	Best Film	Nominated	
2014	Madras Cafe	Asiavision Awards	Icon of the Year	Won	
2014	Madras Cafe	BIG Star Entertainment Awards	Most Entertaining Actor in a Social Drama Film – Male	Nominated	
2014	Madras Cafe	BIG Star Entertainment Awards	Most Entertaining Actor in a Thriller Film – Male	Nominated	
2016	Welcome Back	Screen Awards	Best Ensemble Cast	Nominated	
2016	Force 2	BIG Star Entertainment Awards	Most Entertaining Actor in an Action Film	Nominated	
2023	—N/a	Bollywood Hungama Style Icons	Most Stylish Charismatic Legend	Nominated	
2024	Pathaan	Zee Cine Awards	Best Performance in a Negative Role	Nominated	
2024	Pathaan	Pinkvilla Screen and Style Icons Awards	Best Actor in a Negative Role	Nominated	

== See also ==
- John Abraham filmography
