= Amit Pawar =

Indian film editor

- Born: 11 September 1972; Mumbai, Maharashtra, India
- Died: 20 February 2010 (aged 37); Mumbai, Maharashtra, India
- Occupation: Film editor

Amit Pawar was an Indian film editor, most known for the films, Main Madhuri Dixit Banna Chahti Hoon, Dombivali Fast, and Mumbai Meri Jaan. He won the Filmfare Award for Best Editing for Mumbai Meri Jaan in 2009.

== Filmography ==
- 2003 - Main Madhuri Dixit Banna Chahti Hoon (Hindi)
- 2004 - Supari Marathi
- 2005 - Dombivali Fast (Marathi)
- 2005 - Yanda Kartavya Aahe (Marathi)
- 2006 - Majha Navra Tujhi Bayako
- 2007 - Evano Oruvan (Tamil)
- 2007 - Saade Maade Teen (Marathi)
- 2008 - Mumbai Meri Jaan (Hindi)
- 2009 - Hangama (Marathi)
- 2009 - Harishchandrachi Factory (Marathi)
- 2010 - Ringa Ringa (Marathi)
- 2010 - Kshanbhar Vishranti Amit Pawar
