= Force (2011 film) =

2011 Indian film by Nishikant Kamat

- Theatrical release poster
- Directed by: Nishikant Kamat
- Written by: Ritesh Shah
- Story by: Gautham Vasudev Menon
- Based on: Kaakha Kaakha (Tamil)(2003)
- Produced by: Vipul Shah
- Starring: John Abraham; Genelia D'Souza; Vidyut Jammwal
- Cinematography: Ayananka Bose
- Edited by: Aarif Sheikh
- Music by: Songs: Harris Jayaraj; Background Score: Sameer Phaterpekar
- Production company: Sunshine Pictures
- Distributed by: Fox Star Studios
- Release date: 30 September 2011
- Running time: 138 minutes
- Country: India
- Language: Hindi
- Budget: ₹28 crore
- Box office: ₹40 crore

Force is a 2011 Indian Hindi-language romantic action thriller film directed by Nishikant Kamat, written by Ritesh Shah and produced by Vipul Amrutlal Shah. It is a remake of 2003 Tamil film Kaakha Kaakha (2003). The film stars John Abraham, alongside Genelia D'Souza, Vidyut Jammwal, Raj Babbar, Mukesh Rishi and Mohnish Bahl. The songs were predominantly composed by Harris Jayaraj while Lalit Pandit served as a guest composer with one song. The background score was composed by Sameer Phaterpekar. The cinematography and editing were handled by Ayananka Bose and Aarif Sheikh, respectively.

Force was released on 30 September 2011 and received positive reviews from critics. A sequel titled Force 2 was released in 2016, making it the first installment of the Force film series.

== Plot ==
Assistant Commissioner of Police Officer Yashvardhan "Yash" Singh is a responsible and stone-hearted officer in the NCB. He has no family or loved ones and has been alone in life. Yash meets Maya, an independent woman. Though the two get off to a rocky start, Maya warms up to him after she finds out about his profession. When Maya meets with an accident, Yash rushes her to the hospital and the two bond and start to meet regularly. Maya confesses her love to Yash, but Yash refuses, telling her that he does not want her to become his weakness in his professional life.

However, Swati, the wife of Yash's co-worker and friend Inspector Atul Kalsekar, convinces Yash that he is in love with Maya as well. Yash decides to accept her love. In the case being investigated by the unit, Yash, along with DSP Mahesh Pandey, who is transferred on special duty from the New Delhi Income Tax Department, and Inspector Kamlesh Sawant, kill Vijay Reddy, a drug baron. Yash, Mahesh, Kamlesh and Atul are suspended for killing Reddy instead of arresting him. Vishnu Reddy, Reddy's heartless and aggressive brother, vows to avenge his brother's death by killing all the officers.

Yash and the other officers prepare themselves for Vishnu, but Vishnu and his henchmen successfully break into Mahesh's home and brutally murder him and rape & murder his wife Rachana. The event affects Yash and the other officers, but Yash and Maya's marriage takes place. Vishnu attacks each of the officers' weaknesses, where he kidnaps Swati and forces Atul to reveal Yash's whereabouts. Yash and Maya spend time with each other until Vishnu arrives and shoots Yash, leaving him for dead while kidnapping Maya. Yash barely survives and is admitted to the hospital. Vishnu instructs Atul to kill Yash in return for Swati's release.

However, Atul cannot bring himself to kill Yash and instead joins forces with Yash to save Swati and Maya. When Yash and Atul find Swati dead, Atul kills himself, while Yash and Kamlesh face Vishnu in a final confrontation. Vishnu shoots Maya and she dies in Yash's arms. Enraged, Yash brutally finishes off Vishnu, exacting his vengeance. In the aftermath, Yash returns to his professional life, while remembering his moments with Maya with Kamlesh who's on the phone with him, surviving the attack from Vishnu.

== Cast ==
- John Abraham as ACP Yashvardhan ″Yash″ Singh IPS
- Genelia D'Souza as Maya, Yash's wife
- Vidyut Jammwal as Vishnu Reddy
- Raj Babbar as Mahesh Singh Rajput IRS; Zonal director of NCB, Mumbai
- Mohnish Bahl as Inspector Atul Kalsekar, Swati's husband and Yash's teammate
- Kiran Karmarkar as Tahir Mirza
- Mukesh Rishi as Vijay 'Anna' Reddy, Vishnu's brother
- Kamlesh Sawant as Inspector Kamlesh Sawant, Yash's teammate
- Sandhya Mridul as Swati Kalsekar, Atul's wife
- Anaitha Nair as Rachana, Mahesh's girlfriend
- Saksham Dayma as Bala, Vishnu's right-hand man
- Ninad Kamat as Vasu, Vishnu's right-hand man
- Ameet M. Gaur as Mahesh Pandey, Yash's teammate
- Shashank Shende as Arvind
- Parineeta Borthakur as Maya's sister

== Production ==
=== Development ===
In July 2004, Gautham Vasudev Menon agreed to direct a version of Kaakha Kaakha in Hindi with Sunny Deol in the lead role and revealed that the script was written five years ago with Deol in mind, but the film eventually failed to take off. Producer Vipul Shah approached him to direct the Hindi version of the film in 2010 as Force with John Abraham and Katrina Kaif. Menon initially agreed before pulling out again, citing that he felt the eight years gap between the releases of it with the original was too long. Nishikant Kamat of Evano Oruvan and Mumbai Meri Jaan fame, was roped in by the producers to direct the remake. Asin was initially signed to reprise her role that she played in the Telugu remake Gharshana, but she is forced to withdraw from the film due to delay of filming and also her film dates clashed with her other film Ready. She was later consequently replaced by Genelia D'Souza. Vidyut Jammwal, a model turned actor, was cast as the antagonist who had reportedly won the role from 500 other people who were originally considered. Jamwal had to undergo strenuous training to build a body that could be comparable to the hero of the film.

=== Filming ===
The shooting of the film ended in February 2011 after 65 days of shooting. During the filming, John Abraham stated that "With Nishikant I have discovered the magic of raw action, but what is even more beautiful is the romance in 'Force'. This I believe will be my first pan-india film after a long gap." The film involved tough stunts choreographed by Allan Amin, who worked with John Abraham earlier in Dhoom (2004).

== Soundtrack ==
Force

Soundtrack album by Harris Jayaraj
- Released: 29 August 2011
- Recorded: 2010–2011
- Genre: Feature film soundtrack
- Length: 26:00
- Language: Hindi
- Label: T-Series
- Producer: Harris Jayaraj

Harris Jayaraj chronology
| Ko (2011) | Force (2011) | 7 aum Arivu (2011) |

The soundtrack is composed by Harris Jayaraj, which is his second album in Hindi after his successful album Rehnaa Hai Terre Dil Mein (2001). "Khwabon Khwabon" was reused from the song "Uyirin Uyire" in the original film Kaakha Kaakha, and "Main Chali" was reused from the song "Manasa" in Munna and “Mudhal Mazhai” from Bheemaa, half of each. The lyrics were penned by Javed Akhtar. The track "Dum Hai Toh Aaja" was composed by Lalit Pandit. Sameer Phaterpekar composed the film's Background Score. The soundtrack album featuring five tracks was released by T-Series on 29 August 2011.

=== Track listing ===
All lyrics are written by Javed Akhtar.

| No. | Title | Music | Singer(s) | Length |
|---|---|---|---|---|
| 1. | "Khwabon Khwabon" | Harris Jayaraj | KK, Suchitra Kumar, Jaspreet Jasz | 5:21 |
| 2. | "Chahoon Bhi" | Harris Jayaraj | Karthik, Bombay Jayashri, Neeraj Sridhar | 4:54 |
| 3. | "Dum Hai Toh Aaja" | Lalit Pandit | Mahua Kamat | 5:05 |
| 4. | "Main Chali" | Harris Jayaraj | Naresh Iyer, Shreya Ghoshal, Suzanne D'Mello | 5:11 |
| 5. | "Dil Ki Hai Tamanna" | Harris Jayaraj | Vijay Prakash, Shalini Singh, Neha Bhasin | 5:32 |
| Total length: | | | | 26:00 |

=== Reception ===
Professional ratings
Review scores
| Source | Rating |
|---|---|
| Bollywood Hungama | 3/5 stars |
| Planet Bollywood | 7/10 stars |
| Filmfare | 3/5 stars |

Joginder Tuteja of Bollywood Hungama gave 3/5 stars and said, "Force delivers as promised and turns out to be an impressive soundtrack. While 'Khwabon Khwabon' was anyway expected to be the USP of the soundtrack, 'Main Chali' turns out to be another number that works quite well for the soundtrack. Overall, an album that has a potential to turn much bigger if the film too turns out to be a good success." Tanuj Manchanda of Planet Bollywood gave 7/10 and quoted in his review that "After hearing all songs, one can say that this is undoubtedly one of the best albums of the year both in terms of lyrics and compositions. Harris Jayaraj has proved his mettle time and again and this time also he succeeds with flying colours. Javed akhtar as usual is dedicated towards giving his best. And the best part of the album is that all songs except 'Dum Hai To Aaja' are soulful and a treat for all music lovers and does not have any remixes to rob off the impact. Force is definitely recommended!" Devesh Sharma at Filmfare awarded it 3/5 stars and quoted "Overall, Jayraj has arrived on the Hindi music scene and one looks forward to hearing more of his original tunes (and not reprises) in future." Komal Nahta of Koimoi stated that, "the songs have not become as popular as they are nice. Javed Akhtar's lyrics are appropriate."

== Release ==
Force was released on 30 September 2011. The film marks John Abraham's biggest opening for a release up-to date.

=== Critical response ===
Taran Adarsh of Bollywood Hungama gave 4/5 stars and wrote "Force is an engrossing story of vendetta and the execution of the material makes it stand out in the crowd. The film has the requisite amount of zing and force, so essential for action movies that talk of heroism. If you are looking for a sensible masala film with substance, Force should most definitely figure on your agenda." The Times of India gave 3.5/5 stars and wrote "Force is a heady cocktail of high powered action and breezy romance that ensure there's never a dull moment". Aakanksha Naval-Shetye of DNA India rated 3/5 stars and said "The best part of the film are its action sequences which are well thought out, however, it has a fairly predictable story line". Hamara Bollywood gave 3/5 stars and wrote "In the category of action movies, Force just might be the best one of the year as it doesn’t fail to deliver on the action, it also finds time to include romance and a slight hint of comedy". Deccan Chronicle gave 2.5/5 stars and wrote "Force doesn't live up to its title...at all". Komal Nahta of Koimoi gave 2.5/5 stars and wrote "On the whole, Force will be liked by the youngsters, especially guys. In the final tally, it will prove to be an above-average fare, thanks to the impressive start all over". Mayank Shekhar of Hindustan Times gave 2/5 stars and concluded "Force is hardly a force to reckon with".

=== Box office ===
Upon release, Force opened to decent start at the domestic box office and packed cinema halls, "witnessing 100% occupancy across shows", according to Box Office India. The film grossed ₹48.4 million (US$520,000) in India on the first day. Force has fared well, despite number of screens and shows being limited. It collected approx ₹245.2 millionnett in 1st week. Force is John's biggest opener, in solo lead. The film dropped on Monday but then held steady collections through the weekdays but the collections were low. Force fell heavily in its second weekend taking an 85% fall from its first, it collected ₹20 million nett to ₹235.0 million nett in 10 days. The film had a poor opening of around $500,000 in overseas. The opening figures from United Kingdom were £65,000, North America $100,000, UAE $160,000 and Australia $60,000. The film collected ₹347.2 million in India and was declared as "above average".

== Sequel ==
Producer Vipul Shah planned a sequel to the film titled Force 2. The film was directed by Abhinay Deo and Sonakshi Sinha played a RAW agent in the sequel.
