= Upendra Sidhaye =

Indian screenwriter

Upendra Sidhaye (born 8 October 1980), born and brought up in Pune, is a screenplay and story writer in Indian Film industry (Bollywood). Sidhaye won honors and admiration with his debut film Mumbai Meri Jaan (2008). Sidhaye and Yogesh Vinayak Joshi collectively received the Filmfare Awards (2009) and Cine Blitz award of best screenplay for Mumbai Meri Jaan.

== Education ==
Sidhaye graduated with a degree in commerce. He did his post graduation in Mass Communication from Pune University. He joined theatre group viz. Maitree, Pune that staged Marathi plays like Sankraman. In conjunction, He also participated in a prestigious trophy named Purushottam Karandak to direct and act in a Marathi play viz. Enigma. This play won the team a silver cup and Sidhaye received award for best direction and acting.

== Career ==
Sidhaye wrote and directed the short films 3 Khwaab and Waiting Room. Following this, he worked as an in-house writer for UTV Motion Pictures starting 2005 and, with Yogesh Vinayak Joshi, co-wrote Nishikant Kamat's Mumbai Meri Jaan and was also an assistant director for the film. He was a writer for the Bollywood film Payback (2010).

Sidhaye has written the Hindi adaptation of Drishyam, as well as dialogues for the award-winning Marathi film Killa. He made his directorial debut with the Marathi film Girlfriend. Most recently, he worked on the feature film Me Vasantrao, which he has co-written with director Nipun Dharmadhikari, which released in April 2022 to wide critical and commercial acclaim.
