= Bombay Rockers =

Danish-Indian band

- Origin: Denmark
- Genres: Pop; hip hop; rock; Bhangra
- Years active: 2003–present
- Labels: Times Music; Discowax
- Members: Navtej Singh Rehal; Thomas Sardorf
- Website: bombayrockers.com

Bombay Rockers is a Danish musical duo popular in India. Their debut album, Introducing, has gone five times Platinum, with sales of over 100,000 records.

== History ==
In 2003, Danish-Indian singer Navtej Singh Rehal (Naf) was introduced to the production duo known as WCA, which consisted of Thomas Sardorf and Janus Barnewitz. They jammed together and eventually formed the band Bombay Rockers, with Naf providing Punjabi and Hindi vocals and Sardorf singing in English. Barnewitz worked with the duo on production as well as initially managing the band.

Their first collaboration, "Ari Ari", got significant airplay in Denmark. In July 2003, Bombay Rockers went onstage with the EDM duo Filur at Roskilde Festival, in front of roughly 25,000 people.

"Sexy Mama", released in late 2003, was the first single from their debut album, Introducing; the track received airplay all over Denmark. The trio's next single, "Rock tha Party", became another major radio hit. It was featured in the 2016 action film Rocky Handsome. Introducing came out in 2005.

The group's second album, Crash and Burn, was released in 2007. Their third, Rock and Dhol, came out in 2011. It received positive reviews, and the singles "Lets Dance", "Nava Nava", and "Ishq" proved popular not only in Denmark but also in India and Pakistan.

== Discography ==
=== Studio albums ===
- Introducing... (2005)
- Crash and Burn (2007)
- Rock and Dhol (2011)

=== Remix albums ===
- Rock tha Party (2004)

=== Singles ===
- "Sexy Mama" (2003)
- "Wild Rose" (2005)
- "Out of Control" (2006)
- "Kushi" (2007)
- "Beautiful" (2007)
- "Let's Dance" (2011)

=== Soundtrack appearances ===
Year	Film	Song	Music	Lyrics	Co-artist(s)	Ref.
2016	Rocky Handsome	"Rock tha Party"	Bombay Rockers	Kumaar, Bombay Rockers		
2019	Satellite Shankar	"Aari Aari"	Tanishk Bagchi	Kumaar	Romy	
2026	Dhurandhar: The Revenge	"Aari Aari"	Shashwat Sachdev	Irshad Kamil, Bombay Rockers, Reble, Token	Khaan Saab, Jasmine Sandlas, Sudhir Yaduvanshi, Reble, Token	
