= Teddy Maurya =

Polymath artist

Ajay Maurya, popularly known by his industry name Teddy Maurya, is an Indian film and theatre actor, director, writer, musician, production designer and art director.

== Early life ==
Maurya, the brother of writer and actor Vijay Maurya, was born and raised in Mumbai, Maharashtra.

== Career ==
=== Theatre ===
Teddy began his career with the prominent theatre group Ansh in 1993. He has designed more than 40 productions for Ansh since. He has also acted, designed costumes, lights and musical soundscapes for theatre.

His directorial debut in theatre began with the play Ashwa Vishwa.

=== Film ===
He first appeared in a small role as a minion of the principal antagonist "Bachhu Yadav" in the 1999 hit film Shool. Thereafter, he worked as production designer with the Marathi movie Pak Pak Pakaak in 2005, for which he received the Maharashtra State Government Award for Art.

As production designer, Teddy has gone on to work on several acclaimed films such as Jab We Met, Love Aaj Kal, Chalo Dilli and Bajate Raho. He has also created set designs for many popular Bollywood song sequences.

Teddy Maurya began acting in films when director Imtiaz Ali offered him a small but iconic role as a sleazy guest house receptionist in Jab We Met. Since then he has acted in several films, especially with critic-favourite directors like Imtiaz Ali and Anurag Kashyap.

His largest role in films till date was in the action flick Rocky Handsome as a devilish villain.

=== Commercials ===
Teddy has worked extensively as production designer for commercials. His clients include powerhouses like Coca-Cola, American Tourister, Reliance, Amul, Mahindra and many more.

== Filmography ==
=== As actor ===
- Shool (1999, Bachu Yadav's Henchman)
- Jab We Met (2007, Hotel Receptionist and Policeman at Railway Station)
- Black Friday (2007, Sugarcane Juice Vendor)
- Gulaal (2009, Bahrupiya/Ardhnareshwar)
- Love Aaj Kal (2009, Taxi Driver)
- Chalo Dilli (2011, Bhaiyaji/Shrivastava Ji)
- Rockstar (2011, Music Arranger)
- Bajatey Raho (2013, Swami)
- Tamasha (2015, as Servant)
- Rocky Handsome (2016, as Luke Ferreira)
- Ek Ladki Ko Dekha Toh Aisa Laga as Theater Play Director

=== As Production Designer ===
- Pak Pak Pakaak (2005)
- Jab We Met (2007)
- Love Aaj Kal (2009)
- Chalo Dilli (2011)
- Bajatey Raho (2013)

=== As Set Designer for Song Sequences ===
- Vicky Donor (2012, 'Rum Whiskey')
- Udta Punjab (2016, 'Udta Punjab', 'Ek Kudi')
- Dangal (2016, 'Dhakad Hai')
- Phata Poster Nikhla Hero (2013, 'Tu Mere Agal Bagal Hai')
