= Game (2011 film) =

2011 Indian film by Abhinay Deo

- Theatrical release poster
- Directed by: Abhinay Deo
- Written by: Althea Delmas Kaushal
- Dialogues by: Farhan Akhtar
- Produced by: Ritesh Sidhwani; Farhan Akhtar
- Starring: Abhishek Bachchan; Kangana Ranaut; Gauhar Khan; Jimmy Shergill; Boman Irani; Anupam Kher
- Cinematography: Kartik Vijay
- Edited by: Amitabh Shukla
- Music by: Songs: Shankar–Ehsaan–Loy; Ram Sampath; Score: Ram Sampath
- Production company: Excel Entertainment
- Distributed by: Eros International
- Release date: 1 April 2011
- Running time: 136 minutes
- Country: India
- Language: Hindi
- Budget: ₹24 crore
- Box office: ₹12.87 crore

Game is a 2011 Indian Hindi-language action thriller film directed by Abhinay Deo and produced by Farhan Akhtar and Ritesh Sidhwani under Excel Entertainment. It stars Abhishek Bachchan, Kangana Ranaut, Gauahar Khan, Jimmy Sheirgill, Boman Irani, Anupam Kher, Shahana Goswami, and Sarah-Jane Dias. The film was shot in Mumbai, Samos Island in Greece, Istanbul, London, and Bangkok. It was released on 1 April 2011.

== Plot ==
Kabir Malhotra (Anupam Kher) is a billionaire tycoon who invites four people to his island home in Greece by sending a different letter to each. The four people, who have never met before, are Neil Menon (Abhishek Bachchan), a casino owner in Turkey who has financial problems with mob bosses that Kabir offers to help with, Vikram Kapoor (Jimmy Sheirgill), an actor in India, who suffers with drug, cancer, and career problems; Kabir writes to him that he wants to finance the biggest film ever made, and offers Vikram a role in it, Om Prakash "OP" Ramsay (Boman Irani), a political leader and prime ministerial candidate in Thailand whose campaign is under threat of scandal; Kabir offers to provide new funding to him, and Tisha Khanna (Shahana Goswami), a crime journalist in the United Kingdom who is looking for her big break; Kabir writes to her that he has a huge story and invites her to cover it.

The four guests arrive on the island, where they are greeted by Kabir's executive assistant, Samara Shroff (Gauahar Khan), who takes them into a dining room that is being secretly filmed. There, Kabir reveals that he has invited them because of their link to his daughter, Maya (Sarah-Jane Dias), whom Kabir has spent years trying to find. Maya was trafficked as a child by OP Ramsay, as an adult brought into the crime world by Neil Menon, and in the end, was injured in a car accident and buried alive by Vikram Kapoor. Kabir has gathered evidence against the three of them and invited the International Vigilance Squad (IVS) to the island to arrest them. Tisha Khanna, the only innocent one of the group, was invited because, previously unknown to her, she is Maya's fraternal twin sister and Kabir's only remaining biological child. Tisha rejects Kabir's attempts to forge a relationship with her, claiming that she doesn't want his fortune.

Unable to escape the island, the group awaits the arrival of the IVS. In the morning, they hear what sounds like a gunshot from Kabir's room. They find Kabir Malhotra dead in his study, seemingly having committed suicide with a gun.

The IVS, led by Sia Agnihotri (Kangana Ranaut), arrives on the island. She watches the video of the previous night's speech by Kabir, but as they are unable to find the evidence that Kabir claimed to have, they let the guests go. Although the case is officially declared a suicide, Sia is not convinced and puts all four guests under surveillance.

Through flashback, it is revealed that Neil was in love with Maya, who saved his life during a shootout at his casino, and that on the day of her death, she told Neil, in a voice mail, that she was expecting their child. In the present day, Neil evades Sia's surveillance and takes revenge on OP Ramsay and Vikram for what they did to Maya. Both are tricked into giving public confessions of their crimes. Vikram commits suicide, and OP Ramsay dies of a heart attack (his medication being stolen by Neil). Sia, who has been monitoring Vikram and OP Ramsay, knows that Neil is responsible.

It is revealed that Neil is also an officer of the IVS. His real name is Major Arjun Singhania, and he has been in deep cover for many years in the Turkish drug cartel. He, too, doesn't believe that Kabir committed suicide, and works together with Sia to find the true culprit. Neil noticed that Kabir was left-handed, yet the gun that killed him was in his right hand.

Tisha, as Kabir Malhotra's only child, is to inherit Kabir's fortune, but Neil and Sia receive news that Tisha attempted suicide. When Tisha wakes up, she tells them that it wasn't suicide, but someone attacked her in her house. Meanwhile, it is found that Kabir has a brother, Iqbal, who is next in line to inherit his fortune. Sia and Neil travel to the missionary where Iqbal lives, but they find him too ill to speak to them. A nurse tells them that Iqbal had a daughter who died, but Neil notices that there are letters sent to him dated after her supposed death, so she must still be alive.

Neil and Sia travel back to the island, where they confront the late Kabir's personal assistant, Samara. It is revealed that Samara is actually Natasha, Iqbal's daughter and Kabir's biological niece, unknown to Kabir. Neil realised that there was foul play when, at the missionary, he saw a picture of Kabir and Iqbal when they were children, and they were identical twins, so the man in the missionary couldn't have been Kabir's brother. Iqbal reveals himself, explaining that he's been working with Natasha to get Kabir's fortune. Tisha was a surprise they hadn't anticipated. They used Kabir's three guilty guests to deflect suspicion from Samara, predicting that the police would suspect one of the guests as responsible for Kabir's murder.

Iqbal attempts to kill Neil and Sia, but Neil resists, which results in Iqbal being killed and Natasha being arrested.

== Cast ==
- Abhishek Bachchan as Neil Menon / Major Arjun Singhania, a casino owner in Turkey
- Kangana Ranaut as Sia Agnihotri, an International Vigilance Squad (UVS) officer in the United Kingdom
- Gauahar Khan as Samara Shroff / Natasha Malhotra, Kabir's personal assistant and biological niece
- Jimmy Sheirgill as Vikram Kapoor, a film actor
- Boman Irani as Om Prakash "O.P." Ramsay, a political leader and prime ministerial candidate in Thailand
- Anupam Kher as Kabir Malhotra / Iqbal Chand Malhotra
- Shahana Goswami as Tisha Khanna / Tisha Malhotra, a crime journalist in the United Kingdom; Kabir's biological twin daughter; Maya's fraternal twin sister
- Sarah-Jane Dias as Maya Malhotra, Kabir's biological twin daughter; Tisha's fraternal twin sister
- Mantra as Ranbir
- Akash Dhar as Sunil Nair, Sia's assistant
- Benjamin Gilani as Mr. Khanna
- Mohan Kapur as Karamvir, O.P's sidekick
- Sikandar Kher as Sunil Srivastav
- Edward Sonnenblick as Forensic Pathologist
- Abhishek Kapoor as Film Director (cameo appearance)

== Production ==
This film's title was changed from Crooked to the Game. Aishwarya Rai Bachchan was initially considered for the female lead in the film, however after she rejected the role, Pakistani actress Sonya Jehan was cast. Jehan later opted out of the film, leading to Kangana Ranaut being signed.

== Box office ==
Game opened poorly at the box office and grossed only ₹65.9 million in its first week, being declared a disaster. By the end of its theatrical run, the film had only managed to gross ₹73.8 million.

== Soundtrack ==
The film's audio contains seven original songs. The music was composed Shankar–Ehsaan–Loy and Ram Sampath, with lyrics written by Javed Akhtar. The soundtrack was released online on the film's official website.

Game

Soundtrack album by Shankar–Ehsaan–Loy
- Released: 21 February 2011
- Genre: Feature film soundtrack
- Label: T-Series
- Producer: Shankar–Ehsaan–Loy

Shankar–Ehsaan–Loy chronology
West Is West (2011)	Game (2011)	Zokkomon (2011)

=== Track listing ===
No.	Title	Singer(s)	Length
1.	"It's A Game"	Vishal Dadlani	3:09
2.	"It's A Game – Reprise"	Sunitha Sarathy	4:34
3.	"Kaun Hai Ajnabi"	KK, Aditi Singh Sharma	3:58
4.	"Maine Yeh Kab Socha Tha"	Shaan, Anusha Mani, Loy Mendonsa	5:15
5.	"Mehki Mehki"	Shreya Ghoshal, Kshitij Wagh	4:05
6.	"Kaun Hai Ajnabi – Remix"	KK, Aditi Singh Sharma	3:44
7.	"Mehki Mehki – Remix"	Shreya Ghoshal, Ramiz	3:41
