= Uri: The Surgical Strike (soundtrack) =

2019 soundtrack album by Shashwat Sachdev

- Soundtrack album cover

Soundtrack album by Shashwat Sachdev
- Released: 4 January 2019
- Recorded: 2018
- Studios: Kuhn Labs; YRF Studios; New Edge Studios; Asia Music Vision
- Genre: Feature film soundtrack
- Length: 20:05
- Language: Hindi
- Label: Zee Music Company
- Producer: Shashwat Sachdev

Shashwat Sachdev chronology
Veere Di Wedding (2018)	Uri: The Surgical Strike (2019)	Attack: Part 1 (2022)
External audio
- URI - The Surgical Strike Audio Jukebox on YouTube

The music to the 2019 film Uri: The Surgical Strike featured original score and songs composed by Shashwat Sachdev. The film directed by Aditya Dhar and produced by Ronnie Screwvala under RSVP Movies, starred Vicky Kaushal, along with Yami Gautam, Paresh Rawal, Kirti Kulhari and Mohit Raina, and is a fictionalized retelling of the retaliation to the 2016 Uri terror attack. Sachdev worked on the film's music for eight months which utilized synthesizers and orchestra and was recorded at his Kuhn Labs and Synchron Stage Vienna in Austria, with a 150-member crew performing the score conducted by Sachdev. The songs further utilized sparse instrumentation to underline the emotional impact.

The soundtrack album featured five songs with lyrics written by Kumaar, Raj Shekhar and Abhiruchi Chand. It was released under the Zee Music Company label on 4 January 2019, a week prior to the film's release. After Shaswat received acclaim for the score, it was released separately as a 20-track album, two weeks after the film's theatrical run; both the music and background score, met with acclaim and Sachdev won the National Film Award for Best Music Direction (background score) and the Filmfare R. D. Burman Award for Upcoming Music Talent.

== Development ==
Shashwat Sachdev earlier intended to collaborate in a film during 2016, that starred Fawad Khan but was shelved due to the tensions created after the 2016 Uri terror attack and with the Maharashtra Navnirman Sena called for ban on Pakistani actors, which resulted in Khan's exit from the Hindi cinema. However, both Dhar and Sachdev continued to be in touch, and when the former had written the script based on the Uri terror attacks, he presented it to Sachdev, who liked his writing and immediately agreed to be involved in the film. Sachdev called it as a "very precise and tight script and then executed with so much precision". Sachdev worked on the film score and soundtrack of Uri: The Surgical Strike for eight months. The music is a hybrid combination of Western classical music with rock and electronica.

"When I read the script, there was a lot of aggression and power. There's this young army officer who is full of anger which is a powerful and passionate emotion. I started working on the score which brought out that youthfulness, anger and willingness to fight."

— Shashwat Sachdev

While reading the script of Uri: The Surgical Strike, he imagined specific sounds on mind which demanded the intensity and situations. To achieve that sounds, he needed a modular synthesizer, which led Sachdev travel to Berlin to by the synthesizers for recording. He visited the SchneidersLaden music shop as this is where Jóhann Jóhannsson, one of his favourite composers, would buy the synthesizers from there, and would spend 6–7 hours on how to operate the instrument from scratch, adding "I would read manuals in the hotel, stay up nights, create sounds and send to [Aditya Dhar] on voice notes made on my phone." After spending a month in Berlin and buying the instrument, Sachdev operated it at his Kuhn Labs in Mumbai, where he had recorded 90 minutes of music, only parts of it were included in the film.

Sachdev produced ominous sounds with the modular synthesizer, and combined it with orchestra—strings, horn and chorus—for emotional connection, adding "Whatever synth I use doesn't matter because Indians respond ultimately to emotion [...] And emotion comes from acoustic instruments, not electronic." As Sachdev felt that army officers are normal human beings and their sacrifices in the Indian Army, he wrote a melodic piano cue. The orchestral portions were recorded at the Synchron Stage Vienna where he had collaborated with the German orchestra. Sachdev explained on the recording process, stating "They couldn't understand where the score was going [...] You had the war tracks, but also something emotional like The Last Goodbye, which comes in the scene where the Uri martyrs are being remembered." More than 150 musicians worked on recording the score conducted by Sachdev himself.

According to Sachdev, too much music distracts the audience and listeners from the core emotion of the music. He recalled on a sequence, where in a sequence which Vihaan (Vicky Kaushal) plants a bomb in the kurta of a terrorist and walks away, Sachdev added hip-hop beats, but Dhar rejected, saying "This is not Tarantino, dude". Later, he removed the composition in that particular sequence and felt it worked. The songs consisted of sparse instrumentation, iterating his stance on refraining too much music. For the song "Jagga Jiteya", Sachdev had adapted the opening lines of the national anthem "Jana Gana Mana" to the horns. The opening song "Challa" had the tune borrowed from the original Punjabi folk song, where the lyrics depicted on the song being sung by a father for his newborn, but the adapted lyrics described that "the son is going out to die for his motherland to return to mother earth."

== Critical reception ==
Devarsi Ghosh of Scroll.in wrote "Sachdev's soundtrack has a tune for all the usual sequences a war film could have, such as the training montage or the climactic call-to-arms moment. What adds life to the album is Sachdev's approach of moving as far as possible from the sonic universe created by Anu Malik for JP Dutta's films. The aggression inevitably present in the lyrics of a war film's songs does not get echoed in the music. The production is a flab-free treat for the ears." Debarati S Sen of The Times of India wrote "It's not always that you get to hear music that is completely contemporary, yet retains an organic soulful flavour. The aggression of a war film is present, yet, the heart-touching emotions are not compromised with by the composer, and that is why it sounds nothing like the run-of-the-mill music we've got to hear in earlier Bollywood's war movies." Vipin Nair of The Hindu wrote "Shashwat Sachdev composes a rousing five-song soundtrack for the military-themed Uri with one standout number".

Describing it as a "snazzy background score", Sukanya Verma of Rediff.com summarized "Shashwat Sachdev scores a winner". Taran Adarsh of Bollywood Hungama wrote "In terms of music, there is not much to expect. With just five tracks all of which are situational, one does not look for a chartbuster song in such a film. However, the background score is done well, and helps build the crescendo during climactic sequences." Mayur Sanap of Deccan Chronicle wrote "The background score and the clever use of silence at certain moments successfully dials up the intensity."

== Track listing ==
Uri - The Surgical Strike (Original Motion Picture Soundtrack)
No.	Title	Lyrics	Singer(s)	Length
1.	"Challa (Main Lad Jaana)"	Kumaar	Romy, Vivek Hariharan, Shashwat Sachdev	3:27
2.	"Beh Chala"	Raj Shekhar	Yasser Desai, Shashwat Sachdev	5:24
3.	"Jigra"	Kumaar	Siddharth Basrur, Shashwat Sachdev	4:00
4.	"Manzar Hai Ye Naya"	Abhiruchi Chand	Shantanu Sudame, Shashwat Sachdev	4:03
5.	"Jagga Jiteya"	Kumaar	Daler Mehndi, Shashwat Sachdev, Dee MC	3:11
Total length:				20:05

== Background score ==
Uri: The Surgical Strike

Film score by Shashwat Sachdev
- Released: 30 January 2019
- Recorded: 2018
- Studios: Kuhn Studios, Mumbai; Synchron Stage Vienna, Austria
- Genre: Film score
- Length: 50:58
- Label: Zee Music Company
- Producer: Shashwat Sachdev
External audio
- Uri - The Surgical Strike Background Score Jukebox on YouTube

Uri – The Surgical Strike (Original Background Score)
No.	Title	Length
1.	"Seven Sisters"	1:21
2.	"The Martyr"	1:35
3.	"Special Forces"	2:01
4.	"Chandel Revenge"	5:05
5.	"Home Coming"	1:10
6.	"An Unsettling Peace"	2:26
7.	"Mother"	2:17
8.	"Bleed India With Thousand Cuts"	2:09
9.	"The Uri Attack"	5:54
10.	"The Last Goodbye"	3:46
11.	"Two Shirts and a Watch"	2:26
12.	"How's the Josh"	3:22
13.	"Garud"	1:23
14.	"Kashmir"	0:43
15.	"Interrogation"	1:03
16.	"POK"	2:03
17.	"Chase"	3:43
18.	"The Surgical Strike"	3:49
19.	"Guts"	2:25
20.	"Glory"	0:52
21.	"New India"	1:14
Total length:		50:58

== Awards and nominations ==
"What made my background score in 'Uri: The Surgical Strike' stand apart was honesty, humility, and the fact that although it was a small film, everybody made it into a huge deal by appreciating it and watching it multiple times only for the score. It was also a dream-come-true for a lot of other musicians and artists because a person from a Tier II city and a middle-class family had come to Mumbai and made music from very little resources, and stood out from amongst the music that released that year. It was number one for a long time and made me release how not everything needs to be pushed, published, and marketed. If you have an opinion then people are there who would listen. It gives me faith in my work."

— Sachdev, on winning the National Film Award for his musical score.

Ceremony	Date	Category	Recipient	Result	Ref.
National Film Awards	9 August 2019	Best Music Director (Background Score)	Shashwat Sachdev	Won	
Filmfare Awards	15 February 2020	Best Background Score	Shashwat Sachdev	Nominated	
Filmfare Awards	15 February 2020	R. D. Burman Award For Upcoming Music Talent	Shashwat Sachdev	Won	
Mirchi Music Awards	19 February 2020	Song of The Year	"Challa"	Nominated	
Mirchi Music Awards	19 February 2020	Music Composer of The Year	Shashwat Sachdev – ("Challa")	Nominated	
Mirchi Music Awards	19 February 2020	Background Score of The Year	Shashwat Sachdev	Nominated	
Mirchi Music Awards	19 February 2020	Male Vocalist of the Year	Shashwat Sachdev, Romy and Vivek Hariharan – ("Challa")	Nominated	
Mirchi Music Awards	19 February 2020	Lyricist of the Year	Kumaar – ("Challa")	Nominated	
IIFA Awards	24 November 2021	Best Background Score	Shashwat Sachdev	Won	
IIFA Awards	24 November 2021	Best Sound Design	Ravi Soni	Won	
