= John Abraham =

Indian actor and film producer (born 1972)

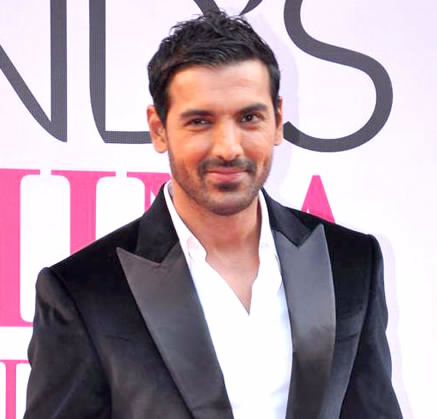
- Abraham in 2013
- Born: 17 December 1972 (age 53); Bombay, Maharashtra, India
- Occupations: Actor; film producer
- Years active: 1999–present
- Works: Full list
- Spouse: Priya Runchal (m. 2014)
- Awards: Full list
- Website: johnabraham.com

John Abraham (born 17 December 1972) is an Indian actor and film producer who works in Hindi films. He is a recipient of one National Film Award along with four Filmfare Awards nominations. Abraham has appeared in Forbes India's Celebrity 100 list since 2017.

After a modelling career, Abraham made his acting debut with the erotic thriller film Jism (2003), a sleeper hit. In the same year, he appeared in the supernatural romantic thriller film Saaya and crime thriller film Paap. He rose to prominence with the action film Dhoom (2004) and the comedies Garam Masala (2005), Taxi No. 9211 (2006), and Dostana (2008). He then starred in the critically acclaimed dramas Water (2005), Kabul Express (2006) and New York (2009), the last of which also turned out to be a commercial success. Despite several commercial failures in the subsequent decade, Abraham achieved success with the 2013 action thrillers Race 2 and drama Madras Cafe; along with the ensemble comedies Housefull 2 (2012) and Welcome Back (2015). Abraham then had commercial successes with the action dramas Dishoom (2016), Parmanu (2018), Satyameva Jayate (2018), Batla House (2019) and Pathaan (2023).

Abraham ventured into film production under his banner J.A. Entertainment with Vicky Donor (2012), which won him the National Film Award for Best Popular Film Providing Wholesome Entertainment. He has since produced several of his films, and also wrote the story of Attack: Part 1 (2022). Outside of his film career, he is the co-owner of the Indian Super League football team NorthEast United FC, and the European T20 Premier League cricket team Rotterdam Dockers. He is also a vegetarian bodybuilder and is an advocate for animal rights.

== Early life and family ==
Abraham was born in Bombay (now Mumbai), Maharashtra, on 17 December 1972 into a family of mixed religious and ethnic heritage. His father is a Malayali Syrian Christian from Kerala and his mother is an Irani Zoroastrian, (Note: According to a 2018 Times of India source, Abraham says his mother is a Parsi and the Parsis have roots in Gujarat, but in an older 2011 NDTV report, Abraham said his mother is a Parsi from Iran, while in a 2025 report he says his mother is Zoroastrian. In another interview, his mother says, "I'm a full Irani") who has many relatives living in Iran. Abraham's Zoroastrian name is "Farhan", but he was baptised with the name "John." He has a younger brother named Alan Abraham. He considers himself a spiritual person but does not follow any particular religion. Abraham grew up in Mumbai and studied at the Bombay Scottish School there. He attended Jai Hind College, University of Mumbai, and then got an MBA degree from NMIMS, Mumbai. His cousin Susy Matthew is an author and has written novels like In a Bubble of Time.

== Career ==
=== Modelling career and acting debut (1999–2003) ===
Abraham started his modelling career appearing in the music video of the song 'Jhanjar' of Hans Raj Hans and 'Surma' by Punjabi singer Jazzy B. He then joined the media firm and Time & Space Media Entertainment Promotions Ltd., which however got closed because of financial crisis. Later, he worked for Enterprises-Nexus as a media planner. In 1999, he won the Gladrags Manhunt Contest and went to the Philippines for Manhunt International, where he won second place. He later modelled in Hong Kong, London and New York City, and appeared in a number of commercial advertisements and other music videos for singers including Pankaj Udhas, Hans Raj Hans and Babul Supriyo. To improve his acting skills, Abraham joined Kishore Namit Kapoor Acting Institute and completed an acting course while juggling modelling assignments.

Considered "the top model of India before he ventured into films", Abraham made his acting debut with Jism in 2003, an erotic thriller film that, according to Box Office India, was "Hit" grossing 1,32,50,000 Rs. He portrayed the role of Kabir Lal, a poor, alcoholic and wayward lawyer who falls in love with Sonia Khanna (played by Bipasha Basu), a wife of a travelling millionaire, who plots to kill her own husband with the company of Kabir. The film met with mixed to positive reviews. Taran Adarsh of Bollywood Hungama commented: "Supermodel John Abraham makes a confident debut. The actor rises beyond his looks and registers a strong impact with his performance, more so towards the second half. His dashing looks and excellent physique only add to his persona".

In the same year, Abraham appeared in Anurag Basu's horror paranormal romance film Saaya alongside Tara Sharma and Mahima Chaudhry. The film garnered mixed to negative reviews and underperformed at the box office. Taran Adarsh wrote: "Saaya clearly belongs to John. No two opinions on that! Enacting a very difficult role, the newcomer actually performs like a veteran and delivers a performance that's bound to win him nominations in the awards categories. His growth as an actor is tremendous!"

In 2003, he appeared in Pooja Bhatt's directorial debut film Paap alongside Udita Goswami. He portrayed the role of Shiven, a police officer, who falls for a Buddhist girl, Kaaya. The film underperformed at the box office, receiving mixed reviews, and also was premiered at the Kara Film Festival. That same year, he appeared in Ahmed Khan's film Lakeer – Forbidden Lines, co-starring Nauheed Cyrusi with other stars such as Sunny Deol, Sunil Shetty and Sohail Khan, which also underperformed at the box office.

=== Breakthrough (2004–2009) ===
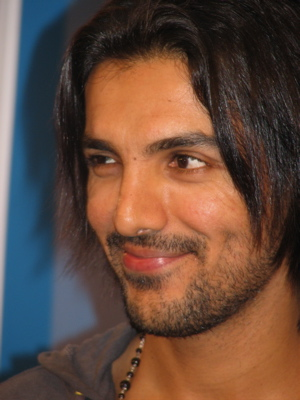
Abraham in 2006

In 2004, Abraham played Kabir, the main antagonist in Dhoom, an action film directed by Sanjay Gadhvi, and produced by Yash Raj Films, multi-starring Abhishek Bachchan, Esha Deol, Uday Chopra and Rimi Sen. The film was the third highest-grossing film of the year, which gained him a Filmfare Award for Best Performance in a Negative Role nomination.

In 2005, he starred in the action thrillers Elaan and Karam, both of which failed at the box office. He followed with the supernatural thriller Kaal and the comedy Garam Masala, both of which did well at the box office. Later that year, he had a role in Water, which portrayed the tragic fate of Hindu widows in British India of the 1930s. The film was written and directed by independent Canadian film-maker Deepa Mehta. It was popular internationally, and was nominated for the 2006 Academy Award for Best Foreign Language Film at the 79th Academy Awards. Abraham attended the ceremony along with the film's crew and makers but the film lost to Germany's The Lives of Others.

In the summer of 2006, Abraham performed at the "Rockstars Concert" along with fellow Bollywood actors Salman Khan, Zayed Khan, Kareena Kapoor, Esha Deol, Shahid Kapoor and Mallika Sherawat. In that same year, he starred in the films Zinda, Taxi No. 9211, Baabul and Kabul Express. Among these Taxi No. 9211 and Kabul Express were substantially successful. Abraham's performance in Taxi No. 9211 was praised by critics, noting that his performances to be maturing with each new film. Nikhil Advani's multi-starrer Salaam-e-Ishq was Abraham's first release in 2007. The movie failed to do well at the Indian box office, though it did well in the overseas markets. His last two 2007 releases included the thriller No Smoking, and the sports film Dhan Dhana Dhan Goal, which emerged as a commercial failure at the box office.

In 2008, Abraham starred alongside Abhishek Bachchan and Priyanka Chopra in Dostana, his only release that year. Produced by Dharma Productions, the film was a financial success with worldwide revenues of over ₹860 million (US$9 million). His only release of 2009 was a production by Yash Raj Films, New York. Costarring Katrina Kaif and Neil Nitin Mukesh, the film follows the lives of three friends when one of them is wrongly detained after 9/11. New York performed well at the box office and received favourable reviews.

=== Comedies and focus on action films (2010–2019) ===
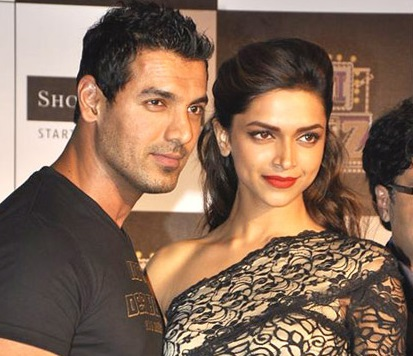
Abraham with Deepika Padukone during Desi Boyz promotions, 2011

In 2010, he was seen in the films Aashayein and Jhootha Hi Sahi. Both of the films turned out to be box office failures. Later on, Abraham appeared in the films Force (2011), Desi Boyz (2011) and Housefull 2 (2012). Force collected ₹347.2 million (US$3.7 million) in India and was declared "Above Average" by Box Office India. Housefull 2 grossed ₹1,140 million (US$12 million) in India. His first film of 2013 was the multi-starrer Race 2, an action thriller that served as a sequel to Race (2008). The film received predominantly negative reviews, but grossed a successful total of ₹1.62 billion (US$17 million). The coming-of-age romantic comedy I, Me Aur Main, underperformed at the box office and received unfavorable reviews. His next release was Shootout at Wadala, in which he portrayed the role of a gangster Manya Surve, which gained mixed to positive reviews. Commercially, the film performed moderately well. Then his movie Madras Cafe, which was also a second movie for him as a producer, garnered much critical acclaim. His next release was Welcome Back, which was successful at the box office, earning ₹168.76 crore (US$18 million) worldwide.

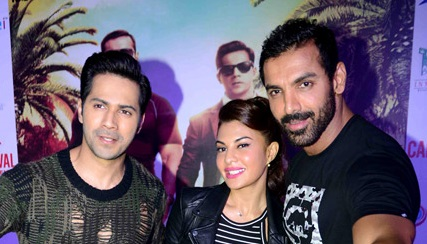
Varun Dhawan, Jacqueline Fernandez and Abraham during Dishoom promotions in 2016

In 2016, his first release was Rocky Handsome which was an average grosser at the box office. His second release of the year was Dishoom, and despite mixed to negative reviews, the film proved to be successful at the box office grossing over ₹1.2 billion (US$13 million) worldwide. His next release of the year was Force 2, the sequel to the 2011 film Force. Force 2 became the highest opening film for Abraham and opened with mixed to positive reviews. Abraham's performance received praise from the audience and critics. His next films in 2018 were the action films Parmanu: The Story of Pokhran with Diana Penty and Boman Irani and Satyameva Jayate with Manoj Bajpayee and Neha Sharma's younger sister Aisha Sharma. Satyameva Jayate was commercially successful earning ₹1.08 billion worldwide. In 2019, he starred in the action thriller Romeo Akbar Walter and played Mrunal Thakur's husband DCP Sanjeev Kumar Yadav in Nikkhil Advani's Batla House, based on the 2008 Batla House encounter case. The latter grossed over ₹1.11 billion (US$12 million) worldwide becoming a commercially successful venture.

Abraham said in 2016 that he had spurned multiple offers for Hollywood films since 2006. He told an interviewer he wanted to focus on making "world standard" Indian films, though he did not rule out international films if an interesting offer came along. In 2018, he produced the Marathi film Savita Damodar Paranjpe. In 2022 his fourth venture, was a Malayalam movie Mike.

=== Setbacks and Pathaan (2020–present) ===
In 2021, Abraham appeared in Mumbai Saga and Satyameva Jayate 2, both of which were box office disasters. He did a cameo in his own production Sardar Ka Grandson alongside Arjun Kapoor and Aditi Rao Hydari, that streamed on Netflix. He produced, wrote and acted in the story of science-fiction actioner Attack: Part 1 (2022), where he co-starred with Rakul Preet Singh and Jacqueline Fernandez. The film released threatically in April 2022 with mixed reviews from critics who praised the action sequences while criticising the screenplay, Taran Adarsh of Bollywood Hungama wrote, "Attack: Part 1 works due to the novel concept, action, VFX and John Abraham's first-rate performance". The film grossed ₹19.20 crore in India and ₹3.50 crore overseas, for a worldwide gross collection of ₹22.70 crore eventually bombing at the box office.

In his second release of 2022, he starred as Bhairav Purohit co-starring Disha Patani, Arjun Kapoor and Tara Sutaria in Mohit Suri's psychological thriller Ek Villain Returns. The film released theatrically in July 2022 and opened to mixed reviews from critics. Sukanya Vema of Rediff wrote, "Ek Villain Returns falls back on the popularity of the Galliyan track to boost its appeal". It grossed ₹49.63 crores in India and ₹19.01 crore overseas, for a worldwide gross collection of ₹68.64 crore (US$7.3 million) and was a box office flop. In November 2022, he produced along with Bhushan Kumar and Krishan Kumar the romantic comedy film Tara Vs Bilal starring Harshvardhan Rane and Sonia Rathee.

His first release of 2023 came with Siddharth Anand's mass action thriller Pathaan produced by YRF, co-starring Shah Rukh Khan and Deepika Padukone. It is the fourth instalment in the YRF Spy Universe. Principal photography for Pathaan began in November 2020. The film was shot over various locations. Pathaan was released in India on 25 January 2023, coinciding with the Republic Day. It received positive reviews from critics and broke several box-office records, including the biggest opening day and opening weekend for a Bollywood film. Abraham's performance was highly praised with critics calling him one of the biggest highlights in the movie . Taran Adarsh of Bollywood Hungama termed the film a "complete entertainer replete with action, emotions, patriotism, humour, thrill, and of course, the star power of Shah Rukh Khan". Pathaan had a worldwide gross collection of ₹1,050 crore (US$110 million).

Vedaa (2024) is a crime-action thriller directed by Nikkhil Advani, featuring John Abraham as a grieving officer supporting a young Dalit woman's fight for dignity, blending intense action with a poignant social message. Abraham's subsequent releases included Tehran directed by Arun Gopalan and produced by Dinesh Vijan, and The Diplomat, released on 14 March 2025. Both Tehran and The Diplomat were critically acclaimed.

In April 2026, Abraham announced the beginning of filming of Force 3, the third in the series, starring himself with Harshvardhan Rane and Tanya Maniktala.

== Personal life ==
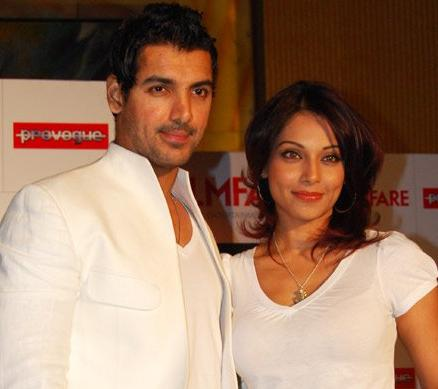
Abraham with Bipasha Basu in 2007.

During the filming of Jism in 2002, Abraham began to date his co-star Bipasha Basu. While together, the two were often referred to as a supercouple in the Indian media. Abraham once stated, "I have always kept quiet about my personal life and will continue to maintain a dignified silence. It's just the way my parents raised me. I rather leave it at speculation." The couple broke up in 2011.

Abraham is married to Priya Runchal, an Indian-American financial analyst and investment banker from the United States but native to McLeod Ganj, whom he met in Mumbai in December 2010. They married on 3 January 2014. Runchal is also the chairperson of NorthEast United FC.

Off-screen, Abraham is a bodybuilder and fitness model and he abstains from smoking, consuming alcohol, and any intoxicants, although he did smoke as part of filming No Smoking (2007) and Dishoom (2016) but later quit the habit after filming ended. Due to this, he often avoids many parties and functions. Abraham is a sport bike collector.

== Other work and media image ==
Abraham is widely known as one of the "Action Heroes" in Bollywood. Rediff.com noted that Abraham is an actor who is "well aware of his limitations and scores high on both -- disarming modesty and sharp career moves". Forbes India noted, "Abraham has had an unconventional but successful career." Filmfare stated, "John's macho charm, sculpted body and a dynamic screen presence hasn't faded over the years." It termed him a "reliable draw at the box office". Verve termed him "good-natured, down-to-earth star" and stated, "John has reinvented himself to emerge as a stronger performer on celluloid".

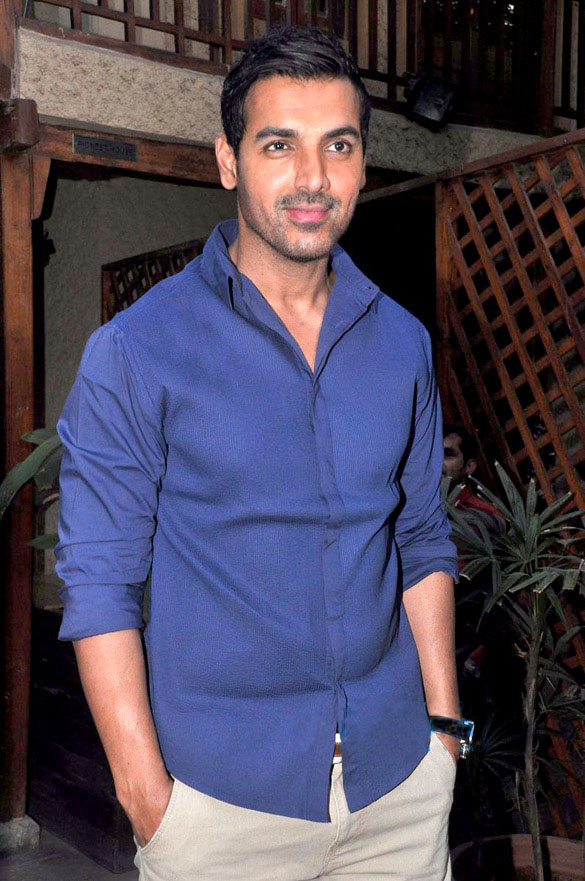
Abraham in 2013

Abraham made his debut in Forbes India's Celebrity 100 list of 2017, ranking 52nd with an annual income of ₹141.3 million (US$1.5 million). He peaked to 42nd place in 2018 with an annual income of ₹193 million (US$2.1 million) and in 2019, he ranked 46th with an annual income of ₹285 million (US$3.0 million). Abraham topped the "Sexiest Asian Men" list compiled by Eastern Eye in 2008. In the same list, he ranked 7th in 2011 and 8th in 2012. In the Times' 50 Most Desirable Men list, he ranked 29th in 2017 and 17th in 2018. In Rediff.com's "Top Bollywood Actors" list, Abraham was placed 11th in 2006.

Abraham also takes an active interest in the United Way, based in Denver, United States. In January 2009, he flagged off the Mumbai Marathon, an annual event organised to benefit the United Way. He did not run the marathon, but encouraged the participants by waving at them from the start line. Abraham is an animal lover and takes an interest in PETA and Habitat for Humanity. In April 2013, on behalf of PETA, Abraham wrote a letter to the Minister for Environment and Forests, Jayanthi Natarajan, asking that she make all circuses in India animal-free. Abraham is also the celebrity supporter of UNHCR India, and promotes the cause of refugees in India. According to his website, he donated ₹10 lakh (US$11,000) to the Lilavati Hospital and Research Centre, Mumbai. He has a fashion line – branded JA Clothes – which primarily features his favourite article of clothing, jeans. In 2024, Abraham was placed 28th on IMDb's List of 100 Most Viewed Indian Stars.
