= Dombivli Fast =

- Poster
- Directed by: Nishikanth Kamath
- Written by: Nishikanth Kamath (screenplay); Sanjay Pawar (screenplay and dialogues)
- Produced by: Sameer Gaikwad
- Starring: Sandeep Kulkarni; Shilpa Tulaskar; Sandesh Jadhav
- Cinematography: Sanjay Jadhav
- Edited by: Amit Pawar
- Music by: Sanjay Mourya; Alwyn Rego; Sameer Phatarpekar (background score)
- Release date: 16 December 2005
- Running time: 112 minutes
- Country: India
- Language: Marathi
- Budget: ₹95 lakh

Dombivli Fast (Marathi: डोंबिवली फास्ट) is a 2005 Indian Marathi-language psychological action drama film directed by Nishikanth Kamat. It is the story of a middle class bank employee, Madhav Apte, an ordinary, law-abiding and honest citizen who faces constant frustration with the injustice and corruption that pervades in all walks of his life. The film portrays Apte's mental breakdown as he reaches his breaking point, and his rampage as a vigilante across Mumbai to set things right. The film stars Sandeep Kulkarni in the lead with Shilpa Tulaskar and Sandesh Jadhav.

The film bears resemblance to the 1993 Hollywood film Falling Down, starring Michael Douglas.

Kamat remade the film in Tamil as Evano Oruvan with R. Madhavan playing the lead in the year 2007.

== Plot ==
Madhav Apte lives a lower-middle-class life in Dombivli area of Mumbai together with his wife Alka, son Rahul and daughter Prachi. He travels to his workplace, Nariman Point, each day by train; and takes the Dombivli Fast local train to return home. Cheating, corruption, and dishonesty are something which he hated the foremost. He was a person with strong morals and principle, and lived life in step with it. Wherever he would see injustice and corruption, he would fight and argue; be it along with his wife or his daughter's educator or perhaps his boss. Alka was jaded with Madhav's adamant behavior and in a very fit of anger, had told him that his values and morals are only worth something if he can bring a change in society. Little did Alka know that her words would make a robust impact on Madhav! Then started the fight of Madhav against everyone who broke the foundations and was on the incorrect side of the law. Soon, his actions shook the complete city and brought a substantial change too. But how long will society allow Madhav to bring this change? And till what extent will Madhav achieve bringing a change? He's pushed to a corner by everybody who finds his path of righteousness too difficult to handle, and in some unspecified time in the future, he snaps. He goes on a rampage trying to correct everything that goes against his principles, and so starts mayhem on the streets of Mumbai, ultimately ending in a very tragic climax with him getting encountered.

== Cast ==
- Sandeep Kulkarni as Madhav Apte
- Shilpa Tulaskar as Alka Apte, Madhav's wife
- Dushyant Wagh as Rahul Apte, Madhav's son
- Sandesh Jadhav as Insp. Subhash Anaspure
- Srushti Bhokse as Prachi Madhav Apte, Madhav Apte's daughter
- Chandrakant Gokhale as Keshav Joshi, Patient Relative in Hospital (Guest Role)
- Harshada Khanvilkar as Women speaker
- Balkrishna Shinde

== Awards ==
- Maharashtra State Film Award for Best Film
- 2006 Star Screen Awards - Best Actor Male (Marathi) - Sandeep Kulkarni
- 2006 Asian Festival of First Films - Best Director(Swarovski Trophy) - Nishikant Kamat
- 2006 Indian Film Festival of Los Angeles - Best Film(Jury Award)
- 2006 National Film Awards - Best Feature Film in Marathi(Silver Lotus Award)
- 2006 Pune International Film Festival - Best Marathi Film (Sant Tukaram award from the Government of Maharashtra)

== See also ==
- Evano Oruvan
- Falling Down
