= Attack: Part 1 =

2022 Indian film by Lakshya Raj Anand

- Theatrical release poster
- Directed by: Lakshya Raj Anand
- Written by: Lakshya Raj Anand; Sumit Batheja; Vishal Kapoor
- Story by: John Abraham
- Produced by: Jayantilal Gada; Ajay Kapoor; John Abraham
- Starring: John Abraham; Rakul Preet Singh; Jacqueline Fernandez; Prakash Raj; Naufal Azmir Khan; Ratna Pathak Shah
- Cinematography: Will Humphris; P. S. Vinod; Soumik Mukherjee
- Edited by: Aarif Sheikh
- Music by: Shashwat Sachdev
- Production companies: Pen Studios; JA Entertainment; AK Productions
- Distributed by: Pen Marudhar Entertainment
- Release date: 1 April 2022
- Running time: 123 minutes
- Country: India
- Language: Hindi
- Budget: ₹80 crore
- Box office: est. ₹31.61 crore

Attack: Part 1 is a 2022 Indian Hindi-language science fiction action film directed by Lakshya Raj Anand, who co-wrote the film with Sumit Batheja and Vishal Kapoor, based on a story by John Abraham, who stars in the lead role as a cyborg, alongside Jacqueline Fernandez, Rakul Preet Singh, Prakash Raj and Ratna Pathak Shah in supporting roles.

Attack was released on 1 April 2022 and received mixed to negative reviews from critics and eventually bombed at the box office.

== Plot ==
In 2010 Indian Army officer Arjun Shergill and his team are on a mission to capture terrorist Rehman Gul, who attacked an Indian army convoy two days before. After a shootout Arjun arrests Rehman and saves a suicide bomber, who is Rehman's son Hamid Gul.

Two years later at Mumbai Airport, Arjun meets air hostess Ayesha and they fall in love. Some time later, as the result of an attack orchestrated by Hamid's men, Ayesha is killed at the airport and Arjun is paralysed from the neck down. V. K. Subramaniam, Chief of Indian Intelligence and Arjun's superior officer, proposes an AI-operated supersoldier program to the Prime Minister at a meeting to tackle rising attacks under Hamid and to prepare for future wars, which are shifting from traditional warfare to AI and machines. Defence Research and Development scientist Sabaha Qureshi has been modifying the supersoldiers program for 7 years and is on the verge of a major breakthrough.

The Prime Minister agrees and Subramaniam selects Arjun for the program. Arjun is hesitant but agrees as he wants to avenge Ayesha's death. Arjun operates himself under the command of the Intelligent Robotic Assistant (IRA), which is restricted due to Arjun's trauma. But soon, Sabaha turns Arjun into a cyborg using technology and a chip is inserted into Arjun's body.

The government discovers that Hamid is procuring chemical weapons in Eastern Europe. Sabaha arrives at the parliament to submit Arjun's progress to the Defence Minister. While conversing with IRA, Arjun learns that Hamid is planning to attack the parliament and informs Subramaniam, who is at the Sansad Marg.

Hamid and his fellow terrorists, disguised as Rapid Action Force (RAF) personnel, hijack parliament and capture the parliament ministry and Union ministers including the Prime Minister and Sabaha. Arjun leaves for the parliament with National Security Guard (NSG) commandos, but Hamid demands that the NSG retreat from the parliament in exchange for the release of 50 hostages. Subramabiam insists to the caretaker Prime Minister Digvijay Singh that a partial extraction be performed, and sends Arjun to covertly infiltrate the parliament and relay information. Arjun sneaks into the parliament with IRA's help and kills some guards as he enters the control room and provides live feed to Subramaniam.

Hamid demands the release of Rehman. Sabaha is caught by the terrorist Hussain but Arjun kills Hussain and rescues her. Arjun reveals himself to Hamid via a walkie talkie and Hamid insists that Digvijay, Subramaniam and others command Arjun to surrender. Arjun agrees to surrender and is taken to Hamid where one of Hamid's men knocks Arjun's neck, causing a malfunction in IRA. Hamid demands safe passage to flee in an aeroplane to Ecuador and releases the hostages, but activates a sarin gas bomb to explode in the parliament. Rehman is released from prison and taken to the airport.

Sabaha retrieves her laptop and reboots IRA, enabling Arjun to kill all the terrorists. Arjun tells Subramaniam about the bomb and asks to intercept Hamid, but Hamid has already escaped through an old tunnel and leaves for the airport in an ambulance. Arjun tells Sabaha to retreat with the hostages and chases Hamid to the airport where he crashes the flight. Arjun kills Hamid and deactivates the bomb. Sabaha rescues the hostages, and the NSG commandos kill Rehman by throwing him out of the plane in mid-air. Arjun is appreciated by Subramaniam and the ministers, and leaves the parliament by ambulance. Arjun is appointed for another mission.

== Cast ==
- John Abraham as Major Arjun Shergill, a cyborg and India’s first supersoldier
- Rakul Preet Singh as Dr. Sabaha Qureshi, DRDO scientist
- Jacqueline Fernandez as Ayesha Roy, an air hostess and Arjun's lover
- Prakash Raj as Vadraj Kumar "V.K" Subramaniam, Defence Secretary and Arjun's superior officer
- Ratna Pathak Shah as Shanti Shergill, Arjun's mother
- Serena Walia as I.R.A (voice), Arjun's personal AI assistant
- Elham Ehsas as Hamid Gul, Rehman's son and the main antagonist
- Rajit Kapur as Home Minister Digvijay Singh
- Kiran Kumar as Indian Army Chief K.V. Singh
- Habib Al Aidroos as Rehman Gul, Hamid's father
- Tamara D'Souza as Juhi, Ayesha's friend
- Mir Mehroos as Young Hamid Gul
- Jaimini Pathak as Negotiator Sukrut
- Babrak Akbari as Mustafa
- Nimish Desai as Prime Minister
- Ashish Nijhawan as Hussain
- Shahnawaz Bhatt as Saqlain
- Vikas Tomar as Home Minister's Assistant
- Ranjit Punia as CRPF Officer
- Ranjeet Singh as RAF Officer
- Karan Mehat as Shahid

== Production ==
Principal photography began in January 2020. The production was put on hold in March 2020 due to COVID-19 pandemic. The shooting resumed in February 2021.

== Release ==
Attack: Part 1 was originally scheduled for theatrical opening worldwide on 14 August 2020, but it was delayed due to the shooting suspension. The film was scheduled for release on 28 January 2022, but it was postponed due to the surge in Omicron variant cases. The film was theatrically released on 1 April 2022.

=== Home media ===
The film streamed on ZEE5 on 27 May 2022.

== Reception ==
=== Box office ===
Attack earned ₹3.51 crore at the domestic box office on its opening day. On the second day, the film collected ₹3.75 crore. On the third day the film had a worldwide gross of ₹4.25 crore, taking total domestic weekend collection to ₹11.51 crore.

As of 14 April 2022, the film grossed ₹19.20 crore in India and ₹3.50 crore overseas, for a worldwide gross collection of ₹22.70 crore.

=== Critical response ===
Attack: Part 1 received mixed reviews from critics with praise for its action scenes while the script was criticised. On the review aggregator website Rotten Tomatoes, 50% of 6 critics' reviews are positive, with an average rating of 4.8/10.

Rachana Dubey of The Times of India gave 3.5/5 stars and wrote, "Attack: Part One, is an engaging watch, from start to finish." Shaheen Irani of OTTplay gave 3.5/5 stars and wrote, "Attack is most definitely a film that should turn into a franchise. Part 1 of this movie is a thorough entertainer for people who enjoy action to the T. The film is a surprisingly cool and edge-of-the-seat thriller." Grace Cyril of India Today gave 3/5 stars and wrote, "Attack stands well with its VFX and new concepts, all coated in a layer of slick modern sci-fi."

Avinash Lohana of Pinkvilla gave 3/5 stars and wrote, "Keep an open mind, don't compare, and give the film a chance. You might like it." Bharathi Pradhan of Lehren gave 3/5 stars and wrote, "John may take a bow because he is one of the producers of the film and has been credited with the story idea too." Taran Adarsh of Bollywood Hungama gave 3/5 stars and wrote, "Attack - Part 1 works due to the novel concept, action, VFX and John Abraham's first-rate performance."

Rohit Bhatnagar of The Free Press Journal gave 3/5 stars and wrote, "'Attack - Part 1' might be a beginning of a new era in the Hindi film industry only if you ignore the long list of loopholes and cliché sequences." Saibal Chatterjee of NDTV gave 2.5/5 stars and wrote, "To the credit of director Lakshya Raj Anand, the fast-paced hostage drama stops short of being a dreadful assault on the senses." Shubhra Gupta of Indian Express gave 2.5/5 stars and wrote, "We know exactly how things will pan out, no strain on the brain. Everything is straightforward, no complicated characters, no morally ambiguous situations."

Vijay Mruthyunjaya of Deccan Herald gave 2.5/5 stars and wrote, "'Attack’ does not preach patriotism with painfully long dialogues and agonising sentiments. It relies wholly on lightning and thunder and Abraham delivers both in equal measure." Shubham Kulkarni of Koimoi gave 2/5 stars and wrote, "Lakshya Raj Anand only focuses on the battle sequences and everything that happens between them looks lazy." Tatsam Mukherjee of Firstpost gave 1/5 stars and wrote, "Whatever might be the measures taken by an earlier John Abraham film, there seems to be a renewed bloodlust in Attack, that's actively trying to court the ‘masses’ of Uri: The Surgical Strike and The Kashmir Files."

Monika Rawal Kukreja of Hindustan Times wrote, "Attack is your high-on-action sci-fi flick which is slick and savvy. Watch it for John being at his best after a long time and don't care too much about the unrealistic world it takes you to." Anuj Kumar of The Hindu wrote, "Taut and fast-paced, the action choreography is closer to the stuff that Hollywood offers and the electric background score provides reason for the adrenaline glands to make their presence felt." Onmanorama wrote, "Overall, the film is well-written, but the story seems to be an amalgamation of many sci-fi English films. The film is slickly shot and the director wastes little time getting to the action."

== Soundtrack ==
Attack

Soundtrack album by Shashwat Sachdev
- Released: 13 March 2022
- Recorded: 2021–2022
- Venue: YRF
- Studio: YRF Studios
- Genre: Feature film soundtrack
- Length: 30:40
- Language: Hindi
- Label: Zee Music Company
- Producer: Shashwat Sachdev

Shashwat Sachdev chronology
Uri: The Surgical Strike (2019)	Attack (2022)	Tejas (2023)
External audio
- Attack Part 1 – Full Album on YouTube

The film's music is composed by Shashwat Sachdev while lyrics written by Kumaar and Bjorn Surrao.

Track listing
No.	Title	Singer(s)	Length
1.	"Ik Tu Hai"	Jubin Nautiyal, Shashwat Sachdev	4:10
2.	"Main Nai Tuttna"	Vishal Mishra, Shashwat Sachdev, Tisoki	3:25
3.	"Chal Hatt"	Girish Nakod, Magic, Shashwat Sachdev	2:26
4.	"Phir Se Zara"	Jubin Nautiyal, Shashwat Sachdev	3:50
5.	"La La La" (Lyrics by Bjorn)	Bjorn, Shashwat Sachdev	2:18
6.	"BOMB!"	Shreya Jain, Girish Nakod, Shashwat Sachdev	2:25
7.	"Crazy Now"	Shreya Jain, Magic, Shashwat Sachdev, Tisoki	2:43
8.	"Akh Kashni"	Surbhi Yadav, Nakul Chugh, Shashwat Sachdev	2:12
9.	"Phir se Zara - Sha"	Shashwat Sachdev	3:34
10.	"Durga Gayatri Mantra"	Shreya Jain, Nakul Chugh, Shashwat Sachdev	3:16
Total length:			30:19

=== Background Score ===
Attack

Film score by Shashwat Sachdev
- Released: 2 June 2022
- Recorded: 2021–2022
- Genre: film score
- Length: 43:24
- Language: Hindi
- Label: Zee Music Company
- Producer: Shashwat Sachdev

Shashwat Sachdev chronology
Uri: The Surgical Strike (2019)	Attack (2022)	Tejas (2023)
External audio
- Attack Part 1 – Original Soundtrack on YouTube

Attack (Original Background Score)
No.	Title	Length
1.	"Super Soldier Rises"	2:44
2.	"Infinite"	2:27
3.	"Prologue Is Past"	2:40
4.	"The Strom Within"	2:05
5.	"Justice Served"	0:46
6.	"Nightmare Comes True"	2:50
7.	"Mothers"	1:45
8.	"Future Is Now"	2:10
9.	"Into The Sync"	0:57
10.	"Phoenix Rises"	1:12
11.	"Killing A Nation"	4:06
12.	"The Unholy War"	1:12
13.	"Ethics and Justice"	3:45
14.	"Eye For An Eye"	3:05
15.	"Almost Lost"	1:55
16.	"Lover Forever And Beyond"	2:03
17.	"Adrenaline Rush"	3:11
18.	"Evil At Play"	3:12
19.	"Courage is Invisible"	1:19
Total length:		43:24

== Future ==
As indicated by the title, the film was made as part of a planned franchise. Director Anand has stated to Hindustan Times, "We have created these characters whose journey doesn't end after part one, the journey begins. And he takes the learning from what happens in part one to part two and three. It automatically lends itself to action films". For Attack: Part 2, John Abraham has said that a script is ready and they "signed on for Attack 2 with Jayanthi Bhai even before the release of Attack."

== See also ==
- 2001 Indian Parliament attack
