= Ayananka Bose =

Indian cinematographer

- Born: 23 January; Meerut, Uttar Pradesh, India
- Other name: Bose
- Occupation: Cinematographer

Ayananka Bose is an Indian cinematographer who works in Hindi films. He studied cinematography at the Film and Television Institute of Tamil Nadu in Chennai. He won the best cinematographer of Zee Cine Awards for the film Kites in 2011.

== Early life ==
Bose was born in Meerut, Uttar Pradesh to a Bengali-speaking family. He was educated at the Film and Television Institute of Tamil Nadu and received his early training from ace cinematographer and director, Rajiv Menon. He has worked as an assistant director to Menon in Kandukondain Kandukondain (2000).

He then started assisting Ravi K. Chandran in the films Dil Chahta Hai (2001), Kannathil Muthamittal (2002), Koi... Mil Gaya (2003), and Boys (2003). He worked as the first assistant cameraman in Lakshya (2004), the camera operator in Black (2005), and the associate cinematographer in Yuva (2004), before becoming an independent cinematographer.

His first film was Paheli, starring Shah Rukh Khan and Rani Mukerji, and directed by Amol Palekar. He is one of the very few cinematographers in India who works on both TV commercials and films regularly.

== Filmography ==
Year	Film	Language	Notes
2005	Paheli	Hindi	Associate cinematographer
2005	Main Aisa Hi Hoon	Hindi	
2006	Teesri Aankh: The Hidden Camera	Hindi	
2006	Umrao Jaan	Hindi	
2007	Jhoom Barabar Jhoom	Hindi	
2008	Tashan	Hindi	
2008	Dostana	Hindi	
2010	Kites	Hindi	
2010	I Hate Luv Storys	Hindi	
2011	Force	Hindi	
2012	Student of the Year	Hindi	
2013	Once Upon a Time In Mumbaai Dobara	Hindi	
2014	Kick	Hindi	
2016	Dishoom	Hindi	
2017	Kaabil	Hindi	
2017	Duvvada Jagannadham	Telugu	
2017	Judwaa 2	Hindi	
2018	Race 3	Hindi	
2019	Devi 2	Tamil; Telugu	
2019	Gaddalakonda Ganesh	Telugu	
2021	Radhe	Hindi	
2021	The Rapist	Hindi	
2022	Freddy	Hindi	
2023	Satyaprem Ki Katha	Hindi	
2023	The Great Indian Family	Hindi	
2024	Mr. Bachchan	Telugu	
2026	Ustaad Bhagat Singh	Telugu	
2026	Krishnavataram Part 1: The Heart (Hridayam)	Hindi	
2026	Hai Jawani Toh Ishq Hona Hai	Hindi	

== Awards and nominations ==
- 2011 : Zee Cine Awards : Won for Best Cinematography for Kites.
- 2009 : Filmfare Awards : Nominated for Best Cinematography for Dostana.
