= Rocky Handsome =

2016 Indian film by Nishikant Kamat

- Theatrical release poster
- Directed by: Nishikant Kamat
- Written by: Ritesh Shah
- Based on: The Man from Nowhere (2010) by Lee Jeong-beom
- Produced by: John Abraham; Sunir Khetrapal
- Starring: John Abraham; Shruti Haasan; Nathalia Kaur; Nishikant Kamat; Diya Chalwad; Uday Tikekar; Sharad Kelkar; Teddy Maurya
- Cinematography: Shanker Raman
- Edited by: Aarif Sheikh
- Music by: Sunny and Inder Bawra; Guest composers: Ankit Tiwari; Bombay Rockers
- Production companies: JA Entertainment; Azure Entertainment
- Distributed by: Azure Entertainment
- Release date: 25 March 2016
- Running time: 126 minutes
- Country: India
- Language: Hindi
- Budget: ₹200 million
- Box office: ₹350 million

Rocky Handsome is a 2016 Indian Hindi-language neo-noir action thriller film directed by Nishikant Kamat and produced by John Abraham and Sunir Khetrapal under Azure Entertainment and J.A Entertainment. An official adaptation of the 2010 Korean film The Man from Nowhere (2010), it stars John Abraham and Diya Chalwad in the lead roles, while Shruti Haasan, Nathalia Kaur, Kamat (in his Hindi film debut as an actor and sole Hindi film appearance), Teddy Maurya and Sharad Kelkar appear in supporting roles.

Rocky Handsome was released on 25 March 2016 to mixed reviews from critics with praise for acting and action sequences, but became a box-office bomb.

== Plot ==
Based in a city in Goa, recluse Kabir Ahlawat lives a quiet life running a pawn shop. His next-door neighbor is Anna, a drug addict and bar dancer living with her little daughter Naomi, who develops a special bond with Kabir. ACP Dilip Sangodkar, who is working with the Anti-Narcotics Commission alongside senior Goa police officer DCP Rebello, is after Mantoo, a crime boss supported by Kevin Ferriera and his brother Luke Ferriera, who control a mass racket in organ harvesting and drug manufacturing, backed by their Thai bodyguard Attila, a professional assassin.

One night, Anna and her boyfriend steal drugs from Mantoo's henchman Big Show. Anna hides the drugs in a camera and pawns it to Kabir. The consignment loss enrages Mantoo, who assigns Kevin to recover the stolen drugs. Luke and Attila reach Anna's place, where they torture Anna for the camera and Naomi becomes an eyewitness to the brutal torments. Under duress, Anna reveals the location of the drug as a response, whence Big Show enters Kabir's house along with his man Viju Dempo, demanding the camera. Kabir is obliged to hand the camera to Luke when he tells him that Naomi and Anna are his captives.

Kabir gets a call from Kevin to make a delivery to Mantoo and promises to release them if the delivery is successful. Kabir delivers the drugs to Mantoo, where he finds that Sangodkar and his team have already raided Mantoo's haven. Kabir chases a fleeing Mantoo, but is arrested by the cops when they find Anna's corpse with all her organs harvested in Kabir's car. Kevin brutally finishes Mantoo, claiming all his organs, and becomes the new drug lord.

During interrogation, Kabir escapes from the police station. The officers are bewildered by his combat skills and learn that he was a former decorated RAW soldier, who retired after his pregnant wife Rukshida was killed outside a military hospital.

Parallel to Sangodkar's investigation, Kabir decides to crack down on Luke and Kevin himself, and engages a dealer in the process; at a nightclub, he kills Viju as the dealer becomes bait, and is grievously injured by Attila, who disrupts the violent crackdown, but breaks into a medical shop and performs an impromptu surgery at his hideout after escaping. Meanwhile, Sangodkar's attempts to force progress into the case attract intelligence scrutiny when a senior RAW officer visits the ANC team to warn him and Rebello against taking Kabir lightly. Following a conversation with Sangodkar, who learns the truth about the crackdown at Mantoo's, Kabir then continues on his journey, where he finds and frees several child slaves in a drug manufacturing plant. Luke, who is present at the plant, is killed in a blast as Sangodkar listens on the phone.

Kabir tracks down Kevin, who tells him that he had Naomi killed and shows a container that has what he says are her eyes. Enraged, Kabir kills all the gang members, including Attila and Kevin. As Kabir prepares to commit suicide out of grief, an unscathed Naomi arrives. It is revealed that Attila, who took pity on her because she had been kind to him, had spared her life—the eyes in the container belonged to the gangsters' surgeon. Kabir gets arrested, but the officers allow Naomi to ride with him. Kabir asks them to stop at a convenience store, where he buys a backpack and school supplies for Naomi. Kabir asks her if she can manage until he returns, to which she agrees with him and the two embrace.

== Cast ==
- John Abraham as Kabir Ahlawat "Rocky" "Handsome", a former RAW operative and SG soldier, Rukshida's husband and widower, Naomi's father
- Diya Chalwad as Naomi Ahlawat, Kabir's daughter, Rukshida's daughter
- Nathalia Kaur as Anna, Naomi's mother
- Nishikant Kamat as Kevin Ferriera
- Sharad Kelkar as ACP Dilip Sangodkar
- Shiv Kumar Subramaniam as DCP Rebello
- Suhasini Mulay as Carla Aunty
- Teddy Maurya as Luke Ferriera, Kevin's brother
- Kazu Patrick Tang as Attila, Kevin's henchman
- Uday Tikekar as Mantoo
- Sanjay Khapre as Inspector Pitale
- Gurpreet Saini as Viju Dempo, Kevin's man

=== Cameos ===
- Shruti Haasan as Rukshida Ahlawat, Kabir's wife, Naomi's mother
- Nora Fatehi in the song "Rock Tha Party"

== Production ==
John Abraham, who is the producer of the film, plays the lead role. Shruti Haasan was cast as John Abraham's wife, while seven-year-old Diya Chalwad, who was first seen in Kick, plays an important role. Nathalia Kaur, who was seen as a dancer in Ram Gopal Varma's Department, plays the mother of the child. Sunir Khetrapal, who is the co-producer of the film told in an interview that "the theme of our film is the action. We are getting action directors from abroad--Eastern Asia—for the stunts." According to Khetrapal, the shooting in Hyderabad was for about 45–50 days. While the second schedule was filmed in Goa, the third was in Mumbai.

== Soundtrack ==
Rocky Handsome

Soundtrack album by Sunny Bawra, Inder Bawra, Ankit Tiwari, and Bombay Rockers
- Released: 22 February 2016
- Genre: Feature film soundtrack
- Length: 39:07
- Language: Hindi
- Label: T-Series

The music was composed by Sunny Bawra, Inder Bawra, and Ankit Tiwari, while the lyrics are penned by Kumaar, Manoj Muntashir, Abhendra Kumar Upadhyay, Sachin Pathak, Sagar Lahauri, and Shekhar Astitwa. The album contains a total of 7 tracks with the first song "Rock Tha Party" was released on 15 February 2016. The soundtrack was released on 22 February 2016 which included 6 songs. Later, an unplugged version of "Alfazon Ki Tarah" was released on 22 March 2016, which was voiced by Shreya Ghoshal, John Abraham and Ankit Tiwari.

No.	Title	Lyrics	Music	Singer(s)	Length
1.	"Rock Tha Party"	Kumaar	Bombay Rockers	Bombay Rockers	03:31
2.	"Rehnuma"	Manoj Muntashir, Sagar Lahauri	Sunny Bawra, Inder Bawra	Shreya Ghoshal, Inder Bawra	04:21
3.	"Alfazon Ki Tarah"	Abhendra Kumar Upadhyay	Ankit Tiwari	Ankit Tiwari	06:21
4.	"Aye Khuda"	Sachin Pathak, Shekhar Astitwa	Sunny Bawra, Inder Bawra	Rahat Fateh Ali Khan	06:15
5.	"Titliyan"	Sagar Lahauri	Sunny Bawra, Inder Bawra	Sunidhi Chauhan	06:02
6.	"Aye Khuda" (Duet Version)	Sachin Pathak, Shekhar Astitwa	Sunny Bawra, Inder Bawra	Rahat Fateh Ali Khan, Shreya Ghoshal	06:15
7.	"Alfazon Ki Tarah" (Unplugged)	Abhnendra Kumar Upadhyay	Ankit Tiwari	Shreya Ghoshal, John Abraham, Ankit Tiwari	06:21
Total length:					39:07

== Release ==
The film was released on 25 March 2016.

=== Home media ===
The satellite and digital rights were sold to Sony Max and SonyLIV.

== Reception ==
Rocky Handsome received mixed reviews from critics with praise for its acting and action sequences, while the script received criticism.

=== Critical response ===
Bollywood Hungama gave 3.5/5 stars and wrote "Despite the film having a simple plot, Rocky Handsome has been garnished with engrossing drama and action stunningly." Ananya Bhattacharya of India Today gave 3/5 stars and wrote "Rocky Handsome is a sumptuous feast for action-lovers." Renuka Vyavahare of The Times of India gave 2.5/5 stars and wrote "The Hindi remake of a Korean film struggles to blend action and emotion."

Priyanka Prasad of Filmibeat gave 2.5/5 stars and wrote "Rocky Handsome is bound to appeal only to those fond of action films." Rohit Vats of Hindustan Times gave 2/5 stars and wrote "Rocky Handsome is a very average film with some finely executed action sequences on display, but don't expect anything more from this film." Koimoi gave 2/5 stars and praised the action scenes, but criticized its execution and weak storyline.

Anna M. M. Vetticad of Firstpost described the film as "paisa vasool" for its action sequences and John Abraham's performance. Namrata Joshi of The Hindu wrote "Rocky Handsome is satisfied living off borrowed aesthetics even while clinging to its Indian self – but for all the wrong reasons." Anupama Chopra of Film Companion described the film as an "almost frame-by-frame remake of the 2010 Korean blockbuster The Man from Nowhere."

=== Box office ===
The film earned ₹70 million (US$730,000) in one day including paid previews in India. The film went down on day two with collections of ₹42.5 million (US$440,000) crore nett. The film earned ₹35.0 million (US$360,000) on third day and the film had a very low weekend of ₹188 million (US$2.0 million) crore nett with ₹19.8 million (US$210,000) crore nett on paid previews. The collections on Monday were low at around ₹20 million (US$210,000) nett. The film grossed ₹210 million (US$2.2 million) in its first week and ₹251 million (US$2.6 million) by the end of its theatrical run.
