= Abhinay Deo =

Indian filmmaker

- Born: Mumbai, Maharashtra, India
- Occupation: Filmmaker
- Years active: 2004–present
- Parent(s): Ramesh Deo; Seema Deo
- Family: Deo family

Abhinay Deo is an Indian filmmaker.

== Life and career ==
Abhinay Deo is an Indian commercial director turned film director. Abhinay's first movie was Game (2011). His second, Delhi Belly, was released on 1 July 2011. Before directing commercials, he graduated with a degree in architecture.

His parents are the actors Ramesh Deo and Seema Deo. He is younger brother of Ajinkya Deo, who is also a well-known actor in Marathi films.

He made his mainstream directorial debut through Game and followed it with Delhi Belly, for which he received Filmfare Award for Best Debut Director and is also known for directing works such as Game (2011) and Force 2 (2016). In 2018 he directed the comedy thriller Blackmail with Irfan Khan in the lead. After making several thrillers he moved to different genre by making Doosra.

Deo has worked with brands such as Coca-Cola, Pepsi, Nike, Toyota, Cadbury and Nestlé.

== Filmography ==
| Year | Film | Notes |
|---|---|---|
| 2011 | Game | |
| 2011 | Delhi Belly | Filmfare Award for Best Debut Director Nominated - Filmfare Award for Best Director |
| 2013 | 24 | TV series |
| 2016 | 24: Season 2 | TV series |
| 2016 | Force 2 | |
| 2018 | Blackmail | |
| 2024 | Savi | Remake of Anything for Her |
| 2026 | Brown | TV series on ZEE5 |
