= Nishikant Kamat =

Indian filmmaker and actor (1970–2020)

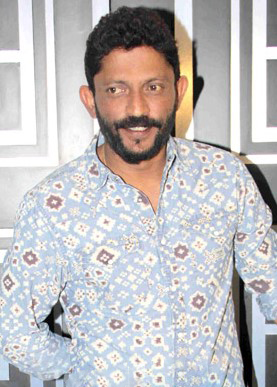
- Kamat at the screening of Daddy, 2017
- Born: 17 June 1970; Mumbai, Maharashtra, India
- Died: 17 August 2020 (aged 50); Hyderabad, Telangana, India
- Occupations: Director; actor
- Years active: 2004–2020

Nishikant Kamat (17 June 1970 – 17 August 2020) was an Indian filmmaker and actor. His debut film, Dombivali Fast earned him accolades in Marathi cinema, as it went on to become the biggest Marathi film of the year. He remade his film, in Tamil with R. Madhavan in the lead as Evano Oruvan, which opened to rave reviews. He also acted in the Marathi film Saatchya Aat Gharat.

His Hindi debut directorial was based upon the 2006 Mumbai Bombings, titled, Mumbai Meri Jaan. He directed Force, starring John Abraham and debut of Vidyut Jamwal. It was a remake of the Tamil film Kaakha Kaakha. In 2015, he directed Drishyam, a remake of the Malayalam film of the same name. He also played a negative role in his own film Rocky Handsome (2016).

== Personal life ==
Born in a Marathi family, Kamat was an alumnus of Mumbai's Wilson College and Ramnarain Ruia College where he rose to prominence in the amateur theatre circuit.

Kamat died at the age of 50 due to cirrhosis and COVID-19.

== Filmography ==
=== As writer and director ===
Year	Title	Language	Writer	Director	Notes
2004	Saatchya Aat Gharat	Marathi	Yes	No	
2005	Dombivli Fast	Marathi	Yes	Yes	
2007	Evano Oruvan	Tamil	Yes	Yes	Remake of Dombivli Fast
2008	Mumbai Meri Jaan	Hindi	No	Yes	
2011	Force	Hindi	No	Yes	
2014	Lai Bhaari	Marathi	No	Yes	
2015	Drishyam	Hindi	No	Yes	
2016	Rocky Handsome	Hindi	No	Yes	
2016	Madaari	Hindi	No	Yes	

=== As actor ===
Year	Title	Role	Notes
2004	Hava Aney Dey	Chabia	Indo-French film
2004	Saatchya Aat Gharat	Aniket	
2011	404	Professor Anirudh	
2016	Rocky Handsome	Kevin Ferriera	
2017	Fugay	Bairappa	
2017	Daddy	Inspector Vijaykar Nitin	
2017	Julie 2	Film Director Mohit	
2018	Bhavesh Joshi Superhero	Rana	

=== Television ===
- The Final Call - Creative Producer (2019–present)
- Rangbaaz Phirse - Creative Producer

== Awards and nominations ==
- National Film Award for Best Feature Film in Marathi for Dombivali Fast in 2006
