= Evano Oruvan =

- Poster
- Directed by: Nishikant Kamat
- Written by: Dialogue: Madhavan; Dialogue Supervisor: Thiralnidhi Seeman
- Screenplay by: Nishikant Kamat; Paul
- Story by: Nishikant Kamat
- Based on: Dombivli Fast by Nishikant Kamat
- Produced by: Abbas–Mustan; K. Sera Sera; Co-producer: Madhavan
- Starring: Madhavan; Sangeetha; Thiralnidhi Seeman
- Cinematography: Sanjay Jadhav
- Edited by: Amit Pawar
- Music by: Title Song:- G. V. Prakash Kumar; Songs:- Sanjay Mourya; Background Song:- P. Sameer
- Production companies: K Sera Sera Limited; Burmawalla Brothers
- Distributed by: Leukos Films; Pyramid Saimira
- Release date: 7 December 2007
- Running time: 112 minutes
- Country: India
- Language: Tamil

Evano Oruvan (transl. Someone) is a 2007 Indian Tamil-language psychological drama film directed by Nishikant Kamat who made his debut in the Tamil film industry with the film. It is a remake of Kamat's Marathi film, Dombivli Fast, which is loosely based on the 1993 American film Falling Down. The film stars Madhavan and Sangeetha, with Seeman acting in a pivotal role.

The film's music is composed by P. Sameer and the title song by G. V. Prakash Kumar. It is produced by noted Hindi directors Abbas Burmawalla and Mustan Burmawalla as they make their debuts as Tamil film producers under the distribution of their home banner, Burmawalla Limited. It had been previously named, Ivan Yaaro. The film's title is based on a song from Alai Payuthey (2001), also starring Madhavan.

== Plot ==
Sridhar Vasudevan is a middle-class family man working at a bank. He is idealistic, principled, and recognizes a deep sense of belonging with the society he is part of. He gets annoyed and flustered by illegal and semi-legal activities happening around him. His wife Vatsala persistently demands that he be more "flexible" and make more money, but Sridhar does not accede. He endures the activities around him because he anticipates a change in people's mindsets. He thinks that over time, they will become more honest, socially aware, and willing to make small personal sacrifices for the greater good of all, like him.

Vatsala is a typical middle-class homemaker and a caring mother of two children, Varsha and Varun. Societal imperfections and related problems matter very little to her. She is more concerned about her reactive husband, thinking about ways to save him from the effects of his angry outbursts and steer him away from his impractical thoughts and deeds.

At some point, Sridhar faces a case of deceit that compels him to take action. Provoked by his deep anger and guilt, he decides to retaliate for wrongs done to him, violently if required. When charged two rupees extra for a cool drink, he picks up a cricket bat and smashes the shop. From that incident onward, Sridhar starts taking the law into his own hands, trying to bring about instant change wherever needed. A string of incidents occurs; he thrashes the Area Councillor, the insincere hospital employees, the water supplier, and many more. Sridhar's anger goes beyond these incidents, targeting individuals who ignore norms for their own benefit. Sridhar is depicted as a representative for every common man in today's society, who, even after seeing and going through such wrong things, tolerates them to avoid disturbing his settled routine. Because of his behaviour and approach, Sridhar is termed a criminal, harmful to his fellow men.

Inspector Vetri Maran is appointed to shoot Sridhar in an arranged "encounter". Vetri Maran, though not incorruptible, feels bad about the police-corruption nexus. He is a good-hearted cop and inwardly feels justified by Sridhar's approach. He comes to a quiet agreement with the young man, personally approves his action, then arranges for the "encounter killing". The film ends with Vetri Maran shooting Sridhar dead.

== Cast ==
- Madhavan as Sridhar Vasudevan
- Sangeetha as Vathsala Vasudevan
- Seeman as Vetri Maran
- Mirchi Senthil as Sridhar's friend
- Devadarshini as Vetri Maran's wife
- Bayilvan Ranganathan as Police Inspector
- Sampath Ram
- Amarasigamani
- Dinesh
- Visweswara Rao as Shopkeeper

== Music ==
The film stars only one song "Unathu Enathu Endru Ulagil Enna Ullathu", music composed by G. V. Prakash Kumar and penned by Na. Muthukumar, a soundtrack was not released. The film score (played at the end) was composed by P. Sameer.

== Reception ==
Evano Oruvan got very favourable reviews, with Rediff calling it a "must-watch" and Sify Moviebuzz giving it a "very good" rating. The Hindu wrote "Few and far between they may be, but it is films such as ‘Evano Oruvan’ (U) that make film lovers optimistic about the future of Tamil cinema. Rising against wrongs and striving to right them is typical of any hero. But in showcasing the mindset of a middleclass citizen who generally gets lost in the sea of faces we see everyday, this Leukos Films and Abbas Mustan presentation is indeed different". Revathi of Kalki praised the star cast, score, cinematography, story while praising director for directing the film with finesse carrying strong plot, measured screenplay but felt if he had avoided things like television interviews and public looking up Madhavan as hero, it would have been a compelling work nevertheless this Evano Oruvan (someone) is one amongst us. Chennai Online called it "worth a watch".

== See also ==
- Dombivali Fast
- Falling Down
