= Force 2 =

2016 Indian film by Abhinay Deo

Force2
- Theatrical release poster
- Directed by: Abhinay Deo
- Written by: Parveez Shaikh; Jasmeet K. Reen
- Produced by: Vipul Shah; Viacom 18 Motion Pictures; John Abraham
- Starring: John Abraham; Sonakshi Sinha; Tahir Raj Bhasin
- Cinematography: Imre Juhasz; Mohana Krishna
- Edited by: Amitabh Shukla; Sanjay Sharma
- Music by: Score: Prasad Sashte; Songs: Gourov-Roshin; Amaal Mallik
- Production companies: Sunshine Pictures Pvt. Ltd; J.A. Entertainment
- Distributed by: Viacom 18 Motion Pictures
- Release date: 18 November 2016
- Running time: 127 minutes
- Country: India
- Language: Hindi
- Budget: ₹41 crore
- Box office: ₹58.8 crore

Force 2 is a 2016 Indian Hindi-language action thriller film directed by Abhinay Deo and produced by Vipul Shah. The film stars John Abraham, Tahir Raj Bhasin, and Sonakshi Sinha in the lead roles. It is the sequel to the 2011 film Force and the second installment of the Force film series.

Principal photography of the film commenced in August 2015.

Force 2 was released on 18 November 2016, and although it was a commercial disappointment at the box office due to demonetisation, the movie received positive reviews. A sequel, Force 3, is in development as of March 2026, with expected release in March 2027.

== Plot ==
In China, some of the RAW agents are being killed by someone. One of the agents is Harish, who is the best friend of Assistant Commissioner of Police Yashvardhan "Yash" Singh. Before being killed, Harish passes an important coded message in a book to Yash, who is still not recovered from the loss of his wife, Maya. After receiving the book, Yash learns of a conspiracy that has been set in motion, targeting only RAW agents, and takes the book and the clues to the RAW headquarters, where the agency understands the legitimacy of the situation.

Yash is teamed with another RAW agent, Sub Inspector Kamaljeet "KK" Kaur. The maker her in charge of the operation. They track down the culprit in the Indian embassy in Budapest. The mastermind of the conspiracy against RAW agents is Shiv Sharma, a nerdy hacker. In Budapest, a cat and mouse chase begins between Shiv and KK-Yash. They come close to nabbing him several times, but he always proves to be a step ahead and manages to escape every time. While digging into Shiv's past for more information, Yash eventually learns from his aide Sawant and RAW chief Anjan Das that Shiv is actually a pseudonym used by the terrorist to mask his real identity as Rudra Pratap Singh, who is the son of a RAW agent Karan Pratap Singh.

Karan had been sacrificed in an operation years ago, and Rudra was left heartbroken after HRD Minister Brijesh Verma branded Karan and several other RAW agents as traitors, which led Rudra's mother to commit suicide. Yash learns that Rudra is now seeking revenge from RAW for betraying Karan and ultimately realizes that his real target is Brijesh. In an assembly in Budapest, Rudra gears up to shoot Brijesh, though KK and Yash reach there in time and kill him before he can do any harm. Before Rudra dies, Yash forces Brijesh to accept his mistakes in front of the media, clearing Karan's name. Rudra dies happily after hearing this. In the aftermath, Maya's spirit appreciates Yash and suggests that KK will be a perfect match for him.

== Cast ==
- John Abraham as A.C.P Yashvardhan ″Yash″ Singh
- Sonakshi Sinha as Sub Inspector Kamaljeet Kaur aka K.K.
- Tahir Raj Bhasin as Rudra Pratap Singh alias Shiv Sharma
- Narendra Jha as RAW Head Anjan Das
- Adil Hussain as HRD Minister Brijesh Verma
- Vikram Kapadia as Naren Kaushik
- Patricia Mittler as Martinez
- Genelia D'Souza as Maya Yashwardhan Singh, Yash's wife as a spirit (cameo appearance)
- Raj Babbar as Zonal Director of Intelligence Bureau Manish Singh Rajput (cameo appearance)
- Freddy Daruwala as RAW agent Harish Chaturvedi, Yash's best friend (cameo appearance)
- Boman Irani as Karan Pratap Singh, Rudra's father and a former RAW agent (cameo appearance)
- Shubhangi Latkar as Rudra's mother who commits suicide. (cameo appearance)

Additionally, Mohnish Behl (whose character, Atul Kalsekar, dies in Force) makes a photographic cameo appearance in one of the group photos in Yash's apartment.

== Soundtrack ==
Force 2

Soundtrack album by Gourov-Roshin and Amaal Mallik
- Released: 27 October 2016
- Genre: Feature film soundtrack
- Length: 16:40
- Language: Hindi
- Label: T-Series

Gourov-Roshin chronology
| Commando 2 (2017) | Force 2 (2016) | Mubarakan (2017) |

Amaal Mallik chronology
| M.S. Dhoni (2016) | Force 2 (2016) | Badrinath Ki Dulhania (2017) |

Singles from Force 2
- 1. "Rang Laal" Released: 21 October 2016

The film score was composed by Prasad Sashte, who had earlier composed the score of Holiday: A Soldier Is Never Off Duty. The lyrics have been written by Kumaar and Rashmi Virag, and the songs have been composed by Gourov Roshin and Amaal Mallik. Its first song, Rang Laal, which is sung by Dev Negi, John Abraham and Aditi Singh Sharma was released on 21 October 2016. The full soundtrack was released on 27 October 2016.

Track listing
| No. | Title | Lyrics | Music | Singer(s) | Length |
|---|---|---|---|---|---|
| 1. | "Rang Laal" | Kumaar | Gourov-Roshin | Dev Negi, John Abraham, Aditi Singh Sharma | 3:45 |
| 2. | "O Janiya" | Kumaar | Gourov-Roshin | Neha Kakkar | 4:22 |
| 3. | "Catch Me If U Can" | Kumaar | Gourov-Roshin | Amaal Mallik | 4:21 |
| 4. | "Ishaara" | Rashmi Virag | Amaal Mallik | Armaan Malik | 4:12 |
| Total length: | | | | | 16:40 |

== Reception ==
=== Critical reception ===
On review aggregator Rotten Tomatoes, the film holds an approval rating of 63%, based on 8 reviews with an average rating of 5/10.

Taran Adarsh of Bollywood Hungama gave 3/5 stars and wrote "Force 2 is a power packed adrenaline pumping action thriller which has the right mixture of zing and force". Ananya Bhattacharya of India Today gave 3/5 stars and wrote "Force 2 is a decent one-time watch". and Nihit Bhave of The Times of India gave 3/5 stars and wrote "In spite of a familiar story, it's a decent time at the cinema for the thrill-seekers; the action won’t disappoint. Go ahead and may the force be with you!".

Shaheen Parkar of Mid-Day gave 2/5 stars and wrote "'Force 2' is high on style, low on substance". Rohit Vats of Hindustan Times gave 2/5 stars and wrote "John Abraham and Sonakshi Sinha’s film has a noble heart. It wants to get the undercover agents, who selflessly serve the nation, their due, but the narrative hasn’t taken a favourable shape". Shubhra Gupta of The Indian Express gave 1.5/5 stars and wrote "Neither John Abraham's hot bod nor Tahir Raj Bhasin's interesting portrayal of the villain can force this film out of the 'obvious' territory. The long car chases will tire you out too".

=== Box office ===
The film has grossed ₹66 million on its first day, becoming John Abraham's highest opening grosser. The film faced problems due to demonetization, which was active at the time of its release and grossed ₹44.20 crore in India and ₹526.0 million worldwide.

== Game ==
An official game based on the film has been launched after the release of the film by Hungama Digital Media.
