= Mumbai Meri Jaan =

- Theatrical release poster
- Directed by: Nishikant Kamat
- Written by: Yogesh Vinayak Joshi; Upendra Sidhaye
- Produced by: Ronnie Screwvala
- Starring: R. Madhavan; Irrfan Khan; Soha Ali Khan; Paresh Rawal; Kay Kay Menon
- Cinematography: Sanjay Jadhav
- Edited by: Amit Pawar
- Music by: Sameer Phaterpekar
- Production company: UTV Motion Pictures
- Distributed by: UTV Motion Pictures
- Release date: 22 August 2008
- Running time: 135 minutes
- Country: India
- Language: Hindi
- Box office: ₹5.04 crore

Mumbai Meri Jaan (transl. Mumbai My Life) is a 2008 Indian Hindi-language drama film directed by Nishikant Kamat and produced by Ronnie Screwvala. The film stars R. Madhavan, Irrfan Khan, Soha Ali Khan, Paresh Rawal and Kay Kay Menon. It follows the aftermath of the 11 July 2006 Mumbai train bombings.

== Plot ==
Rupali Joshi is a successful reporter who is getting married in two months, Nikhil Agrawal is an environmentally conscious executive who rides the train to work every day and is expecting his first child, Suresh is a struggling computer technician who spends his time loafing at a local cafe and criticizing Muslims, meanwhile, Sunil Kadam struggles with the corruption and inefficiency of the Mumbai Police and his boss, Tukaram Patil, who is nearing retirement.

On the morning of July 11, Nikhil and Suresh are in the second class compartment of a train when a bomb goes off in the first class compartment. The two survive, but Nikhil is too afraid to take the train again and is diagnosed with acute stress disorder. Suresh becomes fixated on targeting the city's Muslims, but on-duty Kadam and Patil intervene to prevent him from provoking him. Kadam and Patil harass a street vendor named Thomas, who resorts to phoning in bomb threats in local malls in retaliation. After an elderly man suffers a heart attack while the police are evacuating one mall, Thomas feels guilty and decides to stop.

Arriving at the bombing scene to report on the attack, Rupali is devastated to discover that her fiancé is among the casaulties. Her grief deepens to outrage when the news network she works for exploits her personal tragedy for higher ratings. Meanwhile, Suresh pursues a Muslim man he suspects of being a terrorist, however, after Patil intervenes and delivers a firm lecture on communal harmony, Suresh befriends the man.

While Nikhil's wife goes into labour, he must confront his fear and board a train to get her to the hospital. Across the city, millions observe a moment of silence for those killed in the bombings. In the aftermath, Patil retires from the police force, earning forgiveness from Kadam for his past corruption. Having overcome his fear, Nikhil rushes to his family, while a remoreseful Thomas offers a single rose to the elderly man whose heart attack he caused.

== Cast ==
- Paresh Rawal as Constable Tukaram Patil
- Kay Kay Menon as Suresh
- Irrfan Khan as Thomas
- R. Madhavan as Nikhil Agarwal
- Soha Ali Khan as Rupali Joshi
- Vijay Maurya as Constable Sunil Kadam
- Santosh Juvekar as Ashok
- Kavin Dave as Zandu
- Sachin Pathak as Guddu
- Rajesh Bhosle as Manya
- Saksham Dayama as Yusuf
- Sameer Dharmadhikari as Ajay Pradhan
- Ramdas Jadhav as Constable Sawant
- Rajendra Shisatkar as Constable Shinde
- Ayesha Raza Mishra as Sejal Agarwal
- Smita Jaykar as Sejal's mother
- Deepak Shroff as Sejal's father
- Rio Kapadia as Rensil
- Anand Goradia as Ashish
- Vibhavari Deshpande as Archana Kadam
- Anand Tiwari as Drug addict
- Kadambari Ravi as Drug addict's girlfriend
- Kamlesh Sawant as Police Inspector
- Shri Vallabh Vyas as Drug addict girlfriend's father
- Prinal Oberoi as Anusha
- Upendra Sidhaye as Mall receptionist
- Nishikant Kamat as Vinod
- Narayani Shastri as Shweta

== Awards and nominations ==
=== Won ===
- Filmfare Critics Award for Best Movie
- Filmfare Best Screenplay Award
- Filmfare Best Editing Award
- National Film Award for Best Special Effects for Govardhan (Tata Elxsi)
- Best Feature Film at the New Generation Cinema Lyon Film Festival

=== Nominated ===
- Asia Pacific Screen Awards - Best Screenplay

== Music ==
The end credits feature the song "Aye Dil Hain Mushkil" (also known as "Bombay Meri Jaan") from the 1956 film C.I.D., performed by Mohammed Rafi and Geeta Dutt.
