= Come from Away (film) =

2021 live film recording of the 2017 musical of the same name

- Promotional release poster
- Directed by: Christopher Ashley
- Written by: Irene Sankoff; David Hein
- Based on: Come from Away by Irene Sankoff; David Hein
- Produced by: Jennifer Todd; Bill Condon; Nick Meyer; Mark Gordon
- Starring: Petrina Bromley; Jenn Colella; De'Lon Grant; Joel Hatch; Tony LePage; Caesar Samayoa; Q. Smith; Astrid Van Wieren; Emily Walton; Jim Walton; Sharon Wheatley; Paul Whitty
- Cinematography: Tobias A. Schliessler
- Edited by: Leslie Jones; Virginia Katz
- Music by: Irene Sankoff; David Hein
- Production companies: Apple Studios; Entertainment One; Junkyard Dog Productions; RadicalMedia; Alchemy Production Group
- Distributed by: Apple TV+
- Release date: September 10, 2021
- Running time: 106 minutes
- Countries: United States; Canada
- Language: English

Come from Away is a 2021 musical film comprising a live stage recording of Irene Sankoff and David Hein's 2017 musical of the same name, which tells the true story of 7,000 airline passengers who were stranded in the small town of Gander in Newfoundland, where they were housed and welcomed, after the September 11, 2001 terrorist attacks. The film, produced in response to the shutdown of Broadway caused by the COVID-19 pandemic in the spring of 2020, was directed by Christopher Ashley and filmed in front of an audience that included frontline workers and 9/11 survivors in May 2021 at the Gerald Schoenfeld Theater in New York City, featuring members of the 2021 Broadway cast.

The film was released on Apple TV+ on September 10, 2021, a day before the 20th anniversary of the 9/11 attacks. It received highly positive reviews from critics.

== Plot ==
On the morning of September 11, 2001, the townspeople of Gander describe life in Newfoundland and how they learn of the September 11 attacks on the radio ("Welcome to the Rock"). Claude, the mayor of Gander, is informed of the attacks by Janice, a new reporter in town, while at a local Tim Hortons. The town receives the news that the US airspace has been closed, causing US-bound flights to be diverted across Canada, including 38 to Gander International Airport ("38 Planes"). This nearly doubles the population of Gander, and the townspeople make preparations to care for the 7,000 stranded passengers. Beulah and Annette, two schoolteachers, prepare the local school to take in passengers, while Janice asks for the community to provide resources ("Blankets and Bedding").

For hours, the plane passengers are forbidden from leaving the planes, and are without information about the attacks. They express frustration and fear at being stranded. A Gander SPCA worker, Bonnie, goes into the plane holds to search for animals on the planes, and Claude reaches an agreement with Garth, a union leader, to pause the bus drivers' strike and transport passengers ("28 Hours/Wherever We Are"). The passengers are eventually transported to Gander and surrounding towns for shelter ("Darkness and Trees"). A Muslim passenger, Ali, is temporarily detained. The local bus drivers take passengers to the towns and explain the culture of Newfoundland while navigating language barriers with international passengers ("On the Bus"/"Darkness and Trees (reprise)"). The passengers learn why they were grounded and watch replays of the attacks on television ("Lead Us Out of the Night"). They attempt to contact their families ("Phoning Home") and experience disorientation and stress at their situation ("Costume Party").

The town tries to manage food, sanitation, and other necessities for the guests. Some of the passengers try to get home, but are informed by Oz, the constable of Gander, that travel to the US takes several days. Nick, a British passenger, and Diane, a Texan, go for a walk with a gay couple from Los Angeles, both named Kevin. Bonnie and her husband Doug discover two rare bonobo chimpanzees in the hold of a plane. An American, Bob, is asked to take grills from backyards to set up for a community cookout; he fears he will be shot for stealing, but he finds everyone is friendly and willing to help. Hannah, the mother of a New York firefighter, bonds with Beulah and worries about her son ("I Am Here"). Many of the passengers of various religious beliefs go to a local Catholic church or other spaces around town to pray ("Prayer"). Ethnic and national tensions erupt among the passengers and townsfolk ("On the Edge"). To alleviate this, the passengers are invited to a local bar and some are initiated as honorary Newfoundlanders ("Heave Away"/"Screech In"). One pilot who has been diverted, Beverley, reflects on her experience as the first female captain for American Airlines ("Me and the Sky").

The planes prepare to leave, and Ali is subjected to a strip search prior to leaving on suspicion he may be a terrorist. When flights are delayed, Nick and Diane go for a walk around the town and realize they will miss each other when they leave Gander ("The Dover Fault"/"Stop the World"). When the planes are cleared for takeoff, the passengers express happiness at returning to the US, and set up a donation fund for the people of Gander ("38 Planes" (reprise)"/"Somewhere in the Middle of Nowhere"). After the events of the last five days, both the townspeople and passengers experience loneliness and fear about the state of the world; the two Kevins' relationship has fallen apart due to the stress of the crisis, and Hannah is devastated to learn her son has died ("Something's Missing").

Ten years after the attacks, the townspeople and the passengers reunite in Gander (including Diane and Nick, who have since married) and celebrate the relationships formed while the passengers were stranded ("Ten Years Later"/"Finale").

== Cast ==
- Petrina Bromley as Bonnie Harris and others
- Jenn Colella as Annette, Beverley Bass and others
- De'Lon Grant as Bob and others
- Joel Hatch as Claude Elliott and others
- Tony LePage as Garth, Kevin Tuerff and others
- Caesar Samayoa as Ali, Kevin Jung and others
- Q. Smith as Hannah O'Rourke and others
- Astrid Van Wieren as Beulah Davis and others
- Emily Walton as Janice Mosher and others
- Jim Walton as Doug Harris, Nick Marson and others
- Sharon Wheatley as Diane Gray and others
- Paul Whitty as Oz Fudge and others

== Production ==
In November 2017, it was announced that The Mark Gordon Company would produce a feature film adaptation of the musical, with Sankoff and Hein writing the screenplay and Christopher Ashley as director. In an April 2019 interview, Sankoff and Hein stated that the intention was to film in Gander and cast lesser-known actors, with residents of Gander as film extras.

On February 2, 2021, it was announced that due to the COVID-19 pandemic and its impacts on the film industry and the performing arts, the plans for the film adaptation were cancelled in favor of producing a live film recording of the stage production with the members of the Broadway cast reprising their roles, to be released in September 2021 on the 20th anniversary of the 9/11 attacks. It was produced and financed by Entertainment One and RadicalMedia and filmed in May 2021 at the Gerald Schoenfeld Theater in front of an invited audience including survivors and first responders from the 9/11 attacks, with Ashley directing and Gordon still attached as producer. Joining the producing team are Jennifer Todd, Bill Condon and one of the stage production's producers, Junkyard Dog Productions. Sankoff, Hein, Jon Kamen, Dave Sirulnick and Meredith Bennett executive produce. The film employed 222 people including the members of the New York cast, crew, staff and creative and film teams. On April 30, 2021, Apple TV+ acquired the film's distribution rights.

== Reception ==
=== Critical response ===
According to review aggregator website Rotten Tomatoes, 98% of 42 critics have given the film a positive review, with an average rating of 8.3/10. The critics consensus reads: "Come from Away sifts through the wreckage of tragedy to find hope -- and the healing power of human connection." On Metacritic, the film received a score of 83 out of 100 based on 9 critics, indicating "universal acclaim".

== See also ==
- The Day the World Came to Town, 2002 book
- Diverted, 2009 TV mini-series
- Come from Away, 2017 musical
- You Are Here, 2018 documentary film
