= Michael Rubinoff =

Canadian theatre producer

Michael Rubinoff MSC
- Born: 1977 (age 48–49)
- Education: University of Western Ontario (LL.B)
- Occupations: Theatrical producer, lawyer

Michael Rubinoff (born 1977) is a Canadian theatre producer and lawyer, who has produced several musical theatre productions across Canada and the United States. He is best known as the originating producer of Come from Away, the longest-running Canadian musical in Broadway history. He established the Canadian Music Theatre Project (CMTP) in 2011, which was an incubator for developing and workshopping new Canadian musicals.

== Early life and education ==
Rubinoff attended University of Western Ontario, where he received his Bachelor of Arts degree in political science. He also graduated with a law degree in 2001 from the University of Western Ontario, where he was valedictorian of his graduating class and received the Dean Ivan C. Rand Award for academic standing and service to the law faculty. He was also twice elected president of the Western Law Student Legal Society. While enrolled as a student, Rubinoff ran as an independent candidate in the London North Centre riding against Joe Fontana during the 1997 federal election. In his final year of law school, he also directed the university's production of Blood Brothers. Rubinoff is also a 2004 graduate of the Commercial Theatre Institute's intensive producing program in New York.

== Career ==
=== Law career ===
After receiving his law degree, Rubinoff articled with Goodman and Carr in 2001. He also worked as a lawyer in private practice in Toronto, mainly working as a commercial real estate lawyer. He also worked as an entertainment law associate.

Rubinoff left his law practice in 2010 so that he could become an associate dean of the visual and performing arts department at Sheridan College. In addition, Rubinoff's experience producing and presenting small to mid-sized musicals in Toronto influenced his decision to leave law to instead work in the entertainment industry and develop new Canadian musicals.

=== Musical theatre producer ===
In August 2002, Rubinoff presented his first musical, a local production of A Chorus Line, which played at the Jane Mallett Theatre. He put on the musical using his own personal savings. The musical was presented during the time in which Rubinoff finished his articling at Goodman and Carr and being called to the bar in the fall of 2002. The musical became the highest grossing show to ever play at the theatre, until Rubinoff's production of Evita, which played there in 2003.

Following this, Rubinoff began producing small off-Broadway versions of plays in Toronto. In 2003, Rubinoff co-produced This Is Our Youth with the Canadian Stage Company, which was directed by Woody Harrelson. In 2006, he produced Boygroove, which won a Dora Mavor Moore Award. He also produced and presented Dog Sees God: Confessions of a Teenage Blockhead, which starred Jake Epstein and Tatiana Maslany, and Love, Loss, and What I Wore, which starred Mary Walsh. Rubinoff was also a producer of the 2007 Toronto production of Evil Dead: The Musical, which ran for sixteen months.

While still practicing as a lawyer, Rubinoff approached Sankoff and Hein with his idea for a musical about the planes that were unexpectedly ordered to land at Gander International Airport following the September 11 attacks. They began working on the musical, Come from Away, which was then workshopped and developed at Sheridan College under Rubinoff's guidance. Rubinoff is an originating producer of Come from Away, which has played on Broadway, in the West End, Canada, and Australia, among other countries. An annual summer production of the musical, directed by Jillian Keiley, also runs in Gander, Newfoundland and Labrador.

In 2016, Rubinoff began developing a musical about Norman Bethune, in partnership with Shanghai Dramatic Arts Centre. According to Rubinoff, this would be the first Canadian-Chinese musical. By 2019, the partnership with China was paused over Canada-China political tensions although the musical has still been in development.

In 2023, Rubinoff produced Maggie, a musical with music by Johnny Reid, which premiered at Theatre Aquarius in Hamilton, Ontario. In 2024, the musical played at the Goodspeed Opera House, to critical acclaim.

In 2024, Rubinoff partnered with Tim Hortons to produce The Last Timbit, a musical in celebration of the company's 60th anniversary, with music and lyrics by Anika Johnson and Britta Johnson and a book by Nick Green. The musical played at the Elgin Theatre in June 2024, and was released for streaming on Crave later that year.

In February 2025, Rubinoff announced that he was producing It's a Good Life If You Don't Weaken, a new musical featuring the songs of The Tragically Hip, in partnership with David and Hannah Mirvish. The musical features a book by Ahmed Moneka and Jesse LaVercombe, and is directed by Mary Francis Moore. Set in 2002, it tells an original story about Waleed, an exiled journalist who arrives in Canada and falls for Kate, the owner of a local music store, and incorporates Hip songs such as "Bobcaygeon," "Ahead by a Century," "New Orleans Is Sinking," "Wheat Kings," "Grace, Too," "Blow at High Dough" and "Courage." The musical was developed in partnership with Theatre Aquarius and Thousand Islands Playhouse, with further development at The Creative School Chrysalis at Toronto Metropolitan University and the National Arts Centre's National Creation Fund. It's a Good Life If You Don't Weaken had its world premiere at Theatre Aquarius in Hamilton, Ontario, on April 22, 2026.

In 2026, Rubinoff produced the Montreal premiere of Grow, a musical by Matt Murray, Colleen Dauncey and Akiva Romer-Segal about two Amish sisters who leave their community and find work in an urban cannabis dispensary. The production ran at the Segal Centre for Performing Arts from May 24 to June 14, 2026.

=== Canadian Music Theatre Project ===
While he was an associate dean, Sheridan College transitioned the music theatre performance program from a three-year diploma to a four-year bachelor's degree. This prompted Rubinoff to establish the Canadian Music Theatre Project (CMTP). The CMTP pays musical theatre composers and book writers to further develop their musical with the fourth-year students of the musical theatre program. As part of the program, they receive a reading, a staged workshop presentation, and a demo recording.

The first musical that was developed under this program was Come from Away, which has gone on to be a critical and box office success internationally. The musical was conceived by Rubinoff and written by Irene Sankoff and David Hein.

Since then, Rubinoff and CMTP have helped develop approximately 30 new musicals. Some other notable works developed by CMTP include The Theory of Relativity (2012), Brantwood (2015), Grow (2016), Kelly v. Kelly (2018), Maggie (2019), and Almost a Full Moon (2020).

In April 2021, Rubinoff resigned from his position with CMTP and Sheridan College. The CMTP has since been inactive.

=== The Musical Stage Company ===
In the spring of 2025, Rubinoff was named the Artistic Director of The Musical Stage Company, a Canadian charitable organization dedicated to the development of original Canadian musicals.

== Other roles ==
Rubinoff has held several leadership positions in the Canadian theatre and arts community. He served as the inaugural co-chair of the National Centre for New Musicals at Theatre Aquarius, and was president of the Toronto Alliance for the Performing Arts (TAPA) and chair of its Commercial Theatre Development Fund. He was also a member of the 2015 Governor General's Canadian Leadership Conference.

== Theatre credits ==
- 2002: A Chorus Line – produced and presented in Toronto
- 2003: Evita – produced and presented in Toronto
- 2003: This Is Our Youth – co-produced with the Canadian Stage Company in Toronto
- 2006: Boygroove – produced and presented in Toronto
- 2007: Evil Dead: The Musical – produced and presented in Toronto
- 2007: Jewtopia
- 2009: Dog Sees God: Confessions of a Teenage Blockhead – produced and presented in Toronto
- 2010: Love, Loss, and What I Wore – produced and presented in Toronto
- 2013: Come from Away – 1 Tony Award, 3 Drama Desk Awards, 3 Olivier Awards
- 2014: The Theory of Relativity – premiered at Goodspeed Musicals
- 2022: Grow – premiered at the Grand Theatre
- 2022: Almost a Full Moon – premiered at the Citadel Theatre
- 2023: Kelly v. Kelly – premiered at the Berkeley Street Theatre with the Canadian Stage Company
- 2023: Maggie – premiered at Theatre Aquarius
- 2024: The Last Timbit – premiered at the Elgin Theatre
- 2026: It's a Good Life If You Don't Weaken – premiered at Theatre Aquarius
- 2026: Grow – Montreal premiere at the Segal Centre for Performing Arts

== Honours and awards ==
At the 2017 Tony Awards, Rubinoff was nominated for a Tony Award as a producer of Come from Away, which was nominated for Best Musical.

In 2017, Rubinoff was named a Canadian of the Year by the Canadian Club of Toronto.

At the 2019 Laurence Olivier Awards, Rubinoff received an Olivier Award as a producer of Come from Away, which won Best New Musical.

In 2023, Rubinoff was awarded the Meritorious Service Cross by the governor general of Canada for his work in conceiving and developing the musical, Come from Away.
