= The Day the World Came to Town =

2002 book by Jim DeFede

The Day the World Came to Town: 9/11 in Gander, Newfoundland
- Author: Jim DeFede
- Language: English
- Genre: Nonfiction
- Publisher: HarperCollins
- Publication date: 14 August 2003 (paperback)
- Publication place: United States
- Media type: Print, ebook, audiobook
- Pages: 244 pp
- ISBN: 978-0060559717

The Day the World Came to Town: 9/11 in Gander, Newfoundland is a 2002 oral history of the small town of Gander, Newfoundland and Labrador, Canada in the wake of the September 11 attacks written by journalist Jim DeFede It is the first book authored by DeFede.

== Background ==
In 2001, Gander International Airport played an integral role in world aviation in the hours immediately following the September 11 attacks when all of North America's airspace was closed by Transport Canada and the United States Federal Aviation Administration (FAA). As part of Operation Yellow Ribbon, 42 planes were diverted to Gander. DeFede moved to Gander for two months after the September 11 attacks to research the story.

== Synopsis ==
The Day the World Came to Town opens with a history of the town and an explanation of the strategic military and commercial importance of Gander International Airport. On September 11, DeFede reports that Gander, with a population of approximately 10,000, accepted 38 previously unscheduled planes carrying approximately 6,800 passengers and crew, most of whom were stranded there until U.S. airspace reopened nearly a week later.

From The Newport Beach Independent:

"In what is, I’m sure, one of the few truly uplifting volumes about 9/11, we meet the ordinary folks, who on a moments notice transformed their town into a giant shelter to welcome the “plane people.”

Ganderites offered their cars, food, showers, and beds to the strangers who would soon become honorary “Newfies.”

== Reception ==
DeFede won the 2003 Christopher Award for his work on The Day the World Came to Town.

== See also ==
- Diverted, 2009 TV mini-series
- Come from Away, 2017 musical
  - Come from Away, 2021 musical film
- You Are Here, 2018 documentary film
