= Maggie (Reid musical) =

Musical by Johnny Reid

- Production artwork
- Music: Johnny Reid; Matt Murray; Bob Foster
- Lyrics: Johnny Reid; Matt Murray
- Book: Johnny Reid; Matt Murray
- Setting: Lanarkshire, Scotland
- Premiere: April 19, 2023: Theatre Aquarius, Hamilton, Ontario

Maggie is a musical with music by Johnny Reid, Matt Murray and Bob Foster, and book and lyrics by Reid and Murray. It is based on the true story of Reid's grandmother, Maggie, a Scottish single mother living in the mining town of Lanarkshire, Scotland between 1954 and 1976.

== Premise ==
Set in Lanark, Scotland, the events in the musical takes place over two decades, from 1954 to 1976. Maggie is a single mother struggling to raise her three sons, Shug, Tommy, and Wee Jimmy, following the death of her husband. In a post-war era, people are struggling to survive in a changing world, where many young people consider leaving Scotland to find work in other countries. The community rally around Maggie - as well as her friends Betty, Sadie, and Jean - who stay behind and fight through the hard times by holding on to love, family, friendship and humour.

== Development ==
Reid first began working on the musical in 2016, who worked on it with Matt Murray. The musical, which was initially known as My Bonnie Lass, was developed as part of the Canadian Music Theatre Project at Sheridan College, under the guidance of Canadian theatre producer Michael Rubinoff. In 2018, a forty-five minute staged reading was performed by Sheridan College students. It was then further expanded into a ninety-minute musical, which was performed by Sheridan College students in February 2019.

== Production history ==
Maggie premiered at Theatre Aquarius in Hamilton, Ontario, where it played between April 19 and May 6, 2023. It was directed by Mary Francis Moore with choreography by Yasmine Lee and music direction by Bob Foster. It starred Dharma Bizer in the title role as Maggie, who also played the role at the developmental workshop. Following this, the musical headlined the 2023 Charlottetown Festival and also played at the Savoy Theatre in Nova Scotia, with all of the cast reprising their roles.

The musical was further developed, which included a reworked script and staging. In 2024, Maggie received its American premiere at the Goodspeed Opera House. Performances began on August 23, 2024, and it closed on October 20, 2024. Moore returned as director, with choreography by EJ Boyle. Christine Dwyer starred as Maggie.

== Cast and characters ==
Role	Hamilton	Goodspeed
Role	2023	2024
Maggie	Dharma Bizier	Christine Dwyer
Betty	Nicola-Dawn Brook	Terra C. MacLeod
Sadie	Jamie McRoberts	Sophia Clarke
Jean	Michelle Bardach	Kennedy Caughell
Tommy	Will Lincoln	Wes Williams
Shug	Lawrence Libor	Jeffrey Kringer
Wee Jimmy	Aidan Burke	Sam Primack
Uncle Charles	Jeremy Legat	Ryan Duncan
Tam	Adam Stevenson	Matt Faucher

== Musical numbers ==
As of the 2024 Goodspeed Musicals production:

Act I

- "Overture" – Company
- "Friday Night in Lanark" – Betty, Sadie, Jean, Maggie, Ensemble
- "Unbreakable" – Big Jimmy
- "Friday Night in Lanark (reprise)" – Betty, Sadie, Jean, Maggie, Ensemble
- "Unbreakable (reprise)" – Big Jimmy
- "Right by You" – Maggie
- "Walk Away" – Maggie, Shug
- "Everyone's Gone" – Betty, Sadie, Jean, Maggie, Ensemble
- "Promised Land" – Tam, Shug, Ensemble
- "Gettin' Outta Here" – Tommy, Shug, Ensemble
- "Lang May Yer Lum Reek" – Geordie, Charles, Sadie, Ensemble
- "My Confession" – Maggie, Ensemble

Act II

- "Entr'acte" – Company
- "Friday Night in Lanark (reprise)" – Sadie, Betty
- "Livin' It Up" – Charles, Ensemble
- "Walk Away (reprise)" – Shug
- "Everyone's Gone (reprise)" – Teresa, Wee Jimmy
- "Used To be Fire" – Maggie
- "What You're Looking For" – Maggie
- "Queen For a Day" – Sadie, Betty, Maggie, Jean, Ensemble
- "All Because of You" – Wee Jimmy
- "Unbreakable (reprise)" – Maggie, Ensemble

=== Studio cast recording ===
A studio cast recording was released digitally in 2023, which included the cast of the Sheridan College developmental workshop.

No.	Title	Performer(s)	Length
1.	"I Love A Lassie"	Will Lincoln	1:55
2.	"Friday Night in Lanark"	Dharma Bizier, Juliette Jones, Mikayla Stradiotto, Megan Dallan	4:14
3.	"Right By You"	Bizier	3:08
4.	"Walk Away"	Bizier, Liam Crober-Best	2:25
5.	"Everyone's Gone"	Jones, Bizier, Stradiotto, Dallan	3:54
6.	"Promised Land"	Ensemble	2:14
7.	"Gettin' Outta Here"	Lincoln, Crober-Best	3:41
8.	"My Confession"	Bizier	3:24
9.	"Beautiful Sunday"	Ensemble	2:59
10.	"How This Story Ends"	Aidan Burke, Kirsten Kwong	3:14
11.	"Used To Be Fire"	Bizier	3:35
12.	"Queen For A Day"	Stradiotto, Jones, Dallan, Bizier	4:00
13.	"What You're Looking For"	Bizier	3:35
14.	"All Because Of You"	Burke	2:38
Total length:			45:03

== Critical reception ==
The premiere production in Hamilton received positive reviews. Aisling Murphy of Intermission Magazine drew a parallel between this early production of Maggie and early versions of Come from Away, suggesting it could go on to have similar success. Though Murphy pointed out that it could use some structural reworking to be more cohesive, she said it could be on its way to becoming "Canada's next musical theatre phenomenon." Glenn Sumi similarly praised the musical's "big, generous heart" but said that the book could use further refining.

The Goodspeed Musicals production received positive reviews. Writing for The Hamilton Spectator, Gary Smith noted that it was now a much more sophisticated and fully fleshed production that had improved its dramaturgy. In his positive review, Smith praised Christine Dwyer's performance, the new songs and script revisions, and the show's transformation into a leaner and more emotionally impactful production.Berkshire on Stage's Mark Auerbach similarly praised Dwyer's powerhouse performance in the title role and production elements. Auerbach also noted Goodspeed's commitment to new musicals that go on to Broadway, and suggested that it may have potential for a larger future beyond its current run. Fred Sokol of Talkin' Broadway said the musical, which is equally uplifting and heartbreaking, is "Broadway ready".
