= Astrid Van Wieren =

Canadian stage actress

- Education: University of Western Ontario; Ryerson Theatre School

Astrid Van Wieren (born 1964 or 1965) is a Canadian stage actress.

== Early life and education ==
Van Wieren is originally from London, Ontario. She was born to a "literary mother" and "theatre loving father," and has several sisters and a brother. She became interested in performance from a young age. She attended King’s College at University of Western Ontario, where she studied English and French, graduating in 1988. She went on to attend Ryerson Theatre School.

== Career ==
After graduating from Ryerson, Van Wieren "always said 'yes' to any project," leading her to become involve with a number of "new plays, early fringe and wonderful edgy stuff". She has acted in both musicals and plays.

In 2015, Van Wieren originated the role of Beulah in Come From Away, and was part of the show's original Broadway cast beginning in 2017. Van Wieren also performed in the production's 2021 pro-shot, and joined a production of the show in Gander, Newfoundland and Labrador, in 2023.

In June 2018, Van Wieren hosted the Dora Awards in Toronto.

In 2019, Van Wieren co-wrote the script for a film, The River You Step In, with Jon Michaelson. She also starred as the film's protagonist, a social worker named Stevie.

=== Theatre roles ===
Year	Show	Role	Location/Company	Type	Ref
2001	Mamma Mia!	Ensemble		North American Tour	
	BAAL – A Rock n Roll Play	Baal	Buddies in Bad Times	Regional	
2008	Foto	Hania			
2011	This Wide Night	Lorraine			
2013	Sucker	Constance			
2014	The Way Back to Thursday		Theatre Passe Muraille	Regional	
2014	Ubu Mayor: A Harmful Bit of Fun	Huhu	One Little Goat Theatre Company	Regional	
2014	Belles Soeurs: The Musical	Germaine Lauzon	Segal Centre	Regional	
2015	Myth of the Ostrich	Holly	Offside Productions	Regional	
2015	Come From Away	Beulah and others	La Jolla Playhouse	Regional	
2016	Come From Away	Beulah and others	Ford's Theatre Society	Regional	
2017-2022	Come From Away	Beulah and others		Broadway	
2023	Inge(new) – In search of a musical			Regional	
2023	Come From Away	Diane and others	Joseph R Smallwood Arts & Culture Centre	Regional	

== Personal life ==
Van Wieren is based in Leslieville, Toronto, and also has an apartment in Harlem, New York City.

== Awards and nominations ==
Year	Awards	Category	Show	Role	Result	Ref
2012	Dora Mavor Moore Awards	Outstanding Performance by a Female in a Principal Role (Independent Theatre)	This Wide Night		Won	
2016	Gypsy Rose Lee Awards	Excellence in Performance as an Ensemble	Come From Away	Beulah and others	Won	
2017	Dora Mavor Moore Awards	Best Leading Actress (Musical Theatre)	Come From Away	Beulah and others	Nominated	
