= Irene Sankoff =

Canadian librettist and composer

- Born: North York, Ontario, Canada
- Education: York University
- Occupations: Librettist, composer
- Notable work: Come from Away
- Spouse: David Hein

Irene Sankoff is a Canadian librettist and composer–lyricist, best known for co-writing the Broadway musical Come from Away with her writing partner and husband, David Hein.

== Life and career ==
Sankoff was born in North York, Ontario, and double-majored in psychology and creative writing at York University, where she met Hein. After graduating, the couple moved to New York City in 1999 where he worked at a music studio and she studied at the Actors Studio and performed in theatres. They were in New York City during the September 11 attacks.

After spending several years studying and working in New York the couple returned to Toronto where Hein wrote a song, "My Mother's Lesbian Jewish Wiccan Wedding", about his mother and her later life partner. Sankoff and Hein expanded the song into a play that became a hit at the Toronto Fringe Festival in 2009 and then picked up by Mirvish Productions for a run at Toronto's Panasonic Theatre before touring Canada.

As a result of My Mother’s Lesbian Jewish Wiccan Wedding's success, theatre producer Michael Rubinoff approached Hein and Sankoff with his idea about a show based on Operation Yellow Ribbon in which residents of Gander, Newfoundland, housed 7,000 airline passengers who had been stranded at Gander Airport as a result of the grounding of all North American air flights following the September 11 attacks. The couple visited Gander in 2011 during the 10-year reunion of passengers and locals, and subsequently wrote Come from Away based on the stories they learned there.

== Awards ==
Sankoff and Hein won two Drama Desk awards, one for Outstanding Musical and one for Outstanding Book of a Musical, for Come from Away in 2017. That same year, they were nominated for the Drama Desk Award for Outstanding Lyrics. They were also nominated for the 2017 Tony Awards Best Book of a Musical and Best Original Score. Come From Away also won the award for Outstanding Achievement in Music at the 2019 Laurence Olivier Awards. In 2023, Sankoff and Hein were awarded honorary doctorates by Memorial University of Newfoundland.
