= Kelly Devine =

Choreographer

- Born: Kelly Devine
- Occupations: Dance artist, choreographer

Kelly Devine is a theatre choreographer.

Her Broadway choreography credits include Rock of Ages, Rocky, Doctor Zhivago, Come from Away and Escape to Margaritaville. She was associate choreographer on Memphis and Jersey Boys.

In 2018, she choreographed the Off-Broadway musical Clueless.

She won the 2019 Laurence Olivier Award for Best Choreography for her work on the West End production of Come from Away.
