= North Atlantic Aviation Museum =

Aviation museum in Newfoundland and Labrador, Canada

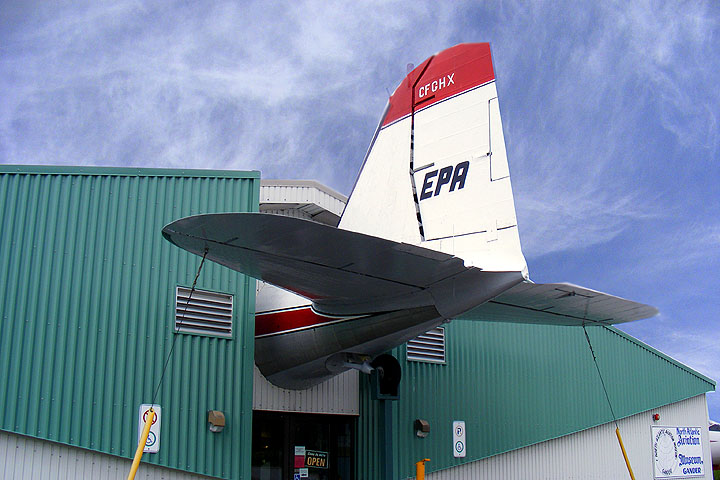
- Established: 1985
- Location: Gander, Newfoundland and Labrador, Canada.
- Coordinates: 48.952423°N 54.622791°W
- Type: Aviation Museum
- Website: North Atlantic Aviation Museum

The North Atlantic Aviation Museum is an aviation museum located in the town of Gander, Newfoundland and Labrador, Canada.

== History ==
The association to establish the museum was formed in 1985 and the museum opened to the public in 1996.

The museum contains 4 primary sections; the construction of Gander International Airport and Gander's involvement in World War II, particularly with regards to RAF Ferry Command. Second is a section regarding International and transatlantic civilian travel. Next is a section on Eastern Provincial Airways as well as international flights from Eastern Bloc nations, the Soviet Union and Cuba. Finally, there is a section on Gander's participation during 9/11 when over 6700 passengers were rerouted to Gander International Airport, with a steel beam from the World Trade Center on permanent display. Various other displays and artifacts are scattered around the museum, including an operational Rolls-Royce Merlin engine produced by Packard, a Link Trainer, a de Havilland Tiger Moth and the oldest known mercury barometer in Newfoundland.

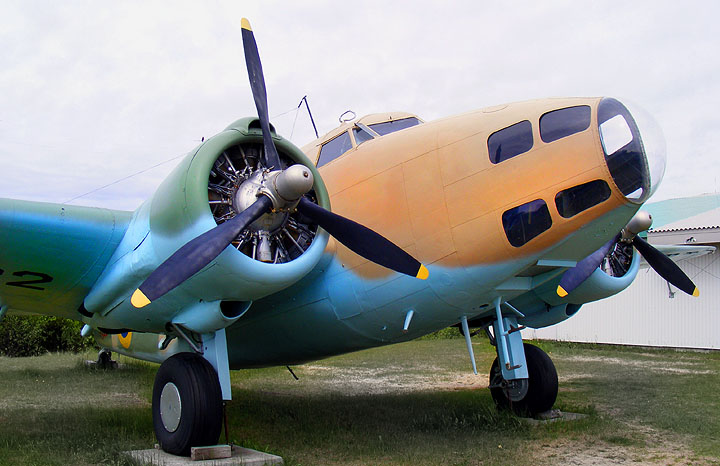
Lockheed Hudson

Aviation has played a crucial role in the development of Gander. The original airport, then known as the Newfoundland Airport, was completed in 1938 with the first landing on January 11 of that year. It was a major refueling stop for transatlantic flights starting during the Second World War (RAF Ferry Command and later RAF Transport Command) and continuing until the increased range of commercial jetliners eliminated the need for refueling. Gander earned the nickname "Crossroads of the world" at the height of its civil aviation role. Gander was used for test flights of Concorde starting in 1974. On September 11, 2001, Gander played host to 6700 people stranded on redirected and rerouted US-bound international flights.

== Aircraft collection ==
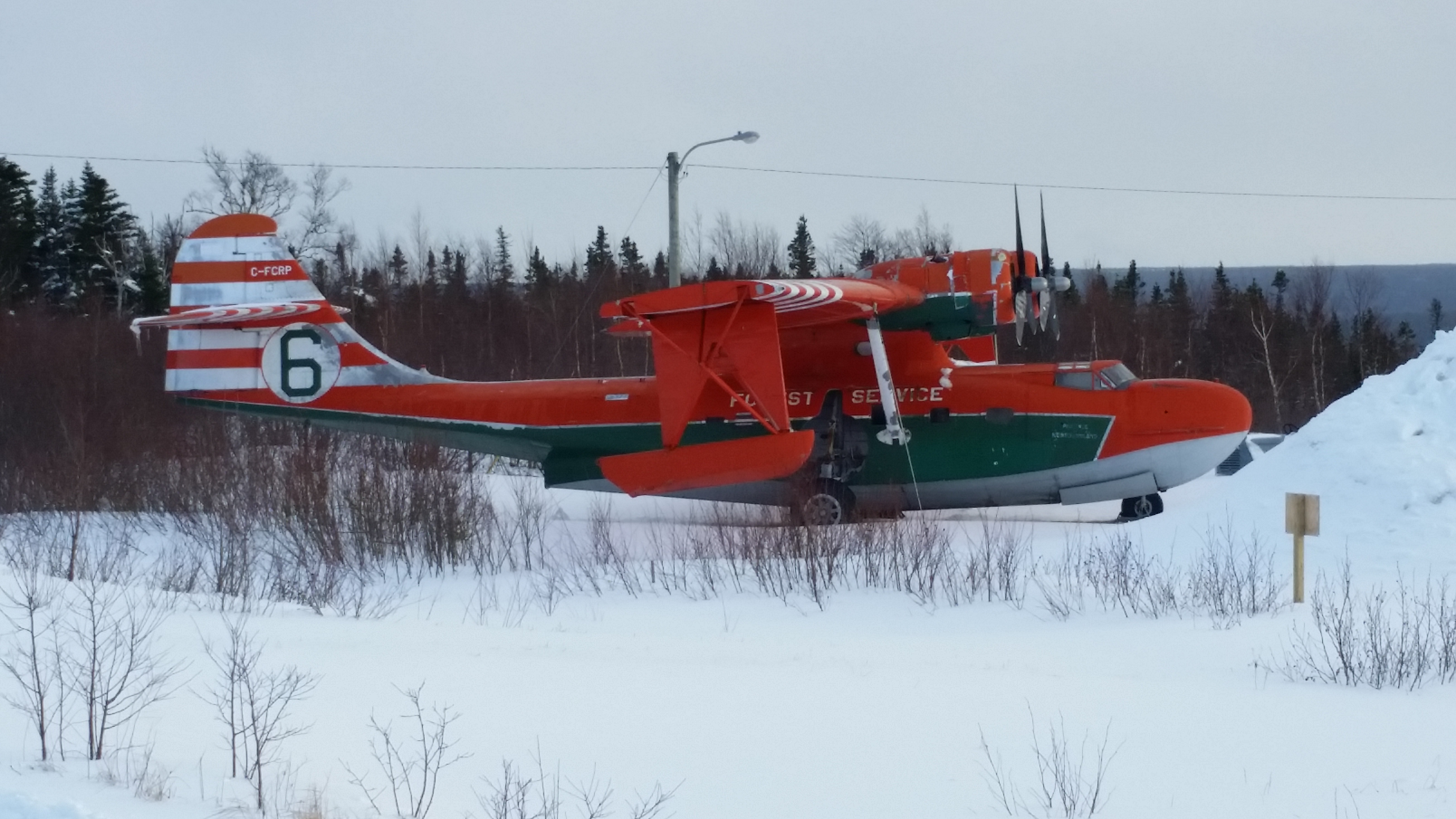
Canadian Forest Service Consolidated PBY Catalina

The museum's static displays include: an F-101 Voodoo, a Lockheed Hudson, a "Canso" waterbomber (derived from the PBY Catalina), a de Havilland Tiger Moth, and a Beechcraft Model 18-S. In the front of the building the tail of a 1930s-era Douglas DC-4 was used as an awning, but has since been removed. The cockpit of the same plane is located on the back of the building and can be accessed from inside.

== Affiliations ==
The museum is affiliated with: CMA, CHIN, and Virtual Museum of Canada.

== See also ==
- List of aerospace museums
