= You Are Here (2018 film) =

2018 Canadian made-for-television documentary film

- Film poster
- Also known as: You Are Here: A Come From Away Story
- Directed by: Moze Mossanen
- Music by: Laurel MacDonald; Phil Strong
- Country of origin: Canada
- Original language: English

Production
- Producer: Peter Gentile
- Cinematography: Stephen Chung; Ian Kerr
- Editors: Cathy Gulkin; Mikey Lalonde
- Running time: 84 minutes
- Production company: MDF Productions

Original release
- Network: HBO Canada
- Release: September 11, 2018

You Are Here: A Come from Away Story is a 2018 Canadian documentary film, directed by Moze Mossanen, focusing on the role of Gander, Newfoundland and Labrador in helping international air travellers stranded after the closure of North American airspace due to the September 11 attacks. The film profiles some of the real people who were portrayed in the 2013 stage musical Come from Away.

The film premiered on HBO Canada and Crave on September 11, 2018, and was the channel's highest-rated broadcast of 2018. It received follow-up screenings at selected film festivals, winning the Audience Choice Award for Best Documentary at the Cinéfest Sudbury International Film Festival in Sudbury, Ontario.

== Awards ==
At the 7th Canadian Screen Awards in 2019, the film won two Canadian Screen Awards, for Best Documentary Program and Best Editing in a Documentary Program (Cathy Gulkin), and received three other nominations for Best Visual Research (Elizabeth Klinck and Mike Lalonde), Best Music in a Non-Fiction Program or Series (Laurel MacDonald and Phil Strong) and Best Sound in a Non-Fiction Program or Series (Dave Rose, Christian Cooke, Colin McLellan, Dustin Harris, Steve Blair, Ian McGettigan, David Hocs).

== See also ==
- The Day the World Came to Town, 2002 book
- Diverted, 2009 TV mini-series
- Come from Away, 2017 musical
  - Come from Away, 2021 musical film
