= David Hein =

Canadian composer, librettist and actor

David Hein is a Canadian librettist, composer-lyricist, musician, and actor best known for co-writing the Broadway musical Come from Away with his writing partner and wife, Irene Sankoff.

Hein was born in Regina, Saskatchewan, and was educated at Lisgar Collegiate Institute in Ottawa and York University in Toronto, Ontario. After graduating, he and his fiancée moved to New York City in 1999 where he worked at a music studio and she studied at the Actors Studio. After spending several years studying and working in New York the couple returned to Toronto where Hein wrote a song "My Mother's Lesbian Jewish Wiccan Wedding", about his mother and her later life partner, which he and Sankoff expanded into a play that was staged at the Toronto Fringe Festival in 2009 and then picked up by Mirvish Productions for a run at Toronto's Panasonic Theatre before touring Canada.

As a result of My Mother’s Lesbian Jewish Wiccan Wedding's success, theatre producer Michael Rubinoff approached Hein and Sankoff with his idea about a show based on Operation Yellow Ribbon in which residents of Gander, Newfoundland, housed 7,000 airline passengers who had been stranded at Gander Airport as a result of the grounding of all North American air flights following the September 11 attacks, which became the musical Come from Away.

Following the success of Come from Away, in 2023 Sankoff and Hein were awarded honorary doctorates by Memorial University of Newfoundland.

He wrote the book for the musical Waking Ned Devine, which is expected to premiere at the Lyric Theatre, Belfast in February 2027.
