= Come from Away =

Musical first produced in 2013

- Music: Irene Sankoff; David Hein
- Lyrics: Irene Sankoff; David Hein
- Book: Irene Sankoff; David Hein
- Setting: Gander, Newfoundland, September 11–15, 2001
- Basis: Operation Yellow Ribbon
- Productions: 2017 Broadway; 2018 North American tour 2019 West End; 2023 US tour 2024 UK tour Various international productions
- Awards: Drama Desk Award for Outstanding Musical; Drama Desk Award for Outstanding Book of a Musical; Laurence Olivier Award for Best New Musical; Laurence Olivier Award for Outstanding Achievement in Music

Come from Away is a musical, with book, music and lyrics by Irene Sankoff and David Hein. It is based on the events in the Newfoundland town of Gander during the week following the September 11 attacks, when 38 planes, carrying approximately 7,000 passengers, were ordered to land unexpectedly at Gander International Airport. The characters in the musical are based on actual Gander residents and the stranded travelers they housed and fed.

After a successful pre-Broadway run, it opened on Broadway at the Gerald Schoenfeld Theatre on March 12, 2017, and became a critical and box office success. A live recording of the production was released on September 10, 2021, on the eve of the 20th anniversary of the attacks. The Broadway production closed on October 2, 2022, after playing 25 previews and 1,669 regular performances. It has had successful runs in several countries, including playing 1,048 performances in the West End in London.

At the 71st Tony Awards, the musical was nominated for seven awards, including Best Musical, Best Original Score, Best Book of a Musical and Best Featured Actress in a Musical for Jenn Colella, winning for Best Direction of a Musical for Christopher Ashley. At the 2019 Laurence Olivier Awards, it was nominated for nine awards and won three, including Best New Musical.

== Inception and development ==
The show was conceived by Michael Rubinoff, a Toronto lawyer, theatre producer, and associate dean of visual and performing arts at Sheridan College in Oakville. After being turned down by several writers, he reached out to husband and wife team Irene Sankoff and David Hein after seeing their 2009 show My Mother's Lesbian Jewish Wiccan Wedding. Sankoff and Hein, who had been living in New York during the September 11 attacks, did not find the concept bizarre, and felt that the idea of telling a Canadian story was inspiring.

In 2011, Sankoff and Hein visited Gander on the tenth anniversary of the attacks and spent almost a month interviewing people. Rubinoff used their initial script to produce a 45-minute workshop version for the Canadian Music Theatre Project in 2012. It was the first show developed there. The workshop was sufficiently successful that Rubinoff asked Sankoff and Hein to finish writing it for a full production at Sheridan in 2013. The full production, directed by Brian Hill, was an artistic success, but Rubinoff was unable to attract a Canadian producer for further development.

In 2013, Goodspeed Musicals included Come from Away in their workshop program, and the National Alliance for Musical Theatre in New York selected it as a showcase presentation, where its performance led to the show being optioned by Junkyard Dog Productions, the production company behind Memphis.

Come from Away is a 100-minute, one-act musical. Every event in the show is based on a real event, but Sankoff and Hein gathered more stories than could be included. The characters are "a tribute" to the real people portrayed, but "not necessarily them".

== Synopsis ==
On the morning of September 11, 2001, the townspeople of Gander describe life in Newfoundland and how they learn of the September 11 attacks on the radio ("Welcome to the Rock"). Claude, the mayor of Gander, is informed of the attacks by Janice, a new reporter in town, while at a local Tim Hortons. The town receives the news that the US airspace has been closed, causing US-bound flights to be diverted across Canada, including 38 to Gander International Airport ("38 Planes"). This nearly doubles the population of Gander, and the townspeople make preparations to care for the 7,000 stranded passengers. Beulah and Annette, two schoolteachers, prepare the local school to take in passengers, while Janice asks for the community to provide resources ("Blankets and Bedding").

For hours, the plane passengers are forbidden from leaving the planes, and are without information about the attacks. They express frustration and fear at being stranded. A Gander SPCA worker, Bonnie, goes into the plane holds to search for animals on the planes, and Claude reaches an agreement with Garth, a union leader, to pause the bus drivers' strike and transport passengers ("28 Hours/Wherever We Are"). The passengers are eventually transported to Gander and surrounding towns for shelter ("Darkness and Trees"). A Muslim passenger, Ali, is temporarily detained. The local bus drivers take passengers to the towns and explain the culture of Newfoundland while navigating language barriers with international passengers ("On the Bus"/"Darkness and Trees (reprise)"). The passengers learn why they were grounded and watch replays of the attacks on television ("Lead Us Out of the Night"). They attempt to contact their families ("Phoning Home") and experience disorientation and stress at their situation ("Costume Party").

The town tries to manage food, sanitation, and other necessities for the guests. Some of the passengers try to get home, but are informed by Oz, the constable of Gander, that travel to the US takes several days. Nick, a British passenger, and Diane, a Texan, go for a walk with a gay couple from Los Angeles, both named Kevin. Bonnie and her husband Doug discover two rare bonobo chimpanzees in the hold of a plane. An American, Bob, is asked to take grills from backyards to set up for a community cookout; he fears he will be shot for stealing, but he finds everyone is friendly and willing to help. Hannah, the mother of a New York firefighter, bonds with Beulah and worries about her son ("I Am Here"). Many of the passengers of various religious beliefs go to a local Catholic church or other spaces around town to pray ("Prayer"). Ethnic and national tensions erupt among the passengers and townsfolk ("On the Edge"). To alleviate this, the passengers are invited to a local bar and some are initiated as honorary Newfoundlanders ("Heave Away"/"Screech In"). One pilot who has been diverted, Beverley, reflects on her experience as the first female captain for American Airlines ("Me and the Sky").

The planes prepare to leave, and Ali is subjected to a strip search prior to leaving on suspicion he may be a terrorist. When flights are delayed, Nick and Diane go for a walk around the town and realize they will miss each other when they leave Gander ("The Dover Fault"/"Stop the World"). When the planes are cleared for takeoff, the passengers express happiness at returning to the US, and set up a donation fund for the people of Gander ("38 Planes" (reprise)"/"Somewhere in the Middle of Nowhere"). After the events of the last five days, both the townspeople and passengers experience loneliness and fear about the state of the world; the two Kevins' relationship has fallen apart due to the stress of the crisis, and Hannah is devastated to learn her son has died ("Something's Missing").

Ten years after the attacks, the townspeople and the passengers reunite in Gander (including Diane and Nick, who have since married) and celebrate the relationships formed while the passengers were stranded ("Ten Years Later"/"Finale").

== Characters and casts ==
| Roles | San Diego | Seattle | Washington, D.C. | Toronto | Broadway | Canada | North American tour | West End | UK Tour |
| Roles | 2015 | | 2016 | | 2017 | 2018 | | 2019 | 2024/2025 |
|---|---|---|---|---|---|---|---|---|---|
| Bonnie & others | Petrina Bromley | Petrina Bromley | Alyssa Wilmoth Keegan | Petrina Bromley | Petrina Bromley | Kristen Peace | Megan McGinnis | Mary Doherty | Rosie Glossop |
| Oz & others | Geno Carr | Eric Ankrim | Geno Carr | Geno Carr | Geno Carr | Cory O'Brien | Harter Clingman | Harry Morrison | Oliver Jacobson |
| Beverley/Annette & others | Jenn Colella | Jenn Colella | Jenn Colella | Jenn Colella | Jenn Colella | Eliza-Jane Scott | Becky Gulsvig | Rachel Tucker | Sara Poyzer |
| Claude & others | Joel Hatch | Joel Hatch | Joel Hatch | Joel Hatch | Joel Hatch | George Masswohl | Kevin Carolan | Clive Carter | Nicolas Pound |
| Bob & others | Rodney Hicks | Rodney Hicks | Rodney Hicks | Rodney Hicks | Rodney Hicks | Kevin Vidal | James Earl Jones II | Nathanael Campbell | Dale Mathurin |
| Janice & others | Allison Spratt Pearce | Kendra Kassebaum | Kendra Kassebaum | Kendra Kassebaum | Kendra Kassebaum | Steffi DiDomenicantonio | Emily Walton | Emma Salvo | Natasha J. Barnes |
| Kevin T./Garth & others | Chad Kimball | Chad Kimball | Chad Kimball | Chad Kimball | Chad Kimball | Jack Noseworthy | Andrew Samonsky | David Shannon | Mark Dugdale |
| Nick/Doug & others | Lee MacDougall | Lee MacDougall | Lee MacDougall | Lee MacDougall | Lee MacDougall | James Kall | Chamblee Ferguson | Robert Hands | Daniel Crowder |
| Kevin J./Ali & others | Caesar Samayoa | Caesar Samayoa | Caesar Samayoa | Caesar Samayoa | Caesar Samayoa | Ali Momen | Nick Duckart | Jonathan Andrew Hume | Jamal Zulfiqar |
| Hannah & others | Q. Smith | Q. Smith | Q. Smith | Q. Smith | Q. Smith | Saccha Dennis | Danielle K. Thomas | Cat Simmons | Bree Smith |
| Beulah & others | Astrid Van Wieren | Astrid Van Wieren | Astrid Van Wieren | Astrid Van Wieren | Astrid Van Wieren | Lisa Horner | Julie Johnson | Jenna Boyd | Amanda Henderson |
| Diane & others | Sharon Wheatley | Sharon Wheatley | Sharon Wheatley | Sharon Wheatley | Sharon Wheatley | Barbara Fulton | Christine Toy Johnson | Helen Hobson | Kirsty Hoiles |

=== Notable cast replacements ===
- Broadway (2017–2022)
  - Nick/Doug & others: Jim Walton
  - Beverley/Annette & others: Becky Gulsvig, Rachel Tucker
- North American tours (2019–2025)
  - Janice & others: Steffi DiDomenicantonio, Julia Knitel
- London (2019–2023)
  - Kevin T./Garth & others: Mark Dugdale,David Thaxton
  - Beverley/Annette & others: Alice Fearn

== Musical numbers ==
- "Welcome to the Rock" – Company
- "38 Planes" – Company
- "Blankets and Bedding" – Company
- "28 Hours/Wherever We Are" – Company
- "Darkness and Trees" – Company
- "On the Bus" † – Company
- "Darkness and Trees" (reprise) † – Company
- "Lead Us Out of the Night" † – Company
- "Phoning Home" † – Company
- "Costume Party" – Diane, Hannah, Kevin T., Kevin J., company
- "I Am Here" – Hannah
- "Prayer" – Kevin T., company
- "On the Edge" – Company
- "In the Bar/Heave Away" † – Company
- "Screech In" – Claude, Company
- "Me and the Sky" – Beverley, women
- "The Dover Fault" † – Nick, Diane
- "Stop the World" – Nick, Diane, company
- "38 Planes" (reprise)†/"Somewhere in the Middle of Nowhere" – Beverley, Company
- "Something's Missing" – Company
- "10 Years Later" † – Company
- "Finale" – Company
- "Screech Out" † – Band

† Not listed on the show's Playbill, but included on the cast recording

== Productions ==
=== Pre-Broadway tryouts (2015–2017) ===
Come from Away had its first professional production in 2015. It premiered at the La Jolla Playhouse in San Diego as a co-production with the Seattle Repertory Theatre, where it was directed by Christopher Ashley and choreographed by Kelly Devine. Its first preview was on May 29, 2015, with an opening night on June 11, 2015 and an initial closing date of July 5, 2015. It was "a hit", and was extended twice until July 12, 2015. The production was nominated for eight Craig Noel Awards and won six. The musical then played at the Seattle Repertory Theatre, where it began performances on November 13, 2015. Examiner.com reported that Come From Away "set an all-time record for single ticket sales in a 24-hour period at Seattle Rep" as of December 1, 2015, and the managing director of Seattle Rep said it was "now officially the highest grossing work that the theatre has ever done in its 53-year history". It was extended by a week and closed December 20, 2015.

Come from Away began performances at Ford's Theatre in Washington, D.C., on September 2, 2016. It was set to close on October 9, 2016, but was extended through October 16. The production was nominated for 14 Helen Hayes Awards and won 4, including Outstanding Production. Later in October, the cast played two concert performances in Gander at the Steele Community Centre. It played a final pre-Broadway engagement at the Royal Alexandra Theatre in Toronto, beginning performances on November 15, 2016. The show's entire run sold out during the second week of performances, and the venue added 16 extra seats and one extra performance to try to meet the demand. The musical also set a ticket sales record for the theatre, selling $1.7 million in tickets in a single week. The show closed in Toronto on January 8, 2017.

=== Broadway (2017–2022) ===
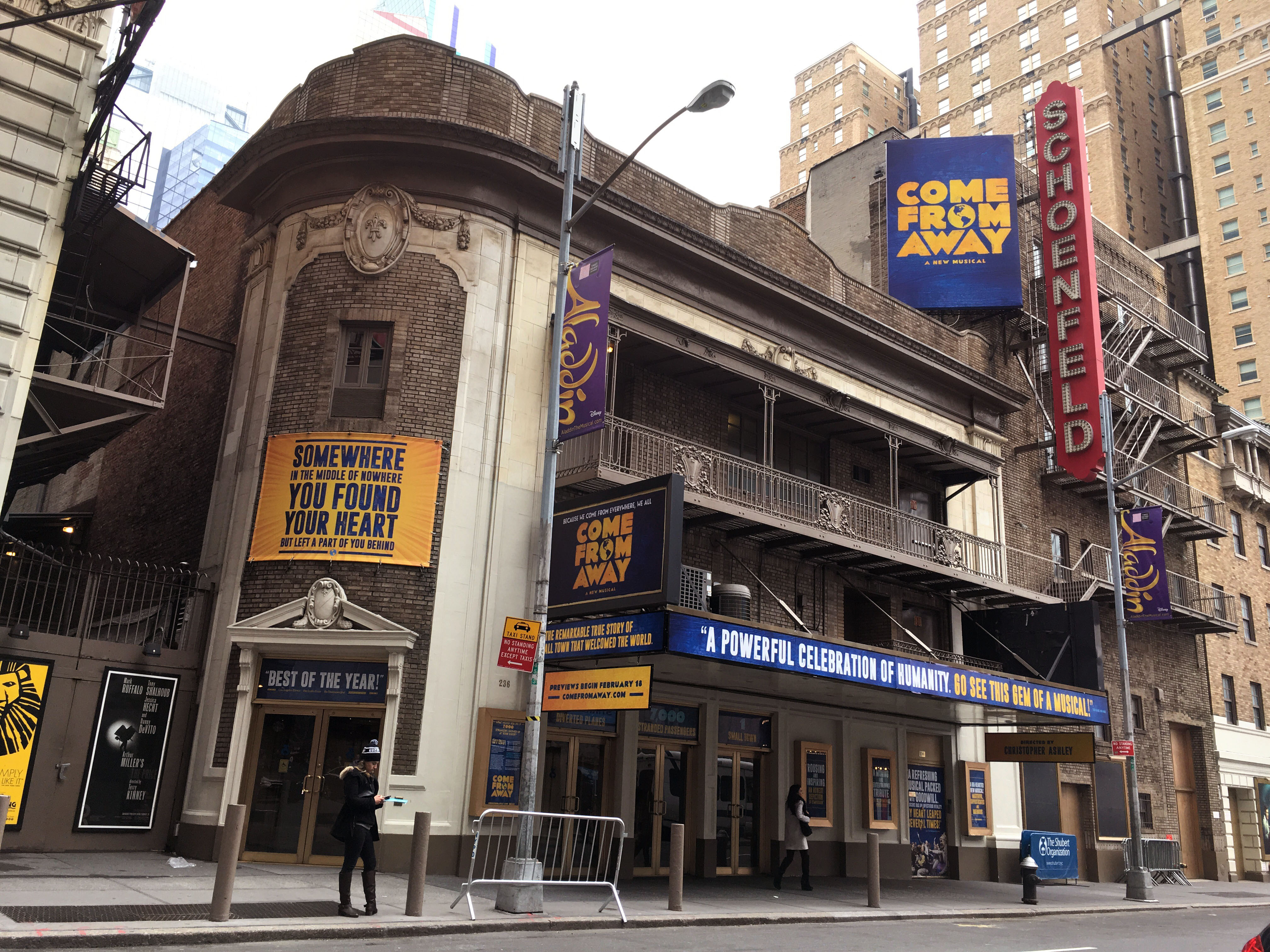
The Gerald Schoenfeld Theatre on Broadway during its run of Come from Away

Come from Away began previews on Broadway on February 18, 2017, at the Gerald Schoenfeld Theatre, and officially opened on March 12, 2017. Direction was by Christopher Ashley, choreography by Kelly Devine, scenic design by Beowulf Boritt, costume design by Toni-Leslie James, lighting design by Howell Binkley, sound design by Gareth Owen. Before the March 15, 2017, performance, Canadian Prime Minister Justin Trudeau gave a speech to the audience. At the 71st Tony Awards, Come From Away was nominated for seven Tonys, including Best Musical. It won one, Best Direction for Christopher Ashley. The show was reported to have a $12 million capitalization, and recouped in about eight months.

On March 12, 2020, Come from Away closed due to the COVID-19 Broadway lockdown. The show reopened on September 21, 2021, after a year and a half. During the closure, members of the company performed a free concert at the Lincoln Memorial to commemorate 20 years since the September 11 attacks. The show closed on October 2, 2022, after 25 previews and 1,669 regular performances. (Note: The June 21, 2022, performance was cancelled due to illness.)

=== Original Canadian production (2018–2021) ===
Following the success of the pre-Broadway engagement, Mirvish Productions announced they would be opening a Canadian production of Come from Away that would include an all-Canadian cast. The original Canadian production played an engagement in Winnipeg at the Royal Manitoba Theatre Centre between January 12 and February 3, 2018. The entire four-week run sold out before performances began. Following this, the production began performances at the Royal Alexandra Theatre in Toronto on February 13, 2018. It recouped its full capitalization in 14 weeks. The show ended its run at the Royal Alexandra Theatre on January 20, 2019. This allowed the production to move to the nearby Elgin Theatre, since Mirvish was staging Dear Evan Hansen at the Royal Alexandra Theatre in March 2019.

While the production was moved between theatres, the cast performed eight benefit concerts of the show at the Holy Heart Theatre in St. John's. The show opened at the Elgin Theatre on February 5, 2019. Following the early closure of Dear Evan Hansen, Come from Away closed at the Elgin Theatre on December 1, and again transferred back to the Royal Alexandra Theatre, where it resumed performances on December 13, 2019. The musical played there until March 2020, when Mirvish suspended all performances due to the COVID-19 pandemic. After a 21-month hiatus, Come from Away reopened at the Royal Alexandra Theatre on December 15, 2021. After a crew member tested positive for COVID, the show announced it would cancel four performances, planning to resume on December 28. Mirvish subsequently announced on December 27 that the production was closed permanently, citing pandemic-related financial difficulties. Its final performance was December 22, 2021.

=== North American tours (2018–2025) ===
Come from Away began a North American tour in October 2018 at the Capitol Theatre in Yakima, Washington, before officially opening at the 5th Avenue Theatre in Seattle, Washington later that month. The cast included Becky Gulsvig as Beverley/Annette & others, Kevin Carolan as Claude & others, and Megan McGinnis as Bonnie & others. The tour recouped in 19 weeks.

A non-union tour began on November 19, 2023, at the Alaska Center for the Performing Arts and closed May 9, 2025.

=== West End (2019–2023) ===
Come from Away played at the Abbey Theatre in Dublin from December 6, 2018, to January 19, 2019, prior to a transfer to London's West End. The cast included Rachel Tucker as Beverley/Annette & others, Clive Carter as Claude & others, and Cat Simmons as Hannah & others. It began performances at the Phoenix Theatre on January 30, 2019. Alice Fearn replaced Tucker in February 2020.

The production was halted on March 16, 2020 after new COVID restrictions were announced. It reopened on July 22, 2021, after 17 months of closure. The West End production closed on January 7, 2023, after 1,048 performances.

=== Australia (2019–2023) ===
An Australian production opened at the Comedy Theatre in Melbourne in July 2019. The cast included Nicholas Brown as Kevin J./Ali & others and Katrina Retallick as Diane & others. The production was affected by multiple lockdowns in Australia due to COVID-19. The company was planned to tour several cities in China, but the tour was canceled due to COVID-19. It has toured in Brisbane, Sydney, and Canberra, and broke box office records in both Melbourne and Canberra.

=== UK & Ireland tour (2024–2025) ===
A touring production of Come from Away began March 1, 2024, at the Curve Theatre in Leicester. The cast included Amanda Henderson as Beulah & others. The tour closed January 5, 2025.

=== Other productions ===
==== Europe ====
- A Swedish-language production played in Norrköping from September 26 to October 25, 2020, and in Linköping from November 20, 2020, to January 9, 2021, at the Östgöta Theatre.
- A Dutch production premiered at the Luxor Theater in Rotterdam on November 18, 2021. The cast included Willemijn Verkaik as Beverley/Annette & others. It ran until June 6, 2022.
- A production ran at the Tampere Workers' Theatre in Finland from September 21 to December 31, 2022.
- A Danish production opened October 21, 2022 at Fredericia Musicalteater, and was nominated for a Reumert Award.
- A French-language production was staged at Festival Bruxellons in Brussels in the summer of 2024.
- A Spanish-language production took place at the Teatro Marquina in Madrid, beginning September 12, 2024.
- A German-language production began performances at Theater Regensburg in Regensburg on February 10, 2025, and played at Deutsches Theater in Munich in July.
- From 2025 An English-language licensed professional production, in collaboration with Music Theatre International, premiered aboard Cunard Queen Elizabeth and subsequently aboard Queen Victoria.
- The Polish-language production, directed by Antoniusz Dietzius and translated by Daniel Wyszogrodzki, premiered on 11 September 2026 at Scena Relax Theatre in Warsaw, Poland.
- An English-speaking language production is in the making at the [American School] in The Hague, The Netherlands for showing in 2027.

==== The Americas ====
A Spanish-language production premiered at Teatro Maipo in Buenos Aires in 2022, and has had four seasons there as of 2025. Several productions of Come from Away have been staged in Gander. From July 7 to September 3, 2023, a sold-out production ran at the Joseph R Smallwood Arts & Culture Centre. The cast included Broadway cast members Petrina Bromley as Beverley/Annette & others and Astrid Van Wieren as Diane & others. Local productions have also run in the summers of 2024 and 2025, directed by Jillian Keiley. A production returned to Gander in 2026, with performances running from June 28 to September 13. This run commemorated the 25th anniversary of the September 11 attacks. This production was again directed by Jillian Keily and produced by Michael Rubinoff and You Are Here Inc.

Come from Away returned to Toronto in 2024 with the support of federal funding. It played at the Babs Asper Theatre in Ottawa between August 14 and September 1, 2024. It then began performances at the Royal Alexandra Theatre in Toronto on September 22, 2024 and closed May 4, 2025. The majority of the cast returned from the previous Toronto production and, for the Ottawa run, included Irene Sankoff as Bonnie & others.

A production played at the National Theatre of Panama in Panama City from September 24 to October 6, 2024. A production is planned for the MS Queen Elizabeth cruise ship beginning October 16, 2025. Numerous regional productions have also been staged at venues in Canada and the United States, including the Savoy Theatre, Glace Bay, the KIRA Amphitheatre, Saint Andrews and Imperial Theatre, Saint John in 2025, and an upcoming production is planned for 2026 at Neptune Theatre, Halifax and the Confederation Centre of the Arts, Charlottetown.

In late March 2026, it was announced that the first Portuguese-language adaptation of the musical would premiere in São Paulo, Brazil, where from June 26 to August 02 2026 it would occupy the stage of the Teatro Ruth Escobar. Casting will be revealed at a later date.

Community theatre performance rights for the United States and Canada were released in late 2025. In May of 2026, the first community theatre production in Ottawa, Ontario of Come From Away held auditions. The production was a collaboration of Suzart Productions and Maple Leaf Productions and played for 10 shows over the 25th anniversary of the 9-11 tragedy. The 2026 production at the Guthrie Theater (Minneapolis, Minnesota), directed by Kent Gash, was well received. The October 2026 production at Barter Theatre (Abingdon, Virginia), directed by Sarah Van Deusen White, was well received, and several patrons were so moved that they saw it more than once. A production in Yellowknife, Northwest Territories at the Northern Arts and Cultural Centre has been announced for April 2027.

It began a November and December 2026 run in Seattle at the Issaquah Village Theatre.

==== Asia ====
Productions were staged at the Kwanglim Arts Center in Seoul and at various theatres across Japan in 2024. In 2025, a production played in Manila.

In 2026, the show staged a production in Singapore under the Pangdemonium! brand at the Victoria Theatre, running from 11th September to 27th September of that year.

== Reception ==
=== Critical reception ===
==== Broadway ====
After receiving generally positive reviews during its out of town tryouts, Come from Away opened on Broadway to mostly positive reviews. Ben Brantley of The New York Times wrote that the show's portrayal of it subject "covers a vast expanse of sensitive material with a respect for its complexity". Robert Kahn of NBC New York called it "dignified". Joe Westerfield of Newsweek said that the use of the frequent humor in the show is "handled very smartly".

Reception of the characters was mixed. Jesse Green of New York criticized the rate at which the actors changed character, and Marilyn Stasio of Variety said "the characters have no character". The performances were well-received, with Frank Scheck of The Hollywood Reporter saying, "all the performers are first-rate, and the fact that they actually look like real people rather than glamorous, Pilates-toned Broadway regulars makes them even more endearing".

Ashley's direction was praised by critics. Peter Marks of the Washington Post said Come from Away was "some of the most impressive work of his career" and Matt Windman of AMNY called his direction "precise". The score received mixed reactions from critics. Allison Adato of Entertainment Weekly said "the music is confident and lively, and the direct, if not necessarily poetic, lyrics keep the character-based story moving at a pleasant clip", while Joe Dziemianowicz of New York Daily News said "the music suffers from sameness and a sound mix that obscures lyrics".

==== West End ====
Come from Away received mixed reviews on the West End. Dominic Maxwell of The Times called it a musical that "gets everything right", complimenting the score and cast. Paul Taylor of The Independent criticized the lack of conflict and called it "determinedly inspirational". Michael Billington of The Guardian gave it 3 stars out of 5, saying "[t]he show could hardly be better done even if, as a work of art, I found it lacking in complexity and argument". Reviewing the show when it reopened in 2021, Dominic Cavendish of The Daily Telegraph said the experience of the COVID-19 pandemic brought increased relevance to the story.

== Recordings ==
An original Broadway cast recording was released digitally on March 10, 2017, and physically on March 24, 2017. It peaked at number 92 on the Top Current Albums chart and number two on the Cast Albums chart. The album was nominated for the Grammy Award for Best Musical Theater Album at the 60th Grammy Awards.

On September 17, 2021, as part of a series of events for the 20th anniversary of 9/11, Covers from Away was released by Craft Recordings. The album featured songs from the show covered by artists from Newfoundland and Labrador, including Alan Doyle, The Once, The Irish Descendants, and The Dardanelles.

A Spanish-language cast recording of the Argentine cast was released on June 19, 2025.

== Awards and nominations ==
=== Original Broadway production ===
| Year | Award Ceremony | Category | Nominee | Result |
|---|---|---|---|---|
| 2017 | Tony Awards | Best Musical | | Nominated |
| 2017 | Tony Awards | Best Book of a Musical | Irene Sankoff and David Hein | Nominated |
| 2017 | Tony Awards | Best Original Score | Irene Sankoff and David Hein | Nominated |
| 2017 | Tony Awards | Best Direction of a Musical | Christopher Ashley | Won |
| 2017 | Tony Awards | Best Featured Actress in a Musical | Jenn Colella | Nominated |
| 2017 | Tony Awards | Best Lighting Design in a Musical | Howell Binkley | Nominated |
| 2017 | Tony Awards | Best Choreography | Kelly Devine | Nominated |
| 2017 | Drama Desk Awards | Outstanding Musical | | Won |
| 2017 | Drama Desk Awards | Outstanding Featured Actress in a Musical | Jenn Colella | Won |
| 2017 | Drama Desk Awards | Outstanding Director of a Musical | Christopher Ashley | Nominated |
| 2017 | Drama Desk Awards | Outstanding Choreography | Kelly Devine | Nominated |
| 2017 | Drama Desk Awards | Outstanding Book of a Musical | Irene Sankoff and David Hein | Won |
| 2017 | Drama Desk Awards | Outstanding Music | Irene Sankoff and David Hein | Nominated |
| 2017 | Drama Desk Awards | Outstanding Lyrics | Irene Sankoff and David Hein | Nominated |
| 2017 | Drama Desk Awards | Outstanding Orchestrations | August Eriksmoen | Nominated |
| 2017 | Drama Desk Awards | Outstanding Costume Design for a Musical | Toni-Leslie James | Nominated |
| 2017 | Outer Critics Circle Awards | Outstanding New Broadway Musical | | Won |
| 2017 | Outer Critics Circle Awards | Outstanding New Score | Irene Sankoff and David Hein | Nominated |
| 2017 | Outer Critics Circle Awards | Outstanding Book of a Musical | Irene Sankoff and David Hein | Won |
| 2017 | Outer Critics Circle Awards | Outstanding Director of a Musical | Christopher Ashley | Won |
| 2017 | Outer Critics Circle Awards | Outstanding Choreographer | Kelly Devine | Nominated |
| 2017 | Outer Critics Circle Awards | Outstanding Featured Actress in a Musical | Jenn Colella | Won |
| 2017 | Outer Critics Circle Awards | Outstanding Sound Design | Gareth Owen | Won |

=== Original West End production ===
| Year | Award Ceremony | Category | Nominee | Result |
|---|---|---|---|---|
| 2019 | Laurence Olivier Award | Best New Musical | | Won |
| 2019 | Laurence Olivier Award | Outstanding Achievement in Music | David Hein, Irene Sankoff, Ian Eisendrath, August Eriksmoen, Alan Berry, and the band | Won |
| 2019 | Laurence Olivier Award | Best Actor in a Supporting Role in a Musical | Clive Carter | Nominated |
| 2019 | Laurence Olivier Award | Best Actor in a Supporting Role in a Musical | Robert Hands | Nominated |
| 2019 | Laurence Olivier Award | Best Actress in a Supporting Role in a Musical | Rachel Tucker | Nominated |
| 2019 | Laurence Olivier Award | Best Lighting Design | Howell Binkley | Nominated |
| 2019 | Laurence Olivier Award | Best Sound Design | Gareth Owen | Won |
| 2019 | Laurence Olivier Award | Best Director | Christopher Ashley | Nominated |
| 2019 | Laurence Olivier Award | Best Theatre Choreographer | Kelly Devine | Won |
| 2020 | Critics' Circle Theatre Awards | Best Musical | | Won |

== Adaptations ==
=== Cancelled theatrical feature film ===
In November 2017, it was announced that The Mark Gordon Company would produce a feature film adaptation of the musical, with Sankoff and Hein writing the screenplay and Christopher Ashley as director. In April 2019, Sankoff and Hein stated that the intention was to shoot in Gander and cast lesser-known actors, with Gander residents as extras. The adaptation was placed on hold indefinitely in 2021 due to the COVID-19 pandemic.

=== Filmed stage production ===
In February 2021, amidst the COVID-19 pandemic and its impacts on the performing arts, it was announced Entertainment One and RadicalMedia would film Come from Away live on stage, employing over 200 actors and workers. A May 2021 staging at the Gerald Schoenfeld Theater with Ashley directing and Gordon as producer was filmed in front of an audience that included frontline workers and 9/11 survivors, featuring members of the Broadway cast.

The production team included Jennifer Todd, Bill Condon and one of the stage production's producers, Junkyard Dog Productions. Sankoff, Hein, Jon Kamen, Dave Sirulnick and Meredith Bennett executive produced. In April 2021, Apple TV+ acquired the film's distribution rights. It was released on September 10, 2021, one day before the 20th anniversary of 9/11.

== See also ==
- The Day the World Came to Town, 2002 book
- Diverted, 2009 TV mini-series
- Channel of Peace: Stranded in Gander on 9/11, 2018 book
- You Are Here, 2018 documentary film
