= Operation Yellow Ribbon =

Diversion of US flights into Canada after 9/11

- Gander International Airport in Newfoundland, Canada, played host to 38 airliners, totaling 6,122 passengers and 473 crew, as part of Operation Yellow Ribbon.
- Location: Canada
- Organised by: Transport Canada

Operation Yellow Ribbon (French: Opération ruban jaune) was commenced by Canada to handle the diversion of civilian airline flights in response to the September 11 attacks in 2001 in the United States. Canada's goal was to ensure that potentially destructive air traffic be removed from United States airspace as quickly as possible, and away from potential U.S. targets, and to instead place these aircraft on the ground in Canada, at military and civilian airports primarily in the Canadian provinces of Nova Scotia, Newfoundland and Labrador, and British Columbia.

Yukon, New Brunswick, Alberta, Manitoba, Ontario, the Northwest Territories, and Quebec also took in aircraft, so that any malicious or destructive potential threats could be better contained and neutralized. None of the aircraft proved to be a threat, and Canada hosted thousands of passengers who were stranded until U.S. airspace was reopened.

Canada commenced the operation after the U.S. Federal Aviation Administration (FAA), implementing Security Control of Air Traffic and Air Navigation Aids (SCATANA), grounded all aircraft across the United States, an unprecedented action. The FAA then worked with Transport Canada to reroute incoming international flights to airports in Canada.

During the operation, departing flights—with the exception of police, military, and humanitarian flights—were cancelled, marking the first time that Canadian airspace had been shut down. In total, as a result of Operation Yellow Ribbon, between 225 and 240 aircraft were diverted to 17 different airports across the country.

== Deployment of emergency measures ==
Immediately after the attacks on the World Trade Center (WTC), both Transport Canada and Nav Canada, the Canadian air navigation agency, activated their emergency measures.

=== Transport Canada ===
Transport Canada activated its situation centre (SitCen) in Ottawa at 09:21 EDT (13:21 UTC), 18 minutes after the second plane hit the WTC.

The SitCen is Transport Canada's emergency operations centre (EOC), originally constructed to deal with earthquakes along the British Columbia Coast. It had been used several times prior to September 11, 2001, including the January 1998 North American ice storm and after Swissair Flight 111 crashed off the coast from Peggy's Cove, Nova Scotia, on September 2, 1998. As personnel staffed the SitCen, key organizations such as Nav Canada, the Department of National Defence, the Royal Canadian Mounted Police (RCMP), Canadian Security Intelligence Service (CSIS), Citizenship and Immigration Canada (CIC), and Canada Customs and Revenue Agency (CCRA) were also involved in SitCen operations.

One of the tasks of the SitCen was to maintain contact with other members of the Canadian aviation community, such as the Air Transport Association of Canada and local airport authorities. Their counterparts in the FAA (United States) and other international civil aviation authorities were also kept apprised.

=== Nav Canada ===
Nav Canada set up two command centres, the Strategic Command Centre (SCC) and the Tactical Command Centre (TCC).

The SCC, located at the head office in Ottawa and headed by Andy Vasarins, vice-president of operations, oversaw the entire crisis and ensured that information and resources were effectively shared amongst the TCC and other parties.

The TCC was originally a training institute in Cornwall, Ontario, and headed by Kathy Fox, assistant vice-president of air traffic services. Its role in the crisis was to disseminate information amongst airports and control towers. To facilitate this, general managers from across Canada were present. After the immediate crisis passed, the TCC was relocated to the head office and its operations were merged with the SCC.

== The operation ==
The operation officially began at 09:45 ET (13:45 UTC), when Ben Sliney, working in his first day in his position as the U.S. Federal Aviation Administration's (FAA) National Operations Manager, ordered all U.S. airspace to be shut down as a result of the attacks.

=== Actions taken by Transport Canada ===
After learning that the FAA had closed down U.S. airspace, David Collenette, the Canadian Transport Minister, gave orders that Canadian airports be open only for outgoing police, military, and humanitarian flights, and incoming U.S. bound international flights. This was the first unplanned closure of Canadian airspace.

About 500 flights were en route to the U.S. at the time of the attacks. Transport Canada instructed Nav Canada to give permission for transoceanic flights that were at least halfway towards their destination (i.e. had already passed the point of no return across the Atlantic or Pacific Ocean) to land at the nearest Canadian airport, depending on their point of origin and remaining fuel. Planes were entering Canadian airspace at a rate of one to two planes per minute.

During the operation, SitCen staff focused on two issues: where to land the aircraft, and how to screen, deplane, and clear tens of thousands of passengers through immigration and customs. CIC and CCRA brought in extra staff from other posts to clear the passengers.

The first airport to receive diverted flights was Canadian Forces Base (CFB) Goose Bay, which received seven aircraft; fourteen other airports across Canada also received the diverted flights. As the operation progressed, SitCen staff maintained contact with the affected airports, Collenette, and his deputy, Margaret Bloodworth.

=== Atlantic flights ===
The operation was a challenge for airports in Atlantic Canada. Transport Canada asked Nav Canada to instruct flights coming from Europe to avoid Macdonald–Cartier International Airport in Ottawa, Lester B. Pearson International Airport in Toronto, and Dorval International Airport in Montreal as a security measure, since they are the busiest airports in Central Canada. The majority of incoming flights from Europe were received by Atlantic airports, though some diverted flights did land at Dorval and Pearson.

Gander International Airport, which was the first North American airport on the transatlantic route, took in 38 wide-body aircraft, mostly heading for U.S. destinations. The number of passengers and crew accommodated at Gander was about 6,600. The population of Gander at the time was fewer than 10,000 people. Jean Chrétien, then-Canadian Prime Minister, stated that in the span of a few hours the population of Gander jumped by more than 50%.

Halifax International Airport handled 40 flights in a similar manner. St. John's International Airport handled 27, Greater Moncton International Airport, CFB Goose Bay handled 7, and Stephenville International Airport handled 13 of the transatlantic flights.

=== Pacific flights ===
Most flights coming from Asia and the Pacific to destinations on the West Coast of the United States and points beyond had no choice but to land at Vancouver International Airport, as it was the only major Canadian airport on the West Coast capable of handling the large aircraft used for transpacific flights. Thirty-four flights carrying 8,500 passengers landed in Vancouver, British Columbia.

=== Military involvement ===
There were several incidents in which the military escorted jets into Canadian airspace. The joint U.S.–Canadian North American Aerospace Defense Command used Canadian Forces Air Command and United States Air Force fighter jet aircraft to intercept and escort civilian passenger flights to Whitehorse International Airport in Yukon.

One of the intercepted flights was Korean Air Flight 85, destined for John F. Kennedy International Airport with a stopover in Anchorage, Alaska, which was believed to have been hijacked. Concerns about the plane being crashed into Anchorage led several buildings in the city to be evacuated. Several buildings were also evacuated in Whitehorse as a precaution. The flight ended up running low on fuel, and according to a public affairs official at the airport, there was also a communication problem with the air crew.

When it landed at the airport, witnesses reported that the RCMP ordered the crew out of the plane at gunpoint. The incident was a misunderstanding caused by a malfunctioning transponder and translation error. A year after the event, then-Prime Minister Jean Chrétien revealed that he had given permission to the intercepting fighter jets to shoot down the airliner if the fighter pilots believed that the plane carried terrorists.

Global and the National Post reported that a similar incident occurred at Vancouver International Airport. Two U.S. F-15s escorted an Air China Boeing 747 bound from Beijing to San Francisco onto the airport's north runway. Officials at the airport reported that it was purely a communication problem.

=== Reaction ===
Prior to landing, most pilots did not inform passengers of the situation or the attacks in order to avoid fear and panic. On some planes, even pilots were unaware of the terrorist attacks. Global TV quoted one pilot telling reporters: "When we were in the air, we really didn't know what was going on. All we heard was security measures and we were diverted. That was all we knew…"

Only after landing did pilots tell passengers what had happened, sometimes addressing passengers directly in the cabin. The Washington Post quoted a woman whose flight from Frankfurt to Dallas was diverted to Pearson, saying that three hours before landing, the pilot announced that the plane was heading through turbulence. She went on to say that "then he said we were experiencing strong headwinds and we had to land in Canada to refuel. When we landed, he said, 'Okay, there's been a terrorist attack.'"

Passengers had to wait for hours to disembark because Transport Canada was on high-security alert. The RCMP deployed extra personnel to airports so that they could perform a security sweep of each aircraft, lined up on closed runways at most airports. They also increased their presence in the airport terminals.

At some airports, stranded passengers watched television coverage while others talked to the airport chaplains, as at Pearson. Airports had crisis support teams to help them.

The CBC reported that the operation received thanks from Washington. Norman Mineta, the United States Secretary of Transportation, said at a White House news briefing that "we owe our Canadian neighbours a debt of gratitude for helping us as we redirected…flights and their passengers to airports in Canada." On the tenth anniversary of 9/11, President Barack Obama recalled Canada's help on that day, and expressed his gratitude for Canada's friendship and solidarity.

== Aftermath ==
=== Totals ===
The actual number of diverted aircraft and passengers varies from each source. Transport Canada said over 33,000 passengers on 224 flights arrived in Canada. Nav Canada cited 239 flights. According to Prime Minister Jean Chrétien, the number of flights was between 225 and 250 and the number of passengers was between 30,000 and 45,000.

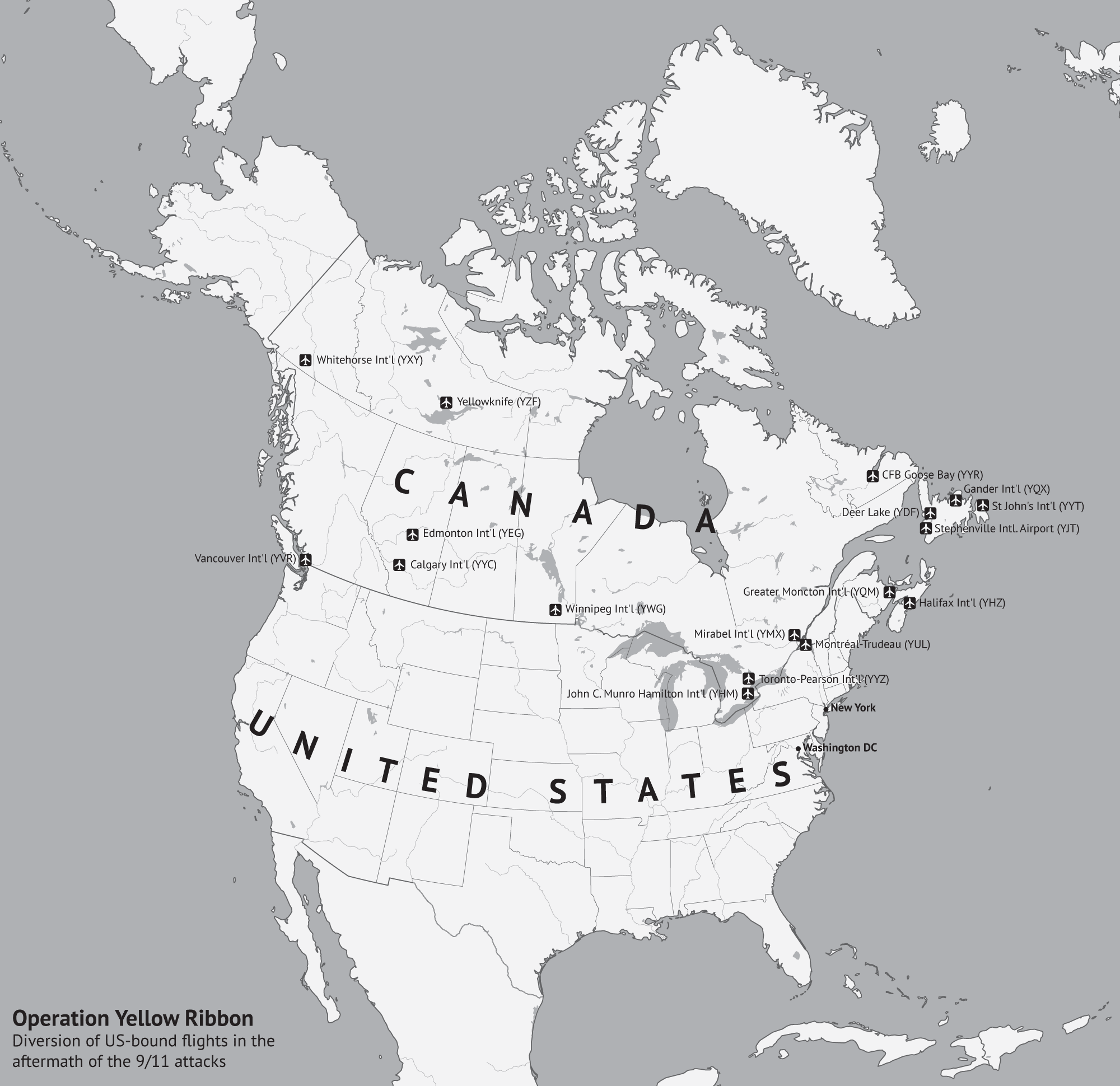
A map showing airports where US-bound flights diverted to.

Data according to Nav Canada
Airport	Airport code	# of planes	# of passengers
Halifax International Airport	YHZ	47	7,300
Gander International Airport	YQX	38	6,656
Vancouver International Airport	YVR	34	8,500
St. John's International Airport	YYT	21	
Winnipeg International Airport	YWG	15	
Toronto Pearson International Airport	YYZ	14	
Calgary International Airport	YYC	13	
Greater Moncton International Airport	YQM	10	
Montréal–Mirabel International Airport	YMX	10	
Stephenville International Airport	YJT	13	
Canadian Forces Base Goose Bay	YYR	7	
Montréal-Dorval International Airport	YUL	7	
Edmonton International Airport	YEG	6	
Hamilton International Airport	YHM	4	
Whitehorse International Airport	YXY	2	
Deer Lake Airport	YDF	1	
Yellowknife Airport	YZF	1	
Total		238	

Halifax International Airport received the most flights while Vancouver International Airport received the most passengers.

Transport Canada and airports involved in the operation reported a dramatic increase in traffic at their websites for updated and current information concerning news releases, FAQs, and diverted flight information. Transport Canada reported that on September 12, 2001, the day after the attacks, there were more than 47,000 visits to their web site alone. Halifax International Airport reported that just in September, there were 2.1 million visits to their web site, and in October, half a million. Both numbers were far above the average at the time of 40,000 to 50,000 visits per month.

=== Consequences for Canada ===
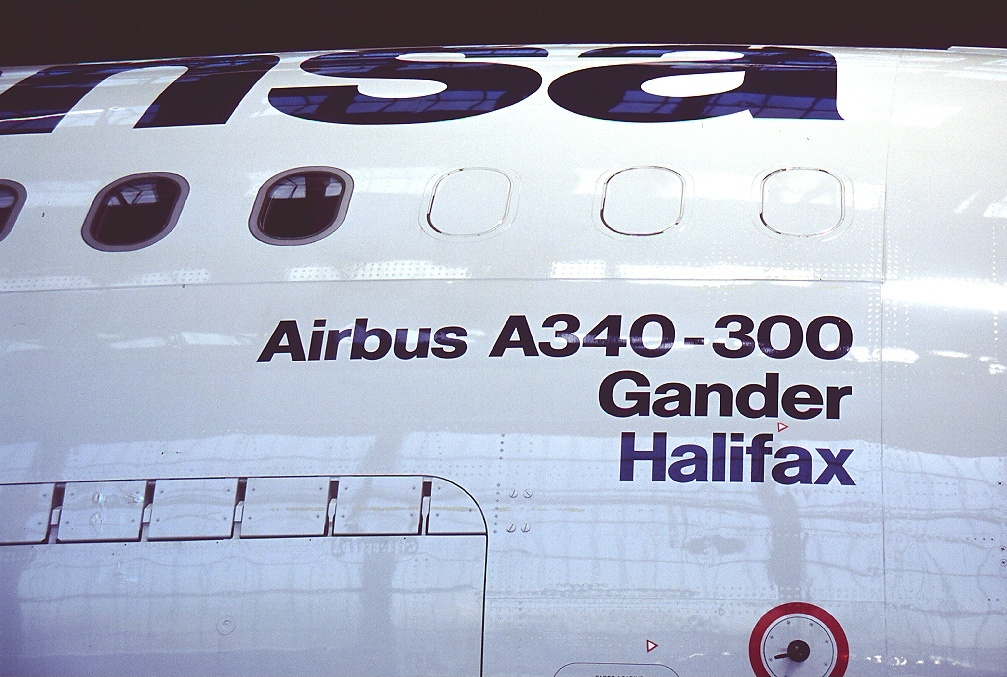
Lufthansa christened an Airbus A340, registered D-AIFC, Gander – Halifax to honour the two cities that received its stranded flights during Operation Yellow Ribbon.

After the initial task of diverting the flights was over, thousands of stranded passengers and flight crews had to be housed and fed until the crisis was over. During the diversion of flights, some airports, including Vancouver International, were inundated with hundreds of telephone calls from members of the public and the corporate community offering their support. In Ottawa, SitCen staff were inundated with calls from airports, air carriers, the media, and the general public. SitCen staff received an estimated 5,000 calls a day.

When asked in a CNN interview if he was able to get food to the passengers, Jean Chrétien, the Prime Minister of Canada, said that he was able to, and that "many of them have been accommodated in hotels and schools and gymnasiums and so on. And the Canadian authorities and provincial authorities are working… [to make their visitors] in those places as comfortable as possible."

Public efforts to help those affected by Operation Yellow Ribbon led to positive remarks on the subject by people such as Chrétien and his wife, Aline; the United States Ambassador to Canada, Paul Cellucci; Collenette; Governor General Adrienne Clarkson and her husband, John Ralston Saul; and in the provinces, premiers, and lieutenant governors. Airports involved in the effort received messages of thanks from passengers, airlines, residents who took in the passengers, and staff at U.S. immigration and U.S. customs. Edmonton International Airport also received a child passenger's drawing of the diverted flights on the ground there, published on page 12 of their 2001 annual report. Some airports, including Halifax and Edmonton, also published messages of thanks on their websites or annual reports. Many stories of the hospitality given to stranded passengers have come out as a result of the operation.

Some airports were awarded for how they handled the crisis. The British Columbia Aviation Council presented its 2001 Airport Management Award to Vancouver International Airport, citing its professional and compassionate handling of the situation, while the Canadian Public Relations Society (Nova Scotia) presented Halifax International an Amethyst Award in the Crisis Communications category to honour the authority's crisis communication response to the situation.

On September 11, 2002, about 2,500 people gathered at Gander International Airport for Canada's memorial service to mark the first anniversary of the attacks, over which Chrétien, Collenette, and Cellucci and other provincial and local officials presided. Chrétien addressed them: "9/11 will live long in memory as a day of terror and grief. But thanks to the countless acts of kindness and compassion done for those stranded visitors here in Gander and right across Canada it will live forever in memory as a day of comfort and of healing" and closed his speech by commending Operation Yellow Ribbon, "You did yourselves proud, ladies and gentlemen, and you did Canada proud."

== In popular culture ==
Operation Yellow Ribbon has been the subject of several popularizations.

It was dramatized in the CBC miniseries Diverted. Gander's part in Operation Yellow Ribbon is examined in the 2018 film You Are Here, which won the Canadian Screen Award for best documentary. The efforts of Gander Centre and Gander Air Traffic control during Operation Yellow Ribbon were showcased on a Discovery Channel documentary entitled 9/11: Cleared for Chaos.

It is also the subject of the Broadway musical Come from Away, written by the Canadian writing team of Irene Sankoff and David Hein. The musical follows the stories of several passengers, Newfoundlanders, and flight crews in the days following 9/11. The show ran on Broadway at the Schoenfeld Theatre from 2017 to October 2, 2022. It received seven nominations in the 2017 71st Tony Awards, including best musical. It won a Tony Award for Best Direction of a Musical.

On the 25th anniversary of the September 11 attacks, Historica Canada released a Heritage Minutes episode that looked into Gander's part in Operation Yellow Ribbon.

== Sources ==
=== Books ===
- The Day the World came to town: 9/11 in Gander, Newfoundland. Harper Collins. 2003. ISBN 978-0-06-055971-7.
- "Mac Moss. Flown into the Arms of Angels: Newfoundland and Labrador's Unsung Heroes of 9/11
- Transport Canada (2002). 11–09–2001 Four Days in September (PDF). Ottawa: Her Majesty the Queen in Right of Canada. ISBN 0-662-66832-4.

=== Television ===
- Attack on the USA (television). CBC News. September 11, 2001.
- Global National: America Under Attack (television). Global TV. September 11, 2001.

=== Newspapers ===
- Higgins, Michael; Smyth, Julie (September 12, 2001). "Military Escorts Jets to Airports After Hijacking Fears". The National Post. p. A9.
