= Gander, Newfoundland and Labrador =

Town in Newfoundland and Labrador, Canada

Gander
- Town
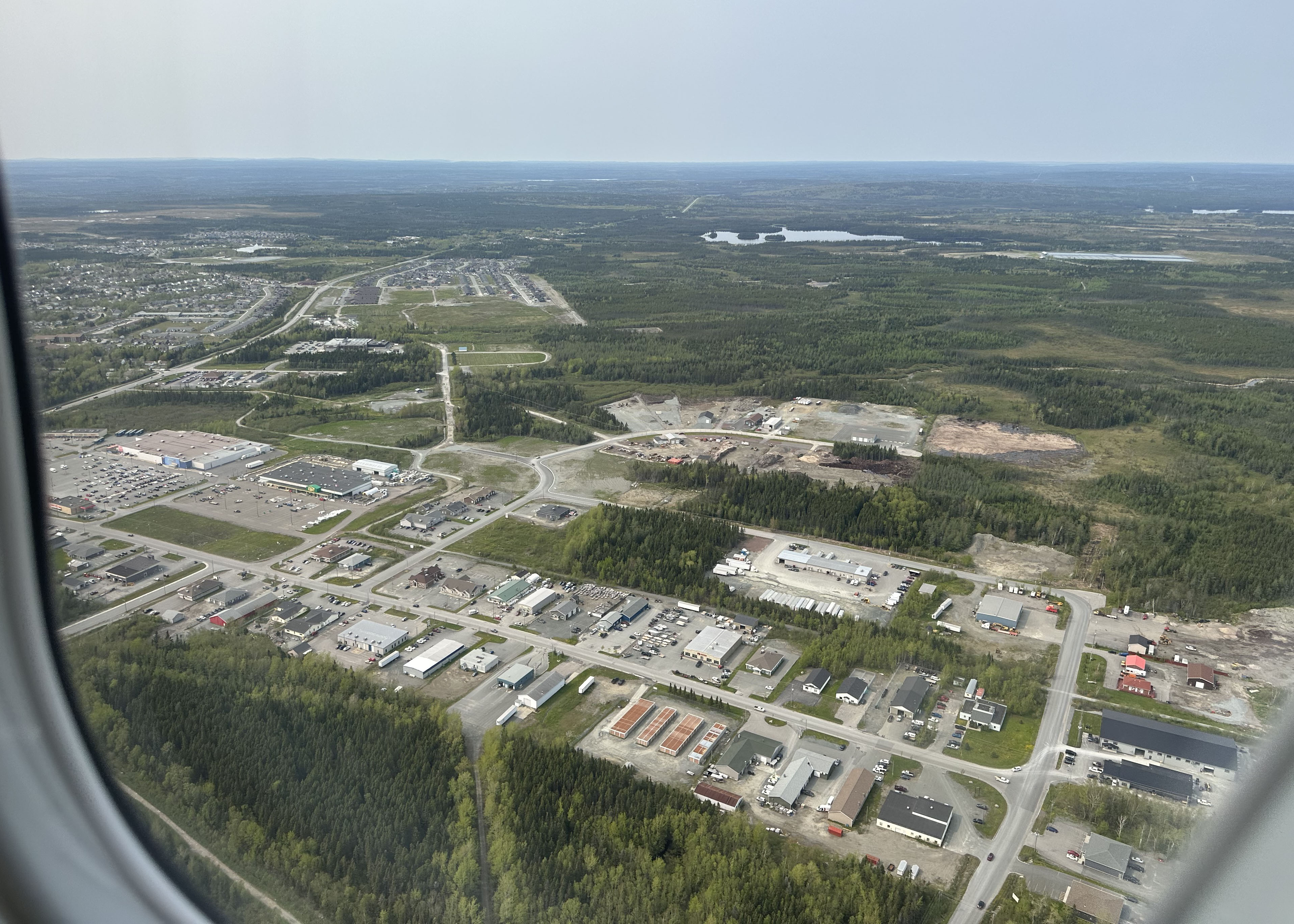

- Seal Coat of arms
- Motto(s): "Volet Gander" (Latin) "May Gander soar"
- Location of Gander Gander (Canada)
- Coordinates: 48°57′26″N 54°35′19″W
- Country: Canada
- Province: Newfoundland and Labrador
- Census division: Division No. 6, Newfoundland and Labrador
- Settled: 1936
- Incorporated: 1958

Government
  - Type: Gander Town Council
  - Mayor: Percy Farwell

Area (2021)
  - Town: 104.53 km^{2} (40.36 sq mi)
  - Urban: 13.64 km^{2} (5.27 sq mi)
  - Metro: 2,412.67 km^{2} (931.54 sq mi)
- Elevation: 128 m (420 ft)

Population (2021)
  - Town: 11,880
  - Density: 113.7/km^{2} (294/sq mi)
  - Urban: 9,918
  - Urban density: 727.2/km^{2} (1,883/sq mi)
  - Metro: 13,414
  - Metro density: 5.6/km^{2} (15/sq mi)
- Time zone: UTC−03:30 (NST)
  - Summer (DST): UTC−02:30 (NDT)
- Postal code span: A1V
- Area code: 709
- Highways: Route 1 (TCH); Route 330
- Website: www.gandercanada.com

Gander is a town located in the northeastern part of the island of Newfoundland in the Canadian province of Newfoundland and Labrador, approximately 40 km (25 mi) south of Gander Bay, 100 km (62 mi) south of Twillingate and 90 km (56 mi) east of Grand Falls-Windsor. Located on the northeastern shore of Gander Lake, it is the site of Gander International Airport, once an important refuelling stop for transatlantic aircraft. The airport is still a preferred emergency landing point for aircraft facing on-board medical or security issues.

When the U.S. closed its airspace after the September 11 attacks, Gander International Airport took in 38 commercial aircraft and four military aircraft; the town also accommodated nearly 6,700 passengers from airlines such as Olympic Airways, Air France, Lufthansa, British Airways, and Alitalia.

Most of the streets in Gander are named after famous aviators, including Alcock and Brown, Amelia Earhart, Charles Lindbergh, Eddie Rickenbacker, Marc Garneau, and Chuck Yeager.

== History ==
Gander was chosen for the construction of an airport in 1935, because it is very close to the great circle route between New York City and London. In 1936, construction of the base began, and the town started to develop. On 11 January 1938, Captain Douglas Fraser made the first landing at "Newfoundland Airport," now known as Gander International Airport, or "CYQX," in a single-engine biplane, Fox Moth VO-ADE.

During the Second World War, as many as 10,000 Canadian, British and American military personnel resided in Gander. The area became a strategic post for the Air Ferry Command of the Royal Air Force, with approximately 20,000 American- and Canadian-built fighters and bombers stopping at Gander en route to Europe. After the war, the airbase became a civilian airport, and the location of the town was moved a safe distance from the runways. Construction of the present town site began in the 1950s, and the present municipality was incorporated in 1958; the settlement around the airport was eventually abandoned.

After the Second World War, the town grew as the airport was used as a refuelling stop for transatlantic flights, earning its name "Cross-roads of the world." Efforts were made to diversify the economy from being dependent on the airport, particularly as new aircraft designs permitted longer-range flights without the need for landing to refuel.

Gander was the site of a major aircraft accident, Arrow Air Flight 1285, on 12 December 1985; 256 people were killed in the disaster, probably caused by ice contamination on the wings, making it the deadliest air crash ever to happen in Canada.

=== Assistance following September 11 attacks ===
In 2001, Gander International Airport played an integral role in world aviation in the hours immediately following the September 11 attacks when all airspace in Canada and the USA was closed by Transport Canada and the United States Federal Aviation Administration (FAA). As part of Operation Yellow Ribbon, 38 civilian and 4 military flights bound for the United States were ordered to land at the airport—more flights than any Canadian airport other than Halifax International. More than 6,600 passengers and airline crew members—equivalent to 66% of the local population at the time—were forced to stay in the Gander area for up to six days until airspace was reopened. Gander received the third highest volume of passengers following Operation Yellow Ribbon, behind Vancouver International Airport, which received 8,500, and Halifax International. Residents of Gander and surrounding communities volunteered to house, feed, and entertain the travellers as part of Operation Yellow Ribbon. This was largely because Transport Canada and Nav Canada asked that transatlantic flights avoid diverting to major airports in central Canada, such as Toronto Pearson and Montréal-Dorval.

Lufthansa named one of its Airbus A340 (registration D-AIFC) aircraft Gander/Halifax to thank both cities for their handling of rerouted travellers on 11 September. A book, The Day the World Came to Town, included several stories about Gander's role during that and subsequent days. A radio play, The Day the Planes Came, by Caroline and David Stafford, dealing with the effect on Gander of the 11 September passengers was first broadcast in June 2008 on BBC Radio 4 and was repeated in October 2009. A TV movie, Diverted, was made in 2009. In February 2010, NBC aired a report by Tom Brokaw covering Gander's part in the grounding of hundreds of planes on 9/11 during coverage of the 2010 Winter Olympics in Vancouver. A musical by Irene Sankoff and David Hein, Come from Away, which retells the stories of passengers and Newfoundlanders in Gander after Operation Yellow Ribbon, was mounted on Broadway in 2017. The same year, Come from Away was nominated for seven Tony Awards and won the Tony for Best Direction of Musical. The town was also profiled in Moze Mossanen's 2018 documentary film You Are Here. National Geographic Episode 9/11: Control The Skies tells the story of the air traffic controllers, first broadcast on 11 September 2019.

The Town of Gander continues to pursue business opportunities in the aerospace industry.

== Geography ==
Gander is located 310 km (190 mi) northwest of the provincial capital of St. John's. Ordovician age shale, slate and greywacke form the underlying bedrock, which is covered by stony loam to silt loam podzolic or gleysolic soil.

== Demographics ==
Historical population
Year	Pop.	±%
1961	5,725	—
1981	10,404	+81.7%
1991	10,339	−0.6%
1996	10,364	+0.2%
2001	9,651	−6.9%
2006	9,951	+3.1%
2011	11,054	+11.1%
2016	11,688	+5.7%
2021	11,880	+1.6%

In the 2021 Canadian census conducted by Statistics Canada, Gander had a population of 11,880 living in 5,068 of its 5,424 total private dwellings, a change of 1.6% from its 2016 population of 11,688. With a land area of 104.53 km^{2} (40.36 sq mi), it had a population density of 113.7/km^{2} (294.4/sq mi) in 2021.

As of the 2021 census, the population of Gander was found to be 89.7% white with all visible minorities totalling 2.7% of the population and the Indigenous population totalling 7.5%.

Mother tongue language (2021)

Language	Population	Pct (%)
English only	11,365	96.6%
French only	60	0.5%
Both English and French	30	0.3%
Other languages	260	2.2%

== Climate ==
Gander has a cool to cold humid continental climate (Köppen climate classification Dfb). It combines moderately warm and rainy summers with cold and very snowy winters. Due to the maritime influence from the Atlantic Ocean, seasonal changes are slightly less pronounced than in Canada's interior, but still substantial given its near-coastal position. Its average frost-free period runs from June 1 to October 16–136 days.

Climate data for Gander International Airport, 1991–2020 normals, extremes 1937–present
Month	Jan	Feb	Mar	Apr	May	Jun	Jul	Aug	Sep	Oct	Nov	Dec	Year
Record high humidex	16.5	13.4	17.5	24.8	33.0	40.0	40.4	39.0	34.6	29.8	25.7	18.0	40.4
Record high °C (°F)	14.2 (57.6)	13.4 (56.1)	18.1 (64.6)	22.6 (72.7)	31.0 (87.8)	33.7 (92.7)	35.6 (96.1)	34.5 (94.1)	29.1 (84.4)	24.7 (76.5)	20.6 (69.1)	15.2 (59.4)	35.6 (96.1)
Mean daily maximum °C (°F)	−2.8 (27.0)	−2.7 (27.1)	0.3 (32.5)	5.4 (41.7)	11.7 (53.1)	17.0 (62.6)	21.8 (71.2)	21.4 (70.5)	16.9 (62.4)	10.4 (50.7)	5.1 (41.2)	0.1 (32.2)	8.7 (47.7)
Daily mean °C (°F)	−6.6 (20.1)	−6.8 (19.8)	−3.8 (25.2)	1.4 (34.5)	6.7 (44.1)	11.6 (52.9)	16.6 (61.9)	16.6 (61.9)	12.3 (54.1)	6.7 (44.1)	1.8 (35.2)	−3.1 (26.4)	4.5 (40.1)
Mean daily minimum °C (°F)	−10.4 (13.3)	−10.9 (12.4)	−7.7 (18.1)	−2.7 (27.1)	1.6 (34.9)	6.2 (43.2)	11.3 (52.3)	11.7 (53.1)	7.7 (45.9)	2.9 (37.2)	−1.5 (29.3)	−6.3 (20.7)	0.2 (32.4)
Record low °C (°F)	−27.2 (−17.0)	−31.1 (−24.0)	−28.8 (−19.8)	−17.6 (0.3)	−8.9 (16.0)	−2.8 (27.0)	0.6 (33.1)	−1.1 (30.0)	−1.7 (28.9)	−7.2 (19.0)	−15.7 (3.7)	−26.1 (−15.0)	−31.1 (−24.0)
Record low wind chill	−43.4	−46.7	−44.7	−29.1	−16.7	−8.7	0.0	0.0	−6.5	−14.9	−28.0	−40.2	−46.7
Average precipitation mm (inches)	102.8 (4.05)	91.4 (3.60)	105.2 (4.14)	92.0 (3.62)	93.8 (3.69)	88.8 (3.50)	105.0 (4.13)	101.7 (4.00)	115.2 (4.54)	119.9 (4.72)	110.1 (4.33)	121.3 (4.78)	1,247.1 (49.10)
Average rainfall mm (inches)	26.2 (1.03)	25.0 (0.98)	25.4 (1.00)	51.7 (2.04)	78.2 (3.08)	89.8 (3.54)	107.2 (4.22)	106.5 (4.19)	121.1 (4.77)	116.0 (4.57)	80.4 (3.17)	54.7 (2.15)	882.2 (34.73)
Average snowfall cm (inches)	97.1 (38.2)	81.0 (31.9)	85.5 (33.7)	45.5 (17.9)	10.6 (4.2)	1.5 (0.6)	0.0 (0.0)	0.0 (0.0)	0.1 (0.0)	12.4 (4.9)	29.7 (11.7)	80.2 (31.6)	443.4 (174.6)
Average precipitation days (≥ 0.2 mm)	20.3	17.6	19.6	17.7	18.9	17.4	17.5	16.0	16.2	20.4	20.0	21.6	223.3
Average rainy days (≥ 0.2 mm)	7.4	7.1	10.0	12.5	17.6	17.6	18.0	16.4	17.0	19.9	14.3	10.9	168.9
Average snowy days (≥ 0.2 cm)	18.7	16.9	16.0	10.8	4.1	0.3	0.0	0.0	0.2	3.5	10.3	17.4	98.2
Average relative humidity (%) (at 1500 LST)	75.3	71.3	69.4	66.4	64.6	64.4	63.1	63.8	66.6	72.6	77.6	80.5	69.6
Mean monthly sunshine hours	93.7	105.4	117.2	130.5	163.2	183.7	218.7	208.1	148.5	110.4	72.6	72.4	1,624.2
Percentage possible sunshine	34.6	36.8	31.9	31.8	34.5	38.0	44.8	46.7	39.2	32.9	26.3	28.1	35.5
Source: Environment Canada (sunshine 1981–2010)

== Services ==
=== James Paton Memorial Health Centre ===
Medical services are provided by the James Paton Memorial Health Centre, on the Trans-Canada Highway. The hospital opened in May 1964 and has undergone many changes since then, making it a prominent hospital in the central region. The hospital has a rated beds capacity of 92.

=== Steele Community Centre ===
The Steele Community Centre, previously named the Gander Community Centre, is a multi-purpose venue located on Airport Boulevard. The community centre, owned and operated by the Town of Gander, is used to host trade shows, conferences, sporting events and special events. It is home to the Gander Flyers of the Central West Senior Hockey League.

During Operation Yellow Ribbon, the people of Gander and surrounding communities donated large amounts of food and other supplies for the unexpected visitors. The Gander Community Centre became a giant "walk-in fridge" for the food donations.

== In popular culture ==
Gander airport features in the Nevil Shute novel No Highway and the film adaptation, called No Highway in the Sky in Anglophone countries other than the UK.

in 2006, the miniseries Above and Beyond deals with the Atlantic Ferry Organization, tasked with ferrying aircraft from North America to Europe in the early years of the Second World War. The production was filmed primarily at the Gander airport, and details the development of the airport as a ferry stop.

In 2013, Come from Away, a musical by Irene Sankoff and David Hein based on the events in Gander on and after 11 September was first performed at Sheridan College in Oakville, Ontario, following a workshop there the previous year. It became a co-production of the La Jolla Playhouse and the Seattle Repertory Theatre, and opened in San Diego on 29 May 2015. The show saw a production in Washington, D.C., at Ford's Theatre, from September to October 2016, then, prior to opening in Toronto, staged a pair of shows in Gander. It opened at Toronto's Royal Alexandra Theatre, running from November 2016 to January 2017, where it set a ticket sales record for the 109-year-old venue. It opened in New York on Broadway at the Gerald Schoenfeld Theatre on 12 March 2017, and returned to the Royal Alex in Toronto on 13 February 2018. In the year 2017, at the 71st Tony Awards, the musical was nominated for seven Tony Awards, alongside other musical award nominations, ultimately winning one for Best Direction of a Musical by Christopher Ashley. The show has gone on to be played in various cities around North and South America and Europe for over a decade.

== Planetary nomenclature ==
In 1991, the International Astronomical Union's Working Group for Planetary System Nomenclature (IAU/WGPSN) officially named a crater on Mars after Gander. Gander Crater lies at latitude 31.5° south, longitude 265.9° west; its diameter is 38 km (24 mi).

== Public parks, walking and ski trails ==
- Cobbs Pond Rotary Park: a small park located on the northern edge of Gander. Amenities include: picnic area, washrooms, wharf, playground and a 3 km (1.9 mi) boardwalk trail. It is also the site of the town's annual festival, The Festival of Flight, which occurs on the first Monday of August. The site reopened with renovations in 2014.
- Thomas Howe Demonstration Forest: an interpretive demonstration forest located 2 km (1.2 mi) east of Gander on the Trans-Canada Highway. Amenities include: three walking trails with interpretive panels, a picnic area, washrooms and snowshoe trails.
- Gander Heritage Trails: meander through the streets of old airport sectors where Gander once existed, near Gander International Airport. Look for remnants of old building foundations, benches and interpretive panels.
- Newfoundland Trailway: the old Canadian National Railway that passed through Gander has been developed for walking, biking, snowmobiling and cross-country skiing. Some sections between Cobb's Pond Rotary Park and the Old Town Site have been paved.
- The Airport Nordic Ski Club: located 3 km (1.9 mi) west of Gander on the Trans Canada Highway. The club has 16 km (9.9 mi) of trails groomed for both diagonal stride and skating by a Pisten Bully Groomer, and 5.5 km (3.4 mi) of dedicated snowshoe trails. Ski 4 km (2.5 mi) of lighted trails nightly from dusk until 10 PM (weather and snow conditions permitting). The club is a non-profit, volunteer-run organization that has hosted a number of provincial events including the KidsFest, Midget and High School Championships.
- Gander Heritage Memorial Park: located in central Gander on Airport Boulevard. It holds various monuments to aviators and soldiers from Gander and from elsewhere in Newfoundland, and the town describes it as being "envisaged as a place of quiet thought and contemplation". There is a statue of Gander, a Newfoundland dog posthumously awarded the Dickin Medal, the "animals' VC", in 2000 for his deeds in World War II, the first such award in over 50 years.

== Freedom of the Town ==
In 2017, the 103 Search and Rescue Squadron, RCAF received the Freedom of the Town award.

== See also ==
- North Atlantic Aviation Museum
