= Gander International Airport =

Airport in Newfoundland and Labrador, Canada

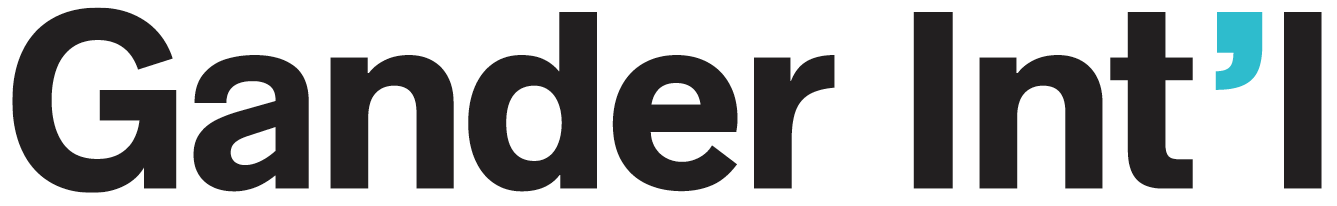

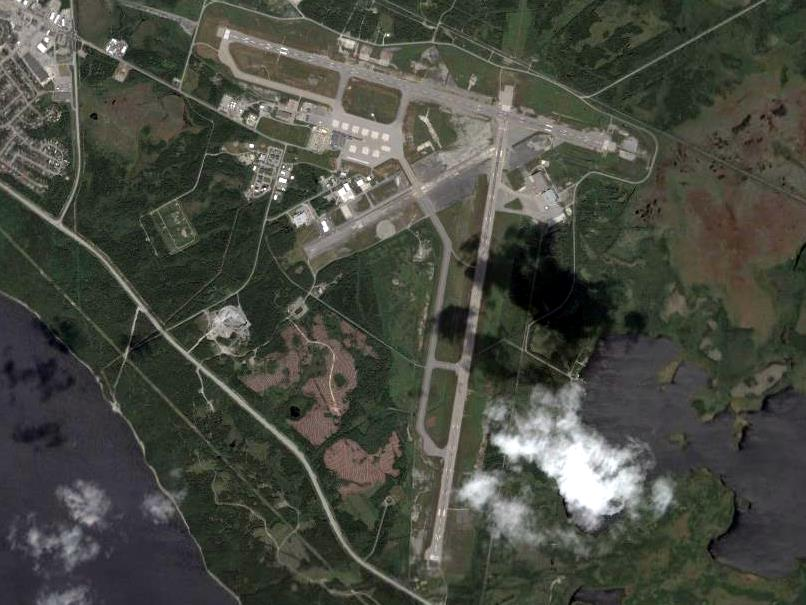
- IATA: YQX; ICAO: CYQX; WMO: 71803

Summary
- Airport type: Public
- Owner: Transport Canada
- Operator: Gander International Airport Authority
- Serves: Gander, Newfoundland and Labrador
- Time zone: NST (UTC−03:30)
  - Summer (DST): NDT (UTC−02:30)
- Elevation AMSL: 496 ft (151 m)
- Coordinates: 48°56′13″N 54°34′05″W
- Website: www.ganderairport.com

Maps
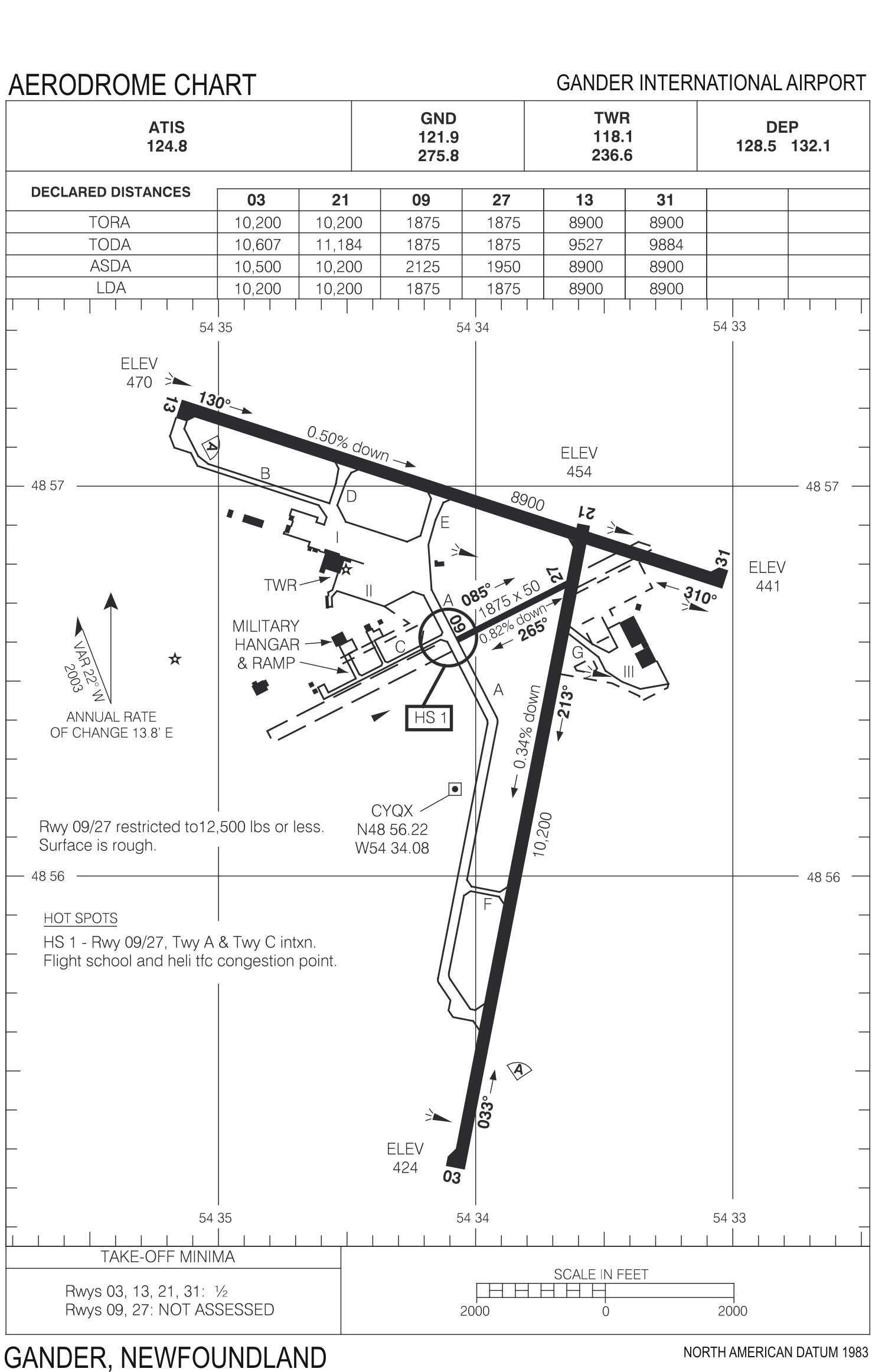
- Transport Canada airport diagram

- Location in Newfoundland and Labrador

Runways
Direction	Length		Surface
Direction	ft	m	Surface
03/21	10,200	3,109	Asphalt
13/31	8,900	2,713	Asphalt

Statistics (2024)
- Aircraft movements: 24,037
- Total Passengers: 115,978
- Sources: Canada Flight Supplement; Environment Canada; Movements from Statistics Canada; Passengers from Gander Airport

Gander International Airport (IATA: YQX, ICAO: CYQX) is an international airport located in Gander, Newfoundland and Labrador, Canada, and is operated by the Gander International Airport Authority. Canadian Forces Base Gander shares the airfield but is a separate entity from the airport. The airport is sometimes referred to as the "Crossroads of the World", and is classified as an international airport by Transport Canada.

== History ==
=== Early years and prominence ===
Construction of the airport began in 1936. It was opened in 1938, with its first landing on January 11, by Captain Douglas Fraser flying a Fox Moth of Imperial Airways. Within a few years it had four runways and was the largest airport in the world. Its official name until 1949 was "Newfoundland Airport".

In 1940, the operation of the Newfoundland Airport was assigned by the Dominion of Newfoundland to the Royal Canadian Air Force (RCAF). In 1941, it was renamed "RCAF Station Gander". The airfield was heavily used by RAF Ferry Command and Air Transport Command for transporting newly built aircraft across the Atlantic Ocean to the European Theatre, and for staging operational anti-submarine patrols dedicated to hunting U-boats in the northwest Atlantic. Thousands of aircraft flown by the United States Army Air Corps through the changeover to the United States Army Air Forces and by the RCAF destined for the European Theatre travelled through Gander.

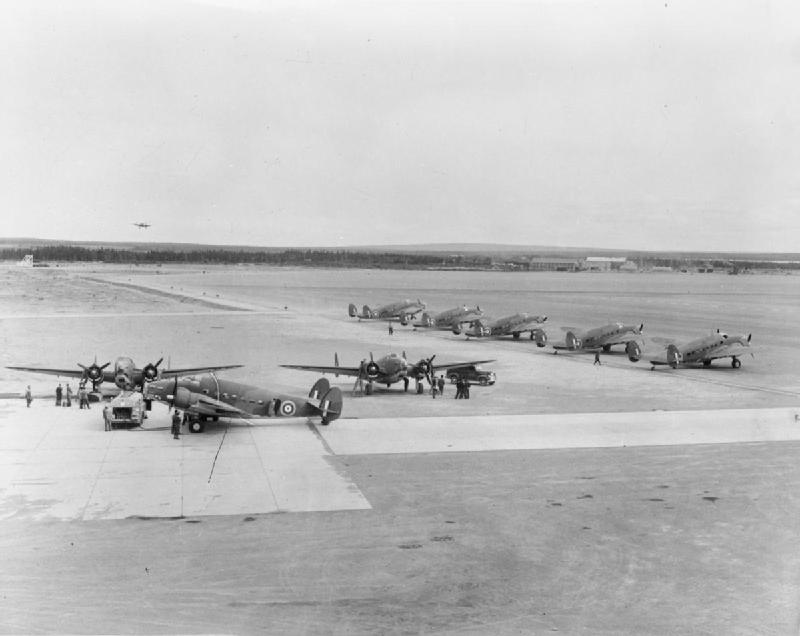
Lockheed Hudson Mark IIIs prepared for their trans-Atlantic ferry flights at Gander in 1942

The Royal Canadian Navy (RCN) also established Naval Radio Station Gander at the airfield, using the station as a listening post to detect the transmissions and location of enemy submarines and warships.

In March 1946, the RCAF handed operation of the airfield back to the Dominion of Newfoundland government. The RCN's radio station remained and the military role for the entire facility was upgraded through the Cold War.

In 1949, the Canadian federal government changed the name to "Gander Airport" after Newfoundland joined Canada. It opened the current passenger terminal in 1959.

=== Transatlantic refueling stop ===
On 16 September 1945, the first transatlantic proving flight, a Pan Am DC-4, departed Gander for Shannon in western Ireland. On 24 October 1945, the first scheduled commercial flight, an American Overseas Airlines DC-4, passed through Gander.

Following Newfoundland's entry into Confederation, the government renamed the airport "Gander International Airport", and it came under the administration of Canada's federal Department of Transport. Numerous improvements were made to the runways and terminals.

Gander is near the great circle route between eastern North America and Europe. Starting in the 1940s it was a refueling stop for transatlantic flights and continued in this role to the early 1960s and in some cases into the 1990s. Carriers at Gander during this era included:

- Aeroflot operated Ilyushin Il-86 widebody flights during the 1980s and early 1990s between Moscow and such long-range destinations as New York and Havana. Due to the IL-86's limited range of approximately 2,000 mi (3,200 km), the flights made refueling stops at both Shannon and Gander en route to the final destination. The Boeing 747-200s of the same era had typical ranges from 5,000–6,000 mi (8,000–9,700 km) and were much more sought after by international airlines. The IL-86 was used almost exclusively by Aeroflot and successor post-Soviet airlines.
- Air France ran several services through Gander, connecting Paris and Shannon to Montreal, Boston, and New York in the 1950s.
- American Overseas Airlines used Gander as a stop for Lockheed Constellation flights between New York and London from 1947.
- British Overseas Airways Corporation operated Constellations on London-Shannon-Gander-New York, London-Glasgow-Gander-New York, and London-Glasgow-Gander-Montreal routings from 1947. By 1960, the Gander stop was only used as an alternative to a Glasgow or Shannon stop for Bristol Britannia service to Montreal and Toronto.
- Interflug flights between East Germany and Cuba would stop to refuel in Gander, until the airline began using Airbus A310s in 1989.
- KLM used Gander as a stop on Amsterdam-Glasgow-Gander-New York service from 1946.
- Pan American World Airways used Gander as a stop for transatlantic Douglas DC-4 service between New York-Idlewild and Shannon (continuing to London and Lisbon) starting in 1946. Gander remained in use in 1960 as a stop for Douglas DC-7 services between New York and Scandinavia, although other transatlantic flights bypassed Gander by that point.
- Sabena operated Brussels-Shannon-Gander-New York service from 1949 using Douglas DC-6s.
- Scandinavian Airlines operated Stockholm-Oslo/Copenhagen-Prestwick-Gander-New York service from 1946.
- Trans-Canada Air Lines used Gander as a stop for transatlantic service to London from 1946 and also operated local service from Gander to St. John's and Sydney.
- Trans World Airlines operated Boston-Gander-Shannon and Boston-Gander-Azores-Lisbon services from 1947 using Constellations, with onward service to destinations in Europe, the Middle East, and India.

In 1971, runway 04/22 was extended from 8,400 to 10,500 ft (2,560 to 3,200 m) and is now 03/21 at 10,200 ft (3,100 m).

With the advent of jets with longer range in the 1960s, most flights no longer needed to refuel. Gander has decreased in importance, but it remains the home of Gander Control, one of the two air traffic control centres which direct the high-level North Atlantic Tracks. The other is Shanwick Oceanic Control which is split between two sites – one in Prestwick, Scotland and the other in Shannon, Ireland. Most aircraft travelling to and from Europe or North America must talk to at least one of these air traffic controls.

As of 2007, some commercial transatlantic flights still use Gander as a refuelling stop; most notably, some American legacy carriers, United Airlines and Delta Air Lines in particular, who use the Boeing 757 to connect smaller European cities with their major US hubs. The 757 is particularly affected in this respect, as it was not an aircraft intended or designed for transatlantic flights. This practice has been controversial, since strong headwinds over the Atlantic Ocean during the winter months can result in the flights being declared "minimum fuel", forcing refuelling stops at Gander in order to safely complete their journeys.

During the Cold War, Gander was notable for the number of persons from Communist nations who defected there (including Soviet chess player and pianist Igor Vasilyevich Ivanov, Cuban Olympic swimmer Rafael Polinario, and the Vietnamese woman famously photographed as a naked girl fleeing a napalmed village, Phan Thi Kim Phuc). It was one of the few refueling points where the smaller airplanes used by airlines that served the Eastern Bloc could stop en route from Eastern Europe or the Soviet Union to Cuba.

On 12 December 1985, Gander was the site of the Arrow Air Flight 1285R disaster, in which a Douglas DC-8 with 256 on board, mostly soldiers from the US Army 101st Airborne Division, crashed during takeoff, probably due to being overweight and experiencing atmospheric icing; there were no survivors. The crash was, and remains, as of May 2025, the deadliest airplane accident on Canadian soil.

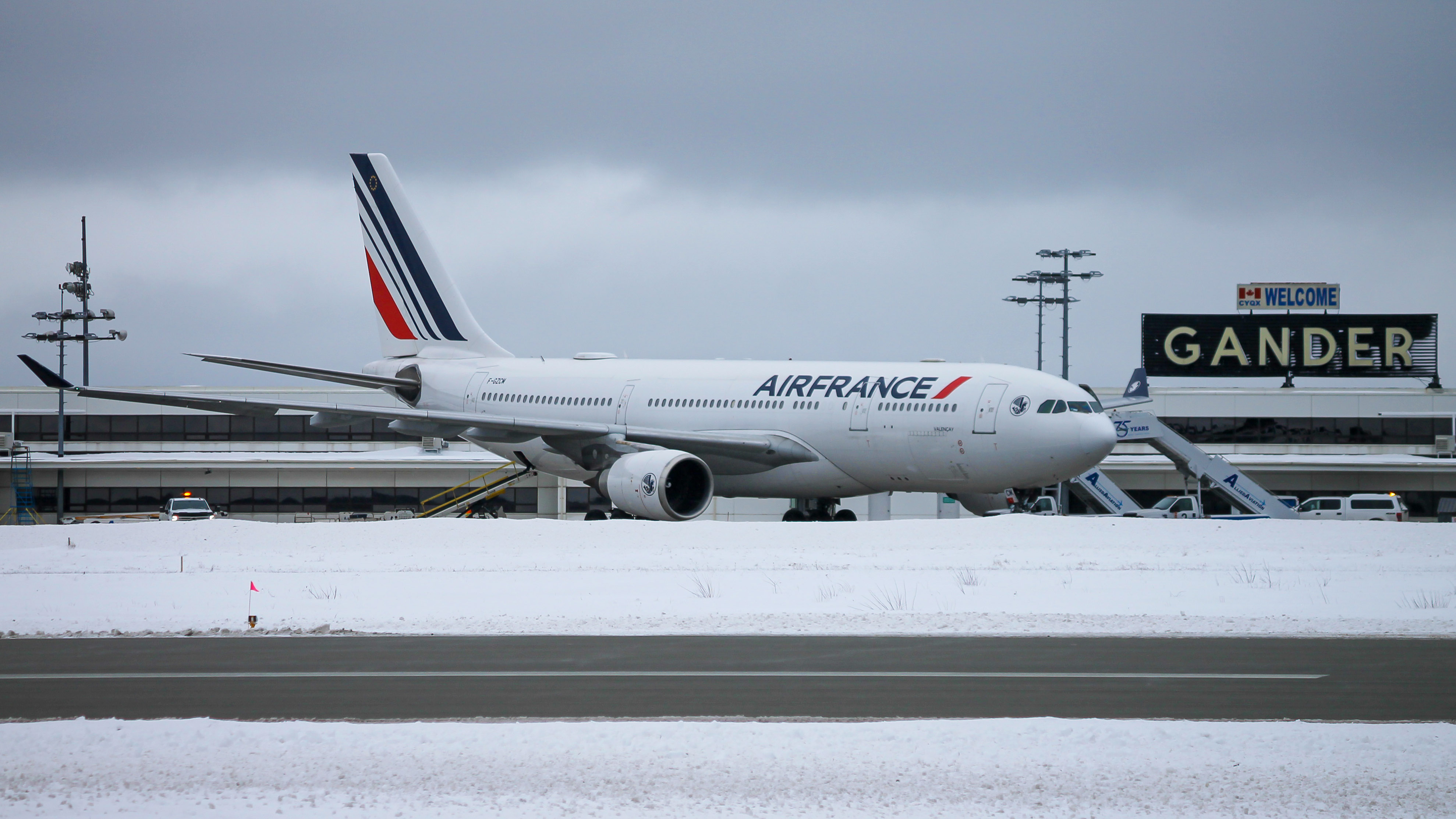
An Air France Airbus A330 parked at Gander in February 2025 after a mechanical issue led to a diversion

Today, Gander remains an important stop for transatlantic flights that require a diversion. The long runways at the airport are a big reason for this, as any aircraft can land at the airport.

=== Aircraft testing ===
The airport has been used historically as a testing site for the testing and development of many aircraft. The use of the airport for crosswind testing, in particular, has led to it being the airport of choice in recent years.

Concorde used the airport in 1974 to test Transatlantic flight capabilities. Passengers were selected from the town population to fly to England and France on test flights, and experience supersonic flight. In September 1975, Concorde G-BOAC made two return trips to Gander in one day, becoming the first aircraft to make four transatlantic crossings in a single day.

Gander became the first Canadian airport at which a Boeing 787 Dreamliner landed, as Boeing used Gander for crosswind testing on the 787-8 in 2011. In 2018, the 787-10 used the airport for crosswind testing as well.

The Bombardier C Series, now known as the Airbus A220, used the airport for testing in 2016.

=== Gander International Airport Authority ===
The Gander International Airport Authority (GIAA; French: Autorité aéroportuaire de Gander) was formed in 1996 by the Government of Canada, which was divesting its direct control of airports across the country to similar operating agencies. Previously, Gander was operated by the Government of Newfoundland from 1938 to 1942 and 1945 to 1949 before transferring to the Government of Canada when Newfoundland became a province. Its mission is to operate the airport in a self-sufficient fashion. It receives its revenues from landing fees on airlines, departure fees on passengers, parking revenues and facility rentals. The revenues are used for operating and capital expenses.

The GIAA only operates the civil airport and does not oversee the nearby Gander (James Paton Memorial Regional Health Centre) Heliport nor CFB Gander.

=== Operation Yellow Ribbon (September 2001) ===
Following the September 11 attacks on September 11, 2001, with United States airspace closed, Gander International played host to 38 airliners, totaling 6,122 passengers and 473 crew, as part of Operation Yellow Ribbon. Gander International received more flights than any other Canadian airport involved in the operation apart from Halifax. The 6,595 passengers and crew accounted for the third highest total of passengers that landed at a Canadian airport involved in the operation, behind Vancouver and Halifax.

A major reason that Gander received so much traffic was its ability to handle large aircraft and because Transport Canada and Nav Canada instructed pilots coming from Europe to avoid major airports in Central Canada, such as Toronto-Pearson and Montréal-Dorval. The reception these travellers received in the central Newfoundland communities near the airport has been one of the most widely reported happy stories surrounding that day.

To honour the people of Gander and Halifax for their support during the operation, Lufthansa named a new Airbus A340-300 "Gander/Halifax" on May 16, 2002. That airplane is listed with the registration D-AIFC, D-AIFC had been diverted to Gander during Operation Yellow Ribbon, and was the first aircraft of that fleet with a city name from outside of Germany. (D-AIFC was withdrawn from use on the 12th of November 2025)

The airport was the site for Canada's memorial service to mark the first anniversary of the attack, over which Prime Minister Jean Chrétien, Transport Minister David Collenette, US Ambassador to Canada Paul Cellucci, and provincial and local officials presided. 2,500 of the 6,600 people that were diverted there the year before also attended the ceremony.

The musical stage show Come from Away and its film adaptation are based around the experiences of residents of Gander in the province of Newfoundland and Labrador and those affected by the forced landings.

== Future ==
Officials at Gander International Airport stated in 2006 that the future for the airport is grim unless the federal government provides funding to cover costs. Over 50% of all aircraft operating from the air field are military, and do not pay landing fees.

The terminal building—built in the 1950s and noted for its modernist design and heritage architecture—still includes many of its original furnishings and fixtures. In April 2014, Gander Airport Authority made plans to abandon the existing terminal building due to high operating costs and replace it with a new terminal a quarter of the size. In 2017, the airport announced the existing terminal would instead be renovated and downsized, at a cost of $26.4 million.

The interior of the international lounge in 2025

In 2022 the original international lounge was reopened to public after a renovation. The international lounge, which opened in 1959, still features mid-century modern furniture by Arne Jacobsen and Jacques Guillon, terrazzo floors and a large mural by the artist Kenneth Lochhead. It had previously been listed on the National Trust for Canada's Endangered Places List. Writing in the New York Times in 2006, the Montreal writer Adam Gollner referred to it as "one of the most beautiful and important Modernist rooms in the country – if not the most important". It is a registered heritage property in Newfoundland and Labrador.

== Facilities ==
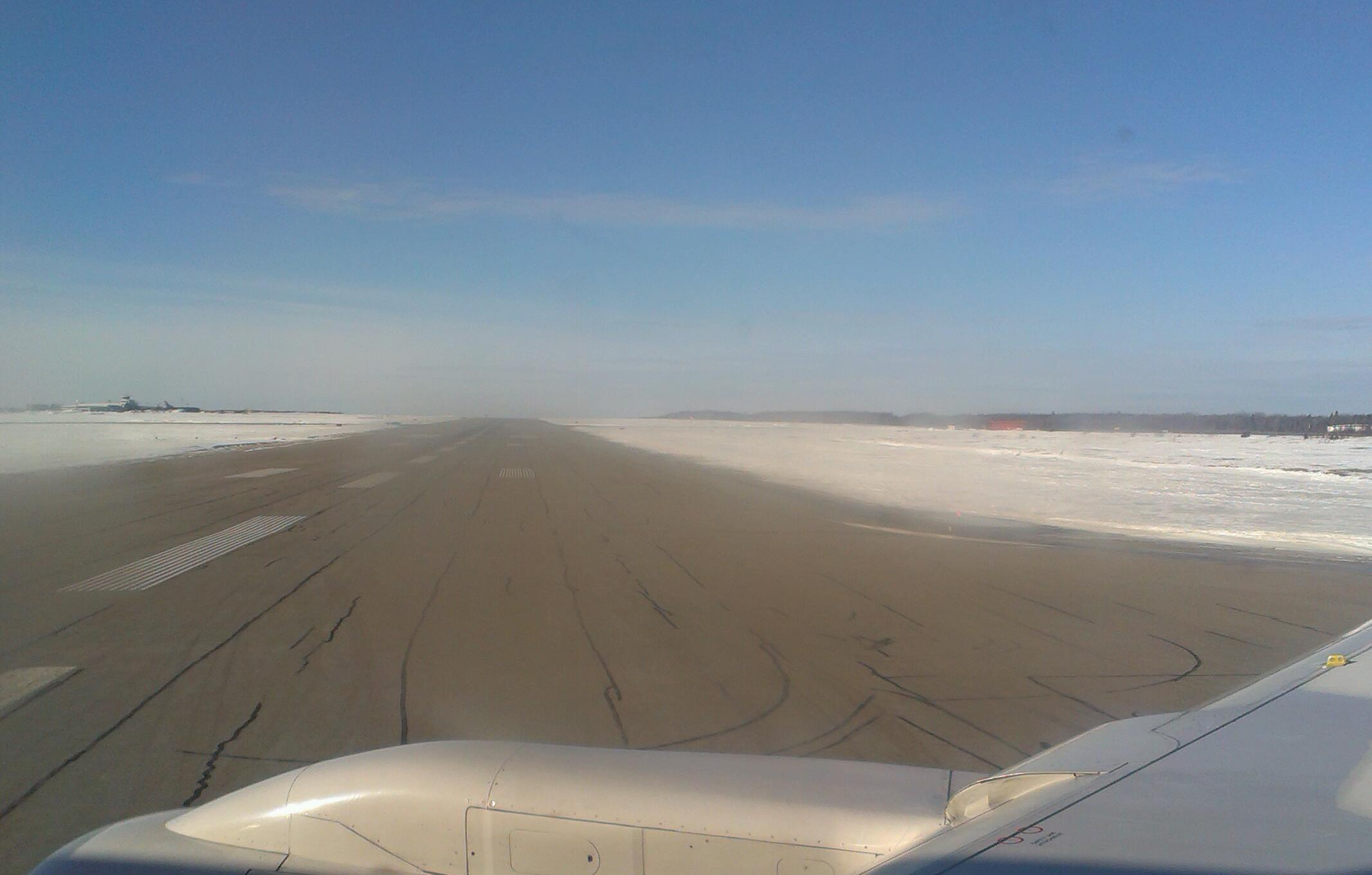
Runway at Gander International Airport

=== Runways ===
Gander has two active runways: runway 13/31 which is 8,900 ft × 200 ft (2,713 m × 61 m), and runway 03/21 (changed from 04/22 in August 2004) which measures 10,200 ft × 200 ft (3,109 m × 61 m) and underwent a $10 million comprehensive rehabilitation project, completed in September 2012.

The airport's runway 03/21 was designated as an emergency landing runway for NASA's Space Shuttle orbiter. The airport is also an important emergency landing runway for large aircraft in transatlantic operation in the ETOPS system, which requires aircraft to always be within a specified distance from a suitable alternate landing site in case of engine failure. For many two-engine aircraft this is two or three hours with malfunction in one engine.

=== Fire services ===
Gander Airport Safety and Airside Operations is responsible for fire and rescue operations using three vehicles at their station within the airport. It also has a mutual aid agreement with the Town of Gander Fire Department to provide additional fire fighting services.

=== Planespotting and photography ===
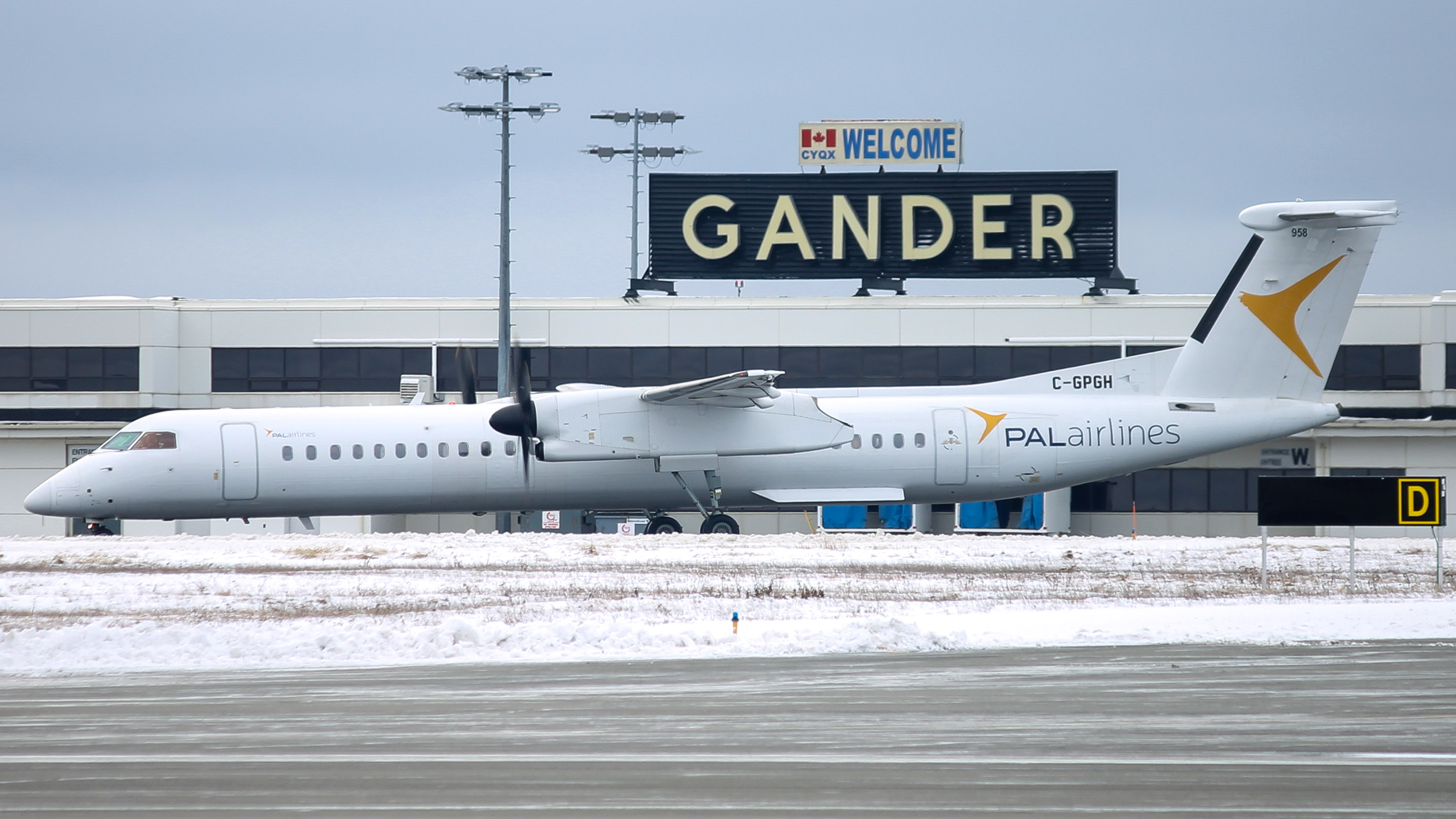
A PAL Airlines Dash 8-400 taxiing for takeoff at Gander, as seen from the spotting area

A designated area for aviation photographers was built by the Airport Authority. It is located parallel to runway 13/31 on the north side of the airfield. It consists of a parking lot and designated places for photographers to have unobstructed shots of aircraft arriving and departing with the full terminal as a backdrop.

== Airlines and destinations ==
Airlines	Destinations
Air Canada Express	Halifax; Seasonal: Montréal–Trudeau, Toronto–Pearson
PAL Airlines	Churchill Falls, Goose Bay, St. John's, Wabush; Seasonal: Deer Lake

== Fixed-base operators ==
The following fixed-base operators (FBOs) are based at Gander International Airport:

=== Public ===
- Allied Aviation Services
- Woodward Aviation
- Gander Aviation
- Irving Aviation Services

== Accidents and incidents ==
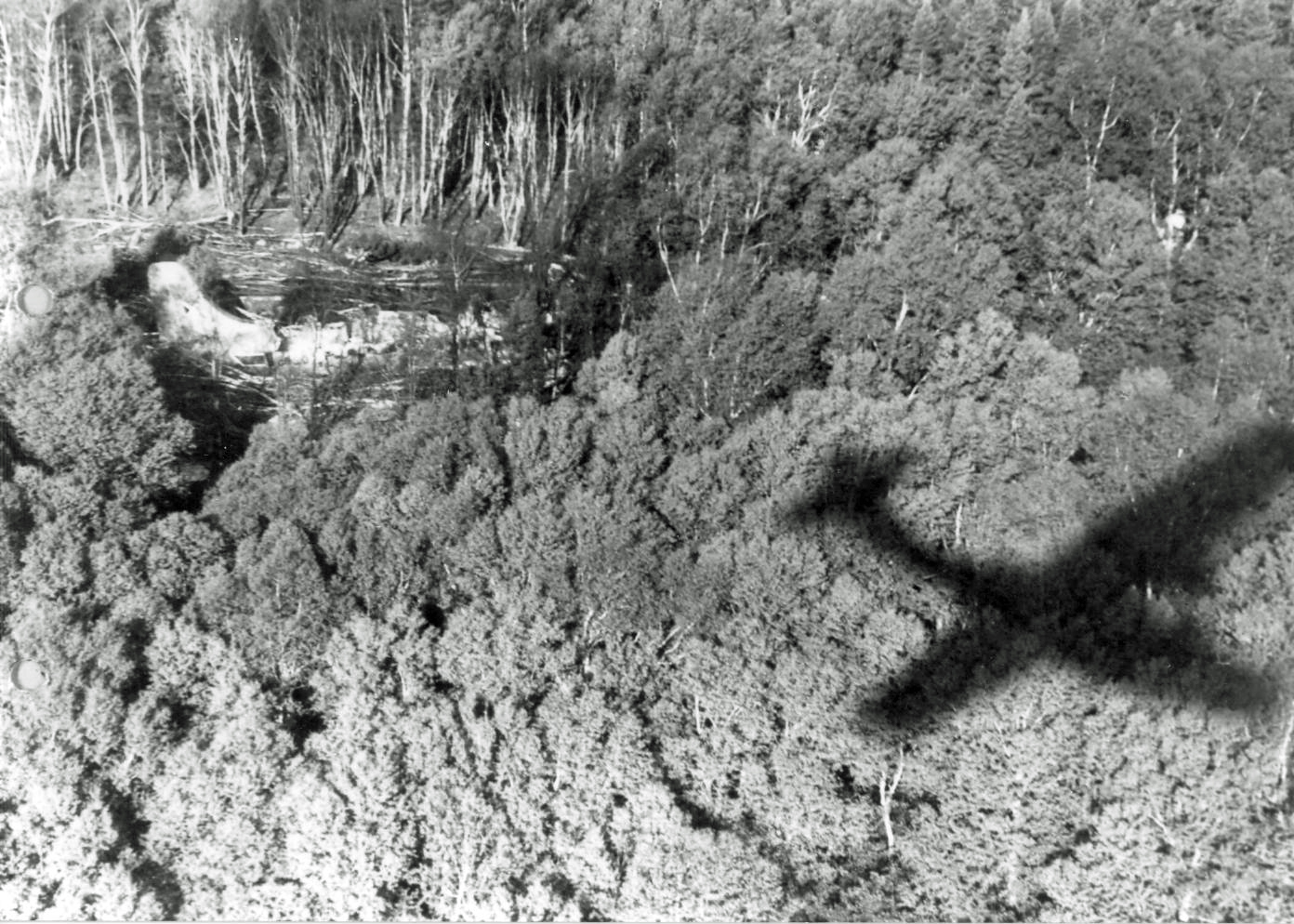
The 1946 crash site of the DC-4

- On 21 February 1941, three people were killed when a Lockheed L-14 Super Electra/Hudson departing from Gander crashed near Musgrave Harbour after both of the plane's engines failed. The fatalities include Sir Frederick Grant Banting who died of wounds and exposure. The navigator and co-pilot died instantly, but Banting and the pilot, Captain Joseph Mackey, survived the initial impact. According to Mackey, the sole survivor, Banting died from his injuries the next day.
- On 6 January 1943, a Consolidated Aircraft 28-5MC Canso (PBY-5) of the Royal Canadian Air Force clipped the tops of trees after takeoff and crashed killing five of the seven crew on board.
- On 5 May 1943, a Canadian Vickers PBV-1A Canso A (PBY-5A), CV-241, of the Royal Canadian Air Force lost height and impacted wooded terrain shortly after takeoff from runway 15 killing six of the seven crew on board.
- On 8 May 1943, a Lockheed C-60A Lodestar of the Royal Canadian Air Force crashed on approach to Gander killing all three crew members.
- On 4 September 1943, a Consolidated B-24 Liberator 1524, c/n 589 from No. 10 Squadron of the Royal Canadian Air Force crashed into Gander Lake immediately after takeoff killing the entire crew.
- On 18 September 1946, 27 people died when a Sabena Douglas DC-4 (OO-CBG) crashed 35 km short of Gander Airport, where the aircraft planned to land for a refueling stop on the flight from Brussels to New York. At the time of the accident (07:42 UTC), there was dense fog near the airport, and the pilot executed a flawed approach at too low an altitude. There were 17 survivors (16 passengers and one crew).
- On Wednesday 5 May 1948, a Douglas C-47A-30-DK, NC17645, of Superior Oil Company departed from Gander en route to Shannon Airport and disappeared over the Atlantic Ocean with three fatalities.
- On 18 April 1953, a Lockheed Ventura, CF-FAW, with four crew members of Spartan Air Services disappeared after departing Gander on a flight to Ottawa.
- On 25 August 1954, a Lockheed L-749 Constellation F-BAZI of Air France of flight AF075 on the Paris–Shannon–Gander–New York–Mexico City route overran the runway and crashed into a ravine upon landing.
- On Thursday 18 March 1965, Douglas C-47A-30-DK, N4997E, of Miami Aviation departed Gander for Santa Maria, Portugal and crashed into the Trinity Bay area killing the two crewmembers on board.
- On 5 September 1967 an Ilyushin Il-18 (registration OK-WAI) of Czechoslovak State Airlines flight 523 crashed on climbout heading east on runway 13 while on a Prague-Shannon-Gander-Havana passenger service, killing 37 of 69 on board; the cause was never determined.
- On 12 December 1985 Arrow Air Flight 1285R crashed on take-off from the then runway 22. The disaster claimed the lives of all 8 crew members and 248 soldiers of the United States Army's 101st Airborne Division who were returning home for Christmas from a peacekeeping deployment in the Middle East. The impact on the south side of the Trans-Canada Highway on the shore of Gander Lake left a charred clearing in the forest where a memorial now stands to those who died in Canada's deadliest air crash.
- On 17 December 1998 an Antonov An-124, RA-82046 of Volga-Dnepr Airlines landed on runway 13 and slid off the runway and came to rest 60 metres from the button of runway 31. The aircraft was embedded in mud and No. 4 engine caught fire.
- On 20 April 2016, Air Canada Express flight 7804 (EV7804), which was operated by an EVAS Air Beechcraft 1900D (C-FEVA) crashed upon landing on runway 03. At the time of arrival, the weather conditions were described as "heavy snow" and the visibility at the airport was 1/8 statute mile (200 m) visibility. The flight, arriving from Goose Bay, touched down right of the runway centerline, and veered right. The nose gear of the aircraft struck a snow windrow and subsequently collapsed, causing seven of the eight blades of the propellers to separate from the engine. On the right side of the aircraft, a piece of propeller blade punctured the aircraft. Of the 14 occupants onboard, (12 passengers and 2 crew) everyone survived, and 3 people sustained minor injuries.
- On 10 March 2022, a CH-149 Cormorant of 103 Search and Rescue Squadron crashed during a training exercise, injuring all six crew members.

== See also ==
- North Atlantic Aviation Museum
