= William Armistead =

William Armitstead may refer to:

- William Armistead (burgess) (died c. 1716), represented Elizabeth City, Virginia in the Virginia House of Burgesses
- William Armistead (1754–1793), slave owner and namesake of former slave and spy James Armistead Lafayette
- William Armistead (1762–1842), Revolutionary war veteran and Alabama pioneer
- William Martin Armistead (1873–1955), publicist for the N. W. Ayer & Son advertising agency
  - William Martin Armistead House

== See also ==
- William Armitstead (1833–1907), English cricketer
