= Ayer =

Ayer may refer to:

== Places ==
- Ayer, Massachusetts, United States
  - Ayer (CDP), Massachusetts, the central village in the town of Ayer
  - Ayer (MBTA station), commuter rail station
- Ayer, Washington, United States
- Aller, Asturias, a municipality in Spain known in Asturian as Ayer
- Ayer, Switzerland, a municipality in the Val d'Anniviers, canton of Valais

== People ==
- Ayer (surname)
- Iyer (also spelled Ayer or Ayyar), a Hindu Brahmin community from India

== Music ==
- "Ayer" (Enrique Iglesias song), a song by Enrique Iglesias
- "Ayer" (Gloria Estefan song), by singer-songwriter Gloria Estefan
- "Ayer" (Luis Miguel song), 1993 song by Luis Miguel
- "Ayer", 1992 song by Juan Luis Guerra and 440 from the album Areíto
- "In the Ayer" by rappers Flo Rida, Tiffany Villarreal, and will.i.am

== Other uses ==
- N. W. Ayer & Son, the first advertising agency in the United States

== See also ==
- Ayar (disambiguation)
- Ayyar (disambiguation)
- Iyengar (disambiguation)
- Iyar (disambiguation)
