= Savoy Theatre, Glace Bay =

Performance Theatre in Glace Bay, Nova Scotia, Canada

Savoy Theatre
- Logo of the Savoy Theatre

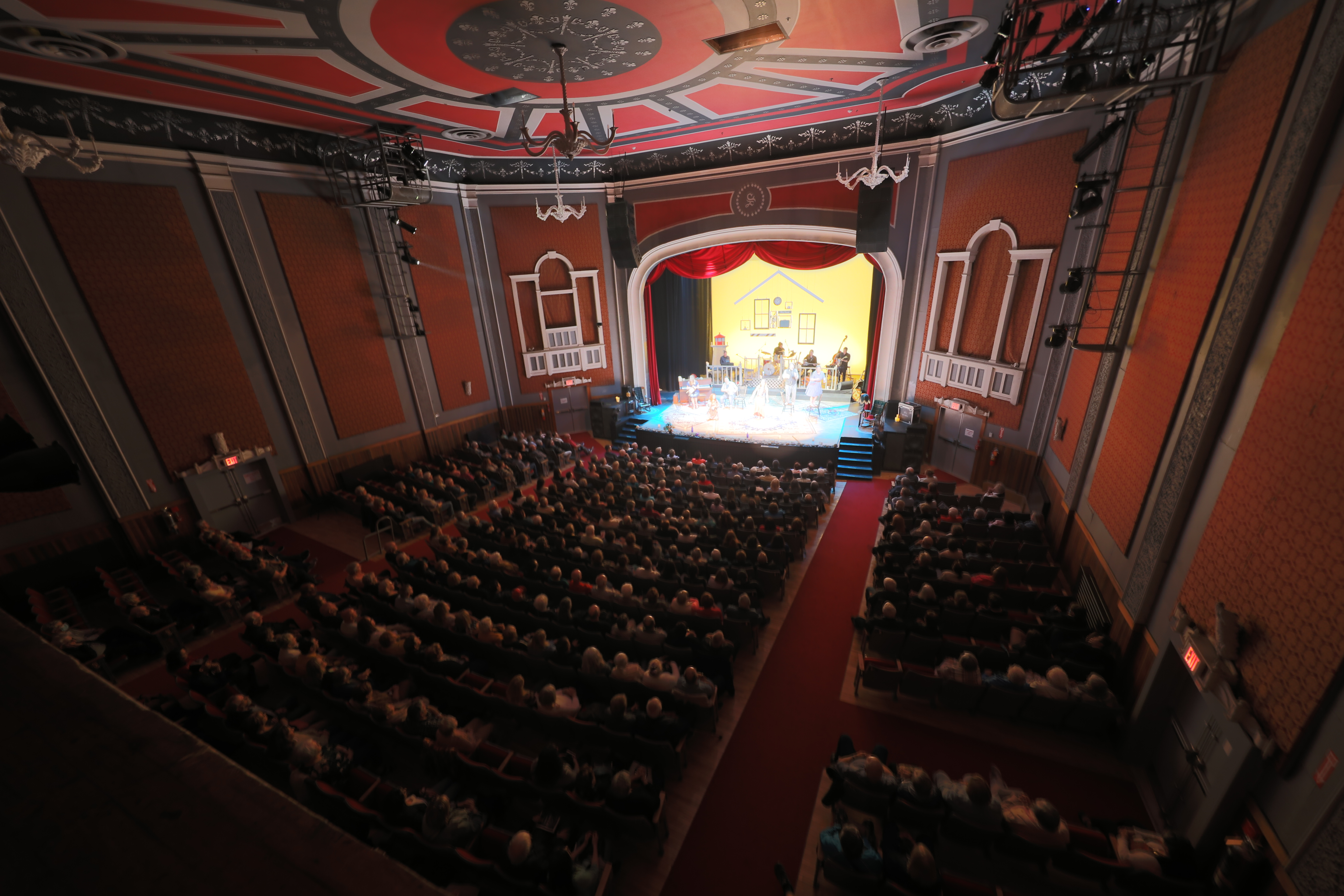
- The main auditorium of the Savoy Theatre
- Interactive map of Savoy Theatre
- Address: 116 Commercial Street, Glace Bay, Nova Scotia, Canada
- Location: Cape Breton Island, Nova Scotia, Canada
- Coordinates: 46.196333°N 59.957333°W
- Owner: The Savoy Theatre Society
- Operator: The Savoy Theatre Society
- Seating type: soft seat, reserved seating
- Capacity: 761 (585 orchestra, 206 balcony, 1994–present): 875 (1976–1991); 1290 (826 orchestra, 464 balcony, 1927–1974)
- Type: Theatre
- Events: live theatre, music, concerts, dance, film
- Screen: 1
- Production: Come from Away, Aug. 25-31, 2025; Frozen (musical), Feb. 13-15, 2026
- Public transit: Transit Cape Breton; Routes 1, 2, 3

Construction
- Built: 1927; 1901 (former structure)
- Opened: 1927; 1901 (former structure)
- Renovated: 1974–1976
- Expanded: 1997–1998
- Architect: Frank MacSween
- General contractor: (Frank) MacSween Contractors

Website
- www.savoytheatre.com

The Savoy Theatre is a historic Victorian-Style theatre, first established in 1901, with the present theatre building dating from 1927. The Savoy is located in Glace Bay, Cape Breton Regional Municipality, on Cape Breton Island, in the province of Nova Scotia, Canada, and operates as a performing arts venue, presenting a wide variety of local, national, and international entertainment.

The Savoy is one of the largest soft-seat theatres in Nova Scotia. Its main auditorium has a capacity of 761, including the balcony. The Savoy's foyer also hosts events (dinner theatres, weddings, reunions) for up to 100 people. The Savoy is managed by The Savoy Theatre Society, an arms-length agency and registered charity created by the former Town of Glace Bay.

== History ==
=== The First Savoy Theatre ===
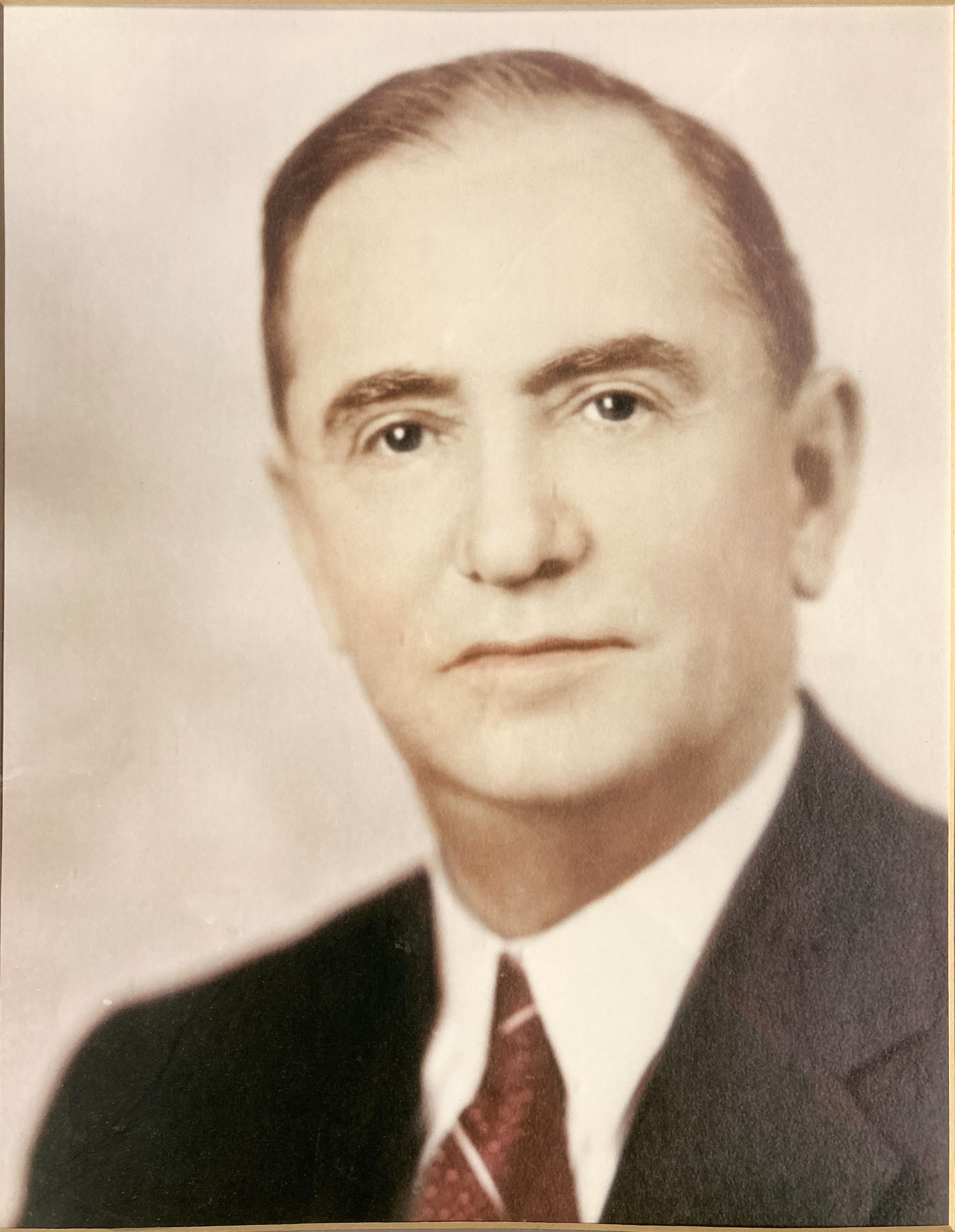
John Owen Connor, founder, Savoy Theatre

The original Savoy Theatre was built on Union Street in Glace Bay in 1901 by businessman John Owen Connor as a vaudeville house. It was at first an 'upstairs' theatre on the second floor of an office building and remained so until 1920 when it was remodeled and brought down to ground level. At the time, it had an orchestra pit, balcony, and ornate domed ceiling.

Vaudeville was staged at the Savoy, along with magic shows, musicals, concerts (both sacred and secular), political meetings, and rallies. The large stage could easily accommodate a 24-foot boxing ring with ringside bleachers, leading to the Savoy hosting the 1921 Maritime Boxing Championships. One hundred and four boxers performed in a two-night show that lasted into the early hours of the morning.

=== The 1927 Fire and The New Savoy Theatre ===
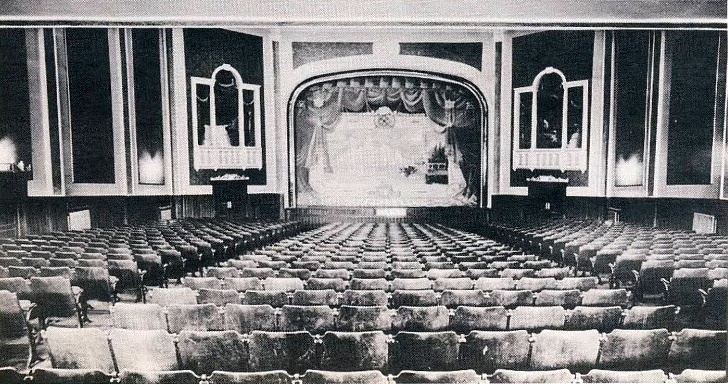
The Savoy Theater cir. 1947

On Sunday, 27 March of 1927, the old Savoy was destroyed by fire. The flames, started by an electric iron in a tailor's shop and fanned by a northeast blizzard, levelled an entire block of buildings as firemen were unable to contain the blaze. It was the worst fire the town ever experienced, with the losses approaching half a million dollars. In all, seven buildings were completely destroyed, with a number of others receiving damage. The loss was quite a heavy one to John Connor. The Savoy Theatre building was valued at $65,000, but Connor's insurance only amounted to $25,000 in coverage. Nevertheless, he quickly began rebuilding its replacement.

The new Savoy Theatre, constructed to the specifications of the famed Victorian show houses, was reopened offering an evening of entertainment, including Tom Mix and Tony the Wonder Horse in The Great K & A Train Robbery, along with "Fire Fighters" Chapter II, Jack of All Trades, a Felix the Cat Cartoon, and Fox News, on 28th October 1927, only seven months after the fire that destroyed its predecessor. Designed and built by (Frank) MacSween Contractors, the new theatre was complete with seating for 1,290 patrons (826 on the auditorium orchestra floor and 464 on the balcony) and displayed elaborate decorations, including rococo chandeliers and wall sconces. John Connor's wife, Agnes Connor, sewed all the long draperies for the theatre herself. The stage was equipped with a "hemp" fly system (a.k.a. rope line common to the period) contained in the fly loft above the stage, as well as an elaborately painted fire curtain.

In the early days, the Savoy Theatre had its own orchestra for silent films, with one of John Connor's daughters, Annie Connor, playing the piano. Sound for movies was introduced in 1930. Through the Great Depression, both the Russell and Savoy Theatres in Glace Bay had a period of closure due to lack of patronage, a result of decreased employment in the area.

For the next few decades the Savoy operated both as a movie theatre and as a vaudeville house, and hosted many of the world's finest entertainers, including W. C. Fields, The Dumbells, The Mae Edwards Players, The Great Lester, and a young Sammy Davis Jr. (in 1937 at the age of 12). The Savoy was also the preferred location for boxing matches and other large-scale spectacles.

Through this period the Savoy continued to be managed by its owner, John Connor, and later by his son, Edgar Connor.

=== Famous Players ownership ===
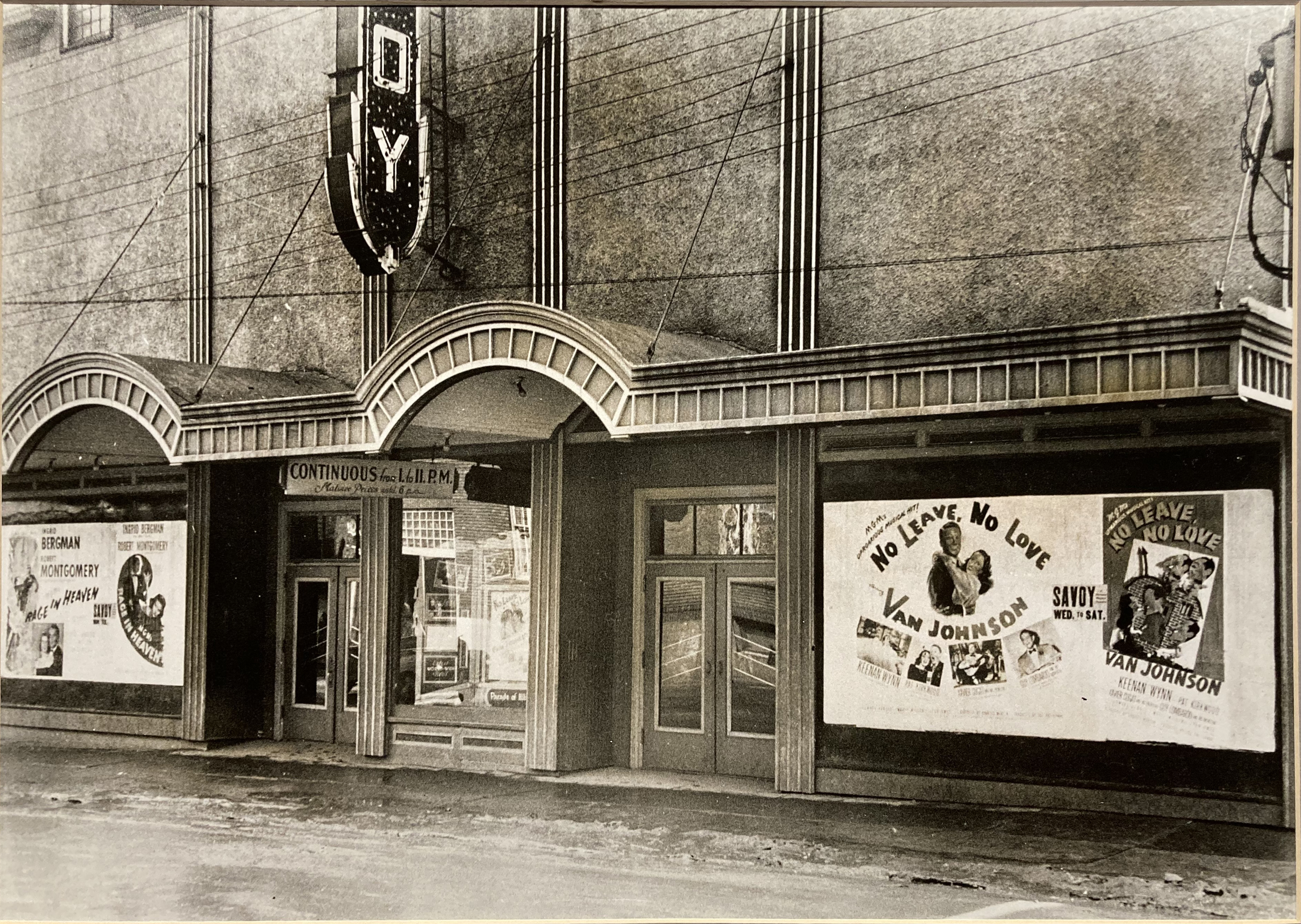
The Savoy Theatre cir. 1950

In the late 1940s or early 1950s, owner John Connor (and later, his wife) contracted with Famous Players Canadian Corporation to operate the Savoy as a Famous Players Movie Theatre. John Owen Connor died on 12 February 1946 at the age of 67.

Early in 1953, the Savoy underwent repairs that included a complete reseating and renovation of the interior. The theatre continued to operate while the repairs were carried out.

In December of 1956, Kenneth Williamson become manager of the Savoy, replacing Edgar Connor. Around this time, Famous Players assumed ownership and complete control of the venue, which then operated exclusively as a movie theatre.

== Restoration ==
=== 1974 Purchase by The Town of Glace Bay ===
In 1974 the Town of Glace Bay purchased the theatre from Famous Players for $45,000 with the intention of restoring it for community use. Both federal and provincial funding was secured, allowing the town to begin a renovation program to restore the Savoy, under the guidance of Mandel Sprachman, the Toronto architect who restored the city's legendary Elgin and Winter Garden Theatres to their original splendour. The renovations followed along the lines of the original building and no major changes were made to the superstructure. The ornate rococo chandeliers were retained and refurbished, and new sound and projection equipment was installed. The stage equipment, including hemp line sets, dressing-rooms and other facilities were updated. The restoration cost close to $600,000 to complete.

=== Opening Night ===
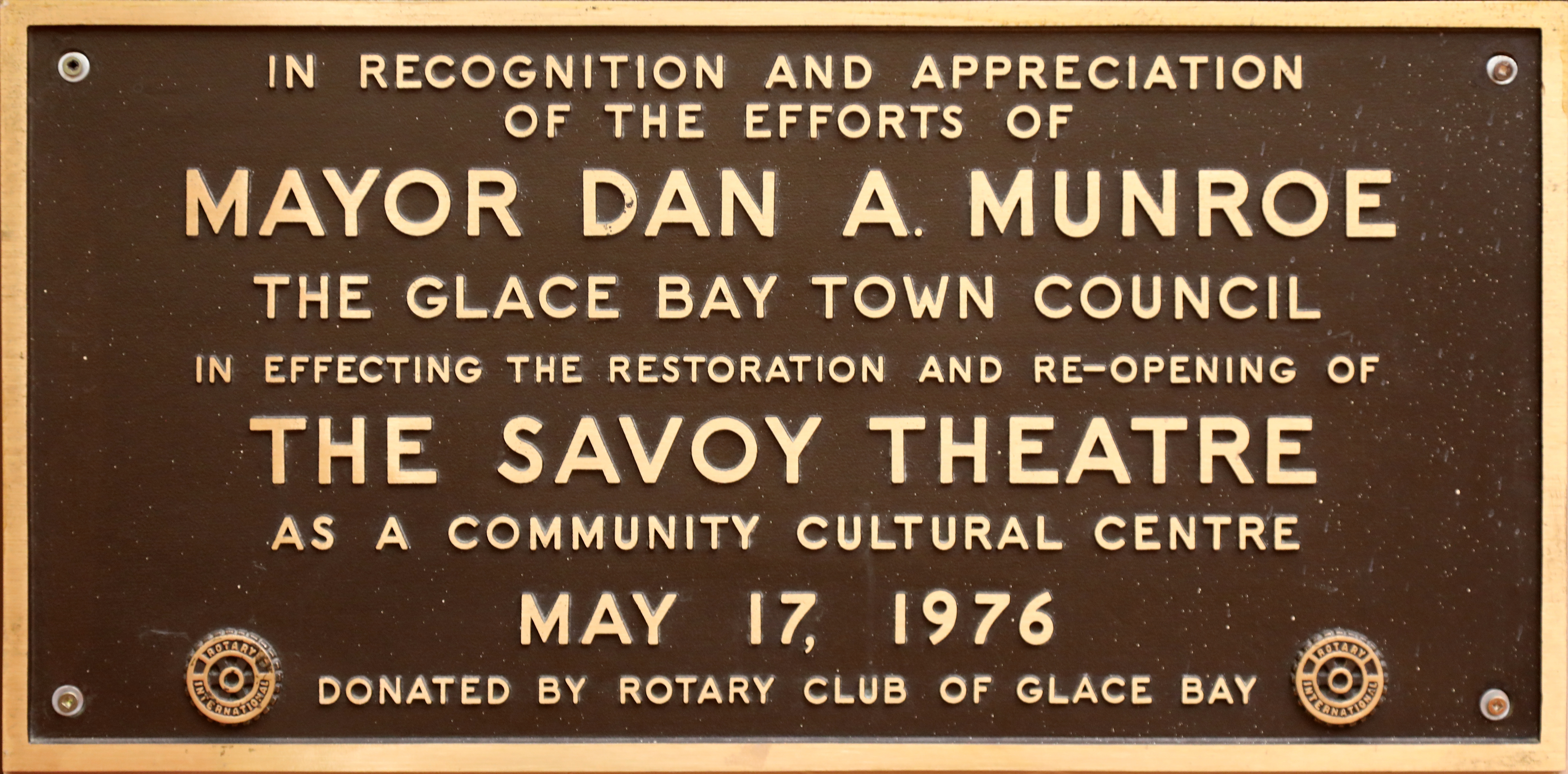
1976 Dedication Plaque

The restored Savoy, now seating 875, was officially opened by Mayor Dan A Munroe and the Glace Bay Town Council on 17 May 1976, with Lieutenant-Governor Clarence Gosse, Premier Gerald Regan, and leader of the Opposition John Buchanan of Nova Scotia in attendance.

The Glace Bay and Sydney Rotary clubs combined to mount a ten-day performance the Rodgers and Hammerstein musical The King and I, directed by Don Gillies, which at the time broke all box office records in the province. A large contingent of patrons travelled from Sydney via the Devco steam railway with No. 42 arriving at the Glace Bay Station shortly after 7 p.m. This group was escorted from the station to Union Street by the MacDougall Girl's Pipe Band. Ann Terry provided live radio coverage of the event while the Donkin Band provided music in front of the theatre prior to show time. One special guest was CBC Newscaster Lloyd Robertson.

=== 1991 fire and 1993 reopening ===
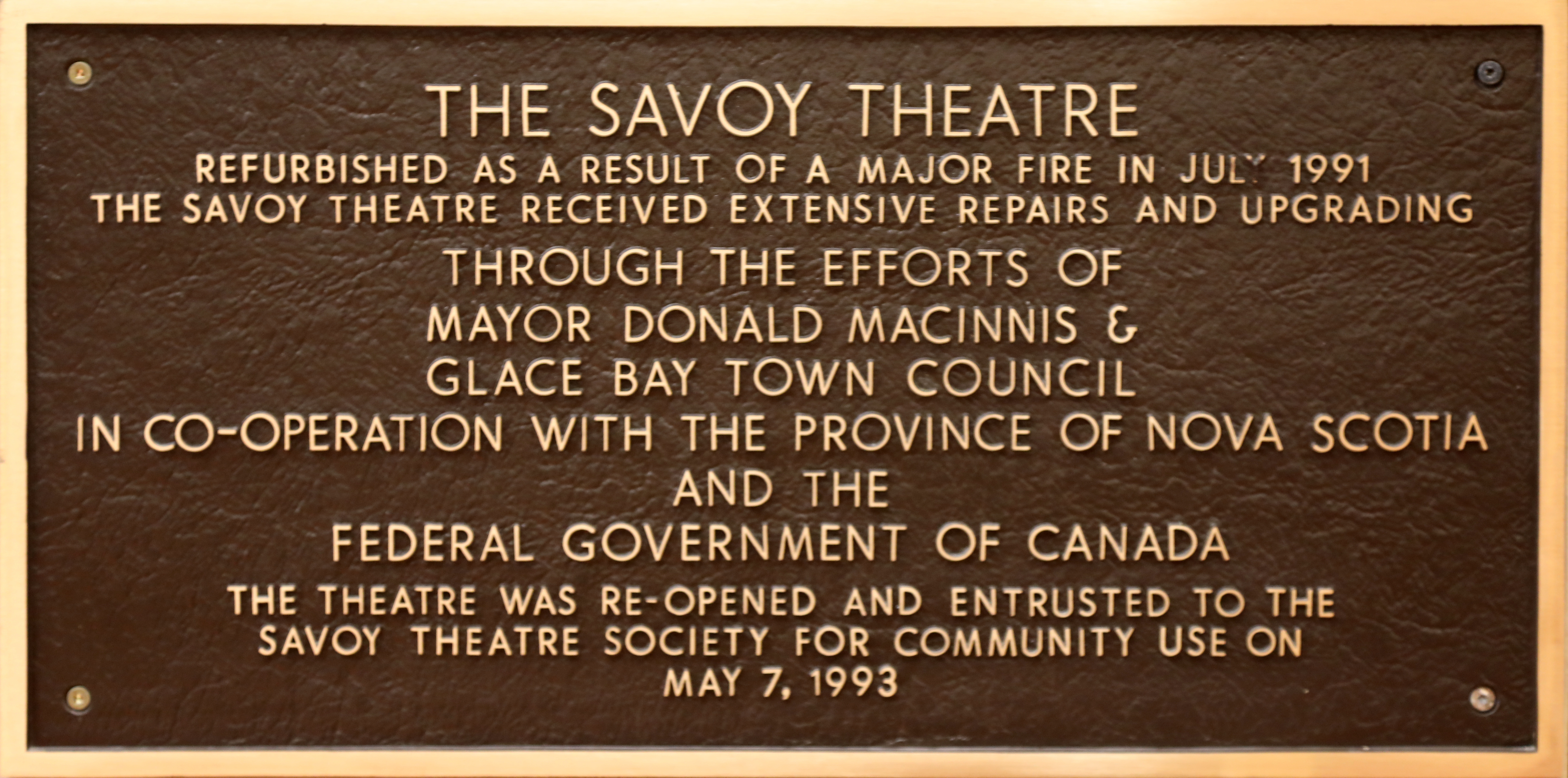
1993 Dedication Plaque

The Savoy Theatre sustained damage as a result of a fire on Sunday, 2 June, 1991. The fire appeared to have originated in the wiring in or around a Floor Pocket (a receptacle set into the stage floor). The fire ran under the stage floor to the rear wall of the stage house where it shot up the 60 feet toward the roof. The fire was reported by a passing taxi driver around 5:00 am that morning and firemen were able to extinguish the fire before the building was lost. Most of the fire damage was contained to the dressing rooms located below the stage, the back wall, and a portable trailer located at the rear of the stage house. The damage was extensive and costly. There was smoke and water damage to other areas of the theatre but the structure remained sound.

Mandel Sprachman, the architect who oversaw the 1974 renovations, was flown in from the United States for an initial assessment of the damage. Richard A D Smerdon's Theatre Consulting Group was contracted to assist in the coordination of repairs.

In addition to the repairs required from the fire, the Savoy Theatre had additional upgrades completed at this time, including the addition of a backstage scene shop, production offices, and green room at the rear of the stage house, upgrades to the dressing rooms, a restored and reopened orchestra pit, and replacement of both the sound and lighting systems. The stage equipment, including hemp line sets and the cable winch and controls for the fire curtain were updated. The balcony floor was further raised in tiers to improve sight lines. Pembroke Construction was hired to carry out the restoration work which cost $1.3 million dollars.

On completion of the work a Grand Re-Opening was held as a 3-day celebration, and ran from 7 to 9 May 1993.

=== 1997–1998 expansion ===
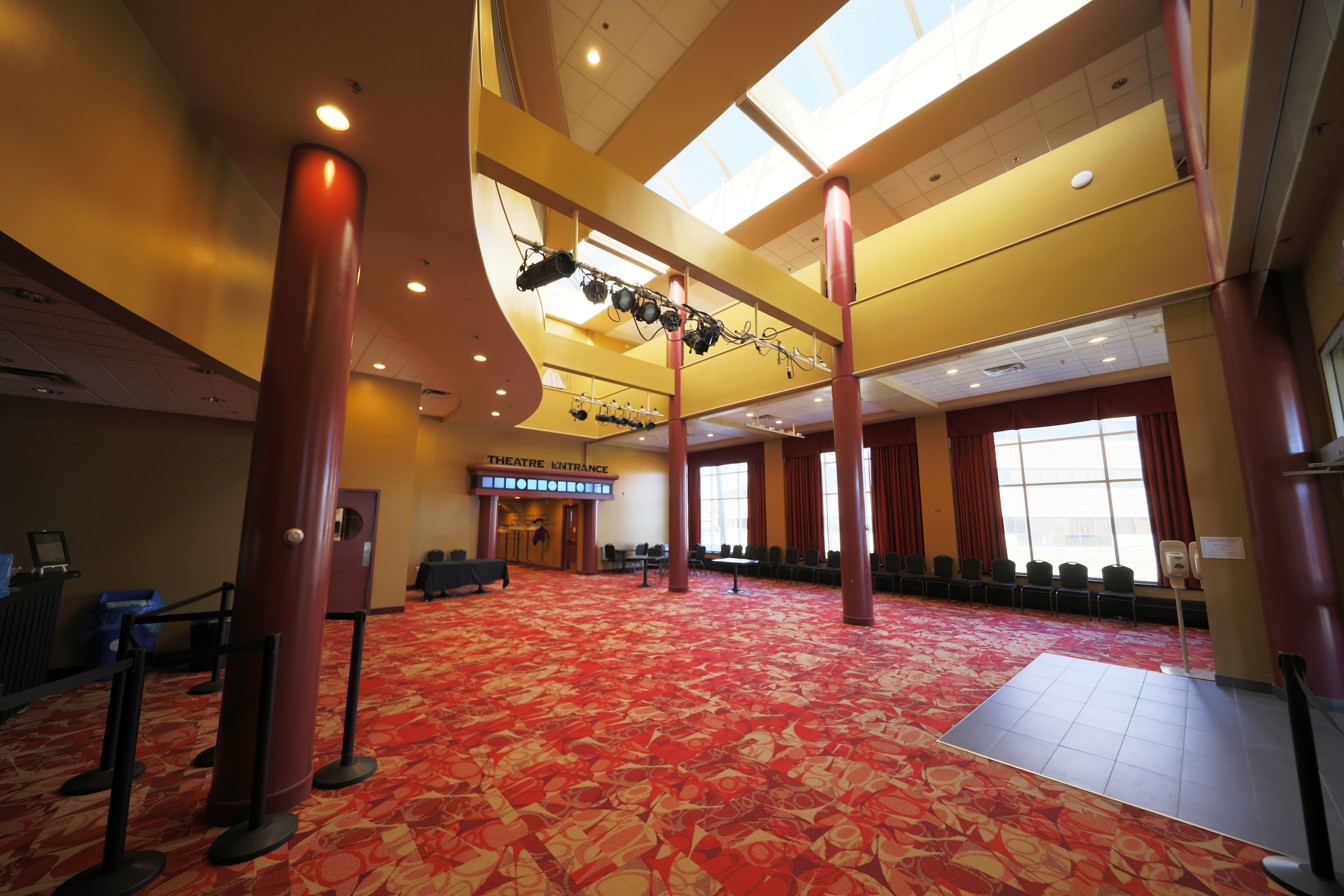
Foyer (Lobby) Annex

A further 2.3 million capital expansion project in 1997 saw the addition of a 50' x 65' two story glassed annex with a portable stage for small events, seating up to 150. The new addition moved the theater entrance to the corner of Union and Commercial Streets and included a new box office, a commercial kitchen, a gift shop, bar facilities, expanded washrooms including an accessible washroom, an elevator, along with a gallery space on the second floor, and expanded administration office space. A sprinkler system was installed and the main auditorium's ceiling was reconstructed and repainted with smaller details including the fleur-de-lys and daisies from the original 1927 ceiling highlighted in silver. The Savoy stayed open through the 18 months of renovations and on completion a ribbon cutting and concert were held on 13 June 1998 to celebrate the new space.

=== 2012 fly tower decommissioning and stage truss installation ===
By the early 2010s the hemp/sandbag fly system that moved stage scenery, curtains, and lights above the stage was struggling to deal with the increasingly heavy weight of touring shows, and was putting a significant strain on the ageing stage house wooden roof system. An engineer was brought in and recommended changes.

The long term plan was to replace the hemp flys with a double-purchase counterweight system. For the shorter term, the immediate solution was to decommission the existing hemp fly system and install a floor supported aluminium stage truss system, including six chain hoists that allow the complete truss system to be raised to show height, or lowered to the stage floor for show preparation. The truss system cost close to $100,000, and was paid for by a combination of fundraising by the theatre, and government funding.

=== 2018-2019 upgrades ===
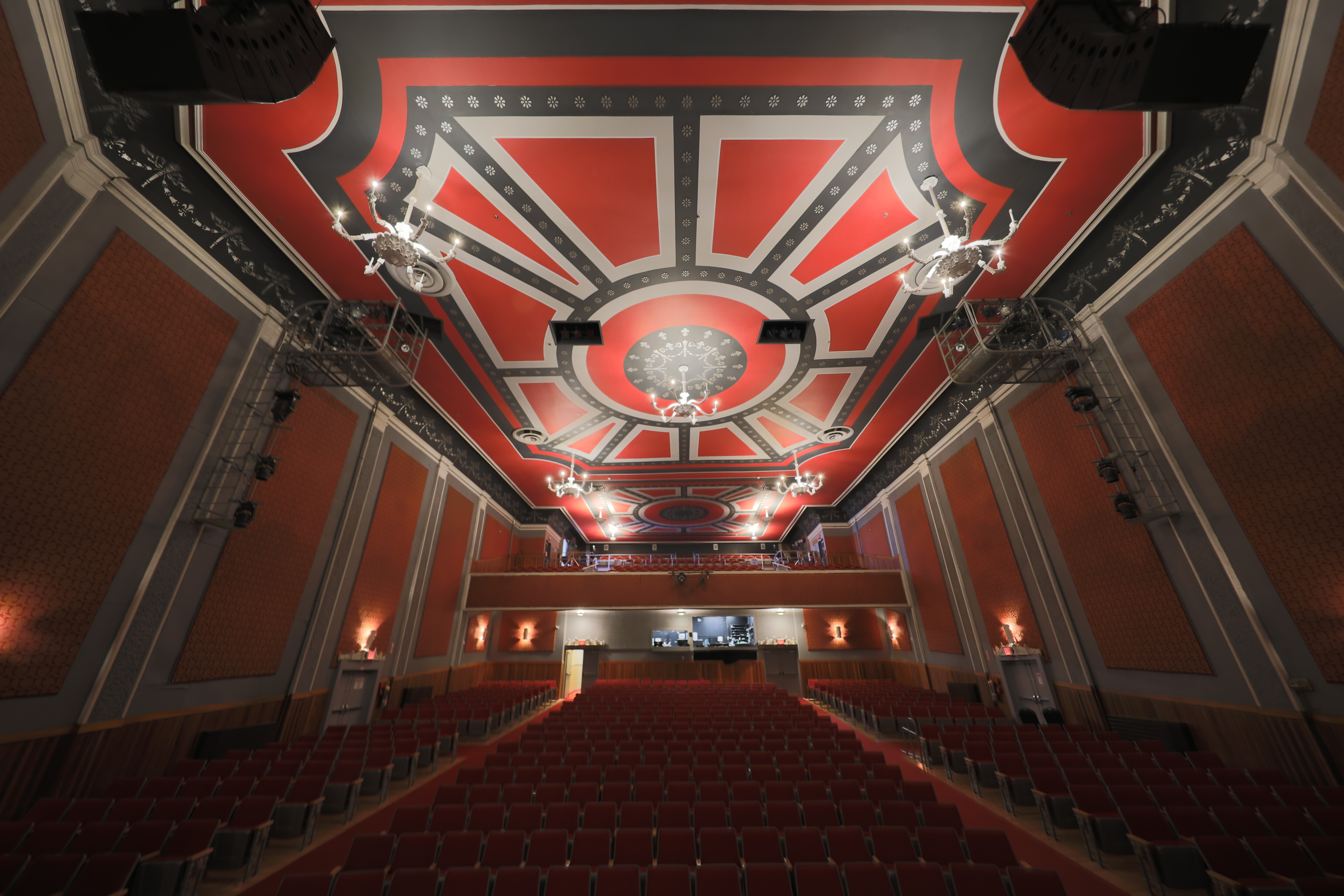
The Auditorium

The most recent upgrades occurred between 2018 and 2019. With the help of $2.93 million in funding from the federal and provincial governments the Savoy modernized many key aspects of the theatre. These renovations included much improved insulation and modernized heating and air conditioning throughout the building, renovations to the lobby area, repairs to the foundation, new performer/production washrooms equipped with showers, remodeling of the dressing rooms and the Green Room, renovated public washrooms on both the main level and balcony level, upgrades to outdoor lighting and canopy, a new metal roof, and upgrades to all sound and lighting systems.

The Savoy remained open and shows continued while the upgrades were completed.

== The Savoy Theatre today ==
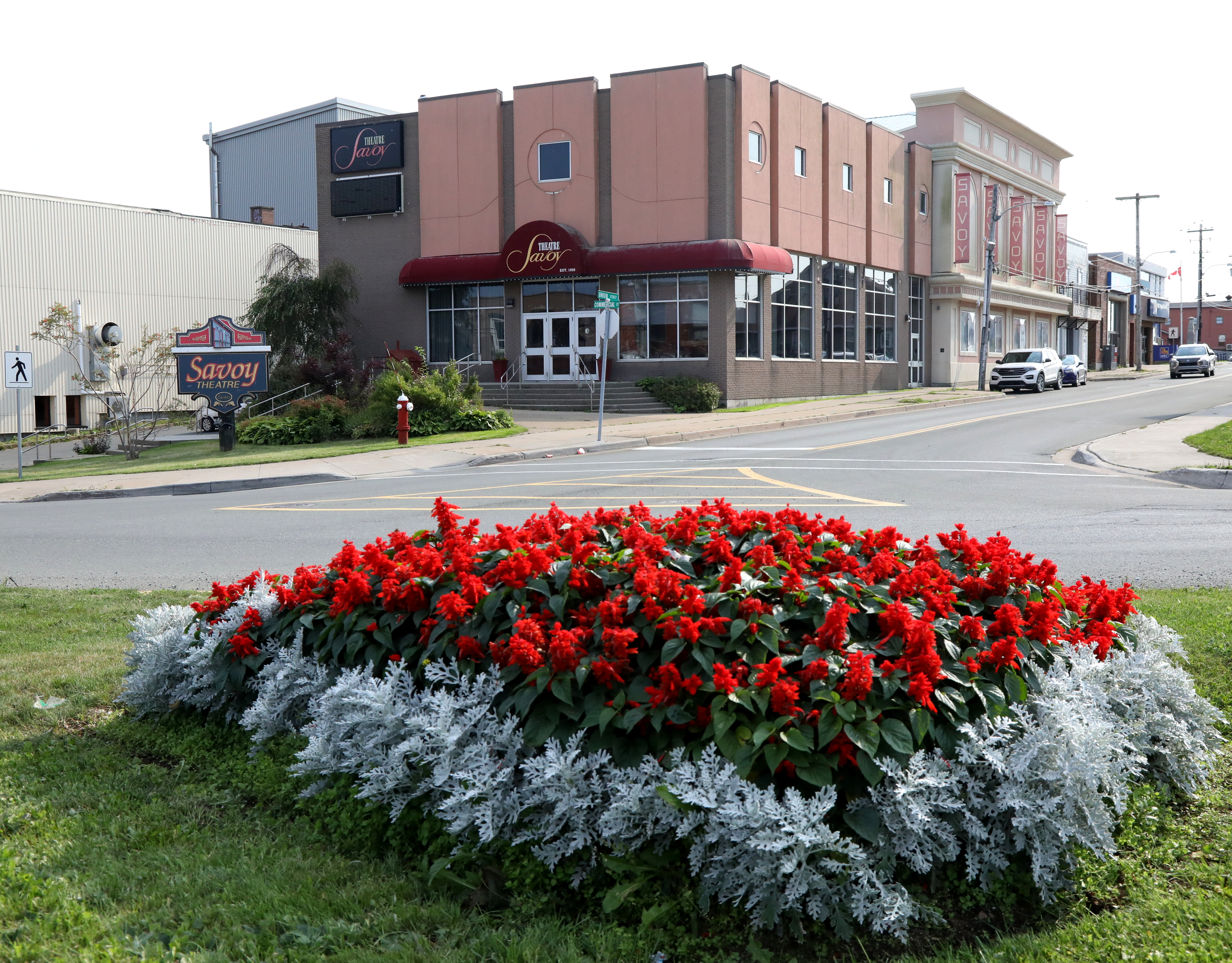
Savoy Theatre at the corner of Union and Commercial Streets, Glace Bay, NS

Since then, the Savoy has provided a wide variety of culture entertainment. Over 40,000 people attend performances at the Savoy Theatre each year.

“The Savoy has been providing entertainment for Cape Breton for 90 years which is a big milestone,” says Pam Leader, executive director of Glace Bay's Savoy Theatre. “There aren't many other theatres this old - the Imperial in St. John may be 100 - the Savoy is definitely one of the oldest live theatre venues in Canada and we're still going strong.”

The Savoy stage has been graced by many Cape Breton and Canadian talents, including Rita MacNeil, The Rankin Family, The Barra MacNeils, Ashley MacIsaac, The White Stripes, The Barenaked Ladies, k.d. lang, Mr. Dressup, Sarah McLachlan, The Royal Winnipeg Ballet, Blue Rodeo,^{a}Liona Boyd, Harry Chapin, Melissa Etheridge, Serena Ryder, Leonard Cohen, and hundreds of others.

Recent concerts have included performances by Johnny Reid, Brett Kissel, Jeremy Dutcher, Raine Maida and Chantal Kreviazuk, as well as Johnny Reid's new musical Maggie.

=== In-house productions ===
In the early 2010s, the Savoy Theatre management took an in-depth look at the theatre's operation and realized the business model wasn't working so the theatre changed direction and now 80 per cent of its shows are self-produced. Recent in-house productions have included the musicals:

- Les Misérables (2013)
- The Little Mermaid Jr. (2014)
- Chicago (2014)
- Into the Woods (2015)
- Beauty and the Beast (2017)
- The Rocky Horror Show (2018)
- Grease (2019)
- Matilda the Musical (2019)
- Finding Nemo: The Big Blue... and Beyond! (2023)
- Elf (2023)
- Dear Rita (2022/2023/2024)
- Jersey Boys (2024)
- Mamma Mia! (2020/2024)
- Come from Away (2025)

== Theatre details ==
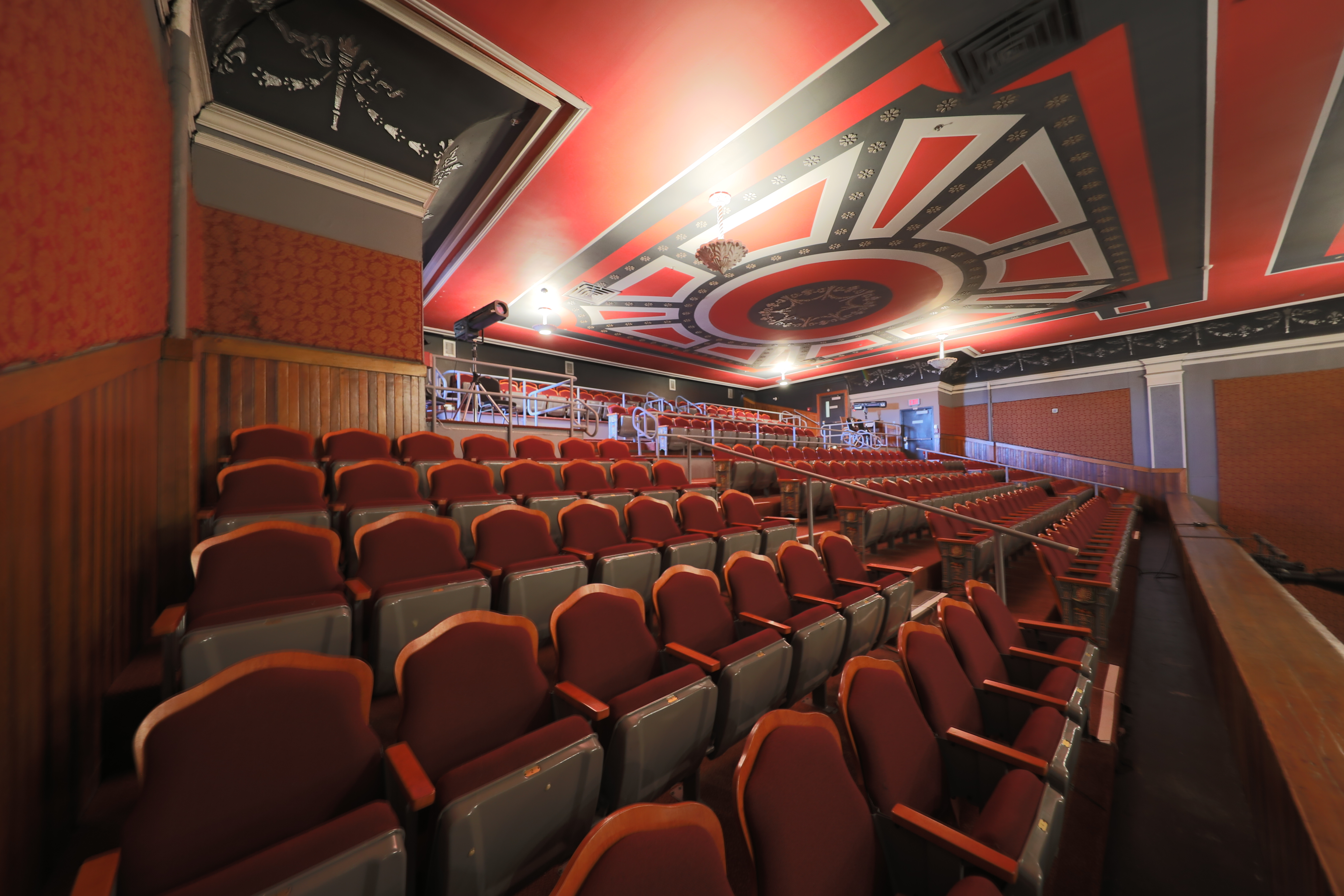
View of the balcony

- The auditorium has a capacity for 761 people with 585 orchestra seats and 206 balcony seats.
- The auditorium continues to occasionally host film. A recent example was a viewing of Queens of the Qing Dynasty.
- The foyer (lobby) has a capacity for 100 seated cabaret style.
- The Savoy has a commercial kitchen, and servery off the foyer.
- Building is accessible by wheelchair.
- The theatre may be reserved for special meetings and receptions.

== Technical details ==
The Savoy Theatre is a fully restored Victorian proscenium arch-type facility.

STAGE DIMENSIONS

- Proscenium arch
  - width: 30'
  - height: 21' - 3" (at centre line)
- Apron width: 24' - 7" (between stairs)
- Apron depth (downstage)
  - from house drape: 4' - 7"
  - to edge of orchestra pit cover: 12' - 2"
- Plaster line to
  - upstage wall: 30' - 0"
  - cyclorama: 24' - 10"
  - upstage black traveller: 24' - 0"
  - mid-stage black traveller: 10' - 6"
- Total depth (includes orchestra pit cover)
  - to upstage wall: 41' - 1"
  - to upstage overhead door: 43'
- Centre-line to
  - stage left clear: 29' - 8"
  - stage right clear: 29' - 6"
- Wing free height
  - stage left: 22'- 4"
  - stage right: 22'- 4"
  - stage right below fly gallery: 12' - 8"

== Notes ==
1.^aBlue Rodeo Or Jim Cuddy solo has performed at the Savoy at least fourteen times over the last number of years, on:

- Tuesday and Wednesday, November 4th, 5th, 2025
- Tuesday, October 24th, 2023
- Saturday, September 17, 2022
- Tuesday, February 23, 2016
- Wednesday, January 27, 2010
- Monday, February 18, 2008
- Tuesday, May 17, 2005
- Monday, February 3, 2003
- Thursday, February 14, 2002
- Tuesday and Wednesday, March 7 and 8, 2000
- Tuesday, January 13, 1998
- Thursday, May 14, 1987
