= Ayer (surname) =

Ayer is a surname. Notable people with the surname include:

- A. J. Ayer (1910–1989), British philosopher
- Caleb Ayer (1813–1883), American politician
- Claire D. Ayer (born 1948), Vermont politician
- David Ayer (born 1968), American screenwriter
- Donald B. Ayer (born 1949), United States Deputy Attorney General
- Edward E. Ayer (1841–1927), American antiquarian and benefactor
- Francis Ayer (1848–1923), American advertising businessman
- Frederick Ayer (1822–1918), American businessman
- Frederick Ayer Jr. (1915–1974), American government official
- Hal W. Ayer (died 1913), American newspaper editor and politician
- Harriet Hubbard Ayer (1849–1903), American cosmetics entrepreneur and journalist
- Hilal Tuba Tosun Ayer (born 1970), Turkish female referee
- James Cook Ayer (1818–1878), American patent medicine businessman
- Lewis Malone Ayer Jr. (1821–1895), Confederate politician
- Nat Ayer (1887–1952), British-American composer
- Richard S. Ayer (1829–1896), U.S. Representative from Virginia

== See also ==
- Edward L. Ayers, American historian and educator
- Sir Henry Ayers (1821–1897), South Australian premier

- Ayers Rock, named for him (now Uluru)

- Ayre (surname)
- Eyre (surname)
