= Ayre (surname) =

Ayre is a surname. Notable people with the surname include:

- Sir Amos Ayre (1885–1952), English shipbuilder and high-ranking Admiralty official
- Bella Ayre (born 1998), Australian rules footballer
- Billy Ayre (1952–2002), English footballer
- Bobby Ayre (1932–2018), English former footballer
- Calvin Ayre (born 1961), Canadian founder of the Bodog online gaming and entertainment brand
- Charles R. Ayre (1819–1889), Newfoundland merchant and politician
- Colin Ayre (1956–2023), English former footballer
- Garry Ayre (born 1953), Canadian former soccer player
- Jack Ayre (1894–1977), Canadian entertainer
- James S. Ayre (1881–1953), businessman and political figure in Newfoundland
- John B. Ayre (1850–1915), merchant and political figure in Newfoundland, son of Charles Ayre
- Keegan Ayre (born 1988), Canadian soccer player
- Kristian Ayre (born 1977), Canadian actor
- Lewis H.M. Ayre (1914–1985), Canadian businessman
- Richard James Ayre, English journalist
- Sanjay Ayre (born 1980), Jamaican sprinter
- William Ayre (1782 or 1783–1855), Canadian educator
