= Advertising agency =

Business creating advertisements and/or placing them in third-party media publications

An advertising agency, often referred to as a creative agency or an ad agency, is a business dedicated to creating, planning, and handling advertising and sometimes other forms of promotion and marketing for its clients. An ad agency is generally independent of the client; it may be an internal department or agency that provides an outside point of view to the effort of selling the client's products or services, or an outside firm. An agency can also handle overall marketing and branding strategies and promotions for its clients, which may include sales as well.

Typical ad agency clients include businesses and corporations, non-profit organizations and private agencies. Agencies may be hired to produce television advertisements, radio advertisements, online advertising, out-of-home advertising, mobile marketing, and AR advertising, as part of an advertising campaign.

== History ==
The first acknowledged advertising agency was William Taylor in 1786. Another early agency, started by James 'Jem' White in 1800 at Fleet Street, London, eventually evolved into White Bull Holmes, a recruitment advertising agency, that went out of business in the late 1980s. In 1812 George Reynell, an officer at the London Gazette, set up another of the early advertising agencies, also in London. This remained a family business until 1993, as 'Reynell & Son,' and is now part of the TMP Worldwide agency (UK and Ireland) under the brand TMP Reynell. Another early agency that traded until recently, was founded by Charles Barker, and the firm he established traded as 'Barkers' until 2009 when it went into Administration.

Volney B. Palmer opened the first American advertising agency, in Philadelphia in 1850. This agency placed ads produced by its clients in various newspapers.

In 1856, Mathew Brady created the first modern advertisement when he placed an ad in the New York Herald paper offering to produce "photographs, ambrotypes, and daguerreotypes." His ads were the first whose typeface and fonts were distinct from the text of the publication and from that of other advertisements. At that time all newspaper ads were set in agate and only agate. His use of larger distinctive fonts caused a sensation. Later that same year Robert E. Bonner ran the first full-page ad in a newspaper.

In 1864, William James Carlton began selling advertising space in religious magazines. In 1869, Francis Ayer, at the age of 20, created the first full-service advertising agency in Philadelphia, called N.W. Ayer & Son. It was the oldest advertising agency in America and dissolved in 2002. James Walter Thompson joined Carlton's firm in 1868. Thompson rapidly became their best salesman, purchasing the company in 1877 and renaming it the James Walter Thompson Company. Realizing that he could sell more space if the company provided the service of developing content for advertisers, Thompson hired writers and artists to form the first known Creative Department in an advertising agency. He is credited as the "father of modern magazine advertising" in the US. Advertising Age commemorated the first 100 years of the agency in 1964, noting that its "history and expansion overseas seems peculiarly to match the whole history of modern advertising."

== Global advertising agency ==
Globalization of advertising originates in earlier days of the twentieth century. American advertising agencies began as the process of opening overseas offices before the two World Wars and accelerated their globalization throughout the latter part of the twentieth century.

McCann, an agency established in New York City in 1902, opened its first European offices by 1927. It was followed up with offices opening in South America in 1935 and in Australia in 1959.

Companies such as J. Walter Thompson adopted a strategy to expand in order to provide advertising services wherever clients operated.

In the 1960s and 1970s, English agencies began to realize the overseas opportunities associated with globalization. Expanding overseas gives potential to wider markets.

In the early 21st century, management consulting firms such as PwC Digital and Deloitte Digital began competing with ad agencies by emphasizing data analytics. As of 2017, Accenture Interactive was the world's sixth-largest ad agency, behind WPP, Omnicom, Publicis, Interpublic, and Dentsu. In 2019, it purchased David Droga's Droga5 agency, the first major consultant acquisition of an ad agency.

== Client relationships ==
Studies show that successful advertising agencies tend to have a shared sense of purpose with their clients through collaboration. This includes a common set of client objectives where agencies feel a shared sense of ownership of the strategic process. Successful advertisements start with clients building a good relationship with the agencies and work together to figure out what their objectives are. Clients must trust the agencies to do their jobs correctly and accordingly with the resources they have provided. Breakdowns in relationships were more likely to occur when agencies felt undermined, subjugated, or even feel they do not have equal status. Traditionally advertising agencies tend to be in a position to take the lead on projects but results are best when there is a more collaborative relationship.

Stronger collaboration happens in situations where a personal chemistry has been established between both parties. Finding out similar likes and dislikes, points of view, and even hobbies and passions. Personal chemistry builds with the length of the client relationship, frequency of meetings, and how far mutual respect goes between parties. This was one trait that advertising agencies were perceived to not always have. It was suggested that on occasions media planners and researchers were more closely involved in the project because of their personal relationships with their clients. Successful strategic planning is best when both parties are involved due to the bond between sides by understanding each other's views and mindset.

Involved advertising account planners are seen to contribute towards successful agency-client collaboration. Planners of advertising agencies tend to be capable of creating a very powerful, trusting relationship with their clients because they were seen as intellectual prowess, seniority, and have empathy in the creative process.

== Agencies ==
All advertising agencies are called that because they are acting as agents for their principals which were the media. They were then, and are now, paid by the media to sell advertising space to clients. Originally, in the 18th century, and the first half of the 19th, advertising agencies made all of their income from commissions paid by the media for selling space to the client.

Although it is still the case that the majority of their income comes from the media, in the middle of the 19th century, agencies began to offer additional services which they sold directly to the client. Such services can include writing the text of the advertisement.

== Creativity ==
The use of creativity by agencies is "unexpected" because so much advertising today is expected. This will capture the attention of audiences, therefore the message is more likely to get through. There have been many advertisements that have surprised audiences because it was not normal for them to see that in an advertisement of that nature. The best use of creativity is when the agencies make consumers think about the product or brand. The type of creativity is distinctive communication which is breaking through the clutter.

== Largest advertising agencies ==
The "big six" largest agencies, with their estimated worldwide revenues in quarter three of 2021 were:

1. WPP, London $4.45 billion
2. Omnicom Group, New York City $3.43 billion
3. Publicis, Paris $2.96 billion
4. IPG, New York City $2.26 billion
5. Dentsu, Tokyo $2.25 billion
6. Havas, Paris $668 million
