= Iyar (disambiguation) =

Iyar may refer to:

- Iyar, the eighth month of the civil year (which starts on 1 Tishrei) and the second month of the Jewish religious year (which starts on 1 Nisan) on the Hebrew calendar.
- Iyare Igiehon (born 1974), British DJ, Radio personality, and filmmaker
- Subrah Iyar (born 1957), Indian entrepreneur

== See also ==
- Ayar (disambiguation)
- Ayyar (disambiguation)
- Iyengar (disambiguation)
- Ayer (disambiguation)
- Iyer (also spelled Iyar, Ayar, Ayyar or Ayer), a Hindu Brahmin community from India
- Mimana Iyar Chronicle, role-playing video game
