= N. W. Ayer & Son =

Defunct Philadelphia-based advertising agency

Coordinates: 39.94726°N 75.15354°W

- Industry: Advertising
- Founded: Philadelphia, Pennsylvania, US (1869)
- Founder: Francis Wayland Ayer
- Defunct: 2002
- Fate: Dissolved
- Successor: MacManus Group, Bcom3, Kaplan Thaler Group, Publicis Groupe
- Headquarters: Philadelphia, Pennsylvania, US

N. W. Ayer & Son was a Philadelphia advertising agency founded in 1869. It called itself the oldest advertising agency in the United States. Named by Francis Ayer after his father N. W. Ayer, it ventured into advertising in 1884. It created a number of memorable slogans for firms such as De Beers, AT&T and the U.S. Army. The company started to decline in the 1960s and, after a series of mergers, closed in 2002 with its assets sold to the Publicis Groupe.

== Early history ==
N. W. Ayer & Son was founded in Philadelphia in 1869 by 21-year-old Francis Ayer, who named the agency after his father, N. W. Ayer. N. W. Ayer & Son started its business by representing religious weekly newspapers. The initial business was brokering advertising space rather than ad design. By 1877, N. W. Ayer & Son had become successful enough to obtain what remained of another agency, the Volney Palmer Agency. They also acquired George P. Rowell's American Newspaper Directory, which became N. W. Ayer & Son's American Newspaper Annual and later Ayer's Newspaper Annual and Directory.

In 1884, Ayer expanded into the advertising counseling business. Ayer took on helping compose the advertisements. Ayer styled itself the oldest advertising firm in the U.S. In 1892, artists and writers began working in groups known as creative teams. Eventually Ayer became responsible for some of the most recognized slogans in advertising history. Gerold M. Lauck was president of Ayer in the 1930s.

== Notable slogans ==
- When it rains it pours, advertising salt for Morton Salt, coined in 1912.
- I'd walk a mile for a Camel, advertising Camel cigarettes for R.J. Reynolds Tobacco, coined in 1921 by William Martin Armistead. Sometimes formed into a jingle, I'd walk a mile for a mild, mild Camel.
- A diamond is forever, advertising diamonds for De Beers, coined in 1947 by Mary Frances Gerety.
- Reach out and touch someone, advertising long-distance telephone service for AT&T Corp., coined in 1979 by Anthony (Tony) P. Galli and Stanley Lomas. Music composed by David Lucas.
- We may be the only phone company in town, but we try not to act like it, advertising phone services for AT&T, coined by Tony Galli.
- Today's army wants to join you, advertising military service for the U.S. Army.
- Be all you can be, advertising military service for the U.S. Army, coined in 1981 by E. N. J. Carter.

== De Beers ==
N. W. Ayer & Son created the slogan, A diamond is forever.

Harry Oppenheimer of De Beers and Ayer president Gerold M. Lauck discussed a marketing campaign in 1938 that would change the falling price of diamonds at the time. The idea of engagement rings decorated with diamonds wasn't very popular in Europe, but interest in diamonds was high in the U.S. Because of this, Oppenheimer decided to promote the idea in the U.S. and told Lauck that, if Ayer's plan was successful, De Beers would have Ayer become the exclusive agency for its American interests. Ayer was motivated to propose that its campaign should move the American spending demographic towards larger and more expensive diamonds.

To successfully achieve its goal, Ayer suggested a reinforcement of the relationship of diamonds with love and romance. This proved successful, as both men and women were caught in the relationship of diamonds being a gift of love. The slogan created for De Beers remained memorable for many years.

== AT&T ==
In 1906, Ayer was commissioned by the Mutual Life Insurance Company of New York to create an advertising campaign for AT&T Corp. Ayer's successful campaign began with the AT&T ad Twenty million voices, appearing in June, with four more appearing in the following months. Due to the campaign's success, AT&T made Ayer its main advertising agency. This relationship continued until the 1970s and became one of the oldest advertising relationships in America.

Ayer created the slogan Reach out and touch someone, one of AT&T's most successful ads, coined in 1979 by Tony Galli and Stanley Lomas; music was composed by David Lucas. Galli's original phrasing was: To communicate is the beginning of understanding. Reach out and touch someone.

== Decline ==
In the late 1960s, Ayer faced challenges from industry changes as smaller agencies began creating ads appealing to targeted groups of consumers. This method focused agency attention on single demographics and could be performed faster by smaller agencies rather than traditional larger agencies. Ayer's standing dropped to tenth place among major agencies in one report. In 1982, it called itself the 14th largest advertising agency in the U.S.

In 1986, Ayer received positive feedback for its U.S. Army recruiting slogan, Be all that you can be. This campaign benefited the army's recruitment goals greatly, and also faced negative responses toward the Vietnam War and low enlistment. In a well-published scandal, charges of bid rigging were filed against the Ayer employee responsible for the Army collaboration, and Ayer was consequently suspended from making bids with any branches of government.

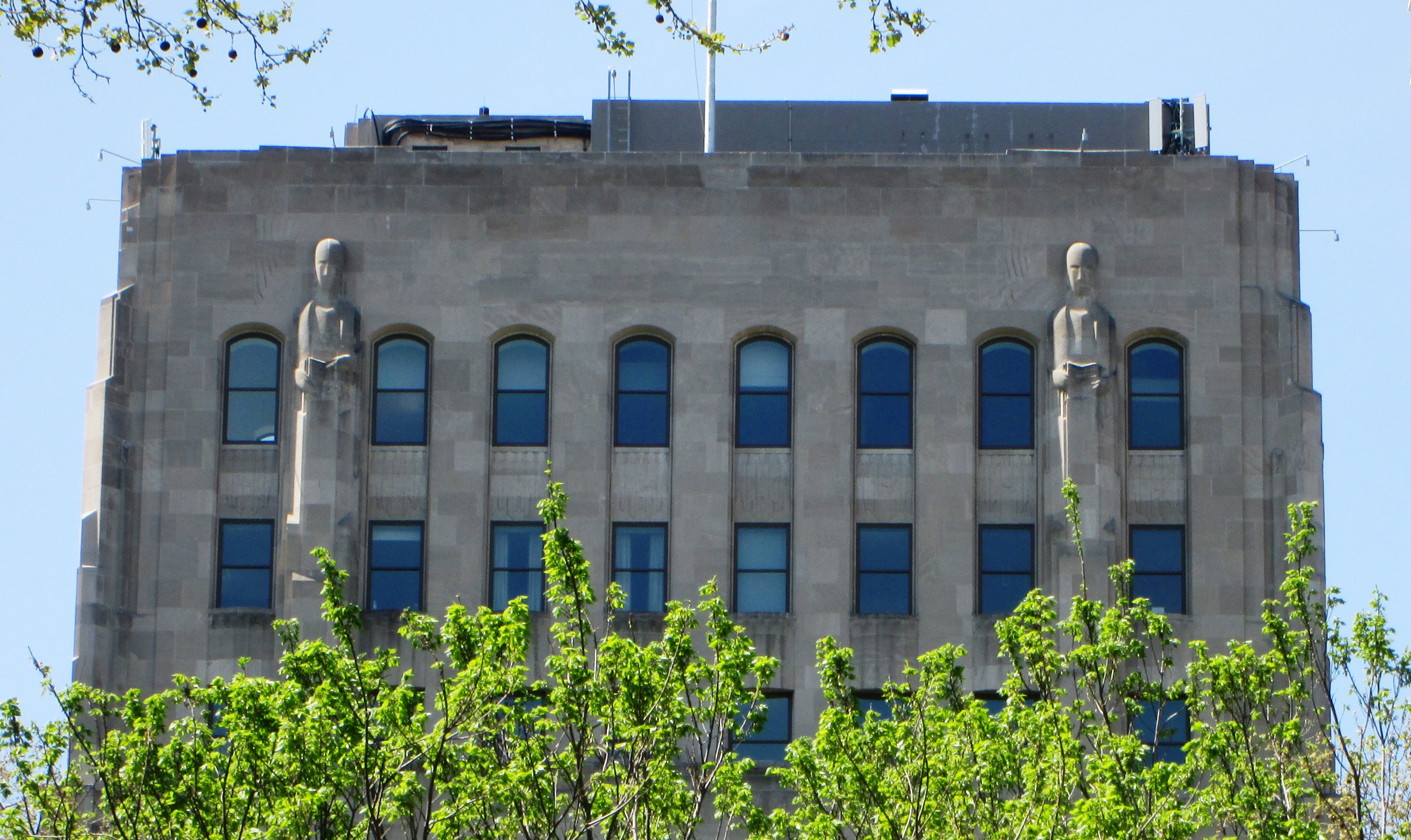
The top of the N. W. Ayer & Son headquarters building at 210 West Washington Square in Philadelphia, built in 1928 and designed by Ralph Bencker in the Art Deco style

The Army account loss struck Ayer hard. Ayer strengthened its business by obtaining an account with the Burger King Corporation but lost the account after 18 months. Ayer also desperately tried to keep the AT&T Corp. account, but AT&T parted ways around the same time despite its long history with Ayer.

== Merger ==
Due to the Army scandal, Ayer began to struggle, and its importance gradually faded. In 1996 Ayer became part of MacManus Group after merging with D'Arcy Masius Benton & Bowles. Three years later, Ayer CEO Mary Lou Quinlan stepped down to form a new unit within MacManus and was replaced by Mary Beth Casey. Under MacManus, Ayer was merged with Leo Group and Dentsu to form Bcom3. In 2002, Bcom3 retired the Ayer name and merged it into the thriving Kaplan Thaler Group, where Ayer's stalwart client, Continental Airlines, took flight again.

Bcom3 Chairman and CEO Roger Haupt said, "Retiring the venerable N. W. Ayer name wasn't easy .... It is more about the Kaplan name .... We're in a situation where we have an excellent agency in Kaplan Thaler and at the end of the day that's the right thing to do." "Ayer" remained one of the most recognized names in advertising; other agencies approximately as old as Ayer are overshadowed by Ayer's legacy.

Ayer's assets were bought by the Publicis Groupe in Paris, which closed down the Ayer offices in 2002. In 2005, the N. W. Ayer Philadelphia building was purchased and has been made into The Ayer, a luxury condominium.
