= William Martin Armistead House =

Historic house in Florida, United States

- U.S. National Register of Historic Places
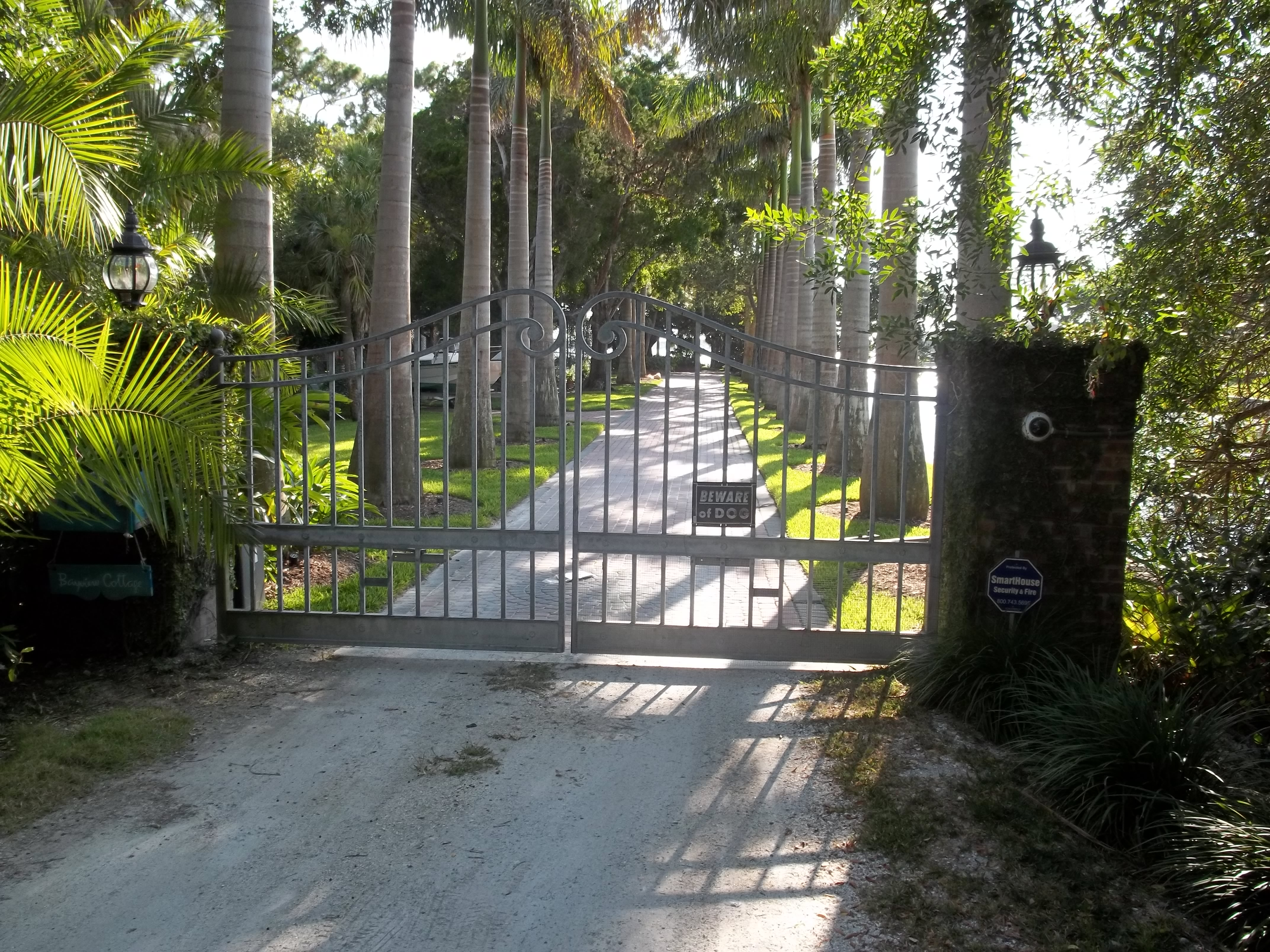
- Entry gate

- Location within Florida Location within the United States
- Location: 1510 Hyde Park St, Sarasota, Florida, USA
- Coordinates: 27°18′55″N 82°32′22″W
- Built: 1941
- Architectural style: Colonial Revival
- NRHP reference No.: 09000165
- Added to NRHP: March 30, 2009

The William Martin Armistead House is a historic building at 1510 Hyde Park Street in Sarasota, Florida, United States. It was owned by William Martin Armistead who was prominent in the advertising industry. On March 30, 2009, it was added to the U.S. National Register of Historic Places.

== See also ==
- National Register of Historic Places listings in Sarasota County, Florida
