= Ayyar =

Ayyar may refer to:

- Ayyar, a lunar month in the Arabic calendar, corresponding to Iyar in the Hebrew calendar and to May in the Gregorian calendar
- Ayyār, a person associated with a class of warriors in Iraq and Iran from the 9th to the 12th centuries
- Ayyarids or Annazids, a Kurdish Sunni Muslim dynasty that ruled a territory on the present-day Iran-Iraq frontier

== People ==
- A. S. P. Ayyar (1899–1963), Indian writer
- Ganesh Ayyar (born 1961), Indian executive
- Konerirajapuram Vaidyanatha Ayyar (1878-1921), Carnatic Indian vocalist from Tamil Nadu

== See also ==
- Ayar (disambiguation)
- Iyar (disambiguation)
- Iyengar (disambiguation)
- Ayer (disambiguation)
- Ajjar of Bulgaria, or Ayyar of Bulgaria, a succession name for the Throne of Bulgaria
- Konar (caste), also known as Ayar and Idaiyar, an ethnic group from the Indian state of Tamil Nadu
- Iyer (also spelt as Ayyar, Aiyar, Ayer or Aiyer), a caste of Indian Hindu Brahmin communities of Tamil origin
- Iyer the Great, also known as Ayyar the Great, 1990 Indian Malayalam-language psychological thriller film
- Ayyare, a 2012 Indian Telugu-language comedy film
- Aiyyaa, a 2012 Indian film by Sachin Kundalkar
