= Ayar =

Ayar may refer to:

- Ayyar, a lunar month in the Arabic calendar, corresponding to Iyar in the Hebrew calendar, and May in the Gregorian calendar

== Persons ==
- Ayar Cachi, Incan mythological figure
- Mulu Ayar Bera, Indian politician
- Kaan Ayar (born 1995), Turkish swimmer

== Places ==
- Ayar River or Ahar River, a tributary of the Berach River

== Other uses ==
- Ayar (Mandaean month)

== See also ==
- Ayyar (disambiguation)
- Iyar (disambiguation)
- Iyengar (disambiguation)
- Ayer (disambiguation)
- Iyer (also spelled Iyar, Ayar, Ayyar or Ayer), a Hindu Brahmin community from India
- Konar (caste), also known as Ayar and Idaiyar, an ethnic group from the Indian state of Tamil Nadu
