= Iyengar (disambiguation) =

Iyengar may be:

- Iyengar, an Indian ethnoreligious community
- Aabria Iyengar, American tabletop role-playing game actress
- B. K. S. Iyengar, Indian yoga teacher, founder of Iyengar Yoga school of modern yoga
- Geeta Iyengar, Indian yoga teacher, daughter of B. K. S. Iyengar
- Shanto Iyengar, Indian-American political scientist
- Sundaraja Sitharama Iyengar, Indian computer scientist

== See also ==
- List of Iyengars
- Iyer, related community in India
- Ayyar (disambiguation)
- Ayar (disambiguation)
- Iyar (disambiguation)
- Ayer (disambiguation)
