= Stanley Lomas =

Stanley A. Lomas (1913–2003) was a pioneer in television from 1948. He produced early televised college football games in 1948–49. Stan also produced numerous television commercials featuring celebrities, including many of the New York Yankees of the 1950s, John Wayne, William Holden and others. His commercial clients included Winston and Camel cigarettes and various New York area beer brands. A few of his commercials featured the infamous "4 out of five doctors recommend Winston cigarettes" tag.

Stanley A. Lomas & Associates on Madison Avenue performed marketing research for companies such as Occidental, where he met and befriended Armand Hammer, Wishbone (salad dressings) and AT&T, for whom Stan coined the memorable phrase "Reach out and touch someone far away." The company was looking for (and found in Stan's phrase) a way to promote their long-distance services. The melody was written by David Lucas.

Stan was active in politics in and around Pound Ridge, New York, where he lived for more than 30 years. Stanley retired in 1982 and took up painting, studying at the Silvermine School for the Arts in New Canaan, Connecticut and with Clifford Jackson (1924–1985) in Amawalk, New York. In 1991 Stan and his wife Mary Jane moved to middle Tennessee, where Stan eventually became president of the Hendersonville Arts Council. He also promoted the Nashville Zoo through gifts and auction items, and lectured on Revolution-era American history.

The Smithsonian Museum in Washington DC houses a compilation of Stan's advertising, including many of the early commercials mentioned above.

Stan's work in advertising and marketing research were greatly facilitated by his experience in the US Army during World War II. Originally cavalry, he later commanded a battery of 155 mm guns on Maui before moving into intelligence services, where he helped formulate propaganda tools and methods against the Japanese.
