= Mary Frances Gerety =

American copywriter

- Born: 1916; Philadelphia, Pennsylvania
- Died: April 11, 1999 (aged 82–83); Derby, Pennsylvania
- Occupation: Copywriter
- Writing career
- Notable work: "A Diamond is Forever"

Mary Frances Gerety (1916-1999) was the copywriter responsible for the "A Diamond is Forever" slogan created for De Beers Consolidated Mines, Ltd. This famous slogan is still used today in advertising pertaining to diamonds.

== Personal life ==
Mary Frances Gerety, who primarily went by "Frances," was born in 1916 in Philadelphia, Pennsylvania. She graduated from Charles Morris Price School of Advertising and Journalism and was later a student at the University of Pennsylvania. Gerety lived alone in Wayne, Pennsylvania for most of her life and died in Derby, Pennsylvania at the age of 83 on April 11, 1999 .

== N. W. Ayers ==
Frances Gerety began working at the N. W. Ayer & Son advertising agency as a copywriter in 1943 and continued until 1970. Gerety helped to create advertisements that were published in Vogue, Life, Collier's, The Saturday Evening Post, Look, and Harper's Bazaar.

== "A Diamond is Forever" ==
Due to the decline of diamond sales after the Great Depression, the diamond company De Beers was desperate to increase marketing strategies. De Beers Consolidated Mines, Ltd. hired N.W. Ayers & Son to advertise their diamonds in 1938. Since women in advertising were generally assigned to cases that only pertained to women, Gerety was the prime copywriter for the job. In 1948, Gerety was assigned to create a slogan that encapsulates the security and eternal romance that comes with owning a diamond.

Gerety scribbled the slogan “A Diamond is Forever” on a piece of paper late one night. The next morning, she presented the slogan to her associates at N. W. Ayers. Her associates were initially hesitant to use the slogan due to its strange grammar, but it eventually became one of the most recognized advertising slogans of its time. The slogan has been used in every De Beers ad since 1948 and continues to be used today.

In 1989, Gerety was honored at the 50th Anniversary for N.W. Ayers and De Beer’s anniversary in London for her work with De Beers. Advertising Age named “A Diamond is Forever” the slogan of the 20th century in 1999.

== Gerety Awards ==
In 2019, advertising professionals Lucía Ongay and Joe Brooks founded the Gerety Awards to recognize creative achievement in advertising. The competition and festival is named after Gerety for coining the advertising slogan "A Diamond Is Forever."

Juries made up exclusively of women evaluate advertising campaigns, including campaigns that do not specifically target women. The organizers created this structure to incorporate women's perspectives into the evaluation creative advertising. In the first competition, judging took place in ten cities, including New York, London, Mumbai and São Paulo, and an international grand jury selected the winners.

== Fiction ==
Gerety was portrayed in a fictional novel The Engagements by J. Courtney Sullivan.
