= William Armistead (1762–1842) =

American planter (1762–1844)

- Born: 1762; Elizabeth City County, Virginia
- Died: 1844 (aged 81–82); Clarke County, Alabama
- Children: Lucy

William Armistead (1762–1799) was a Revolutionary War drummer boy from Elizabeth City County, Virginia, who became a planter (and slaveowner) in North Carolina and later in Alabama. This William Armistead was born in 1762 to one of the First Families of Virginia, and considerable genealogical research has been performed to determine his parentage, due to his father's impecunious state and records lost over time.

In 1838 he applied for a pension based on his Revolutionary War service, and stated his parents died as a boy. Underage, he enlisted as a musician (drummer boy) in Williamsburg, Virginia in 1777, and served with Virginia troops in Muhlenberg's Brigade during the winter at Valley Forge, Pennsylvania, then followed the British as they retreated through New Jersey, including at the Battle of Monmouth. His unit was then attached to troops commanded by General Anthony Wayne and Major Feury, which marched to the Hudson River in New York and stormed Stony Point in 1779. He remained in the Philadelphia area for some time, before being marched back to Virginia and discharged in Williamsburg at the end of his 3-year enlistment. The Second Virginia Infantry was commanded by Col. Gregory L. Smith and then Col. William Brent, until 1780. The captains of his company were initially Spiller and Dent, and later Henry Garnet, John Dudley and John Hudson. Armistead received land warrants as well as backpay at the end of the conflict.

Four men of the same name are named in Elizabeth City County records between 1755 and 1770. The oldest was named a constable in 1757 and 1761 and a justice of the peace the following year, and tax records named him in "Gent" or "Sr." but all his children are accounted for, including his son William (a/k/a "Jr"). This William may have been named for his grandfather, whom one genealogist believes was Col. William Armistead of North Carolina. His son James studied on and off at the College of William and Mary, and became a mariner, which may mesh with the family tradition of him being a wastrel. James' son William was on the Elizabeth City County Committee of Safety. Another man "Mill" William Armistead had an Elizabeth City County William Armstrong as a great-great-great-grandfather, and moved from North Carolina to Elizabeth City County after the Revolution and married Elizabeth, the daughter of Booth Armistead. His grandfather John Armistead was a planter in Northampton County (now Warren County, North Carolina) on the Roanoke River as well as Halifax County, Virginia on the other side and returned to the Elizabeth City area during the conflict to sell many provisions to the Continental Army. Of his many children, his sons Tignal and Albridgeton Armistead were officers, while his son Robert remained in North Carolina tending the farm. James Armistead married Ann by 1758 and died by 1771. That this William Armstrong named his Alabama plantation "Gosport" and such was a major shipyard in the Hampton Roads area of Virginia further indicates he may have been James' son and no contradictory evidence has been found, unlike with other men of the same name. This William Armistead married twice, and had children by both wives.

The 1790 first federal census shows the future William Armistead of Clarke County, Alabama lived in Warren County, North Carolina. His family included two boys under 10 years old and two girls.
