= Iyare Igiehon =

British DJ and radio presenter

Iyare Nossa Gamel Abdel Igiehon (/iːˈjɑːreɪ ˈiːɡiːhoʊn/ ee-YAR-ay EE-gee-hohn, more commonly known as Iyare; born 3 March 1974) is a British DJ, Radio personality, and filmmaker.

== Early life ==
Igiehon grew up in London and studied Pop Music Studies at the University of Leeds and graduated with 1st-class honours. Returning to London he worked as a recording engineer for Studio 33 in West London. In 2000 he joined Darkerthanblue as online music editor.

== Radio career ==
Igiehon was also part of the DJ duo Jason and Iyare. In 2001 they broadcast a one-hour show called The Presence on Monday nights on the Student Broadcast Network, playing RnB for nine months until the launch of BBC 1Xtra. They then went on to present the Breakfast show on BBC 1Xtra when the station launched in August 2002 until October 2007.

In January 2008 he joined BBC 6 Music, presenting the 6 Mix on Saturday nights, then from October 2008 he presented the Weekend Breakfast show which is produced by Somethin' Else until the end of November 2009, when he left the network.

In 2006, they set up a separate radio production company called On It Industries, which produced original radio productions such as the Radio 1Xtra weekday M1X show, as well as various documentaries until May 2009.

He has also (as of 4 May 2013) made 25 appearances on the Radio 5 Live show Fighting Talk.
