= William Ayre =

Canadian teacher

William Ayre (1782 or 1783 – April 14, 1855) was a teacher in Nova Scotia, Canada.

Born in Ireland, William Ayre taught in the Antigonish area until 1835, when he moved to Port Hood, Cape Breton Island. Some short time later, Ayre's teaching license was withdrawn due to drunkenness. Ayre continued to teach in Cape Breton without a license or financial support from the government. He petitioned repeatedly to have his license reinstated.

In 1837 Ayre built a "Seminary" in Mabou. The school included a library, a school room and accommodation for 14 boarding students. However Ayre ran out of money and the school was known locally as "Ayre's Folly".

In 1841 Ayre's license was finally reinstated.

While teaching at North East Margaree in 1844, Ayre advertised in the Novascotian that his schoolroom held a library of textbooks, scientific and nautical works and stationery, which he sold to pupils on accommodating terms, and that adult students could also use the library and two weekly newspapers. Writing in 1851 from a school at Rossville in Margaree, he described constructing a sundial for his pupils and purchasing a globe recommended by the superintendent of education, John William Dawson, and complained of local indifference towards reading and education.

He continued to teach until 1854 when he retired, moving to Halifax. He died the next year.
