= Francis Ayer =

American businessman

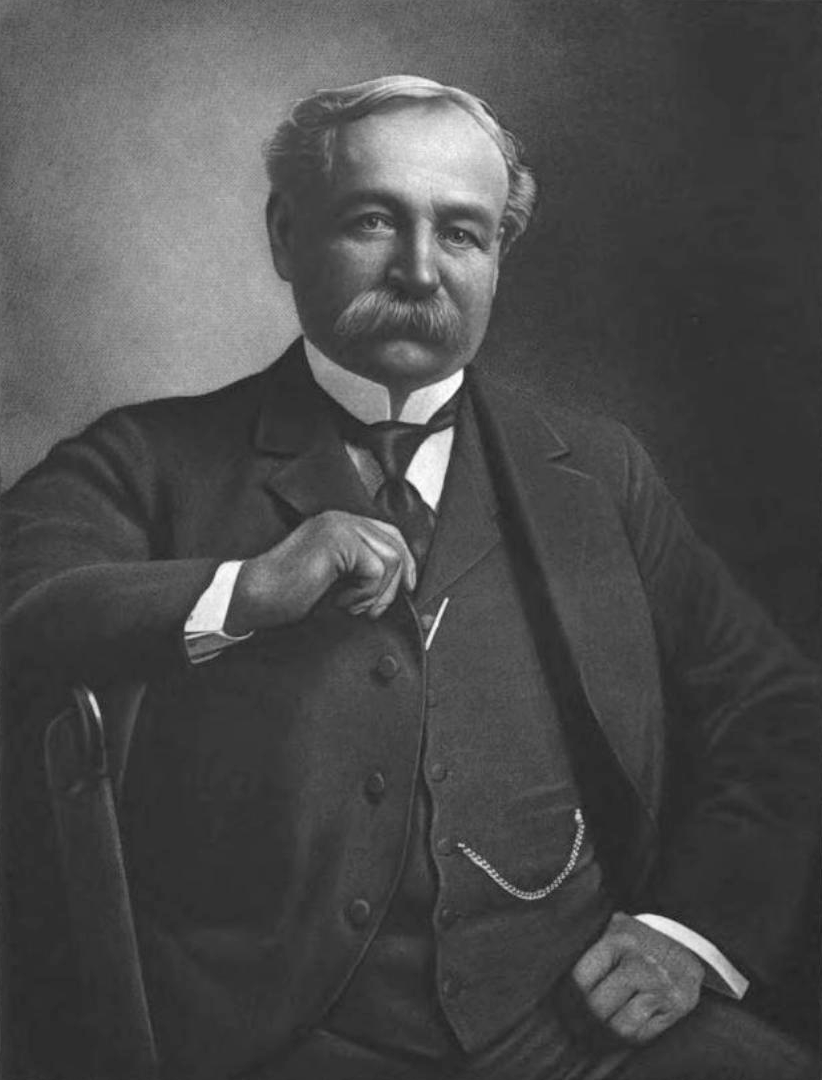
- Born: Francis Wayland Ayer; February 4, 1848; Lee, Massachusetts, U.S.
- Died: March 5, 1923 (aged 75); Meredith, New York, U.S.
- Burial place: Laurel Hill Cemetery
- Occupation: Advertising businessman
- Spouses: Rhandera Gilman (m. 1875; died 1914) Martha K. Lawson (m. 1919)

Signature
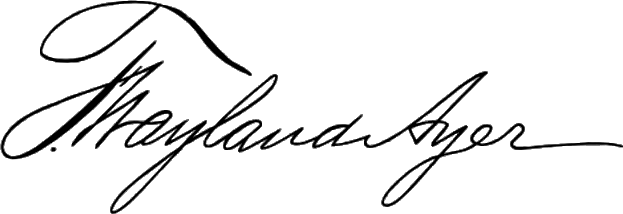

Francis Wayland Ayer (February 4, 1848 – March 5, 1923) was an American advertising businessman based in Philadelphia. His agency, N. W. Ayer & Son, was recognized as a pioneer in the field of American newspaper advertising.

== Early life and education ==
Francis Wayland Ayer was born in Lee, Massachusetts on February 4, 1848, to Nathaniel Wheeler Ayer and Joanna B. Wheeler. though he was raised in western New York. His father was a graduate of Brown University and licensed attorney who served as the principal at preparatory schools throughout New York state. His mother died when he was three years old, and his father remarried Harriett Amanda Post.

Ayer was homeschooled under his father's supervision and became a teacher at the age of fourteen. He continued teaching until 1867, when he enrolled at the University of Rochester. His father relocated to Philadelphia in the same year.

== Career ==
In 1869, Ayer joined his father in Philadelphia to found the advertising firm N. W. Ayer & Son. He became head of the firm upon his father's death in 1873 and maintained the name in his memory. Over the course of his life, Ayer grew the business into a leading position in the newspaper advertising agency. In addition to its direct work in advertising, Ayer & Son became known for its annual publication of a complete directory of United States newspapers, which it had acquired from George P. Rowell. Besides himself, he began with only a bookkeeper and US$25. Early clients were primarily religious weekly newspapers. By 1877, the firm had become successful enough to acquire a rival firm, the Volney Palmer Agency.

In 1884, Ayer expanded into the advertising consulting industry, advising clients directly on the content of their advertisements and hiring writers and artists to compose them. Over many years, including after his death, Ayer & Son became a leading advertising agency, developing slogans for clients including Morton Salt, R. J. Reynolds Tobacco, De Beers, AT&T, and the United States Army.

In addition to his advertising work, Ayer was an active investor in street rail, serving as director and later president of the Camden and Suburban Railway Company.

== Personal life and death ==
On May 5, 1875, he married his first wife, Rhandera Gilman. They had two daughters together. She died in 1914. On April 21, 1919, he remarried to Martha K. Lawson.

Ayer was a leading figure in the Baptist community of New Jersey, serving as president of the Camden YMCA and a member of its international committee. He was a sunday school superintendent for nearly fifty years near the time of his death.

Ayer died on March 5, 1923 from pneumonia at his country home at Meredith, New York. He was buried at Laurel Hill Cemetery in Philadelphia.
