= William Martin Armistead =

American publicist

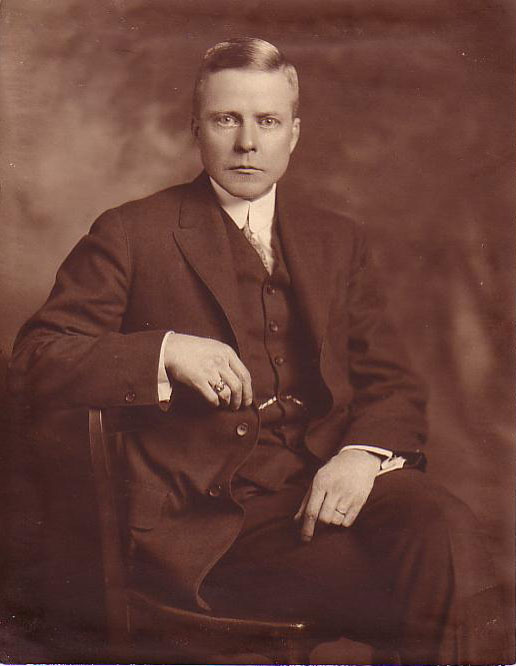
- William M. Armistead
- Born: May 8, 1873
- Died: November 5, 1955 (aged 82)
- Occupation: Publicist

William Martin Armistead (May 8, 1873 – November 5, 1955) was a publicist for N. W. Ayer & Son, the oldest advertising agency in the United States. He is credited with inventing the modern style of advertising, proposing small frequent announcements, shying away from the normal practice of publishing weekly or annual announcements in newspapers. He is buried in Mount Olivet Cemetery in Nashville.

== Early life ==
Born on May 8, 1873, in Davidson Co., TN and died in Wayne, PA on November 5, 1955. At age 12 he became a messenger for the Banner of Nashville, and at age 17 he was promoted to office boy. He later moved to Atlanta, where he started his own advertising agency. In 1914, he married Eleanora Smith, a descendant of James Robertson (explorer).

== Advertising ==
In 1909, William Armistead was approached by the firm N.W. Ayer & Son, and offered a position in the Philadelphia headquarters.

In 1913, he mapped an advertising program for R. J. Reynolds.

In 1918, William Armistead was elected a member of the firm [N. W. Ayer & Son]. During this time, he was in charge of the whole South, seeking companies that could benefit from advertising. Soon after he was in charge of advertising for Prince Albert Tobacco, Camel Cigarettes, the converting of Canon Mills to national advertising. He also helped launch the Ford Motor Company on it first national advertising, when the Model A Ford was introduced in 1927.

William Martin Armistead was credited with running the first advertising campaign for Camel cigarettes." As part of his campaign, he coined the slogan: "I'd walk a mile for a Camel," which was the basis for the famous campaign and the launching of the Camel cigarette brand.

On April 12, 1919, he described a new campaign "to advertise advertising" in which he pointed out to the readers of daily newspapers the benefit from reading carefully each advertisement, saying: "Very few publishers, until recently, gave serious consideration to making their publications better advertising mediums to consistently educate readers to read advertisement. Advertising advertising is a most interesting subject when one takes in consideration what advertising has accomplished for the public in an economic way. Among other things it has played its part in making this country a united nation. The same tobacco, the same cigarettes, the same pipes, same automobile tires, the same shoes, same clothing, same hats, same toilet articles and thousand of commodities are sold under same brands in every section of this country in cities, towns and at crossroads. Advertising has taken the chance out of buying. It conserves time in shopping, It at once directs the consumer to the best articles. Advertising has accomplished this and more."

In 1929, when N. W. Ayer & Son became a corporation, he became vice-president. Due to personal illness, he retired in 1930, selling his shares of the original trust. In 1936, he returned to the firm.

== Works ==
One of his writings, on preempting a competitor, is kept in the Reynolds archives: "Mr. Armistead's Memo" 22-24, Series 19, Box 7, File 1, AC.
