= Camel (cigarette) =

Cigarette brand

- Product type: Cigarette
- Current owner: Japan Tobacco; R. J. Reynolds
- Produced by: Japan Tobacco International (outside U.S.); R. J. Reynolds (U.S.)
- Country: United States
- Introduced: 1913; 113 years ago
- Tagline: List: "The Camels are coming"; "I'd walk a mile for a Camel!"; "For digestion's sake – smoke Camels"; "Hump Day"; "More doctors smoke Camels than any other cigarette"; "Have a REAL cigarette - Camel"
- Website: camel.com

Camel is an American brand of cigarettes, currently owned and manufactured by the R. J. Reynolds Tobacco Company in the United States and by Japan Tobacco outside the U.S. Most recently Camel cigarettes contain a blend of Turkish tobacco and Virginia tobacco. Winston-Salem, North Carolina, the city where R. J. Reynolds was founded, is nicknamed "Camel City" because of the brand's popularity.

== History ==
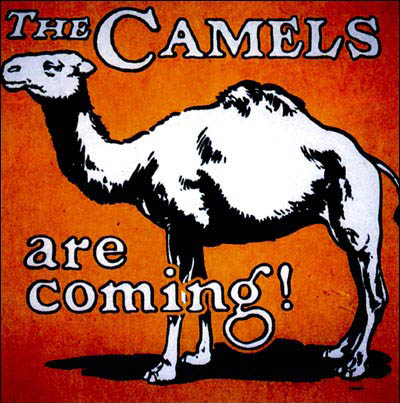
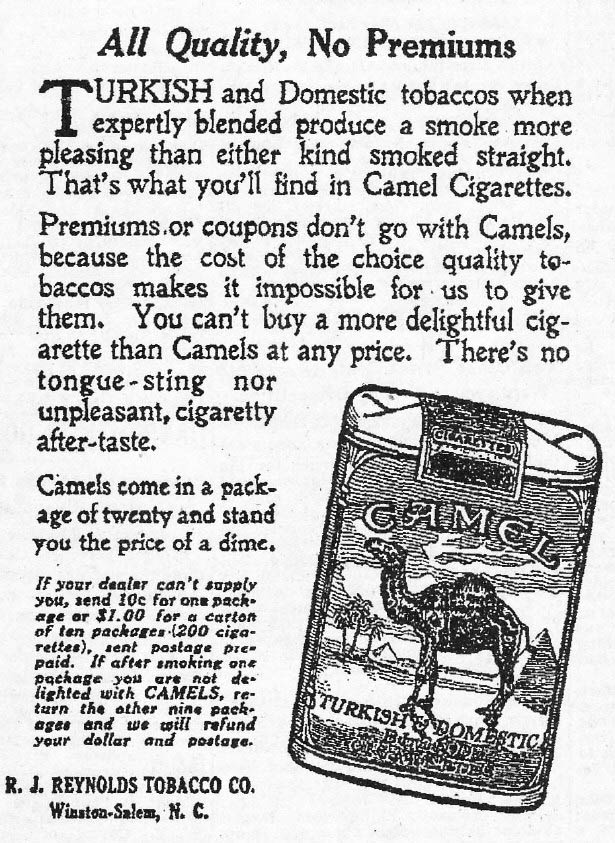
Two early Camel advertisements, (left): "The camels are coming!", a piece of a series prior to the brand release in 1913. (right): 1915 ad from The New York Times, offering a money-back guarantee with the injunction, "Premiums or coupons don't go with Camels, because the cost of the choice quality tobaccos makes it impossible for us to give them"

In 1913, Richard Joshua "R. J." Reynolds, founder of the company that still bears his name, innovated the packaged cigarette. Prior cigarette smokers had rolled their own, which tended to obscure the potential for a national market for a pre-packaged product. Reynolds worked to develop a more appealing flavor, creating the Camel cigarette, which he so named because it used Turkish tobacco in imitation of then-fashionable Egyptian cigarettes. Reynolds priced them below competitors, and within a year, he had sold 425 million packs.

Camel cigarettes were originally blended to have a milder taste than established brands. They were advance-promoted by a careful advertising campaign that included "teasers" simply stating "the Camels are coming", a play on the old Scottish folk song "The Campbells Are Coming". Another promotion was "Old Joe", a circus camel driven through towns to attract attention and distribute free cigarettes. The brand's slogan, used for decades, was "I'd walk a mile for a Camel!"

The iconic style of Camel is the original unfiltered cigarette sold in a soft pack, known as Camel Straights or Regulars. Its popularity peaked through the brand's use by famous personalities such as news broadcaster Edward R. Murrow, whose usage of them was so heavy and so public that the smoking of a Camel no-filter became his trademark.

In 1999, Japan Tobacco International gained ownership of the rights to sell Camel outside the United States. The tobacco blend of the non-American Camel contains less Oriental tobacco and a higher proportion of Burley.

On July 1, 2000, an "Oriental" variety of Camel was introduced, followed by Turkish Gold, a regular cigarette, in 2000, and Turkish Jade, a menthol, in 2001. In 2005 Camel added its name on the cigarette paper and changed the filter color and design on its Oriental version, which was subsequently discontinued, but then reinstated. Also in 2005, Turkish Silvers were introduced, an ultralight version positioned in strength below Turkish Gold "lights" and "full flavor" Turkish Royal. Various Camel Crush and Camel Click cigarettes have also been created and are some of the most popular Camel variants being sold.

In 2012, Camel was surpassed by Pall Mall as R. J. Reynolds' most popular brand.

In 2013, Camel celebrated its 100th anniversary.

== Marketing ==
=== Graphic design ===
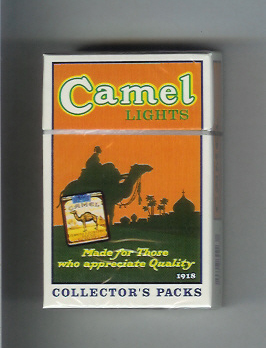
Camel Collector's Pack of 1918

The photograph used for the Camel design was taken on September 29, 1913, by Andrew Jackson Farrell, a Winston-Salem based photographer. Farrell and Mr. R. C. Haberkern of the Reynolds Tobacco Company went to the Barnum & Bailey Circus to photograph a camel and a dromedary to use in the design for a "brand of Turkish Cigarettes which we [Reynolds Tobacco] are about to put on the market."

- "The label's background of temples, minarets, an oasis, and pyramids was much like it is today, but the camel in the foreground was a pathetic, one-humped beast with short, pointed ears, two-pronged hoofs and a drooping neck. Is this a camel? the Reynolds people asked each other. Consulting the "Encyclopedia Britannica", they learned that a one-humped dromedary could indeed be called a camel, although no one was too pleased with the creature's looks. Luckily, Barnum & Bailey came to town. Monday, September 29, 1913, Roy C. Haberkern, Reynolds' young secretary, went to investigate. With a photographer (Andrew Jackson Farrell), he visited the circus menagerie and found not only a dromedary, but a two-humped camel as well. When the animal's boss refused permission to photograph them, Haberkern pointed out that Reynolds had always closed offices and factories for the circus, a practice that could easily be discontinued. The trainer relented, but demanded a written release from the company. Haberkern raced back to the closed office building, climbed through a window, wrote the agreement, and signed Reynolds' name to it. Back at the fairgrounds the circus man conceded and brought out the two animals. The camel posed willingly, but Old Joe, the dromedary, wouldn't hold still. The trainer gave him a slap on the nose. Old Joe raised his tail, threw back his ears and closed his eyes as the shutter snapped. From that photograph an improved label was designed and Old Joe became the most famous dromedary in the world."

The Reynolds company commissioned Fred Otto Kleesattel in 1913 to draw the original artwork. The signature scene on most Camel cigarette packs shows a single dromedary, the smallest of the three species of camel, standing on desert sand, with pyramids and palm trees in the background. The back features bazaars and mosques. On European and some other non-U.S. versions, the desert motifs have been replaced by health warnings. On others, Kleesattel included "Manneken Pis", a historical figure of Brussels.

Known as "Fritz", Kleesattel was a highly sought after graphic designer living in Louisville, Kentucky. He was hired through his company, Klee Ad Art, to design the packaging for the new Camel cigarettes' line. Klee Ad Art was also integral in devising designs for Four Roses Distillery, Heaven Hill Distilleries, and many other now immediately recognizable U.S. brands. While serving in the U.S. Army during World War I, Kleesattel worked as a camouflage artist, disguising buildings, vehicles, and other potential targets by making them blend with their surroundings.

=== Ad campaigns ===
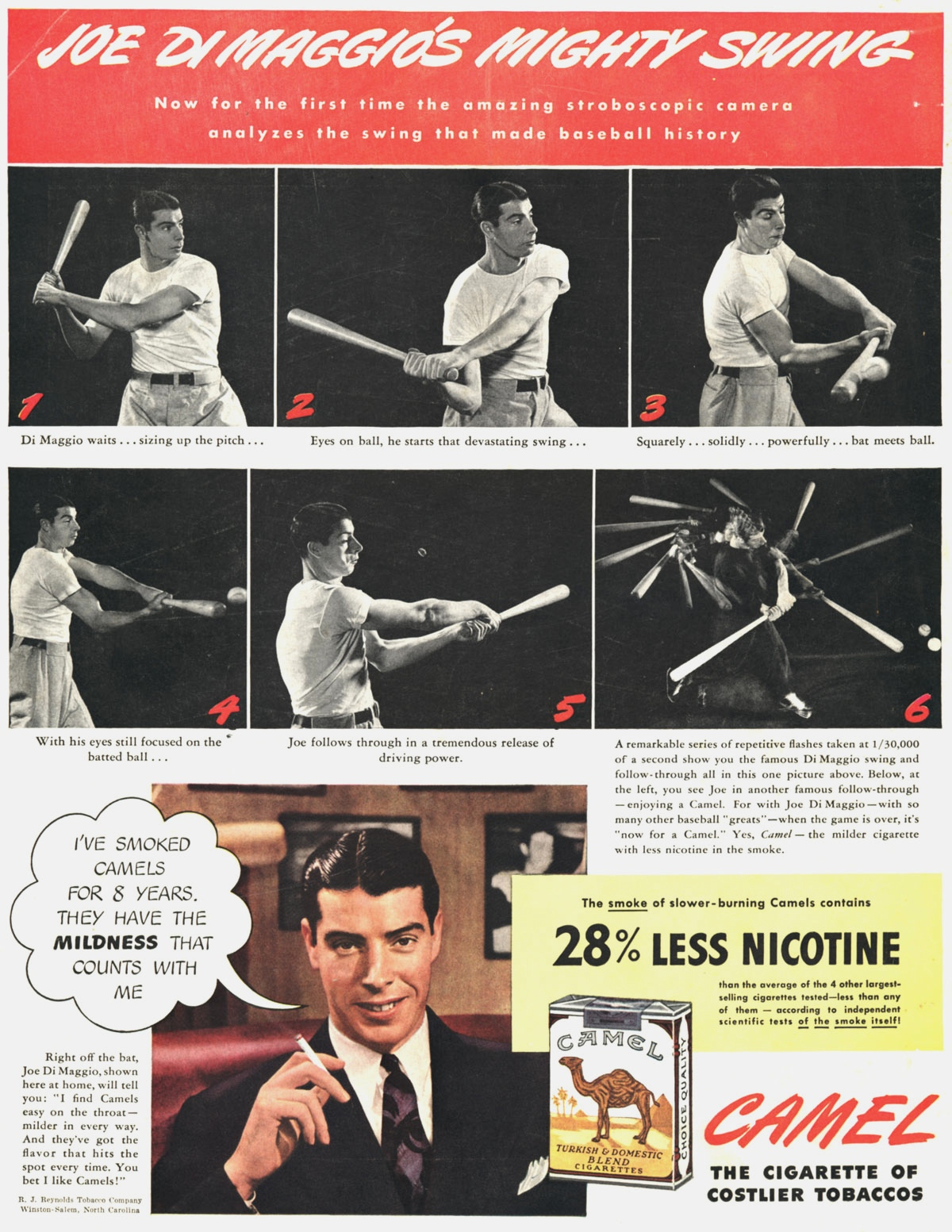
Advertisement featuring Joe DiMaggio in 1941

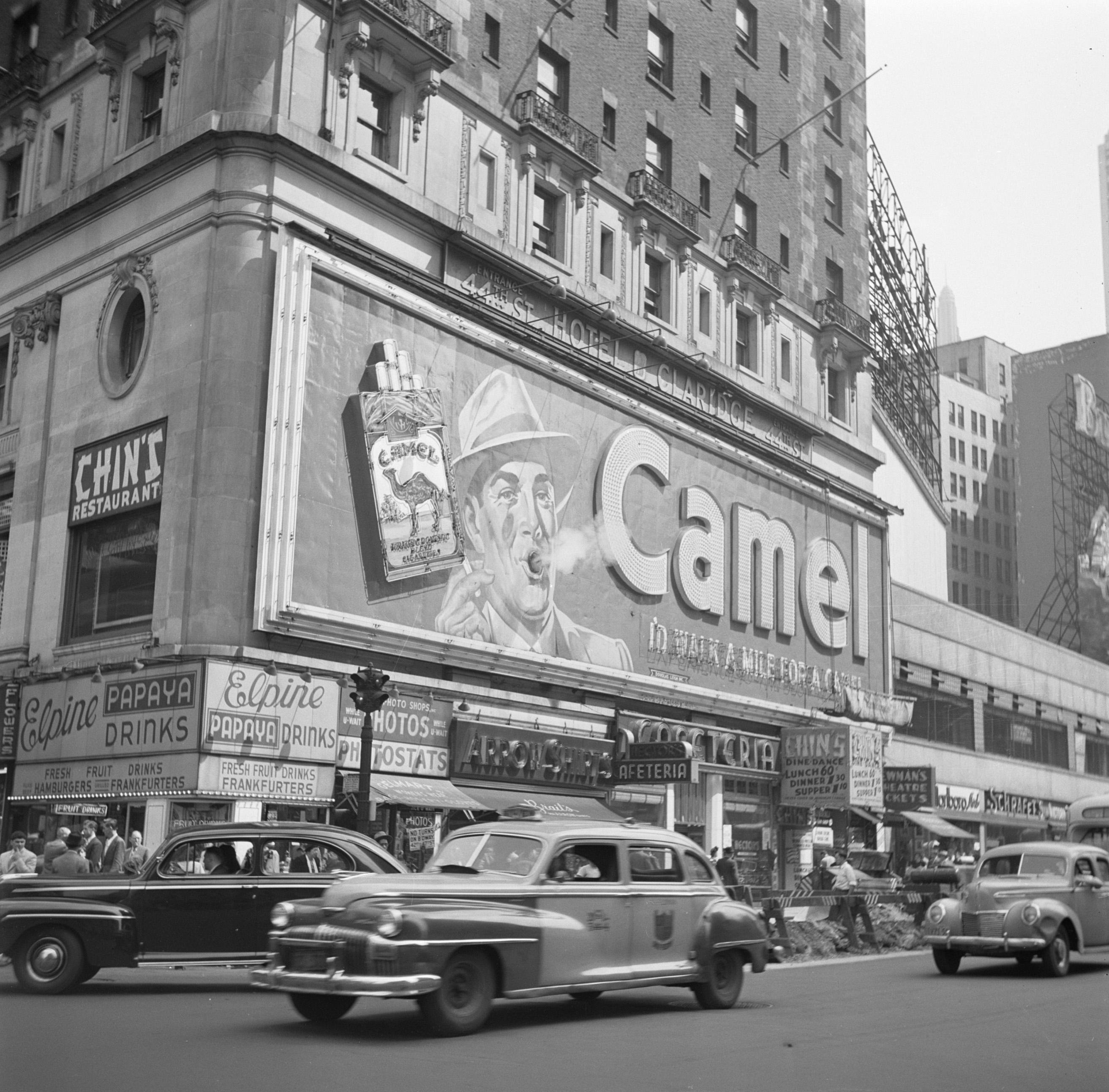
The well-known "smoking man" Camel advert billboard, on the Hotel Claridge, Times Square, 1948

In an apparent attempt to counter Lucky Strike's popular "It's Toasted" campaign, Camel went in the opposite direction by boasting that Camel was a "fresh" cigarette "never parched or toasted."

In 1936, Camel used the slogan "For digestion's sake – smoke Camels." The ads ran from 1936 to 1939. In 1951, over a decade after the ad campaign ended, the FTC issued a cease-and-desist order prohibiting R. J. Reynolds Tobacco Company (RJR) from claiming that Camels aided digestion in any respect.

In 1941, Camel installed a 30-by-100-foot (9.1 by 30.5 m) billboard on the east side of Times Square, New York. Designed by Douglas Leigh, this showed a smoking man, with steam coming from his mouth every few seconds to represent cigarette smoke. The man depicted was replaced periodically (during World War II, the billboard showed servicemen in uniform). The billboard became a famous landmark and remained in place until 1966.

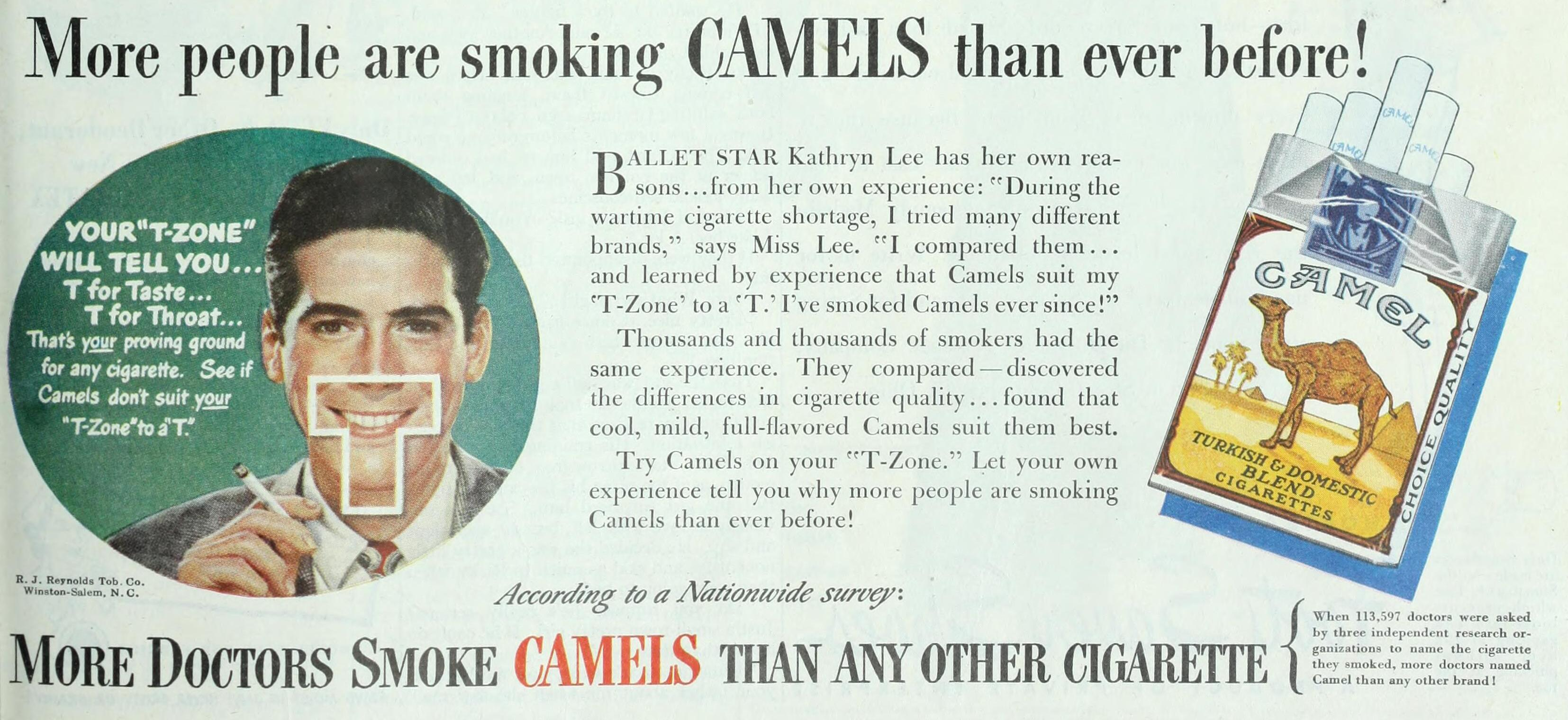
Part of a 1948 advert describing the brand as being preferred by doctors, and illustrating Camel's throat and taste "T-Zone"

In 1946, Camel advertised their cigarettes as being the favorite choice among doctors "from every branch of medicine", making smokers believe it was safe to smoke them. The slogan "More doctors smoke Camels than any other cigarette" became the mainstay of Camel advertising until 1952. Ads featuring the slogan were seen in a range of media, including medical journals such as the Journal of the American Medical Association, television commercials, popular radio programs such as Abbott and Costello and magazines such as Life and Time. The slogan was claimed to be based on surveys by "three leading independent research organizations"; however, these surveys were conducted by R. J. Reynolds's advertising agency, the William Esty Company, and included free cigarettes for the doctors who were interviewed.

In late 1987, RJR created "Joe Camel" as a brand mascot. In 1991, the American Medical Association published a report stating that 5- and 6-year-olds could more easily recognize Joe Camel than Mickey Mouse, Fred Flintstone, Bugs Bunny, or even Barbie. This led the association to ask RJR to terminate the Joe Camel campaign. RJR declined, but further appeals followed in 1993 and 1994. On July 10, 1997, the Joe Camel campaign was retired and replaced with a more adult campaign which appealed to the desires of its mid-20s target market. Camel paid millions of dollars to settle lawsuits accusing them of using Joe Camel to market smoking to children.

=== Camel Boots ===
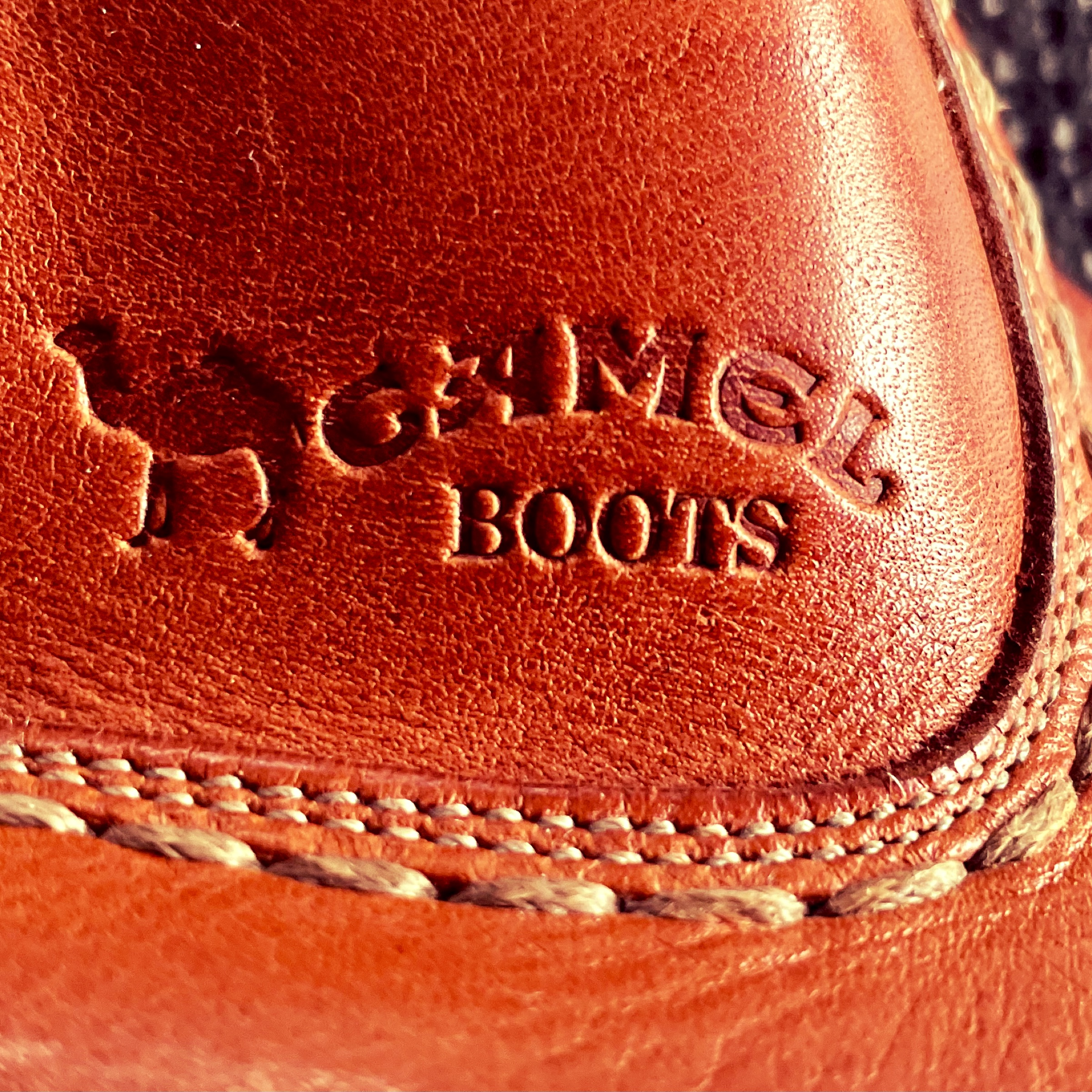
Camel Boots. Logo

Another marketing tool is the in-house fashion brand CAMEL BOOTS. The focus here is on robust, durable, high-quality shoes and clothing for outdoor activities and adventurers. The fashion brand has since been renamed camel active.

=== Camel Cash ===
"Camel Cash", or "C-Note", was a promotional ticket stuck to the back of filtered varieties of Camel cigarettes. It was made to vaguely resemble currency and could be exchanged for items from the Camel Cash catalog. It could not be used, however, to purchase Camel tobacco products.

The artwork changed many times over the years, and in the past included the face of Joe Camel, much in the same way as presidents are featured on American currency; later designs just used a Camel silhouette like the one on the Camel logo, after Joe Camel was discontinued. Camel Cash redemption expired on March 31, 2007, angering some smokers who had been saving up the "cash" for years only to find it worthless.

==== Break free adventure ====
In 2010, R. J. Reynolds planned to sell Camel packs showing one of 10 locations to be visited by the Camel mascot, including Seattle, Washington; Austin, Texas; San Francisco; Las Vegas; New Orleans; Bonneville Salt Flats; Sturgis, South Dakota; Route 66; and the Williamsburg neighborhood of Brooklyn. The Winston-Salem package showed a tobacco field and the city's skyline, including the former R. J. Reynolds headquarters. During a 10-week period, visitors to a website were asked to guess which city would be next. Matthew Myers, president of Campaign for Tobacco-Free Kids, accused the company of targeting children once again, saying, "The new campaign cynically uses the names and images of trendy U.S. destinations ... in an attempt to make Camel cigarettes cool again." David Howard of R. J. Reynolds emphasized the campaign was geared toward adults and pointed out only adults could access the website.

New York City health commissioner Thomas Farley and the National Association of Attorneys General both sent Reynolds letters asking that the campaign be stopped. The organization said that it violated the 1998 tobacco settlement. Reynolds denied that children were being targeted and said the campaign did not go against the settlement. Other cities and states also stated their objections, including San Francisco and Seattle.

== 'Hidden' camel images ==
According to a legend, the artist who drew the image of the camel was Belgian and did not like the marketing manager of Camel so he introduced a design of Manneken Pis (a bronze statue of a very typical urinating child from Belgium). When examined closely, some people claim to see a man with an erection in the shadows on the camel's left leg. Another legend says the leg image is a nude woman. Some people claim that you can see the image of a baboon or another type of monkey on the back of the dromedary, some even say that you can see eagles near the head and a fish in the central area. It is considered unlikely that these images were drawn on purpose, rather they are the product of the shading of the drawing.

== Sponsorship ==
=== Formula One ===
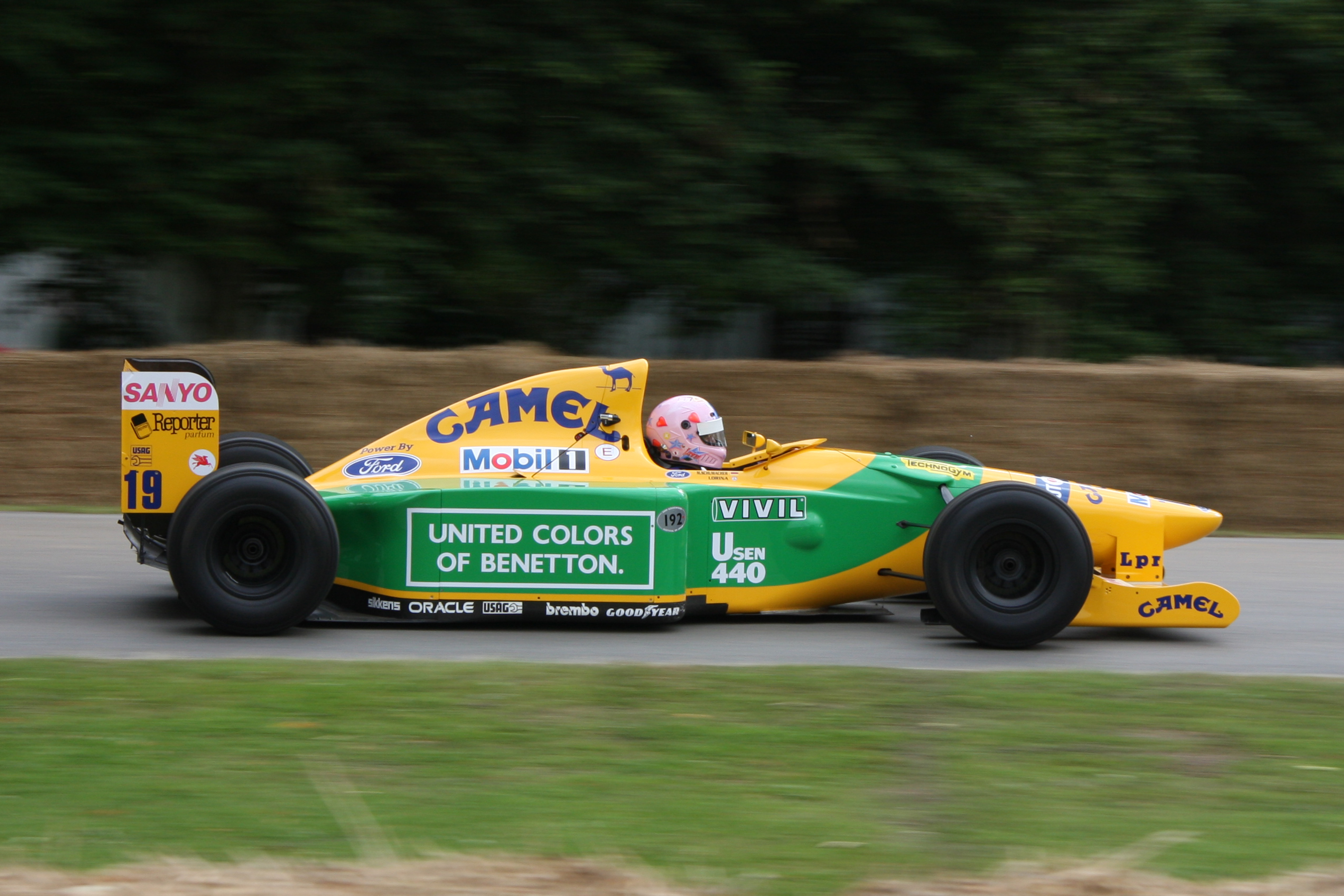
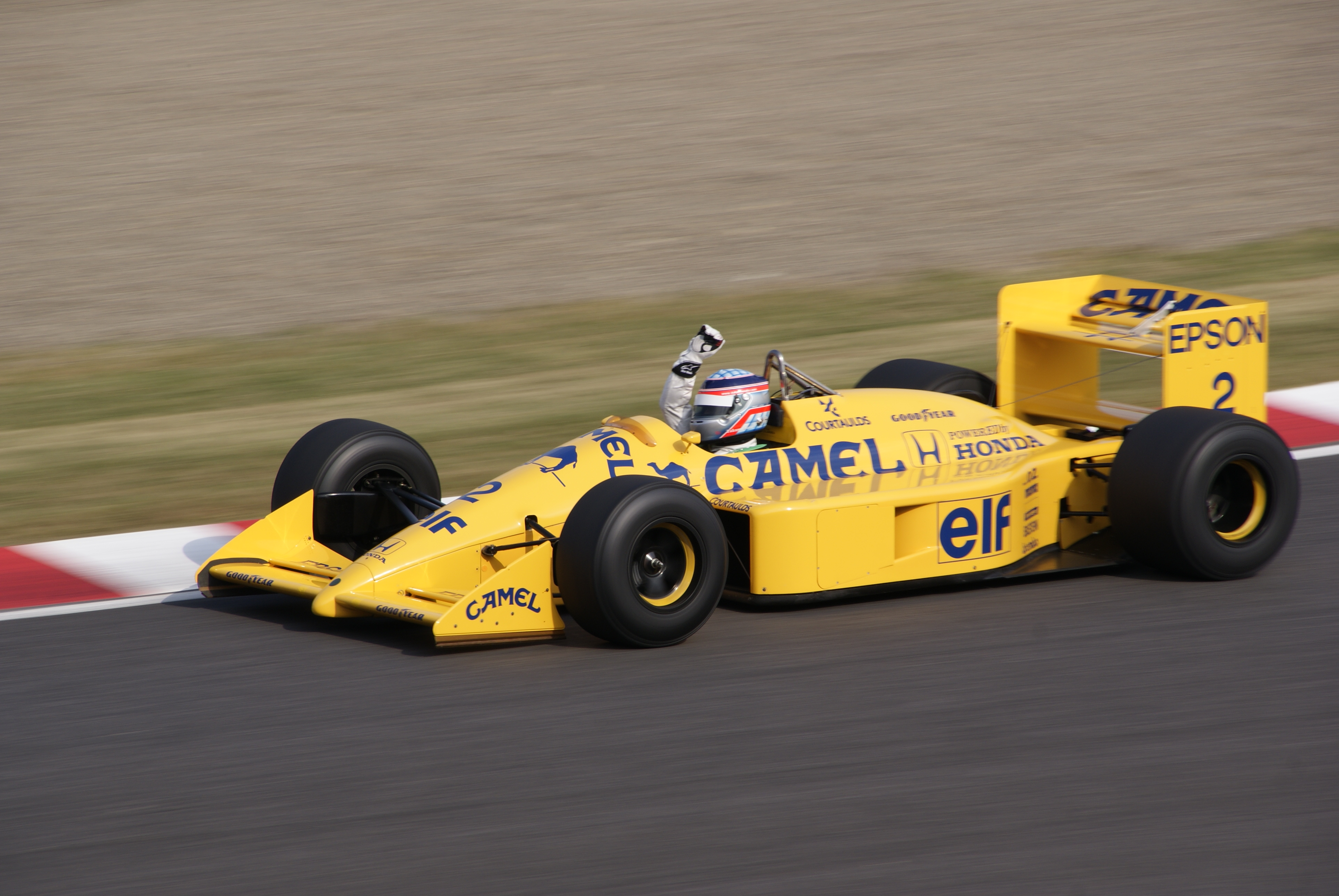
A Benetton B192 being demonstrated at the 2008 Goodwood Festival of Speed (pictured top) and Takuma Sato driving a Lotus 100T before the 2010 Japanese Grand Prix

Camel has been a sponsor of various Formula One teams since 1987:

- AGS (1989) - The logos were placed on the side of the cars, and on the drivers' helmets. In races where tobacco sponsorship was forbidden, the Camel name was replaced with the Camel logo instead.
- Benetton Formula 1 (1988 – 1989, 1991 – 1993) - In the 1988-89 seasons, Camel was a smaller sponsor and the logos were displayed on the side of the car and on the side of the drivers' helmets only. Camel became the main sponsor from the 1991 season until the 1993 season, and the logos were more prominently shown on the car. In races where tobacco sponsorship was forbidden, the Camel name was either replaced with blue gaps, the Camel logo, or the "Benetton" name instead.
- Larrousse F1 (1988 – 1989) - The logos were displayed on the top of the nose section, right in the front of the driver, on the side of the car and on the drivers' helmets.
- Team Lotus (1987 – 1990)
- Minardi (1988) - The logos were shown on the side of the car.
- Tyrrell Racing (1988 – 1989) - In 1988, the logos were displayed on the top of the car, on the front of the nose, on the top side of the rear wing and on the driver's helmets because it was a minor sponsor, but in 1989 Camel was the main sponsor and the logos were more prominently shown. In races where tobacco sponsorship was forbidden, the Camel name was replaced with the Camel logo instead.
- Williams F1 (1991 – 1993) - The logos were shown on top of the car, on the top and side of the nose, right in front of the driver and on the driver's helmets. In races where tobacco sponsorship was forbidden, the Camel name was replaced with either the Camel logo or with "Williams" instead.

=== Grand Prix motorcycle racing ===
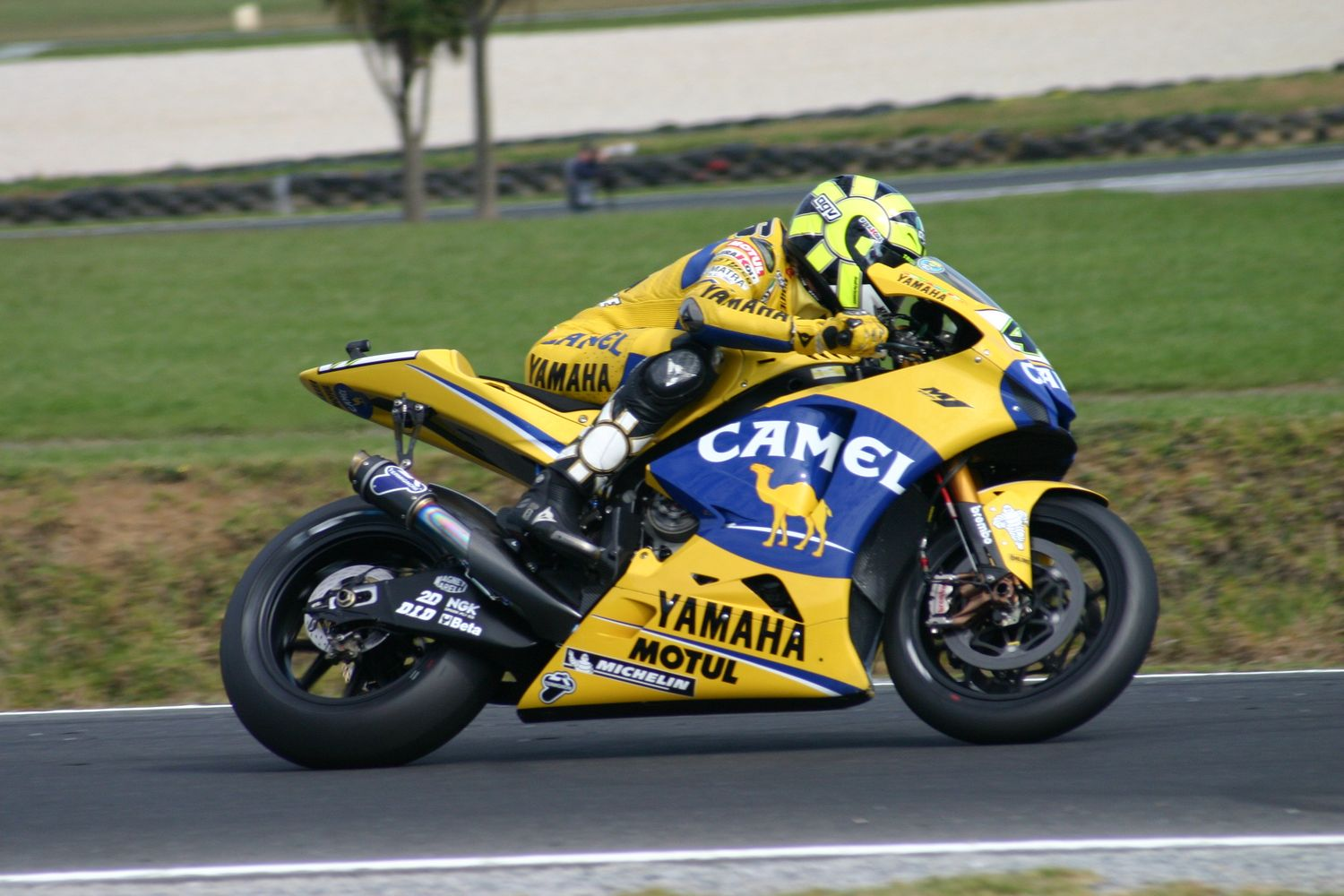
Valentino Rossi at Camel Yamaha color in 2006

- Pons Racing (2003 – 2005) - JT International and the Honda Pons team have revealed the birth of a new partnership that will see the tobacco giant's Camel brand holding title sponsorship rights of the MotoGP operation from 2003 to 2005. The logos were shown on the side of the bike.
- Yamaha MotoGP Factory Team (2006) - The Yamaha MotoGP team in collaboration with JTI carried Camel sponsorship in the 2006 season. The cigarette company replaced Gauloises who had previously been the main sponsor of the team. JTI has been involved in the top level of the sport for several years, and has been a sponsor in MotoGP for the last three years. In the 2006 season Valentino Rossi and Colin Edwards rode motorcycles with the Camel Yamaha Team titles.

=== Camel Trophy ===
Camel sponsored the Camel Trophy, a vehicle-oriented off-road competition that was held annually between 1980 and 2000. It was best known for its use of Land Rover vehicles over challenging terrain.

== See also ==
- Tobacco industry in Egypt
- Camel Trophy
