= Jack Ayre =

Canadian pianist

Ivor Ayre
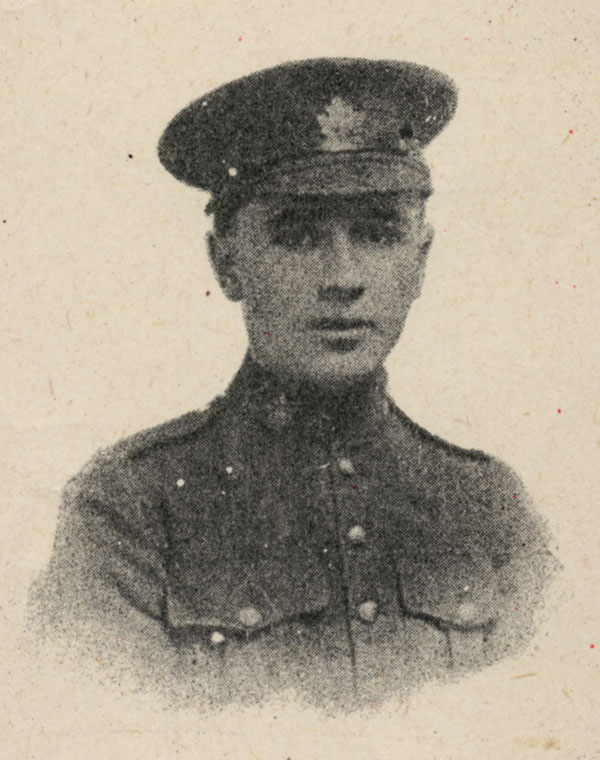
- Born: 1894
- Died: 1977 (aged 82–83)
- Military career
- Allegiance: Canada
- Branch: Canadian Expeditionary Force
- Rank: Corporal
- Nickname: Jack
- Unit: 3rd Canadian Division
- Conflicts: First World War
- Other work: pianist

Ivor (Jack) Ayre (1894–1977) was a Canadian pianist and a member of the Dumbells, which entertained Canadian troops during the First World War. He continued to perform with the Dumbells when they reformed as a civilian touring group performing songs, skits and musicals across Canada, the United States and the United Kingdom.

== Career ==
=== First World War ===
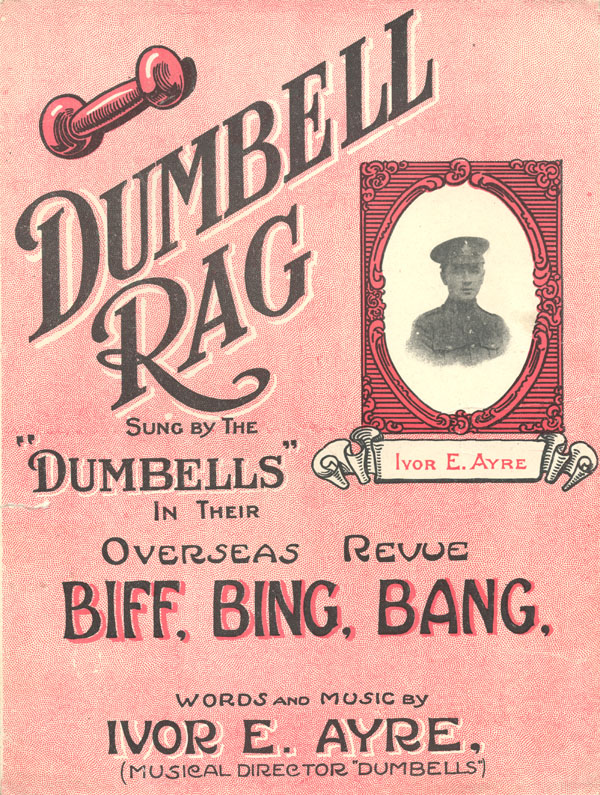
The sheet music for the Dumbell Rag sold more than 10 000 copies

Ayre began his career as a pianist for silent films in Toronto. He enlisted in the Canadian army as a private after the outbreak of the First World War. Soon after, he came to the attention of Captain Mert Plunkett, who selected Ayre to be a pianist for the 3rd Canadian Division Concert Party, known as the Dumbells. Ayre served with the Dumbells until the war ended, attaining the rank of Corporal during the war. He composed The Dumbell Rag while still a soldier; the piece went on to sell more than ten thousand copies of sheet music.

=== Civilian tours ===
After the war, the Dumbells reformed as a civilian traveling band and variety show. Ayre served as the pianist, musical director and sometimes conductor for the band. He became the first Canadian to conduct an orchestra in a hit Broadway show, when he served as conductor for the musical Biff, Bing, Bang at the Ambassador Theatre in New York. The Dumbells dissolved in 1932, but Ayre continued to perform on the piano in various venues until his death.

Toward the end of his life, Ayre participated in a reunion performance of the Dumbells in 1975 at Lambert Lodge in Toronto.
