= Montgomery Saltbox Houses =

Historic houses in Ohio, United States

- U.S. National Register of Historic Places
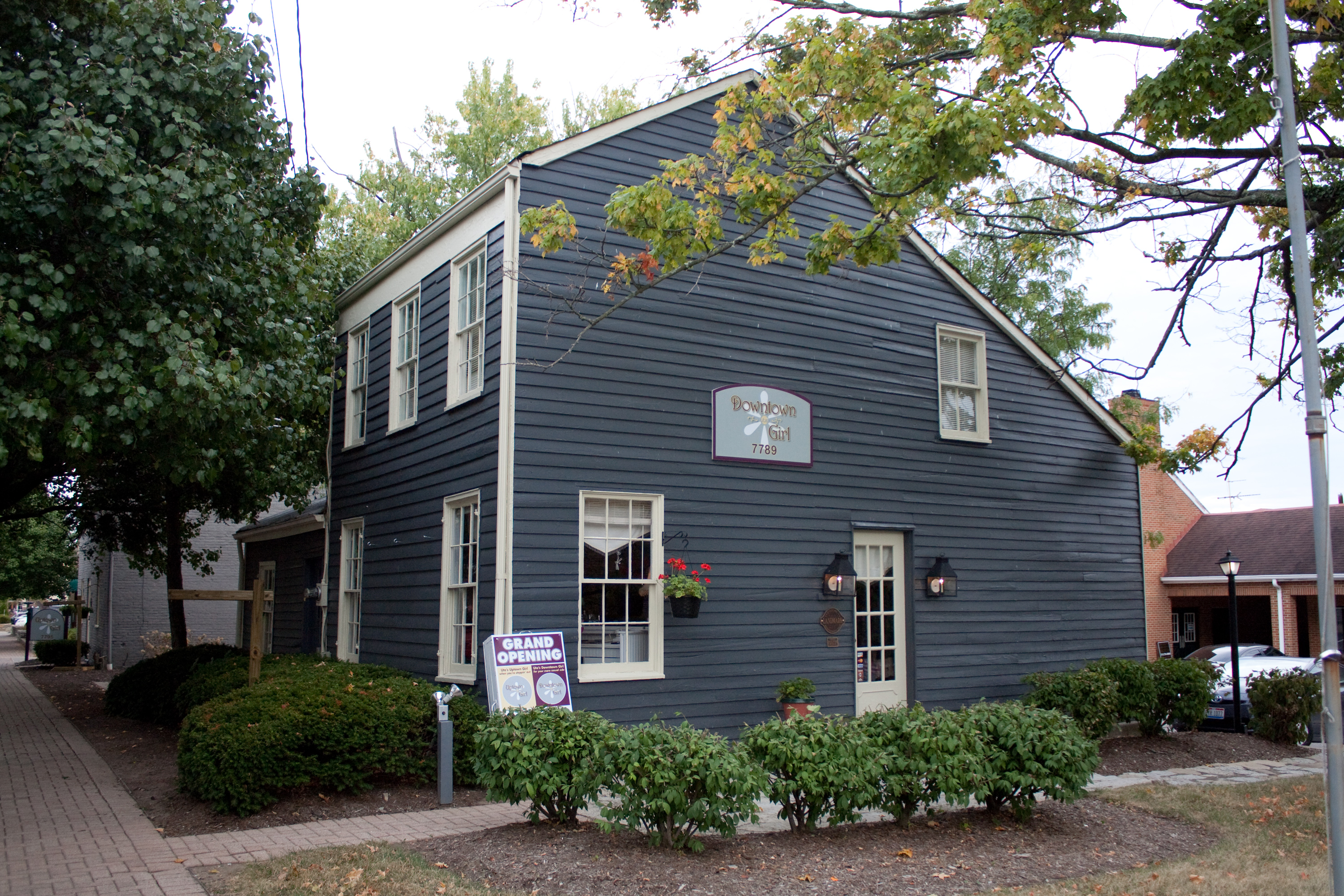
- West Salt Box House

- Location within Ohio Location within the United States
- Location: 7789 and 7795 Cooper Rd., Montgomery, Ohio
- Coordinates: 39°13′35.2″N 84°21′24″W
- Area: less than one acre
- Built: 1800
- Architectural style: Saltbox
- NRHP reference No.: 87001254
- Added to NRHP: July 28, 1987

The Montgomery Saltbox Houses are a pair of historic saltbox houses in Montgomery, Ohio, United States. Built in 1800, they were constructed as homes for some of the city's founding families, who settled in the area in the spring of 1795 after travelling from Montgomery in eastern New York in the aftermath of the signing of the Treaty of Greenville. Although one house is brick and the other wood, they are otherwise very similar; both have been called fine examples of a style often seen in the northeastern United States but virtually never in southwestern Ohio.

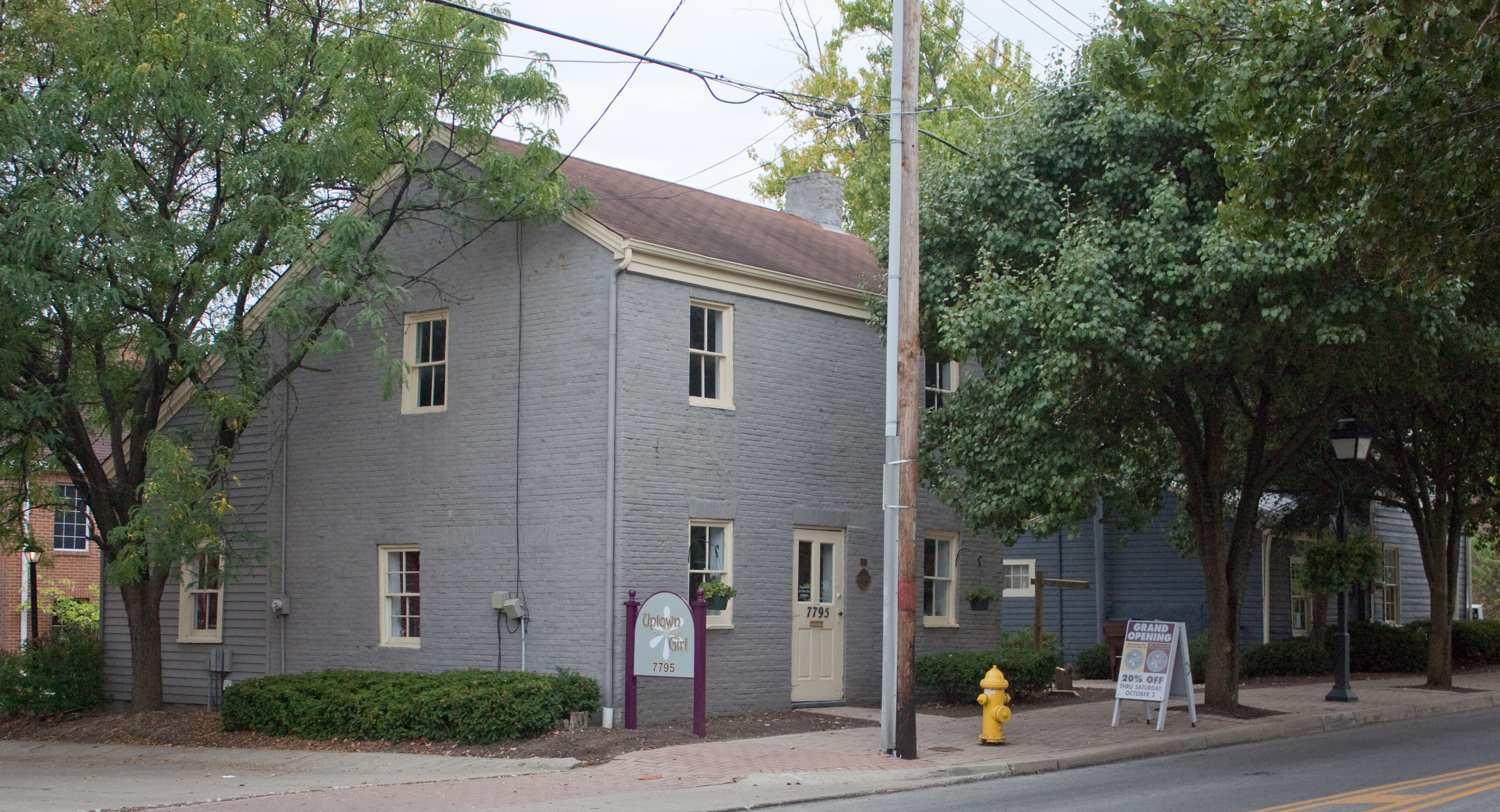
East Salt Box House

The city of Montgomery was platted along the east-west Cooper Road, but aside from the Saltbox Houses, few historic buildings remain along this street. After Columbus became the state capital, the present Montgomery Road, the old north–south street, became much more heavily travelled, and later development was concentrated along this road. As a result, few other buildings remain from the original plat of the community. In 1987, the houses were listed together on the National Register of Historic Places. They are among five locations in Montgomery that are listed on the Register, along with the Blair House, the Universalist Church Historic District, the Wilder-Swaim House, and the Yost Tavern.

== See also ==
- Mason House, a saltbox in southeastern Ohio
