= Yost Tavern =

- U.S. National Register of Historic Places
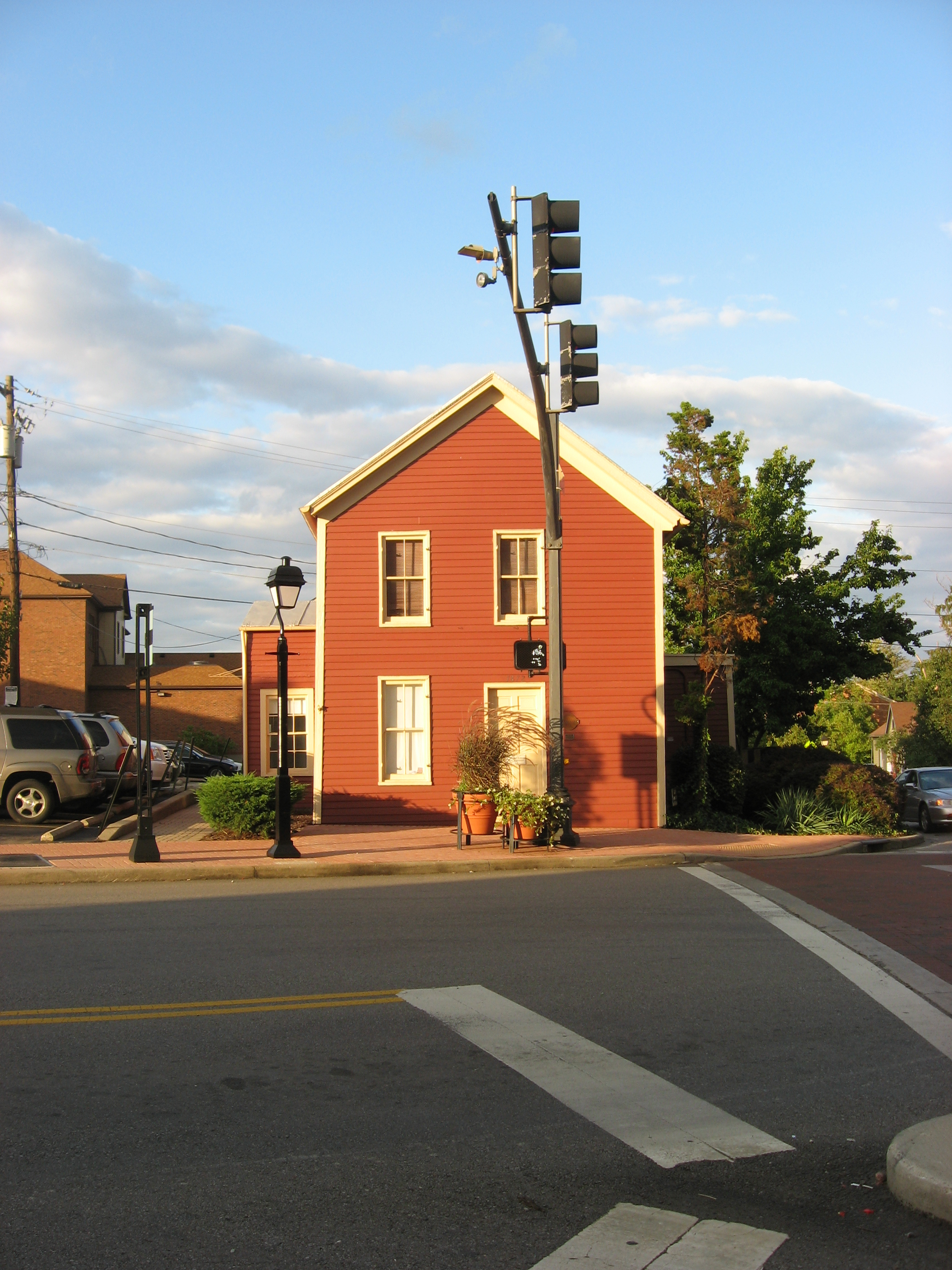
- Front of the tavern

- Location within Ohio Location within the United States
- Location: 7872 Cooper Rd., Montgomery, Ohio
- Coordinates: 39°13′35″N 84°21′15″W
- Area: 0.1 acres (0.040 ha)
- Architectural style: Vernacular, 2-Story Rectangular
- NRHP reference No.: 93000406
- Added to NRHP: May 6, 1993

The Yost Tavern is a historic former inn in the city of Montgomery, Ohio, United States. Built in 1805, when Montgomery was founded, it remained in operation as a lodging establishment until a long period of use as a house, and it was donated to the city after being owned by the local Kiwanis chapter. It has also been named a historic site.

Abraham Yost both lived and operated a tavern in the building, and his business flourished because of its location along the highway to Cincinnati. He built the structure in 1805, the year in which the village of Montgomery was incorporated. Within four years, Columbus-bound traffic was causing business to boom; Yost's customers purchased more than fifty barrels of whiskey in 1809 alone. After Yost, the building became a house alone; White Miller bought it in 1870, and his descendants remained in ownership and in residence until 1968. In the latter year, the community's Kiwanis club purchased the property, donated some of the chattels to the local historical society, and sold the remnant at public auction. The club retained the tavern for just eleven years before giving it to the Montgomery city government in 1979.

Architecturally, the tavern is a simple gable-front structure with a rear lean-to. The two-story facade is pierced by four openings (a doorway and window on the first floor, and two windows on the second), with another entrance to the side. The walls are weatherboarded, set on a stone foundation and covered by a metal roof.

In 1993, the old tavern was listed on the National Register of Historic Places, qualifying because of its significant importance in community history. It is one of five locations in Montgomery to be listed on the Register, along with the Blair House, the Montgomery Saltbox Houses, the Universalist Church Historic District, and the Wilder-Swaim House. The building also has been designated as a local landmark by the Montgomery city government.
