= Blair House (Montgomery, Ohio) =

Historic house in Ohio, United States

- U.S. National Register of Historic Places
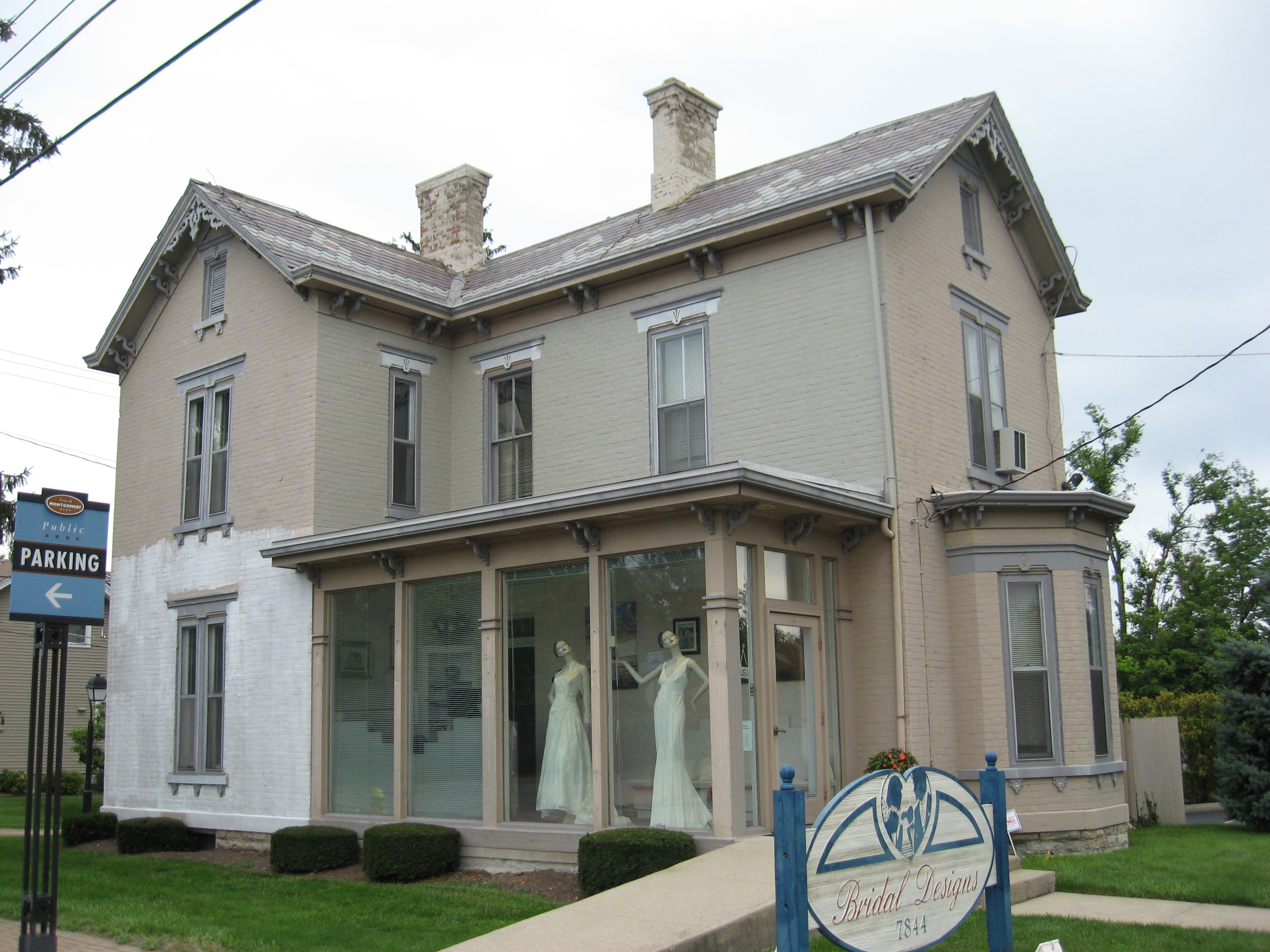
- Front and side of the house

- Location within Ohio Location within the United States
- Location: 7844 Remington Rd., Montgomery, Ohio
- Coordinates: 39°13′42″N 84°21′34″W
- Area: less than one acre
- Built: 1875
- Architect: James Madison Blair
- Architectural style: Italianate
- NRHP reference No.: 82001466
- Added to NRHP: November 30, 1982

The Blair House is a historic house in the city of Montgomery, Ohio, United States. One of the best examples of Victorian-period Italianate architecture in the city, it was built for butcher James Blair and his wife Anne in 1875. A brick structure with a slate roof, it is a two-story structure built in the plan of the letter "L." Among its distinctive architectural elements are the ornamented single-story bay, the brackets that support the eaves of the roof, and the corbelled chimneys.

In 1982, the Blair House was listed on the National Register of Historic Places because of its well-preserved historic architecture. Its date makes it close to unique; most of the city's remaining nineteenth-century buildings were erected before 1850, and almost no other Victorian structures have survived to the present day. It is one of five locations in Montgomery that is listed on the Register, along with the Montgomery Saltbox Houses, the Universalist Church Historic District, the Wilder-Swaim House, and the Yost Tavern.
