= Universalist Church Historic District =

Historic district in Ohio, United States

Coordinates: 39°13′41.5″N 84°21′15.8″W

- U.S. National Register of Historic Places
- U.S. Historic district
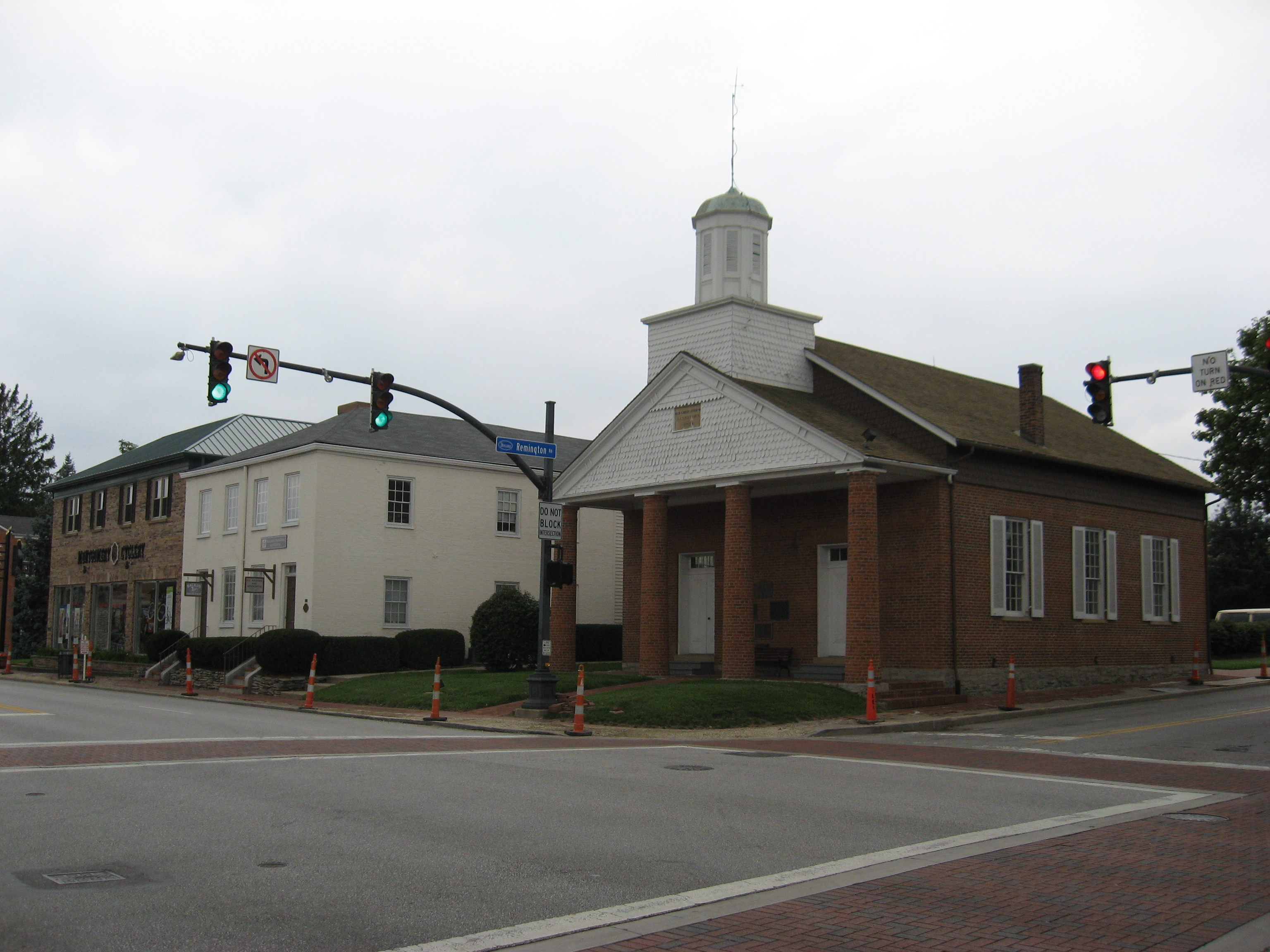

- Location within Ohio Location within the United States
- Location: Montgomery, Ohio
- Area: 10 acres (40,000 m^{2})
- Architect: James Jones
- Architectural style: Federal and Classical Revival
- NRHP reference No.: 70000498
- Added to NRHP: December 2, 1970

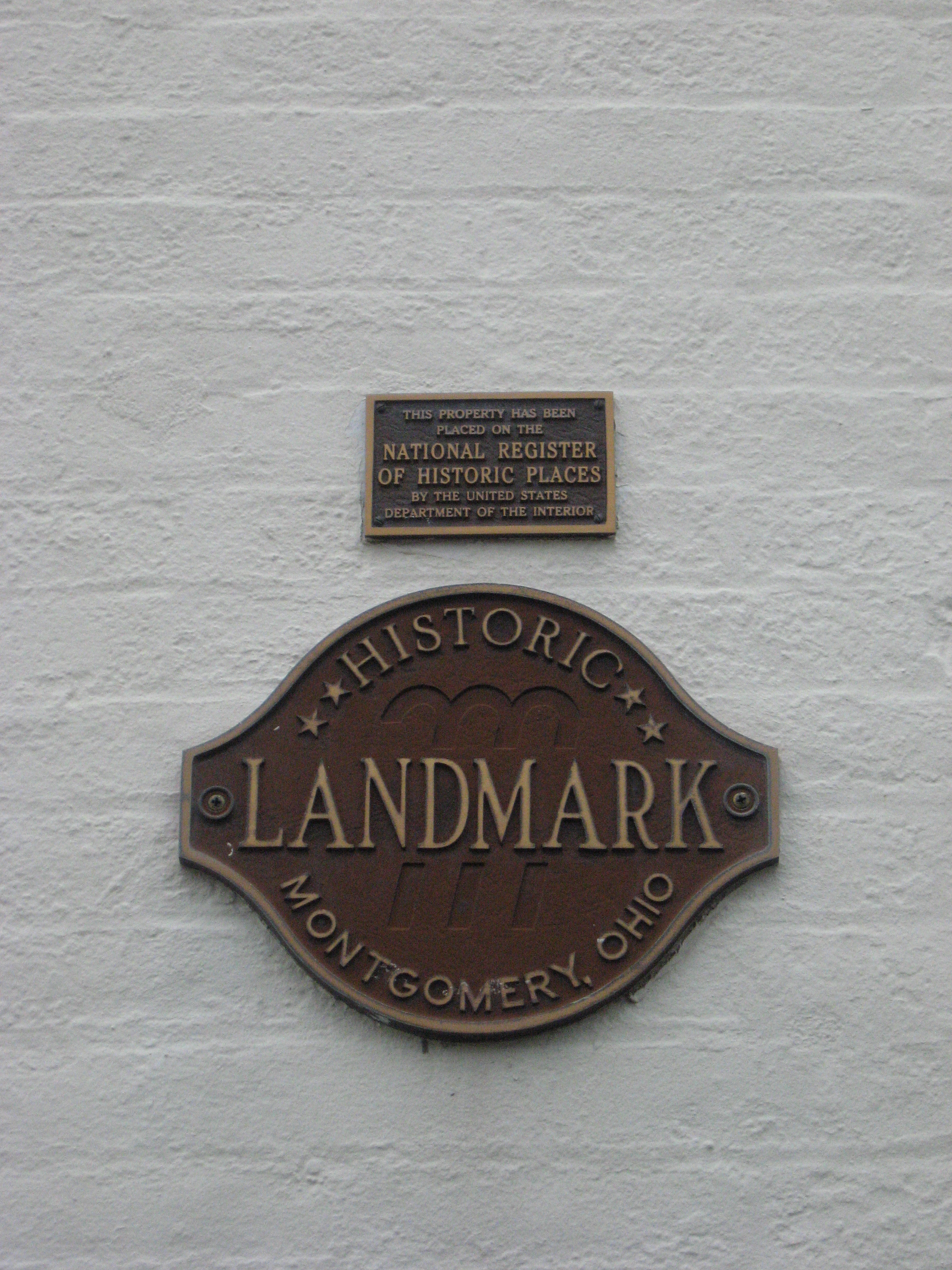
Plaque signifying one of the buildings as a part of the National Register of Historic Places.

Universalist Church Historic District is a registered historic district in Montgomery, Ohio, listed in the National Register of Historic Places on December 2, 1970. It contains 3 contributing buildings.

It is one of five locations in Montgomery that is listed on the Register, along with the Blair House, the Montgomery Saltbox Houses, the Wilder-Swaim House, and the Yost Tavern.

== Historic uses ==
- Religious Structure
- Church Related Residence
