= Mark P. Painter =

American judge

Mark Philip Painter (born April 6, 1947), served from 1995–2009 as a judge of the Ohio 1st District Court of Appeals in Hamilton County (Cincinnati), after 13 years on the Hamilton County Municipal Court. In March 2009, Painter became the first American to be elected by the United Nations General Assembly to the United Nations Appeals Tribunal. In 2012, Painter resigned from the Appeals Tribunal and joined the Cincinnati law firm Manley Burke as Of counsel.

== Early life and education ==
A native Cincinnatian, Painter grew up in the city of Blue Ash a Cincinnati suburb, and was a member of the Sycamore High School Class of 1965. He went on to the University of Cincinnati, where he was elected president of the student body in 1969. He received a juris doctor degree from the UC College of Law in 1973. Before being appointed to the Hamilton County Municipal Court in 1982, he practiced criminal law and personal injury litigation with Smith & Schnacke, which later became part of the Cincinnati office of Thompson Hine.

== Career ==
A writer, he is the author of six books including The Legal Writer: 40 Rules for the Art of Legal Writing, 130 articles, and more than 400 published court opinions. He wrote a monthly column on legal writing for Lawyers USA. An adjunct professor of law at his alma mater, the University of Cincinnati College of Law, since 1990. He was named the Chesley Distinguished Visiting professor there in 2008. Painter also conducts seminars on legal writing for lawyers and others throughout the United States and internationally as far away as Kuala Lumpur.

Painter was one of seven judges on the first United Nations Appeals Tribunal. Along with the United Nations Dispute Tribunal, the Appeals Tribunal is part of a two-tier system created in 2007 to deal with internal grievances and disciplinary cases. Based in New York City, the Appeals Tribunal will also sit in Geneva, Switzerland, and Nairobi, Kenya.

Both panels were elected by members of the General Assembly. Eighty-seven votes were required. Painter received 124 votes, which was the second most and the same number received by Sophia Adinyir of Ghana. Kamaljit Singh Garewal of India received 154 votes. The terms of the judges of both tribunals are one non-renewable seven-year stint. Painter and four other judges – two on the Appeals and two on the Dispute tribunals – were appointed by the drawing of lots to serve three-year terms, at the end of which they may apply for an additional seven-year term. The other members of the Appeals Tribunal were Inés Weinberg de Roca of Argentina (who was selected by her colleagues as president of the court), Jean Courtial of France, Rose Boyko of Canada, and Luis Maria Simón of Uruguay.

Painter is a Republican.
