= Uible =

Uible is a surname. Notable people with the surname include:

- David Uible (born 1960), American rancher
- Frank R. Uible (1895–1974), American politician
