= Blue Ash Montgomery Symphony Orchestra =

The Blue Ash Montgomery Symphony Orchestra is a professional symphony orchestra based in Blue Ash, Ohio, a northeastern suburb of Cincinnati. It was founded in 1987 as the Blue Ash Symphony Orchestra by Paul Stanbery, who was also its first conductor. The first concert took place on July 5, 1987.

In 2002, the orchestra became the Blue Ash Montgomery Symphony Orchestra. Blue Ash and Montgomery, a neighboring suburb of Cincinnati, provide operating support in equal amounts. Additional funding comes from Arts Wave of Greater Cincinnati, from various charitable foundations in the region, corporate and patron sponsorships and program advertising.

== Members ==
The orchestra comprises 40-50 professional musicians, all members of the American Federation of Musicians, hired on a freelance basis. It presents six concerts annually which are free of charge, including outdoor concerts on Labor Day, Memorial Day and Independence Day. The orchestra also presents the Kindel Memorial Holiday Concert in December and a Valentine's Day concert each February. Concerts take place in Blue Ash Towne Center, Montgomery Park and area churches and schools. The orchestra also performs concerts outside its normal season, e.g. to celebrate the dedication of the National Underground Railroad Freedom Center in Cincinnati in 2004 and at outreach concerts on the grounds of the Clovernook Center for the Blind and Visually Impaired.

Michael Chertock, principal keyboardist of the Cincinnati Symphony Orchestra and assistant professor of piano at the University of Cincinnati College-Conservatory of Music, succeeded Stanbery as conductor in 2002. Chertock is also organist at St. Barnabas Church in Montgomery, artistic director of the Linton Chamber Music Series' Peanut Butter and Jam Sessions for children and a composer.

== Charity ==
BAMSO sponsors an annual concerto competition for local student musicians. Students compete in four categories: strings, keyboard, other acoustic instruments and musicians 13 and under. Winners receive cash awards and performance opportunities with the orchestra.

== Board of directors ==
The orchestra is governed by a 12-member board and its business development manager is Julie Collinsworth. There is also an advisory board and an honorary board comprising supporters of the organization.

== Repertoire ==
BAMSO performance repertoire is wide-ranging, from seasonal and patriotic favorites, to classical and popular music. The orchestra has premiered numerous works, including Chertock's “Freedom’s Torch” for baritone and string orchestra on a modern text from the Hanukkah liturgy in December, 2002 and arias from Evan Mack’s opera Angel of the Amazon in September, 2010. Soloists come from inside and outside the community and have included Bernadette Peters, Peter Cetera, flutist Randolph Bowman, soprano Kara Shay Thompson, mezzo-soprano Catherine Fishlock, baritone William Henry Caldwell, the Cincinnati Boychoir and violinist Timothy Schwarz.

== Associations ==
The Blue Ash Montgomery Symphony Orchestra is a charter member of the Chamber Music Network of Greater Cincinnati. BAMSO is also a member of the League of American Orchestras.

== Mission ==
The mission of the Blue Ash Montgomery Symphony Orchestra is “to provide the citizens of Blue Ash, Montgomery and surrounding areas with an enjoyable, affordable, quality music experience for audiences of all ages.”
