= Sycamore Junior High School =

Sycamore Junior High School may refer to:

- Sycamore Junior High School, Montgomery, Ohio, in the Sycamore Community School District
- Sycamore Junior High School, Orange County, California, in the Anaheim Union High School District
