= Wilder–Swaim House =

Historic house in Ohio, United States

- U.S. National Register of Historic Places
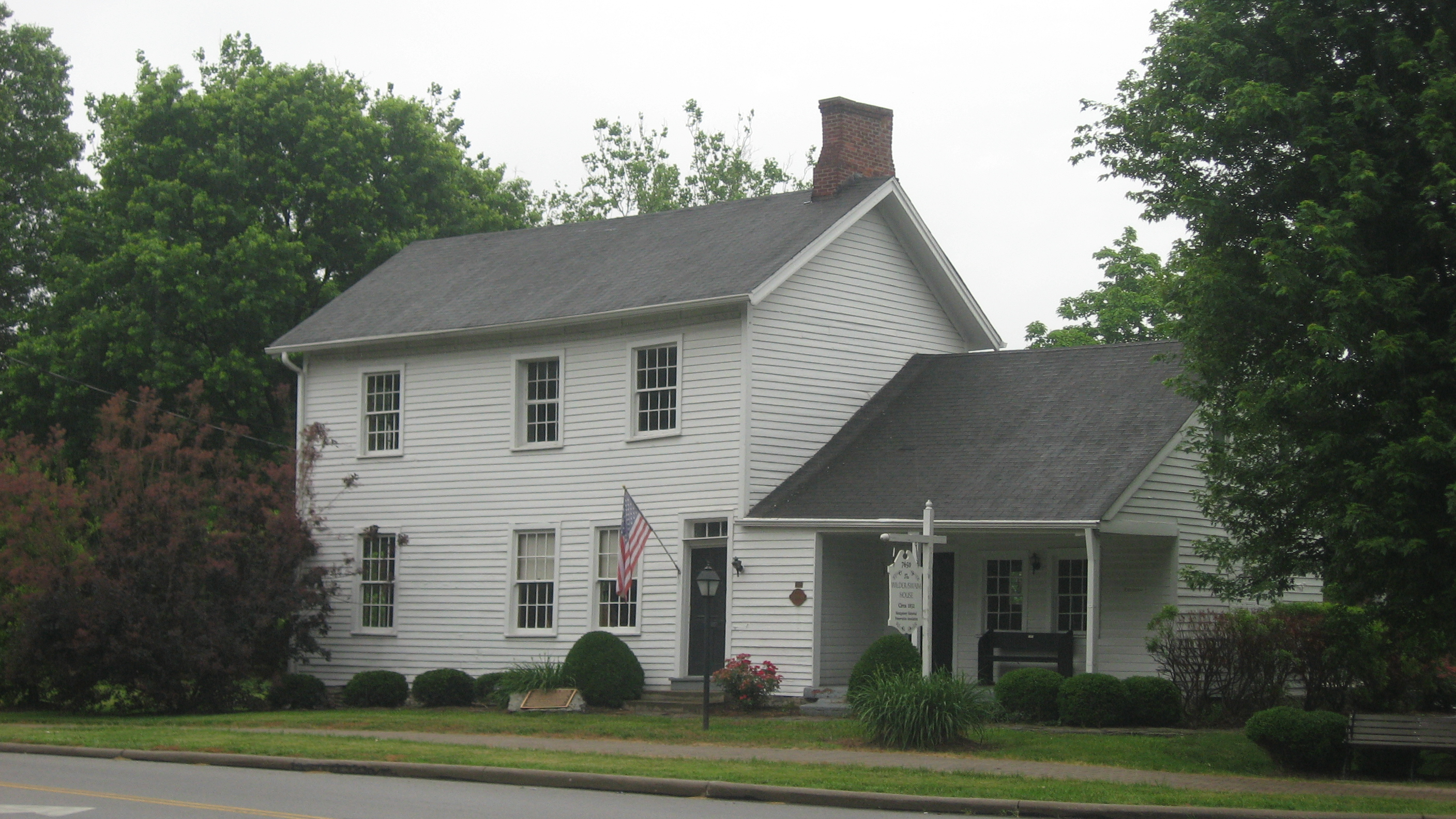
- Front and side of the house

- Location within Ohio Location within the United States
- Location: 7650 Cooper Rd., Montgomery, Ohio
- Coordinates: 39°13′41″N 84°21′36″W
- Area: 0.5 acres (0.20 ha)
- Built: 1815
- Architectural style: Federal
- NRHP reference No.: 81000438
- Added to NRHP: May 20, 1981

The Wilder–Swaim House is a historic house in Montgomery, Ohio, United States. Built in 1815, its oldest portion is a one-and-one-half-story building. Although it is primarily a frame structure, the house includes multiple elements of other materials, such as a brick firewall and a frieze with a bas-relief element. Its name is derived from two families that lived there for many years: the Wilders, resident from 1833 to 1879, and the Swaims, resident from 1917 to 1976.

The most significant event in the house's history was a major expansion around 1840; such an expansion was a common event in early Montgomery as it transitioned from a frontier settlement to an established community. Although most of Montgomery's nineteenth-century buildings date from the first half of the century, houses as old as the Wilder–Swaim House are rare. It has been changed less by time than have many other surviving early houses; as a result, it has been seen as one of the area's best-preserved early Federal structure.

In 1981, the Wilder–Swaim House was listed on the National Register of Historic Places, due to its well-preserved historic architecture. It is one of five locations in Montgomery that is listed on the Register, along with the Blair House, the Montgomery Saltbox Houses, the Universalist Church Historic District, and the Yost Tavern. Today, the house is used by a historic preservation organization known as the Montgomery Historic Preservation Association.
