= Michael Matthews (American football) =

American football player (born 1983)

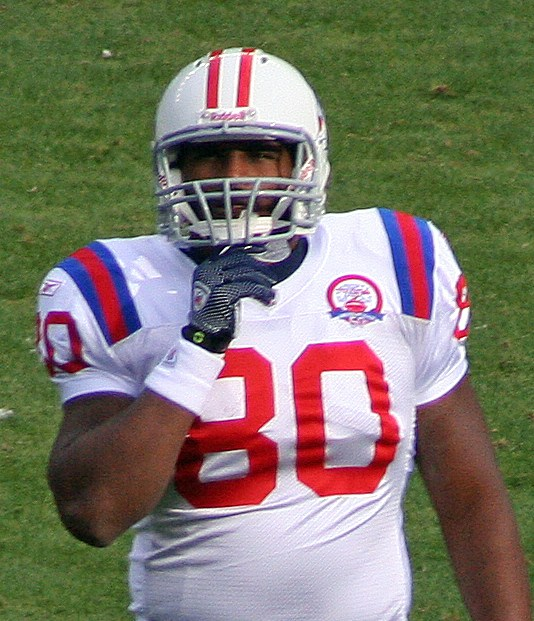
- Matthews during the 2009 NFL season

No. 88, 83, 80, 86, 89
- Position: Tight end

Personal information
- Born: October 9, 1983 (age 43); West Covina, California, U.S.
- Listed height: 6 ft 4 in (1.93 m)
- Listed weight: 270 lb (122 kg)

Career information
- High school: Cincinnati (OH) Sycamore
- College: Georgia Tech
- NFL draft: 2007: undrafted

Career history
- New York Giants (2007–2008); New England Patriots (2009); Detroit Lions (2009); Buffalo Bills (2010)*; Indianapolis Colts (2011)*; Virginia Destroyers (2011)
- * Offseason or practice squad member only

Awards and highlights
- Super Bowl champion (XLII); UFL champion (2011)

Career NFL statistics
- Receptions: 8
- Receiving yards: 54
- Stats at Pro Football Reference

Michael Lee Matthews (born October 9, 1983) is an American former professional football player who was a tight end in the National Football League (NFL). He played college football for the Georgia Tech Yellow Jackets before being signed as an undrafted free agent in 2007.

Matthews earned a Super Bowl ring with the New York Giants in Super Bowl XLII. He was also a member of the New England Patriots, Detroit Lions, Buffalo Bills, Indianapolis Colts, and Virginia Destroyers.

== Early life ==
Matthews attended Sycamore High School in Cincinnati, Ohio and was a student and a letterman in football, basketball, Track, and baseball. In football, he was named as a first-team All-City selection, a second-team All-District selection, and a first-team All-Conference selection. Michael Matthews graduated from Sycamore High School in 2002.

== College years ==
Matthews played collegiately at Georgia Tech for the Yellow Jackets

== Professional career ==
=== New York Giants ===
Matthews was signed by the Giants as an undrafted free agent in 2007. Matthews played in every game for the Giants in the 2007 season as a backup tight end behind Jeremy Shockey and Kevin Boss, in which he was an important contributor to the team's rushing attack with his strong blocking. Matthews went on to win Super Bowl XLII with the Giants; he started the game with Boss in a double tight end formation.

Matthews returned to the Giants to serve as the backup tight end behind Kevin Boss in 2008. Matthews was typically used as a blocking tight end, with Boss being the receiving tight end.

=== New England Patriots ===
Matthews was traded to the New England Patriots on September 5, 2009, in exchange for a conditional 2011 draft pick. He was waived on October 20; the condition for the trade was not met, meaning the Patriots did not surrender a draft choice.

=== Detroit Lions ===
Matthews was signed by the Detroit Lions on December 15, 2009. He was waived on April 20, 2010.

=== Buffalo Bills ===
Matthews signed with the Buffalo Bills on April 21, 2010. He was injury waived on August 23.

=== Virginia Destroyers ===
Matthews was signed by the Virginia Destroyers of the United Football League on May 19, 2011.

=== Indianapolis Colts ===
On August 9, 2011, Matthews signed with the Indianapolis Colts.
