= Sycamore High School (Ohio) =

Location
- 7400 Cornell Road; Cincinnati, Ohio 45242; United States; 39°16′1″N 84°21′7″W

Information
- Type: Public high school
- Opened: 1974
- School district: Sycamore Community School District
- NCES District ID: 3904486
- Superintendent: Chad Lewis
- CEEB code: 360525
- NCES School ID: 390448601741
- Principal: Greg Pottebaum
- Teaching staff: 110.36 (on an FTE basis)
- Grades: 9-12
- Enrollment: 1,677 (2023–2024)
- Student to teacher ratio: 15.20
- Campus type: Suburban
- Color: Forest Green Gold
- Fight song: Across the Field
- Athletics conference: Greater Miami Conference
- Nickname: Aviators/Aves
- Publication: Aviator Vision
- Newspaper: The Leaf
- Yearbook: The Log
- Website: shs.sycamoreschools.org

Sycamore High School is a four-year public high school in Cincinnati, Ohio. It is the only high school in the Sycamore Community School District and offers more than 223 courses including six global languages, more than 20 AP course offerings, and post-AP level classes.

== Campus ==
The schools occupies a 24.6-hectare (61-acre) suburban campus. The original building was designed to accommodate 2000 students in 1974. It was built in a modern style, employing the progressive and experimental open classroom concept wherein no permanent walls separated the classrooms. It has since been expanded and internal walls have been added as the school has grown.

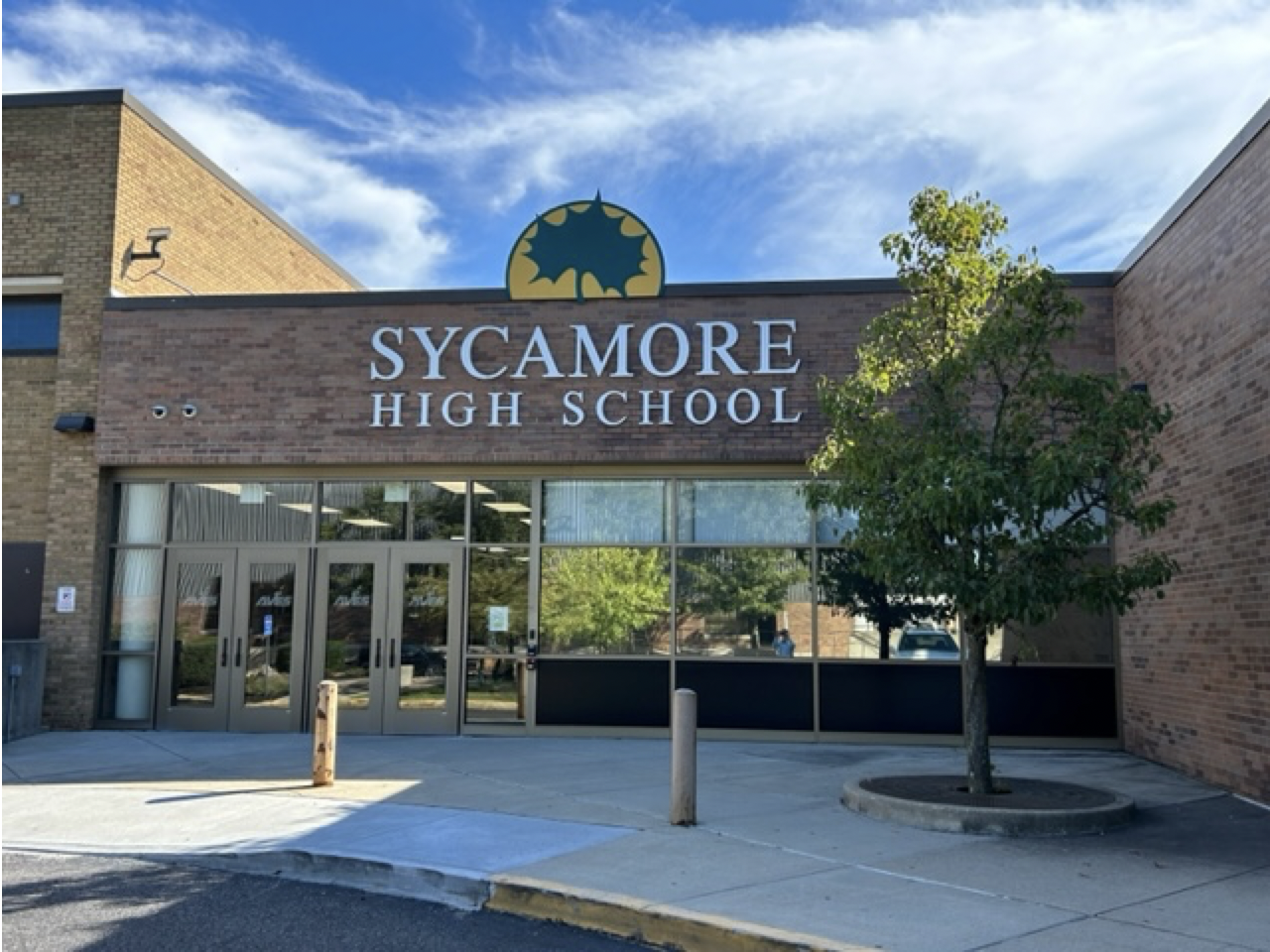
Sycamore High School Entrance

== Curriculum and academics ==
All students follow compulsory courses in English, maths, sciences, social studies, fine arts, and health and physical education. Elective subjects include business technology, computer science, family and consumer sciences, music and technology. Sycamore offers 42 accelerated and Advanced Placement courses. The school has a 99.1% graduation rate, and 90% of students go on to attend college.

Sycamore regularly has among the highest number of National Merit Scholars in Ohio. In 1999, Sycamore had a record 35 National Merit Scholars. That year, three students also scored perfect scores on the major college entrance examinations.

Sycamore has been highly placed in the National Science Bowl, and the Ohio Math League competition, and won the Ohio Council of Teachers of Mathematics competition in 2000, 2001, and 2007. Sycamore has been historically successful in science fairs; students compete at the University of Cincinnati Regional Science Fair and many go on to compete at the state science fair at the Ohio State University. In 2013, Sycamore won the "Harold C. Shaw Outstanding School Award" at the state science day. Only four schools in Ohio merited this honor.

== Clubs and activities ==
Sycamore offers over 50 clubs and other extra-curricular activities for students. Sycamore's Latin Club functions as a local chapter of both the Ohio Junior Classical League (OJCL) and National Junior Classical League (NJCL). Sycamore's DECA program is nationally recognized and has had several state and national competitors. The Sycamore robotics club competes in both the FIRST Robotics Competition and the FIRST Tech Challenge. The Sycamore Fencing Club is the oldest continuously run such high school club in Greater Cincinnati.

== Student publications ==
The Leaf is the official high school news magazine of Sycamore High School. After 60 years as a black-and-white newspaper, the 2013-14 editorial staff transformed the student-run newspaper into a magazine, with selective pages in color, and made The Leaf's online platform interactive. The magazine is in print and has grown to include graphics as well as articles.

The Log yearbook is distributed to all students in Sycamore High School.

Ink is an annual literary magazine published by members of the Creative Writing Club.

== Arts ==
The Sycamore Music Program has been nationally recognized as an Outstanding Music Education Program by the NAMM Foundation. The Sycamore High School Marching Band has achieved an OMEA Superior Rating and competes in three circuits: OMEA, Mid-States Band Association and Bands of America. In 2016, they attended MSBA Class 4A Championships, achieving 2nd place overall. In 2017, they attended the BOA Grand Nationals in Indianapolis, Indiana at Lucas Oil Stadium. The Sycamore High School Orchestra is an all-string orchestra and has scored highly in state competitions. The school stages regular productions in its auditorium, The Aves Theatre, as well as traveling to participate in OMEA performances and competitions.

== Athletics ==
Sycamore High School competes in the Greater Miami Conference (GMC), under the Ohio High School Athletic Association (OHSAA). The school participates in 22 GMC sports as well chess and academic quiz team. It also competes in 3 sports not offered by the GMC (Boys' & Girls' Water Polo, and Boys' Hockey). Collectively, as of 2017, Sycamore had won 143 total Team GMC Championships, which was the second most of any school in the conference. The school has developed a strong rivalry with William Mason High School from Mason, Ohio, prompting the spread of the slogan, "Go Aves, Beat Mason".

=== State championships ===
Sycamore High School has won 20 Team State Championships

- Boys Tennis- 2014, 2015, 2016, 2022, 2023, 2024
- Girls Lacrosse- 2007, 2009, 2014
- Boys Lacrosse- 2004
- Girls Water Polo- 1989, 1990, 1991, 1992, 1993
- Boys Water Polo- 1976, 1978, 1985
- Girls Swimming and Diving- 1992
- Baseball- 1948

The school has won 46 individual State Championships in events such as wrestling, track, tennis, diving, swimming, golf, and gymnastics.

== Notable faculty ==
- Peyton Ramsey

== Notable alumni ==
- Malar Balasubramanian, pediatrician
- Carson Foster, Olympic swimmer
- Jane French, musician
- Jeannine Hall Gailey, poet
- Darius Hillary, NFL cornerback
- Jason Matthew Smith, actor
- Dan Ketchum, Olympic swimmer
- Stewart Mandel, sportswriter
- Daniel Mason-Straus, mixed martial arts fighter
- Michael Matthews, National Football League (NFL) tight end
- Tricia McLaughlin, political spokeswoman
- Erin McPike, television news correspondent
- Sydney Morton, actor
- Justin Murray, NFL offensive tackle
- Mark P. Painter, jurist
- Sara Randolph, international soccer player
- Shefali Razdan Duggal, United States Ambassador to the Netherlands
- Scott Roberson, CIA Officer and police detective killed in Camp Chapman attack
- Kate Rockwell, actress
- Kenny Schoeni, Major League Soccer (MLS) goalkeeper
- Brandon Sosna, sports administrator and executive
- Glen Terry, NCAA champion hurdler
- Peter Tomsen, United States Special Envoy to Afghanistan, U.S. Ambassador to Armenia
- David Uible, local politician and businessman
- Kevin Youkilis, Major League Baseball (MLB) first baseman
