= William F. Brown (engineer) =

William F. Brown (29 November 1919, in Tampa, Florida – 6 September 2010, in Kennewick, Washington) was an American welding engineer, professional engineer and magnetic pulse welding expert.

== Life and career ==
Brown was born in Tampa, Florida and grew up in the Blue Ash and St. Bernard suburbs of Cincinnati, Ohio. He graduated in Sycamore Union High School in 1939, where he excelled academically as well as having success in basketball and football. In high school, he also learned to play the game of golf. He enjoyed the sport immensely, spending weekends and summers caddying at the Kenwood Country Club in Cincinnati. He had the privilege to caddy for Sammy Snead and other golf legends during his years at the golf club.

In 1937, Brown began working for Towsley Trucks, Inc., in the machine shop as a laborer. As he learned the skill of welding, he developed a passion for welding engineering and metallurgy. Due to his excellent work ethic, he was promoted to Superintendent in charge of the Metal and Welding Department. Towsley Trucks Inc. commended Bill for his honesty, integrity and his willingness to work under any and all conditions.

Brown attended Ohio State University from 1951 and graduated in 1955 with two major accomplishments: he obtained a Bachelor of Science Degree in Welding Engineering and got awarded a Professional Engineering License. Brown excelled in academics and earned many scholarships during his university years, e.g. the 1954–55 Welding Engineering scholarship of $150 was awarded to him by the American Welding Society. He worked in the engineering lab and taught welding theory part-time.

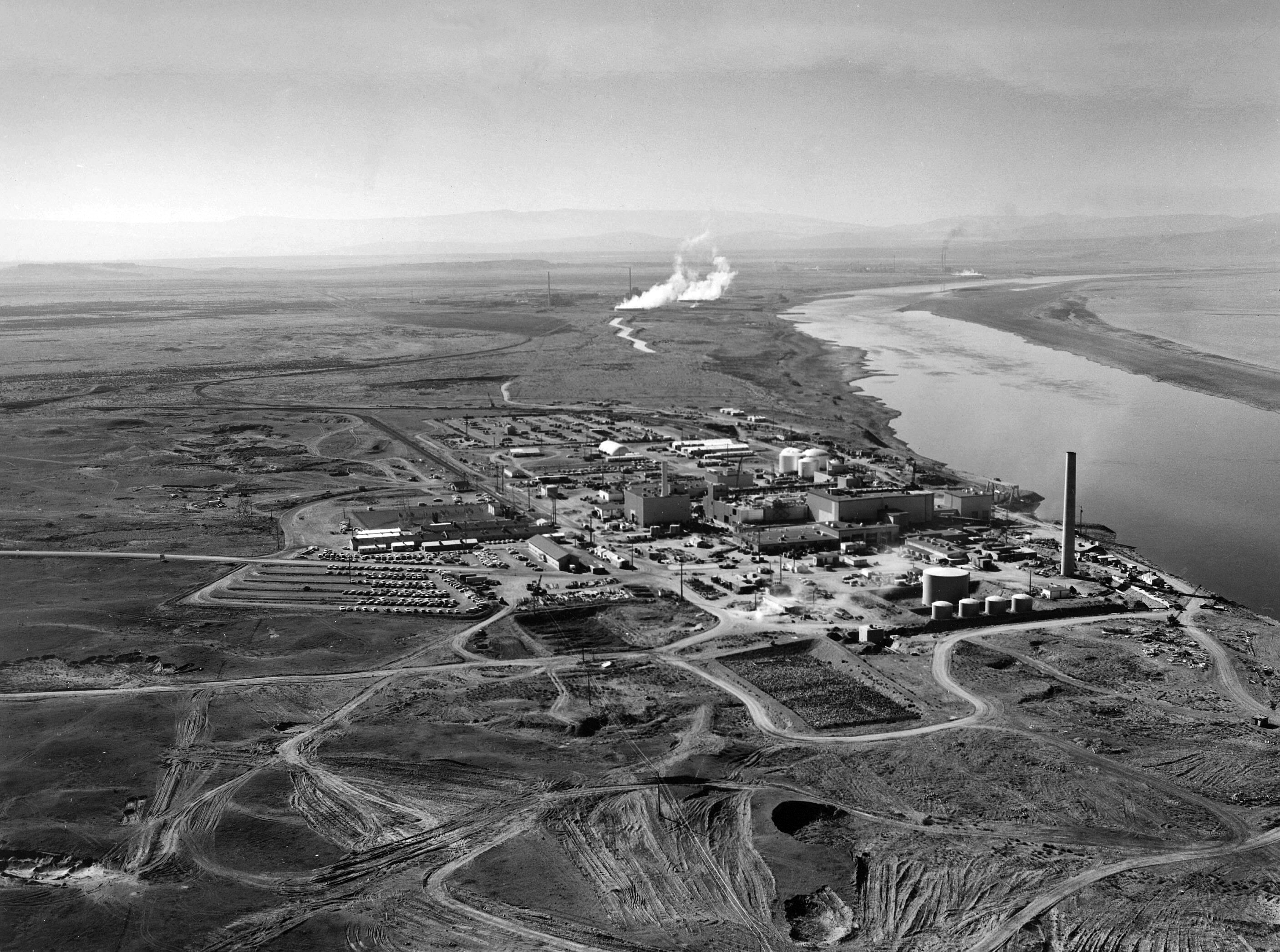
Nuclear reactors line the riverbank at the Hanford Site along the Columbia River in January 1960.

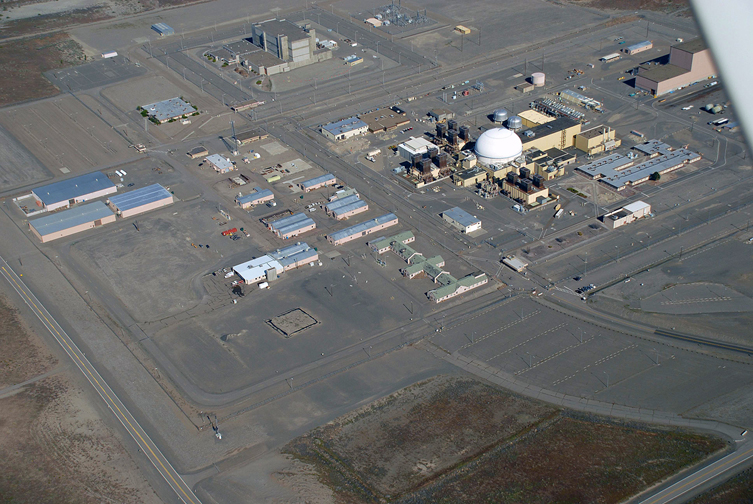
The Fast Flux Test Facility at Hanford Site, a 400 MW nuclear test reactor owned by the US Department of Energy.

After graduation, Brown worked for General Electric (GE) in Cincinnati, Ohio, until he transferred to GE Hanford, on the Columbia River in Richland, Washington, in 1961. When GE spun off Hanford, he went to work for Battelle Northwest and finally for Westinghouse Hanford, both in Richland, Washington. Brown was a Fellow Engineer working at Westinghouse when he retired in 1989.

At Westinghouse, he was responsible for the development of magnetic pulse welding machines. The magnetic pulse welding process was successful in producing welds within advanced stainless steel fuel pin rods for the Fast Flux Test Facility reactor. He later represented Westinghouse Hanford taking the magnetic pulse welding process to Japan, his last great accomplishment before retiring.

== Inventions ==
Throughout his career, Brown was granted many patents and was recognized for many technical accomplishments:

He co-invented a welding machine for automated closure of nuclear fuel pins by magnetic pulse welding, in which the open end of a length of cladding was positioned within a complementary tube surrounded by a magnetic pulse welding machine. Seals were provided at each end of the tube, which could be evacuated or receive tag gas for direct introduction to the cladding interior. Loading of magnetic rings and end caps was accomplished automatically in conjunction with the welding steps carried out within the tube.

He co-invented an automated loading system for nuclear fuel elements with a gravity feed conveyor, which permitted individual fuel pins to roll along a constrained path perpendicular to their respective lengths. The individual lengths of fuel cladding were directed onto movable transports, where they were aligned coaxially with the axes of associated handling equipment at appropriate production stations. The fuel pins were inserted as a batch prior to welding of end caps.

He co-invented an enlarged funnel, which was releasably mounted at the open end of a length of cladding by an encircling length of shrink tubing, which securely engages the outer surfaces of both the funnel and cladding. The shrink tubing overlapped an annular shoulder against which pulling force could be exerted to remove the tubing from the cladding. The shoulder could be provided on a separate collar or ring, or on the funnel itself.

He also co-invented an automated welding machine for the closure of nuclear fuel pins by gas tungsten arc welding (GTAW also known as TIG welding), in which a rotating length of cladding was positioned adjacent to a welding electrode in a sealed enclosure. An independently movable axial grinder was provided in the enclosure for refurbishing the used electrode between welds.

== Family ==
Brown married Mary Catherine Boring on 8 July 1944, whom he had met while they were both serving in the army during World War II, in which he was a welding instructor at the Aberdeen Proving Grounds in Maryland. In 1951, Bill and Mary moved to Columbus, Ohio and built up a family of five children.

== Societies ==
Brown was a member of the American Society for Metals the American Welding Society and the American Nuclear Society.

== Patents and publications ==
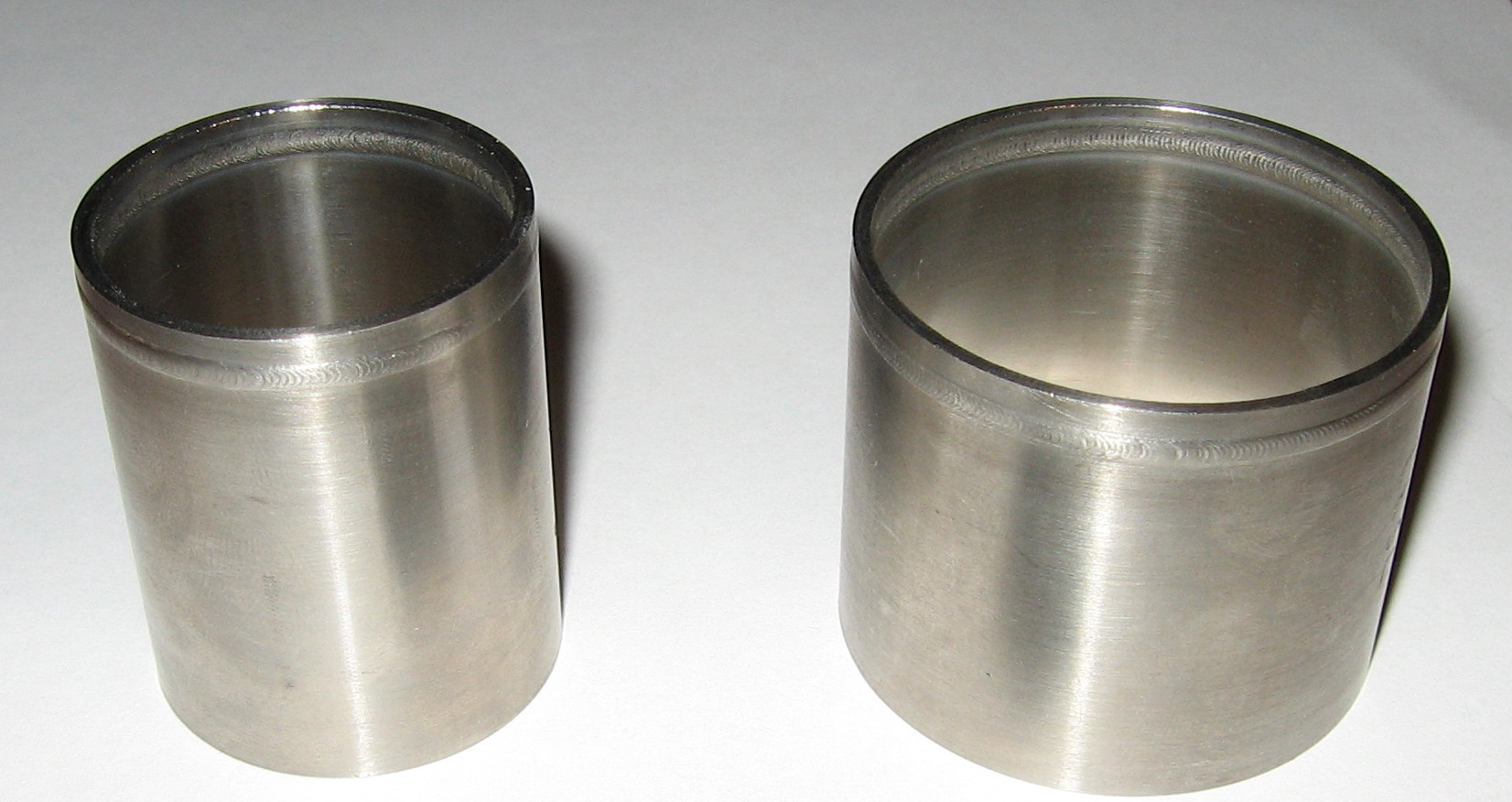
Automated circumferential gas tungsten arc welds (TIG welds) in stainless steel tubing (0.065" wall).

- David W. Christiansen and William F. Brown: 'Automated closure system for nuclear reactor fuel assemblies', Patent Number: 4542267, Filing Date: 30 November 1982.
- David W. Christiansen, William F. Brown and Jim M. Steffen: 'Automated fuel pin loading system.' Patent Number: 4548347, Filing Date: 30 November 1982.
- David W. Christiansen, Jim M. Steffen, William F. Brown: 'Funnel for fuel pin loading system.' Patent Number: 4537741, Filing Date: 30 November 1982.
- David W. Christiansen, William F. Brown: 'Gas tungsten arc welder with electrode grinder.' Patent Number: 4480171, Filing Date: 30 November 1982.

== References and further information ==
- Obituary: William F. Brown Sr. Tri-City Herald serving Kennewick, Richland and Pasco, 9 September 2010.
- Ralph Schäfer, Pablo Pasquale and Stephan Kallee:The Electromagnetic Pulse Technology (EMPT): Forming, Welding, Crimping and Cutting
- John McGinley: Electromagnetic Pulse Technology as a Means of Joining Generation IV Cladding Material, Proceedings of the 17th International Conference on Nuclear Engineering, ICONE17, 12–16 July 2009, Brussels, Belgium.
