= Sara Randolph =

American soccer player (born 1983)

Personal information
- Full name: Sara Renee Randolph
- Date of birth: February 27, 1983 (age 43)
- Place of birth: Denver, Colorado, U.S.
- Height: 5 ft 5 in (1.65 m)
- Position: Defender

Youth career
- Hurricane FC
- Hammer FC
- –2001: Sycamore Aviators

College career
Years	Team	Apps	(Gls)
2001–2004	North Carolina Tar Heels	98	(6)

International career
1999	United States U16		
2001	United States U19		
2001	United States	2	(0)

Sara Renee Randolph (born February 27, 1983) is an American former soccer player who played as a defender, making two appearances for the United States women's national team.

== Career ==
Randolph played youth soccer for Hurricane FC in Oklahoma, before joining Hammer FC in Cincinnati. She played for the Sycamore Aviators in high school, where she was an NSCAA All-American in 1999, and Parade High-School All-American in 2001. In college, she played for the North Carolina Tar Heels from 2001 to 2004, where she was a letter-winner and won the 2003 NCAA Division I Women's Soccer Tournament. She was a Soccer America First-Team All-American in 2001, as well as a Soccer Buzz Second-Team selection in the same year. She was included in the ACC All-Freshman Team and NCAA All-Tournament Team in 2001. In total, she scored 6 goals and recorded 15 assists in 98 appearances for the Tar Heels.

Randolph played for the U.S. under-16 national team in November 1999, as well as the under-19 team in 2001. She made her international debut for the United States on March 7, 2001 in a friendly match against Italy. She earned her second and final cap on March 13, 2001 in the 2001 Algarve Cup against Portugal.

== Personal life ==
Randolph was born in Denver, Colorado, though Cincinnati is her hometown.

== Career statistics ==
=== International ===
United States
Year	Apps	Goals
2001	2	0
Total	2	0

== Honors ==
North Carolina Tar Heels

- NCAA Division I women's soccer tournament: 2003
