= Blue Ash, Ohio =

- City
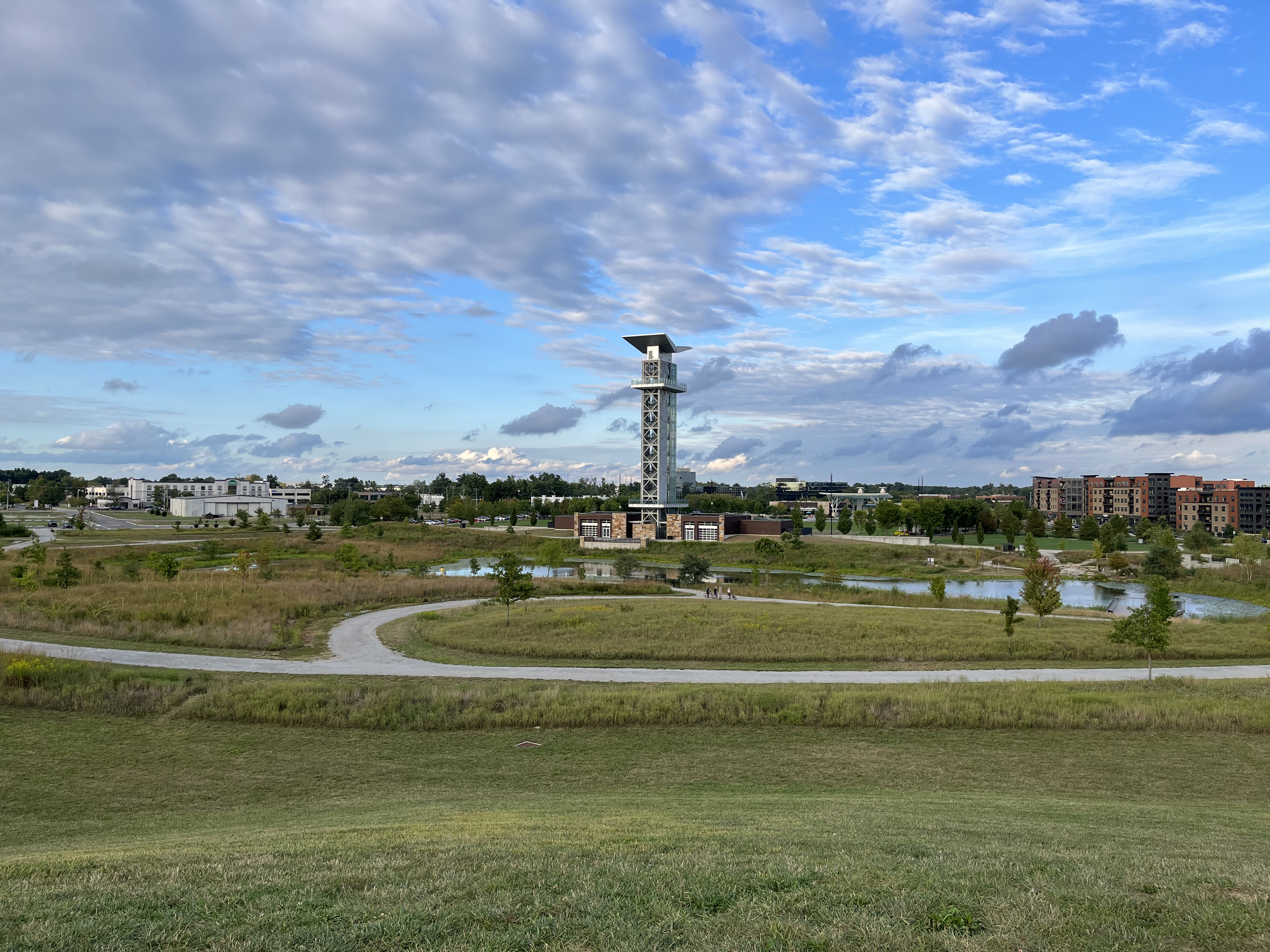
- Summit Park in 2023

- Flag Seal Logo
- Motto: Aspire; Achieve; Advance
- Interactive map of Blue Ash, Ohio
- Location within Ohio Location within the United States
- Coordinates: 39°14′50″N 84°22′34″W
- Country: United States
- State: Ohio
- County: Hamilton

Government
  - Mayor: Marc Sirkin

Area
  - Total: 7.60 sq mi (19.69 km^{2})
  - Land: 7.58 sq mi (19.64 km^{2})
  - Water: 0.019 sq mi (0.05 km^{2})
- Elevation: 810 ft (250 m)

Population (2020)
  - Total: 13,394
  - Estimate (2023): 13,408
  - Density: 1,766.1/sq mi (681.89/km^{2})
- Time zone: UTC-5 (Eastern (EST))
  - Summer (DST): UTC-4 (EDT)
- ZIP code: 45242
- Area code: 513
- FIPS code: 39-07300
- GNIS feature ID: 1086199
- Website: www.blueash.com

Blue Ash is a city in Hamilton County, Ohio, United States. An inner suburb of Cincinnati, the population was 13,394 at the 2020 census.

== History ==
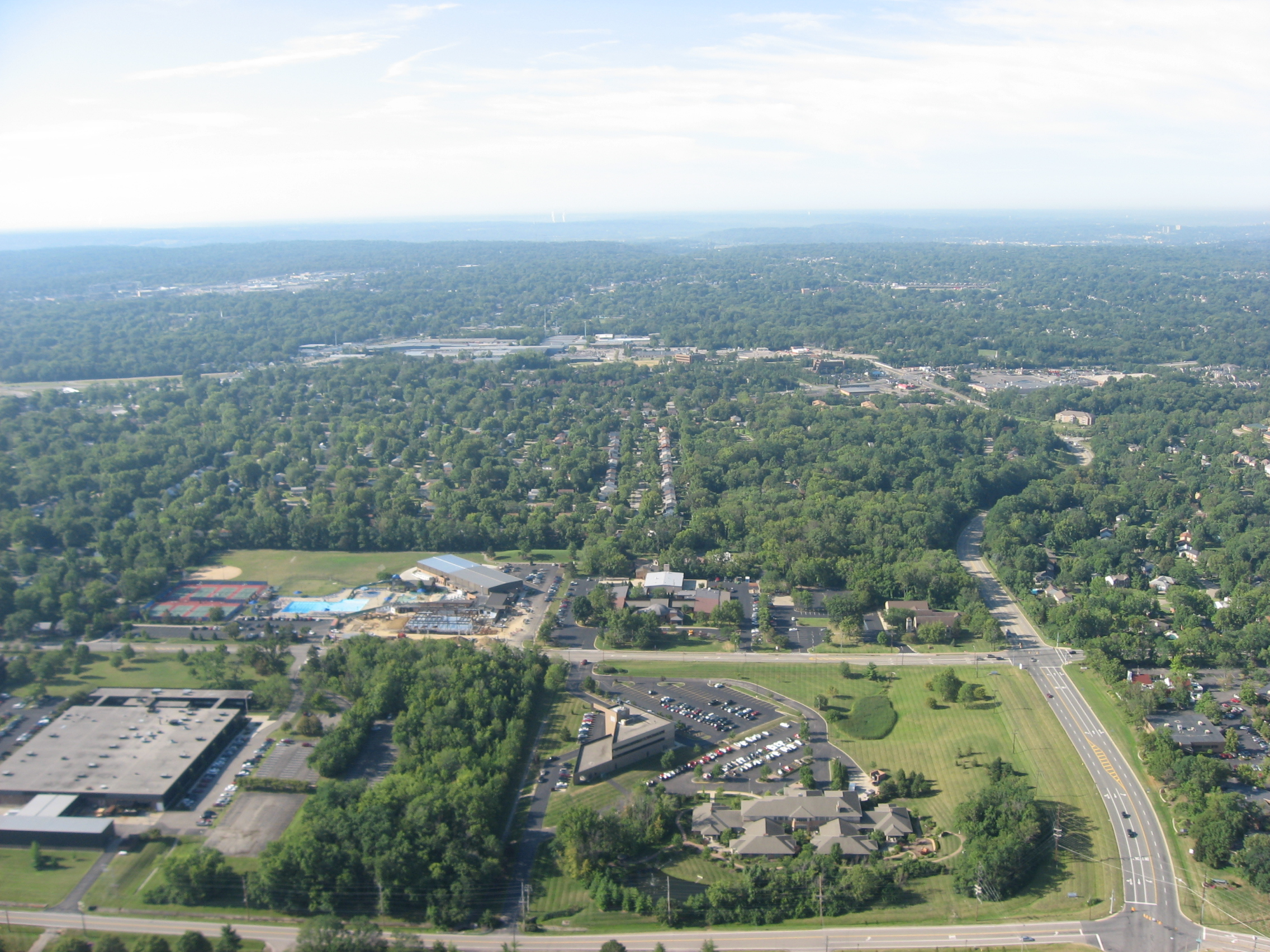
Offices and houses in southern Blue Ash in 2008

The area that is now Blue Ash was settled around 1791. In 1797, the first settlers built Carpenter's Run Baptist Church out of blue ash logs, giving the area its eventual name.

In the late 19th century, the Cincinnati, Lebanon and Northern Railway provided narrow-gauge commuter rail service to Blue Ash.

Blue Ash was the site of Cincinnati–Blue Ash Airport from 1921 to 2012. Originally a private airfield called Grisard Field, it was sold to the City of Cincinnati in 1946, becoming Ohio's first municipal airport. Cincinnati desired to expand the airport for major commercial service through the 1950s, but Blue Ash fought the city by incorporating first as a village in 1955 and then as a city in 1961. Eventually, through Reed Hartman's Community Improvement Corporation, Cincinnati developed the surrounding area as an industrial park and golf course. The airport closed on August 29, 2012, and the property was sold to the City of Blue Ash, which opened Summit Park on the property.

In 1998, the Southwest Ohio Regional Transit Authority proposed a MetroMoves light rail system with a Green Line that would initially run 19-mile (31 km) from Blue Ash to Covington, Kentucky. A future phase would have extended the line further north to Kings Island and south to the Cincinnati/Northern Kentucky International Airport. However, MetroMoves was rejected by Hamilton County voters.

On April 9, 1999, Blue Ash experienced an F4 tornado that caused four deaths.

== Geography ==
According to the 2010 census, the city has a total area of 7.59 square miles (19.7 km^{2}), of which 7.58 square miles (19.6 km^{2}) (or 99.87%) is land and 0.01 square miles (0.026 km^{2}) (or 0.13%) is water.

Blue Ash can be reached by Interstate 71 to the east, Interstate 275 to the north, and Ronald Reagan Cross County Highway to the south.

== Demographics ==
Historical population
Census	Pop.	Note	%±
1960	8,341		—
1970	8,324		−0.2%
1980	9,510		14.2%
1990	11,860		24.7%
2000	12,513		5.5%
2010	12,114		−3.2%
2020	13,394		10.6%
2023 (est.)	13,408		0.1%

=== 2020 census ===
As of the 2020 census, Blue Ash had a population of 13,394 and a population density of 1,766.09 per square mile (681.89/km^{2}). 100.0% of residents lived in urban areas, while 0% lived in rural areas.

There were 5,520 households in Blue Ash, of which 30.7% had children under the age of 18 living in them. Of all households, 52.8% were married-couple households, 16.2% were households with a male householder and no spouse or partner present, and 26.0% were households with a female householder and no spouse or partner present. About 27.0% of all households were made up of individuals and 11.1% had someone living alone who was 65 years of age or older.

There were 5,851 housing units, of which 5.7% were vacant. Among occupied housing units, 66.8% were owner-occupied and 33.2% were renter-occupied. The homeowner vacancy rate was 1.5% and the rental vacancy rate was 5.1%.

Racial composition as of the 2020 census
Race	Number	Percent
White	9,717	72.5%
Black or African American	890	6.6%
American Indian and Alaska Native	29	0.2%
Asian	1,770	13.2%
Native Hawaiian and Other Pacific Islander	2	<0.1%
Some other race	177	1.3%
Two or more races	809	6.0%
Hispanic or Latino (of any race)	507	3.8%

The median age was 40.1 years. 22.4% of residents were under the age of 18, 56.7% were 18 to 64, and 19.2% were 65 years of age or older. For every 100 females there were 95.2 males, and for every 100 females age 18 and over there were 92.8 males age 18 and over.

According to the U.S. Census American Community Survey, for the period 2016–2020 the estimated median annual income for a household in the city was $103,658, and the median income for a family was $117,010. About 4.8% of the population were living below the poverty line, including 5.2% of those under age 18 and 6.4% of those age 65 or over. About 65.0% of the population were employed, and 34.8% had a bachelor's degree or higher.

=== 2010 census ===
As of the census of 2010, there were 12,114 people, 5,015 households, and 3,404 families residing in the city. The population density was 1,598.2 inhabitants per square mile (617.1/km^{2}). There were 5,360 housing units at an average density of 707.1 per square mile (273.0/km^{2}). The racial makeup of the city was 79.9% White, 6.5% African American, 0.2% Native American, 10.6% Asian, 0.6% from other races, and 2.1% from two or more races. Hispanic or Latino of any race were 2.5% of the population.

There were 5,015 households, of which 31.1% had children under the age of 18 living with them, 53.7% were married couples living together, 10.4% had a female householder with no husband present, 3.8% had a male householder with no wife present, and 32.1% were non-families. 26.7% of all households were made up of individuals, and 10.3% had someone living alone who was 65 years of age or older. The average household size was 2.40 and the average family size was 2.91.

The median age in the city was 41.6 years. 22.7% of residents were under the age of 18; 6.6% were between the ages of 18 and 24; 24.8% were from 25 to 44; 30.6% were from 45 to 64; and 15.4% were 65 years of age or older. The gender makeup of the city was 49.0% male and 51.0% female.

=== 2000 census ===
As of the census of 2000, there were 12,513 people, 4,990 households, and 3,468 families residing in the city. The population density was 1,634.6 inhabitants per square mile (631.1/km^{2}). There were 5,251 housing units at an average density of 686.0 per square mile (264.9/km^{2}). The racial makeup of the city was 87.09% White, 5.01% African American, 0.25% Native American, 6.39% Asian, 0.02% Pacific Islander, 0.29% from other races, and 0.96% from two or more races. Hispanic or Latino of any race were 0.97% of the population.

There were 4,990 households, out of which 32.7% had children under the age of 18 living with them, 57.2% were married couples living together, 9.4% had a female householder with no husband present, and 30.5% were non-families. 25.3% of all households were made up of individuals, and 8.4% had someone living alone who was 65 years of age or older. The average household size was 2.48 and the average family size was 3.01.

In the city the population was spread out, with 25.4% under the age of 18, 6.4% from 18 to 24, 27.8% from 25 to 44, 26.1% from 45 to 64, and 14.2% who were 65 years of age or older. The median age was 39 years. For every 100 females, there were 93.7 males. For every 100 females age 18 and over, there were 91.0 males.

The median income for a household in the city was $81,591, and the median income for a family was $88,494. Males had a median income of $72,743 versus $65,060 for females. The per capita income for the city was $63,801. About 3.8% of families and 4.7% of the population were below the poverty line, including 6.8% of those under age 18 and 2.9% of those age 65 or over.

== Economy ==
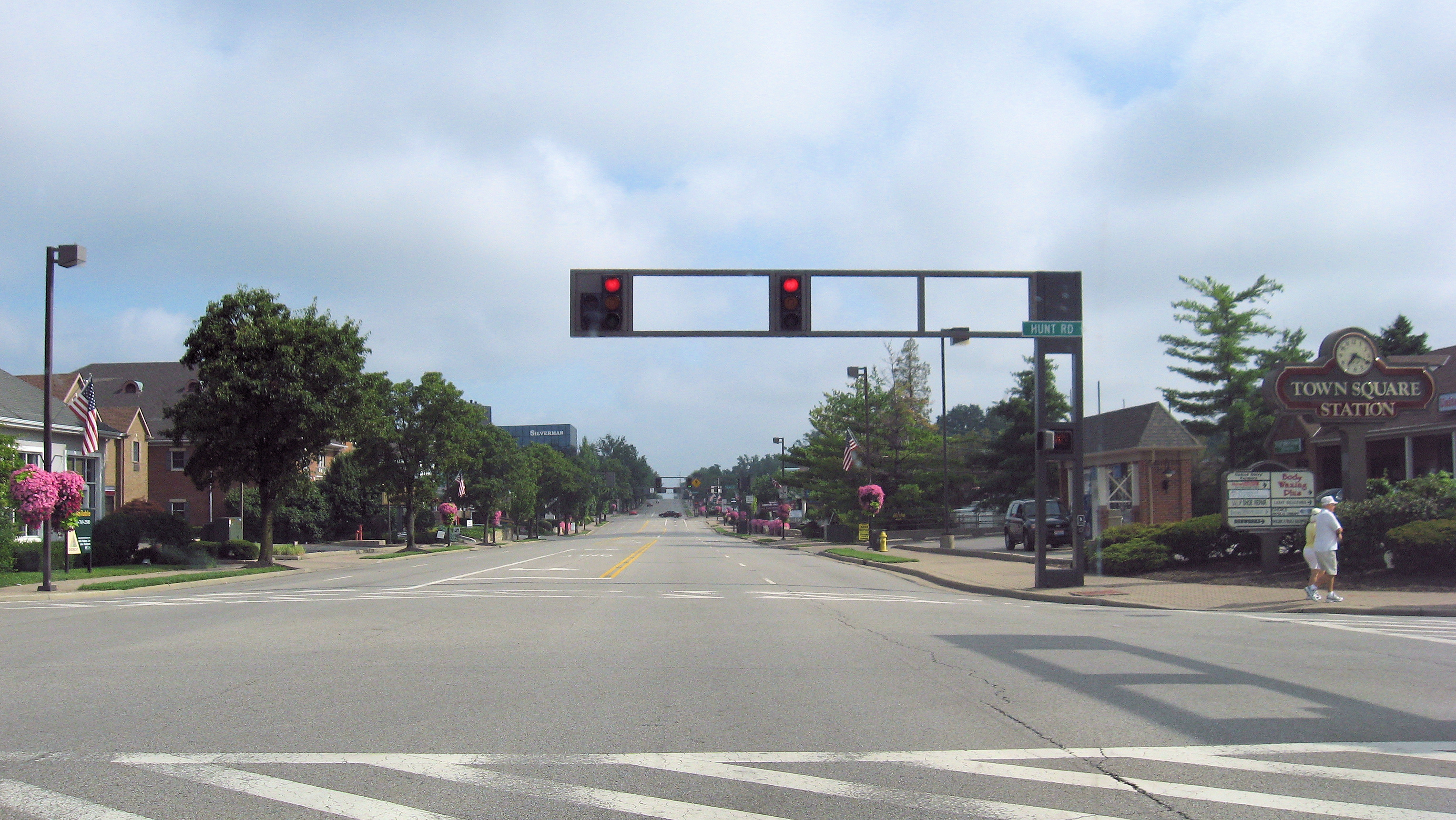
Downtown Blue Ash

Blue Ash's "daytime population" reaches approximately 55,000 due to the 2,000 businesses within the city limits. The city's industrial and commercial parks are home to many corporate headquarters, including:

- Belcan Corporation, an engineering consulting firm
- Citigroup (North American Information Technology Division)
- Ethicon Endo-Surgery, a medical device manufacturer
- F+W
- The J. Peterman Company, moved its headquarters to Blue Ash in 2011
- Milacron
- Sunny Delight Beverages, manufacturer of Sunny Delight
- Apollo Integrated Systems, high definition electronic frequency locking equipment designer
- Kroger Technology, headquartered and with two facilities in Blue Ash; the technology and computer system management division of the Kroger supermarket corporation, headquartered in nearby Cincinnati.

== Culture ==
Blue Ash offers two summer events each year: "Red, White, and Blue Ash"; and "Taste of Blue Ash". "Red, White and Blue Ash" is held annually in celebration of the 4th of July and features the biggest Independence Day firework display in the region. These events draw internationally popular headlining rock acts. On July 4, 2010, the bands Yes and Peter Frampton drew a record estimated 150,000 people to that year's Red, White, and Blue Ash event. Due to budget constraints the city decided to suspend their "Summerbration" event for 2010–2013, with hopes to resume the event in the near future.

Blue Ash and the neighboring city of Montgomery partner to support the Blue Ash Montgomery Symphony Orchestra, which performs at local events. In addition, the City provides an annual Concert Series each year during the summer months.

== Education ==
Blue Ash is mostly served by the Sycamore Community School District, which has had the most National Merit Scholars of any public school in Ohio for the past four years and has been given the highest rating of "Excellent" by the Ohio Department of Education for eight consecutive years. The Princeton City School District covers a western portion of the city. Moeller High School, located just outside the city limits, is a Catholic private high school for boys, while Ursuline Academy is a Catholic independent high school for girls. Blue Ash is also home to UC Blue Ash, formally called Raymond Walters College, a satellite campus of University of Cincinnati.

Blue Ash is served by a branch of the Public Library of Cincinnati and Hamilton County.

== Notable people ==
- William F. Brown, welding engineer
- Jeff Fultz, racing driver
- Joseph Crane Hartzell, Missionary Bishop of the Methodist Episcopal Church
- Stewart Mandel, college sports journalist
- Mark P. Painter, state appellate judge, United Nations appellate judge
- Amy Yasbeck, film and television actress, Wings

== Sister city ==
Blue Ash is a sister city of Ilmenau in Germany.
