= Sharon Wheatley =

American actress

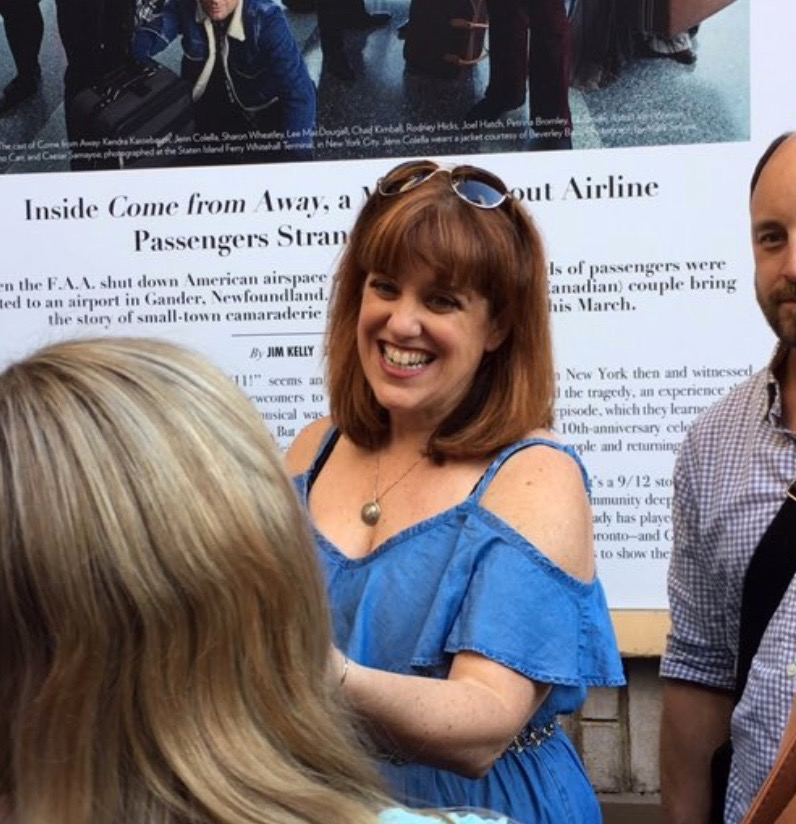
- Wheatley at the Come from Away stage door
- Born: December 7, 1967 (age 58); Cincinnati, Ohio
- Education: University of Cincinnati; Pace University (BFA)
- Occupations: Actress, singer, writer
- Spouse(s): Robert Meffe (married 1991–2016), Martha Donaldson-Wheatley (married 2017–present)
- Children: 2

Sharon Wheatley (born December 7, 1967) is an American actress, singer, and writer known for her work on the Broadway stage and in the New York theatre scene. She performed in the Tony Award winning Broadway musical Come from Away throughout its entire Broadway run as Diane, a friendly Texan who finds love when the transcontinental flight she is aboard is suddenly diverted to Gander, Newfoundland, due to the events of September 11, 2001. Wheatley had been with the production since its first professional production at the La Jolla Playhouse in the spring of 2015.

Wheatley published her first memoir, 'Til the Fat Girl Sings: From an Overweight Nobody to a Broadway Somebody, in 2006, to positive reviews from outlets such as the Wall Street Journal, Good Morning America, and BroadwayWorld. In 2022, Wheatley published her second novel, Drive: Stories From Somewhere in the Middle of Nowhere.

== Early life ==
A Cincinnati, Ohio native, Wheatley graduated from Ursuline Academy in 1985, and in 2015 was inducted into Ursuline's Performing Arts Hall of Fame. Following her high school graduation, Wheatley was accepted into the renowned Musical Theatre program at the University of Cincinnati's College-Conservatory of Music (CCM). She completed CCM's musical theatre program in 1990. During her four years at CCM she studied voice with famed Barbara Honn, who helped her develop a heathy and versatile singing technique. In 2007, Wheatley was honored with CCM's Young Alumnae Award, which "is given in recognition of excellence in Musical Theatre or a related field by an alum of the Musical Theatre program at CCM in the past two decades." Wheatley obtained her BFA in 2012 by attending classes at Pace University, where she won numerous writing awards.

Wheatley credits her passion for performing to Quisisana Resort in Maine, where she spent several summers working as a performer. She is still a regular guest and mentor to the young performers there.

Wheatley moved to New York City in 1991 following a cross country tour with The Sound of Music, and worked side jobs for a while before landing her first Equity job with the national tour of Les Miserables in late 1992.

As a writer, Wheatley started early, writing a book about healthy living while still in high school. However, she quickly realized Broadway was her main goal—not being an author at the age of 17—so she abandoned writing until 2004 when a casual conversation in a dressing room ended up sparking an entire novel, and making writing a major part of her career.

== Career ==
Sharon Wheatley made her Broadway debut as a swing in 1994, in the original Broadway production of Les Miserables directed by Trevor Nunn and John Caird. Before joining the Broadway company of Les Misérables, Wheatley traveled nationally as part of the touring company where she was a member of the ensemble and understudied the roles of both Eponine and Cosette.

Additional credits include:

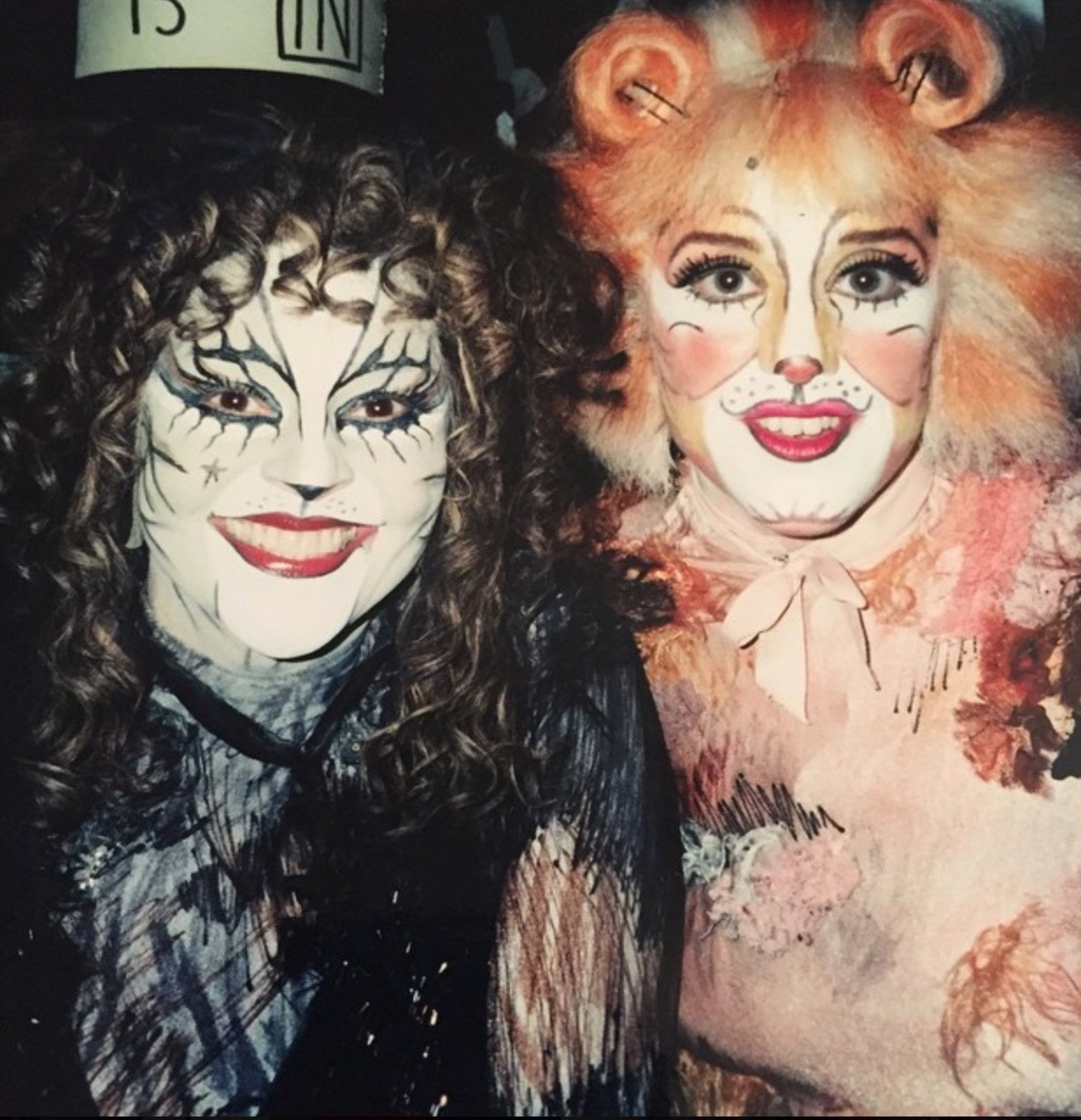
Linda Balgord and Sharon Wheatley in Cats

=== Broadway ===
- The Phantom of the Opera – Madam Firmin/Vacation Swing (2000-2005)
- Cats** – Jennyannydots (2000)
- Avenue Q** – Kate/Lucy, Mrs. T/Yellow Bear Standby (2007)
- Come from Away*** – Diane & Others (2016)

*Original Broadway cast
**Closing company

Wheatley holds the distinction of being the only actress to appear in Les Miserables, The Phantom of the Opera and Cats on Broadway. She also originated Avenue Q at The Wynn Casino and Resort in Las Vegas as Kate/Lucy/Mrs. T/Yellow Bear. On Broadway with Avenue Q, Wheatley served not only as a standby but also as the assistant stage manager and dance captain for part of her time with the production.

In July 2018, Wheatley returned to the role of Kate/Lucy for two performances only to celebrate the 15th anniversary of Avenue Q in New York City.

=== Tours ===
- The Sound of Music – Baroness Elberfeld
- Les Miserables – Eponine/Cosette swing
- The Phantom of the Opera – Madam Firmin
- Come from Away (pre-Broadway opening) – Diane and others

=== Regional ===
- Fiddler on the Roof – Yente
- A Funny Thing Happened on the Way to the Forum – Domina
- The Full Monty – Vicki
- Big River – Miss Watson

Wheatley has performed the majority of her regional credits at The Weston Playhouse in Weston, Vermont. Outside of her work at Weston, other notable credits include playing the Baker's Wife (Into the Woods) and Rosabella (The Most Happy Fella) at the Lyric Opera Cleveland in Ohio.

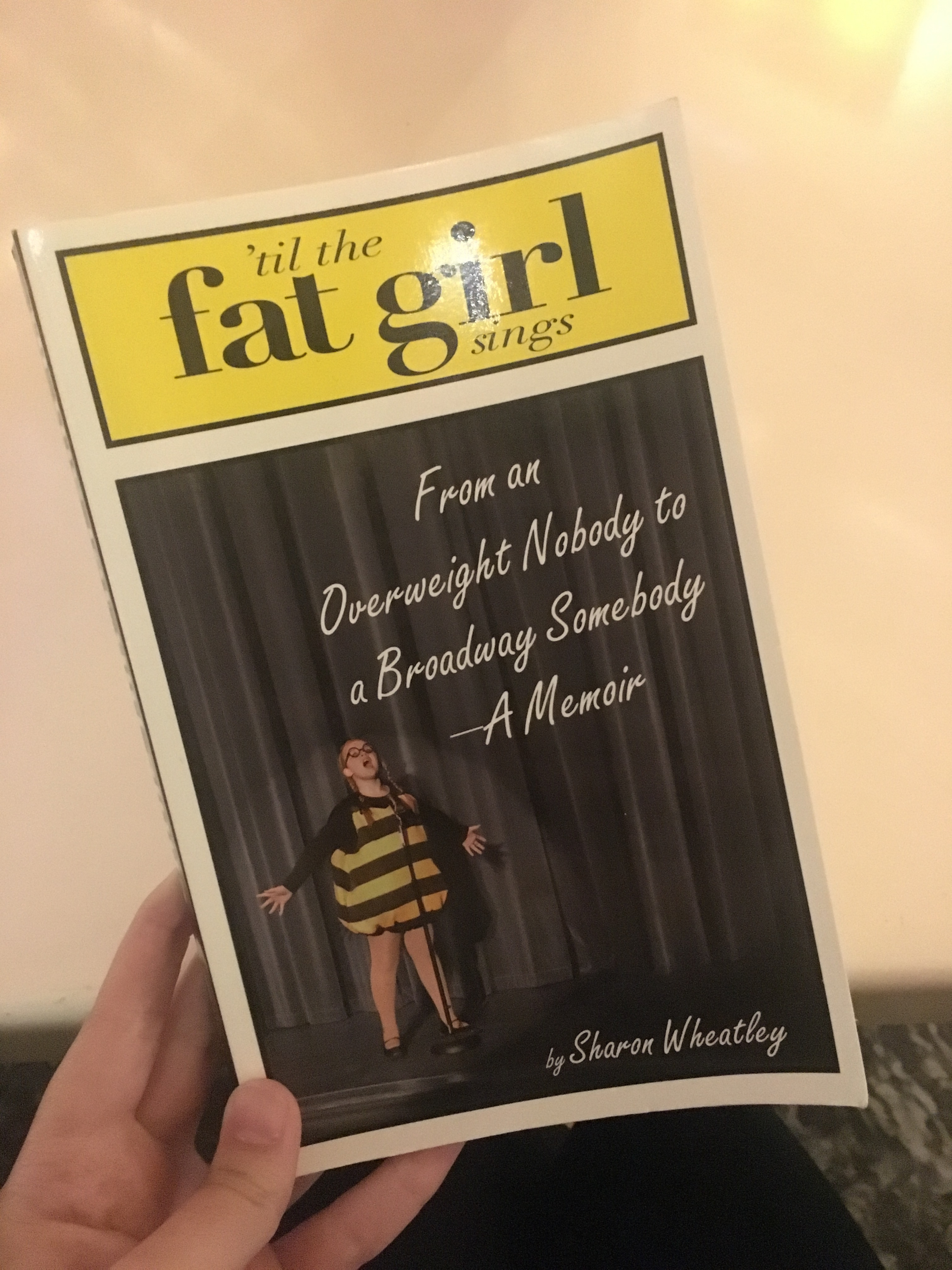
'Til the Fat Girl Sings, written by Sharon Wheatley

=== Writing ===
- 'Til the Fat Girl Sings: From an Overweight Nobody to a Broadway Somebody
- Drive: Stories from Somewhere in the Middle of Nowhere
- My Own Space, personal website and blog
- Avenue Zoo (Bronx Zoo stage show)
- Performance material for various artists

Wheatley's autobiography, 'Til the Fat Girl Sings (Adams Media), came out on June 1, 2006, and Wheatley followed its release with a year of public appearances and book-launch concerts. The writing of her memoir led to sketch comedy writing for Kristin Chenoweth, writing an award winning skit for the Gypsy of the Year Awards in 2017 with her Come from Away castmates, writing nationally for Weight Watchers from 2011-2015, and blogging on her own website, My Own Space. As a blogger, Wheatley is probably best known for Smash—Fact or Fiction?, a blog/quiz that follows every episode of NBC's Smash (which was created by her close friend and mentor Theresa Rebeck). Smash—Fact or Fiction? was written up in New York Magazine on two occasions and was featured in Marie Claire Magazine. She published her second book, Drive, in 2022. The book chronicles her time during the pandemic as she and her wife took an RV from Ohio to California to drop her child off for summer.

=== Concert soloist ===
Wheatley has performed as a solo vocalist with a number of pops orchestras, as part of touring programs of the hits of the 1950s and holiday music, with conductors Jack Everly, Stuart Chaftez and Charles Prince. She has sung with such orchestras as Detroit, New Jersey, Oklahoma City, Jacksonville, Milwaukee, Omaha, and Seattle.

== Personal life ==
Wheatley was previously married to Robert Meffe, a conductor and music professor. The couple met while studying at University of Cincinnati and began dating while working at Quisisana. They had two children together.

Wheatley married Broadway stage manager Martha Donaldson in 2017, whom she met in 2015, during the debut run of Come from Away.

== Awards and nominations ==
| Year | Award | Category | Work | Result |
|---|---|---|---|---|
| 2015 | Craig Noel Awards | Outstanding Ensemble | Come from Away (La Jolla Production) | Won |
| 2017 | Helen Hayes Awards | Outstanding Ensemble in a Musical—HAYES Production | Come from Away | Won |
| 2017 | Chita Rivera Awards for Dance and Choreography | Outstanding Ensemble in a Broadway Show | Come from Away | Nominated |
