= Erin McPike =

American writer

- Born: Erin Kathleen McPike; June 28, 1983 (age 43); Cincinnati, Ohio, U.S.
- Education: American University
- Years active: 2006–present
- Known for: Current, White House Correspondent for Independent Journal Review; Former, Correspondent for CNN; Former, Reporter for RealClearPolitics; Former, Reporter, NBC News; Former, Reporter and Writer, National Journal

Erin Kathleen McPike (born June 28, 1983) is a public relations executive for Facebook. She started her career as a political consultant and journalist. She has worked for CNN, NBC News, National Journal, and RealClearPolitics.

== Early life and education ==
She was born on June 28, 1983, in Cincinnati, Ohio, the daughter of Richard and Amy McPike (née, Burrill), where she graduated from Sycamore High School in 2001. McPike obtained her baccalaureate with honors from American University in Washington, D.C. in 2005, majoring in political science and journalism.

== Career ==
She started her journalism career at National Journal, where she was a writer, and moved on to NBC News, being a reporter for the network. McPike went back to National Journal, where she served as their political reporter. Her next position was national political reporter for RealClearPolitics, before going on to CNN as a correspondent for the channel. She later worked on the press team for former Starbucks CEO Howard Schultz as he explored an independent presidential campaign.
