= Luis Maria Simón =

Uruguayan jurist

Luis Maria Simón is a judge of the United Nations Appeals Tribunal. He is a native of Uruguay.

Simón is a legal scholar who has written widely on Latin American law.
