= David Uible =

American rancher and investor (born 1960)

David H. Uible
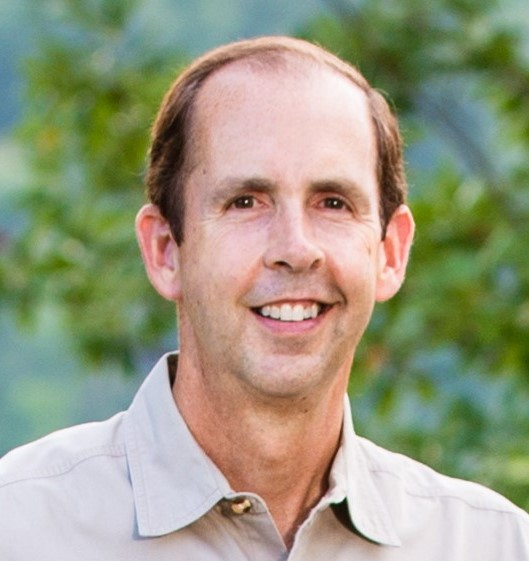
- Born: December 14, 1960 (age 64)
- Occupation(s): Entrepreneur, investor, rancher
- Known for: Election Fraud, Chairman of Clermont County Republican Party, County Commissioner

David H. Uible, (born December 14, 1960) is an investor, serial entrepreneur, and former Republican Party Chairman and County Commissioner.

== Early life and education ==
Uible was born and raised in Cincinnati, Ohio, the youngest of nine children of Richard and Verna Uible. After graduating from Sycamore High School he went on to Purdue University in West Lafayette, Indiana where he graduated in 1983 with a B.S. in Mechanical Engineering. Uible also did graduate work at Xavier University and graduated from the Executive Management Program at the University of Cincinnati.

== Personal life ==
In 1985, Uible married Cindy Cassell, a college classmate from Purdue University. They have a child. The Uible family lives on the 171-acre (69 ha) Vista Grand Ranch of New Richmond, Ohio where they raise American Buffalo for their USDA meat label.

== Career ==
Uible's first position in the international division of a computer software company led to starting his first company, Rosegate Technology Group, in 1989 to sell reconditioned computer equipment to Swiss banks. In 1993, Uible privatized the medical publishing division of the Russian Ministry of Health (former USSR). This initiative opened advertising opportunities for western pharmaceuticals, and sales grew from $0 to $6 million before the company was nationalized by the Russian government in May 1996.

Uible got involved in the software industry in 1994 when he and his friend Steve Schulz, who was working for Rosegate Technology Group at the time, acquired a zoning permit software program from a local developer. Rebranded as ZonePro, the software was designed to help smaller government communities keep track of their zoning and building permitting data, fee collections and inspection processes. Schulz continued to develop and expand ZonePro with his own company, ZP Systems, until 2019, when he sold it to iWorQ Systems.

In 1995, Uible co-founded the Cincinnati Chapter of Young Entrepreneurs Organization (now known as Entrepreneurs' Organization). He also served as the Chapter's President.

After his experience in Russia, Uible sought a new business venture, confident in his ability to build and grow companies. In 1997, he purchased Structured Network Solutions, a voice and data cabling company that was on the brink of bankruptcy. Over the next three years, he expanded the company significantly by securing subcontracting work with Cincinnati Bell. Just weeks before the dot-com crash in March 2000, he sold the business to the publicly traded company Black Box (http://www.blackbox.com).

From 2002 to 2024, Uible owned Wellex Manufacturing Inc. and Southern Ohio Manufacturing Corp., two companies specializing in manufacturing steel components for the industrial valve and machine tool industries. After more than two decades of ownership, he sold both businesses to a local investor.

In 2004, Uible founded American Home Warranty LLC, a specialized warranty product for residential property inspectors. The company experienced both prosperous years and lean periods during the housing crisis and Great Recession from 2007-2009. After 15 years in operation, he sold the business in 2019.

From 2006 to 2009, Uible and his wife, Cindy, owned Bistro Joe, a restaurant in their hometown of New Richmond that featured dishes made from their bison meat products. Polly Campbell, the food editor from the Cincinnati Enquirer, reviewed the restaurant and awarded it three stars. On many Thursday and Friday nights, Bistro Joe showcased local jazz talent, including singer Julie Stinchcomb and pianist/trumpeter Chris Smith.

Uible has been a member of the Clermont County Planning Commission, the Northern Kentucky University School of Entrepreneurship, the Southern Ohio Agricultural Community Development Fund, the University Club of Cincinnati, and the Cincinnati Youth Collaborative.

Uible has been a Director of the New Richmond National Bank, Treasurer of the Clermont County Republican Central and Executive Committees, and Advisory Judge of Purdue University Center of Entrepreneurship.

Uible was a board member on the Investment Advisory Committee for Clermont County, which managed about $100,000,000 in municipal and corporate bonds and U.S. Treasury investments.

From May 2014 thru May 2018 Uible was elected and served as Party Chairman of the Clermont County Republican Party.

== Board of Clermont County Commissioners ==
After a county commissioner seat was vacated in March 2012, Uible was appointed to the Board of Clermont County Commissioners with 67% of the Clermont County Republican Central Committee vote on March 14, 2012, from a field of ten candidates seeking the appointment. Uible went on to win the general election in November 2012 defeating his Democratic opponent, Len Harding, 67.54% to 32.46. With endorsements from Senator Portman, Governor Kasich, and Representative Wenstrup, Uible was reelected for a second term in November 2014 after winning 74.34% of the vote over his Democratic opponent Richard Perry.

== Controversies ==
In 2017, Uible lobbied to have the professional soccer team FC Cincinnati build their $30M practice complex in Clermont County. The effort was orchestrated by Uible through the Clermont County Convention and Visitor's Bureau (CVB). In August 2018 the Clermont County Board of County Commissioners approved a 1% lodging tax designed to bring the new soccer facility to Clermont County. In September 2018 FC Cincinnati began building their new complex in Milford, Ohio. Officials said they expect to get $2 back for every $1 they spend. Formerly, Uible served as both a Clermont County commissioner and as a member of the county's visitors bureau. The Ohio Attorney General issued an opinion that said that service on a county convention and visitors bureau by a county commissioner was a conflict of interest. Uible had left the visitors bureau prior to the opinion being issued.

In 2019 Uible pleaded guilty to tampering with records, a misdemeanor offense, as it related to his candidate petition. The former Clermont County Commissioner was sentenced to a 90-day probation and fined $250.

Uible ran in the Republican Primary in 2020 for the Ohio Senate District 14 seat against Terry Johnson. Uible received the endorsement from the Clermont County Republican Party, however the State Republican Senate Caucus campaign for Johnson. Two weeks before the election a state Republican central committee member filed for an investigation accusing Uible of forging the Republican voter guide, which resulted in newspaper stories and media headlines. The Clermont County prosecutor refused to prosecute Uible, however the State Attorney General got a grand jury to indicted Uible on charges including forgery, fraud, falsification and tampering. The case was tried before Clermont County Common Pleas Judge McBride who wrote in his decision on December 8, 2021 that the State of Ohio failed to show where any of the alleged crimes took place, one critical element that must be established beyond a reasonable doubt for any conviction. Because the venue requirement was never met the court would not address the charges of tampering with evidence and falsification. Additionally, Judge McBride stated that the State presented insufficient evidence that Uible committed forgery, since the voter guide Uible was accused of printing was downloaded from the Republican Party's website where the Party encourage its members to copy and share it with colleagues, family members and friends. Regarding the fraud charge, Judge McBride wrote that there was no evidence that Uible caused some detriment to another and he certainly received no financial gain. In conclusion, Judge McBride acquitted Uible of all ten charges in the indictment.
