= Ursuline Academy (Cincinnati, Ohio) =

Location
- 5535 Pfeiffer Road; Blue Ash (Cincinnati), (Hamilton County), Ohio 45242; United States; 39°14′53″N 84°22′16″W

Information
- School type: Private, All-Girls Independent all-girls Catholic high school
- Motto: We learn not for school but for life.
- Religious affiliation: Roman Catholic
- Denomination: Roman Catholic
- Patron saint: St. Angela Merici
- Established: 1896
- Founder: Ursulines of Brown County
- CEEB code: 361125
- President: Patricia Norton Boehm '94
- Principal: Molly Proudfit
- Teaching staff: 60
- Grades: 9–12
- Gender: Female
- Average class size: 18-25
- Student to teacher ratio: 12:1
- Colors: Green and Gold
- Slogan: Voice. Values. Vision.
- Athletics conference: Girls Greater Cincinnati League
- Mascot: Lions
- Accreditation: North Central Association of Colleges and Schools
- Newspaper: The Lion's Roar
- Yearbook: Paw Prints
- Tuition: $17,850
- Affiliation: Ursulines
- Literary Magazine: Chalkdust
- Website: www.ursulineacademy.org

Ursuline Academy is a four-year college-preparatory independent girls' Catholic high school in Blue Ash, Ohio, United States. As of 2017, 658 students from all over Greater Cincinnati are enrolled in the school, representing 50 different ZIP codes.

== History ==
Ursuline Academy was founded in 1896 by the Ursuline sisters of Brown County, who also founded St. Ursula Academy and Chatfield College.

== Academics ==
Ursuline offers a curriculum of over 100 courses specifically designed to prepare the student for the demands of college level programs. A modular schedule (see below) is enhanced by the open-area structure which provides flexible learning areas. Twenty-six different co-curricular activities are available to students including 13 different sports at various levels.

The tuition for 2024-2025 is $17,160. Tuition does not include fees for Kairos and Graduation. Each class level has certain fees such as retreat fees, special class equipment fees, etc.

=== Modular schedule ===
During the 1970s, Ursuline switched to a modular schedule. This consists of 6 days (lettered A-F) each with 18 modules. Each mod is 20 min, with a 3 min passing time between each one added in 2004. Classes range from 2-4 modules long. Students say that the schedule works very well in helping them with time management and responsibility.

Each also has a certain number of free mods each day to eat, study, do homework, work in the library, or socialize. As the choice of classes becomes more open to each student, free mods become more abundant. A typical student would have between 21 and 40 free mods a cycle, depending on the number of classes taken.

Different schedule days are set up so that mods can be shortened, (to incorporate time for a pep rally, department meeting, etc.) but are never skipped.

== Athletics ==
Ursuline Academy is a member of the GGCL

=== Ohio High School Athletic Association State Championships ===
- Girls Tennis - 1994
- Girls Tennis - Doubles 2012
- Girls Tennis - Singles 2011
- Girls Volleyball - 1975, 1993, 2002, 2009, 2012, 2017, 2018, 2022
- Girls Swimming and Diving – 1991, 1998, 2000, 2001, 2002, 2013, 2014
- Girls Golf – 1999

=== Other athletic accomplishments ===
- Golf State Runner-up 1992, 1998, 2003
- Swimming and Diving State Runner-up 1992, 1994, 1995, 1996, 1999, 2003, 2004, 2005, 2006, 2007, 2008, 2011, 2012
- Volleyball State Runner-up 1995, 2001, 2003, 2008
- Volleyball National Runner Up 2009
- Tennis State Runner-up 2000, 2011
- Field Hockey Final Four State - 1998, 2001, 2012, 2018
- Cross Country State Qualifier - 2003, 2013, 2017 *State Runner Up

== Notable alumnae ==
- Marguerite Clark (1899) - Silent film actress
- Theresa Rebeck (1976) - Playwright, novelist and screenwriter
- Amy Yasbeck (1980) - Actress and widow of actor John Ritter
- Linda Vester (1983) - Former news anchor at NBC and Fox News
- Sharon Wheatley (1985) - Broadway actress and writer
- Erin Phenix (1999) - 2000 Olympics - Swimming gold medalist Women's 4x100 Freestyle Relay
