= Sycamore Community School District =

School district in Ohio, United States

Address
- 5959 Hagewa Drive Blue Ash, Ohio, 45242; United States

District information
- Type: Public
- Grades: PK–12
- Superintendent: Chad Lewis
- Schools: 7
- NCES District ID: 3904486

Students and staff
- Students: 6,051 (2025–2026)
- Teachers: 364.80 (on an FTE basis) (2025–2026)
- Staff: 874.49 (on an FTE basis) (2025–2026)
- Student–teacher ratio: 16.59 (2025–2026)

Other information
- Website: www.sycamoreschools.org

Sycamore Community School District is a school district in southwestern Ohio, United States, mainly in Hamilton County and the Greater Cincinnati area. It is commonly referred to as "Sycamore Community Schools". The district includes the communities of Blue Ash, Montgomery, Symmes Township, and some parts of Sycamore Township.

The four elementary schools are for students kindergarten to fourth grade: Blue Ash Elementary, Maple Dale Elementary, Montgomery Elementary, and Symmes Elementary. Edwin H. Greene Intermediate (E.H. Greene) is the following intermediate school that contains students grades five and six. Sycamore Junior High (SJH) is for students grades seven and eight. Sycamore High School (SHS) is for students grades nine to twelve.

== Schools ==
- High School
  - Sycamore High School
- Intermediate Schools
  - Sycamore Junior High School
  - Edwin H. Greene Intermediate School
- Elementary Schools
  - Blue Ash Elementary School
  - Maple Dale Elementary School
  - Montgomery Elementary School
  - Symmes Elementary School

== See also ==
- List of school districts in Ohio
