= Montgomery, Ohio =

- City
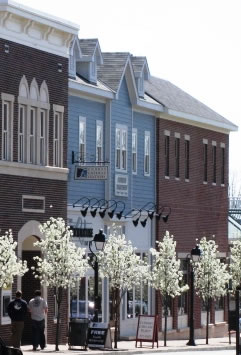
- Downtown

- Flag Seal Logo
- Interactive map of Montgomery, Ohio
- Location within Ohio Location within the United States
- Coordinates: 39°15′20″N 84°20′28″W
- Country: United States
- State: Ohio
- County: Hamilton

Government
  - Mayor: Lee Ann Bissmeyer

Area
  - Total: 5.32 sq mi (13.78 km^{2})
  - Land: 5.31 sq mi (13.75 km^{2})
  - Water: 0.012 sq mi (0.03 km^{2})
- Elevation: 794 ft (242 m)

Population (2020)
  - Total: 10,853
  - Estimate (2022): 10,773
  - Density: 2,045.0/sq mi (789.58/km^{2})
- Time zone: UTC-5 (Eastern (EST))
  - Summer (DST): UTC-4 (EDT)
- ZIP code: 45242
- Area code: 513
- FIPS code: 39-51716
- GNIS feature ID: 2395380
- Website: www.montgomeryohio.gov

Montgomery is a city in Hamilton County, Ohio, United States. It is an eastern suburb of Cincinnati. The population was 10,853 at the 2020 census.

== History ==
Settled in 1795, Montgomery is one of the oldest settlements in Hamilton County. A log cabin was the first tavern of the community; this was a resting place for teamsters and travelers on the main road. In 1802, Nathaniel Terwilliger laid out the town. In 1806 and 1807 a number of people from Montgomery, New York, settled around this point for trade and farming, and named the village for their former home.

Montgomery incorporated as a village in 1910. The village became a coach stop on the Cincinnati–Zanesville Road, later known as the Montgomery Pike, with an inn, two taverns, a grist mill and a carding mill to process its agricultural products. It remained a small community until the 1960s when it became a bedroom community for people working in Cincinnati. In 1971, it was reincorporated as a city. Originally confined to the Sycamore Township limits, Montgomery began annexing land in neighboring Symmes Township in 1973. On January 1, 1986, Montgomery withdrew from Symmes Township by forming a paper township named Montgomery Township. On January 1, 1990, Montgomery also withdrew from Sycamore Township by making this paper township coextensive with the city.

During the COVID-19 pandemic Montgomery held a "reverse parade", setting up floats in Sycamore High School's parking lot and having residents drive by. The event made international news.

== Geography ==
According to the United States Census Bureau, the city has a total area of 5.30 square miles (13.73 km^{2}), of which 5.29 square miles (13.70 km^{2}) is land and 0.01 square miles (0.03 km^{2}) is water.

== Demographics ==
Historical population
Census	Pop.	Note	%±
1920	378		—
1930	394		4.2%
1940	461		17.0%
1950	579		25.6%
1960	3,075		431.1%
1970	5,683		84.8%
1980	10,084		77.4%
1990	9,753		−3.3%
2000	10,163		4.2%
2010	10,251		0.9%
2020	10,853		5.9%
2022 (est.)	10,773		−0.7%

=== 2020 census ===
As of the 2020 census, there were 10,853 people living in the city, for a population density of 2,045.03 people per square mile (789.58/km^{2}). The median age was 45.7 years; 25.1% of residents were under the age of 18 and 23.6% were 65 years of age or older. For every 100 females there were 94.5 males, and for every 100 females age 18 and over there were 90.5 males age 18 and over.

There were 3,911 households in Montgomery, of which 35.5% had children under the age of 18 living in them. Of all households, 71.2% were married-couple households, 8.7% were households with a male householder and no spouse or partner present, and 18.4% were households with a female householder and no spouse or partner present. About 19.3% of all households were made up of individuals and 12.8% had someone living alone who was 65 years of age or older.

There were 4,102 housing units, of which 4.7% were vacant. The homeowner vacancy rate was 1.8% and the rental vacancy rate was 5.4%.

As of the 2020 census, 100.0% of residents lived in urban areas, while 0.0% lived in rural areas.

According to the U.S. Census American Community Survey, for the period 2016-2020 the estimated median annual income for a household in the city was $131,856, and the median income for a family was $165,000. About 1.5% of the population were living below the poverty line, including 0.6% of those under age 18 and 4.5% of those age 65 or over. About 62.5% of the population were employed, and 77.2% had a bachelor's degree or higher.

Racial composition as of the 2020 census
Race	Number	Percent
White	9,183	84.6%
Black or African American	293	2.7%
American Indian and Alaska Native	6	0.1%
Asian	719	6.6%
Native Hawaiian and Other Pacific Islander	1	0.0%
Some other race	73	0.7%
Two or more races	578	5.3%
Hispanic or Latino (of any race)	339	3.1%

=== 2010 census ===
As of the census of 2010, there were 10,251 people, 3,849 households, and 2,940 families living in the city. The population density was 1,937.8 inhabitants per square mile (748.2/km^{2}). There were 4,055 housing units at an average density of 766.5 per square mile (295.9/km^{2}). The racial makeup of the city was 89.9% White, 2.7% African American, 0.1% Native American, 5.6% Asian, 0.4% from other races, and 1.4% from two or more races. Hispanic or Latino of any race were 1.8% of the population.

There were 3,849 households, of which 34.8% had children under the age of 18 living with them, 68.5% were married couples living together, 5.9% had a female householder with no husband present, 1.9% had a male householder with no wife present, and 23.6% were non-families. 21.2% of all households were made up of individuals, and 12.6% had someone living alone who was 65 years of age or older. The average household size was 2.60 and the average family size was 3.04.

The median age in the city was 46.9 years. 25.3% of residents were under the age of 18; 4.8% were between the ages of 18 and 24; 16.7% were from 25 to 44; 33.3% were from 45 to 64; and 19.9% were 65 years of age or older. The gender makeup of the city was 48.1% male and 51.9% female.

=== 2000 census ===
As of the census of 2000, there were 10,163 people, 3,616 households, and 2,943 families living in the city. The population density was 1,908.7 inhabitants per square mile (737.0/km^{2}). There were 3,716 housing units at an average density of 697.9 per square mile (269.5/km^{2}). The racial makeup of the city was 94.00% White, 1.57% African American, 0.05% Native American, 3.26% Asian, 0.10% from other races, and 1.02% from two or more races. Hispanic or Latino of any race were 0.77% of the population.

There were 3,616 households, out of which 39.0% had children under the age of 18 living with them, 74.8% were married couples living together, 4.8% had a female householder with no husband present, and 18.6% were non-families. 16.7% of all households were made up of individuals, and 8.6% had someone living alone who was 65 years of age or older. The average household size was 2.75 and the average family size was 3.11.

In the city, the population was spread out, with 28.1% under the age of 18, 4.1% from 18 to 24, 22.1% from 25 to 44, 30.1% from 45 to 64, and 15.5% who were 65 years of age or older. The median age was 43 years. For every 100 females, there were 93.4 males. For every 100 females age 18 and over, there were 88.1 males.

The median income for a household in the city was $89,224, and the median income for a family was $100,158. Males had a median income of $78,881 versus $45,000 for females. The per capita income for the city was $45,460. About 2.0% of families and 2.8% of the population were below the poverty line, including 3.2% of those under age 18 and 1.2% of those age 65 or over.

== Education ==
Montgomery is served by the Sycamore Community School District which has received the highest rating from the state of Ohio for ten consecutive years. Sycamore Community School District also serves Blue Ash, Ohio and Symmes Township, Hamilton County, Ohio. The city is also served by the private schools of Moeller High School for boys and Ursuline Academy for girls. Montgomery lies within the Great Oaks joint vocational school district.

== Notable people ==
- Jane French, singer and songwriter
- Rose Lavelle, USWNT Soccer Player
- Tricia McLaughlin, political spokesperson
- Paul O'Neill, Major League Baseball player
- Connie Pillich, Ohio state representative
- Daniel von Bargen, actor
- John B. Weller, governor of California
- Harland Whitmore, economist

== Sister cities ==
Montgomery has one sister city, as designated by the Sister Cities International:

- - Neuilly-Plaisance, Île-de-France, France
