= Dubey =

Dubey or Dwivedi or Duvedi or Dave or Duve or Dube is a Hindu Brahmin surname of Northern India. It refers to experts of the Yajurveda. In Southern India, it is referred to as Dwivedula. It may also refer to Dubé - a surname among some people of French and other European origins.

== Notable people ==
Notable people with this name include:

- Abhay Kumar Dubey
- Amrapali Dubey
- Bindeshwari Dubey
- Bodhram Dubey
- Chandra Shekhar Dubey
- Chandrashekhar Dubey
- Dushyant Dubey
- Harsh Dubey
- Ira Dubey
- Jitender P. Dubey
- Lillete Dubey
- Lushin Dubey
- Muchkund Dubey
- Neha Dubey
- Nishikant Dubey
- Pradeep Dubey
- Praveen Dubey
- Prem Ram Dubey
- Rajkumari Dubey
- Ravi Dubey
- Rambola Dubey
- Satyadev Dubey
- Satyajeet Dubey
- Satyendra Dubey
- Saurabh Dubey - several people
- Shar Dubey
- Shivam Dubey
- Shubham Dubey
- Sourav Dubey
- Surendra Dubey
- Tulsidas
- Vijay Kumar Dubey
- Vikas Dubey
- Yash Dubey

== See also ==
- Indian names
- Dubey & Schaldenbrand
- Dwivedi
