= Dubé =

Dubé and Dube may refer to:

- Dube (surname)
- Dubé, Ethiopia, the major town in Doba
- Dube, South Africa, a suburb of Soweto
- Dube Jillo (born 1970), Ethiopian long-distance runner
- The Dube, a percussion instrument invented by Dion Dublin, English TV presenter and former footballer
- z Dubé, Czech variant of of Dubá (e.g. in noble family name Berka of Dubá)

== See also ==
- Georges Duby (1919-1996), a French historian of the Middle Ages
- Dubey and Dwivedi, the Indian variants of Dube
