= Rigvedi =

Rigvedi (also called Rugvedi) is an Indian surname used by the Deshastha Rigvedi Brahmin (DRB) community, meaning versed in Rigveda. It is one of the two major sub-sects among Deshastha Brahmins. Similarly there are Yajurvedi (lit. one who knows Yajurveda).

== Geographical distribution ==
As of 2014, 90.32% of all known bearers of the surname Rigvedi were residents of India. The frequency of the surname was higher than national average in the following states:

1. Maharashtra
2. Karnataka

== See also ==
- Yajurvedi
- Dwivedi
- Trivedi
- Upreti
- Chaturvedi
