= Yajurvedi =

Yajurvedi is an Indian surname used by Yajurvedi Brahmins, meaning versed in Yajurveda. It is one of the two major sub-sects among Deshastha Brahmins. Similarly there are Rigvedi (one who knows Rigveda).

== See also ==
- Rigvedi
- Dwivedi
- Trivedi
- Chaturvedi
