= Jackpot (2009 film) =

- Poster of the film
- Directed by: Kaushik Ganguly
- Produced by: Srikant Mohota, Mahendra Soni
- Starring: Hiran; Koel; Rahul; Sohini
- Music by: Jeet Gannguli
- Production company: Shree Venkatesh Films
- Release date: 23 January 2009
- Running time: 120 minutes
- Country: India
- Language: Bengali
- Budget: ₹ 8.5 million
- Box office: ₹ 4.7 million

Jackpot (Bengali: জ্যাকপট) is a 2009 Bengali film directed by Kaushik Ganguly. The film stars Hiran, Koel, Rahul, and Sohini. It was Paul's second film after her debut in Bow Barracks Forever.

== Plot ==
The film is about a reality show organized by Star Ananda, where the two finalists, Arka from the hills and Dodo from Sundarbans Sajnekhali, are given two tasks to fulfill. Dodo is given the duty of a police constable at Bhawanipur police station while Arka is given the duty of a driver. They have three days and two nights to battle it out and win the prize of Rs. 1 crore. The one who makes fewer mistakes wins the jackpot.

Anchor Suman Dey becomes the host, a runaway from a mental hospital. Mayhem begins when Piu's older sister and brother-in-law report to the Bhawanipur police station (where Dodo and Mithu are posted) and Arka learns of Piu's problems. As Arka and Dodo are in disguise, they use fake names to cover up their identity. Arka becomes Jackie and Dodo becomes Potla. Thus while Arka flees to the hills with Piu to fulfill his job and win the money, Dodo with Goldar and Mithu start chasing them, not knowing that Piu is actually with Arka. After much hue and fuss Arka manages to take Piu to her lost love (she was escaping only to find her lost love, Abhirup) and Dodo catches up with them.

Arka and Dodo are crowned champions. Arka donates the entire Rs. 50 lakh for Piu's medical expenses. Dodo donates his share of Rs. 50 lakh for the same noble cause. It is revealed that Dodo and Arka are best friends and Dodo had persuaded Arka to participate in the show. Mithu and Dodo become love birds, while Arka devotes his concentration to the orphaned, lonely and mentally stagnated Piu.

== Cast ==
- Hiran as Arka
- Koel as Piu
- Rahul as Dodo
- Sohini as Mithu
- Biswajit Chakraborty as Police Inspector
- Dev in a special dance appearance for the remake of the song "Jibone Ki Pabona"

== Soundtrack ==
Jackpot

Soundtrack album by Jeet Gannguli
- Released: 2009
- Recorded: 2008
- Studio: Shree Venkatesh Films
- Genre: Feature film soundtrack
- Language: Bengali
- Label: SVF
- Producers: Srikant Mohota, Mahendra Soni

Jeet Gannguli chronology
Saat Paake Bandha (2009)	Jackpot (2009)	Challenge (2009)

Singles from Jackpot

The song "Jibone Ki Pabona" was a remix of the original song written by Sudhin Dasgupta and sung by Manna Dey.

All music is composed by Jeet Gannguli.

No.	Title	Singer(s)	Length
1.	"Jibone Ki Pabona"	Shaan	3:48
2.	"Celebrity"	Jojo	3:09
3.	"Bhola Jaay Na"	Nachiketa Chakraborty	6:12
4.	"Aari Aari"	Shreya Ghoshal	3:59
5.	"Ajke Haat Bariye"		4:21
6.	"Ami Chanchala He"		4:27
7.	"Kalke Chilam Jajabar"		3:53
8.	"Prithibi Onek Boro"		5:46

== See also ==
- Waarish
- Ek Mutho Chhabi
