= Dobay =

Dobai or Dobay may refer to:

== Hungarian surname ==
- Ştefan Dobay (1909–1994), Hungarian-Romanian footballer
- Karol Dobay (1928–1982), Slovak football striker
- Gyula Dobay (1937–2007), Hungarian swimmer
- Dobay family (Hungarian: Kisdobai Dobay család), Hungarian nobility

== See also ==
- Dwivedi or Dobay, Dube; an Indian Brahmin surname
