= Trivedi =

Trivedi is a family name from northern and western India reflecting the mastery over the Sama Veda(including the Vedic Branch he was born into). In Sanskrit Trivedi means 'one that knows the Sama Veda’, from tri = 'three' + veda ‘sacred knowledge' leading to vedi = 'to see'. They are also known as Tripathi and Tiwari in some parts of north India.

== Origin of surname ==
Though the common assumption is that Trivedi means 'one who knows three vedas', oral Hindu tradition has an alternative explanation. In Sanskrit, Tri = 'three' and Vedi = 'to see'. Therefore, a Trivedi is one with 'three-fold vision', or someone who is able to see into the past, present, and future. The spiritual connotation is that a Trivedi is a master of time and can see into the past and future. The more practical explanation is that a Trivedi is a master Historian; one who is well-versed in History and can best guide the public for decisions that will impact the future.

There is no limit to the number of vedas an individual can learn, therefore there is no reason why a Dwivedi or Trivedi could not learn all four vedas. But, it is more about the expertise of only three vedas and not all four. People used to spend their whole life to learn and practice vedas.

== Geographical distribution ==
Trivedi is an Indian Brahmin surname. Within India, Trivedi surname will most commonly be discovered in Uttar Pradesh, Bihar, Gujarat, and Maharashtra. In ancient India, there was much mobility of Brahmins through vast regions depending on where their expertise was needed. At that time, most people in India spoke Sanskrit, so a Trivedi could easily move around between regions with no language barrier. As the languages evolved from Sanskrit into the local languages of modern times, a Trivedi that resided in a particular region adapted that language.

As of 2014, there are approximately 112,129 people in the world with surname Trivedi. Of those, approximately 88.6% of all known bearers of the surname Trivedi were residents of India. The following Indian states have the greatest number of individuals with surname Trivedi (with population in parentheses):

- 1. Uttar Pradesh (37,140)
- 2. Maharashtra (23,695)
- 3. Gujarat (13,670)
- 4. Bihar (6,442)
- 5. Delhi (2,876)
- 6. Rajasthan (2,351)
- 7. Jharkhand (1,983)
- 8. West Bengal (1,520)
- 9. Madhya Pradesh (1,508)
- 10. Karnataka (717)

== Notable people ==
- Ami Trivedi, Indian television and theatre artist
- Amit Trivedi, Indian film composer, musician, singer and lyricist, working in Bollywood
- Ankit Trivedi, Indian Gujarati language writer and poet
- Arvind Trivedi, Indian actor
- Aseem Trivedi, anti-corruption cartoonist
- Bhoomi Trivedi, Indian singer
- Chandulal Madhavlal Trivedi, KCSI, Kt., CIE, OBE, ICS (1893–1981), Indian administrator and civil servant
- Darshan Ashwin Trivedi, Indian film director
- Dinesh Trivedi (born 1950), Indian politician from BJP
- Ira Trivedi, Indian novelist, yogini, entrepreneur, speaker and globe trotter
- Kranti Trivedi, one of the most prolific Hindi language writers of the past century
- Lina Trivedi, co-creator of (Beanie Babies)
- Manan Trivedi (born 1974), physician, Iraq War veteran
- Ram Krishna Trivedi (1921–2015), former Governor of Gujarat who served from 1986 to 1990 (nephew of Ram Pal Trivedi)
- Sandip Trivedi, Indian theoretical physicist working at Tata Institute for Fundamental Research (TIFR) at Mumbai, India
- Siddharth Trivedi (born 1982), Indian cricketer who represents Gujarat
- Suchita Trivedi (born 1976), Indian film and television actress
- Sudhanshu Trivedi (born 1970), BJP National Spokesperson and Member of Parliament (Rajyasabha)
- Uttamlal Trivedi, Indian Gujarati language writer
- Y. P. Trivedi, Indian Politician
- Bela M. Trivedi, Judge, Supreme Court of India
- Kamal Trivedi, Advocate General of Gujarat

== Related surnames ==
- Subedi, meaning Versed in veda
- Dwivedi, meaning versed in two vedas
- Chaturvedi, meaning versed in four vedas
