= Kranti (disambiguation) =

Kranti may refer to:

- Kranti, 1981 Indian film
- Kranti (2002 film)
- Kranti (2006 film)
- Kranti (2023 film)
- Kranti (community development block), a community development block in Jalpaiguri district, West Bengal
  - Kranti Assembly constituency, former Assembly constituency
- Kranti Trivedi, Indian writer
- Kranti Kanade, Indian filmmaker
- Kranti Redkar, Indian actress
