= Shambhu Nath Chaturvedi =

Indian politician

Member of Parliament, Lok Sabha
- In office 1962 & 1977 – 1967&1980
- Preceded by: [Brijraj Singh[Achal Singh]]
- Succeeded by: Nihal Singh
- Constituency: Agra

Personal details
- Born: 3 February 1908 Holipura Village, Agra District
- Party: Janata Party
- Other political affiliations: Bharatiya Lok Dal; Indian National Congress (O); Indian National Congress
- Education: M. A. (Allahabad University)

Shambhu Nath Chaturvedi was an Indian politician and was the member of 3rd and 6th Lok Sabha. He started his political career in 1952 when he was elected to Uttar Pradesh Legislative Assembly. In 1960 he was elected as First Mayor of Agra Municipal Corporation .
