= The Perfect Husband =

The Perfect Husband may refer to:

- The Perfect Husband (2003 film), an Indian romantic comedy film
- The Perfect Husband (2014 film), an Italian horror film
- The Perfect Husband: The Laci Peterson Story, a 2004 American television film
