= Anita Majumdar =

Canadian actress and playwright

- Born: 22nd November; Port Moody, British Columbia, Canada
- Occupations: Actress, Playwright, Dancer
- Known for: Acting in Murder Unveiled
- Website: https://www.anitamajumdar.com/

Anita Majumdar is a Canadian actress and playwright. She is best known for her role in the CBC television film Murder Unveiled, for which she received the Best Actress award at the 2005 Asian Festival of First Films. Her acting credits include film, television, and theatre.

== Personal life ==
The daughter of Bengali immigrants from India, Majumdar grew up in Port Moody, Canada. She did not speak English until the age of six. She is trained in several forms of classical dance, including Bharata Natyam, Kathak and Odissi. Majumdar graduated from the University of British Columbia where she earned degrees in English, Theatre and South Asian Languages. In 2004, she graduated from the National Theatre School of Canada.

== Career ==
She first came to attention with her one-woman play Fish Eyes in which she played three different parts. She was cast as Davinder Samra in the CBC television film Murder Unveiled. In the film she plays a fictionalised version of Jaswinder Kaur Sidhu, a Canadian Sikh beautician who was murdered by her family after she secretly married a poor Indian rickshaw driver. She won the Best Actress Award at the 2005 Asian Festival of First Films for her performance in the film. She then wrote a one-woman play based on the film called The Misfit.

Majumdar was cast as Alia in Diverted (2009), a passenger whose plane is one of 39 international flights diverted to Gander International Airport, Newfoundland, Canada, as a result of the September 11 attacks. While waiting days for her flight to New York City to be allowed to resume, she falls in love with a local air traffic control manager, played by Shawn Ashmore.

She also plays the character of Emerald in Deepa Mehta's adaptation of Midnight's Children. The film was shown at various Film festivals and was a nominee for Best Picture and seven other categories at the 1st Canadian Screen Awards, winning two awards.

There has been essays written about her work. Signatures of the Past, for example, consists of a series of case studies that examine the intersections of cultural identity and cultural memory in Canadian and American drama. The essays explore a range of dramatic manifestations of contested and complex cultural memories.

The Fish Eyes. Trilogy premiered at the Cultch, Vancouver, on January 31, 2015. Its first part Fish Eyes was presented for the first time at the André Pagé Studio at the National Theatre School of Canada in January 2004 and was directed by Kate Schlemmer. It officially premiered at Theatre Passe Muraille, Toronto, in October 2005 with Anita Majumdar, as its choreographer and actor, and Gregory David Prest as its director and dramaturg. Boys with Cars—its second part—was commissioned and developed by Night swimming, under the patronage and directing of Brian Quirt. Its third part—Let Me Borrow That Top—was co-commissioned by Night swimming and The Banff Centre. The national tour of the trilogy included the Great Canadian Theatre Company in Ottawa, where I saw it in 2014, the Push International Performing Festival (Vancouver), the Aga Khan Museum (Toronto), the Belfry Theatre (Victoria), and The Banff Centre.

Her most socially impactful work included Fish Eyes. It's three coming-of-age solo shows that follow the lives of teenage girls who attend the same high school and process their real-life dilemmas through dance, while exploring the heartaches of youth and the meaning of heritage. Her series Fish Eyes. is also being used for Audition Speeches for Black, South Asian and Middle Eastern Actors Monologues for Women.

== Work ==
=== Film and television ===
- 1998 - Principal Takes a Holiday - Student
- 2005 - Murder Unveiled - Davinder Samra
- 2009 - Diverted - Alia Ramaswami
- 2011 - Republic of Doyle - Episode: "The Son Also Rises" - Michelle Richmond
- 2012 - Midnight's Children - Emerald
- 2012 - Gavin Crawford's Wild West - Liz

=== Stage ===
- 2004 - Tales from Ovid
- 2005 - Fish Eyes
- 2006 - Bloom
- 2006 - Bombay Black
- 2008 - The Misfit
- 2009 - Aisha n' Ben
- 2009 - Shakuntala
- 2010 - Oy! Just Beat It!
- 2010 - Ali & Ali: The Deportation Hearings
- 2011 - Rice Boy
- 2014 - Same Same But Different
- 2019 - A Thousand Splendid Suns
