= Will Randall (writer) =

British travel writer

Will Randall (born 1966) is an English travel writer and language lecturer.

== Biography ==
Educated in London, he taught languages in the English west country for ten years, including 5 years at Blundell's School, before moving to live in the South Pacific islands. He is best known for his book Solomon Time. After teaching at The Skinners' School since 2016, he has recently started work at an English school in Algiers.

His 2003 book Indian Summer is about time he spent teaching in a school for orphans in Poona, India. While in India he also spent some time in the Indian film industry; he had a small role in The Legend of Bhagat Singh and a larger role in The Perfect Husband.
