= Surendra Chaturvedi =

Indian journalist

Surendra Chaturvedi (1929–1977) was an Indian journalist.

== Early life and education ==
Born at Rajnandgaon in Chhattisgarh on 15 October 1929, Surendra had his early education at Sikandarpur (District Farukhabad), Gwalior and Holipura in District Agra. His father Kalika Prasad Chaturvedi was a civil contractor who enjoyed reading patriotic poetry and instilled on his son an interest in literature.

Chaturvedi attended Agra and Allahabad universities, where he was interested in drama. In 1954 he sailed for Glasgow, Scotland, to take study management. Once in England, Chaturvedi participated in BBC cultural programmes. He returned to India in 1958.

== Journalism ==
Chaturvedi worked for the Bennett Coleman and Company, first in the Public Relations department and then in the print media wing. He was anchor at the historic inaugural show of Doordarshan (State TV Channel) on 15 September 1959.

Navbharat Times, a sister publication in Hindi of the Times of India, posted Chaturvedi as a special correspondent in 1960 to Lucknow, the capital of Uttar Pradesh.

Chaturvedi was known as one of Lucknow's "eminent journalists".
