= Diverted =

2009 Canadian television miniseries

- UK DVD cover
- Genre: Drama
- Written by: Tony Marchant
- Directed by: Alex Chapple
- Starring: Shawn Ashmore; David Suchet; Joanne Whalley
- Music by: Gary Koftinoff
- Country of origin: Canada
- Original language: English

Production
- Producers: Scott Garvie; Laura Harbin; Noel Hedges
- Cinematography: Miroslaw Baszak
- Editor: Ralph Brunjes
- Running time: 90 minutes
- Production companies: Big Tree Productions; Pope Productions; Shaftesbury Films

Original release
- Network: CBC Television
- Release: March 8, 2009

Diverted is a 2009 CBC made-for-TV drama film. The film was directed by Alex Chapple and written by Tony Marchant. Diverted is a fictionalized account inspired by what actually happened to the people of Gander, Newfoundland, and the passengers and crews on the airliners diverted by the Federal Aviation Administration (FAA) during the 9/11 attacks in Operation Yellow Ribbon.

== Plot ==
On September 11, 2001, as information seeps out about the 9/11 attacks on the US, the FAA begins directing all remaining aircraft in the air to nearby airports, completely clearing the skies. A total of 38 transatlantic flights at or near their "point of no return" (also known as the "point of safe return") are diverted to the nearest airport in Canada, Gander, Newfoundland. The anxious passengers leaving on business and vacation trips have no idea why their flights are being sent to a remote town in Canada. With wild rumours spreading, one British airliner's crew tells the passengers what is known, that a terrorist attack has taken place in the United States.

Personal stories emerge, with Mike Stiven (Shawn Ashmore), the air traffic controller at Gander meeting and falling in love with Alia Ramaswami (Anita Majumdar), a woman on one of the diverted airliners. Like many other passengers, New Yorker Samuel Stearn (David Suchet) is desperate to contact his son, who was in the World Trade Center. Marion Price (Joanne Whalley) and Andrew Tyler (Colin Buchanan) are other passengers who are brought together by their shared experiences.

The town of Gander mobilizes in Operation Yellow Ribbon to welcome the stranded passengers and crews, finding food and accommodations for everyone. Even years later, the connection between the stranded European and American travellers with their Canadian hosts remains strong.

== Cast ==
- Shawn Ashmore as Mike Stiven
- David Suchet as Samuel Stearn
- Joanne Whalley as Marion Price
- Colin Buchanan as Andrew Tyler
- Anita Majumdar as Alia Ramaswami
- Liisa Repo-Martell as Eileen Northbrook
- Anousha Alamianv as Jamal Hassani
- Karen LeBlanc as Nadine
- Mark Caven as Captain Montgomery Crawford
- David Christo as First Officer Paul Denman
- Amy Rutherford as Stewardess
- Rick Boland as Major Reg Bowers
- Greg Malone as Joe Vernon
- Philip Churchill as Nick
- Susan Kent as Dori
- RJ Parrish as Ahmed
- Joe Hynes as Canadian Tire worker

== Production ==
Large wide-body jet airliners descended on Gander, to the surprise of the small populace.

Of the total of 200 aircraft flying over the Atlantic at the time of the 9/11 attacks, 38 flights were diverted to Gander, bringing 6,600 passengers and crew to a town of 9,000. Diverted was filmed during 2008 in the locations where the events occurred, including Gander, as well as St. John's, Newfoundland, Hamilton, Ontario, and London where many of the flights originated.

== Reception ==
Diverted was shown as a mini-series on the Canadian Broadcasting Corporation (CBC) network. Critics noted the personal stories were interesting, but the slow pace of the production bogged it down. Reviewer David Nusair commented, "There's little doubt that Diverted, despite the inherently compelling nature of its premise, never quite becomes anything more than a mildly watchable movie-of-the-week …" Gander's story, even though fictionalized, did make a difference for British reviewer Andy Webb: "… alongside these various storylines about the passengers and friendships it also delivers a heart warming story."

=== Awards and honours ===
At the 2009 Gemini Awards, David Suchet won for Best Performance by an Actor in a Leading Role in a Dramatic Program or Mini-Series. Tony Marchant was also nominated for a 2009 Gemini in the category, Best Writing in a Dramatic Program or Mini-Series.

Director Alex Chapple was nominated for the 2009 DGC Craft Award (Direction - Television Movie/Mini-Series) from the Directors Guild of Canada.

== See also ==
- The Day the World Came to Town, 2002 book
- Come from Away, 2017 musical
  - Come from Away, 2021 musical film
- You Are Here, 2018 documentary film
