= Sohini Paul =

Indian actress

- Born: 31 December 1986 (age 39); Kolkata, India
- Occupation: Actress
- Years active: 2003–present
- Parent(s): Tapas Paul (father); Nandini Paul (mother)

Sohini Paul (born 31 December 1986) is a Bengali Indian film actress. She is the daughter of actor-politician Tapas Paul and his wife, Nandini.

== Career ==
A student of Lakshmipat Singhania Academy in 2004 when she was in Class XII, she made her debut in the Anjan Dutt-directed English film Bow Barracks Forever. Here her role was a wild, erudite Anglo-Indian youngster out to break the rules. After that she was cast by Kaushik Ganguly directed Jackpot in 2009. She also acted in Ekti Meye Tamashi, directed by Salilmoy Ghosh, opposite Jisshu Sengupta.

== Filmography ==
- Bow Barracks Forever (2004) - Sally
- Jackpot (2009) - Mithu Dutta
- Ekti Meye Tamashi (2009)
- Autograph (2010) - Ahona Dasgupta
- Hum Tum Dushman Dushman (2015)

== Television ==
Year	Serial	Role	Channel	Description
2015–17	Chidiya Ghar	Various Characters	SAB TV	Various Episodes
2018	Partners Trouble Ho Gayi Double	Ms. Divya	SAB TV	Episodes (7-8 February 2018)
2018	Aap Ke Aa Jane Se	Supporting Role	Zee TV	
2026	Bigg Boss Bangla 3	Contestant	Star Jalsha	13th place (Evicted Day 28)
