= Solomon Time =

2002 book by Will Randall

- Author: Will Randall
- Language: English
- Published: 2002
- Publisher: Abacus
- Publication place: United Kingdom
- Media type: Print, e-book
- Pages: 304
- ISBN: 0349115028

Solomon Time is a 2002 travel book by English writer Will Randall, subtitled Adventures in the South Pacific. The book was first published in the United Kingdom on 6 June 2002 through Abacus and was published in the United States the following year through Scribner.

== Synopsis ==
The work is based on Randall's memoirs and is an account of his time in the Solomon Islands living in the village of Mendali on Rendova Island of Western Province.

== Reception ==
Critical reception has been positive. The Guardian reviewed the book in the months following its release, writing that Randall had a "deceptively guileless style. This allows him to negotiate the twin hazards which face the travel writer: the boiling feeding frenzy of bravado and the desolate reef of faux naivety." The Washington Post praised the work, stating "At times he works a little too hard to turn on the charm, and he isn't always able to avoid the pitfalls of paternalism that await the Western traveler who ventures to faraway places with strange-sounding names, but he is rescued by a nice inclination toward self-mockery and, even more, by the fundamental decency and humanity of the people of the Solomons."
