= Hum Tum Dushman Dushman =

2015 Indian film directed by Iqbal Durrani

- Directed by: Iqbal Durrani
- Written by: Iqbal Durrani
- Produced by: Akhtar Rasool
- Starring: Mashaal Durrani; Sohini Paul; Mukesh Rishi
- Cinematography: Mukesh Maru
- Edited by: Dhirendra m. Dimri
- Music by: Sahil Rayyan; Ally Ghany; Babajani
- Production company: Dollor Group International
- Release date: 6 February 2015
- Running time: 114 minutes
- Country: India
- Language: Hindi

Hum Tum Dushman Dushman is an Indian war drama film written and directed by Iqbal Durrani. The movie features Mashaal Durrani, Sohini Paul, and Mukesh Rishi in the lead roles. The film was released on 6 February 2015.

== Plot ==
An Indian soldier gets stuck in no man's land along with his Pakistani counterpart. They disregard their differences as they join forces to save the life of a Kashmiri boy who steps onto a mine.

== Cast ==
- Mashaal Durrani as Akbar Khan
- Sohini Paul as Barkha
- Mukesh Rishi as Anil Gujjar
- Master Dhruv Sharma as Young Boy
- Shahbaz Khan
- Parikshit Sahni
- Mushtaq Khan

== Music ==
The music directors of the film are Ally Ghany, Sahil Rayyan, and Babajani. The lyrics were composed by Iqbal Durrani.

No.	Title	Music	Singer(s)	Length
1.	"Tu Mera Yaar Nahi"	Ally Ghany	Shaan	04:53
2.	"Khub Ho Khoobsurat Ho"	Sahil Rayyan	Sam	06:05
3.	"Mohabbat Boss Hai"	Babajani	Sam	03:33
4.	"Ishq Sai"	Ally Ghany	Javed Ali	05:12
