= Bow Barracks =

Locality in Kolkata, India

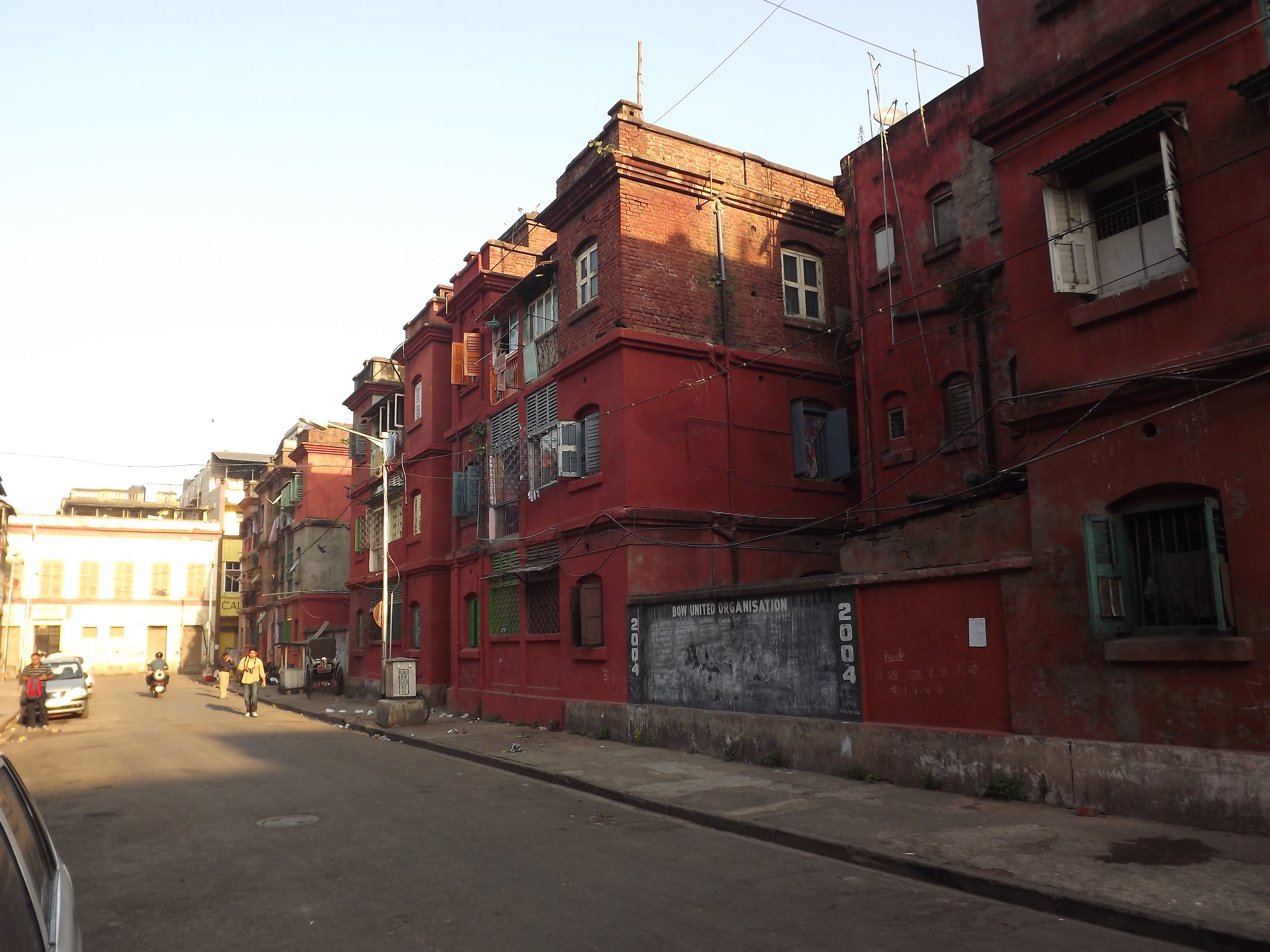
Bow barracks

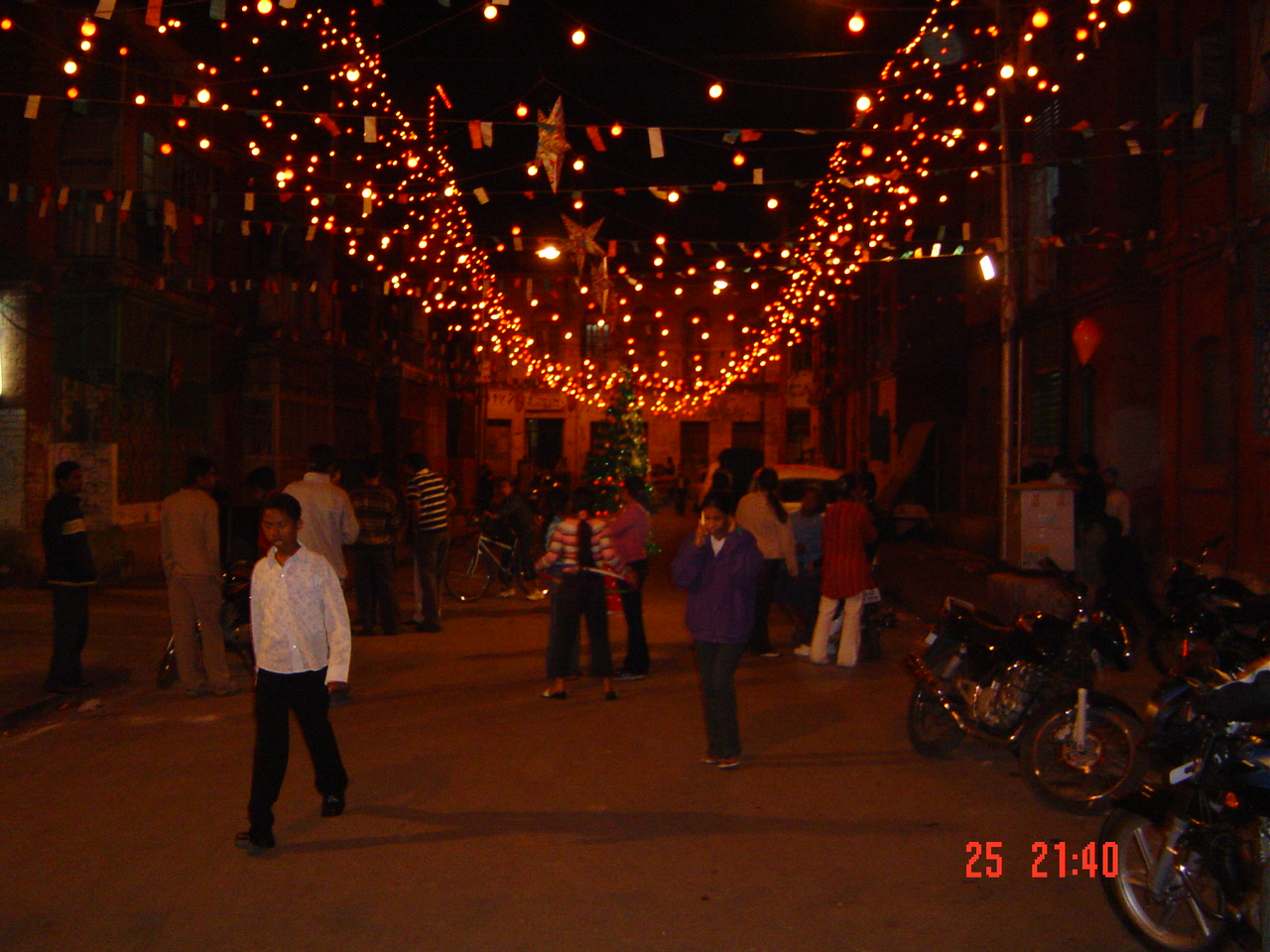
Bow barracks on the eve of Christmas

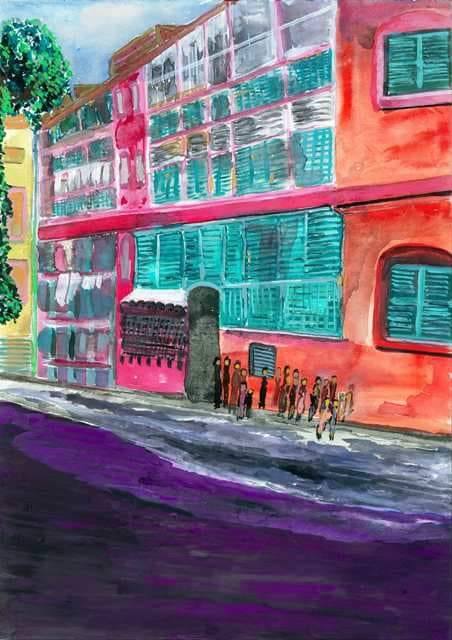
Water color on paper by Amitabh Mitra

Bow Barracks is a locality in the central Kolkata region. It is a small hub of mainly Anglo-Indian people who have lived there for generations. The families currently living there do not pay any rent for their stay as the building is owned by the Kolkata Improvement Trust and have refused to accept a meagre amount of ₹30 paid as rent throughout the years without any increment in rent by the families for their stay.

== Location ==
Bow Barracks is located in central Kolkata. It is behind the Bowbazar police station, off the Central Avenue (now called Chittaranjan Avenue).

The place is in a narrow lane between Hare Street and Bow Bazaar police station. The narrow lane is bordered by six blocks of old three-stored buildings. Their red brick color appear a bit shabby. The green windows frame gay curtains that catch the light breeze now and then.

The Bow Barracks was a garrison's mess built for the army during World War I. But there are no written records to prove these facts. When the soldiers left India, they handed over the apartments to the Anglo Indians who took them on rent. Today, 132 families live in the Barracks. Of them, 80 percent of the residents are Anglo Indians. It has acquired a reputation of sorts for its Christmas celebrations.

== See also ==
- Bow Barracks Forever, 2004 film, based on the life of Anglo-Indian community, is named after this locality.
