= Chaturvedi =

Surname of Indian origin

Chaturvedi is an Indian Hindu surname which means "expert of the four Vedas: Atharva Veda", Sama Veda, Yajur Veda, and Rig Veda. The surname Chaturvedi traditionally refers to a Brahmin scholar proficient in all four Vedas. The name embodies a legacy of deep intellectual pursuit and mastery of sacred knowledge.

While variations in spelling or regional adaptations may exist, the essence of the name consistently reflects Vedic scholarship and erudition.

Notable people with the surname include:

- Avani Chaturvedi- first female fighter pilot of India
- Mithilesh Chaturvedi- Indian actor
- B. K. Chaturvedi- civil servant
- Chaturvedi Badrinath - IAS officer and writer
- Juhi Chaturvedi- screenwriter
- Geet Chaturvedi- poet and novelist
- Lalit Kishore Chaturvedi- Indian politician, Bharatiya Janata Party leader of Rajasthan, member of the Rajya Sabha
- Makhanlal Chaturvedi - Hindi writer
- Nishi Chaturvedi- British epidemiologist
- Priyanka Chaturvedi- former Indian National Congress spokesperson
- Sanjiv Chaturvedi- bureaucrat
- Siddhant Chaturvedi- actor
- Surendra Chaturvedi- journalist and activist
- T. N. Chaturvedi - governor of Karnataka from 2002 to 2007
