= Lushin Dubey =

Indian stage actor and director

- Occupations: stage actor and director
- Relatives: Lilette Dubey (sister); Neha Dubey (niece); Ira Dubey (niece)
- Website: lushindubey.com

Lushin Dubey is an Indian stage actor and director. She has directed, acted and scripted many drama productions for over 20 years. Lushin is also known for her solo plays like Untitled and Pinki Virani's Bitter Chocolate with theatre director Arvind Gaur. She has acted in films like Partition (2007), Murder Unveiled (2005) — for which she won 2006 Gemini Award for Best Performance by an Actress in a Featured Supporting Role in a Dramatic Program or Mini-Series — and Perfect Husband. She has also acted in some Hindi films.

== Personal life ==
Lushin was born in a Sindhi Hindu family and her maiden name was Lushin Keswani. Her father, Govind Keswani, was an engineer with the Indian Railways, and her mother, Leela, was a gynaecologist who worked with the Indian Army. She was named by her father after the Russian aircraft Ilyushin.

Lushin studied M.Sc. in Childhood and Special Education in the US, after a Masters in History from the Lady Shri Ram College for Women (LSR), University of Delhi, India.

Lushin is married and has two daughters, Ilina and Tara. Her sister Lillete and niece Ira are also actresses. She also has a brother named Patanjali. Her husband Pradeep Dubey is a Professor of Economics at Stony Brook University and adjunct professor at Yale. In her college days she acted with Barry John.

== Theatre ==
Lushin's first solo play was called Untitled which was directed and scripted by Arvind Gaur, traveled to the US, UK and the Edinburgh Fringe Festival. Untitled has completed more than 200 shows. Some of the cities have been Boston, Chicago, Rochester, New York, Dallas, Houston, Washington, D.C., and Palo Alto. It has been staged at the Smithsonian Institution and at Harvard.

Her second solo Bitter Chocolate is based on Pinki Virani's book and scripted-directed by Arvind Gaur.

Lushin Dubey's third solo I Will Not Cry is scripted and directed by Arvind Gaur. This play is an exceptional blend of theatre and multimedia, highlighting the issue of child survival through satire, reality and music excerpts. It brings alive the sad truth of millions of unnecessary deaths of children in India. The performance by Lushin Dubey evokes collective responsibility among the audience to be a part of social change. The play has been performed in Delhi, Mumbai, Kolkata, Jaipur and Lucknow in collaboration of Save The Children.

Her fourth solo play with Theatre director Arvind Gaur is 'Aruna's Story' based on Pinki Virani's book on Aruna Shanbaug case. Gaur scripted it as solo play.

She has directed the play Life of Gautam Budda, Mushkan. She acted with Alyque Padamsee in William Shakespeare's Macbeth. In 2009 she directed Salam India, a play inspired by diplomat writer Pavan K. Varma's very well-received book, Being Indian.

== Filmography ==
Year	Title	Role
2003	The Perfect Husband	
2005	Amu	Meera Sehgal
2005	Socha Na Tha	
2005	Murder Unveiled (TV)	Kuldeep Samra
2007	Partition	Mumtaz Khan
2011	Delhi Belly	Sonia's mother
2013	Rangrezz	Rati Chaturvedi
2016	Saat Uchakkey	Sona's mother
2016	Mantra	Meenakshi Kapoor

== TV serials ==
- Rajdhani
- Made in Heaven (2019) - Sheila Naqvi (Faiza Naqvi's mother)

== Awards ==
- Gemini Award for Best Performance by an Actress in a Featured Supporting Role in a Dramatic Program or Mini-Series, 2006
- Karmaveer Puraskaar Noble Laureates, 2009
- Radha Krishna Award for her contribution to Delhi’s art & culture, 2009
