= Bow Barracks Forever =

- Bow Barracks Forever poster
- Directed by: Anjan Dutt
- Written by: Anjan Dutt
- Starring: Lilette Dubey; Victor Bannerjee; Avijit Dutt; Neha Dubey; Clayton Rodgers; Moon Moon Sen; Sabyasachi Chakrabarty; Sohini Paul; George Baker
- Cinematography: Indranil Mukherjee
- Edited by: Arghyakamal Mitra
- Music by: Neel Dutt; Anjan Dutt; Usha Uthup
- Distributed by: Pritish Nandy Communications
- Release date: 1 December 2004
- Running time: 118 minutes
- Country: India
- Languages: English; Hindi; Bengali

Bow Barracks Forever (2004) is an Indian film directed by Anjan Dutt about Anglo-Indians and their difficulties in retaining their identity since the end of British India.

== Plot ==
The film is about the disaster of the human spirit. It is not easy to fight back the march of progress. Progress brings with it change, often painful, that breaks continuity and destroys tradition, history, power and passion of communities that have lived and grown together over decades. Anjan Dutt's film captures the real-life story of a tiny, resolute Anglo-Indian community right in the heart of bustling north Kolkata trying desperately to keep alive its hopes, dreams, aspirations and identity, as the world around them changes swiftly and tries to impose that change on them and their lives.

== Cast ==
- Lilette Dubey
- Victor Bannerjee
- Avijit Dutt
- Neha Dubey
- Clayton Rodgers
- Moon Moon Sen
- Sabyasachi Chakrabarty
- Sohini Paul
- George Baker

== See also ==
- Bow Barracks – a locality of Kolkata, known for being a small hub of mainly Anglo-Indian population.
