= Saurabh Dubey =

Saurabh Dubey may refer to:

- Saurabh Dubey (Uttar Pradesh cricketer) (born 1988), Indian cricketer
- Saurabh Dubey (Maharashtra cricketer) (born 1998), Indian cricketer
