= Ira Dubey =

Indian actress

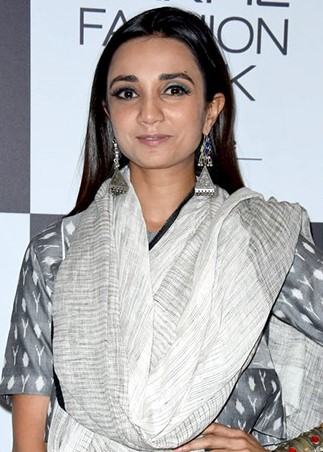
- Dubey on Lakme Fashion Week 2017
- Born: Delhi, India
- Occupation: Actress
- Mother: Lillete Dubey
- Relatives: Neha Dubey (sister); Lushin Dubey (aunt)

Ira Dubey is an Indian actress who has appeared on TV, in theatre and in Bollywood films.

== Biography ==
In 2016, in addition to playing Nora in A Doll's House, she completed shooting for two feature films, Dharma & Red Chillies Productions' Dear Zindagi, directed by Gauri Shinde and starring Alia Bhatt and Shah Rukh Khan and an independent feature film, Shehjar, directed by Nikhil Allug, in which she plays the lead.

She currently hosts a show for Zee TV called A Table for Two.

== Filmography ==
Key
†	Denotes film or TV productions that have not yet been released

Year	Title	Role	Notes	Ref
2007	Marigold			
2009	The President Is Coming	Archana Kapoor		
2010	Aisha	Pinky Bose		
2011	Turning 30	Yamini Punjwani		
2012	M Cream	Jay		
2015	Dilliwali Zaalim Girlfriend	Nimmy		
2015	Aisa Yeh Jahaan	Ananya Saikia		
2016	Dear Zindagi	Fatima/Fatty		
2017	Shehjar	Mariyam		
2022	The Daughter		Short	

=== Television & Web series ===
Year	Title	Role	References
2021, 2023	Potluck	Akanksha Shastri	
2023-	Scoop	Anita Mohan	
2024-	Freedom at midnight	Fatima Jinnah	
