= Lillete Dubey =

Indian actress and theatre director

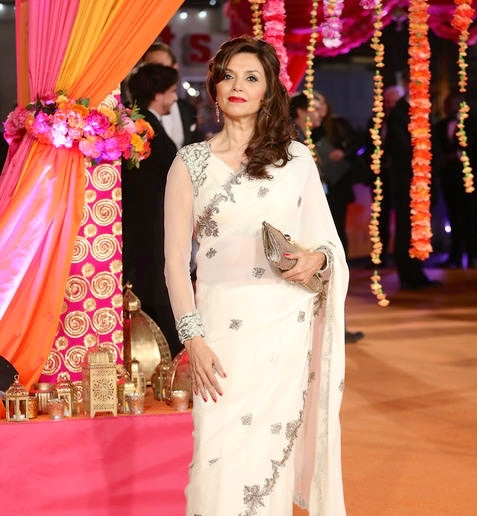
- Lillete Dubey at the premiere of The Second Best Exotic Marigold Hotel in 2015
- Born: Lillete Keswani; 7 September 1953 (age 73); Pune, Bombay State, India
- Occupations: Actress, Director
- Spouse: Ravi Dubey (m. 1978; died 2015)
- Children: Neha Dubey; Ira Dubey
- Relatives: Lushin Dubey (sister)

Lillete Dubey (born 7 September 1953) is an Indian actress and theatre director. She has worked in Indian and international theatre, television and films in Hindi and English languages. Dubey began her career with Barry John in Delhi and was the founding member of his group – Theatre Action Group in 1973. In 1991 she set up her own theatre company – The Primetime Theatre Company.

Dubey is best known for her film performances Zubeidaa, Monsoon Wedding (Winner Golden Lion at the Venice Film Festival), Chalte Chalte, Baghban, Kal Ho Naa Ho, My Brother…Nikhil, Delhi in a Day, Bow Barracks Forever (Best Actress Filma Madrid International Film Festival), 3 Days to Go (Best Actress Simon Sabela Awards, KZN South Africa), The Best Exotic Marigold Hotel (BAFTA- Best Ensemble Cast) and The Second Best Exotic Marigold Hotel, and Sonata.

In theatre, she is known for her work like, '30 Days in September', 'Adhe Adhure' (Best Actress Mahindra Excellence in Theatre Awards), 'August - Osage County', Dance Like a Man, 'Where did I Leave my Purdah', and 'Salaam Noni Appa' amongst others.

== Early life ==
Dubey was born Lillete Keswani on 7 September 1953 in Pune to Sindhi Hindu parents. Her father, Gobind Keswani, was an engineer with the Indian Railways, and her mother, Lila Keswani, was a gynaecologist from Lady Hardinge Medical College who later worked with the Indian Army. After Dubey's birth the family moved to Bikaner and later to Lucknow where she studied at Loreto Convent and then went to Rustom Boarding school in Pune. After Rustoms, she came to Delhi and studied at Carmel Convent. When she was in Class IX, the family moved back to Pune and she joined St. Mary's (Pune), where she first started acting. She completed her M.A in English from Lady Shri Ram College in New Delhi and her second master's degree in mass communications from IIMC.

== Personal life ==
Lillete Dubey married Ravi Dubey in 1978. Ravi Dubey died of pancreatic cancer in 2015. The couple have two daughters, Neha Dubey and Ira Dubey, both of whom have played a variety of small and supporting roles in theatre, film and television.

Lillete is the eldest of three siblings. She has a sister, Lushin, and a brother, Patanjali. He is the founder of the Lemon Tree hotel group. Lushin is married to Pradeep Dubey, a noted academic.

== Career ==
=== Films ===
Lillete Dubey's entry into films was quite by chance when her husband was posted to Mumbai in 1995, and she has often called herself an 'accidental film actress’. She debuted with the film Love You Hamesha starring Akshaye Khanna and Sonali Bendre in 1999. The movie was directed by Kailash Surendranath. After that, she played a supporting character in Bawandar, directed by Jag Mundhra and starring Nandita Das, in 2000. It was based on the story of a rape victim, Bhanwari Devi, from Rajasthan. Her career breakthrough was in 2001 when she essayed the role of Aunty Rose in Shyam Benegal's classic Zubeida and won many hearts and next as Shabana, the mother of the female protagonist Sakeena (played by Amisha Patel) in the movie Gadar: Ek Prem Katha. Her second hit, Monsoon Wedding, came out later in the same year and became yet another milestone in her film career. Divya Unny from Open (Indian magazine) said,

She acted in her first film Zubeidaa (2001) at the age of 47 which would have been considered a late start for an actor. Even as an independent actor, Dubey created a niche. She has defied expectations many times on screen. She was the only actress her age who could carry off smoking a cigarette in a shiny blouse and petticoat, with rollers in her hair, in Monsoon Wedding (2001)."

The following year, in 2002, she again portrayed the role of one of the lead characters’ mother in the movie Om Jai Jagadish, directed by Anupam Kher. Her on-screen daughter was Urmila Matondkar. She played the role of ‘Shanti Patel’, the wife of Paresh Rawal in Baghban (2003).

She played the role of Jaswinder "Jazz" Kapoor in Kal Ho Naa Ho, in 2003. She played Jazz, an older female character that is fierce, unapologetic, and in touch with her sexuality. In 2004 she played the role of Preity Zinta's reel mother in the movie Lakshya. The film was directed by Farhan Akhtar and starred Hrithik Roshan as the male lead. In the same year, she also worked in Anjan Dutt's Bow Barracks Forever, a film that revolved around the troubles faced by the Anglo-Indian people to keep up their lifestyle, in the post-independence era and which won her the Best Actress award at the Madrid International Film Festival.

Lillete worked on a long short film ‘Seasons Greetings’ with Celina Jaitley. Her short film works include Sonata & Purana Pyaar. Her other work includes Qubool hai 2 at Zee5 premium where she plays Nilofer, alongside Karan Singh Grover and Surbhi Jyoti.

=== Theatre ===
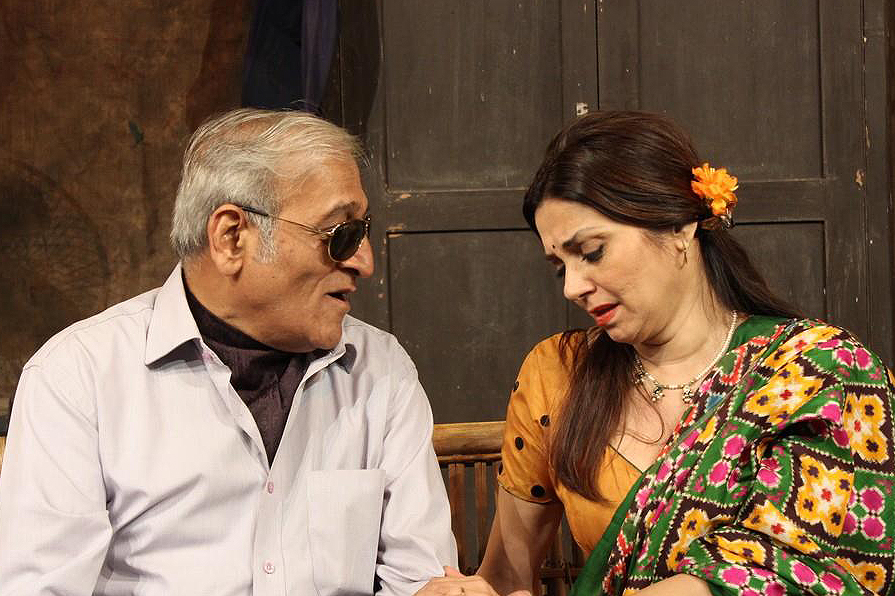
Mohan and Lillete performing in a play Aadhe Adhoore at Bharat Bhavan, Bhopal, 2022

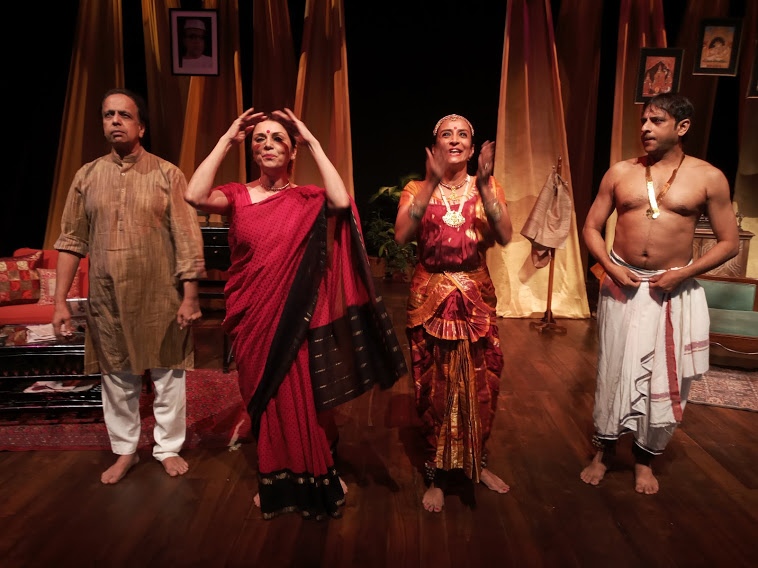
"Dance like a Man" performance with cast, Ananth Mahadevan, Lillette Dubey, Suchitra Pillai & Joy Sengupta, 2021.

Dubey has an acting career of over 40 years, and has played the lead in over 60 productions ranging from Shakespeare, Greek Tragedy, Brecht, Musical Comedies, Farce, Contemporary Drama, Absurd Theatre, to Contemporary Drama, including Ibsen, Tennessee Williams, Arthur Miller, Pinter, Dario Fo, Edward Albee, and Indian playwrights like Vijay Tendulkar, Partap Sharma, Mahesh Dattani, Girish Karnad, Mahesh Elkunchwar. Dubey is also a founder member of the prestigious Delhi based Theatre Action Group.

In 1991, Dubey co-founded The Primetime Theatre Co., with the intention of promoting original Indian writing, and has directed 33 productions for the company so far.

The Prime Time Theatre Company's productions, directed by Ms Dubey, have traveled widely across India and abroad, with shows at the Bloomsbury Theatre in London, at the Tribecca in New York, at the Portland International Performance Festival in the U.S., as well as in Chicago, San Francisco, Houston, Dallas, Washington DC, Stamford, Raleigh (North Carolina), Los Angeles, Boston and New York in the U.S.

One of Dubey's most notable productions - Dance Like a Man by Mahesh Dattani, is the longest running Indian play in English, having completed over 650 shows across the world, including a two-week off-Broadway run.

== Plays ==
Year	Name of Play	Role
1991	Blithe Spirit	Lead actor, Directed and Produced by Lillete Dubey and Sita Raina
1991	Romantic Comedy	Lead actor, Directed and Produced by Lillete Dubey and Sita Raina
1992	Prisoner of Malabar Hill	Lead Actor, Produced by Lillete Dubey and Sita Raina
1992	On The Razzle	Lead actor, Directed and Produced by Lillete Dubey and Sita Raina
1993	All About Eve	Lead Actor, Directed and Produced by Lillete Dubey and Sita Raina
1993	Don't Drink The Water	Lead Actor, Directed and Produced by Lillete Dubey and Sita Raina
1993	Plaza Suite	Lead Actor, Directed and Produced by Lillete Dubey and Sita Raina
1994	Lost in Yonkers	Directed and Produced by Lillete Dubey and Sita Raina
1994	Me and My Girl	Lead Actor, Directed and Produced by Lillete Dubey and Sita Raina
1994	Post Mortem	Directed and Produced by Lillete Dubey and Sita Raina
1995	Dance Like a Man	Lead Actor, Director and Producer
1996	Autobiography	Lead Actor and Director
1998	Jaya The Victory (an operatic montage of the Mahabharata)	Director and Producer
1998	On a Muggy Night in Mumbai	Lead Actor, Director and Producer
2000	Siren City	Lead Actor, Director and Producer
2000	Breathe in Breathe out	Lead Actor, Director and Producer
2000	Zen Katha	Director and Producer
2001	30 Days in September	Lead Actor, Director and Producer
2003	Womanly voices	Director
2005	Sammy	Director and Producer
2007	Kanyadaan	Lead Actor, Director and Producer
2008	Wedding Album	Director and Producer
2009	Brief Candle	Director and Producer
2010	Love on The Brink	Director and Producer
2011	Adhe Adhure	Lead Actor, Director and Producer
2011	August - Osage County	Lead Actor and Director
2012	Where did I leave my Purdah	Lead Actor and Director
2013	9 Parts of Desire	Director and Producer
2014	Boiled Beans on Toast	Director and Producer
2015	Gauhar	Director and Producer
2016	The Dancing Donkey	Director and Producer
2017	Salaam Noni Appa	Lead Actor, Director and Producer
2019	Devika Rani	Director and Producer

== Filmography ==
Key
†	Denotes films that have not yet been released

=== Films ===
Year	Title	Role	Notes
1999	Love You Hamesha		Delayed release
2000	Bawandar	Anita	
2001	Zubeidaa	Rose Davenport	
2001	Gadar: Ek Prem Katha	Shabana	
2001	Monsoon Wedding	Pimmi Verma	
2002	Om Jai Jagadish	Neetu's mom	
2003	Pinjar	Tara and Puro's mother	
2003	Johnny	Johnny's step mother	Telugu film
2003	Chalte Chalte	Anna Mausi (Priya's aunt)	
2003	Baghban	Shanti Patel	
2003	Kal Ho Naa Ho	Jaswinder "Jazz" Kapoor	
2004	Lakshya	Mrs. Dutta, Romila's mother	
2004	Vanity Fair	Ms. Green	
2004	Morning Raga	Mrs. Kapoor	
2004	Sau Jhooth Ek Sach	Moushami Pradhan	
2004	Bow Barracks Forever	Emily Lobo	
2005	My Brother…Nikhil	Anita Rosario Kapoor	
2005	Main Aisa Hi Hoon	Ritu	
2005	Dosti: Friends Forever	Kiran Thapar	
2006	Fanaa	Helen	
2006	Corporate	Devyani Bakshi	
2006	Aap Ki Khatir	Betty A. Khanna	
2007	My Name Is Anthony Gonsalves	Bharucha	
2007	Har Pal	Gallery Owner	
2008	Saas Bahu Aur Sensex	Anita B. Jethmalani	
2009	Phoonk	Dr. Seema Walke	
2009	Hari Puttar: A Comedy of Terrors	Santosh 'Toshi'	
2010	Bollywood Beats	Jyoti	
2010	Pankh	Mary D'Cunha	
2010	Housefull	Zulekha Bano	
2010	Break Ke Baad	Pammi J. Gulati	
2011	Always Kabhi Kabhi	Ms Das	
2011	Na Jaane Kabse	Monica	
2012	Delhi in a Day	Kalpana	
2012	The Best Exotic Marigold Hotel	Mrs. Kapoor	British film
2012	Shobhna's Seven Nights	Malishka	
2012	I M 24	Don's wife	
2012	Heroine	Mrs. Arora	
2013	Chashme Baddoor	Ms Josephine	
2013	Dabba (The Lunchbox)	Ila's mother	
2014	One by Two	Kalpana Patel	
2014	Dr. Cabbie	Nellie	Canadian film
2015	The Second Best Exotic Marigold Hotel	Mrs. Kapoor	British film
2015	A Million Rivers	Roop	
2016	Mahayoddha Rama	Kaikeyi (voice)	Animated film
2017	Aksar 2	Dolly Khambatta	
2017	Sonata	Subhadra	
2019	3 Days to Go	Matriarch Lakshmi Isaac	South African film
2019	Jhootha Kahin Ka	Ruchi Mehta	
2022	Tadka	Samantha Mascarenhas	
2023	Blind	Maria Aunty	
2023	Yaariyan 2	Mrs. Chibber	
2025	Songs of Paradise	Khala	
2026	Ginny Wedss Sunny 2	Neelu	

=== Television ===
Year	Show	Role	Channel	Notes
1984	Hum Log		DD National	First serial on National Network DD
	Janpath Kiss		DD National	A telefilm by Ranjit Kapoor
	Prisoner of Malabar Hill		DD National	Telefilm
	Newsline		EL TV	The first serial for EL TV costarring Vinod Nagpal
	A Mouthful of Sky			The first English Serial on Indian Television
1995	Samandar	Vasundhara	ZEE TV	Co-starring Kabir Bedi
1996	Just Mohabbat		Sony TV	Co-starring Ravi Baswani
1997	Kabhi Kabhi	Shama Joshi	Star Plus	Co-starring Alok Nath
1998	Vakalat		Zee TV	Co-starring Manohar Singh
1998	Aur Phir Ek Din	Supporting Role of Chandani	Star Plus	Co-starring Kiran Kumar
	Raahein	Role of a headstrong Mother - Lata	Zee TV	Co-starring Shefali Shetty
2000	Driving Miss Palmen			Feature Film for Dutch Television
2000	Apna Apna Style	Shalini	ZEE TV	Co-starring Ratna Pathak Shah
2006	By Invitation Only	Host	TIMES NOW	.
	Khushi		B4U TV	Co-starring Mohan Joshi
	Piyaa Bina		ZEE TV	Co-starring Kulbhushan Kharbanda
	Mumbai Calling		BBC1	Star appearance in 1 episode
	Indian Summers	Roshana Dalal	Channel 1	2 Seasons all episodes co starring Roshan Seth
2015	Darr Sabko Lagta Hai	Nanny	&Tv	
	Dance Like a Man		Hotstar	Cineplay
	Adhe Adhure		Hotstar	Cineplay
	Kanyadaan		Hotstar	Cineplay
	Womanly voices		ZEE5	Cineplay
2018	Love Handles (Ep05 - #PuranaPyaar)	Mrs. Sharma	Gorilla Shorts - YouTube	Romantic Comedy Web Series
	The Art of Shantiniketan	Host	Epic Channel	An Art Documentary
2023	Star Wars: Visions	Rugal (voice)	Disney+	Episode: "The Bandits of Golak"

=== Short films and Web series ===
Year	Title	Role	Language	Notes
2017	Chhoti	Mother	Hindi	Short Film
2018	Purana Pyaar	Mrs. Sharma	Hindi	Finalist for Filmfare Short Film awards
2018	Akoori	Rita Shah	Hindi	Web Series
2018	Yeh Crazy Dil	Sunaina	Hindi	Web Series
2019	Queen	TV Host	Tamil / Hindi / English	Web Series
2020	Seasons Greetings	Suchitra	Hindi	Short Film
2020	Unpaused	Archana	Hindi	An Amazon Original Film
2021	Qubool Hai 2.0	Nilofer	Hindi	Web Series
2021	Call My Agent: Bollywood	As herself	Hindi	Web Series
2023	Made in Heaven	Lina Mendez	Hindi	Season 2
2025	Dabba Cartel	Mrs. Moushami Majumdar	Hindi	Season 1
TBA	Reunion II	Neena	Hindi	Web Series
TBA	Birth	Mama Nithya	Hindi	Short film
TBA	Shock Ahlad	Grandmother	Bengali / Hindi / English	Web series
2024	Showtime	Sarika Viktor	Hindi	Web-series
2024	Zindaginama		Hindi	web series

== Nominations and awards ==
Nominated

- Best Supporting Actress - STAR Screen Awards for the film ‘My Brother Nikhil’ in 2005.

Won

- Best Actress for the film, 'Bow Barracks Forever' at the Madrid International Film Festival, 2008.
- Best Actress for the film “Pankh” at the Dainik Jagran National Film Festival, 2010.
- Best Actress for her play ‘Adhe Adhure’ at Mahindra Excellence in Theatre awards, 2012.
- Jury Mention for Best Actress for the film ‘3 Days to Go’ at the Global Indian Film Festival 2019. This movie also received 3 more awards for ‘Best Feature Film’,‘Best Screenplay Feature’ and ‘ Best Editing Feature’.
- Best Actress for the film ‘3 Days to Go’ at the Simon Mabhunu Sabela Film and Television Awards 2019.
- Best Actress for ‘Seasons Greetings’ at the Ayodhya Film Festival, 2020.
