= Dubey & Schaldenbrand =

Luxury watch company

Dubey & Schaldenbrand is a luxury watch company headquartered in La Chaux-de-Fonds in Switzerland. The company produces small quantities of Automatic watches and mechanical watches.

== History ==
Dubey & Schaldenbrand was founded in 1946 by Georges Dubey and René Schaldenbrand. In 1995, Cinette Robert revived the company. She used a movement collection that she had amassed during the 1970s and early 1980s.

Dubey & Schaldenbrand recases each movement according to the era when it was created. Dubey & Schaldenbrand designs rapidly found a niche with watch collectors.

As of 2002, one of its distributors in the United States was Kenjo in New York City.
