= Chaturvedi Badrinath =

Indian writer and civil servant

Chaturvedi Badrinath (1933 – 17 February 2010) was an Indian writer, philosopher and Indian Administrative Service officer. He served in the IAS from 1957 to 1989 and spent much of his administrative career in Tamil Nadu. His book The Mahabharata: An Inquiry in the Human Condition received the 2009 Sahitya Akademi Award for English.

Badrinath was born in Mainpuri, Uttar Pradesh, in 1933. He later joined the Indian Administrative Service, serving from 1957 to 1989. He was a Homi Bhabha Fellow from 1971 to 1973 and was a visiting professor at Heidelberg University in 1971, where he delivered seminars on the concept of dharma and its application to contemporary life.

His writing focused on Indian philosophy, particularly the Mahabharata, dharma and the relationship between religious traditions in India. His major works include Dharma, India and the World Order: Twenty-one Essays (1993), Finding Jesus in Dharma: Christianity in India (2000), Swami Vivekananda: The Living Vedanta (2006), The Mahabharata: An Inquiry in the Human Condition (2006), and The Women of the Mahabharata: The Question of Truth (2008).

The Mahabharata: An Inquiry in the Human Condition examines the epic as a philosophical inquiry into themes including dharma, artha, kama, moksha, freedom, equality, friendship and human relationships. The work won the Sahitya Akademi Award in 2009 in the category of critical analysis.

Badrinath died in February 2010 in Puducherry.

== Works ==
- Dharma, India and the World Order: Twenty-one Essays (1993)
- Introduction to the Kamasutra (1999)
- Finding Jesus in Dharma: Christianity in India (2000)
- Swami Vivekananda: The Living Vedanta (2006)
- The Mahabharata: An Inquiry in the Human Condition (2006)
- The Women of the Mahabharata: The Question of Truth (2008)
- Unity of Life and Other Essays (2016), edited by Tulsi Badrinath
- "Das Mahabharata: Eine Erkundung der conditio humana", in Katrin Seele and Peter Seele (eds.), Ordnung in Übergängen (2012), pp. 270–281
