= Sourav Dubey =

Indian cricketer

Sourav Dubey is an Indian cricketer. He is a right-handed batsman who currently plays for Tripura.

Dubey made five appearances for Tripura Under-22s in the CK Nayudu trophy competition of 2007–08, scoring a half-century in his first appearance, and a century in his third. Although his form for the Under-22s stumbled towards the end of the competition, he made his List A debut in February 2008 – finishing close to a century in his second game.

Dubey made his first-class debut in the 2008-09 Ranji Trophy, against Services.
