= Dube (surname) =

- Language: zulu, ndebele and xhosa

Origin
- Meaning: sharp minded tribe
- Region of origin: Quebec (Dube); Southern Africa (Dube)

Dube is a French surname, commonly found in Quebec. Dube is also a common surname among the Zulu, Ndebele, and Xhosa peoples of Southern Africa. Dube is also a common Hindu Brahmin surname, more commonly written as Dubey or Dwivedi. It is also a surname among the Wends. Notable people with the surname Dube or Dube include:

== Journalism ==
- Michelle Dubé, Canadian news anchor
- Jonathan Dube, online journalist
- Phesheya Dube, Swazi journalist

== Musicians ==
- Jean Dubé (musician) (born 1981), French pianist
- Lucky Philip Dube (1964–2007), South African reggae musician

== Politicians ==
- Antoine Dubé (born 1947), Quebec member of the Canadian House of Commons
- Christian Dubé (politician) (born 1956), Quebec MNA
- Claire L'Heureux-Dubé (born 1927), justice on the Supreme Court of Canada
- Fernand Dubé (1928–1999), New Brunswick politician
- Jabulani Dube (died 2013), Zimbabwean politician
- Jean F. Dubé (born 1962), New Brunswick member of the Canadian House of Commons and businessman
- Jean-Eudes Dubé (1926–2019), member of the Prime Minister's Cabinet and Canadian House of Commons
- John Langalibalele Dube (1871–1946), South African politician and a founding member of the ANC
- Madeleine Dubé (born 1961), New Brunswick social worker and politician
- Matthew Dubé (born 1988), Canadian politician
- Mildred Reason Dube (died 2022), Zimbabwean politician
- Ramesh Dube (born 1942), Indian politician
- Sneha Dube Pandit, Indian politician

== Sports ==
- Christian Dubé (ice hockey) (born 1977), Canadian National Hockey League player
- Dillon Dubé (born 1998), Canadian ice hockey player
- Glody Dube (born 1978), Botswana Olympic 800m runner
- Jessica Dubé (born 1987), Canadian figure skater
- Joseph Dube (1944–2025), American Olympic weightlifter
- Ndaba Dube (born 1959), Zimbabwean bantamweight Olympic boxer
- Thamsanqa Dube, Zimbabwean heavyweight boxing champion

== Other people ==
- Alexa-Jeanne Dubé, Canadian actress and filmmaker
- Desmond Dube, South African entertainer
- Manon Dubé (1967–1978), Canadian murder victim
- Nothando Dube (1987–2019), 12th wife of Mswati III of Eswatini
- Saurabh Dube (born 1960), Indian scholar
- Arindrajit Dube, economist

== See also ==
- Dwivedi or Dube, an Indian Brahmin surname
