= G. G. Dwivedi =

Indian Army career officer

Major General G G Dwivedi
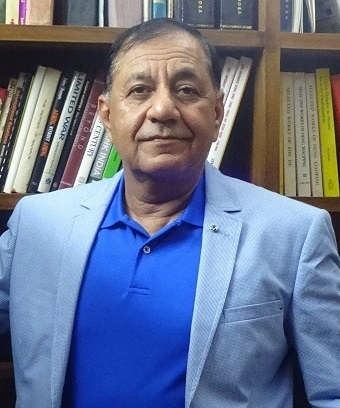
- Military career
- Allegiance: India
- Branch: Indian Army
- Service years: 38
- Rank: Major General
- Unit: Jat Regiment

Major General G G Dwivedi (Sena Medal, Vishisht Seva Medal and BAR) (born in Kolkata) is an Indian Army career officer (retired), academic, journalist, author, corporate trainer and social worker. He retired in 2009 from the Indian Army (Infantry).

== Early life and education ==
Dwivedi was born in Kolkata. His parents were Omprakash (1913–1991) and Vilma Devi (1920–2005) His grandfather was eminent physician Rai Sahib Dr. Dewan Chand Dwivedi (1888–1971). He attended the Sainik School, Amaravathinagar and then in 1968 joined the National Defence Academy, Khadakwasla. He holds an MSc in Defence Studies, dual M Phil in Defence and Strategic Studies from Madras University and a PhD in international relations from Jawaharlal Nehru University (JNU) New Delhi.

== Military career ==
Major General Dwivedi retired as assistant chief of the Integrated Defence Staff in 2009, after 38 years of distinguished service in the army (infantry). He is a veteran of the Bangladesh War and he later commanded 16 JAT in Siachen, a brigade in the Kashmir Valley and a mountain division in the North East. He was India's Defence Attaché in China from 19 January 1997 to 19 August 1999.

== Other work ==
He contributed to the operational planning for 2010 Commonwealth Games, and was in charge of Spectator Services at the 2010 Commonwealth Games in India.

== Academia ==
=== Academic career ===
In his academic career Major General Dwivedi has achieved distinction recognition both at national and global levels. He holds

- MSc in Defence Studies Madras University (1985)
- M Phil in Defence and Strategic Studies from Madras University (2001, 2012)
- PhD in international relations from Jawaharlal Nehru University (JNU) New Delhi (Degree Conferred 2011)
- Interpretership in Chinese from the School of Foreign Languages (1996)
- Alumnus of National Defence College
- Faculty Indian Military Academy Dehradun (1981–1983)
- Faculty Defence Staff College Wellington (1999–2000)
- Visiting Faculty at Foreign Services Institute Delhi, Lal Bahadur Shastri National Academy of Administration. Mussoorie, Management Development Institute Gurgaon, Lal Bahadur Institute of Management Delhi, Punjab University (PU) Chandigarh and UGC HRD Centers, GNDU JNU, JMI and PU
- Member of renowned think tanks, regularly guest speaks at premier Centers of Excellence both in India and abroad, and frequently appears on national TV as a panellist

=== Development programmes ===
- Art & Practice of leadership Development from Harvard Kennedy School, 2012
- Leadership in Public Life from Kansas Leadership Center, USA, 2012

=== Aligarh Muslim University (AMU) ===
Since 2013, he has been Professor in the Department of West Asian Studies, Aligarh Muslim University; where he is instrumental in establishing new Faculty of International Studies and was the Founder Chairperson Departments of Foreign Languages. He is a Visiting Faculty to Foreign Services Institute Delhi, Management Development Institute Gurgaon, Lal Bahadur Shastri Institute of Management (LBSIM) Delhi, Punjab University Chandigarh is a resource person for Foreign Services Institute Delhi, UGC HRD Centers of leading Central Universities. He was instrumental in the introduced new course- 'Art & Practice-Leadership' and 'CSR' IN LBSIM, besides facilitated starting M Phil in Strategic Studies at Punjab University.

The students' union pursued the restoration of AMU's minority character. AMU was established for the educational development of the Muslims of India and its essential character was enshrined in the Parliamentary Act of 1920 and the AMU Amendment Act of 1981 but the Allahabad High Court has ruled that AMU is not a minority institution. In April 2016, the Indian government advised the court it would not appeal the decision.

In Jan 2016 Dwivedi's position was Professor and Chairperson, Faculty of International Studies and he was also appointed Coordinator of the Academic Programmes to be introduced in the Department of Strategic and Security Studies.

=== Published works ===
Dwivedi has written on military history, geostrategy, international relations and leadership in professional journals and national dailies. Additionally, he has contributed over fifty shorts pieces in the leading natural dailies, based on his personal experience.

Books

- War in Vietnam 1945–54 (1991)
- Korea – the Limited War (1989)
- Leadership Manual (2009)
- 1962 Views from the other side of the Hill – co-author
- Global Geo Strategic Scan (2017)
- Limited Wars – Arab Israeli Conflict (under publication)

Articles

- Battle for supremacy
- Nothing is ever lasting
- Go in for caliberated response,
- Having car-free roads on Sundays
- Two shades of autumn
- Passing on
- The Prez who wanted to be a billionaire.
- Engaging China : need to mind the imperatives.
- Checkmating the Dragon's Growing Influence

He presented a keynote conference address on Using Military Veterans to add value to developmental initiatives in Rural and Semi-Urban Areas on 6 May 2014 at Observer Research Foundation.

He has delivered lectures at Boston University and presented a paper at International Journal of Arts & Sciences (IJAS) held at Harvard Medical School in May 2015.
