= Murder of Jaswinder Kaur Sidhu =

Canadian murder victim

Jaswinder Kaur Sidhu
- Born: 4 August 1975; Maple Ridge, British Columbia, Canada
- Died: 8 June 2000 (aged 24); Ludhiana, Punjab, India
- Cause of death: Murder by slashing
- Known for: Honor Killing victim

Jaswinder Kaur "Jassi" Sidhu (August 4, 1975 – June 8, 2000) was an Indo-Canadian beautician who was murdered in an honour killing near the villages of Kaunke and Khosa area of Ludhiana, Punjab, India, after travelling from British Columbia, Canada. She was kidnapped, tortured, and killed on orders of her mother, Malkiat Kaur Sidhu, and uncle, Surjit Singh Badesha, as punishment for her clandestine wedding.

== Background ==
Jaswinder "Jassi" Kaur was born and raised in Maple Ridge, British Columbia. Her wealthy family was headed by her uncle, Surjit Singh Badesha, in the Fraser Valley, after migrating from Punjab, India. She graduated from Pitt Meadows Secondary School in 1993.

On a visit to the city of Jagraon in the Punjab state of India in December 1994, Jassi met and fell in love with Sukhwinder Singh Sidhu (nicknamed "Mithoo"), a rickshaw driver. They kept in contact over the next four years. In 1999, Jassi made another trip to India with her family, the purpose of which was arranging a marriage for her. Sukhwinder claimed that he used to bring sleeping pills, and Jassi's sympathetic aunt would mix them with the food at dinnertime and make sure everybody was fast asleep. Sukhwinder would jump over the wall and enter into the house after 11 p.m. and meet Jassi in her room.

Jassi and Sukhwinder married secretly on March 15, 1999 in a gurdwara. She did not reveal her marriage to her family, although she continued to write to Sukhwinder and send him money.

A year later, her family discovered the marriage through relatives in India. They strongly disapproved of this marriage because the husband was from Jassi's mother's village and belonged to the same Sidhu clan.

They attempted to persuade her to get a divorce by first offering to buy her a car and material possessions, and then by beating her. After those attempts failed, her family pressured her into signing documentation, falsely telling her that it was legal paperwork which would help Sukhwinder come to Canada. Instead, the document contained criminal accusations against Sukhwinder. When Jassi discovered this, she contacted Indian officials, stating that the accusations were false and she was coerced into signing them.

After this, her family forcefully took her back to Canada, where she was held under confinement in the family home.

== Kidnapping and murder ==
Jassi escaped from family confinement with the help of the Royal Canadian Mounted Police, who escorted her from the residence. She obtained money from a friend to buy a plane ticket, and flew to India on May 12, 2000, to reunite with Sukhwinder. On June 8, Jassi and Sukhwinder were kidnapped by hitmen hired by her uncle. Sukhwinder was violently beaten, while Jassi was taken to an abandoned farmhouse, where she was subsequently murdered. On June 9, 2000, her body was found dumped in an irrigation canal 45 kilometres (28 mi) from Kaonke Khosa. Her throat had been slit. An investigation by the Indian Police showed that the killers were in contact with her mother and uncle by phone, and it was determined that the order to kill Jassi was given by her mother. Her mother and uncle were arrested on January 6, 2012.

== Investigation and aftermath ==
The local hitmen involved in the killing were arrested, tried and convicted, the result of an aggressive investigation by Inspector Swaran Singh. Attempts were made to extradite Malkiat Kaur Sidhu and Surjit Singh Badesha from Canada to India to stand trial, but the process was stalled owing to British Columbian court proceedings and Canadian extradition laws. When pressed for information at the time, the Royal Canadian Mounted Police, Canadian Foreign Affairs and the Department of Justice stated that the file remained active and extradition was still being considered.

Sukhwinder was accused of rape in August 2004 and incarcerated in the Ludhiana Central Jail for four years, until he was acquitted. The woman who made the false accusation was found to have connections to Jassi Sidhu's family. Harbinder Sewak, the publisher of the South Asian Post newspaper in Vancouver, BC, intervened on behalf of Sukhwinder, hiring a legal team for him. The newspaper was recognised for its crusading journalism through a Jack Webster Award for Best Community Reporting in 2008 for this action. After his acquittal, Sukhwinder was elected panch of Kaunke Khosa. The rape charge, and additional charges of drug smuggling, against Sukhwinder were later recommended for cancellation by Justice Mehtab Singh Gill. However, he faces additional drug charges and has spend 3 years in jail before securing bail.

After a decade-long investigation, Jassi's mother and uncle were arrested by the RCMP on January 6, 2012 – almost twelve years after Jassi's murder.

Darshan Singh Sidhu, one of the men who was earlier convicted of Jassi's murder but later acquitted in India after an appeal, was given permanent residency in Canada in 2008, having lied about his criminal status on his immigration application. He was later declared inadmissible in Canada after his criminal past was revealed.

=== Extradition of Badesha and Sidhu ===
On May 9, 2014, following court proceedings in the Supreme Court of British Columbia, Justice Gregory Finch ordered Surjit Badesha and Malkit Sidhu to be turned over to Indian police to face trial. This motion effectively ended the debate regarding their extradition, which had been stalled by the pair arguing that enough evidence was not present to extradite. Finch justified his decision by showing evidence that India had presented against Badesha, including 266 telephone calls between Badesha and the four men convicted of killing Jassi. Justice Finch also reminded those present at the trial that "it is the Canadian court's role to determine whether a jury could convict based on the evidence, not whether they should convict."

On 24 January 2019, they were both extradited and arrived in Delhi, India to face the charges.

As of June 2025, the trial of Badesha and Sidhu is ongoing, with both defendants free on bail granted during the COVID-19 pandemic.

== Coverage ==
The story of Jassi and Sukhwinder is the subject of Murder Unveiled, a made-for-TV movie. A petition website, 'Justice for Jassi,' archiving her story and dedicated to obtaining justice for her has been signed by thousands of people worldwide. A book by the same name, Justice for Jassi, written by Province, from Deputy Editor Fabian Dawson, The Tribune Special Correspondent Jupinderjit Singh and South Asian Post publisher Harbinder Sewak, was released at the end of 2011, just before her mother and uncle were charged. This murder case was also featured in CBC Television's "Jassi Sidhu murder : Escape from Justice (2012)" on The Fifth Estate. It was covered by an NBC A Dateline Special "Forbidden Love" August 27, 2002.

Present at the final court proceedings of Badesha and Sidhu was Jim Longridge, the former principal of the high school Jassi Sidhu had attended in Pitt Meadows. Remembering Sidhu as a quiet, friendly and studious girl, Longridge was horrified to learn of her murder and had been persistently writing to various Canadian politicians and police over the years, demanding action on her murder overseas. It was also featured on the Global Television Network's news magazine Crime Beat.

Dear Jassi, a film about the incident by Tarsem Singh, premiered and won in the Platform Prize program at the 2023 Toronto International Film Festival.

== See also ==
- List of kidnappings
- South Asian Canadians in British Columbia
- Surjit Athwal
