= Nishi Chaturvedi =

Epidemiologist and researcher

- Education: University of London
- Scientific career
- Workplaces: Imperial College London; University College London
- Thesis: Hypertension, hypertensive end organ damage, diabetes and coronary heart disease in Afro-Caribbeans in the UK (1994)

Nishi Chaturvedi OBE is a Professor of Clinical Epidemiology at University College London. Her research considers how ethnicity and lifestyle impact people's risk factors for disease. During the COVID-19 pandemic, Chaturvedi explained that the increased mortality rate for people from black and minority ethnic backgrounds was due to societal inequality and how this intersects with healthcare.

== Early life and education ==
Chaturvedi studied medicine at the University of London and graduated in 1985. She specialised in public health and epidemiology, and completed a medical doctorate at Guy's and St Thomas' NHS Foundation Trust studying hypertension in Afro-Caribbean communities. Chaturvedi was a postdoctoral research associate at University College London, where she worked in the Department of Epidemiology.

== Research and career ==
In 2000 Chaturvedi was appointed Chair of Clinical Epidemiology in the National Heart and Lung Institute. She returned to University College London as Chair in Epidemiology in the Institute of Cardiovascular Sciences in 2014.

Chaturvedi studies the mechanisms of disease and modes of prevention of cardiovascular disease, with a focus on minority ethnic communities in the United Kingdom. She leads the Southall and Brent REvisited (SABRE) study, which has monitored the health of a 5,000 person cohort of Europeans, South Asians and African Caribbeans in London for over twenty years. SABRE started in 1988, when the first generation of South Asian and African Caribbeans in the United Kingdom were approaching middle-age. It investigated the risk of stroke, diabetes and heart disease amongst participants, and helped to inform medical guidelines. Chaturvedi showed that the high levels of hypertension only started when migrants moved from the Caribbean or West Africa to the United Kingdom; meaning that these levels were due to lifestyle, rather than genetic selection. In 2008, Chaturvedi re-visited the study, analysing how the health of the original cohort had changed over time. In 2012 the SABRE study observed that by the age of eighty, twice as many South Asians and African Caribbeans members of the cohort had developed diabetes compared to the European group. Whilst a risk factor for diabetes in family history, Chaturvedi explained that this alone could not explain the overrepresentation of diabetes amongst South Asian and African Caribbean populations. Instead, SABRE showed that healthy eating and an active lifestyle was crucial in avoiding risk of disease (in particular heart disease and Type 2 diabetes). She went on to study the evolution of HBA1c, a modified form of Haemoglobin A1c, changed as Type 2 diabetes progressed, and how this progression might be related to gender and ethnicity. Chaturvedi made use of data from the UK Biobank to monitor how levels of HBA1c are related to other long-term conditions, including dementia and cancer, as well as how these complications may be linked to ethnicity or gender.

Chaturvedi is part of the Non-Communicable Disease (NCD) Risk Factor Collaboration (NCD-RisC), a worldwide network of medical researchers that look to better understand risk factors in different countries.

During the COVID-19 pandemic, it emerged that in the UK, people from black and minority ethnic backgrounds were disproportionately suffering from COVID-19. Writing for The Guardian, Chaturvedi explained that could be due to several reasons, including that the United Kingdom's outbreak of COVID-19 started in London, the most diverse city in the country, and that co-morbidities (e.g. conditions such as hypertension) could be significant prognostic factors. Ultimately, Chaturvedi argued that healthcare inequality, and the close relationship between socio-economic status and clinical outcome in the UK, was contributing to the increased mortality rates for people from black and minority ethnic backgrounds. Ethnic minorities are more likely to be employed in 'essential' high-risk sectors, including transport and healthcare, and live in multi-generational, densely populated households. She explained that the differences in clinical outcome for people from black and minority ethnic backgrounds was not due to genetics; "Ethnicity is a complex socio-cultural construct, it's not a biology construct. There's no gene for being Asian. There's no gene for being black,". She developed a survey for members of the SABRE cohort to better understand the prevalence of coronavirus disease and its impact on black and minority ethnic communities.

Chaturvedi was appointed Officer of the Order of the British Empire (OBE) in the 2023 New Year Honours for services to medical research.

== Selected publications ==
- Chaturvedi, N; McKeigue, P M; Marmot, M G (July 1993). "Resting and ambulatory blood pressure differences in Afro-Caribbeans and Europeans". Hypertension. 22 (1): 90–96. doi:10.1161/01.HYP.22.1.90. PMID 8319998. Wikidata ()
- Chaturvedi, N; McKeigue, P M (1 April 1994). "Methods for epidemiological surveys of ethnic minority groups". Journal of Epidemiology & Community Health. 48 (2): 107–111. doi:10.1136/JECH.48.2.107. PMC 1059916. PMID 8189161. Wikidata ()
- Chaturvedi, N.; Stephenson, J. M.; Fuller, J. H. (1 June 1995). "The Relationship Between Smoking and Microvascular Complications in the EURODIAB IDDM Complications Study". Diabetes Care. 18 (6): 785–792. doi:10.2337/DIACARE.18.6.785. PMID 7555504. S2CID 38611198. Wikidata ()
