= Abhay Kumar Dubey =

Indian journalist and writer

- Occupation: scholar-journalist

Abhay Kumar Dubey is an Indian journalist and writer.

Dubey is the author of 'Bharat Mein Rajniti-Kal Aur Aaj', 'World-famous Great Treasures'

== List of Books ==
- Bharat Mein Rajniti-Kal Aur Aaj
- World Famous Great Treasures
- Rajneeti Ki Kitab
- Rastvad Ka Ayodhya Kand
- Bharat Ka Bhoomandalikaran
- Unsolved Mysteries
- Rahasya
- Adventures
