= Ira Trivedi =

Indian writer

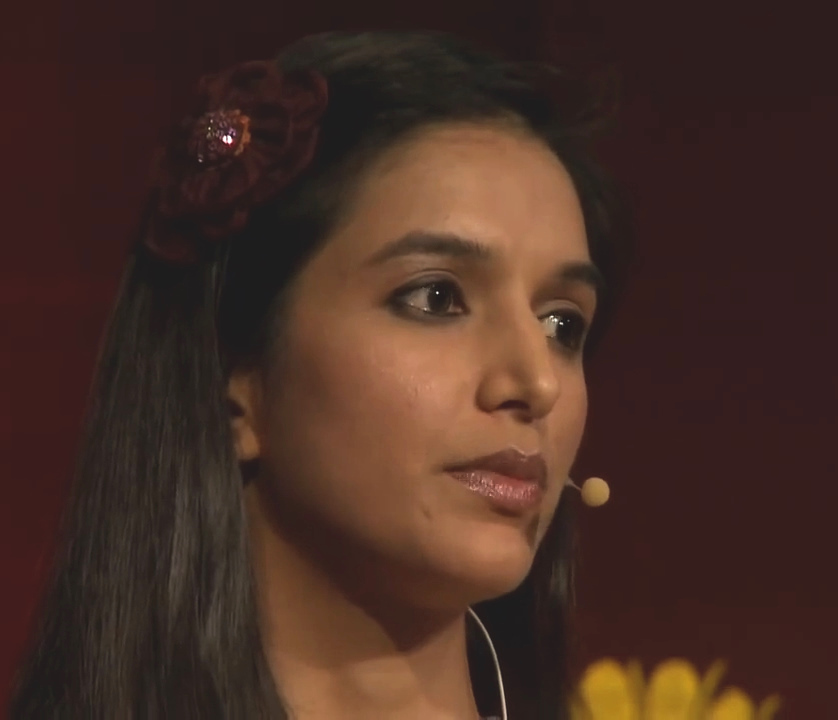
- Trivedi at the 2012 TED@Bangalore Talent Search conference
- Born: 1984 (age 41–42); Lucknow, Uttar Pradesh, India
- Education: Wellesley College (BA); Columbia University (MBA)
- Occupations: Author, columnist, yoga teacher
- Spouse: Madhu Mantena (m. 2023)
- Writing career
- Genres: Fiction and nonfiction
- Website: www.iratrivedi.in

Ira Trivedi is an Indian author, columnist, and yoga teacher. She writes both fiction and nonfiction, often on issues related to women and gender in India. Her works include India in Love: Marriage and Sexuality in the 21st Century, What Would You Do to Save the World?, The Great Indian Love Story, and There's No Love on Wall Street.

== Early life and education ==
Trivedi was born in Lucknow, India. Her grandmother is author Kranti Trivedi.

Trivedi began practising yoga while she was a student at Wellesley College. Trivedi graduated from Wellesley College in 2006 with a degree in economics. She has an MBA from Columbia University.

She completed Acharya training from the Sivananda Yoga Vedanta Centre.

== Career ==
Based on her experience with the Miss India beauty pageant, Trivedi wrote her debut fiction novel, What Would You Do To Save the World?: Confessions of a Could-Have-Been Beauty Queen, at age 19, which was described by a Deccan Herald book review as "An entertaining first novel which reveals the dust behind the diamonds, the tears behind the plastic smiles, and dishes the dirt on what really goes on behind the scenes of a beauty pageant."

The Great Indian Love Story was published in 2009, and described in The Hindu as "set in modern-day India where materialistic pleasures rule over emotions," and "a concoction of love, sex, revenge, friendship, power and crime." She later worked to develop the novel into a film.

Her 2011 fiction novel, There’s No Love On Wall Street, featured investment bankers, and Ahmed Faiyaz writes in a review for the Deccan Herald, "Ira tells it like it is with this one. It’s for those who want to take off the rose-tinted glasses and see the things as they are, without the pretense and floss that comes with it." In a review for DNA, Jayeeta Mazumder writes the protagonist "remains a confused 'Indian' who hates her 'Indianness', is a sucker for the high life and her final redemption through writing is almost forced. But the microscopic look at banking is severely convincing."

In 2014, Trivedi wrote an essay titled "Love Me Do," published in Outlook, that according to Firstpost, claimed "India is in the throes of a major sexual revolution." It was part of the beginning of her nonfiction book, India in Love: Marriage and Sexuality in the 21st century, for which she was traveling and conducting interviews. According to Gargi Gupta of DNA India, Trivedi spoke "to students in schools and colleges across India, couples – married, on the verge of it, living in, or of the same sex – their parents and guardians, marriage counsellors, astrologers, divorce lawyers and moral vigilantes to give a comprehensive picture of this revolution that's lifting the veil on many centuries of repression." Sumana Mukherjee wrote for Mint that after the 2012 Delhi gang rape and murder, the book, "the first home-grown pop-sociological take on the "sexual revolution" — was a matter of time." During her book launch in Chennai, Trivedi stated, "When I saw the outrage after the Delhi gang rape, I knew we were heading somewhere. There were hundreds of people, young women protesting on the streets, there were fathers taking their daughters to protests. The increase in the number of such cases after that is only a symptom of things coming out of the closet."

In 2016, she published a book of short stories, titled Gumrah: 11 Short Teen Crime Stories, based on the television series Gumrah: End of Innocence, and in 2017 published the novel Nikhil and Riya. In 2017, she published The 10 Minute Yoga Solution, described by IANS as "an apt manual for all those who are yet to foray in to the vedic practice" and "equally significant for practitioners".

She co-authored the book The Desi Guide to Dating with Sachin Bhatia, which was released in 2019. Amrita Paul of SheThePeople.TV wrote the book "addresses the often misogynist outlook the society holds when it comes to women dating vs men and gives a balanced perspective on dating."

In 2020, she released Om the Yoga Dog, a book for children described by The Indian Express as "a fun and interesting way to get kids to practice yoga," and by Soma Basu of The Hindu as "a simple stepwise guide to children on Yoga, with easy asanas and beneficial breathing techniques."

She is the founder of Namami Yoga, a non-profit organisation, the mobile app Ira Yoga Wellness, and Yog Love, an online yoga studio. She has written for The Hindu, Deccan Chronicle, The Telegraph, the Times of India, and Outlook. Trivedi speaks often on issues of gender, women and youth.

== Personal life ==
On 11 June, 2023, Trivedi married film producer Madhu Mantena in Mumbai which was attended by close family and friends.

== Works ==
- What Would You Do To Save the World (2006, Penguin Books)
- The Great Indian Love Story (2009, Penguin Books)
- There's No Love On Wall Street (2011, Penguin Books)
- India in Love: Marriage and Sexuality in the 21st Century (2014, Aleph Book Company)
- Gumrah: 11 Short Teen Crime Stories (2016)
- Nikhil and Riya (2017)
- The 10 Minute Yoga Solution (2017, Harper Collins)
- The Desi Guide to Dating (2019)
- Om the Yoga Dog (2020, Puffin)

== Awards ==
In 2015, Trivedi won the Devi Award for dynamism and innovation. That same year, she was awarded a UK Media Award for best investigative article dealing with bride trafficking in India.

In 2017, Trivedi was chosen as one of the "BBC's 100 most influential women in the world. “

== See also ==
- List of Indian writers
