= Neha Dubey =

Indian psychotherapist and former actress

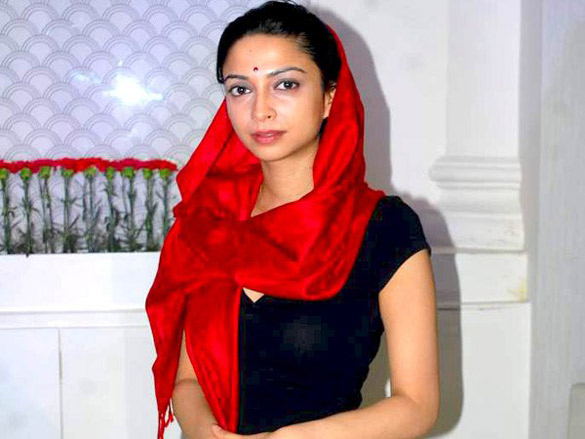
- Born: Ahmedabad, India
- Occupations: Psychoanalytic psychotherapist, actress
- Mother: Lilette Dubey
- Relatives: Ira Dubey (sister); Lushin Dubey (aunt)

Neha Dubey is an Indian psychotherapist based in Mumbai and former actress who occasionally appears in Hindi theatre and films.

== Biography ==
Dubey was born in Ahmedabad to Lillete Dubey and is married to Ravi. She has one sister, Ira Dubey, who is also an actress.

=== Career as psychiatric counselor ===
Dubey trained at the Regent's College School of Psychotherapy in London. She then worked at Guy's Hospital and the Psychotherapy Center of London Association of Counsellors and Psychotherapists (LACAP) in London. She now has a private practice in Worli, Mumbai.

=== Career as actress ===
From her days in high school and college, Dubey acted bit roles, almost all of them uncredited, in plays staged by Primetime Theatre Company, the troupe to which her mother Lillete Dubey belonged. It was while she was a student of psychiatry in London that Neha made her major theatre debut. She appeared in the West End as Olivia in Stephen Beresford's production of Shakespeare's Twelfth Night. During her time in London, she played several minor roles for TV and films where Indian/Asian characters were called for. These included a number of independent films, including Monsoon Wedding, Bow Barracks Forever and Manasarovar.

== Filmography ==
Year	Film	Role	Language	Notes
2001	Monsoon Wedding	Ayesha Verma	Hindi, English	
2003	The Perfect Husband		Hindi, Punjabi, English	
2003	Munnabhai M.B.B.S.	Shalini	Hindi	
2004	Manasarovar		Hindi, Marathi, Malayalam, English	
2004	Sau Jhooth Ek Sach	Zoya	Hindi	
2004	Bow Barracks Forever	Anne	Hindi, English, Bengali	
2005	Bye Bye Miss Goodnight	Niramala	Hindi	
2006	My Bollywood Bride	Alisha	Hindi, English	
