= Holipura =

- Village
- Location in Uttar Pradesh, India Holipura (India)
- Coordinates: 26.897°N 78.507°E
- Country: India
- State: Uttar Pradesh
- District: Agra

Government
  - Type: Monarchy (Chaturvedi family)
  - Body: Gram Panchayat

Population (2011)
  - Total: 8,000

Languages
  - Official: Hindi
- Time zone: UTC+5:30 (IST)
- PIN: 283113
- Nearest city: Agra
- Literacy: 90%
- Lok Sabha constituency: Fatepur Sikari
- Vidhan Sabha constituency: Bah
- Civic agency: Gram Panchayat

Holipura is a small village in Uttar Pradesh, India. It had a population of about 8000 people until 2011. River Yamuna is about 2 km from the village. Holipura is also famous for its education sports centre. The Haldhar Gate is one of the most notable places in the village. This was built by a late ruler of the village and was passed down to today's Chaturvedi Family. There are four families living in the Haldhar Gate.

Holipura has a recorded history of 500 years. It was ruled by the prosperous Chaturvedi family for hundreds of years. The village is named after Shri Holi SIngh Chaturvedi, its founder. It is declared as a Heritage village for tourists. 38 properties are identified of heritage value. Every individual is required to contribute towards heritage history of the village and its heritage buildings. Indrajeet Bhavan's photograph as heritage prime property is published in Dainik Jagran dated 28 November 2011.

== Notable people ==
Holipura was the seat of a great saint swami Hari Hara Nandji who lived for three decades. Member of Parliament Shri Shambhu Nath Chaturvedi, 1977, the first Police Commissioner of Delhi and DGP Uttar Pradesh, Shri J.N. Chaturvedi, Shri Bishambhar Nath Chaturvedi ( longest serving President of Calcutta Stock Exchange). Shri Satish Chandra Chaturvedi rose to be the founder chairman of Sharda Gramin Bank, ushering in the concept of regional rural banks in India. Mr Ashvini Chaturvedi recorded his name in the history by being a part of the Indian Cricket team. Mr Dhananjay Chaturvedi made his mark in the corporate world and became first Indian head of the German global giants the Miele (India) Ltd. The Chaturvedis of this small village on the banks of Yamuna river have made their name across the globe.
