= Kranti Trivedi =

Indian writer (1930–2009)

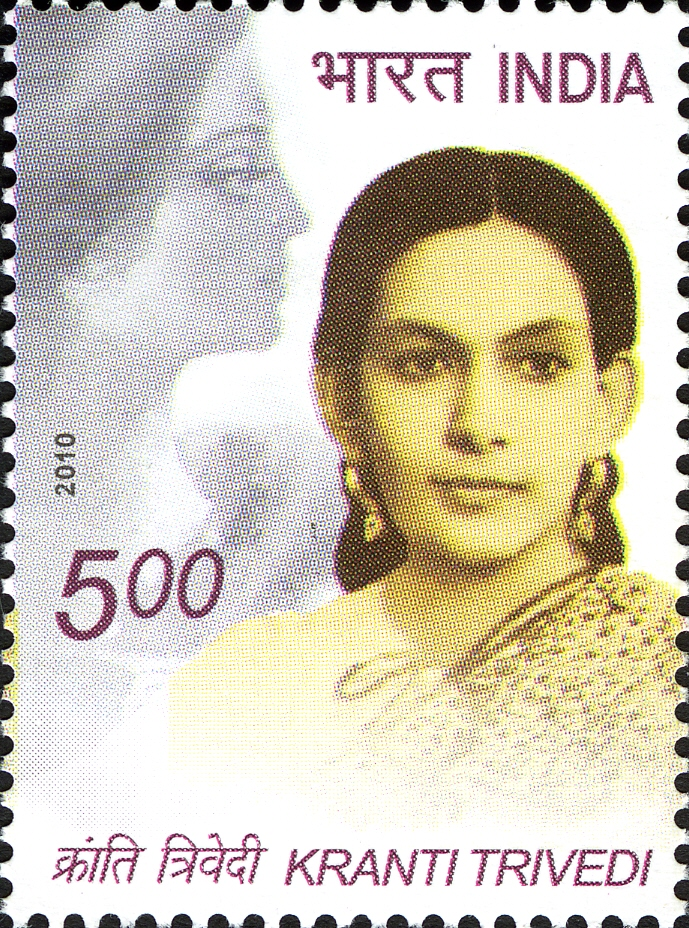
- Born: Kranti Trivedi; 28 September 1930; Raipur, India
- Died: 26 October 2009 (aged 79); New Delhi, India
- Occupation: Hindi author
- Relatives: Ira Trivedi (granddaughter)
- Writing career
- Genres: Hindi novels, Hindi children's stories, Hindi poems
- Notable works: Chir Kalyani, Anokha Arohi

Kranti Trivedi (28 September 1930 – 26 October 2009) was one of the most prolific Hindi language writers of the 20th century.

== Biography ==
Smt. Kranti Trivedi was born on 28 September 1930 in Raipur (Chhattisgarh), in the family of Pt. Ravishankar Shukla, the first Chief Minister of Madhya Pradesh. She exhibited her writing skills in different forms of literature through simple language and interesting subject matter in order to arouse spontaneous interest as well as to inspire the readers to read more of Hindi literature.

Simplicity of language, easy flow and contextual relevance of the subject matter in her writings were evident in stories published in popular Hindi magazines such as Saptahik Hindustan, Dharmyug, Kadambani, Navneet, Sarika, etc. Her most successful and popular story titled 'Phoolon Ko Kya Ho Gaya' has established its separate identity as being one of the first ones to be included in the manifestation programme of the internet. Propagation of Hindi and issues relating to women were the two cornerstones of all her writings.

The first six novels of Smt. Kranti Trivedi have proved to be milestones in creating interest in Hindi and as well as propagating Hindi literature. Later in mythological novels, she highlighted the varied emotions of a woman. Shagun Pakshi, Krishna Paksha, Amrit Ghat, Mohbhang, Bun Bund Amrit, and Aathvan Janma are her powerful social novels in which the problems of women have been raised with great empathy. During her lifetime, she brought out more than 40 books and left behind five unpublished manuscripts. One such unpublished manuscript, 'Lata aur Vriksha,' was recently published and released by Chief Minister of Delhi on 29 October 2010. Prior to that, another unpublished manuscript, 'Muskarati Ladki,' was published and released in Lucknow by the Governor of Uttar Pradesh.

The story Phoolon Ka Sapna is a story of redressal of the issues related to caste discrimination. In the novel 'Ashesh,' the role of Zamindars in the freedom movement has been adduced. In 'Agam' clashes between eastern and western cultures have been described emphasizing harmony being established between these two cultures. The novel 'Main ur Mera Samay' is a biography of her father Pt. Ravi Shankar Shukla told in first person. 'Atishikshan' is a compilation of poems infused with spontaneous feelings. 'Patte ki Nav,' 'Mithee Boli,' 'Peeli Haveli,' and 'Kut KutChuha,' Nanhe Jasoos' are her popular stories for the children. While being natural, simple, interesting and touching, all her works contain valuable message for humanity.

Smt. Kranti Trivedi has received many awards like Hindi Sevi Samman for the year 2002 and she was conferred "Pandit Deen Dayal Upadhayaya Puruskar" for 2002 by Uttar Pradesh Sansthan of the Government of Uttar Pradesh. She was also awarded 'Rashtriya Hindi Sewa Millennium Samman' by UNESCO and 'Nari Lekhan Puruskar' by Rashtra Bhasha Prachar Samiti of the Government of Madhya Pradesh. In 2010 the Indian government issued a commemorative stamp in her honor.

=== Noted novels ===
- Anokha Arohi Kasrawad (2003)
- Bhoomija (1996)
- Gangadutt (1998)
- Aathvaa Janam (1998)
- Agam
- Chir Kalyani (1994)
- Atithi Kshan (1985)
- Bahe Sau Ganga
- Uttaraadhikari
- Raghavpriy Radhika Mohbhang
- Krishnapaksh
- Amritghat
- Sagunpanchi
- Pholon ka Sapna
- Tapasvini
