= Dwivedi =

Dwivedi, or Dubey, or Dube, or Dwivedula is a Hindu Brahmin surname.

== Notable people ==
- Brahm Dutt Dwivedi – Politician
- Chandraprakash Dwivedi – Indian film director and script writer
- Divya Dwivedi - Philosopher
- Dushyant Dubey - Social worker
- Major General G. G. Dwivedi
- Hazari Prasad Dwivedi – Hindi novelist
- Janardan Dwivedi – Politician
- Kapil Deva Dwivedi – Sanskrit scholar
- Mahavir Prasad Dwivedi – Indian writer
- Manilal Dwivedi (1858–1898) – Gujarati writer
- Nikhil Dwivedi – Bollywood actor
- O. P. Dwivedi – Political scientist
- Prakash Dwivedi – Indian politician
- Ragini Dwivedi – Kannada actress and model
- Ram Chandra Dwivedi – (AKA Kavi Pradeep) – Poet and songwriter
- Ramola Dubey, Religious writer
- Rewa Prasad Dwivedi – Sanskrit scholar and poet
- Satyendra Dubey- Murdered Indian highway official
- Seema Dwivedi – Indian politician
- Sharada Dwivedi – Historian
- Sudhakara Dwivedi – Mathematician
- Major Sunil Dutt Dwivedi – Indian politician
- General Upendra Dwivedi - Indian Army chief

== See also ==
- Trivedi, meaning versed in three vedas
