= The Perfect Husband (2003 film) =

The Perfect Husband (2003)
- Directed by: Priya Singh Paul
- Written by: Priya Singh Paul; Pramod Singh
- Produced by: Priya Singh Paul; S. Chander
- Starring: Parvin Dabas; Neha Dubey; Sinia Duggal; Amin Hajee; Pavan Malhotra; William Randall; Rajeshwari Sachdev
- Cinematography: Dharam Gulati
- Edited by: Sanjib Dutta
- Music by: Sukhwinder Singh; Sanjoy Chowdhary
- Distributed by: Eros International; Fox Star Studios
- Release date: 2003
- Running time: 110 minutes
- Country: India
- Languages: English, Hindi, Punjabi

The Perfect Husband is the debut feature film of Priya Singh Paul, an Indian-Jewish filmmaker. Trained in filmmaking in India and the US, she has built a considerable reputation for herself in India's competitive and demanding television scene. The film, a romantic comedy cum social satire, predominantly in English with a smattering of Hindi and Punjabi, is a modern and thought-provoking look at the Indian marriage 'game' – the quest for the only security symbol that most Indian women possess: a husband, perfect or otherwise!

The film was invited to the Palm Springs International Film Festival in January 2003 and shown at the Cannes Film Festival in May 2004.

== Plot ==
The Perfect Husband is the beautiful story of Jaya [21], who, inspired by the Shakespearean ideal of "the marriage of true minds" and heavily influenced by the American trend of "finding your own mate," rebels against tradition and family. She sets out to find a man who truly loves and values her – one who does not treat her like a vassal meant only to satisfy his needs, like some men do !

And it is the story of Uma [30] who resolves never to marry any willing, over the hill man, just because her family believes that an unsuitable alliance is better than no alliance at all !

The film is a funny, sad, satirical, serious, compassionate, and wicked revelation of the follies and foibles of a society that considers the birth of a girl "a curse," where abuse by the husband is taken for granted, and a woman's worth is judged by three factors alone—that she be married by the age of 25, that she should amply satisfy the monetary demands of her in-laws, and that she produce a male heir within a year of holy matrimony!

The film, a romantic comedy cum social satire, predominantly in English with a smattering of Hindi and Punjabi, is a modern and thought-provoking look at the Indian marriage 'game' – the quest for the only security symbol that most Indian women possess: a husband, perfect or otherwise! The Perfect Husband is the beautiful story of Jaya [21], who, inspired by the Shakespearean ideal of "the marriage of true minds" and heavily influenced by the American trend of "finding your own mate" rebels against tradition and family. She sets out to find a man who truly loves and values her – one who does not treat her like a vassal meant only to satisfy his needs as some men do !

And it is the story of Uma [30] who resolves never to marry any willing, over-the-hill man, just because her family believes that an unsuitable alliance is better than no alliance at all !

== Cast ==
- Parvin Dabas
- Neha Dubey
- Sinia Duggal
- Amin Hajee
- Pavan Malhotra
- Will Randall
- Rajeshwari Sachdev

== Soundtrack ==
The Perfect Husband's songs are composed by Sukhwinder Singh and Times Music acquired the music rights of the film.

=== Track listing ===
The Perfect Husband (Original Motion Picture Soundtrack)
No.	Title	Singer(s)	Length
1.	"Mahiya Ve"	Shweta Pandit, Sukhwinder Singh	03:45
2.	"Pardesia"	Shweta Pandit, Sukhwinder Singh	03:34
3.	"Rang De"	Shweta Pandit, Sukhwinder Singh	04:40
4.	"Mavaan Tetiyan"	Rajeshwari Sachdev	04:44
5.	"Daachi Valeya"	Sukhwinder Singh	03:52
6.	"Pardesia (Remix)"	Shweta Pandit, Sukhwinder Singh	04:30
7.	"Rang De (Remix)"	Shweta Pandit, Sukhwinder Singh	04:26
8.	"Teri Seva (Morning Ardaas)"	Raagi Gurucharan Singh	05:01
9.	"Laanva Phera (Marriage Song)"	Raagi Gurucharan Singh	06:36
Total length:			41:08
