= Dushyant Dubey =

Indian social activist

Dushyant Dubey, also known as St Broseph, is an Indian social activist and RTI activist.

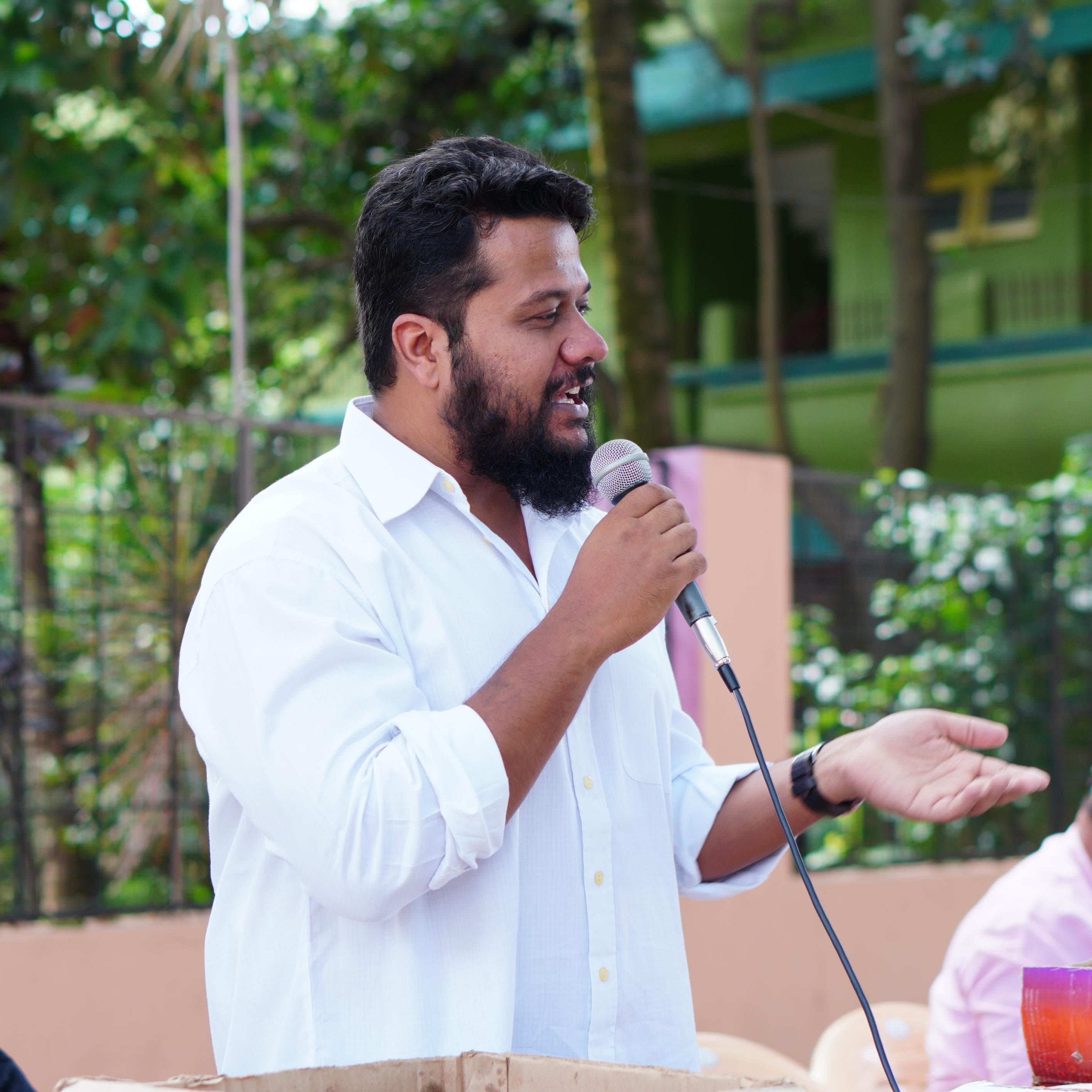
Dushyant Dubey talking to students of Resurrection School, Indiranagar on 9 August 2023, his birthday.

== Career ==
In 2008, Dubey attracted coverage for his attempts to help a 19-year-old American man named Abraham Briggs who was committing suicide in front of over 1,000 online users. Dubey called the Miami police, however, Briggs was dead before officials arrived at the scene. In 2019, Dubey hosted a show on YouTube.

In 2020, Dubey helped people seeking help on Reddit over COVID-19 pandemic in India. Later on, he started providing help to the people on the same forum over a range of other issues. In 2022, he organised wall painting project Freedom Wall for depicting historical Indian personalities.

As of 2024, Dubey, also known as St Broseph, has expanded his volunteer organisation to include more than 6,000 volunteers with chapters in Bengaluru, Hyderabad, and Chennai.
