= Urmila Matondkar filmography =

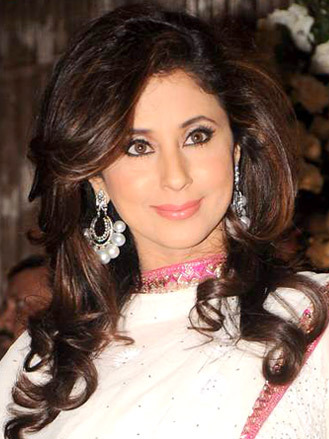
Matondkar in 2012

Urmila Matondkar is an Indian actress known for her work in Hindi films. She has appeared in over 60 films. She has been praised by the critics for her acting and dancing skills. She made her screen debut as a child artist in B.R. Chopra's Karm (1977), and later appeared in Shekhar Kapur's highly acclaimed Masoom (1983). In 1991, she acted in the critically acclaimed film Dacait.

After making her debut as the heroine in 1989 Malayalam thriller Chanakyan, Urmila began a full-time acting career, with a leading role in the 1991 action Narsimha. She rose to prominence with Ram Gopal Varma's blockbuster Rangeela (1995) Which Marked Her Breakthrough Role . Her portrayal of an aspiring actress, Mili Joshi, opposite Aamir Khan received praise from critics, and garnered her first nomination for the Filmfare Award for Best Actress.

In 1997, Urmila received a nomination for Filmfare Award for Best Supporting Actress for her performance in the drama Judaai. The following year, she starred in the crime drama Satya, which has been cited as one of the greatest films of Indian cinema, for which she received another nomination for Best Actress. The same year, her dance performance in the item number "Chamma Chamma" from China Gate won her rave reviews. In 1999, she received praise for playing a psychopath in the thriller Kaun and a reserved girl in the romantic comedy Khoobsurat, a box office success. Her other four releases of the year including Jaanam Samjha Karo, and Hum Tum Pe Marte Hain were commercial failures. She played an obsessive lover in the 2001 romantic drama Pyaar Tune Kya Kiya, which earned her a nomination for the Filmfare Award for Best Performance in a Negative Role.

From 2003 to 2005, Urmila starred in six consecutive films that garnered her widespread critical acclaim. In 2003, she played a possessed woman in the commercially successful horror film Bhoot, which won her the Filmfare Critics Award for Best Actress. Later the same year, she starred in the drama Tehzeeb and the period drama Pinjar, based on the partition of India. The role of a violent avenger in the 2004 neo-noir Ek Hasina Thi garnered her several Best Actress nominations, including Filmfare. In 2005, she starred in the horror Naina and the drama Maine Gandhi Ko Nahin Mara. This was followed by a series of commercial failures, including Speed (2007), and Karzzzz (2008). Her first leading role in Marathi cinema came with the 2014 drama Ajoba, in which she played a wildlife photographer. In addition to her acting career, she has featured as a talent judge for Sony TV's Jhalak Dikhhla Jaa Season 2, Colors' Chak Dhoom Dhoom and Zee Marathi's Dance Maharashtra Dance.

== Films ==
Year	Title	Role	Language	Notes	Ref.
1977	Karm	Ajay	Hindi	Child artiste	
1980	Zaakol	Shona	Marathi	Child artiste	
1981	Kalyug	Parikshit	Hindi	Child artiste	
1983	Masoom	Pinky	Hindi	Child artiste	
1984	Bhavna		Hindi	Child artiste	
1985	Sur Sangam		Hindi	Child artiste	
1987	Dacait	Shanta Yadav	Hindi	Young adult	
1988	Tumhare Sahare		Hindi	Young adult	
1988	Oh Bharya Katha	Neeraja	Telugu	Young adult	
1989	Bade Ghar Ki Beti	Pushpa	Hindi	Young adult	
1989	Chanakyan	Renu	Malayalam	Debut as lead actress	
1991	Narsimha	Meenu Singh	Hindi		
1992	Chamatkar	Mala	Hindi		
1992	Antham	Bhavana	Telugu		
1992	Drohi	Bhavna	Hindi		
1993	Shreemaan Aashique	Shaku	Hindi		
1993	Gaayam	Chitra	Telugu		
1993	Bedardi	Honey	Hindi		
1994	Kanoon	Shalu	Hindi		
1994	Aa Gale Lag Ja	Roshni	Hindi		
1994	Money Money	Chitra	Telugu	Special appearance in song "Paadu Kaburu Vinagaane"	
1995	Rangeela	Mili Joshi	Hindi	Nominated—Filmfare Award for Best Actress	
1995	Thacholi Varghese Chekavar	Maya	Malayalam		
1996	Indian	Sapna	Tamil		
1997	Judaai	Janhvi Sahni	Hindi	Nominated—Filmfare Award for Best Supporting Actress	
1997	Anaganaga Oka Roju	Madhu	Telugu		
1997	Daud	Bhavani	Hindi		
1997	Mere Sapno Ki Rani	Sapna	Hindi		
1997	Aflatoon	Pooja	Hindi		
1998	Satya	Vidya	Hindi	Nominated—Filmfare Award for Best Actress	
1998	China Gate	Dancer	Hindi	Special appearance in song "Chamma Chamma"	
1998	Kudrat	Madhu	Hindi		
1998	Chhota Chetan	Miss Hawa Hawai	Hindi		
1999	Kaun	Ma'am	Hindi		
1999	Jaanam Samjha Karo	Chandni	Hindi		
1999	Hum Tum Pe Marte Hain	Radhika	Hindi		
1999	Mast	Mallika	Hindi		
1999	Dillagi	Shalini	Hindi		
1999	Khoobsurat	Shivani	Hindi		
2000	Kunwara	Urmila Singh	Hindi		
2000	Jungle	Anu Malhotra	Hindi		
2000	Deewane	Sapna	Hindi		
2001	Pyaar Tune Kya Kiya	Ria	Hindi	Nominated—Filmfare Award for Best Performance in a Negative Role	
2001	Lajja	Dancer	Hindi	Special appearance in song "Aa Hi Jaiye"	
2002	Company	Dancer	Hindi	Special appearance in song "A Shot of Company"	
2002	Om Jai Jagadish	Nitu	Hindi		
2002	Deewangee	Sargam	Hindi		
2003	Bhoot	Swati	Hindi	Filmfare Critics Award for Best Actress; Nominated—Filmfare Award for Best Actress	
2003	Tehzeeb	Tehzeeb Mirza	Hindi		
2003	Pinjar	Puro/ Hamida (Note: Matondkar played a single character which had two different names.)	Hindi		
2004	Ek Hasina Thi	Sarika/ Swati	Hindi	Nominated—Filmfare Award for Best Actress	
2005	Naina	Naina	Hindi		
2005	Maine Gandhi Ko Nahin Mara	Trisha	Hindi	Nominated—Filmfare Award for Best Actress	
2006	Banaras	Shwetamabri	Hindi		
2006	Bas Ek Pal	Anamika	Hindi		
2007	Aag	Dancer	Hindi	Special appearance in 'Mehbooba Mehbooba'	
2007	Speed	Richa	Hindi		
2007	Om Shanti Om	Herself	Hindi	Special appearance in song "Deewangi Deewangi"	
2008	Karzzzz	Kaamini	Hindi		
2008	EMI	Prerana Joshi	Hindi		
2012	Hridayanath		Hindi	Special appearance in song "Yana Yana"	
2012	Delhi Safari	Begum	Hindi	Voiceover	
2013	Life Mein Hungama	Cameo	Hindi		
2014	Ajoba	Purva	Marathi		
2018	Blackmail	—	Hindi	Special appearance in song ''Bewafa Beauty''	

== Television ==
Year	Title	Role	Notes	Ref.
1986	Katha Sagar	Shikha/ Urmi		
1987	Zindagi	Vimla		
1989	Indradhanush	Bala's girlfriend		
1993–1995	Bible Ki Kahaniya	Noah Wife's Niece		
2007	Jhalak Dikhhla Jaa Season 2	Judge		
2008	Waar Parriwar	Host		
2011	Chak Dhoom Dhoom	Judge		
2011–2012	Marathi Paul Padte Pudhe Atkepar Zenda	Judge		
2012–2013	Dance Maharashtra Dance	Judge		
2022	DID Super Moms	Judge		

== See also ==
- List of awards and nominations received by Urmila Matondkar
