= List of awards and nominations received by Urmila Matondkar =

Urmila Matondkar awards and nominations
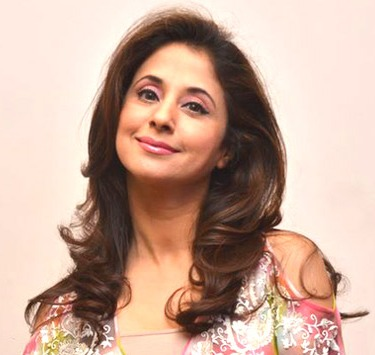
- Matondkar in 2012
Awards and nominations
Award	Wins	Nominations
Apsara Film & Television Producers Guild Award	1	3
Bollywood Movie Awards	3	3
Filmfare Awards	1	6
IIFA Awards	1	3
Screen Awards	1	3
Stardust Awards		1
Zee Cine Awards	1	4
Aisa Film Café Awards	0	1

Totals (Note: Certain award groups do not simply award one winner. They acknowledge several different recipients, have runners-up, and have third place. Since this is a specific recognition and is different from losing an award, runner-up mentions are considered wins in this award tally. For simplification and to avoid errors, each award in this list has been presumed to have had a prior nomination.)
- Wins: 10
- Nominations: 33

Urmila Matondkar (born 4 February 1974) is an Indian actress known for her work in Hindi cinema. She started her acting career as a child artiste in Kalyug (1980) and starred as the leading lady in the action Narsimha (1991). The successful romantic comedy Rangeela marked a turning point in her career, following which she received widespread praise for her performances, including the 1997 drama Judaai, the 1998 crime thriller Satya, the 1999 romantic comedy Khoobsurat, the 2000 thriller Jungle and the 2002 psychological romance Deewangee. She also achieved success in Telugu and Tamil cinema with starring roles in Antham (1992), Gaayam (1993), Indian (1996) and Anaganaga Oka Roju (1997). Matondkar garnered critical acclaim and commercial success with Kaun? (1999), Pyaar Tune Kya Kiya (2001), Bhoot(2003), for which she won a Filmfare Award for Best Actress (Critics), Tehzeeb (2003), Pinjar (2003), Ek Hasina Thi (2004), Naina (2005), Maine Gandhi Ko Nahin Mara (2005), Bas Ek Pal (2006) and the Marathi film Ajoba (2014). She is the recipient of numerous accolades, including a Filmfare Award, a Screen Award and a Nandi Award. She has also won an Apsara Award, three Bollywood Movie Awards and a Zee Cine Award.

Matondkar also received a special Achievement in Bollywood award at the Rajiv Gandhi Memorial Awards.

== Major awards ==
=== Asia Film Cafe Awards ===
The Asia Film Cafe Awards is presented by the Bollywood film industry to honor and recognize the professional excellence of their peers. Matondkar has nomination for Best Actress.

Year	Category	Film	Result
2005	Best Actress	Ek Hasina Thi	Nominated

=== Apsara Film & Television Producers Guild Awards ===
The Apsara Film & Television Producers Guild Awards is presented by the Bollywood film industry to honor and recognize the professional excellence of their peers. Matondkar has won one award out of three nominations. All of the nominations were in the Best Actress in a Leading Role category.

Year	Category	Film	Result	Ref.
2004	Best Actress in a Leading Role	Bhoot	Won	
2004	Best Actress in a Leading Role	Pinjar	Nominated	
2006	Best Actress in a Leading Role	Maine Gandhi Ko Nahin Mara	Nominated	

=== Bollywood Movie Awards ===
The Bollywood Movie Awards were an annual film award ceremony held in Long Island, New York, United States between 1999 and 2007 celebrating films and actors from the Bollywood film industry. Matondkar was nominated three times and won each time. She has won the Most Sensational Actress award once and the Best Actress award twice.

Year	Category	Film	Result	Ref.
2001	Pyaar Tune Kya Kiya	Most Sensational Actress	Won	
2004	Bhoot	Best Actress	Won	
2006	Maine Gandhi Ko Nahin Mara	Best Actress	Won	

=== Filmfare Awards ===
The Filmfare Awards are presented annually by The Times Group to honor both artistic and technical excellence of professionals in the Hindi language film industry of India. Matondkar has won one award in the Best Actress (Critics) category and received six nominations, four in the Best Actress category, one in the Best Supporting Actress and one in the Best Villain category. She became the second actress to be nominated for the Best Villain category.

Year	Category	Film	Result	Ref.
1996	Best Actress	Rangeela	Nominated	
1998	Best Supporting Actress	Judaai	Nominated	
1999	Best Actress	Satya	Nominated	
2002	Best Villain	Pyaar Tune Kya Kiya	Nominated	
2004	Best Actress (Critics)	Bhoot	Won	
2004	Best Actress	Bhoot	Nominated	
2005	Best Actress	Ek Hasina Thi	Nominated	

=== International Indian Film Academy Awards ===
The International Indian Film Academy Awards are presented annually by the International Indian Film Academy to honour both artistic and technical excellence of professionals in Bollywood, the Hindi language film industry. Matondkar has been nominated twice for the Best Actress Award.

Year	Category	Film	Result
2004	Best Actress	Bhoot	Nominated
2005	Best Actress	Ek Hasina Thi	Nominated
2009	Best Villain	Karzzzz	Nominated

=== Asian Network Film Awards ===
Year	Film	Category	Result	Ref.
2004	Pinjar	Best Actress	Nominated	

=== Stardust Awards ===
The Stardust Awards is an award ceremony for Hindi movies, which is sponsored by Stardust magazine. Matondkar has received one nomination.

Year	Category	Film	Result
2009	Best Actor / Actress In Negative Role	Karzzzz	Nominated

=== Star Screen Awards ===
The Star Screen Awards is the only award ceremony in India to be involved with the Executive Director and the Governor of the Academy of Motion Picture Arts and Sciences. They are presented annually to honor professional excellence in the Hindi language film industry of India. Matondkar has received three nominations in the Best Actress category, winning the award one time.

Year	Category	Film	Result
2002	Best Actress	Pyaar Tune Kya Kiya	Nominated
2004	Best Actress	Bhoot	Won
2005	Best Actress	Ek Hasina Thi	Nominated

=== Zee Cine Awards ===
The Zee Cine Awards is an award ceremony for the Hindi film industry, now held abroad each year. Matondkar has received one award out of four nominations. She has been nominated for the Best Actor - Female category three times, winning it once.

Year	Category	Film	Result
1998	Best Actor in a Supporting Role - Female	Judaai	Nominated
2004	Best Actor - Female	Bhoot	Won
2005	Best Actor - Female	Ek Hasina Thi	Nominated
2006	Best Actor - Female	Maine Gandhi Ko Nahin Mara	Nominated

=== Nandi Awards ===
Year	Category	Film	Result	Ref.
1993	Best Supporting Actress	Gaayam	Won	

== Honours and recognitions ==
- In 2004, Matondkar received the Smita Patil Memorial Award for Best Actress.
- Matondkar has received a special Achievement in Bollywood award at the Rajiv Gandhi Memorial Awards.
