= Deepak Bhatt =

Deepak Bhatt Hindi: दीपक भट्ट
- Also known as: Deepak Bhatt
- Born: Deepak Bhatt; 11 June 1988 (age 38)
- Origin: Uttarakhand, Uttarkashi, India
- Occupation: Vlogging Musician
- Years active: 2010–present

Deepak Bhatt (Hindi: दीपक भट्ट, born 5 December 1988) is an Indian dhol player, musical producer, and composer. He has been in the Indian music industry for over a decade, having started at a very young age. Deepak, in his professional career, played with various national as well as international artists, and his talent and dedication towards his instrument has brought him a place amongst the Masters of percussion.

== Early life and education ==
Deepak Bhatt was born in Antop Hill, Mumbai to Jagdish Bhatt (father,) and Benarasi Bhatt (mother). His father and brothers would play dhol during festivals and at marriages. He showed talent in the field at an early age, accompanying his father and brother. They played on the local trains of Mumbai. Deepak studied until standard 8th in a government school before he began to pursue music as his career. He received formal training to play the dhol, an Indian two-sided percussion instrument, under his guru, Taufiq Qureshi in 2003.

== Career ==
Bhatt gravitated towards the dhol at a very early stage in his life and ever since, his dedication towards his instrument has brought him a place amongst the Masters of percussion.

The notable highlights of Deepak's career are: His participation in The Grammy Award winning World Music Album 2009 Global Drum Project by Giovanni Hidalgo, Mickey Hart, Sikiru Adepoju, and Zakir Hussain.

Intercontinental Masters of Percussion tour (USA, UK, India), where Bhatt shared the stage with Zakir Hussain and the other Masters of Percussion

Part of the 2009 Indian Circus A R Rahman band in Germany for Primetime Entertainment.

The three continent Masters of Percussion US, UK and India Tour in 2014 has been the highlight of his career sharing the stage with Ustad Zakir Hussain, Steve Smith, Niladri Kumar, Selva Ganesh, Dilshad Khan, Vijay Chavan, Rakesh Chaurasia, Sabir Khan, Abbos Kosimov.

== Films and television series ==
Apart from stage shows and tours, Deepak Bhatt has also played for music scores in the Indian Film and Indian Television Industry.

- Dhoom 2
- Bhool Bhulaiya
- Welcome
- Jab We Met
- Chandni Chowk to China
- Kites (film)
- Life in a Metro
- Sawariya
- London Dreams
- Partner
- Chillar Party
- 2 States: The Story of My Marriage
- Sa Re Ga Ma Pa
- Idea Jalsa
- Waar Parriwar
- Junoon (TV series)
