= Pyaar Tune Kya Kiya =

Pyaar Tune Kya Kiya (lit. 'Oh Love What Have You Done') may refer to:

- Pyaar Tune Kya Kiya (film), a 2001 Indian Hindi-language romantic thriller
- Pyaar Tune Kya Kiya (TV series), an Indian drama series 2013–present
