= Urmila Matondkar =

Indian actress (born 1974)

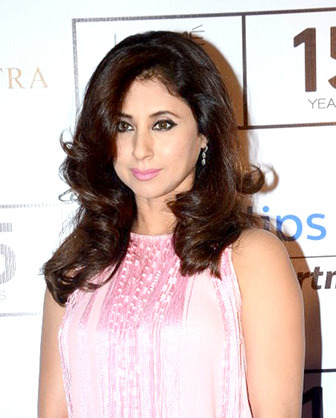
- Matondkar in 2015
- Born: 4 February 1974 (age 52); Bombay, Maharashtra, India
- Occupations: Actress; politician
- Years active: 1977–present
- Works: Full list
- Political party: Shiv Sena (since 2020)
- Other political affiliations: Indian National Congress (March 2019 – September 2019)
- Spouse: Mohsin Akhtar Mir (m. 2016; div. 2024)
- Awards: Full list

Urmila Matondkar (born 4 February 1974) is an Indian actress who later became a politician. Known for her work primarily in Hindi films, in addition to Telugu, Malayalam, Marathi and Tamil films, she has received numerous accolades, including a Filmfare Award and a Nandi Award. Having established a distinctive on-screen persona, she is known for her acting skills, style statements and dancing skills.

After making her debut as a child actor in the 1977 film Karm, Matondkar gained recognition with Masoom (1983) and later worked as a teenage actress, appearing in supporting roles in some films and television shows during the late 1980s. Her first lead role came with the Malayalam film Chanakyan (1989), and her subsequent lead role in Indian cinema with Narsimha (1991), both of which were commercial successes. After a brief setback, Matondkar emerged as a star with Ram Gopal Verma's romantic drama Rangeela (1995). She had further success in the drama Judaai (1997), the crime film Satya (1998), the love triangle Dillagi (1999), the romantic comedy Khoobsurat (1999), and the thriller Jungle (2000). She also played the leading lady in Malayalam, Telugu and Tamil films such as Antham (1992), Gaayam (1993), Thacholi Varghese Chekavar (1995), Indian (1996) and Anaganaga Oka Roju (1997).

Matondkar subsequently garnered critical recognition for portraying a range of intense characters in several psychological thrillers and horror films, including a paranoid young woman in Kaun? (1999), an obsessive lover in Pyaar Tune Kya Kiya (2001), a possessed woman in Bhoot (2003) and a violent avenger Ek Hasina Thi (2004). During these years, she also collaborated with independent filmmakers in art-house cinema, including the dramas Tehzeeb (2003), Pinjar (2003), Maine Gandhi Ko Nahin Mara (2005) and Bas Ek Pal (2006). She has since worked intermittently in films and television, including voice-over for the animated comedy Delhi Safari (2012), acting in the Marathi film Ajoba (2014) and serving as a talent judge on dance reality shows such as Jhalak Dikhhla Jaa (2007), Dance Maharashtra Dance (2012–2013) and DID Super Moms (2022).

Off-screen, Matondkar has participated in various concert tours and stage shows, and has walked the ramp on numerous occasions, most frequently for fashion designer Manish Malhotra. In 2019, Matondkar entered active politics, joining the Indian National Congress and contesting the Lok Sabha election that year, before later joining the Shiv Sena in 2020. Throughout her career, she has maintained a strong media presence and has been involved with several humanitarian causes. As a politician, she has spoken about the gender bias and challenges faced by women in Indian politics.

== Early life and child artist ==
Matondkar was born on 4 February 1974 in Bombay (present-day Mumbai) in a middle-class Hindu Maharashtrian family. Her father, Shrikant Matondkar is a retired officer of the erstwhile Grindlays Bank, while her mother Sunita Matondkar, is a retired state government employee. Matondkar has three siblings: an elder sister, Mamta, who is a former actress-turned-lawyer, another sister, Pooja, and a brother, Kedar, who served in the Indian Air Force.

Matondkar has consistently expressed pride in her Marathi roots, describing herself as a proud "Marathi mulgi". She has stated that being a Maharashtrian means "dignity and a great sense of self-respect", adding, "I take immense pride in my roots, culture, Marathi literature and language." She completed her schooling at King George High School (now renamed as Raja Shivaji Vidyalaya). Years later, she recalled spending her summer vacations at her grandparents' home in the Konkan region, describing the experience as "absolutely scenic, serene and a divine experience" with its temples, rivers and unspoilt beaches.

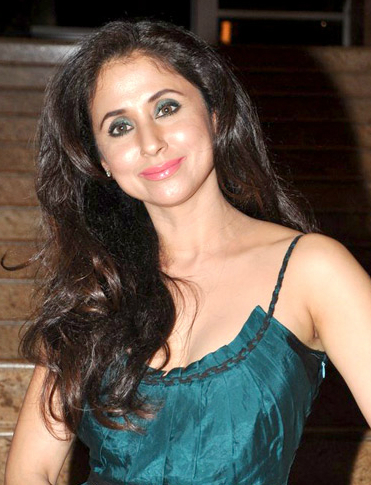
Matondkar at the launch of Jai Maharashtra channel in 2014.

As a child artist, she made her first screen appearance in B.R. Chopra's Karm (1977). Subsequently, she featured in Shreeram Lagoo's Marathi film Zaakol (1980), Shyam Benegal's crime Kalyug (1980), Shekhar Kapur's drama Masoom (1983), Praveen Bhatt's Bhavna (1984), K. Viswanath's Sur Sangam (1985). Her appearance in the song "Lakdi Ki Kathi" from Masoom became widely popular, and the song became a beloved children's classic. Reflecting on her early career, she later said that although she enjoyed acting, she had not consciously planned to become an actress during childhood.

Matondkar continued acting through her teenage years, appearing in small roles in films like Rahul Rawail's Dacait (1987) and Kalpataru's Bade Ghar Ki Beti (1989). During this period, she also did small roles in television serials, including Zindagi, Katha Sagar and Indradhanush. Her role in the serial Titliyan, initially intended to last only two episodes, was extended after the makers were impressed by her performance.

Matondkar simultaneously studied at DG Ruparel College, where she had intended to major in psychology. She she would likely have pursued a career in the field, had she not become an actres, she later recalled in an interview. She dropped out of college to begin her prominent acting career after landing her big-break in Bollywood.

== Main career ==
=== Debut and initial roles (1989–1994) ===
Matondkar made her formal debut as a grown-up in 1989, with T. K. Rajeev Kumar's Malayalam blockbuster Chanakyan, opposite Kamal Haasan. Her Bollywood debut came with N. Chandra's 1991 action drama film Narsimha, which starred Sunny Deol. Matondkar played Meenu Singh, the rebellious daughter of a crime boss (played by Om Puri) and love-interest of Ravi Behl's character. Upon release, the film emerged as a commercial success.

In 1992, Matondkar starred in Rajiv Mehra's ghost comedy Chamatkar, alongside Shah Rukh Khan and Naseeruddin Shah. In the same year, her first Telugu film came with the action-crime Antham, and its Hindi bilingual Drohi, opposite Nagarjuna. She played Bhavna, an ornithologist who is in love with Nagarjuna's character. Upon release, the film received positive reviews from critics. The film also marked first of Matondkar's many collaborations with director Ram Gopal Verma.

In 1993, Matondkar appeared in Shreemaan Aashique opposite Rishi Kapoor and Bedardi opposite Ajay Devgn— both these films failed critically and commercially. Varma's Telugu political thriller Gaayam (1993) was her next release. The film garnered positive reviews, with six state Nandi Awards, and emerged a Super Hit at the box office. Matondkar's performance earned her a Nandi Award for Best Supporting Actress. She gained wider public recognition with the 1994 hit romantic drama Aa Gale Lag Ja, starring alongside Jugal Hansraj.

=== Rangeela and rise to prominence (1995–1999) ===
In 1995, Matondkar established herself as a leading actress of contemporary Hindi cinema by featuring in Varma's musical romance Rangeela, one of the top-grossing productions of the year. Co-starring Aamir Khan and Jackie Shroff, the film emerged as a blockbuster with a gross of ₹334 million. Matondkar played Mili Joshi, an effervescent fun-loving friend of a street-toughened orphan, with ambitions of becoming an actress. At the 41st Filmfare Awards, Rangeela was nominated for 12 awards including a first Best Actress nomination for Matondkar. The film was screened at the International Film Festival of India.

"I was happy that the masses in the south had accepted me, but then I felt that the Hindi audiences also should... Rangeela was a very wonderful film, a great experience. The music by A R Rahman, the direction, coupled with the technical expertise of Ram Gopal Verma and the acting abilities of all the artists were all useful."

— Matondkar, talking about Rangeela, in an interview.

In the same year, she also starred alongside Mohanlal in the Malayalam action Thacholi Varghese Chekavar. She played Maya, the only witness in a homicide who is kept under house arrest by her parents. The next year, she played Sapna, the daughter of an RTO official in S. Shankar's Indian (1996), which marked her first Tamil film. It was also dubbed and released in Hindi under the title Hindustani. Featuring Kamal Haasan in dual roles alongside Matondkar and Manisha Koirala, it was the most expensive Indian film at that time, with a budget of ₹150 million. Nirupama Subramanian of India Today felt the film was a commercial potboiler and wrote, "Indian has dances, foot-tapping melodies by A. R. Rahman and two pretty women, Manisha Koirala and Urmila Matondkar". Both Indian and Hindustani were commercial successes. The film was India's official entry for the Best Foreign Language Film for the Academy Awards in 1996, but was not nominated.

Matondkar's first release of 1997 was Raj Kanwar's melodrama Judaai. A remake of the 1994 Telugu film Shubhalagnam, it tells the story of Kajal (played by Sridevi), lured by wealth who asks her husband, Raj (played by Anil Kapoor), an honest engineer, to marry Janhvi (played by Matondkar), the rich daughter of his boss. The Indian Express asserted that "it is Urmila Matondkar who comes out with flying colours". The film emerged as a commercial success and her performance fetched her a Filmfare Best Supporting Actress Award nomination.

A still from Daud (1997), featuring Matondkar (in the background) and Sanjay Dutt.

Her next releases were the crime comedy Daud alongside Sanjay Dutt, the romantic drama Mere Sapno Ki Rani alongside Sanjay Kapoor and the action romance Aflatoon alongside Akshay Kumar. All these films underperformed at the box-office. She next reunited with Varma for her third Telugu release, the road movie Anaganaga Oka Roju, starring alongside J. D. Chakravarthy. The film involves the comic travails of a couple eloping, on the run from their parents who get entangled as murder suspects of a politician, in a police and political mafia road hunt for an incriminating audio tape. The film received positive reviews and emerged as a box office hit.

Her next release was the crime thriller Satya (1998), for which she received another Filmfare Best Actress nomination. The film was received favourably by critics and was a huge hit at the box office, solidifying Matondkar's position as a leading lady of Bollywood. Satya was on CNN-IBN's 2013 list of the 100 greatest Indian films of all time, in the 100 Filmfare Days series and on the "70 iconic movies of independent India" list. It was mentioned in Rachel Dwyer's 100 Bollywood Films (where she called it a "masterpiece"), and in critic and author Shubhra Gupta's 50 Films That Changed Bollywood, 1995-2015.

In 1999, Matondkar had six film releases; three of them − Jaanam Samjha Karo, Hum Tum Pe Marte Hain and Mast − were commercial failures. However, Matondkar's performances were generally well received by critics, (nn a review for Jaanam Samjha Karo, Rediff stating, "Urmila is just about the only heroine who can give Karisma a run for her money when it comes to pelvic thrusts"). Later in 1999, she starred opposite Sunny Deol and Bobby Deol in the romantic film Dillagi. The film did an average business and her role was well appreciated. Her next movie that year was Varma's psychological horror thriller Kaun, opposite Manoj Bajpayee, where she played a nameless character. Khalid Mohamed of The Times of India (who would later cast her in Tehzeeb) wrote, "She rivets the viewer's interest, carrying off entire reels on her shoulders, through a gamut of quicksilver facial expressions. Vulnerable and baffled, she is utterly believable as the traumatised girl-next-door". Matondkar next played the love interest of Sanjay Dutt's character in the action comedy Khoobsurat. It emerged as a box-office average grosser.

=== Critical recognition (2000–2005) ===
During early to mid-2000s, Matondkar revealed strong, dramatic and psychological features in her roles, and delivered a number of critically acclaimed performances. In 2000, Matondkar re-united with Varma for the action Jungle, alongside Fardeen Khan and Sunil Shetty. She played Anu, who is hostaged by the chief of bandits, when he starts liking her. Taran Adarsh wrote, "Urmila is at ease in a role that gives her ample scope to showcase her talent. Her scenes with Durga can easily be singled out, for they have been shot with brilliance." The film was both critically and commercially successful. She next starred opposite Govinda in David Dhawan's romantic comedy Kunwara. The film underperformed at the box office, with a grossing of ₹182 million (US$1.9 million).

The next year, Matondkar portrayed Ria, an obsessed lover, in Rajat Mukherjee's romantic thriller Pyaar Tune Kya Kiya, a film which received critical acclaim. Her performance was highly acclaimed and several critics noted her for showing great emotional range and depth. Taran Adarsh opined, "the 'actual hero' of the film is definitely Urmila. Her career-best performance, she oozes intensity, love, hate, relentlessness and obsessive behaviour with perfection." A critic of Planet Bollywood described her as "the star of the show" and added, "Urmila is simply mind blowing in this film. If you hate everything else in the film, her performance will surely win you over! Her last two scenes in the film are simply breath taking." The film emerged successful at the box office with gross earnings of ₹281 million (US$2.9 million). Matondkar received various Best Villain nominations for her performance, including a Filmfare Award for Best Performance in a Negative Role nomination.

In 2002, Matondkar appeared alongside an ensemble cast (Waheeda Rehman, Anil Kapoor, Fardeen Khan, Mahima Chaudhary, Abhishek Bachchan and Tara Sharma), in the drama Om Jai Jagadish. She played the role of Neetu, the love interest of the protagonist (played by Fardeen Khan). The film failed commercially. Anees Bazmee's psychological thriller Deewangee was her next release. She played Sargam, a popular singer, who is the object of conflict between the protagonist and antagonist. Co-starring Ajay Devgan and Akshaye Khanna, the film was well received by critics and was moderately successful at the box office. Deepa Gumaste, writing for Rediff, praised the performances of the three leads and wrote: "As usual, the heroine has little to do apart from looking cute in the first half and scared in the second. It is another matter that she is supposed to be the object of the film's conflict. For what it is worth, Urmila Matondkar executes her part well".

Her first release of 2003 was the supernatural horror Bhoot. She played Swati, a ghost-possessed woman. Taran Adarsh wrote praised her performance and wrote: "...the film clearly belongs to Urmila Matondkar all the way. To state that she is excellent would be doing gross injustice to her work. Sequences when she is possessed are simply astounding. If this performance doesn't deserve an award, no other performance should. It beats all competition hollow". Khalid Mohamed wrote, "Matondkar is consistently excellent - controlled and persuasively vulnerable – as the beleaguered wife, evoking your concern and empathy. She's the major triumph of Bhoot actually". She received her first Filmfare Award under the Best Actress (Critics' Choice) as well as various Best Actress awards at different award ceremonies, including Star Screen Awards, Zee Cine Awards and Bollywood Movie Awards. She received another Filmfare Award for Best Actress nomination and also received the national honour Rajiv Gandhi Award for the work in the film, also recognising her achievements in Bollywood. The film became successful at the box office with gross earnings of ₹224 million (US$2.3 million).

She achieved further critical acclaim for her portrayal of the title role of a girl in a strained relationship with her mother, in Khalid Mohammed's crime drama Tehzeeb (2003). Rediff complimented her by stating, "Urmila as the emotionally scarred Tehzeeb, who is uncomfortable expressing her feelings even to her husband, has done a commendable job. The only person she expresses her love to is her mentally challenged sister." She next played the role of Puro, a North Indian girl who leads a happy life but her dreams of a happy future are shattered when, one evening, she is kidnapped by Bajpayee's character, in the background of the 1947 India partition in the critically acclaimed Pinjar (2003). Derek Elley of Variety reviewed the film commenting, "A handsomely shot drama centered on a Hindu woman's travails during the 1947 Partition, "Pinjar" ranks as one of the better Bollywood treatments of this still hot-button issue. Good performances, especially by lead actress Urmila Matondkar and by Manoj Bajpai as her Muslim partner, compensate for a slightly wobbly structure".

In 2004, Matondkar starred in the thriller Ek Hasina Thi. The film (which marked the debut of Sriram Raghavan) tells the story of a Sarika Vartak, a deceived woman, played by Matondkar, who is jailed and arrested for having links with the underworld, because of her lover, played by Khan, and later flees from prison to seek revenge on him. Upon release, the film was positively received by critics, with Matondkar's performance earning praise. The Deccan Herald commented: "An author-backed role ensures that Urmila gets to do everything just right. Whether it's kicking a bully into shape in the dreary prison of which she's an inmate or whether it's making nice with Karan while plotting his ruin, she's a total treat. She carries off the transition from naive to knowing effortlessly. Seductive and steely, she's quite explosive." The film was a box office success. For her performance, Matondkar received nominations at the Filmfare, Screen, Zee Cine and IIFA ceremonies. The film was premiered at the New York Asian Film Festival.

In 2005, she played the title role in the horror Naina. The film tells the story of Matondkar's character who after receiving an eye transplant, realises that she can see into the supernatural world. The film was premiered in the Marché du Film section at the 2005 Cannes Film Festival. She next starred as Trisha Chaudhary, a caring daughter of Professor Uttam Chaudhary, played by Anupam Kher, in Jahnu Barua's art drama Maine Gandhi Ko Nahin Mara. The film was well received by critics, with Rediff stating, "Her credibility as a versatile actress is further established in her reserved albeit realistic delivery of emotions." Matondkar won her second Bollywood Movie Award for Best Actress for her role.

=== Career slowdown (2006–2008) ===
From 2006 onward, Matondkar's film appearances became increasingly sporadic, and she began to maintain a relatively low profile. She first appeared in Pankaj Parashar's romance Banaras: A Mystic Love Story (2006) with Ashmit Patel and Dimple Kapadia. The film was not well received by critics, with Raja Sen commenting: "And then there's Urmila. Let's start with the good. She looks great, refreshingly beautiful and striking. That's about it. This is an actress who has worked hard to earn respectability, but this role, like the film itself, suffers from inconsistency".

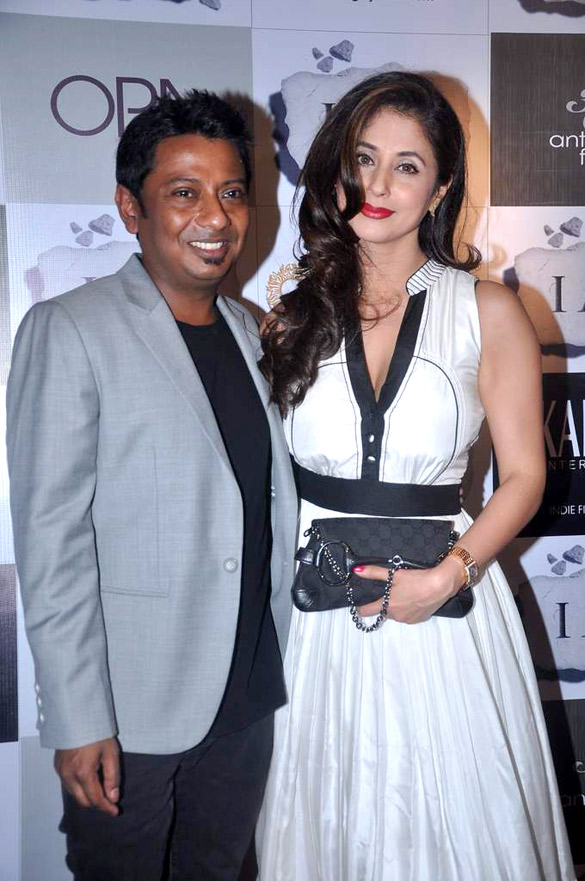
Matondkar with her Bas Ek Pal director Onir, in 2011.

Her next release was Onir's Bas Ek Pal (2006). Matondkar said she accepted the role because she found the film's screenplay contemporary and sensitive and was impressed by Onir's previous film, My Brother... Nikhil (2005). Although Bas Ek Pal received mixed reviews from critics, Matondkar's performance was praised, with Taran Adarsh describing her as "perfect" in the role and the film's soundtrack also became very popular that year, particularly Atif Aslam's song "Tere Bin", which also featured Matondkar.

In 2007, Matondkar appeared in an item song in Ram Gopal Varma's Aag and was later seen in a cameo in the ensemble song "Deewangi Deewangi", in Farah Khan's Om Shanti Om. In the same year, she was seen in the action-thriller Speed as part of an ensemble cast. Noting her reduced acting appearances during this phase, Taran Adarsh wrote in his review, "Urmila handles her part with dexterity and adds freshness to the goings-on since she has cut down on her acting assignments".

The next year, Matondkar appeared alongside Himesh Reshammiya in the thriller Karzzzz (2008), a remake of the 1980 film Karz. Her performance as Kamini (originally played by Simi Garewal) received praise, although the film was a critical and commercial failure. She also re-united with Sanjay Dutt for the social-comedy EMI - Liya Hai Toh Chukana Padega! in the same year. EMI remains Matondkar's last leading role in Bollywood to date, although she continued to appear occasionally in films and television in the following years.

=== Sporadic work (2012–present) ===
After a four-year absence from major film roles, Matondkar returned to films by voicing the character of Begum in the Hindi version of the animated musical comedy Delhi Safari, released in 2012. The same year, she made a special appearance in an item song in the Marathi film Hridayanath, starring Jackie Shroff. In 2013, she was seen in a cameo role in the adventure-comedy Life Mein Hungama Hai, which released after a delay of several years and went unnoticed.

In 2014, Matondkar appeared in her first full-fledged role in Marathi cinema in the adventure-drama Ajoba. In the film, she portrayed Purva Rao, a wildlife activist in search of leopards. Praising her performance, Daily News and Analysis wrote, "..this one's another jewel in her crown. She portrays Purva with a mild aggressive and rebellious streak. But all of these are an undercurrent to Purva's actions."

Matondkar at a film screening in 2025.

In 2018, Matondkar ventured into film-production with the Marathi film Madhuri, as a co-producer along with her husband Mohsin Akhtar, under the banner Mumbapuri Productions. In the same year, she made a very brief return to Bollywood with a special appearance in the dark comedy Blackmail, in the song "Bewafa Beauty".

In 2022, Matondkar was announced to star with Shreyas Talpade in a Marathi film titled Tee Mee Navhech. However, no significant updates on the project have been announced since. Later that year, she was announced to make her OTT debut with the action-thriller web series Tiwari, in which she plays the title role in a story centred on a mother and daughter. The series has subsequently faced post-production delays, and is unreleased as of 2026.

Matondkar has also been roped in for another upcoming IIT-based series produced by TVF, slated for release in mid-2027.

== Other work ==
=== Reality television ===
Alongside her film career, Matondkar has appeared as a celebrity guest on several reality television programmes, like Movers & Shakers, Boogie Woogie and The Manish Malhotra Show. She also presented an episode of Sahara TV's Dil Ki Baatein series in 2003, which featured Bollywood celebrities presenting vignettes from their personal lives..

In 2006, Matondkar was announced as a judge on Sahara One's reality show Superstars alongside choreographer Shiamak Davar, although the show was apparently shelved. However, a year later, she and Davar joined veteran actor Jeetendra as judges for the second season of Sony's dance reality show Jhalak Dikhhla Jaa. Describing her experience of judging the show, Matondkar said, "I'm ecstatic about being able to be part of this show. I was facing the participants and audience for the first time. There were no written lines, no cues, no second chances. Either it worked or it didn't work for you. It was a concept that I liked." The next year, she hosted the singing reality show Waar Parriwar on the same channel. She mentioned in an interview that she agreed to host the show because she felt comfortable with its family-oriented format, and also emphasized her preference for authenticity over scripted drama in reality TV.

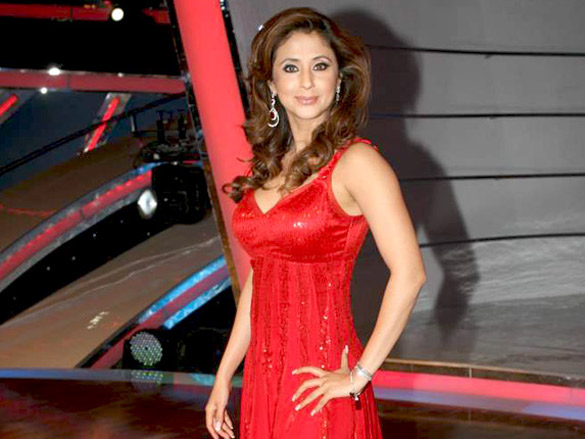
Matondkar on the sets of Chak Dhoom Dhoom season 2 in 2011.

In 2011, she was roped in for the second season of Colors' dance reality show Chak Dhoom Dhoom. She replaced Mallika Sherawat, and joined Javed Jaffrey and Terence Lewis in the judging panel. Matondkar subsequently ventured into Marathi television, with Zee Marathi's dance reality show Marathi Paaul Padte Pudhe (2011–2012), where she served as a judge in its second season. She then featured as the 'Grand Master' judge in Dance Maharashtra Dance (2012–2013), on the same channel.

After ten years, Matondkar returned to Hindi television with the third season of DID Super Moms (2022), on Zee TV. She featured as a co-judge alongside Remo D'Souza and Bhagyashree. In an interview for the show, she supported the inclusion of personal backstories of the contestants on reality television, stating that it was important for audiences to understand their journeys and struggles. Matondkar continues to make occasional appearances as a guest in shows like Indian Idol, Sa Re Ga Ma Pa, Dance Deewane, Zee Comedy Show, Khupte Tithe Gupte and India's Best Dancer.

=== Stage and fashion appearances ===
Matondkar has been a frequent performer at various Indian film award ceremonies and events, such as Filmfare Awards, Filmfare Awards South, IIFA Awards, Stardust Awards,Bollywood Movie Awards, International Film Festival of India among others. She has also performed at several non-film events, including the inaugural ceremonies of Pravasi Bharatiya Divas and Afro-Asian Games in 2003, as well as award ceremonies organised by CEAT Cricket Ratings, in 2003 and 2007. She co-hosted the 9th IIFA Awards in 2008, alongside Boman Irani and Riteish Deshmukh.

Matondkar at India Bridal Week in 2010.

In April 2010, Matondkar, alongside Mahesh Manjrekar, co-hosted the launch event of the IPL team Sahara Pune Warriors (later renamed as Pune Warriors India) in Pune. In 2013, she performed at the GR8! Women Awards in Dubai, where she paid tribute to 100 years of Hindi Cinema through a medley of Bollywood hits. In 2018, she appeared in Star Plus's religious special program called Adbhut Ganesh Utsav, and performed as part of a huge celebrity line-up celebrating the Ganesh Chaturthi festival.

Matondkar has also walked the runway on numerous occasions for fashion designers such as Manish Malhotra, Rohit Verma, Krishna Mehta and Jaya Rathore. Particularly for Malhotra, she has walked the ramp on multiple occasions, including fashion events like the Lakme Fashion Week. Matondkar has stated that she enjoys walking the ramp because it involves "style and glamour". In February 2013, she walked for Malhotra in London to support the Angeli Foundation, that works to empower the Girl Child in India.

=== Other media appearances ===
As a celebrity, Matondkar has appeared in advertisements and endorsed several brands throughout her career, including Lux and Snickers. In 2003, Matondkar was among several Bollywood celebrities, including Vivek Oberoi, who appeared in a WHO–backed anti-tobacco public service advertising campaign warning against the glamorisation of smoking in Bollywood and public culture.

In 2004, Matondkar featured in the music video of the song "Deewanay", by the Pakistani pop-rock band Fuzön, directed by Prahlad Kakkar and Saqib Malik. The collaboration aimed at promoting India–Pakistan peace and cultural exchange, drawing major media attention when she visited Lahore to shoot the video. In 2007, Matondkar marked a rare venture into singing by lending her vocals to the song "Mehbooba Dilruba", for Asha Bhonsle's music album Asha & Friends Vol. 1, and also appeared in the accompanying video of the song with Bhonsle.

== Political career ==
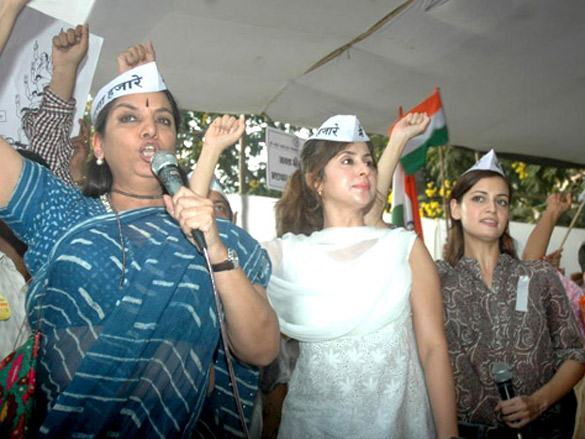
Matondkar in a rally for Anna Hazare's movement, alongside Shabana Azmi and Dia Mirza, in 2011.

Prior to entering active politics, Matondkar was associated with various charitable initiatives and has particularly supported causes related to the empowerment of women in India. She was among several film personalities who rallied in support of Anna Hazare's anti-corruption movement in 2011 in Mumbai.

Matondkar officially joined the Indian National Congress on 27 March 2019. She stated in an interview that she had been approached for political roles earlier in her career too, but had chosen to decline them before eventually entering politics due to socio-political concerns. She contested from Mumbai North constituency in the 2019 Lok Sabha Election. She lost out to Gopal Shetty of the Bhartiya Janta Party, who retained the seat by a massive margin of over 4 lakhs votes. She resigned from the party on 10 September 2019 by submitting her writing to Sonia Gandhi (then interim chief of the Congress), and cited "petty in-house politics" as a reason behind her resignation.

On 1 December 2020, Matondkar joined the Shiv Sena in presence of party president Uddhav Thackeray. Shiv Sena hoped to add a nationally recognised face and voice, well conversant in Marathi, Hindi as well as English, to represent the party. In 2022, she participated in Bharat Jodo Yatra, joining Rahul Gandhi during the march, despite having earlier left the Congress.

== Reception and impact ==
=== Artistry ===
Matondkar has been described by critics as one of the most talented actresses of Indian cinema and has also been praised for her dancing skills. The Tribune described her as a versatile actress and a "glam doll" who successfully transitioned from child artist roles to a leading performer. Following the success of Rangeela (1995), media coverage frequently described Matondkar as a "sex symbol" of contemporary Hindi cinema, a label that she acknowledged as being shaped largely by publicity and promotional framing, which contributed to her being typecast. She was included in The Tribune's list of Bollywood's top five actresses of 1998.

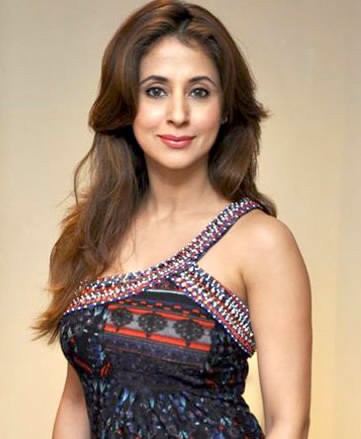
Matondkar in 2010

By the early 2000s, publications such as Rediff noted that she had moved beyond the early "glamour" label, establishing herself through varied and often unconventional roles in films such as Kaun?, Bhoot, and Pinjar. Because she could go from being the ultimate glamour girl to being completely de-glammed and terrified in a dark apartment, the film press in that era often described her as "The Goddess" — someone who could hold audience with just her eyes, whether she was dancing or in complete silence. In a 2003 feature interview in The Tribune, Matondkar was described as an established actress whose career included both commercial films and roles across varied genres. She featured in Rediff's "Top Bollywood Actresses" listing in the same year.

"I have always tried to make life interesting for myself by doing different roles that connect mainstream cinema with its offbeat counterpart. I guess I have been daring and lucky with my roles. I want to do every kind of role with a reasonable amount of panache. I want to be a fair combination of style and substance"

— Matondkar on her approach to acting, during an interview in 2002.

Film critic Sukanya Verma described Matondkar as "a thinking actress who performs spontaneously," adding that "it is her charismatic image that stays with the audience. She is an actress with a lot of style and a fair amount of substance." Planet Bollywood described Matondkar as "a force to reckon with in the industry" in its review of Ek Hasina Thi (2004). Praising her dancing skills, choreographer Saroj Khan said of Matondkar, "You only have to show her the step once. Urmila is that quick ... Rhythm is in her blood." Music composer Anu Malik described Matondkar as "a person with soul" and said that her "sensuous looks" suited rhythm and blues music. Actor Fardeen Khan, Matondkar's co-star in Pyaar Tune Kya Kiya (2001), described her as "a director's actor" who "completely surrenders herself to the character." Director Khalid Mohamed stated that Matondkar had originally been considered for the title role in Fiza (2001) and he later rewrote portions of Tehzeeb (2003) to suit her character, noting that, "Urmila surprised me with her performance. She was all there! I had misjudged her." Director Onir said he cast Matondkar for Bas Ek Pal (2006) because he wanted an actor who was "glamorous, independent and a good performer", believing she was well suited to the character's evolution over the course of the film.

Retrospective media commentary has also noted how Matondkar's image in films evolved over time. Saurav Bhanot of ScoopWhoop wrote, "Breaking Bollywood stereotypes of how heroines should be on-screen, Urmila was always ahead of her times. With Rangeela, Urmila single-handedly redefined the 90s Bollywood heroine." Film critic Subhash K. Jha of Bollywood Hungama has also praised her work. In a 2025 interview with The Times of India, Matondkar reflected on the challenges of sustaining a career in a constantly evolving entertainment industry, discussing the need for adaptability in maintaining relevance over time.

=== Media image and influence ===
Matondkar has been cited by media as a fashion and cultural style icon in Hindi cinema, and her image has been referenced in Indian popular culture. In 1999, The Times of India reported that American men's magazine Maxim had listed Matondkar among the "sexiest women in the world", which was later reiterated in other media reports. She was reported to be among the highest tax-paying Bollywood actors in India in 2003.

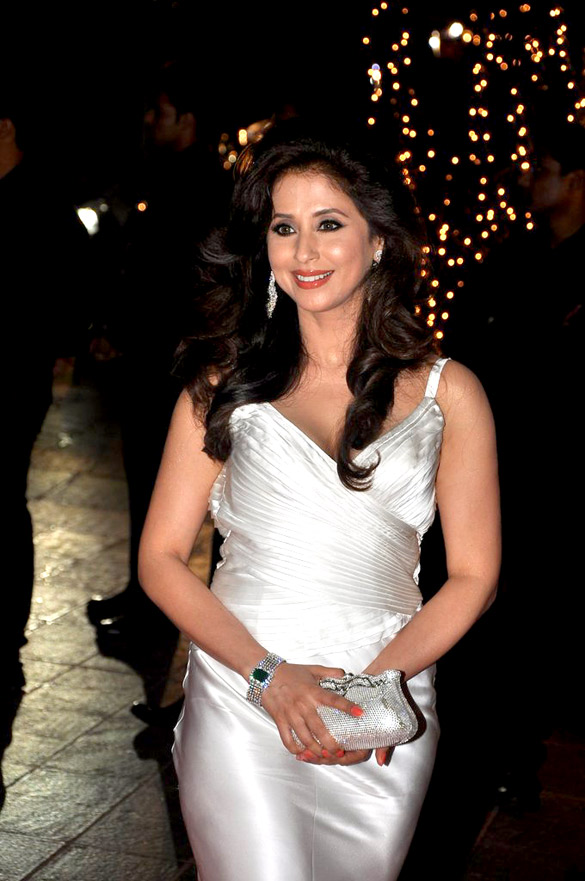
Matondkar at Karan Johar's birthday party in 2012.

Fashion designer Manish Malhotra credited Matondkar as the first actor to walk as his showstopper, stating that her appearance on the ramp "started the trend of showstoppers" in Bollywood fashion presentations. Their collaboration in Rangeela also led to the introduction of the Filmfare Award for Best Costume Design, which Malhotra won. He credited Matondkar's contribution to the film's styling, noting that "a lot of credit goes to Urmila". Ram Gopal Varma said he was "mesmerised" by Matondkar's screen presence, stating that one of his primary motivations for making Rangeela was to capture her on film and establish her as a benchmark for screen glamour. Actress Antara Mali's styling in Varma's later works, such as Road and Naach, drew comparisons with Matondkar's screen image and fashion persona. In 2020, actress Kiara Advani paid tribute to Matondkar’s iconic "Rangeela look" for a song in her film Indoo Ki Jawani, which Matondkar later appreciated on social media.

Beyond films, television, and fashion, Matondkar has maintained a media presence through public appearances and lifestyle advocacy. She condemned the misuse of mobile technology, amid controversies surrounding fake and morphed MMS clips targeting actresses in the early 2000s, calling it "terrorism of technology." She has consistently advocated healthy living and mental well-being, particularly among young women, cautioning against eating disorders, unrealistic beauty standards like the "Size zero", and societal expectations surrounding marriage and "settling down." In 2020, she publicly defended Bollywood amid widespread criticism and boycott calls against the industry. During this period, an old Amul butter advertisement inspired by her appearance in Rangeela resurfaced online, sparking debates around online trolling and cancel culture. Several members of the industry supported Matondkar following the remarks made against her. In 2026, she attended Mumbai RTO's Fun Run – Walk for Safety event, where she advocated stricter adherence to road safety rules.

== Personal life ==
Matondkar met Kashmir-based businessman and model Mohsin Akhtar Mir at a wedding in 2014. The couple married on 3 March 2016, in a private ceremony attended by close family members and friends.

After eight years of marriage, Matondkar filed for divorce from Mir in 2024.

== See also ==
- List of Indian film actresses
- List of Hindi film actresses
