= Bollywood Movie Awards =

Former annual Indian film award ceremony

The Bollywood Movie Awards was an annual film award ceremony held between 1999 and 2007 in Long Island, New York, United States, celebrating films and actors from the Bollywood film industry based in Mumbai, India.

== History ==
The predecessor to the award ceremony was introduced in 1992 by Kamal Dandona, the head of The Bollywood Group and was originally titled, "Nataraj Awards". It was renamed and relaunched as Bollywood Movie Awards in 1999. Michael Jackson won a Humanitarian Award in 1999, Richard Gere a Man of Conscience award, and Sharon Stone an award connected to her work with AIDS. During the 2007 ceremonies, Danny Glover received an award for Outstanding Contribution to Global Entertainment and Mira Nair for Pride of India Award. Phylicia Rashad and Donald Trump also made appearances. These awards are given to those well deserving due to their excellent skills in acting and those who know the craft. They are applauded on several occasions including those of IIFA and Filmfare awards.

== Fans ==
Fans of Bollywood films nominated their favourite stars for each respective award category on the Bollywood Group's official website. They appreciate the work of Indian film stars and on annual polls for awards, they vote for their favourite candidates. The chosen candidate then picks up the award at the ceremony.

== Awards ==
=== Best Film ===
Year	Film	Producer
1999	Kuch Kuch Hota Hai	Yash Johar
2000	Taal	Subhash Ghai
2001	Kaho Naa... Pyaar Hai	Rakesh Roshan
2002	Kabhi Khushi Kabhie Gham	Karan Johar
2003	Devdas	Bharat Shah
2004	Kal Ho Naa Ho	Yash Johar
2005	Veer-Zaara	Yash Chopra
2006	Black	Sanjay Leela Bhansali
2007	Lage Raho Munna Bhai	Vidhu Vinod Chopra

=== Best Director ===
Year	Director	Film
1998	Ram Gopal Varma	Satya
1999	Karan Johar	Kuch Kuch Hota Hai
2001	Rakesh Roshan	Kaho Naa... Pyaar Hai
2002	Ram Gopal Varma	Company
2003	Ram Gopal Varma	Bhoot
2004	Rajkumar Hirani	Munna Bhai MBBS
2005	Yash Chopra	Veer-Zaara
2006	Sanjay Leela Bhansali	Black
2007	Rajkumar Hirani	Lage Raho Munnabhai

=== Best Actor ===
Year	Actor	Film
1999	Shahrukh Khan	Kuch Kuch Hota Hai
2000
2001	Hrithik Roshan	Kaho Naa... Pyaar Hai
2002	Aamir Khan	Lagaan
2003	Shahrukh Khan	Devdas
2004	Hrithik Roshan	Koi... Mil Gaya
2005	Shahrukh Khan	Swades
2006	Amitabh Bachchan	Black
2007	Hrithik Roshan	Dhoom 2

=== Best Actress ===
Year	Actress	Film
2007	Bipasha Basu	Corporate
2006	Urmila Matondkar	Maine Gandhi Ko Nahin Mara
2005	Rani Mukerji	Hum Tum
2004	Urmila Matondkar	Bhoot
2003	Aishwarya Rai	Devdas
2002	Kajol	Kabhi Khushi Kabhie Gham
2001	Karisma Kapoor	Fiza
2000	Aishwarya Rai	Taal
1999	Kajol	Kuch Kuch Hota Hai

=== Best Supporting Actor ===
Year	Actor	Film
2007	Vivek Oberoi	Omkara
2006	Akshay Kumar	Phir Hera Pheri
2005	Abhishek Bachchan	Yuva
2004	Arshad Warsi	Munna Bhai M.B.B.S.
2003	Akshay Kumar	Awara Paagal Deewana
2002	Hrithik Roshan	Kabhi Khushi Kabhie Gham
2001	Akshay Kumar	Hera Pheri
2000
1999	Anupam Kher	Salaakhen

=== Best Supporting Actress ===
Year	Actor	Film
2007	Kirron Kher	Rang De Basanti
2006	Ayesha Kapur	Black
2005	Rani Mukerji	Yuva
2004	Rekha	Koi Mil Gaya
2003	Kirron Kher	Devdas
2002	Raveena Tandon	Aks
2001	Mahima Chaudhary	Dhadkan
1999	Shilpa Shetty	Pardesi Babu

=== Best Villain ===
Year	Actor	Film
2007	Saif Ali Khan	Omkara
2006	Gulshan Grover	Dus
2005	Abhishek Bachchan	Yuva
2004	Bipasha Basu	Jism
2003	Ajay Devgan	Deewangee
2002	Amrish Puri	Gadar Ek Prem Katha
2001	Gulshan Grover	Aaghaaz
2000	Sayaji Shinde	Shool
1999	Amrish Puri	Salaakhen

=== Best Comedian ===
Year	Actor	Film
2007	Anupam Kher	Khosla Ka Ghosla
2006	Abhishek Bachchan	Bunty Aur Babli
2005	Aftab Shivdasani	Masti
2004	Paresh Rawal	Hungama
2003	Shekhar Suman	Chor Machaaye Shor
2002	Saif Ali Khan	Dil Chahta Hai
2001	Paresh Rawal	Hera Pheri
2000
1999	Satish Kaushik	Pardesi Babu

=== Best Male Debut ===
Year	Actor	Film
2007	Upen Patel	36 China Town
2004	John Abraham	Jism
2003	Vivek Oberoi	Company
2002	Tusshar Kapoor	Mujhe Kuch Kehna Hai
2001	Hrithik Roshan	Kaho Na Pyar Hai
2000
1999	Fardeen Khan	Prem Aggan

=== Best Female Debut ===
Year	Actor	Film
2007	Kangana Ranaut	Gangster
2006	Chitrangada Singh	Hazaaron Khwaishein Aisi
2005	Gayatri Joshi	Swades
2004	Perizaad Zorabian	Jogger's Park
2003	Esha Deol	Koi Mere Dil Se Poochhe
2002	Dia Mirza	Rehnaa Hai Terre Dil Mein
2001	Kareena Kapoor	Refugee
2000
1999	Preity Zinta	Soldier

=== Critics Award Male ===
Year	Actor	Film
2006
2005
2004	Hrithik Roshan	Koi Mil Gaya
2003	Sanjay Dutt	Kaante
2002	Aamir Khan	Dil Chahta Hai
2001	Amitabh Bachchan	Mohabbatein
2000	Anil Kapoor	Taal
1999	Ajay Devgan	Zakhm

=== Critics Award Female ===
Year	Actor	Film
2006
2005	Kirron Kher	Khamosh Pani
2004	Kareena Kapoor	Chameli
2003	Rani Mukerji	Saathiya
2002	Raveena Tandon	Aks
2001	Tabu	Astitva
2000
1999	Pooja Bhatt	Zakhm

=== Most Sensational Actor ===
Year	Actor	Film
2006
2005
2004	Sanjay Dutt	Munnabhai MBBS
2003	Amitabh Bachchan	Kaante
2002	Salman Khan	Chori Chori Chupke Chupke
2001	Anil Kapoor	Pukar
2000
1999	Shahrukh Khan	Dil Se..

=== Most Sensational Actress ===
Year	Actor	Film
2006
2005
2004	Hema Malini	Baghban
2003	Karisma Kapoor	Shakti: The Power
2002	Urmila Matondkar	Pyaar Tune Kya Kiya
2001
2000	Aishwarya Rai	Taal
1999	Juhi Chawla	Duplicate

=== Best Lyricist ===
Year	Writer	Film
2007	Prasoon Joshi	Fanaa
2006	Gulzar	Paheli
2005	Javed Akhtar	Veer Zaara
2004	Javed Akhtar	Chalte Chalte
2003	Nida Fazli	Sur
2002
2001
2000	Javed Akhtar	Refugee
1999

=== Best Music ===
Year	Music Director	Film
2007	Shankar–Ehsaan–Loy	Kabhi Alvida Naa Kehna
2006	A. R. Rahman	Rang De Basanti
2005	Late Madan Mohan	Veer-Zaara
2004	Shankar–Ehsaan–Loy	Kal Ho Naa Ho
2003	A. R. Rahman	Saathiya
2002	A. R. Rahman	Lagaan
2001	Rajesh Roshan	Kaho Naa... Pyaar Hai
2000	A. R. Rahman	Taal
1999	Jatin–Lalit	Kuch Kuch Hota Hai

=== Best Singer Male ===
Year	Singer	Film	Song
2007	Shaan	Fanaa	"Chand Sifarish"
2006	Himesh Reshammiya	Aashiq Banaya Aapne	"Aashiq Banaya Aapne"
2005	Kunal Ganjawala	Murder	"Bheege Honth Tere"
2004	Shankar Mahadevan	Kal Ho Na Ho	"Pretty Woman"
2003	Sukhwinder Singh	The Legend of Bhagat Singh	"Pagdi Sambhal"
2002	Shankar Mahadevan	Dil Chahta Hai	"Dil Chahta Hai"
2001	Lucky Ali	Kaho Na Pyar Hai	"Na Tum Jaano"
2000	Kumar Sanu	Hum Dil De Chuke Sanam	"Aankhon Ki Gustakhiyan"
1999	Udit Narayan	Kuch Kuch Hota Hai	"Kuch Kuch Hota Hai"

=== Best Singer Female ===
Year	Singer	Film	Song
2007	Alka Yagnik	Kabhi Alvida Naa Kehna	"Kabhi Alvida Naa Kehna"
2006	Alisha Chinoy	Bunty Aur Babli	"Kajra Re"
2005	Sunidhi Chauhan	Dhoom	"Dhoom Machale"
2004	K. S. Chitra	Koi Mil Gaya	"Koi Mil Gaya"
2003	Richa Sharma	Kaante	"Maahi Ve"
2002	Alka Yagnik	Asoka	"San San Sana"
2001	Alka Yagnik	Kaho Naa... Pyaar Hai	"Kaho Naa... Pyaar Hai"
2000
1999	Alka Yagnik	Kuch Kuch Hota Hai	"Kuch Kuch Hota Hai"

=== Best Costume Designer ===
Year	Designer	Film
2007	Manish Malhotra	Kabhi Alvida Naa Kehna
2006	Manish Malhotra	Kaal
2005	Manish Malhotra	Veer-Zaara
2004	Manish Malhotra	Kal Ho Naa Ho
2003	Neeta Lulla	Devdas
2002
2001	Neeta Lulla	Mission Kashmir
2000
1999	Manish Malhotra	Kuch Kuch Hota Hai

=== Best Choreography ===
Year	Choreographer	Film
2007	Shiamak Davar	Dhoom 2
2006	Vaibhavi Merchant	Bunty Aur Babli
2005	Farah Khan	Main Hoon Na
2004	Farah Khan	Koi Mil Gaya
2003	Saroj Khan	Devdas
2002	Farah Khan	Kabhi Khushi Kabhie Gham
2001	Ganesh Hegde	Fiza
2000
1999	Farah Khan	Kuch Kuch Hota Hai

=== Best Story ===
Year	Film	Producer
2007	Lage Raho Munna Bhai	Rajkumar Hirani & Abhijat Joshi

=== Best Dialogue ===
Year	Winner	Film
2007	Rajkumar Hirani	Lage Raho Munna Bhai

== See also ==
- Cinema of India
- List of film awards
