= The Manish Malhotra Show =

- Created by: Manish Malhotra
- Presented by: Manish Malhotra
- Country of origin: India
- Original language: Hindi

Production
- Running time: 27 minutes

Original release
- Network: Zoom
- Release: 2005

The Manish Malhotra Show is an Indian talk show hosted by fashion designer Manish Malhotra, which premiered in 2005 on zOOm channel. The series was later syndicated on TV Asia USA.

The show features celebrity guests, industry moviemakers, and fashion tips. Some of the celebrities that have appeared on the show are: Sridevi, Urmila Matondkar, Smriti Irani, and so on.
