= Fardeen Khan =

Indian actor (born 1974)

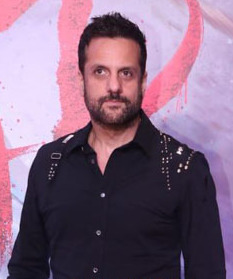
- Khan in 2021
- Born: 8 March 1974 (age 52); Mumbai, Maharashtra, India
- Occupation: Actor
- Years active: 1998–2010; 2024–present
- Spouse: Natasha Madhvani (m. 2005)
- Children: 2
- Parent: Feroz Khan (father)
- Relatives: Sanjay Khan (uncle); Akbar Khan (uncle); Zayed Khan (cousin); Sussanne Khan (cousin)
- Family: Feroz Khan family

Fardeen Khan (/ˈfɑːrðiːn/; born 8 March 1974) is an Indian actor who mainly works in Hindi films. Born to actor and film producer Feroz Khan, he is part of the Khan family. He made his acting debut with Prem Aggan (1998), for which he won the Filmfare Award for Best Male Debut.

Khan went onto star in the films Jungle (2000), Pyaar Tune Kya Kiya (2001), Bhoot (2003), Dev (2004), No Entry (2005), and All the Best (2009). After a career decline with several critical and commercial failures, he appeared in Dulha Mil Gaya (2010), following which, he took a break from acting. Khan marked his comeback with the period drama series Heeramandi (2024) and had commercial success with Raja Shivaji (2026).

== Early life and education ==
Fardeen Khan was born on 8 March 1974 in Mumbai. He is the son of Bollywood actor, director, and producer Feroz Khan. Through his father, he is of mixed Pashtun and Persian descent, while his mother is a Sindhi Hindu. Khan is the nephew of actors Sanjay Khan and Akbar Khan and the cousin of fashion designer Suzanne Khan and actor Zayed Khan.

After graduating in business management from the University of Massachusetts Amherst, Khan returned to India to pursue a career in film and trained in acting at the Kishore Namit Kapoor Acting Institute.

== Career ==
=== Early work (1998–2002) ===
Khan made his acting debut in 1998 with a leading role in the romance film Prem Aggan, which garnered him the Filmfare Best Debut Award. He then starred in the survival thriller Jungle, in 2000. Rediff.com wrote, "Fardeen redeems himself, after the disaster that was Prem Aggan."

His career marked a turning point after he received critical recognition for the 2001 romantic thriller Pyaar Tune Kya Kiya. Screen magazine noted, "Fardeen Khan as the happy-go-lucky photographer, is pleasing on the eye, light footed and comfortable with the part." His other films of the year were the crime comedy Love Ke Liye Kuch Bhi Karega and the romantic drama Hum Ho Gaye Aapke, both box office failures. Khan had three releases in 2002: Kitne Door Kitne Paas, Kuch Tum Kaho Kuch Hum Kahein, and Om Jai Jagadish.

=== Career progression, acclaim, and hiatus (2003–2023) ===
Khan again worked on three projects in 2003. The romantic comedy Khushi and the romantic thriller Janasheen both failed at the box office. For Khushi, Bollywood Hungama praised his performance and noted, "Fardeen Khan's performance is a revelation. The actor not only looks smashing, but does an equally smashing job in emotional sequences mainly, which were his weak points earlier." The supernatural horror Bhoot was his only successful film that year. Film critic Taran Adarsh wrote, "Fardeen Khan registers an impact in a small but significant role."

Khan received critical acclaim for both his films in 2004. In Dev, he played a misguided law graduate. Bollywood Hungama noted, "Fardeen Khan springs a surprise by enacting a difficult role with flourish. His scenes with the two veterans are proof enough that the youngster has evolved into a fine actor." Rediff.com wrote, "Fardeen portrays the transformation of the innocent but troubled youngster to jihadi sharpshooter with conviction." He next played a hacker and thief in Fida. Rediff.com stated, "Fardeen is his usual suave self."

Khan had his career's highest grosser in 2005, with No Entry, which became the highest-grossing film of 2005. Planet Bollywood noted, "Fardeen Khan shows a great flair for comedy at his first attempt. He shares stellar situations with Anil Kapoor in the latter half of the film." He went on to appear in Heyy Babyy (2007), Life Partner (2009), and All the Best: Fun Begins (2009), among others.

In 2010, after his last starring role, in Dulha Mil Gaya, Khan took a break from the movie business in order to focus on his family. In December 2020, speculation arose that he may be planning a comeback to acting after being spotted outside the office of film director Mukesh Chhabra. Chhabra later confirmed that the two were exploring opportunities and that they would begin working on a new project in 2021.

=== Return to acting (2024–present) ===
In 2024, Khan made his return to acting with the web series Heeramandi, which premiered on Netflix. Dhaval Roy of The Times of India stated that Khan made a "strong impression" with his performance. Khan subsequently returned to the screen with Khel Khel Mein, where he played a cricket coach. Despite a positive response, the film was a box-office bomb. Vinamra Mathur of Firstpost expressed appreciation for Khan's "sensitive and mature performance". In his last release of the year, Visfot, Khan played a taxi driver.

In 2025, Khan played a billionaire's son in Housefull 5.

== Personal life ==
Fardeen is married to Natasha Madhvani, daughter of actress Mumtaz. The couple has a daughter and a son.

In May 2001, Khan was arrested for attempting to buy cocaine.

== Filmography ==
=== Film ===
Year	Title	Role	Notes	Ref.
1998	Prem Aggan	Suraj Singh		
2000	Jungle	Siddharth "Siddhu" Mishra		
2001	Pyaar Tune Kya Kiya	Jai Bhatt		
2001	Love Ke Liye Kuch Bhi Karega	Rahul Kapoor / Khalid Muhammad		
2001	Hum Ho Gaye Aapke	Rishi Oberoi		
2002	Kitne Door Kitne Paas	Jatin		
2002	Kuch Tum Kaho Kuch Hum Kahein	Abhay Indra Vishnu Pratap Singh		
2002	Om Jai Jagadish	Jai Batra		
2003	Khushi	Karan Roy		
2003	Bhoot	Sanjay Thakker		
2003	Janasheen	Lucky Kapoor		
2004	Dev	Farhaan Ali		
2004	Fida	Vikram Singh		
2005	No Entry	Shekhar "Sunny" Wani		
2005	Shaadi No. 1	Raj Mittal		
2005	Ek Khiladi Ek Haseena	Arjun Verma		
2006	Pyare Mohan	Pyare		
2006	Aryan	Sameer	Cameo	
2007	Just Married	Abhay Sachdeva		
2007	Heyy Babyy	Ali Haydar		
2007	Darling	Aditya Soman		
2009	Jai Veeru	Jai Mehra		
2009	Life Partner	Karan Malhotra		
2009	Acid Factory	Romeo		
2009	All the Best: Fun Begins	Veer Kapoor		
2010	Dulha Mil Gaya	Tej "Donsai" Dhanraj		
2024	Khel Khel Mein	Kabir Deshmukh		
2024	Visfot	Shoaib Khan		
2025	Housefull 5	Dev Dobriyal		
2026	Raja Shivaji	Shah Jahan	Marathi-Hindi bilingual film	
2027	Police Company †	TBA	Filming	

=== Television ===
Year	Title	Role	Notes	Ref.
2024	Heeramandi	Wali Muhammad	Netflix series	

== Awards and nominations ==
Year	Award	Category	Film	Result	Ref.
1999	Bollywood Movie Awards	Best Male Debut	Prem Aggan	Won	
1999	Filmfare Awards	Best Male Debut	Prem Aggan	Won	
1999	Zee Cine Awards	Best Male Debut	Prem Aggan	Nominated	
2001	Bollywood Movie Awards	Most Sensational Actor	Pyaar Tune Kya Kiya	Nominated	
2001	Screen Awards	Jodi No. 1 (with Urmila Matondkar)	Pyaar Tune Kya Kiya	Nominated	
2005	Stardust Awards	Best Supporting Actor	Fida	Nominated	
2006	Zee Cine Awards	Best Actor in a Supporting Role – Male	No Entry	Nominated	
2025	Iconic Gold Awards	Best Supporting Actor – Comedy	Khel Khel Mein	Won	
2025	International Indian Film Academy Awards	Best Supporting Actor	Khel Khel Mein	Nominated	
