= Shabbir Masani =

Indian actor

Sabir Masani
- Occupation: Indian actor

Sabir Masani is an Indian actor who played the role of Yeda in Satya and similar small and significant roles in Asoka, Company and Bhoot.

== Filmography ==
Year	Film	Role	Notes	Ref.
1998	Satya	Yedaa		
1998	Dil Se..	Terrorist		
2001	Asoka			
2002	Company	David Khan		
2003	Bhoot	Watchman		
