= Karm =

- Poster
- Directed by: B.R. Chopra
- Produced by: B.R. Chopra
- Starring: Rajesh Khanna; Vidya Sinha; Shabana Azmi; Master Bittoo; Urmila Matondkar
- Music by: R. D. Burman
- Release date: 29 April 1977
- Country: India
- Language: Hindi

Karm (lit. 'Deed') is a 1977 Hindi movie produced and directed by B. R. Chopra. The film stars Rajesh Khanna, Vidya Sinha, Shabana Azmi, Urmila Matondkar and Master Bittoo. The songs written by Rajkavi Inderjeet Singh Tulsi and music given by R. D. Burman. This film was the first film of Matondkar as a child artist.

== Plot ==
Retired Judge Shyamlal Kumar lives in a palatial home with his wife and only son, Arvind, who is studying law to become a lawyer. Arvind meets the beautiful Asha Shastri, and they fall in love. Asha introduces Arvind to her astrologer father, Chintamani, who instantly approves of Arvind, as Arvind's parents do of Asha. But when Chintamani sees a dark future for the young couple, he withdraws his blessings and asks them not to marry. Spooked by this, Shyamlal and his wife also ask Arvind to marry someone else, but Arvind and Asha start living together. This causes anger in their conservative community, and both are blacklisted. Asha becomes pregnant, but does not know that Arvind has met a young woman named Neelam Shukla, who believes that Arvind is a bachelor and wants to marry him.

Saddened by her father's death and his last warning that Asha should not touch his dead body, pregnant Asha leaves Arvind to go into oblivion at Haridwar. She meets Swamiji there and resides at his ashram. There, she gives birth to a son and works as a nurse in Dehradun. Meanwhile, Arvind gives in to his parents' wish to marry Neelam and moves to London for future studies with her. Both return after five years and in the turn of events, Judge Arvind shifts to Dehradun and unknowingly contacts his own son. Neelam's pregnancy becomes complicated and the doctors could not save their child. Neelam cannot bear a child again.

Arvind meets Asha (now Sadhna) in the same hospital. He enquires about his son and finally would like to adopt him. When Asha gives in to her husband's wish, the boy goes to Arvind and Neelam's home with a letter. After reading the letter, Neelam is infuriated. She returns the boy to Asha and drives madly back to their home. Arvind tries to explain things to her while she is recklessly driving, but it is of no help. Neelam rams the car into a running train; seriously injuring both Arvind and herself. She dies after listening to Arvind and Asha's story. Arvind is brought to the hospital on the verge of death. He fills sindoor in front of God in the hospital and marries Asha, thinking that he will soon die anyway. The doctor takes him to the operation theatre. Asha along with her son and Swamiji prays to Lord Shiva. After the operation Arvind is in a critical condition in the ICU. Arvind survives and regains consciousness.

== Cast ==
- Rajesh Khanna as Arvind
- Vidya Sinha as Asha Shastri/Sadhna
- Shabana Azmi as Neelam
- Asrani
- Kumari Naaz
- Manmohan Krishna
- Pinchoo Kapoor as Neelam's father
- Om Shivpuri as Sawami
- Master Bittoo
- Urmila Matondkar

== Soundtrack ==
Songs were written by Rajkavi Inderjeet Singh Tulsi and Bharat Vyas.

#	Title	Singer(s)
1	"Samay Tu Dheere Dheere Chal" wrtin by Rajkavi Inderjeet Singh Tulsi	Kishore Kumar, Asha Bhosle
2	"Main Ne Dekha Tujhe"	Kishore Kumar, Asha Bhosle
3	"Samay Tu Jaldi Jaldi Chal"	Kishore Kumar, Asha Bhosle
4	"Jab Charon Taraf Andhera Ho"	Mahendra Kapoor, Asha Bhosle
5	"Jab Dukh Se Man Ghabra Jaye"	Mahendra Kapoor
6	"Karm Kaho Qismat Kaho"	Mukesh
7	"Karm Kare Qismat Bane"	Mukesh
