= Dance Maharashtra Dance =

Marathi TV dance reality show

- Presented by: Sandeep Pathak; Vaibhav Mangle
- Judges: Urmila Matondkar, Gashmeer Mahajani, Sonalee Kulkarni
- Country of origin: India
- Original language: Marathi
- No. of seasons: 3

Production
- Production locations: Mumbai, Maharashtra
- Camera setup: Multi-camera
- Running time: 45–60 minutes

Original release
- Network: Zee Marathi; Zee Yuva
- Release: 17 December 2012 – 28 October 2022

Related
- Dance India Dance; Dance Bangla Dance

Dance Maharashtra Dance is an Indian television dance reality show in Marathi language originally aired on Zee Marathi. It was hosted by Sandeep Pathak and Vaibhav Mangle. Urmila Matondkar was the main judge of first season. Gashmeer Mahajani and Sonalee Kulkarni were the judges of the Little Masters season. It was premiered from 17 December 2012 and stopped on 28 October 2022 aired with 3 seasons.

== Seasons ==
Season	Originally Broadcast		Days	Name	Ref.
Season	First aired	Last aired	Days	Name	Ref.
1	17 December 2012	17 March 2013	Mon-Tue	Season 1	
2	24 January 2018	10 June 2018	Wed-Thu	Zee Yuva	
3	27 July 2022	28 October 2022	Wed-Thu	Little Masters	
