= Hum Tum Pe Marte Hain =

- Directed by: Nabh Kumar 'Raju'
- Written by: Nabh Kumar 'Raju'
- Starring: Govinda; Urmila Matondkar
- Music by: Uttam Singh
- Release date: 17 September 1999
- Country: India
- Language: Hindi

Hum Tum Pe Marte Hain is a 1999 Indian Hindi-language romantic comedy film directed by Nabh Kumar 'Raju'. The music for the movie was composed by Uttam Singh, with lyrics by Anand Bakshi. The movie was shot in Manipal and Udupi, Karnataka. The film was a box office failure.

== Plot ==
The story of the film revolves around two neighboring families. One family is headed by Sethji and the other by Devyani. Rahul is Sethji's son. He has just returned to his native town after completing his studies. Radhika, is Devyani's sister-in-law, recently arrived from the village. Sethji considers Radhika his lucky charm, as whenever he sees her, he either wins the chess game with his brother or something auspicious takes place. Radhika and Rahul, predictably, fall in love. Devyani is impressed with her business associate, Dhananjay, who makes iconic entry from helicopter with background music "down down diki diki down". She is also aware of Rahul and Radhika's clandestine meetings, so she offers Radhika's hand in marriage to Dhananjay, who delightedly accepts. Rahul has to prove his love to Devyani.

== Cast ==
- Govinda as Rahul Kumar
- Urmila Matondkar as Radhika
- Dimple Kapadia as Devyani
- Paresh Rawal as Shiv Kumar
- Johnny Lever as Sattu
- Gulshan Grover as Udhed Singh
- Nirmal Pandey as Dhananjay
- Himani Shivpuri as Uma
- Sheetal Bedi as an item number "Hum banjaare"

== Soundtrack ==
The music for the movie was composed by Uttam Singh, and lyrics were written by Anand Bakshi.

#	Title	Singer(s)
1	"Hum Tum Pe Marte Hain"	Lata Mangeshkar and Udit Narayan
2	"Jaa Rahe Ho Tum"	Udit Narayan
3	"O Mere Daddy"	Udit Narayan, Hariharan
4	"Duniya Se Kuchh Lo"	Udit Narayan, Amit Kumar
5	"Hum Banjaare Ho"	Udit Narayan, Shobha Joshi
6	"Ladki Ko Ladka Pasand Nahin"	Udit Narayan
7	"O Mere Bitwa"	Hariharan & Udit Narayan
8	"Pyar Mein Door Kya"	Lata Mangeshkar and Udit Narayan
9	"Hum Tum Pe Marte Hain"	Instrumental
