= Jai Maharashtra =

Jai Maharashtra may refer to:

- Jai Maharashtra (slogan), a patriotic slogan widely used to express pride and unity in the Indian state of Maharashtra
- Jai Maharashtra (TV channel), a 24/7 Marathi news channel
- Jai Maharashtra Dhaba Bhatinda, a 2013 Marathi film by Avadhoot Gupte
