= Bas Ek Pal =

2006 film directed by Onir

- Directed by: Onir
- Written by: Irene Dhar Malik; Onir; Ashwini Malik (Dialogues)
- Produced by: Manohar P. Kanungo; Shailesh R. Singh
- Starring: Juhi Chawla; Urmila Matondkar; Jimmy Sheirgill; Sanjay Suri; Rehaan Engineer; Yashpal Sharma
- Cinematography: Sachin K. Krishn
- Edited by: Irene Dhar Malik
- Music by: Songs: Vivek Philip; Mithoon; Pritam (1 song); Score: Vivek Philip; Prasad Sashte
- Distributed by: Viacom18 Motion Pictures
- Release date: 15 September 2006
- Country: India
- Language: Hindi

Bas Ek Pal (transl. Just a moment) is a 2006 Indian Hindi-language romantic crime thriller film directed by Onir. It stars Juhi Chawla, Sanjay Suri, and Urmila Matondkar with Jimmy Sheirgill, Rehaan Engineer, and Yashpal Sharma in supporting roles. The film's storyline is an adaptation of Live Flesh, a film by Pedro Almodóvar.

== Plot ==
Nikhil Kapoor decides to return from the US to Mumbai. When he arrives, he visits nightclub and there meets a woman and instantly falls for her; she, however, does ot even introduce herself. After he asks her name, she goes away. The next day, Nikhil meets his old friend Rahul. The two play basketball and hang out together. Whilst in the company of Rahul and Steve (Rehaan Engineer), another one of Nikhil's friends shows up again, and she is revealed to be Anamika Joshi. She walks in with her friend Farhad, and when Nikhil tries to talk to Anamika, Farhad begins to think he is flirting with or disturbing her, and they fight.

Naturally, Rahul and Steve join in as well. Farhad draws a gun impulsively, and Nikhil snatches it from him, pointing it towards him. In the ensuing scuffle, while Steve tries to stop Nikhil by holding him from behind and Rahul tries to draw Farhad away, a bullet is accidentally shot by Nikhil, hitting Rahul in the back. Steve flees in panic. Anamika also disappears. Farhad flees to Australia. The police arrive at the scene and arrest Nikhil. Rahul is paralysed and loses the use of his legs. When Nikhil is kept in a cell by the police for shooting at Rahul, he tells them to ask Rahul himself, who refuses to speak with him. Also, Nikhil has no way to contact Anamika to prove his innocence. Three years after having been imprisoned, Ira Malhotra hears his side of the story and helps bail him out. Now Nikhil meets Rahul and Anamika and eventually learns that he was lured into a trap by someone who is still at large. Eventually, it turns out that Ira and Rahul were having an affair, and Steve learned of it. In order to teach Rahul a lesson that night at the party, he pressed the trigger while he was trying to stop Nikhil, with the gun in Nikhil's hand, making it look like Nikhil had done this. Ira knew this all along, and that is why she helped Nikhil get bailed out. She tries to leave Steve and comes to Nikhil, where an angry Steve confronts both of them and threatens them with a gun. Steve shoots Nikhil, fatally wounding him. Ira holds herself responsible for whatever wrong has happened to Nikhil and shoots herself, leaving Steve shocked and repenting. Steve kills himself.

Anamika and Rahul, fearing the worst, reach Nikhil's house, where a dying Nikhil finally succumbs in Anamika's lap. The movie ends with both Anamika and Rahul standing together, silently looking towards the sunset.

== Cast ==
- Juhi Chawla as Ira Malhotra
- Urmila Matondkar as Anamika Joshi
- Jimmy Sheirgill as Rahul Kher
- Sanjay Suri as Nikhil Kapoor
- Rehaan Engineer as Steve O'Brien
- Yashpal Sharma as Swamy
- Chetan Pandit as Chandu Bhai
- KK as himself (cameo appearance)
- Sunidhi Chauhan as herself (cameo appearance)
- Atif Aslam as Himself

== Music ==
Bas Ek Pal

Soundtrack album by Vivek Philip, Mithoon and Pritam
- Released: 15 September 2006 (India)
- Recorded: July – August 2006
- Genre: Feature film soundtrack
- Label: Tips Music Films

The Bas Ek Pal album contains nine songs; three of them are remixes. The soundtrack is notable for its Western flavour, being generally praised by critics. The song "Tere Bin" was voted as one of the best songs of 2006. The soundtrack was released on a two-channel compact disc and cassette tape and received good reviews from critics.

| No. | Title | Lyrics | Music | Singer(s) | Length |
|---|---|---|---|---|---|
| 1. | "Hai Ishq Ye Kya Ek Khata" | Amitabh Verma | Pritam | KK, Sunidhi Chauhan | 4:22 |
| 2. | "Tere Bin" | Sayeed Qadri | Mithoon | Atif Aslam | 4:35 |
| 3. | "Zindagi Hosh Mein" | Amitabh Verma | Vivek Philip | KK, Zubeen Garg | 4:37 |
| 4. | "Bas Ek Pal" | Mithoon | Mithoon | KK, Dominique Cerejo | 5:36 |
| 5. | "Ashq Bhi" | Amitabh Verma | Vivek Philip | KK, Sunidhi Chauhan | 4:21 |
| 6. | "Dheemey Dheemey" | Amitabh Verma | Vivek Philip | KK, Sunidhi Chauhan | 5:20 |
| 7. | "Bas Ek Pal (Remix)" | Mithoon | Mithoon | KK, Dominique Cerejo | 4:39 |
| 8. | "Tere Bin (Remix)" | Sayeed Qadri | Mithoon, Eric Pillai | Atif Aslam | 3:43 |
| 9. | "Zindagi Hosh Mein (Remix)" | Amitabh Verma | Vivek Philip, Eric Pillai | Zubeen Garg | 5:12 |

== Reception ==
Taran Adarsh wrote, "On the whole, BAS EK PAL is an uninteresting fare. At the box-office, the film has precious little to offer to the multiplex audience, but nothing for the masses".
