= Maine Gandhi Ko Nahin Mara =

- DVD cover
- Directed by: Jahnu Barua
- Written by: Jahnu Barua; Sanjay Chauhan
- Produced by: Anupam Kher
- Starring: Anupam Kher; Urmila Matondkar; Rajit Kapur; Parvin Dabas
- Cinematography: Raaj Chakravarti
- Edited by: Deepa Bhatia
- Music by: Bappi Lahiri; Bappa B. Lahiri
- Distributed by: Yash Raj Films
- Release date: 30 September 2005
- Country: India
- Language: Hindi

Maine Gandhi Ko Nahin Mara (transl. I Did Not Kill Gandhi) is a 2005 Indian Hindi-language drama film, directed by Jahnu Barua and produced by Anupam Kher. The film stars Anupam Kher and Urmila Matondkar.

== Plot ==
The film explores the downward spiral of a retired Hindi professor, Uttam Chaudhary, as he falls victim to dementia. After he sees someone carelessly place an ashtray on a newspaper photograph of Mohandas Gandhi, his dementia symptoms get worse. One night his daughter Trisha, played by Urmila Matondkar, and son Karan discover his room on fire. Trisha takes him to a doctor who says nothing can be done.

Then Uttam believes that he killed Gandhi by accidentally playing with a toy gun that had real bullets and shooting Gandhi during his walk in Birla House. So they go see Uttam's brother for details. Uttam's brother says that when they were young, they played darts by filling balloons with red dye and placing them on someone's picture.

One day someone found Gandhi's picture, and Uttam popped a balloon on it while their father saw who believed he killed Gandhi, with Uttam replying "Maine Gandhi Ko Nahin Mara" while his father hit him. Later they go to another doctor named Siddharth, who helps Uttam when he thinks that his house is a jail, and people poisoned his food because he killed Gandhi. Siddharth eats the food, so Uttam knows the food is not poisoned. Later, in court, a gun expert says that a toy gun (which Uttam believes he killed Gandhi with) cannot kill anyone.

== Cast ==
- Anupam Kher as Professor Uttam Chaudhary
- Urmila Matondkar as Trisha Chaudhary
- Rajit Kapur as Ronu Chaudhary
- Parvin Dabas as Dr. Siddharth Kothari
- Prem Chopra as Dr. Verma
- Waheeda Rahman as Principal Sunita Khanna
- Boman Irani as Public Prosecutor / Stage Actor
- Sudhir Joshi as Advocate Joshi (also a stage actor)
- Raju Kher as Gattu Chacha, Uttam's childhood friend
- Vishwas Paandya
- Nazneen Ghaani
- Danica Apolline as charity worker

== Reception ==
Sukanya Verma of Rediff.com called the film "a masterpiece." She further wrote, "Technically, Maine Gandhi Ko Nahin Maara stands out for its flawless photography by Raaj A Chakarvarthy. The imagery of his shots have their own silent tale to tell. If you think Bappi Lahiri is all about disco, his soulful background score has the last laugh." Jaspreet Pandohar of BBC.com gave the film 4 out of 5, writing, "Realistic and refreshing in approach, Maine Gandhi Ko Nahin Mara is the kind of thought-provoking, non-musical film Bollywood is capable of making but sadly rarely does. It's only thanks to Kher's efforts as lead actor and producer that neglected issues like senile dementia and the erosion of Gandhian ideologies in contemporary India have made it to the big screen. Boasting mature treatment from Barua, and a moving performance by Kher as an intellectual who becomes a prisoner of his own mind, this movie has the potential to appeal to diverse audiences."

Conversely, Taran Adarsh of IndiaFM gave the film 1 out of 5, writing, "On the whole, MAINE GANDHI KO NAHIN MARA is the kind of cinema that may meet with diverse reactions. While the critics, the festival circuit and mature audiences [a tiny segment of moviegoers] may go for it, the majority might find the experience too theatrical."

Anupam Kher won a Special Jury Award at the 53rd National Film Awards. He also received awards at several international film festivals. Matondkar was also much appreciated for playing the caring daughter of Kher and won the Bollywood Movie Award - Best Actress for her performance.

== See also ==
- List of artistic depictions of Mohandas Karamchand Gandhi
