= Bhoot (film) =

2003 Indian film by Ram Gopal Varma

- Directed by: Ram Gopal Varma
- Written by: Ram Gopal Varma
- Produced by: Nitin Manmohan
- Starring: Ajay Devgn; Urmila Matondkar; Nana Patekar; Rekha; Tanuja; Fardeen Khan; Seema Biswas
- Cinematography: Vishal Sinha
- Edited by: Shimit Amin
- Music by: Songs: Salim–Sulaiman; Amar Mohile; Anand Raaj Anand; Bapi-Tutul; Background Score: Salim–Sulaiman
- Release date: 30 May 2003
- Running time: 111 minutes
- Country: India
- Language: Hindi
- Budget: ₹67 million
- Box office: ₹239 million

Bhoot (transl. Ghost) is a 2003 Indian Hindi-language supernatural horror film directed by Ram Gopal Varma and stars an ensemble cast of Ajay Devgn, Urmila Matondkar, Nana Patekar, Rekha, Fardeen Khan, Tanuja, and Seema Biswas. It is the second horror film made by Ram Gopal Verma after Raat. The film was perceived to be different from a typical Hindi film as it did not feature the songs composed for it. The film was later dubbed in Telugu as 12 Va Anthasthu and remade in Tamil as Shock.

Bhoot was a box-office hit. Urmila won several accolades and awards for her performance as a possessed wife. Over the years, it has been considered one of the best Bollywood horror films of all time. Verma made a sequel called Bhoot Returns which was released on 12 October 2012.

== Plot ==
The story follows Vishal Bhatia (Ajay Devgn), an investment adviser married to Swati Bhatia (Urmila Matondkar). The couple rent a high-rise apartment at an unusually low price. The broker introduces Vishal to the owner, Mr Thakkar (Amar Talwar), and explains that a widow named Manjeet Khosla (Barkha Madan), the previous resident, committed suicide after killing her own son. Vishal conceals this information from Swati, knowing she would object to living in such a place. However, the owner accidentally reveals the secret.

Swati is extremely upset with Vishal for hiding the truth about the previous occupants, although he dismisses notions of ghosts and bad luck. She soon begins seeing things and behaving strangely. Vishal consults Dr Rajan (Victor Banerjee). By this point, it becomes apparent that Swati is possessed, although Vishal believes she is merely sleepwalking. One night, he notices Swati is missing from the apartment. While searching for her, he sees her emerging from the lift. Sensing something is wrong, Vishal goes to the ground floor and discovers the watchman, murdered with his neck snapped backwards, implying that the possessed Swati killed him. Vishal’s scepticism vanishes. Inspector Liyaqat Qureshi (Nana Patekar), who arrives to investigate the death, grows suspicious of the couple and their unusual behaviour, and begins following Vishal and Dr Rajan.

Vishal’s maid witnesses Swati shouting and hurling Vishal aside. She helps restrain her and notes that Swati is shouting in the same manner as Manjeet. She suggests consulting an exorcist rather than a doctor. Vishal eventually seeks help from an exorcist, Sarita (Rekha). Sarita perceives the spirits of Manjeet and her son and advises Vishal to meet Manjeet’s mother (Tanuja), who may be able to placate her daughter’s spirit. Vishal complies and learns that Manjeet was not the kind of person who would commit suicide or kill her own child. He explains Swati’s condition and asks for assistance. Manjeet’s mother accompanies him and attempts to calm her daughter’s spirit. They discover that Mr Thakkar’s son, Sanjay Thakkar (Fardeen Khan), attempted to molest Manjeet; when she resisted, she accidentally fell from the balcony and died. Sarita advises Vishal to summon Sanjay. Vishal lures him by falsely claiming that his father is ill. When Sanjay arrives, Vishal persuades both him and Mr Thakkar to help take Swati to the hospital.

It is then revealed that years earlier, Sanjay visited his father and became infatuated with Manjeet upon seeing her in the apartment. He broke into her home and attempted to express his desire. When she rejected him, he pushed her, causing her to fall from the balcony and die. Manjeet’s young son witnessed the crime, and Sanjay subsequently hired the watchman to kill the boy.

Manjeet, still possessing Swati’s body, sees Sanjay and chases him. Qureshi attempts to stop her, unaware of the truth. Swati tries to kill Sanjay by strangling him, but Sarita intervenes, urging Manjeet to spare him, as Swati would otherwise be blamed.

Sanjay escapes, only to find himself surrounded by Vishal, Sarita, Manjeet’s spirit, and Qureshi, who now understand the truth. Terrified, Sanjay confesses his crimes, prompting Manjeet’s mother to urge her daughter to stop. Inspector Qureshi arrests Sanjay and has him imprisoned. Manjeet’s spirit leaves Swati’s body, and Vishal and Swati begin a new life together in the apartment. Meanwhile, in the lock-up, Qureshi tells Sanjay that even a death sentence would be too lenient for someone like him, and that he deserves a harsher punishment. After Qureshi leaves the darkened cell, Sanjay finds himself face to face with Manjeet. He begs for mercy, but his voice fades as she approaches; it is implied that she kills him.

== Cast ==
- Ajay Devgn as Vishal Bhatia
- Urmila Matondkar as Swati Bhatia
- Nana Patekar as Inspector Liyaqat Qureshi
- Fardeen Khan as Sanjay Thakker
- Rekha as Sarita
- Victor Banerjee as Dr. Rajan
- Tanuja as Mrs. Khosla
- Seema Biswas as Bai
- Amar Talwar as Mr. Thakker
- Barkha Madan as Manjeet Khosla
- Shabbir Masani as Watchman
- Master Akshit as Manjeet's son
- Peeya Rai Chowdhary as Peeya, Dr. Rajan's daughter
- Sunidhi Chauhan (special appearance)

== Soundtrack ==
The soundtrack is under the label T-Series. The music of the film was composed by Salim–Sulaiman. It consists of 7 songs, 1 remix and an instrumental. The whole soundtrack is not used in the movie, except the song "Ghor Andhere" for the ending credits. The song "Bhoot Hoon Main" was recreated in film Lupt, which will be showing Nataša Stanković

=== Track listing ===
Track listing
No.	Title	Lyrics	Music	Singer(s)	Length
1.	"Bhoot Hoon Main" (Remix)	Lalit Marathe	Salim–Sulaiman	Sunidhi Chauhan, Vijay Prakash, Salim Merchant	3:31
2.	"Bhoot Hai Yahan Koi"	Jaideep Sahni	Amar Mohile	Asha Bhosle	4:57
3.	"Ghor Andhere"	Mahathi Prakash	Salim–Sulaiman	Sunidhi Chauhan, Vijay Prakash, Clinton Cerejo, Salim Merchant	5:08
4.	"Yeh Sard"		Anand Raj Anand	Instrumental	5:22
5.	"Bhoot Hai Yahan Koi"	Jaideep Sahni	Amar Mohile	Gayatri Iyer	4:10
6.	"Dead But Not Asleep"		Amar Mohile	Asha Bhosle	2:25
7.	"Bhoot Hoon Main"	Lalit Marathe	Salim–Sulaiman	Sunidhi Chauhan, Vijay Prakash, Salim Merchant	3:36
8.	"Din Hai Na Ye Raat"	Sandeep Nath	Bapi-Tutul	Usha Uthup, Pervez Qadir	3:35
9.	"Yeh Sard"	Praveen Bhardwaj	Anand Raj Anand	Gayatri Iyer, Anand Raj Anand	5:22

== Production ==
Bhoot is Director Ram Gopal Varma's second horror film after Raat (1992), starring Revathi. He said about the film, "Though technically it is a horror film, we don't see a murder or any overt horror." Further calling it a "hold-on-to-your-seats horror film", he said he wanted to break the stereotypes of a typical Indian horror of "a woman in a white sari, mists and screeching." He expressed his intentions of bringing horror "to [audiences] homes in the middle of Mumbai." He believed that since horror films were expected to happen mostly in a graveyard or a haunted house on a hill station, their happening in a place where no one really expected a ghost would be scary. Terming the film a remake of Raat in some sense, and citing The Exorcist as a huge influence on Bhoot, Varma also included a message at the beginning of the film where he cautioned pregnant women and people with weak hearts to view it at their own risk. The film creates terror through sound and everyday objects.

== Critical reception ==
Taran Adarsh wrote about Matondkar's performance,

"...the film clearly belongs to Urmila Matondkar all the way. To state that she is excellent would be doing gross injustice to her work. Sequences when she is possessed are simply astounding. If this performance doesn't deserve an award, no other performance should. It beats all competition hollow."

Narendra Kusnur of Mid-Day was similarly positive of Matondkar, writing that her "transformation from a simple woman to a possessed spirit is smooth, and she emotes fear very naturally," and concluded:

"Despite many shortcomings, Bhoot scores in terms of its sincere directorial effort, the unusual script (Sameer Sharma and Lalit Marathe), the sharp photography (Vishal Sinha), the absence of unwanted songs and some commendable displays of acting prowess."

Deepa Gumaste of Rediff.com mentioned that Bhoot gave her the same experience of terror as in Cape Fear (1991) and said:

"I wondered if I'd get out of the cinema hall alive. Already, the sleek title sequence, with its astonishing visual effects and stunning background score, had me trembling with trepidation."

Anita Gates of The New York Times noted, "...at some point the overdone scary music becomes part of the fun."

== Awards ==
Bollywood Movie Awards

- Bollywood Movie Award – Best Director - Ram Gopal Varma
- Bollywood Movie Award – Best Actress - Urmila Matondkar

Star Screen Awards

- Screen Award for Best Actress - Urmila Matondkar

Zee Cine Awards

- Zee Cine Award for Best Actor – Female - Urmila Matondkar

49th Filmfare Awards:

Won

- Best Actress (Critics)
- Best Editing – Shimit Amin
- Best Sound – Dwarak Warrier

Nominated

- Best Director – Ram Gopal Varma
- Best Actress – Urmila Matondkar

== Franchise ==
In 2012, producer Jitendra Jain, of Alumbra Entertainment, purchased the rights from Nitin Manmohan and produced Bhoot Returns, which was also directed by Ram Gopal Varma. However, unlike Bhoot, it received mixed-to-negative reviews, and was a box-office disaster.

== Title rights ==
Karan Johar's Dharma Productions acquired the title rights of the Bhoot film series from Ram Gopal Varma to make their own franchise, the first part of a planned trilogy Bhoot – Part One: The Haunted Ship starring Vicky Kaushal, Ashutosh Rana, and Bhumi Pednekar, directed by Bhanu Pratap Singh was released in 2020.
