= Waar Parriwar =

- The promotional logo image of "Waar Parriwar".
- Directed by: Rajeev Arora; Abhishek Dwivedi; Vibhore Ratna; Pankaj Purandare
- Presented by: Urmila Matondkar
- Country of origin: India
- No. of episodes: 45

Production
- Running time: 52 Minutes

Original release
- Network: Sony Entertainment Television
- Release: 28 April – 24 August 2008

Waar Parriwar (transl. War Family) is an Indian singing reality television show broadcast on Sony Entertainment Television in 2008. It featured Urmila Matondkar as the host, and Jatin Pandit as the in-house guru and trainer to the competing families.

== Concept ==
The show is a unique show which seamlessly blends, family bond with their love for music. It followed the journey of families from across India – their trials and tribulations, highs of victory and disappointment of defeat, their love for each other during tough times and eventually culminate in finding "Sangeet Ka Naya Gharana". The families competed against each other to win the title of best "Sangeet Ka Naya Gharana".

The show was judged by different celebrity judges each week and by India's foremost music families combined with audience voting.

- The wildcard entry took place on Monday 14 July in which Ali Ghani Parriwar and Ramshankar Parriwar (now known as Shambhu Pandit Parriwar) have won among all other participants. Misbah was the runner up and with maximum Performer of the day reward.

Grand-Finale

- Sharma Parriwar - Winner
- Ali Parriwar - Runner-up

== Celebrity judges ==
- Sneha Pant --- Special ex-host every Wednesday
- Ishita Arun --- New Host every Wednesday
- Ismail Darbar & Ayesha Darbar --- Week 1
- Shivkumar Sharma & Rahul Sharma --- Week 2
- Daler Mehndi & Mika Singh --- Week 3
- Aadesh Srivastav & Vijeta Pandit --- Week 4
- Shaan & Sonali Mukherjee --- Week 5
- Jatin Pandit & Lalit Pandit aka Jatin Lalit --- Week 6
- Udit Narayan & Aditya Narayan --- Week 7
- Bappi Lahiri & Reema Lahiri --- Week 8
- Salman Khan --- Week 8 (on Wednesday)
- Bappi Lahiri & Bappa Lahiri --- Week 9
- Roop Kumar Rathod & Sonali Rathod --- Week 10
- Kumar Sanu & Udit Narayan --- Week 11 - 'til end! (became permanent judges until the end of the show along with Jatin Pandit)
- Shiney Ahuja & Kaveri Jha --- Week 16 (To promote their movie Hijack)
- Pandit Jasraj, Durga Jasraj, & Sharang Dev on Grand-Finale.

== Contestants ==
Family Name	Members	From	Status	Status Date	Elimination Week
Sharma Parriwar	Haneet Taneja; Arvind Gujral; Amit Sharma	Punjab	Winner	24 August 2008	WINNERS!
Ali Parriwar	Yasoob Ali; Misbah Ali; Mehboob Ali	Uttar Pradesh	Runner-up	24 August 2008	Finale
Chaturvedi Parriwar	Rishabh Chaturvedi; Meenu Chaturvedi; Anuj Chaturvedi	Punjab	Eliminated	11 August 2008	Week 16
Ali Ghani Parriwar	Amjad Ali; Ghani Mohammad; Ali Mohammad	Rajasthan	Eliminated/ Wildcard/ Eliminated	4 August 2008/ 14 July 2008/ 7 July 2008	Week 15/ Week 12/ Week 11
Rizvi Parriwar	Neha Rizvi; Runaa Rizvi; Raj Kumar Rizvi	Rajasthan	Eliminated	28 July 2008	Week 14
Ramshankar Parriwar (Shambhu Pandit Parriwar)	Pradeep Pandit; Ekta Sharma; Ram Shankar	Rajasthan	Eliminated/ Wildcard/ Eliminated	21 July 2008/ 14 July 2008/ 23 June 2008	Week 13/ Week 12/ Week 9
Khadilkar Parriwar	Tiagra Khadilkar; Amruta Natu; Radnyi Khadilkar	Maharashtra	Eliminated	30 June 2008	Week 10
Chellam Parriwar	Subhash Chellam; Lavanya Chellam; Abhilasha Chellam	Maharashtra	Eliminated	10 June 2008	Week 7
Trijayh Parriwar	Trijayh De; Abhi Dutta; Swastika Maitra	West Bengal	Eliminated	3 June 2008	Week 6
Rathore Parriwar	Mahipal Rathore; Pooja Rathore; Gopal Rathore	Rajasthan	Eliminated	20 May 2008	Week 5
Moyal Parriwar	Harish Moyal; Mahesh Moyal; Premlata Moyal	Madhya Pradesh	Eliminated	13 May 2008	Week 3
Bhagwat Parriwar	Madhav Bhagwat; Suchitra Bhagwat; Akshay Bhagwat	Maharashtra	Eliminated	6 May 2008	Week 2
