= Jungle (2000 film) =

2000 Indian film by Ram Gopal Varma

- Movie poster
- Directed by: Ram Gopal Varma
- Written by: Jaideep Sahni
- Produced by: Ram Gopal Varma
- Starring: Sunil Shetty; Fardeen Khan; Urmila Matondkar; Makrand Deshpande; Sushant Singh; Himanshu Malik
- Cinematography: Vijay Kumar Arora
- Edited by: Chandan Arora
- Music by: Sandeep Chowta
- Release date: 14 July 2000
- Running time: 153 minutes
- Country: India
- Language: Hindi
- Budget: est. ₹4.75 crore
- Box office: est. ₹14.34 crore

Jungle is a 2000 Indian Hindi-language survival thriller film produced and directed by Ram Gopal Varma. The movie is about a group of bandits, led by forest brigand, "Durga Narayan Chaudhary" (Sushant Singh), that hold a bunch of tourists hostage. It stars Suniel Shetty as Shivraj, the head of police, Urmila Matondkar as Anu Malhotra, one of the hostages, and Fardeen Khan as Siddhu, her love interest. The ensemble cast film has received positive reviews upon release and was declared a hit.

Jungle received many accolades and nominations, including the Filmfare Award for Best Background Score at the 46th Filmfare Awards. For his performance, Sushant Singh won an IIFA Award and Zee Cine Award for Best Performance in a Negative Role.

== Plot ==
Anu Malhotra and Siddharth "Siddhu" Mishra are in love with each other and would like to get married. Anu is ready to inform her parents about her future life partner, but everything is put on hold, as the family decides to go out on a group safari-like expedition. Siddhu also decides to go incognito. The group gets to view wildlife from fairly close distances.

Tragedy strikes when the group (except Siddhu) is kidnapped by the bandit Durga Narayan Choudhary and his gang. The bandits commit atrocities on the kidnapped people and finally behead one of the women in order to terrorize the government and extract ransom as well as release one of their men who is in police custody. Once their demands are met, the bandits release the remaining hostages, except Anu, whom the chief Durga Narayan Choudhary has started liking. This is unacceptable for his girlfriend Bali, the only female bandit of the gang. When Siddhu does not find Anu among the released hostages, he sends the illegal arms supplier Dorai to request Durga Narayan Choudhary for Anu's release. He secretly follows Dorai and finally reaches Anu. In the ensuing commotion, he is able to run away with her, with the bandits in their pursuit. They keep searching their way out of the dense forest.

Meanwhile, the goons started to reduce in numbers as they get shot one by one during repeated police encounters. Finally, Durga is the only one left. Still mad about Anu, he searches for her. He is about to take Anu away once more but is intercepted by Shivraj, whom he eventually murders, but finally Siddhu beats up Durga and he is arrested. He re-unites with Anu and the movie ends on a happy note.

== Cast ==
- Sunil Shetty as Shivraj Mittal, a forest ranger officer
- Fardeen Khan as Siddharth "Siddhu" Mishra
- Urmila Matondkar as Anu Malhotra
- Makrand Deshpande as Doraiswamy 'Madrasi'
- Sushant Singh as Durga Narayan Chaudhary
- Kashmera Shah as Bali
- Himanshu Malik as Pawan Birla
- Raju Kher as Mr. Shekhar Malhotra
- Swati Chitnis as Mrs. Sonia Malhotra
- Rajpal Yadav as Sippa
- Vijay Raaz as Deshu
- Ram Awana as Jinda
- Gurinder Makna as Makna
- Sanjay Kumar as Phoda
- Anil Yadav as Bhura
- Avtar Gill as Minister
- Nawazuddin Siddiqui as Khabri Jaiswal
- Manmeet Singh as Mr. Chadda

== Soundtrack ==
Jungle

Soundtrack album by Sandeep Chowta
- Released: 8 June 2000
- Genre: Feature film soundtrack
- Label: Universal Music India

The music for the film was composed by Sandeep Chowta and Sameer penned the lyrics.

#	Title	Singer(s)
1	"Jaan Kahan Hai Tu"	Kumar Sanu, Sunidhi Chauhan
2	"Aiyo Aiyo Rama"	Sonu Nigam, Sunidhi Chauhan, Sowmya Raoh, Makrand Deshpande
3	"Do Pyar Karne Wale"	Sonu Nigam, Sunidhi Chauhan
4	"Patli Kamar"	Sukhwinder Singh, Sapna Awasthi, Sandeep Chowta, Jolly Mukherjee
5	"Pehli Baar"	Sonu Nigam, Sunidhi Chauhan
6	"Sorry Baba"	Sonu Nigam, Sadhana Sargam

== Reception ==
Jungle received generally positive reviews from critics. Taran Adarsh of Bollywood Hungama gave it 3.5 out of 5 stars and wrote, "Director Ram Gopal Varma deserves a pat on his back for choosing an offbeat subject, going in for a star cast that will not make the distributors' heartbeat faster and handling the subject with utmost honesty. To state that this is his finest effort, better than Shiva, Rangeela and Satya, would be absolutely right ... Every character in Jungle has a well-defined role, which is why every performance stands out at the end of the day." Aparajita Saha of Rediff said, "Jungle is a movie where the violence is believable, the tension palpable, the emotions credible and the performances real."

== Accolades ==
Award	Date (Note: Linked to the article about the awards held that year, wherever possible.)	Category	Recipient(s) and nominee(s)	Result	Ref.
Filmfare Awards	17 February 2001	Best Background Score	Sandeep Chowta	Won	
International Indian Film Academy Awards	16 June 2001	Best Actor in a Negative Role	Sushant Singh	Won	
Screen Awards	20 January 2001	Best Director	Ram Gopal Varma	Nominated	
Screen Awards	20 January 2001	Best Actor in a Negative Role	Rajpal Yadav	Won	
Screen Awards	20 January 2001	Best Actor in a Negative Role	Kashmera Shah	Nominated	
Screen Awards	20 January 2001	Best Action	Allan Amin	Nominated	
Screen Awards	20 January 2001	Best Background Music	Sandeep Chowta	Nominated	
Screen Awards	20 January 2001	Best Editing	Chandan Arora	Nominated	
Screen Awards	20 January 2001	Best Screenplay	Jaideep Sahni	Nominated	
Screen Awards	20 January 2001	Best Sound Design	Dwarak Warrier	Nominated	
Zee Cine Awards	3 March 2001	Best Actor in a Negative Role	Sushant Singh	Won	
