= Antham =

1992 film by Ram Gopal Varma

Antham Drohi
- Theatrical release poster
- Directed by: Ram Gopal Varma
- Screenplay by: Ram Gopal Varma
- Story by: Ram Gopal Varma
- Produced by: K. Prasad; Boney Kapoor
- Dialogues by: Akash Khurana (Hindi dialogues)
- Starring: Nagarjuna; Urmila Matondkar
- Cinematography: Teja
- Edited by: Shankar
- Music by: Score: Mani Sharma; Songs: R. D. Burman; Mani Sharma (1 song); M. M. Keeravani (1 song)
- Distributed by: Drishya Creations
- Release dates: 11 September 1992 (Telugu); 30 October 1992 (Hindi)
- Running time: 130 minutes
- Country: India
- Languages: Telugu; Hindi

Antham (transl. The End) is a 1992 Indian neo-noir crime film written and directed by Ram Gopal Varma. Shot simultaneously in Telugu and Hindi languages, it stars Nagarjuna, Urmila Matondkar and Danny Denzongpa. The Telugu version was released on 11 September 1992, while the Hindi version, titled Drohi (transl. The Traitor), was released on 30 October 1992, coinciding with Diwali.

The film's soundtrack was composed by R. D. Burman, with one song each by Mani Sharma and M.M. Keeravani, while the background score was provided by Mani Sharma. The film was a box-office failure.

== Cast ==
- Nagarjuna as Raghav / Shekhar
- Urmila Matondkar as Bhavana
- Danny Denzongpa as J.P. Shetty
- Salim Ghouse as Inspector Krishna
- Akash Khurana as Mayor
- Rallapalli as Hotel Receptionist
- Gokina Rama Rao
- Narra Venkateswara Rao
- Horse Babu
- Jaliil
- Dubbing Janaki
- Silk Smitha as a special appearance in the song "Entha Sepaina"

== Soundtrack ==
Antham / Drohi

Film score by R. D. Burman Mani Sharma
- Released: 1992
- Genre: Soundtrack
- Length: 47:39
- Label: Surya Audio
- Producers: R. D. Burman; Mani Sharma

The songs were composed by R. D. Burman and the background score by Mani Sharma. The track Chalekki Undhanuko is composed by Mani Sharma and "Gundello Dhada Dhada" is composed by M. M. Keeravani.

The lyrics were written by Sirivennela Sitarama Sastry (Telugu) and Mehboob (Hindi), and the soundtrack was released by Surya Audio company.

Telugu Soundtrack

All tracks are written by Sirivennela Seetharama Sastry.

No.	Title	Music	Artist(s)	Length
1.	"O Maina"	R. D. Burman	K. S. Chithra	6:20
2.	"Nee Navvu"	R. D. Burman	S. P. Balasubrahmanyam	5:49
3.	"Chalekki Undhanuko"	Mani Sharma	K. S. Chithra, Jojo	4:50
4.	"Entha Sepaina"	R. D. Burman	K. S. Chithra	6:06
5.	"Gundello Dhada Dhada"	M. M. Keeravani	K. S. Chithra, S. P. Balasubrahmanyam	5:59
6.	"Oohalevo Regey"	R. D. Burman	Mano, Kavita Krishnamurthy	6:41
Total length:				35:53

Hindi Soundtrack

All tracks are written by Mehboob.

No.	Title	Music	Artist(s)	Length
1.	"Panchi Gaaye Re"	R. D. Burman	Asha Bhosle	6:17
2.	"Aise Hamen Dekho"	R. D. Burman	Asha Bhosle	6:43
3.	"Jungle Dance"	Mani Sharma	K. S. Chithra, Jojo	4:56
4.	"Dhadakti Mere Dil"	M. M. Keeravani	K. S. Chithra, Vinod Rathod	5:57
5.	"Tan Mein Agni"	R. D. Burman	Amit Kumar, Kavita Krishnamurthy	6:49
6.	"Tum Jo Mile"	R. D. Burman	Suresh Wadkar	5:49
7.	"Dooba Dooba"	R. D. Burman	Asha Bhosle, Jolly Mukherjee	6:28
Total length:				47:39
