= Tehzeeb (2003 film) =

2003 Indian film by Khalid Mohammed

- DVD cover
- Directed by: Khalid Mohammed
- Written by: Khalid Mohammed; Javed Siddiqui
- Produced by: Paresh Talpade
- Starring: Shabana Azmi; Urmila Matondkar; Arjun Rampal; Diya Mirza
- Cinematography: Santosh Sivan
- Edited by: A. Sreekar Prasad
- Music by: A. R. Rahman
- Distributed by: 20th Century Fox India
- Release date: 21 November 2003
- Running time: 143 min
- Country: India
- Language: Hindi

Tehzeeb (transl. 'Etiquette') is a 2003 Indian Hindi-language drama film directed by Khalid Mohammed. The film stars Shabana Azmi, Urmila Matondkar, Dia Mirza, Arjun Rampal and Rishi Kapoor in a special appearance. Urmila and Shabana were praised for their roles. It was inspired by Ingmar Bergman's Swedish drama Autumn Sonata (1978) and was dedicated to Bergman. It was released on 21 November 2003.

== Plot ==
Anwar (Rishi Kapoor) and Rukhsana (Shabana Azmi) had been married for years. After the birth of their daughters Tehzeeb and Nazneen, Anwar goes into depression and commits suicide. Rukhsana is an ambitious and popular singer. After her husband's mysterious death, her elder daughter Tehzeeb (Urmila Matondkar) suspects her to be the cause of his demise. Despite the court declaring Rukhsana innocent, Tehzeeb bears a grudge against her and accuses her of deserting her and Nazneen (Dia Mirza).

Years later, Tehzeeb has married Salim (Arjun Rampal) against her mother's wishes. Nazneen is mentally challenged, and Tehzeeb takes her under her custody. Tehzeeb lives happily with her husband and Nazneen, until Rukhsana decides to visit them and renew ties after five years. Both mother and daughter are happy about the upcoming visit, but the tension between them turns up eventually.

Many challenges and arguments arise because of Tehzeeb and Rukhsana's differences. But Tehzeeb and her mother have many good moments and Rukhsana grows close to both her daughters. Disaster then strikes when Nazneen shoots herself. Here the truth comes out that Anwar killed himself and Rukhsana wasn't responsible. Rukhsana wants to take Nazneen with her, but Tehzeeb doesn't agree. Salim convinces her and she finally gives her consent.

On the day that Rukhsana is to leave, she is sitting on the swing with her eyes closed. Tehzeeb goes up to her and apologises, tells her she still loves her, but Rukhsana doesn't reply. Tehzeeb shakes her and Rukhsana falls over. In panic, Tehzeeb calls Salim. It is revealed that Rukhsana neglected her health and had a heart attack which she died of.

At the end of the movie, Tehzeeb is singing one of her mother's songs in her memory to a crowd while Salim and Nazneen watch her.

== Cast ==
- Shabana Azmi as Rukhsana Jamal
- Urmila Matondkar as Tehzeeb Jamal Mirza
- Arjun Rampal as Salim Mirza
- Diya Mirza as Nazneen Jamal (Naazu)
- Rishi Kapoor as Anwar Jamal (special appearance)
- Namrata Shirodkar as Aloka
- Satish Kaushik as Kamal Choksi
- Rekha Rao as Suman (Maid)
- Palak Jain
- Diana Hayden as Sheena Roy

== Awards ==
Won

- Zee Cine Award Best Actor in a Supporting Role - Female – Shabana Azmi

Nominated

- Zee Cine Award Best Lyricist – Javed Akhtar
- Zee Cine Award Best Choreographer – Remo D'souza
- Star Screen Award Best Supporting Actress – Shabana Azmi
- Filmfare Best Supporting Actress Award – Shabana Azmi

== Music ==
Tehzeeb

Soundtrack album by A. R. Rahman
- Released: 13 October 2003 (India)
- Recorded: Panchathan Record Inn
- Genre: Feature film soundtrack
- Label: T-Series
- Producer: A. R. Rahman

A. R. Rahman chronology
Kangalal Kaidhu Sei (2003)	Tehzeeb (2003)	Udhaya (2003)

The soundtrack of the film contains six songs. The music is by A.R. Rahman. The lyrics were written by Javed Akhtar but the Ghazal songs had lyrics adapted from traditional poems of famous poets. Rahman introduced a singer Sujata Bhattacharya, who later renamed herself as Madhushree. An additional song "Habibi" was featured in the movie but was not released in cassettes or CDs.

Song	Singer(s)	Lyrics
"Khoye Khoye Aankhen"	Shaan	Shahd Azimabadi (Adaptation)
"Meherbaan"	Asha Bhosle, Sukhwinder Singh	Javed Akhtar
"Na Shiqwa Hota"	Madhushree	Javed Akhtar
"Sabaq Aisa"	Madhushree	Dagh Dehlvi (Adaptation)
"Mujhpe Toofan Uthaye"	Madhushree	Momin Khan Momin (Adaptation)
"I Wanna Be Free"	Annupamaa, Mathangi	Blaaze
"Na Shiqwa Hota"	Vijaya, Madhushree	Javed Akhtar
"Habibi" (additional song)	Sunitha Sarathy	Javed Akhtar
