= Ek Hasina Thi (film) =

- Poster
- Directed by: Sriram Raghavan
- Written by: Sriram Raghavan; Pooja Ladha Surti
- Produced by: Ram Gopal Varma; R. R. Venkat
- Starring: Urmila Matondkar; Saif Ali Khan; Aditya Srivastava; Seema Biswas
- Cinematography: C. K. Muraleedharan
- Edited by: Sanjib Datta
- Music by: Amar Mohile
- Production companies: K Sera Sera Productions; R. R. Movie Makers
- Distributed by: 20th Century Fox
- Release date: 16 January 2004
- Running time: 139 minutes
- Country: India
- Language: Hindi
- Budget: ₹4 crore
- Box office: ₹10 crore

Ek Hasina Thi (English: There Was A Beautiful Woman) is a 2004 Indian Hindi-language neo-noir action thriller film directed by Sriram Raghavan in his directorial debut and produced by Ram Gopal Varma. It stars Urmila Matondkar and Saif Ali Khan in the lead roles.

The film borrows elements from the Sidney Sheldon novel If Tomorrow Comes. Critic Ronjita Kulkarni said it's "loosely based" on Double Jeopardy, while "the film also adapts a scene from The Bone Collector." The film premiered at the New York Asian Film Festival and was released in India on 16 January 2004. Although a commercial failure upon its release, the film is considered one of the best works of Matondkar, Khan and Raghavan.

== Plot ==
Sarika is a single woman who lives alone in Mumbai and works at a travel agency. She meets Karan and initially resists his romantic advances, but the two eventually sleep together and begin a relationship. One day, Karan asks Sarika to host one of his friends for 2 hours as he is new to the city, and she agrees. Karan's friend arrives at Sarika's home. When he receives a phone call he asks if he can leave his suitcase there to be picked up later before his flight, Sarika agrees and he leaves. That evening, Sarika sees on the news that the man is a wanted criminal. Sarika is shocked and calls Karan, who tells her to get rid of the suitcase. Sarika steps out with the suitcase and is intercepted by police officers who arrest her. Karan asks her to speak to his lawyer, Kamlesh Mathur, and not to mention his name anywhere in this investigation as that could damage his reputation in his business. After losing the initial hearing and being denied bail, the attorney advises her to confess to the crime, convincing her that since she has no criminal record and no prior convictions, the judge will release her.

Sarika complies after being convinced that the judge will give her a light sentence after the attorney tells her this is the Judge's idea since he is working alongside Karan. However, the judge sentences her to seven years in prison without parole. Sarika then realises that Karan and his attorney have cheated her. Karan is a criminal who framed her to keep the police away from him. Soon after this realisation, Sarika's father dies. In prison, Sarika's hatred for Karan grows. Pramila, an inmate who has contacts outside prison, decides to help Sarika.

Sarika begins a journey of self-transformation, which she starts by conquering her fear of rats. She beats up an abusive inmate, Gomati, who had bullied her. Sarika then escapes from prison, along with a few other inmates after starting a fire in the kitchen. Karan is notified of her escape by Kamlesh Mathur but does not think much of it. ACP Malti Vaidya sets out to find Sarika. Sarika finds Mathur and kills him after learning Karan's whereabouts, working for a gangster in Delhi.

Sarika finds Karan in Delhi with his new girlfriend. She takes a room right opposite Karan's so that she can observe him. She trails him day and night, without arousing suspicion. ACP Malti Vaidya finds Sarika when Sarika calls her mother from a prepaid phone in Delhi. Karan, in the meantime, is in trouble with a local gangster, Sanjeev, to whom he owes money. He is kidnapped from a nightclub by Sanjeev's henchmen, who threaten him. Karan is taken to Bilal, Sanjeev's partner who alerts him Sanjeev is ready to meet him, Sarika secretly observes the incident and as soon as Karan leaves the room, Sanjeev is found dead, and suspicion falls on Karan.

Karan and his girlfriend are attacked in the hotel, leaving his girlfriend and a few henchmen dead. Karan escapes as ACP Malti reaches his hotel suite in pursuit of Sarika. Karan is bewildered at Sanjeev's death and the attack and wonders if a rival gang murdered Sanjeev.

Meanwhile, Sarika pretends to meet Karan accidentally. She pretends to have sympathy for him, and Karan believes her. Karan confronts a man whom he suspects to be a traitor, but before the man can say anything; Karan kills him.

Sarika is amused at Karan's confusion. She steals money from Karan's boss, for which Karan is suspected. Realizing she has framed him after ACP Malti's questioning, Karan confronts and assaults Sarika, who tells him she has burned the money. Karan takes Sarika to his boss and makes her confess at gunpoint. But she feigns ignorance and claims that Karan forced her to confess. A fight begins between Karan and his boss's henchman as the ACP enters with the police.

In a shootout, the ACP kills Karan's boss, and the ACP herself is shot. Karan briefly escapes before Sarika catches him, holds him at gunpoint, and makes him drive to a secluded spot. After knocking Karan unconscious, Sarika chains him in a cavern infested with rats. As Karan regains consciousness, Sarika tells him how she used to be scared of rats, and she chose this spot because she wanted him to go through the pain and suffering that she went through while she was in prison. Sarika leaves Karan in the cavern.

Karan screams, but no one hears him. A pack of rats slowly start crawling all over him and eventually kill him. Sarika surrenders to the ACP, turning in the bag of money that she stole from Karan's boss to the ACP.

== Cast ==
- Urmila Matondkar as Sarika Vartak
- Saif Ali Khan as Karan Singh Rathod
- Seema Biswas as ACP Malti Vaidya
- Aditya Srivastava as Advocate Kamlesh Mathur
- Pratima Kazmi as Prisoner Pramila
- Kavita Kaushik as Karan's girlfriend in Delhi
- Zakir Hussain as Sanjiv Nanda
- Seema Adhikari as Dolly
- Rajendra Sethi as Sarika's neighbour
- Gopal K Singh as Abhijeet
- Madan Joshi as Bilal
- Murali Sharma as Lawyer
- Ravi Kale as S.I.(sub Inspector)
- Abhay Bhargav as Nanda, Karan's boss
- Rasika Joshi as Prisoner Gomati
- Sheeba Chaddha as Anita

== Production ==
Saif Ali Khan was initially unsure about accepting the role of Karan as he was unaccustomed to portraying such a ruthless character, though the filmmakers convinced him to accept the role. For his first role as a villain, he received a lot of appreciation for his performance.

== Soundtrack ==
The film's soundtrack and background score were composed by Amar Mohile. The first song 'Neend Na Aaye' that plays at the beginning of the film has been sung by Pandit Jasraj. The title song 'Ek Hasina Thi' plays in the second half of the film.

== Reception ==
Taran Adarsh of IndiaFM gave the film a 3 out of 5, writing, "On the whole, EK HASINA THI, in the spirit of RGV's other movies, has some fresh things to say about love, passion, deceit and destiny". K. Kavitha of Deccan Herald wrote that "His [Ram Gopal Varma's] ‘K Sera Sera Productions’ conjures up yet another superbly crafted movie; yet another promising director — Sriram Raghavan and yet another virtuoso performance by his muse, Urmila".

Urmila Matondkar received high praise for her role as a merciless avenger. Ek Hasina Thi is considered one of the finest performances in her career.
