= Karzzzz =

2008 Indian film by Satish Kaushik

Karz
- Directed by: Satish Kaushik
- Written by: Shiraz Ahmed
- Based on: Karz by Subhash Ghai
- Produced by: Bhushan Kumar
- Starring: Urmila Matondkar; Himesh Reshammiya; Shweta Kumar; Dino Morea; Gulshan Grover; Danny Denzongpa; Rohini Hattangadi
- Cinematography: Manoj Soni
- Edited by: Hemal Kothari
- Music by: Songs: Himesh Reshammiya; Score: Ranjit Barot
- Production company: T-Series Films
- Distributed by: BIG Pictures
- Release date: 17 October 2008
- Running time: 144 minutes
- Country: India
- Language: Hindi
- Budget: ₹24 crore
- Box office: ₹16 crore

Karzzzz (transl. Debt) is a 2008 Indian Hindi-language romance fantasy action film directed by Satish Kaushik. It stars Urmila Matondkar and Himesh Reshammiya. It is a remake of Karz (1980) and also inspired by The Reincarnation of Peter Proud.

== Plot ==
Ravi Verma has just won a court case against gangster Sir Judah in Kenya, making him the legal recipient of several thousand acres of vineyards. He celebrates the victory by marrying the love of his life, Kamini, and decides to introduce her to his mother and sister. Unbeknownst to Ravi, Kamini is in cahoots with Judah; she sabotages the plane they are travelling in and safely escapes, leaving Ravi with no parachute. He quickly falls to his death. Kamini, now Princess Kamini, inherits Ravi's wealth, forcing his mother and sister to live in abject poverty.

Flash forward to 25 years later, and we are introduced to Monty, the adopted son of J.J. Oberoi and a well-known musician and rock star in Cape Town, South Africa. He has everything at his disposal but feels unhappy. He derives joy from spending time with Tina, the girl he's romantically interested in, and Dr. Dayal, his friend and close confidante. Monty starts getting flashbacks of events from Ravi's life and plans to trip to Kenya to understand why. Once there, he meets Tina's caretaker, Kabira, who appears to be happy about Tina and Monty being together.

Eventually, Monty realises that he is actually the reincarnation of Ravi. After complete recollection of events surrounding his accident, Monty sets out to find his/Ravi's mother and sister. He befriends Princess Kamini, who incidentally knows Tina as well. She's now Judah's mistress and the heiress to Ravi's property. Monty tells her about the reincarnation but insists he doesn't remember how he/Ravi died. She proceeds to mislead him about the circumstances of the accident and lies that his/Ravi's mother and sister are deceased. Later, Monty discovers that they have been living with his/Ravi's nephew and niece this entire time. He hatches a plan with Tina and Kabira to bring Princess Kamini to justice.

Monty convinces Princess Kamini to marry him. He furnishes the actual papers for Ravi's properties in an attempt to persuade her, and it works. They get married on stage at Monty's show. During the performance, he reenacts the accident to make Princess Kamini believe that he remembers she killed him/Ravi. Following a showdown between Monty and her, she confesses, albeit in anger, to Ravi's murder.

Monty brings in his/Ravi's mother and sister (accompanied by her kids) and warns Princess Kamini that they will get their dues. In the meantime, Kabira appears with the police in tow, who have her confession on record. Suddenly, Judah comes along holding Tina hostage and demands Princess Kamini's release. A fight ensues, with Kabira tackling Judah and rescuing Tina. Princess Kamini tries to run away, with Monty at her heels. They arrive at the same spot where Ravi was killed in his previous birth, as she boards a plane and shoots Monty. During the hullabaloo, Monty's car overturns with fuel leakage. As Princess Kamini's plane approaches him, Monty sets the car on fire that soon engulfs the plane. With Princess Kamini dead, Monty and Tina are united as the end credits roll.

== Cast ==
- Himesh Reshammiya as Monty Oberoi; Reincarnation of Ravi Shanta Prasad Verma
- Urmila Matondkar as Kamini Verma, Ravi Verma's wife
- Dino Morea as Ravi Shanta Prasad Verma (Shanta's son, Jyoti's brother and Kamini Devi's husband) (special appearance)
- Danny Denzongpa as Kabira (Kabir Uncle / "Kabir Chacha")
- Raj Babbar as G.G. Oberoi, Neha's husband (Monty's Guardian; Music Producer)
- Imran Hasnee as Mahesh Khandelwal; Tina's dad
- Smita Bansal as Jyoti Shanta Parasad Verma 'aka' Pinky, Shanta's daughter and Ravi's sister
- Shweta Kumar as Tina Khandelwal, Monty's love-interest
- Shiva Rindani as Sir Judah's man
- Rohini Hattangadi as Mrs. Shanta Prasad Verma, Ravi and Jyoti's mother
- Gulshan Grover as Sir Judah, A Left-Handed Robot-boss of Kamini Devi
- Bakhtiyaar Irani as Dr. Dayal, Monty's friend
- Himani Shivpuri as Mrs. Neha Oberoi, G. G. Oberoi's wife
- Tareena Patel as Julie, Monty's fan (special appearance)
- David Hallart as dancer, background actor
- Asrani as Mr. Joe D'Souza, Principal of Verma Catering College
- Sudhir Dalvi as Dr. Shastri, Dr. Dayal's Senior
- Sudhir Pandey as John
- Dinesh Lamba as Kabira's sidekick
- Jenny Freeman as White Extra
- Daniel Green as Obsessed Fan
- Sujeet Kumar Sharma

== Production ==
The film was flagged on 25 January 2008. Filming took place in Mumbai, India and in South Africa. Reshammiya performed his own stunts. On 16 February 2008, Reshammiya had given a live performance in South Africa of the two ultimate dance numbers namely "Sisak Sisak Ke" and "Hari Om". The sound recording was entirely done in Singapore. Reshammiya performed his songs "Lut Jaaon" and "Ek Haseena Thi" at Sa Re Ga Ma Pa Challenge 2009's first show.

== Reception ==
Taran Adarsh of Bollywood Hungama gave Karzzzz 4 stars out of 5 claiming it to be a "Mass entertainer" and further saying that "Karzzzz is rich in entertainment. Himesh's tremendous popularity amongst masses, its chartbusting musical score and the fact that it's a remake of a much-loved film will only lure masses in hordes. Besides, it's an open ground for Karzzzz at the ticket window, what with the euphoria of all past releases having dried up. At the box-office, the film should fetch a thunderous start and in due course, should be amongst the biggest achievers of the year in terms of business, Critics praised Urmila's performance in the film." Rajeev Masand of CNN-IBN gave the film one star and said "It's a lazy rip-off where everything from characters to dialogues has been more-or-less duplicated, the only changes being superficial ones which grate rather than update." IndiaTimes gave 3 out of 5 stars and labelled it as a 'paisa vasool' film.

== Soundtrack ==
Himesh Reshammiya composed the film's music while Sameer penned the lyrics. The song "Ek Haseena Thi" is taken from the original movie of 1980, Karz, whose music was by Laxmikant Pyarelal. According to the Indian trade website Box Office India, with around 1,300,000 units sold, this film's soundtrack album was the year's eleventh highest-selling. All tracks one through nine were remixed and mixed by DJ Akbar Sami.

Karzzzz

Soundtrack album by Himesh Reshammiya
- Released: August 27, 2008
- Recorded: 2008
- Venue: Mumbai
- Genre: Film soundtrack
- Length: 50:45
- Label: T-Series
- Producer: Himesh Reshammiya

Himesh Reshammiya chronology
Dasavathaaram (2008)	Karzzzz (2008)	Radio (2009)

All lyrics are written by Sameer.

Track-List
No.	Title	Singers	Length
1.	"Dhoom Tere Ishq Ki"	Himesh Reshammiya	5.39
2.	"Ek Haseena Thi (Originally composed by Laxmikant–Pyarelal)"	Himesh Reshammiya, Shreya Ghoshal	7:57
3.	"Hari Om Hari Om"	Himesh Reshammiya	5:08
4.	"Lut Jaaon Lut Jaaon" (Title Track)	Himesh Reshammiya, Harshdeep Kaur	5:36
5.	"Masha Allah"	Himesh Reshammiya	5:29
6.	"Sisak Sisak"	Himesh Reshammiya	5:02
7.	"Soniye Je Tere"	Himesh Reshammiya, Tulsi Kumar	4:51
8.	"Tandoori Nights"	Himesh Reshammiya, Sunidhi Chauhan	5:15
9.	"Tere Bin Chain Na Aave"	Himesh Reshammiya, Tulsi Kumar	5:48
Total length:			50:45

== Awards and nominations ==
Year	Award	Category	Nominee	Result
2009	Stardust Awards	Best Actor / Actress In Negative Role	Urmila Matondkar	Nominated
