= Judaai (1997 film) =

- Poster
- Directed by: Raj Kanwar
- Written by: Prakash Raj; S.V. Krishna Reddy; Jainendra Jain
- Based on: Subhalagnam by S. V. Krishna Reddy
- Produced by: Surinder Kapoor; Boney Kapoor
- Starring: Anil Kapoor; Sridevi; Urmila Matondkar; Paresh Rawal
- Narrated by: Amitabh Bachchan
- Cinematography: Harmeet Singh
- Edited by: Waman Bhonsle
- Music by: Nadeem-Shravan
- Distributed by: S.K. Film Enterprises; Eros Entertainment
- Release date: 28 February 1997
- Running time: 160 minutes
- Country: India
- Language: Hindi
- Budget: ₹6.30 crore
- Box office: ₹28 crore

Judaai (transl. Separation) is a 1997 Indian Hindi-language romantic drama film directed by Raj Kanwar and produced by Surinder Kapoor and Boney Kapoor. It stars Anil Kapoor, Sridevi and Urmila Matondkar. Kader Khan, Farida Jalal, Johnny Lever, Paresh Rawal, Upasana Singh and Saeed Jaffrey feature in supporting roles. Poonam Dhillon makes a special appearance. It is a remake of the 1994 Telugu flm Subhalagnam. The plot revolves around the travails of a greedy wife, Kajal (Sridevi), who, lured by wealth, convinces her husband (Kapoor) to marry a second time.

Some portions of the film were filmed in Thun, Switzerland. Upon release, the film was a major commercial success, grossing ₹28 crore against its ₹6.30 crore budget, becoming the seventh highest grossing Indian film of 1997. The film was widely praised for the performances of the lead actresses.

== Plot ==
Kajal marries engineer Raj Verma. She assumes that he is wealthy and corrupt. But in reality, Raj is neither wealthy nor corrupt and this annoys Kajal.

She and Raj have twin children: Romi and Preeti. But still, Kajal's mind hasn't changed. She meets her old wealthy friend Nisha, lying that Raj is a business magnate, her family owns several cars, and has a big bungalow. Nisha offers to give her a lift and Kajal is exposed when the bungalow she points out as her own turns out to be Nisha's.

Coming from overseas, Raj's boss, Randhir's niece Jahnvi learns he is an engineer working for Randhir's construction company. Vikram Khanna, Randhir's business partner, tries to rape Jahnvi, but Raj arrives and saves her. She falls in love with him.

Even when she learns that he is a married man, she is adamant about marrying him. Unaware that Kajal is Raj's wife, Jahnvi, accidentally meets her. She confesses her love to Kajal and Raj, which angers them.

Jahnvi meets Kajal and offers 2 crore rupees in exchange for marrying Raj. Kajal, seeing this as her chance to gain wealth, accepts the proposal. Kajal forces Raj into the agreement. Reluctantly, Raj marries Jahnvi. Kajal divorces him herself, to comply with the Hindu Marriage Act; thinking that she and Jahnvi will happily share Raj.

Kajal uses the money she got in the bargain to buy a huge mansion and cars. The bungalow she buys ends up being that of Nisha. She briefly returns to her old home to collect a picture of her husband. Kajal taunts her that she has fulfilled her dreams, whereas Nisha has lost everything. Nisha reminds Kajal that she sold her house and possessions to pay for the treatment of her ill husband, whereas Kajal has sold her husband for riches. Kajal moulds herself into a socialite. This leads to Kajal neglecting her family. Raj initially feels rejected by Kajal and does not get close to Jahnvi, feeling objectified for being bought and sold between his two wives. But the children and Raj find companionship with Jahnvi, who showers them with love and affection. She changes herself and becomes a housewife. She even travels happily in crowded buses and autos to make Raj and the kids feel secure and happy around her. She abandons all the luxury and comforts she grew up with. The children call Jahnvi "Maa", something that Kajal would previously reprimand her children for calling her, insisting that they call her "Mummy" as it sounded high society.

Kajal eventually realizes how she has drifted from her family. She forgets her wedding anniversary and throws a birthday party for her daughter's birthday, not realizing that Raj has never been attracted to a lavish lifestyle, and further pushes him away from her and towards Jahnvi. After frequent reminders from her mother, Kajal tries to make amends. When nothing works, an angry Kajal slaps Jahnvi and accuses her of stealing her husband, and tries to make Jahnvi leave. Kajal offers Jahnvi all her money back in exchange for Raj again, only to be told by Raj that she is the poorest, despite having all the riches she ever dreamed of. Kajal seeks legal advice, which also states that the only way she can legally marry Raj is if he and Jahnvi divorce. She then forcibly tries to throw Jahnvi out of the house, but to no avail, as Raj decides to leave with Jahnvi. The kids decide to stay with Janhvi and their father.

Kajal, on the other hand, distraught by her family abandoning her, donates all her riches. When she learns that Raj and the kids are leaving for the US, she runs to the airport for one final visit. She finds them ready to depart. But at the last minute, Jahnvi turns to Raj and tells them that she is leaving for the US alone, but she is not alone. She is expecting Raj's child. Jahnvi accepts that although Kajal sold her husband, it was she who offered to buy him, and thus she too should pay her dues. Kajal gets her family back, learning of the importance of family over money, and Jahnvi leaves for New York.

== Cast ==
- Anil Kapoor as Raj Verma
- Sridevi as Kajal Jain Verma : Raj’s wife
- Urmila Matondkar as Janhvi Sahni Verma : Raj’s second wife
- Saeed Jaffrey as Randhir Sahni : Janhvi’s uncle
- Paresh Rawal as Hasmukhlal Singh Bhagat
- Farida Jalal as Karuna Jain : Kajal’s mother
- Omkar Kapoor as Romesh "Romi" Verma : Raj & Kajal’s son
- Kader Khan as Rakshwant Jain : Kajal’s father
- Johnny Lever as Harish "Harry" Jain : Kajal’s brother
- Upasana Singh as Seema Bhagat / Vaani Bhagat Jain
- Dharmesh Tiwari as Kajal's lawyer

=== Special appearance ===
- Anil Saxena as Vikram Khanna
- Poonam Dhillon as Nisha Khadoria: Kajal's friend
- Dinesh Hingoo as Dr. Manoj Chopra
- Mehmood Jr. as Champak Raina

== Soundtrack ==
The album was composed by the duo Nadeem-Shravan and lyrics were penned by Sameer. The whole album attained tremendous popularity. The film's soundtrack album sold two million units, making it one of the year's top ten best-selling Bollywood soundtrack albums.

The film's biggest hit song was "Judaai Judaai", also known as "Mujhe Ek Pal Chain Na Aaye". It was copied from "Sanu Ek Pal Chain Na Aave" by Pakistani Qawwali singer Nusrat Fateh Ali Khan. "Meri Zindagi Ek Pyaas" is a copy of "Meri Zindagi Tera Pyar" - an iconic collaboration of Noor Jehan and Nusrat Fateh Ali Khan, penned by Khwaja Parvez.

The song "Pyaar Pyaar Karte Karte" features a sample from the Scatman John track "Scatman (Ski-Ba-Bop-Ba-Dop-Bop)".

=== Track listings ===
#	Song	Singer(s)
1.	"Mujhe Pyar Hua Allahmiya"	Alka Yagnik & Abhijeet
2.	"Main Tujhse Aise Milun"	Alka Yagnik & Abhijeet
3.	"Ooee Baba"	Alka Yagnik, Abhijeet & Sapna Mukherjee
4.	"Mujhe Ek Pal Chain Na Aaye"	Hariharan, Alka Yagnik & Jaspinder Narula
5.	"Raat Ko Neend Aati Nahin"	Amit Kumar & Priya Bhattacharya
6.	"Meri Zindagi Ek Pyaas"	Jaspinder Narula & Shankar Mahadevan
7.	"Shaadi Karke Fas Gaya"	Bali Bramhabhatt, Alka Yagnik & Shankar Mahadevan
8.	"Judaai Judaai" (Sad)	Hariharan, Alka Yagnik & Jaspinder Narula

== Reception ==
A critic from New Straits Times wrote that the film was "delightful" because of "its elements of comedy and drama, as a well as a good moral lesson to boot".

== Awards ==
Ceremony	Category	Recipient	Result
43rd Filmfare Awards	Best Scene of the Year	Judaai	Won
43rd Filmfare Awards	Best Actress	Sridevi	Nominated
43rd Filmfare Awards	Best Supporting Actress	Urmila Matondkar	Nominated
43rd Filmfare Awards	Best Comedian	Johnny Lever	Nominated
Screen Awards	Best Actress	Sridevi	Nominated
Screen Awards	Best Supporting Actress	Urmila Matondkar	Nominated
Zee Cine Awards	Best Actress	Sridevi	Nominated
Zee Cine Awards	Best Supporting Actress	Urmila Matondkar	Nominated

== See also ==
- Raanee, 2014 Maldivian remake
