= Pyaar Tune Kya Kiya (film) =

2001 Indian film by Rajat Mukherjee

- Poster
- Directed by: Rajat Mukherjee
- Written by: Rajat Mukherjee
- Produced by: Ram Gopal Varma
- Starring: Urmila Matondkar; Fardeen Khan; Sonali Kulkarni
- Cinematography: Sanjay Kapoor
- Edited by: Chandan Arora
- Music by: Sandeep Chowta
- Production company: Varma Corporation
- Distributed by: Eros Entertainment
- Release date: 27 April 2001
- Running time: 120 minutes
- Country: India
- Language: Hindi
- Budget: ₹5.5 crore
- Box office: ₹11.79 crore

Pyaar Tune Kya Kiya (transl. Love...What Have You Done?) is a 2001 Indian Hindi-language romantic thriller film produced by Ram Gopal Varma, and directed by Rajat Mukherjee. It stars Fardeen Khan, Urmila Matondkar and Sonali Kulkarni. The soundtrack was composed by Sandeep Chowta. The film, which marked Mukherjee's directorial debut, is mainly known for its soundtrack and Matondkar's remarkable performance as an obsessed lover. It is a remake of the American film Fatal Attraction.

== Plot ==
Ria Jaiswal (Urmila Matondkar) is a headstrong loner and angry woman and the only daughter of a rich businessman in Mumbai, Mr. Jaiswal (Suresh Oberoi). Jaiswal loves his daughter but is concerned about her possessive nature. One day Ria sets out for a vacation in Goa. Jai Bhatt (Fardeen Khan) is a fashion photographer, happily married to Geeta Bhatt (Sonali Kulkarni). He meets Ria and takes photos of her without permission and publishes them in the magazine he works for. The magazine becomes a hit because of the pictures. The chief editor wants Ria to model for their magazine, but she refuses because she is angry at Jai for publishing her pictures without asking her. Jai manages to convince her to model, and she falls in love with him. She wants to talk to Jai about marriage, but when she visits his home, she is shocked to meet Geeta. Shaken and distraught, Ria slips into depression.

Ria confesses her feelings to Jai, who is startled. Seeing her weeping so much, he tells her that he would have accepted her love if not married. Jai tells Geeta everything and vows to stay away from Ria. However, Ria starts to get possessive about Jai, unable to forget him. She attempts suicide and calls him in the middle of the night. Jai has no choice but to save and console her. This troubles Geeta, and she tells Jai to file a police complaint. Jai and Geeta mend their relationship and go out on a date, but that same night, Ria breaks down, and Jai consoles her again. This angers Geeta even more.

Jai attends a company party with Geeta, not knowing that Ria has also been invited. Ria now wants Jai at any cost and flirts with him in front of Geeta, who leaves fuming. At home, Jai and Geeta have a huge argument and Geeta leaves angrily. Later, she realizes her mistake and decides to return, but Ria breaks in and starts getting intimate with Jai. Geeta enters the house and loses control upon seeing them together. She accidentally falls onto a glass table and hurts her head. Jai takes her to the hospital.

Ria tells Geeta that she should leave the marriage and let her and Jai live happily. Geeta explains that Jai does not love Ria as she so thinks, and nothing can break their relationship. Jai decides to leave the city because of Ria's obsessive nature. Ria calls Jai, asking him to meet one last time. He agrees but instead goes to meet Mr. Jaiswal and tries to tell him the truth. Jai calls Geeta and hears her being attacked by someone.

It's Ria, who has become completely unstable. She attempts to kill Geeta so that she can win Jai's love. Geeta tries to escape but fails. Just as Ria is about to kill her, Jai arrives. He pleads with her to let Geeta go, and he will leave Geeta to be with her. Ria, convinced, runs toward Jai, but he slaps her hard, making her unconscious. Mr. Jaiswal arrives, and Jai tells him what Ria did.

Six months later, Geeta and Jai are happy with their lives again while Ria is housed at a mental hospital. Her father arrives at Jai's house, asking him to meet her one last time as it's her birthday and it's only Jai that can make any impact on her, to which he agrees. Upon seeing Jai, Ria loses control and shakes him until her father and the hospital crew pull her away. Jai is left feeling guilty about Ria's mental condition.

== Cast ==
- Urmila Matondkar as Ria Jaiswal
- Fardeen Khan as Jai Bhatt, Geeta's husband.
- Sonali Kulkarni as Geeta Bhatt, Jai's wife.
- Suresh Oberoi as Mr. Jaiswal, Ria's father.
- Achint Kaur as Ria's mother
- Rajpal Yadav as Rampal Yadav / Chhota Vakeel
- Ravi Baswani as Vispy
- Gautami Kapoor Mrs. Jaiswal

== Soundtrack ==
The music and background score was composed by Sandeep Chowta.

Pyaar Tune Kya Kiya

Soundtrack album by Sandeep Chowta
- Released: 24 February 2001
- Language: Hindi
- Label: Venus Records & Tapes

All lyrics are written by Nitin Raikwar.

No.	Title	Singers	Length
1.	"Kambakth Ishq"	Sonu Nigam, Sukhwinder Singh, Asha Bhosle
2.	"Pyar Tune Kya Kiya"	Sonu Nigam, Alka Yagnik
3.	"Ku Ku Ku"	Sonu Nigam
4.	"Roundhe I"	Alisha Chinai
5.	"Pyar Tune Kya Kiya"	K. S. Chitra
6.	"Mujh Ko Khuda Ne De Diya"	Kavita Subramaniam, Sonu Nigam
7.	"Kambakth Mix"	Sonu Nigam, Sukhwinder Singh, Asha Bhosle
8.	"Roundhe II"	Sowmya Raoh

== Reception ==
Taran Adarsh of IndiaFM gave the film 3 out of 5, writing, "On the whole, PYAAR TUNE KYA KIYA is a well-made film, which is targeted at the metros. The 'Kambakht Ishq' song and Urmila's bravura performance are two aces of this flick. The hype surrounding the film and the hit musical score will help the film take a great start and businesswise, this love story will have a pleasant ending at the box-office. If you are craving for something different, this film is for you. Go for it! Screen gave it a positive review, calling it "Sleek and spine-chilling." Nidhi Taparia of Rediff.com wrote, "Well publicised and slickly promoted, Pyaar Tune Kya Kiya might appeal more to the metros than anywhere else."

== See also ==
- Dheevaanaa, a 2001 Maldivian remake
