= Pyaar Ishq Aur Mohabbat =

2001 Indian film by Rajiv Rai

- Poster
- Directed by: Rajiv Rai
- Screenplay by: Rajiv Rai; Shabbir Boxwala
- Produced by: Gulshan Rai
- Starring: Sunil Shetty; Aftab Shivdasani; Arjun Rampal; Keerti Reddy
- Cinematography: P. S. Vinod
- Edited by: Rajiv Rai
- Music by: Viju Shah
- Distributed by: Trimurti Films
- Release date: 3 August 2001
- Running time: 168 minutes
- Country: India
- Language: Hindi
- Budget: ₹12 crore
- Box office: ₹7.15 crore

Pyaar Ishq Aur Mohabbat (English: Love, Amour and Romance) is a 2001 Indian Hindi-language romance film written and directed by Rajiv Rai and produced by Gulshan Rai under the Trimurti Films banner. The film stars Arjun Rampal alongside Suniel Shetty, Aftab Shivdasani and Keerthi Reddy in the lead roles.

The film was released on 3 August 2001, and was a disaster at the box office.

== Plot ==
Yash Sabharwal (Sunil Shetty) is an enterprising billionaire who excels in business strategy. He is smitten by the brilliant and lovely Isha Nair (Keerti Reddy). She is a smart medical student and her idealism leads her to Scotland for advance research. Yash sends her away by giving her a scholarship. Before she leaves, Yash hires Gaurav Saxena (Arjun Rampal) to go to Scotland with her and, using his magic, make Isha fall in love with Yash.

In Scotland, Taj Bharadwaj (Aftab Shivdasani), an endearing and loveable guy, falls madly for Isha. Born and brought up in a royal luxury, Taj is a perfect NRI gentleman. He has only one problem — whether his father Lord Bharadwaj (Dalip Tahil) would agree with him or not. When Gaurav comes into the life of Isha, Isha also falls in love with him and Gaurav falls in love with her. When Yash finds out about this, he tells Gaurav to go and break Isha's heart, so she would come back to him. Gaurav uses Maya Dhillon (Monica Bedi) by starting a fake affair with her and sleeps with her. Taj discovers it and informs Isha. When Isha sees Gaurav and Maya together, she starts hating him. Gaurav is awarded with £1 billion by Yash for getting out of Isha's life and opening the ways for him.

Gaurav opens a bank account but is unaware that the bank is owned by the Bharadwaj family and Taj runs it. Taj is shocked when he learns that a humble guy like Gaurav is opening an account of £1 billion. Taj asks Gaurav about it. Gaurav informs him that he has sold his soul to the devil. Gaurav starts to realise that he cannot live without Isha as he was really in love with her. He returns the money to Yash, informs Maya that he never loved her, and it was just a part of his plan. He informs Maya that he is going back to India and that he is in love with Isha. Maya meets Isha and tells her that Gaurav seriously loved her but sacrificed his love for Yash. Isha forgives Gaurav and still loves him.

However, Isha's parents have fixed her engagement with Taj and Isha has to agree to make her parents happy. Isha's friend Rubaina Alam (Isha Koppikar) invites Yash to the engagement. Yash refuses to attend. Rubaina insults him, tells him that he is responsible for the trouble, and he must attend. Yash decides to break Taj and Isha's engagement. On the other hand, Gaurav appears at Isha's engagement in the room where Isha is preparing. Gaurav informs her that he has always loved her but it is the end and she has to forget about him and think about Taj. Gaurav tells her that she must not tell anyone about their love and continue her life.

Taj Bharadwaj sees Gaurav and asks him about why has he come. Gaurav tries to escape with his and Isha's pictures but Taj stops him. The situation becomes worse and the pictures fall on the floor. Taj Bharadwaj sees the pictures and tries to shoot Gaurav but Yash appears and saves Gaurav. He tells everyone that he deserves to be killed and not Gaurav because he has used Gaurav and Isha and has broken their love. Isha's parents ask her who she really loves. Gaurav tells her to focus on what he has said. Isha starts crying and tells everyone that she is engaging with Taj with her own will and is not being forced by anyone. However, her mood tells that she is not saying this intentionally. Taj Bharadwaj tells Isha's parents not to force her and ask her about her real choice. Isha tells her parents that she loves Gaurav. Isha and Gaurav's engagement is fixed.

As a result, Gaurav is the one who succeeds in his true love. Yash and Taj fail, but Gaurav fixes Taj's engagement with Maya and Yash's mother fixes his engagement with Rubaina. Therefore, all three pairs start living happily. Gaurav's love for Isha wins in the end.

== Cast ==
- Suniel Shetty as Yash Sabharwal
- Arjun Rampal as Gaurav Saxena
- Aftab Shivdasani as Tajinder "Taj" Bhardwaj
- Keerthi Reddy as Isha Nair
- Isha Koppikar as Rubaina Alam
- Monica Bedi as Maya Dhillon
- Raza Murad as Dr. Alam
- Dalip Tahil as Lord Inder Bhardwaj
- Smita Jaykar as Ms. Sabbarwal
- Harish Patel as Hassu Bhai
- Anjan Srivastav as Pramod Mehra
- Denzil Smith as Mahesh Nair

== Production ==
=== Casting ===
Akshay Kumar and Bobby Deol were the original choices for the roles of Taj Bhardwaj and Gaurav Saxena respectively. Once Akshay Kumar left the film the role of Taj was originally offered to Arjun Rampal. Arjun Rampal grabbed the role of Gaurav Saxena when Bobby Deol exited the fim. Kajol and then Urmila Matondkar were Rajiv Rai's initial choices to play the lead role of Isha Nair but eventually Kirti Reddy was roped in.

=== Filming ===
Filming began on June 23, 2000. After a two-month schedule, the shooting was completed in August. The film was extensively shot in Scotland and Switzerland for a 90-day schedule.

== Release ==
=== Critical reception ===
Taran Adarsh of indiaFM gave 1 out of 5 stars, quoting "Pyaar Ishq Aur Mohabbat is too weak a film to leave any impression whatsoever." Sukanya Verma of Rediff.com wrote "Rajiv Rai, a personal favourite, who carried off fancy action-thrillers like Tridev and Mohra in style and displayed his skills as a crisp editor in the edge of the seat thriller Gupt, disappoints."

=== Box office ===
The film was released worldwide on August 3, 2001. It collected ₹56 lakh at the domestic box office on the opening day. Its first weekend total collection in India was ₹1.52 crore and the film collected $155,000 from overseas, taking its first weekend total collection worldwide to ₹1.52 crore. The domestic first week collection totaled at ₹2.41 crore and the first week collections from overseas amounted to $215,000, taking its first week worldwide total to ₹5.05 crore. The film ran for eleven weeks in cinemas but collections declined in the coming weeks. It concluded its box office run with a total worldwide gross of ₹7.15 crore against a budget of ₹12 crore. It was termed a disaster at the box office.

== Music ==
Pyaar Ishq Aur Mohabbat

Soundtrack album by Viju Shah
- Released: 17 May 2001
- Recorded: 2000
- Label: Tips Music Films

The soundtrack album of Pyaar Ishq Aur Mohabbat was composed by regular Rajiv Rai loyalist Viju Shah contains eight tracks. The lyrics were penned by Anand Bakshi. It was released by the Tips Music Films label on 17 May 2001. The singers include Kumar Sanu, Hariharan, Udit Narayan, Sonu Nigam, Shaan (credited as Shantanu Mukherjee), Alka Yagnik, Kavita Krishnamurthy, Sadhana Sargam and Janki Iyer.

The album opens with the funky musical track "Apni Yaadon Ko" sung by Shaan. It is pictured on Arjun Rampal and marks his Bollywood debut. The song became very famous due to its excellent music and established Shaan as a household name. The next song "Chand Ho" is sung by Alka Yagnik and Sonu Nigam and it is pictured on Arjun Rampal, Monica Bedi and Aftab Shivdasani. This song samples "solitude" by German composer Karunesh .Arjun and Monica lip-synch the lyrics and Aftab is featured observing the two. The third song "Dono Taraf" is sung by Kumar Sanu and Kavita Krishnamurthy. It is pictured on Arjun Rampal, Sunil Shetty, Aftab Shivdasani, Kirti Reddy, Monica Bedi and Isha Koppikar at the closing credits of the movie.

The fourth track "Jab Tujhe Maine" is a romantic song by Udit Narayan and Sadhana Sargam. It is pictured on Aftab Shivdasani and Kirti Reddy in Aftab's dream sequence. It is followed by "Main Bewafa". The song features rock music performed by guitar. It is sung by Kumar Sanu and is pictured on Arjun Rampal. The sixth track "Pyaar Ishq Aur Mohabbat" is the title track sung by Udit Narayan and Alka Yagnik. It is a beautiful romantic ballad shot in the mountains of Switzerland and is pictured on Arjun Rampal and Kirti Reddy.

The seventh song is a classical romantic song "Tum Lakh Chupe Ho" by Hariharan and Janki Iyer. It is pictured on Sunil Shetty and Kirti Reddy in Sunil's dream sequence. The last track is the instrumental "Pyaar Ishq Aur Mohabbat (Theme)" featuring vocals from Shaan and Sadhana Sargam.Love on a Real Train by Tamperine Dreams was lifted and reworked by Viju Shah as part of the background score throughout the movie.The Sunil Shetty specific background score has been lifted from Dreams in Bloom:The Letter by Symphonex Orchestra.The Bagpiper music to welcome Kirti Reddy in Scotland is copied from Celtic Dance-The Landlord's Walk Blair Douglas.Viju has lifted considerably for the background music in this movie like in his previous movies like Tridev, Vishwatma, Mohra, Gupt: The Hidden Truth during his association with Rajiv Rai.

=== Reviews ===
The album received mainly positive reviews. Narbir Gosal from Planet Bollywood wrote: "Pyaar Ishq Aur Mohabbat is one of the more versatile album of the year. Carrying melodious, but very modernized songs, this album leaves everyone pleased. Viju Shah scores with each and every song except for Dono Taraf and the title theme track. This is his most experimental album and although he has used his synthesizer to the hilt (that is one aspect he really needs to change about his music), Viju has tried hard to incorporate some natural instruments (his favourite, the flute, being one of them) into his songs." SmasHits staff wrote "Pyaar Ishq Aur Mohabbat' is the album of the year so far. The Rai-Shah-Bakshi trio has scored again." Sukanya Verma of Rediff.com also gave favourable reviews.

Pyaar Ishq Aur Mohabbat: Original Motion Picture Soundtrack
No.	Title	Lyrics	Music	Singer(s)	Length
1.	"Apni Yaadon Ko"	Anand Bakshi	Viju Shah	Shantanu Mukherjee	4:40
2.	"Chand Ho"	Anand Bakshi	Viju Shah	Alka Yagnik, Sonu Nigam	5:14
3.	"Dono Taraf"	Anand Bakshi	Viju Shah	Kumar Sanu, Kavita Krishnamurthy	6:12
4.	"Jab Tujhe Maine"	Anand Bakshi	Viju Shah	Udit Narayan, Sadhana Sargam	5:45
5.	"Main Bewafa"	Anand Bakshi	Viju Shah	Kumar Sanu	4:35
6.	"Pyaar Ishq Aur Mohabbat"	Anand Bakshi	Viju Shah	Udit Narayan, Alka Yagnik	5:32
7.	"Tum Lakh Chupe Ho"	Anand Bakshi	Viju Shah	Hariharan, Janki Iyer	6:08
8.	"Pyaar Ishq Aur Mohabbat (Theme)"	Anand Bakshi	Viju Shah	Shantanu Mukherjee, Sadhana Sargam	5:04

== Awards ==
Awards and nominations
Distributor	Category	Recipient	Result
2nd IIFA Awards	Star Debut of the Year – Male	Arjun Rampal	Won
8th Star Screen Awards	Most Promising Newcomer – Male	Arjun Rampal	Won
47th Filmfare Awards	Best Male Debut	Arjun Rampal	Nominated
