= Yudh (film) =

- Film Poster
- Directed by: Rajiv Rai
- Written by: K.A. Narayan; Rajiv Rai; Naeem Shah
- Produced by: Gulshan Rai
- Starring: Jackie Shroff; Anil Kapoor; Tina Munim
- Cinematography: Romesh Bhalla
- Edited by: Naresh Malhotra
- Music by: Kalyanji Anandji
- Distributed by: Trimurti Films
- Release date: 3 May 1985
- Running time: 145 min
- Country: India
- Language: Hindi
- Box office: ₹4.3cr.

Yudh is a 1985 Indian Hindi-language action thriller film, produced by Gulshan Rai and marks the directorial debut of his son Rajiv Rai. The film features Jackie Shroff, Anil Kapoor (dual role), Tina Munim, Pran, Danny Denzongpa and Nutan in main roles with Hema Malini and Shatrughan Sinha in an extended special appearance.

== Plot ==
Savitri's twin baby sons are snatched by notorious criminal Gama Mateen, who demands a ransom in exchange for returning the sons to Savitri. Inspector Bhargav comes to the aid of Savitri but is himself killed in the process while trying to save the twins. Gama goes on the run taking one of the twins with him while the other is missing. After Inspector Bhargav's death, Savitri brings up Bhargav's son, Vikram, as her own son.

Many years later, Vikram has grown up to be a police inspector like his dad. Savitri's two children, who Savitri has not seen since they were babies, have grown up to be Public Prosecutor Avinash and an underworld criminal named Junior. Junior was brought up by Gama Mateen to become a sharpshooting hitman to kill off whoever Gama wants and Avinash is blamed each time for the killings. Avinash is also coincidentally the best friend of Vikram.

Vikram begins to suspect that Avinash is not all he seems when a witness named Moinddin Khan identifies Avinash as one of the men involved in a heist. Avinash protests his innocence and after many misunderstandings, it is discovered that his twin brother Junior is behind all the killings and heists. Vikram also discovers that his father had been killed by Gama Mateen when he was just a child so he sets out to avenge his father and reunite Savitri with her two sons.

Gama Mateen kidnaps Avinash and bring him to his cage. Avinash is shocked to see his lookalike, Junior. Both are not aware they are twin brothers and assume they only have facial resemblance. Gama sends Junior in Avinash's place to kill Savitri Devi. When Junior later discovers that Savitri Devi is his mother, he scolds Gama for sending him to kill his own mother. Gama sends his goon to kill Junior. When Vikram and Savitri find Junior's body, they think Avinash is dead but later they discover that Avinash is alive and he is with Gama. Vikram rescues Avinash and has a fight with Gama. When Gama is about to kill Vikram, Savitri shoots and kills Gama. Avinash is reunited with his mother.

== Cast ==
- Jackie Shroff as Police Inspector Vikram 'Vicky'
- Anil Kapoor as Avinash Rathod / Junior (double role)
- Tina Munim as Anita/Rita
- Hema Malini as Nafisa Khatun (Sp. App.)
- Shatrughan Sinha as Moinuddin Khan (Sp. App.)
- Nutan as Savitri Devi
- Danny Denzongpa as Chinoy/Gama Mateen
- Deven Verma as Police Inspector Sawant
- Pran as Deputy Commissioner Saxena
- Arun Govil as Inspector Bhargav
- Mahavir Shah as Defence Lawyer Arvind Kapoor
- Manmohan Krishna as Judge Narang
- Iftekhar as Commissioner Shyamlal Gupta
- Sharat Saxena as Baburao
- Satyendra Kapoor as Jaichand
- Praveen Kumar as Xaca
- Jagdish Raj as Bhatnagar
- Mac Mohan as Dadiyal
- Yunus Parvez as Policeman Saxena
- Bharat Bhushan as Pujari

== Soundtrack ==
The soundtrack was composed by Kalyanji-Anandji with lyrics by Anand Bakshi. Viju Shah composed the background score and the title track "Yudh Kar".

Song	Singer	Music director(s)
"Zindagi Ae Zindagi"	Kishore Kumar	Kalyanji-Anandji
"Yeh Hai Mujre Ki Raat Aakhiri"	Lata Mangeshkar	Kalyanji-Anandji
"Doston Tum Sabko"	Alka Yagnik, Amit Kumar, Shailendra Singh	Kalyanji-Anandji
"Kya Hua, Kya Nahin"	Amit Kumar, Asha Bhosle	Kalyanji-Anandji
"Main Kya Aise Pyar Karoongi"	Asha Bhosle, Mahendra Kapoor	Kalyanji-Anandji
"Yudh Kar" (Fast)	Alka Yagnik, Amit Kumar	Viju Shah
"Yudh Kar" (Slow)	Amit Kumar	Viju Shah

== Trivia ==
B.R. Chopra is seen as the dead passenger in the first scene post credits.
