= Zora (2025 film) =

- Directed by: Rajiv Rai
- Written by: Rajiv Rai; Raashid Rangrez
- Produced by: Rajiv Rai; Raashid Rangrez
- Starring: Ravinder Kuhar; Karan Vir; Sofia Parveen; Nikhil Dewan; Dilraj Kaur
- Cinematography: Lalit Sahoo
- Edited by: Rajiv Rai
- Music by: Viju Shah
- Production company: Trimurti Films
- Distributed by: Modern Movies Release
- Release date: August 8, 2025 (India)
- Running time: 125 minutes
- Country: India
- Language: Hindi

Zora is a 2025 Indian Hindi-language mystery thriller film directed, edited and produced by Rajiv Rai, who also co-wrote the screenplay with Raashid Rangrez. The film stars Ravinder Kuhar, Karan Vir, Sofia Parveen, Nikhil Dewan and Dilraj Kaur. It was released theatrically in India on 8 August 2025.

== Plot ==
In 2003, Jaipur police inspector Viraat Singh is investigating a criminal operation involving the production of counterfeit stamp papers. During the investigation, a mysterious female assassin known as Zora kills members of the gang as well as several police officers. Viraat takes possession of money seized during the operation and flees with his young son, Ranjit, to a safe house.

Zora tracks Viraat down and murders him by hanging him. Ranjit, who is hiding nearby, witnesses the killing but is unable to see the murderer's face. Zora and her associate John Lobo subsequently manipulate the evidence to make it appear that Viraat was responsible for the deaths and had taken the seized money for himself. His death is therefore treated as a suicide, and Viraat is posthumously disgraced and stripped of his reputation as an honest police officer.

Twenty years later, Ranjit has followed his father's career and become a sub-inspector in the Crime Branch. Although he initially appears timid, he secretly operates as a vigilante, killing dangerous criminals whom he believes have escaped justice. His superior, Inspector Iqbal, becomes suspicious of Ranjit's activities but cannot prove that he is responsible.

While investigating criminals connected with the old counterfeit-stamp-paper case, Ranjit begins searching for evidence that will clear his father's name and identify Zora. The investigation leads him to several women who could potentially be connected with the mysterious killer, including his mother, forensic specialist Kaur, doctor Vandana, and Freida Lobo, a Goan veterinarian.

The case becomes increasingly complicated when Zora appears to have returned after two decades. Ranjit's investigation also reveals connections between the original crime, John Lobo and several criminal figures. As he follows the clues surrounding the perfume associated with Zora, known as "Scent by the Devil", Ranjit attempts to determine which of the suspects is actually the killer.

The investigation eventually reveals the identity of Zora and exposes the circumstances surrounding Viraat's murder. Ranjit succeeds in pursuing the truth about his father's death, while the film closes with a glimpse setting up the story for a subsequent film.

== Cast ==
- Ravinder Kuhar as Ranjit Singh
- Karan Vir as Iqbal
- Sofia Parveen as Bindu Solanki
- Nikhil Dewan as Kamal Nath
- Dilraj Kaur as Kaur
- Meena Vaibhav as Seema
- Leena Sharma as Dr. Vandana
- Neetu Bhatt as Freida Lobo
- Sohani Kumari as Deepaa
- Gajendra Rathi as Narayan Solanki
- Tarun Kumar Chauhan as Commissioner of Police
- Nishant Verma as Gullu Gujjar
- Vikram Singh as Khabri
- Altaf Hussain as Kishori Lal
- Sharad Sharma as Dhannu Gujjar
- Manish Vashishth as Badru
- Niloy Banerjee as John Lobo
- Vikas Goswami as Viraat Singh
- Jai Kishan Mangwani as young Ranjit Singh
- Sujal Maharshi as young Gullu Gujjar
- Rony Kaula as Luka

The cast and character credits are based on the film's published cast and crew listings.

== Production ==
Zora was developed as a low-budget film by filmmaker Rajiv Rai under the Trimurti Films banner. The project marked Rai's return to directing after Asambhav (2004), and was conceived as an experiment in making and distributing a feature film outside the conventional Hindi film industry model. Rai chose an ensemble of relatively unknown actors rather than established stars, allowing the production to be completed on a substantially smaller budget. He later described the film as a roughly ₹2 crore production and said that he had deliberately avoided taking a major financial risk with the project.

According to Rai, Zora was originally conceived specifically for release on YouTube. He stated that the idea of releasing the film on YouTube had been on his mind for approximately four to five years before production, but that he initially did not know how to execute such a release. Rai also said that he did not approach traditional streaming services, believing that platforms would be reluctant to acquire a film without established stars in its cast. Instead, he intended Zora to serve as an experiment with digital distribution and to help establish Trimurti Films' own YouTube presence.

Despite its original digital-release strategy, Rai produced Zora using several technical specifications associated with theatrical exhibition. The film was shot in the 2.39:1 CinemaScope format and received a Dolby sound mix. Rai explained that these decisions were made to preserve a cinematic presentation and to leave the film technically prepared in case a major streaming platform subsequently showed interest. The completed film was also made available in 4K for its YouTube release.

The film's production was handled by Rajiv Rai, with Raashid Rangrez serving as producer and also contributing the dialogues, production design and associate direction. Shabana Khanam was the executive producer, while Rashmi Anand and Gaurav Rai served as associate producers. Lalit Sahoo was the director of photography. Viju Shah composed the music and background score, continuing his long-standing collaboration with Rai. The production also employed a comparatively compact crew, with Trimurti Films handling casting and Karan S. Parihar and Vikrant Tandon credited with line production.

Although Zora had been conceived for YouTube, Trimurti Films subsequently arranged a theatrical release. The official trailer announced a cinema release for 8 August 2025, and the film opened theatrically in India on that date. Rai later explained that the theatrical release was not as successful as he had hoped because the film was a small production with limited advertising expenditure, while several other films were released on the same date and competed for screens.

Following its theatrical run, Zora received its planned digital release on YouTube on 2 October 2025. The film was made available free of charge through the official YouTube channel of Trimurti Films, making the YouTube release an official second release rather than an unofficial upload or a later third-party distribution. Rai emphasized that the YouTube release had been part of his original plan for the film, rather than a decision prompted solely by the theatrical performance.

== Soundtrack ==
The soundtrack was composed by Viju Shah, with lyrics by Raashid Rangrez. The film contains one featured song, "Zora Hai Mera Naam", performed by Palak Muchhal. Shah also composed the film's background score.

Title	Singer	Lyrics	Music
"Zora Hai Mera Naam"	Palak Muchhal	Raashid Rangrez	Viju Shah

The title song was released as part of the film's promotional campaign. Contemporary coverage noted that the film's music strategy differed from Rai's earlier films, which were generally known for containing several songs.

== Release ==
Zora was released theatrically in India on 8 August 2025 in Hindi, with a runtime of approximately 125 minutes.

The film was subsequently released for free on YouTube on 2 October 2025 through the official Trimurti Films channel.

== Sequel ==
A sequel, titled Zora Zorawar, was developed by Rajiv Rai. Rai stated that the two films were connected and that the second film was intended to follow Zora after a short interval.
