= Gulshan Rai =

Indian film producer and distributor (1924–2004)

- Born: 2 March 1924; Lahore, Punjab, British India
- Died: 11 October 2004 (aged 80); Mumbai, Maharashtra, India
- Occupations: Film producer, Film distributor
- Family: Rajiv Rai (son)

Gulshan Madhosh Rai (2 March 1924 – 11 October 2004) was an Indian film producer and distributor. He produced successful films in the 1970s and 1980s directed by Vijay Anand, Yash Chopra and Subhash Ghai and thereafter directed by his son Rajiv Rai.

Rai was born in Lahore in 1924. Following the partition of India he moved to Mumbai in 1947. He started off his career in the Hindi film industry as a distributor. In 1970, he started his production company Trimurti Films and the first film produced was Dev Anand starrer Johny Mera Naam (lit.Johny is my name), directed by Vijay Anand which was a success.

In the 1970s, his Yash Chopra-directed films made Amitabh Bachchan a superstar and launched successful careers for script writers Salim–Javed. The notable films were Deewaar (lit.The Wall) (1975) and Trishul (lit.The Trident) (1978).

In the 1980s he produced Dilip Kumar starrer Vidhaata, directed by Subhash Ghai later he produced films in the action genre directed by his son Rajiv Rai. A majority of his films were notable for their music composed by Kalyanji-Anandji & later by Viju Shah. They were Johny Mera Naam, Vidhaata, Tridev (lit.The three gods), Vishwatma, Mohra (lit.The Pawn) and Gupt (lit.Secret).

He released more than 180 films in Bombay territory, 40 of which have celebrated silver jubilees. Besides Mumbai, he also opened distribution offices in West Bengal, Punjab, Delhi and Uttar Pradesh.

However, Trimurti Films suffered failures with Rajiv's movies in 2000s, Pyaar Ishq Aur Mohabbat (lit.Love, Amour and Romance) and Asambhav (lit.Impossible), both were attempts to launch Arjun Rampal as a hero but flopped and were unable to make Rampal, a successful hero.

Rai died in Mumbai on 11 October 2004 after a prolonged illness, aged 80.

== Filmography as Producer ==
Year	Title	Director
1970	Johny Mera Naam	Vijay Anand
1973	Joshila	Yash Chopra
1975	Deewaar	Yash Chopra
1977	Dream Girl	Pramod Chakravorty
1978	Trishul	Yash Chopra
1982	Vidhaata	Subhash Ghai
1985	Yudh	Rajiv Rai
1989	Tridev	Rajiv Rai
1992	Vishwatma	Rajiv Rai
1994	Mohra	Rajiv Rai
1997	Gupt: The Hidden Truth	Rajiv Rai
2001	Pyaar Ishq Aur Mohabbat	Rajiv Rai
2004	Asambhav	Rajiv Rai

== See also ==
- List of Indians
- Cinema of India
