= Mohra =

1994 Indian Hindi film by Rajiv Rai

- Poster
- Directed by: Rajiv Rai
- Written by: Dilip Shukla (dialogues)
- Screenplay by: Rajiv Rai; Shabbir Boxwala
- Story by: Rajiv Rai
- Produced by: Gulshan Rai
- Starring: Naseeruddin Shah; Akshay Kumar; Sunil Shetty; Raveena Tandon; Poonam Jhawer; Raza Murad; Paresh Rawal; Gulshan Grover; Sadashiv Amrapurkar
- Cinematography: Damodar Naidu
- Edited by: Rajiv Rai
- Music by: Viju Shah
- Production company: Trimurti Films
- Release date: 1 July 1994
- Running time: 177 minutes
- Country: India
- Language: Hindi
- Budget: ₹3.75 crore
- Box office: ₹22.65 crore

Mohra (transl. Pawn) is a 1994 Indian Hindi-language action thriller film co-written, edited and directed by Rajiv Rai and produced by his father Gulshan Rai. It stars Naseeruddin Shah, Akshay Kumar, Sunil Shetty, Raveena Tandon, Poonam Jhawer, Raza Murad, Paresh Rawal, Gulshan Grover, and Sadashiv Amrapurkar. The film was also the first collaboration among the trio of Akshay Kumar, Sunil Shetty and Paresh Rawal, who went on to collaborate several times later on.

Following the success of Rajiv Rai's previous film Vishwatma, Divya Bharti was cast as the female lead. Due to her death very early during the production, Raveena Tandon was cast as her replacement. The film was reported to be inspired by the 1987 film Death Wish 4: The Crackdown while the climax was inspired by the 1992 Hong Kong film, Hard Boiled. The film was remade in Bengali, in Bangladesh, as Gupto Ghatak (1998).

The film was a box office success, and went on to become the second highest-grossing Indian film of that year, behind Hum Aapke Hain Koun. It received nine Filmfare Award nominations in 1995 at the 40th Filmfare Awards including Best Film, Best Director, and Best Music Director. Songs of the film also became huge chartbusters in that year. The film's soundtrack album sold more than 8 million units, making it the second highest-selling Bollywood soundtrack album of 1994.

== Plot ==
Vishal Agnihotri is serving a life sentence in prison for murdering four criminals who gang raped and killed his sister-in-law, Rita. The perpetrators were acquitted with help from a corrupt public prosecutor, and soon after they attempted to rape Vishal's wife, resulting in her suicide.

Journalist Roma Singh visits Vishal in prison, but some inmates attempt to sexually assault her, and Vishal comes to her rescue. Roma decides to help Vishal regain his freedom. She meets Inspector Amar Saxena to obtain Vishal's case file and love blossoms between them. Roma's employer, Sandeep Jindal, a blind man, reopens Vishal's case by presenting new evidence. The judge reviewing the case accepts the new evidence and Vishal is acquitted.

Jindal convinces Vishal that the city is full of crime and he wants him to eliminate mob bosses Jibran, Tyson and their associates, as well as Kamdev Kulkarni, the Commissioner of Police. Vishal refuses saying that he cannot commit murder again, but then returns to Jindal after reminiscing his past. Vishal begins eliminating everyone on Jindal's hitlist one after the other, alternating between Jibran's gang and Tyson's gang, in order to incite a rivalry between them.

After being informed by Sub-Inspector Kashinath that Vishal is responsible for killing his gang members, Jibran calls Tyson to meet and clear up their misunderstanding. During the meeting, Vishal snipes Tyson's arm, causing both gangs to start shooting in which most of the gangsters are killed. Vishal then kills Tyson, but Jibran survives and pursues Vishal. Amar suspects and follows Vishal closely for the murders but is unable to gather any evidence against him.

Vishal overhears a conversation between Kamdev and Constable Kranti Kumar and realises Kamdev is not corrupt. Vishal decides to spare Kamdev. Jindal is infuriated with Vishal for not killing Kamdev. It is then revealed that Jindal is not blind and he was using Vishal as a Mohra (pawn) to eliminate his rivals.

Vishal is about to shoot Jindal, but Jibran arrives and saves Jindal. Jindal tells Vishal that in the past he had approached Jibran and Tyson to sell drugs. He fatally shot his friend Inspector Karan Saxena (Amar's father) and strangled his wife to death when they found out about his crimes. Jindal thereafter pretended to be blind to avoid prosecution, and deceive Jibran and Tyson. Jindal and Jibran leave Vishal to die by placing a bomb next to him but he escapes.

Amar breaks into Vishal's house and discovers a file with details of all of Vishal's targets. Amar locates Vishal at Roma's residence and reveals that he has the file, leaving no room for denial regarding the killings, and tells him to surrender, but a fist fight ensues, resulting in Amar knocking Vishal out. Vishal is taken into custody.

Kashinath informs Jindal that Vishal is alive and will soon reveal the truth. Shortly after, Jindal reveals his true identity and attraction for Roma and demands she marry him. His newspaper's editor Siddiqui sees this, but is killed by Jindal. Kamdev releases Vishal. Vishal tells Amar the truth about Jindal and that Jindal is Karan's murderer. Amar, Vishal and Kamdev go to Jindal's office, but they find Siddiqui’s body instead. Jindal calls and says he has kidnapped Roma. Kashinath helps Vishal and Amar trace Jindal to an abandoned fort where other drug lords have also assembled.

Amar and Vishal kill the drug lords. Jindal forces Roma to go with him but is stopped by Vishal. Jindal holds him hostage and tries to embarrass Amar at gunpoint, but Vishal breaks away and gets shot by Jindal, as Amar shoots Jindal. Vishal dies in Amar's lap, acknowledging that Amar was right and Vishal chose the wrong path for himself. Roma and Amar get married.

== Cast ==
- Naseeruddin Shah as Sandeep Jindal, the main antagonist.
- Akshay Kumar as Inspector Amar Saxena, Roma's love interest, Karan's son.
- Sunil Shetty as Vishal Agnihotri, Priya's husband and widower.
- Raveena Tandon as Roma Singh, Amar's love interest.
- Poonam Jhawer as Priya Agnihotri, Vishal's wife, (extended cameo)
- Raza Murad as Jibran, a drug lord
- Paresh Rawal as Sub-Inspector Kashinath Sahoo
- Gulshan Grover as Tyson, a drug lord
- Sadashiv Amrapurkar as Police Commissioner Kamdev Kulkarni
- Sonali Singh as Rita, Priya's sister. (special appearance)
- Kulbhushan Kharbanda as Mr Singh, the Jailor and Roma's father.
- Avtar Gill as Inspector Karan Saxena, Amar's father.
- Priya Tendulkar as Pooja, Sandeep Jindal's wife who is murdered by him
- Aparajita Bhushan as Karan's wife and widow and Amar's mother.
- Kunika as Flora, Tyson's associate
- Tej Sapru as Irfan, Jibran's nephew.
- Dinesh Anand as Desai, Jindal's secretary
- Razak Khan as Rizwan, Jibran's brother.
- Vishwajeet Pradhan as Jackson, Tyson's brother.
- Yunus Parvez as Siddiqui, an editor
- Harish Patel as Constable Kranti Kumar
- Vinay Sapru as Tony, Rita's friend.
- Gavin Packard as Douglas, a drug lord
- John Gabriel as Ranpal
- Anil Yadav as Minto
- Anil Nagrath as Judge
- Ramesh Goyal as Advocate Khanna

== Soundtrack ==
Mohra

Soundtrack album by Viju Shah
- Released: 2 April 1994
- Studio: Trimurti Films
- Genre: Feature film soundtrack
- Length: 42:16
- Language: Hindi
- Label: Venus Records & Tapes
- Producer: Viju Shah

Viju Shah chronology
| Vishwatama (1992) | Mohra (1994) | Gupt (1997) |

The music for the film was composed by Viju Shah, with lyrics by Indeevar and Anand Bakshi. Mohra was one of the most successful soundtrack albums of 1994, especially the song "Tu Cheez Badi Hai Mast". The track is based on the popular Qawwali song "Dam Mast Qalandar Mast Mast" by Nusrat Fateh Ali Khan, and is set to Raag Bhimpalasi (known as Abheri in Carnatic Music). Initially, Viju Shah wanted Sapna Mukherjee to render "Tu Cheez Badi Hai Mast" but, upon Rajiv Rai's insistence, opted for Kavita Krishnamurthy instead. The song "Na Kajre Ki Dhaar" was composed in the 1970s by Kalyanji-Anandji, the father and uncle of Viju Shah, and sung by Mukesh, for a shelved film, meaning and was unreleased. Viju Shah added the song to this film, and got singers Pankaj Udhas and Sadhana Sargam to sing it. As earlier song was a solo, Indeevar was approached two decades later to write additional verses for the female singer. Anand Bakhshi had written the song "Ae Kaash Kahin Aisa Hota" for Dilip Kumar's unreleased movie "Kalinga", but was finally used in Mohra. Several of the songs took inspiration from artists from around the world including "Tu Cheez Badi Hai Mast" and "Tip Tip Barsa Paani".

The film's soundtrack album sold more than 8 million units, making it the second highest-selling Bollywood soundtrack album of 1994, behind only Hum Aapke Hain Koun..! The soundtrack was #81 on the list of "100 Greatest Bollywood Soundtracks of All Time", as compiled by Planet Bollywood. The song "Tu Cheez Badi Hai Mast Mast" was remade as "Cheez Badi" for the 2017 film Machine. The song "Tip Tip Barsa Pani" was remade as "Tip Tip" for the 2021 film Sooryavanshi. The background score consisted of plagiarised versions of "The Terminator theme" and "I feel you (Babylon Mix)" by Depeche Mode.

Mohra (Original Motion Picture Soundtrack)

| # | Title | Singer(s) | Lyrics | Raga |
|---|---|---|---|---|
| 1. | "Na Kajre Ki Dhaar" | Pankaj Udhas, Sadhana Sargam, Suniel Shetty, Poonam Jhawer | Indeevar | |
| 2. | "Subah Se Lekar" | Udit Narayan, Sadhana Sargam | Anand Bakshi | |
| 3. | "Kaash Kahin Aisa Hota" | Kumar Sanu | Anand Bakshi | |
| 4. | "Dil Har Koi" | Kumar Sanu, Alka Yagnik | Indeevar | |
| 5. | "Tip Tip Barsa Pani" | Udit Narayan, Alka Yagnik | Anand Bakshi | |
| 6. | "Tu Cheez Badi Hai Mast" | Udit Narayan, Kavita Krishnamurthy | Anand Bakshi | Bhimpalasi |
| 7. | "Na Kajare Ki Tasveer Teri" (Male) | Pankaj Udhas | Indeevar | |
| 8. | "Na Kajare Ki Koi Aur Nahi" (Female) | Sadhana Sargam | Indeevar | |
| 9. | "Main Cheez Badi Hoon" | Kavita Krishnamurthy | Anand Bakshi | Bhimpalasi |

== Box office ==
It was the 2nd-highest-grossing film of 1994.

== Awards ==
40th Filmfare Awards:

Won

- Best Choreography – Chinni Prakash for "Tu Cheez Badi Hai"

Nominated

- Best Film – Gulshan Rai
- Best Director – Rajiv Rai
- Best Comedian – Paresh Rawal
- Best Villain – Naseeruddin Shah
- Best Music Director – Viju Shah
- Best Lyricist – Anand Bakshi for "Tu Cheez Badi Hai"
- Best Male Playback Singer – Udit Narayan for "Tu Cheez Badi Hai"
- Best Female Playback Singer – Kavita Krishnamurthy for "Tu Cheez Badi Hai"
