= Vishwatma =

1992 Indian Hindi film by Rajiv Rai

- Theatrical release poster
- Directed by: Rajiv Rai
- Written by: Rajiv Rai
- Produced by: Gulshan Rai
- Starring: Naseeruddin Shah; Sunny Deol; Chunky Pandey; Sonam; Divya Bharti; Jyotsna Singh; Raza Murad; Gulshan Grover; Amrish Puri
- Narrated by: Naseeruddin Shah
- Cinematography: Thomas A. Xavier
- Edited by: Rajiv Rai
- Music by: Viju Shah
- Production company: Trimurti Films
- Distributed by: Trimurti Films
- Release date: 24 January 1992
- Running time: 181 minutes
- Country: India
- Language: Hindi
- Box office: ₹9.5 crore

Vishwatma (transl. Universal Soul) is a 1992 Indian Hindi-language action thriller film directed by Rajiv Rai and produced by Gulshan Rai. It stars an ensemble cast of Naseeruddin Shah, Sunny Deol, Chunky Pandey, Sonam, Divya Bharti (in her Hindi debut), Jyostna Singh, Raza Murad, Gulshan Grover and Amrish Puri.

The story of the film revolves around an Indian police officer, who is tasked to capture a powerful, internationally operating crime lord and bring him back to India.

Vishwatma marked Rai's third directorial venture after Tridev (1989) and was initially planned to be a sequel to the same. It was the most-expensive Indian film at the time of its production; being extensively shot in Kenya and the first Indian film to be shot there. The song "Saat Samundar Paar" was shot at Bubbles Discothèque, a nightclub in Nairobi. The song gained a cult status among Indian audience.

The film was a commercial success and received critical acclaim upon release from contemporary as well as modern critics, with praise drawn towards its screenplay and action sequences. It earned over ₹95 million in its total theatrical run worldwide and was the sixth highest-grossing Indian film of 1992. It proved to be a major launchpad for debutanté Divya Bharti, who went on to achieve the limelight in Bollywood.

== Plot ==
Inspector Prabhat Singh is an honest and dedicated Indian police officer, but he usually has no time for his family and due to this, his father is constantly at loggerheads with him. Prabhat's father believes in peace and opposes violence. Prabhat is now placed on a mission to apprehend the most dreaded crime Lord, Ajgar Jurrat, who currently lives in Kenya but operates in India. Ajgar has a rivalry with another Crime Lord, Madan Bharadwaj. Ajgar plans to kill Madan and his brothers in a single move. But the youngest Bharadwaj brother, Akash, who is not involved in any criminal activities of his mafia brothers, overhears Ajgar. He tries to stop Ajgar but fails when Prabhat arrives at the scene and arrests Akash while Ajgar's gang flees from the spot. Akash requests Prabhat to save his brothers. Prabhat goes to Bharadwaj's place but Ajgar was able to eliminate the Bhardwajs before his arrival and Ajgar's son Rajnag, raped Madan's wife, the lone survivor of the massacre. While escaping, Ajgar's brother, Nagdansh was fatally shot by Prabhat.

Ajgar, enraged by the death of his younger brother, abducts and kills Prabhat's younger brother, Munna. Prabhat's family is devastated and his father blames him for Munna's death and disowns him. Prabhat leaves his job and moves to a remote corner of a distant village in India, where he takes in an orphan named Babu, who is his only friend.

With Ajgar's increasing criminal activities, the police commissioner decides to approach Prabhat as he is the only one who can capture Ajgar and take him back to India. After seeing the necessity of the situation, Prabhat's father also changes his mind and decides to apologise for disowning Prabhat. To make amends, he tries to persuade Prabhat to take on the mission to capture Ajgar and bring him to justice.

Prabhat is reinstated and agrees to take on the mission but insists that Akash also assists him, to which Akash agrees. They take the flight to Kenya. Meanwhile, Babu goes to live with Prabhat's family.

In Kenya, they are met by their host, an honest Kenyan police officer of Indian origin, Surya Pratap, a widower with a young daughter. Ajgar is already aware that Prabhat and Akash are there to capture him, so he convinces the Nairobi Police Commissioner to assign Surya to be their guide, knowing fully well that the law-abiding Surya will make sure that Kenyan citizens like Ajgar will not be harmed by foreigners. Surya explicitly tells Prabhat and Akash, that he has his eyes on them and will not hesitate to apprehend them if they do any mischief during their stay.

Prabhat and Akash find and meet Madan's sister-in-law Renuka, who's also seeking vengeance, so she helps them get nearer to Ajgar and offers them some more details on his whereabouts. She informs them that Ajgar is a respected citizen in Kenya, so it is much harder to apprehend him. They try many tricks to capture Ajgar and his henchmen, but Surya foils them each time. Prabhat and Akash then try to persuade Surya to arrest Ajgar, but Surya is reluctant to put Ajgar behind bars. As a result, Surya gets very frustrated with the duo, because he thinks they are causing trouble in Kenya.

After a few days with the help of Renuka, Prabhat and Akash make a breakthrough to apprehend Ajgar without Surya's knowledge and decide to make their move right away. Upon hearing this, a furious and betrayed Surya arrests them to be deported back to India. Renuka informs Surya about the truth behind his wife's mysterious death: his wife died while trying to escape from Rajnag who attempted to rape her. After learning the truth and realising that Prabhat and Akash were right after all, an enraged Surya confronts Ajgar but is captured along with his daughter. Prabhat and Akash, who have escaped their flight to India, rescue Surya, and the three join hands in the mission to catch Ajgar and his henchmen.

In the end, the mission is successful. Prabhat brings Ajgar and his son, Rajnag, back to India. Ajgar and Rajnag attempt to escape but are fatally shot by Prabhat, Surya and Akash.

== Cast ==
- Naseeruddin Shah as Inspector Surya Pratap – Kenyan police officer
- Sunny Deol as Inspector Prabhat Singh – Indian police officer
- Chunky Pandey as Akash Bharadwaj
- Sonam as Renuka – Surya's love interest
- Divya Bharti as Kusum Verma – Prabhat's fiancée
- Jyotsna Singh as Sonia Jurhat – Akash's girlfriend
- Raza Murad as Commissioner Pandey
- Gulshan Grover as Tapasvi Gunjal
- Amrish Puri as Ajgar Jurhat
- Dalip Tahil as DCP Gupta
- Sharat Saxena as Roy – Kenyan Police Commissioner
- Tej Sapru as Bada Nilu
- Mahesh Anand as Rajnag Jurhat – Ajgar’s son
- Dan Dhanoa as Majhla Nilu
- Anand Balraj as Chhota Nilu
- Alok Nath as Anurag Singh – Prabhat’s father
- Aparajita as Anurag's wife – Prabhat’s mother
- Sanjay Kohli as Inspector Balbir
- Rajesh Vivek as Dacait Manohar Dev
- Yunus Parvez as Mr Verma
- Dinesh Hingoo as Mr Sharma
- Vijay Arora as Jailer Suryabhan
- Master Manjunath as Babu
- Master Sadique as Munna – Prabhat’s younger brother
- Baby Ashrafa as Sunaina – Surya’s daughter
- Kiran Kumar (special appearance) as Nagdansh Jurhat – Ajgar’s younger brother
- Kiran Juneja (guest appearance) as Madan’s wife – Renuka’s elder sister
- Mangal Dhillon (guest appearance) as Madan Bharadwaj – Akash’s elder brother
- Ram Mohan as Kabir
- Vikas Anand as Mantri Mohan Kumar
- Poonam Shetty as Surya’s late wife, Sunaina’s late mother
- Amit Bhalla as Ranjeet
- Salim Khan as Niranjan
- Arshad Parvez as Dharmesh
- Jairuz Ounza as Chandan
- Dan Opar as Robert
- Tomboo the Chimp
- Ali Khan as Gaffoor bhai
- Vishwajeet Pradhan as Madan and Vishal’s brother
- Samar Jai Singh as Madan and Vishal’s brother

== Production ==
After the success of his 1989 film Tridev, Rajiv Rai decided to embark on another action-thriller with three main male leads, and thus Vishwatma was conceived. Rai decided to go for a change of venue and planned to set much of the movie in Kenya. He wanted to cast the same three male leads as Tridev (Naseeruddin Shah, Sunny Deol, and Jackie Shroff). However, Shroff's son Tiger had just been born and his astrologer had advised him to not travel abroad for a year. Thus Rai, after considering to launch Suniel Shetty, a personal friend, opted to cast Chunky Pandey instead of Shroff as the third lead.

== Soundtrack ==
Vishwatma (Original Motion Picture Soundtrack)

Soundtrack album by Viju Shah
- Released: September 1991
- Recorded: 1991
- Genres: Motion Picture Soundtrack, Filmi
- Length: 48:11
- Language: Hindi
- Label: His Master's Voice
- Producer: Viju Shah

Viju Shah chronology
Tridev (1989)	Vishwatma (Original Motion Picture Soundtrack) (1991)	Mohra (1994)

After the success of the music of Tridev, everyone expected Viju Shah to conjure magic with this film. The lyrics of the songs were penned by Anand Bakshi. The soundtrack was well received, selling 2 million units and becoming the year's seventh best-selling Bollywood soundtrack album.

For the 2014 movie Kick, the producer Sajid Nadiadwala bought the rights to the song "Saat Samundar" for Rs 1.5 crore. He did this to pay tribute to his late first wife Divya Bharti, on whom the song was picturised in Vishwatma. In Kick, the song plays in the background when Mithun Chakraborty and Salman Khan are dancing in a disco.

All the songs were penned by Anand Bakshi.

"Saat Samundar Paar" was sampled from the song "Heart" by Pet Shop Boys.

Track list

#	Title	Singer(s)
1.	"Title"	Naseeruddin Shah
2.	"Dil Le Gayi Teri Bindiya" (Part I)	Amit Kumar, Sapna Mukherjee, Mohammad Aziz & Udit Narayan
3.	"Saat Samundar Paar" (Part I)	Sadhana Sargam
4.	"Saat Samundar Paar" (Part II)	Sadhana Sargam
5.	"Aadmi Zindagi" (Part I)	Mohammad Aziz
6.	"Aadmi Zindagi" (Part II)	Mohammad Aziz
7.	"Toofan"	Amit Kumar, Alka Yagnik, Sadhana Sargam, Sapna Mukherjee & Boney
8.	"Aankhon Mein Hai Kya"	Udit Narayan, Alka Yagnik, Mohammad Aziz & Sadhana Sargam
9.	"Saat Samundar Paar" (Part III)	Udit Narayan & Jolly Mukherjee
10.	"Aadmi Zindagi" (Part III)	Mohammad Aziz
11.	"Dil Le Gaye Teri Bindiya" (Part II)	Mohammad Aziz, Udit Narayan, Kumar Sanu, Sadhana Sargam & Sapna Mukherjee
12.	"Title"	Naseeruddin Shah
