= Rajiv Rai =

Indian director (born 1955)

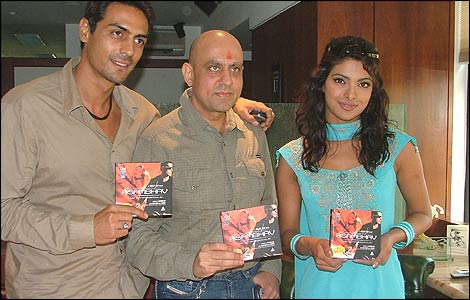
- Rai (center) with Arjun Rampal and Priyanka Chopra during the music launch of Asambhav (2004)
- Born: 18 July 1955 (age 71)
- Occupation: Film director
- Years active: 1975–2004; 2022–present
- Spouse: Sonam (m. 1991; div. 2016)
- Children: 1
- Father: Gulshan Rai

Rajiv Gulshan Rai (born 18 July 1955) is an Indian film director, screenwriter and film editor. The son of producer Gulshan Rai, he has directed many films under his father's production company, Trimurti Films, including blockbusters like Tridev (1989), Vishwatma (1992), Mohra (1994) and Gupt (1997). He was married to actress Sonam from 1991 to 2016 and has a son with her.

== Career ==
Rai started his career as an assistant for his father Gulshan Rai's distribution and productions.

He eventually made his debut as a director with the 1985 hit action film Yudh. He went on to write and direct several super-hit films in the action and thriller genres: Tridev (1989), Vishwatma (1992), Mohra (1994), and Gupt (1997). His films are also notable for their hit music composed by Kalyanji-Anandji (in Tridev) and Viju Shah in all his subsequent films. After a four-year hiatus from the Bollywood industry, he returned to directing by introducing Arjun Rampal with his comeback venture Pyaar Ishq Aur Mohabbat (2001). This was an attempt by Rai at directing a romantic drama, a change from his previous action films. The film failed at the box office and Rai returned to the action genre with his next film Asambhav (2004), again starring Arjun Rampal, which also failed to do well. Shortly after the release of Asambhav, his father died at the age of 80 of a prolonged illness.

Following a sabbatical of two decades, Rai announced his return to direction in 2022 with a production titled Zora.

== Legacy ==
Rajiv Rai is known for launching the careers of many Bollywood actors and actresses and giving many artists their breakthrough in the industry.

Anil Kapoor's iconic tagline "Jhakaas" that became associated with him throughout his career, was first assigned to him by Rai in Yudh (1985).

Kajol, known for her image as a lovable heroine in films like Dilwale Dulhania Le Jayenge, got her first negative role in Gupt (1997), for which she received critical acclaim and became the first female actor to win the Filmfare Award for Best Performance in a Negative Role. The film also established Bobby Deol in Bollywood.

Arjun Rampal was introduced in Bollywood as a lead hero in Rai's film Pyaar Ishq Aur Mohabbat (2001).

Along with artists, Rai is also known for launching the career of Viju Shah in Bollywood. Shah assisted his father and uncle, the popular Kalyanji-Anandji duo during the music composition of Yudh, during which Rai and Shah became good friends. With the permission of Kalyanji-Anandji, Rai introduced Shah as a music director in Tridev. Kalyanji-Anandji's name appeared in the film credits but Shah was credited as a music arranger, before finally being credited as the music director in Vishwatma. Shah has been Rai's frequent collaborator, composing music for all of Rai's subsequent films.

== Personal life ==
In 1991, he married Bollywood actress Sonam, whom he had directed in Tridev and Vishwatma. They have a son, Gaurav Rai (born 1992). They divorced in 2016.

In 1997, he had to leave India with his family for UK after escaping an assassination attempt by a hitmen believed to be working for the Mumbai underworld leader Abu Salem.

== Filmography ==
Year	Film	Notes
1985	Yudh	Screenplay, Director
1989	Tridev	Writer, Screenplay, Director
1992	Vishwatma	Screenplay, Director
1994	Mohra	Screenplay, Director; Nominated - Filmfare Award for Best Director
1997	Gupt	Editor, Screenplay, Director; Winner - Filmfare Award for Best Editing; Nominated - Filmfare Award for Best Director
2001	Pyaar Ishq Aur Mohabbat	Editor, Screenplay, Producer, Director
2004	Asambhav	Editor, Screenplay, Producer, Director
2025	Zora	Story, Editor, Screenplay, Producer, Director
2026	Zora Zorawar (2026)	Story, Editor, Screenplay, Producer, Director
