= Trimurti Films =

Indian film production house

Trimurti Films Pvt. Ltd.
- Industry: Motion pictures
- Founded: Mumbai, Maharashtra, India (1969)
- Headquarters: Mumbai, Maharashtra, India
- Key people: Gulshan Rai (Founder); Rajiv Rai (Owner)
- Products: Motion pictures

Trimurti Films Pvt. Ltd. is an Indian film production house founded by Gulshan Rai in 1969. After Rai's death, his son Rajiv Rai took over as the head of the company. Their first production was Johny Mera Naam (1970). They subsequently produced notable films like Deewaar, Trishul, Vidhaata, Tridev, Vishwatma, Mohra and Gupt.

Dormant for more than a decade, the company's last production was Asambhav (2004). The banner has been re-launched in 2022 by Rajiv Rai who is back with direction after 18 years with Zora & Zora Zoravar.

== Films produced by Trimurti Films ==
Year	Film	Director	Cast
1970	Johny Mera Naam	Vijay Anand	Dev Anand, Hema Malini
1973	Joshila	Yash Chopra	Dev Anand, Hema Malini
1975	Deewaar	Yash Chopra	Amitabh Bachchan, Shashi Kapoor, Neetu Singh, Parveen Babi, Nirupa Roy
1977	Dream Girl	Pramod Chakravorty	Dharmendra, Hema Malini, Ashok Kumar
1978	Trishul	Yash Chopra	Sanjeev Kumar, Shashi Kapoor, Amitabh Bachchan, Raakhee, Hema Malini, Poonam Dhillon
1982	Vidhaata	Subhash Ghai	Dilip Kumar, Shammi Kapoor, Sanjeev Kumar, Sanjay Dutt, Padmini Kolhapure
1985	Yudh	Rajiv Rai	Anil Kapoor, Jackie Shroff, Tina Munim, Nutan, Danny Denzongpa
1989	Tridev	Rajiv Rai	Naseeruddin Shah, Sunny Deol, Jackie Shroff, Madhuri Dixit, Sangeeta Bijlani, Sonam
1992	Vishwatma	Rajiv Rai	Naseeruddin Shah, Sunny Deol, Chunky Pandey, Divya Bharti, Sonam
1994	Mohra	Rajiv Rai	Akshay Kumar, Suniel Shetty, Raveena Tandon, Naseeruddin Shah
1997	Gupt	Rajiv Rai	Bobby Deol, Manisha Koirala, Kajol
2001	Pyaar Ishq Aur Mohabbat	Rajiv Rai	Sunil Shetty, Aftab Shivdasani, Arjun Rampal, Kirti Reddy, Isha Koppikar, Monica Bedi
2004	Asambhav	Rajiv Rai	Arjun Rampal, Priyanka Chopra, Naseeruddin Shah
2025	Zora	Rajiv Rai	Ravinder Kuhar, Karan Vir, Nikhil Dewan, Sofia Parveen, Dilraj Kaur
