= Johny Mera Naam =

1970 film by Vijay Anand

- Film poster
- Directed by: Vijay Anand
- Written by: Vijay Anand; K.A. Narayan
- Produced by: Gulshan Rai
- Starring: Dev Anand; Hema Malini; Pran; Jeevan; Premnath; I. S. Johar; Padma Khanna
- Cinematography: Fali Mistry
- Edited by: Vijay Anand
- Music by: Kalyanji-Anandji
- Production company: Trimurti Films
- Distributed by: Trimurti Films; Prasad Productions Pvt. Ltd.
- Release date: 20 November 1970
- Running time: 161 minutes
- Country: India
- Language: Hindi
- Box office: ₹8 crore

Johny Mera Naam (transl. Johny is my name) is a 1970 Indian Hindi-language action spy film directed by Vijay Anand. The film stars the director's brother, Dev Anand and Pran in the roles of brothers separated in childhood. Hema Malini, Jeevan, Premnath, I. S. Johar, Iftekhar, Padma Khanna also star in pivotal roles.

At the 18th Filmfare Awards, Vijay Anand won the Filmfare Best Screenplay Award for this film, while I.S. Johar received his first Best Performance in a Comic Role for his triple roles: a steward in an aeroplane, an associate of criminals and a police officer. The film was remade in Tamil as Raja (1972), in Telugu as Eduruleni Manishi (1975) and in Kannada as Apoorva Sangama (1984).

== Synopsis ==
The story revolves around Mohan and Sohan, who are the sons of a police inspector. The kids excel in boxing. Their father is killed by a goon following orders from Ranjit. Upon seeing this, Mohan stabs the goon, mistakenly thinks that he has committed murder, takes refuge in Ranjit's car boot, and goes missing.

Years later, Sohan goes on to become a CID officer called Sohan Kumar, who solves his cases, taking up different guises. He takes the identity of Johny, a petty thief and gets himself in jail, befriends Heera, solves a case, woos Rekha and finds the criminal. Finally, Rekha finds her father, who was imprisoned in Ranjit's place and with Sohan's help, rescues him from Ranjit, who is handed over to the police. Heera informs Mohan about Johny's real identity, leading to a confrontation between Mohan and Sohan. In the midst of this conflict, they both realise that they are long-lost brothers. In the end, they are reunited with their mother, and the stolen jewels from the Radha Krishna temple are also returned.

== Cast ==
- Dev Anand as Sohan / Johny / Usman Ali / Jugalkishore
- Hema Malini as Rekha
- Pran as Mohan / Moti
- Jeevan as Heera
- Premnath as Ranjeet / Rai Sahib Bhupendra Singh
- I. S. Johar as Pehlaram / Dujaram / Teejaram (Triple Role)
- Iftekhar as Chief Inspector Mehta
- Sulochana Latkar as Mother
- Padma Khanna as Tara
- Randhawa as Babu

== Production ==
The song "O Mere Raja" was shot on location at the ruins of Nalanda and the peace pagoda of Rajgir, both in Bihar.

== Box office ==
It was the highest grossing Bollywood film of 1970.

== Soundtrack ==
Johny Mera Naam

Soundtrack album by Kalyanji Anandji
- Released: 1970
- Genre: Film soundtrack
- Language: Hindi
- Label: Polydor

The music was composed by the duo Kalyanji-Anandji and lyrics were penned by Indeevar and Rajendra Krishan.

No.	Title	Singer(s)	Length
1.	"O Babul Pyare"	Lata Mangeshkar
2.	"Mose Mora Shyam Rootha"	Lata Mangeshkar
3.	"Nafrat Karnewalon Ke"	Kishore Kumar
4.	"Palbhar Ke Liye Koi Hamen Pyar Kar Le, Jhutha Hi Sahi"	Kishore Kumar, Usha Khanna
5.	"O Mere Raja, Khafa Na Hona, Der Se Aayi, Door Se Aayi"	Kishore Kumar, Asha Bhosle
6.	"Husn Ke Lakhon Rang"	Asha Bhosle

== Popular culture ==
- The song "Pal Bhar Ke Liye" was used at the end of The Simpsons episode "Kiss Kiss, Bang Bangalore" (2006).
- A scene of the film is shown in the 2007 thriller Johnny Gaddaar, prompting a character to give Johnny as a fake name and hence the film title.

== Awards ==
18th Filmfare Awards:

Won

- Best Comedian – I. S. Johar
- Best Screenplay – Vijay Anand
- Best Editing – Vijay Anand

Nominated

- Best Female Playback Singer – Lata Mangeshkar for "Babul Pyaare"
