= Vidhaata =

- English-language Film poster
- Directed by: Subhash Ghai
- Written by: Sachin Bhowmick; Subhash Ghai; Kader Khan
- Produced by: Gulshan Rai
- Starring: Dilip Kumar; Shammi Kapoor; Sanjeev Kumar; Sanjay Dutt; Padmini Kolhapure; Madan Puri; Amrish Puri; Suresh Oberoi
- Cinematography: Kamalakar Rao
- Edited by: Waman Bhonsle; Gurudutt Shirali
- Music by: Kalyanji-Anandji
- Distributed by: Trimurti Films
- Release date: 3 December 1982
- Running time: 160 minutes
- Country: India
- Language: Hindi
- Box office: ₹16 crore

Vidhaata (transl. Creator) is a 1982 Indian Hindi-language action drama film directed by Subhash Ghai and produced by Gulshan Rai under his own production company Trimurti Films. It stars an ensemble cast of Dilip Kumar, Shammi Kapoor, Sanjeev Kumar, Sanjay Dutt, Padmini Kolhapure, Madan Puri, Amrish Puri, Suresh Oberoi, and Sarika in pivotal roles.

The film was remade in Kannada as Pithamaha, in Malayalam as Alakadalinakkare, and in Tamil as Vamsa Vilakku. Vidhaata was the highest-grossing Indian film of 1982 and the fifth highest-grossing Indian film of the decade, when adjusted for inflation, being declared a "Blockbuster" by Box office India.

== Synopsis ==
Shamsher Singh, his son Pratap Singh, and his daughter-in-law lead a happy life in an Indian village. Shamsher works as an engine driver with his friend Gurbaksh Singh. Pratap is appointed as the new inspector-in-charge of the village but is killed brutally by Jagawar Chaudhary, a notorious local smuggler, after Pratap refuses to help Jagawar in his illegal activities. Seeing his son dead, Shamsher Singh is enraged and kills some of Jagawar's goons whom he had seen throwing his son's dead body in the forest. When he is about to inquire from one of Jagawar's men about the person behind his son's murder, he is stopped by the police and is asked to surrender; Shamsher somehow manages to escape. His daughter-in-law dies while giving birth to Kunal Singh.

Shamsher takes his grandson Kunal and leaves his village to hide from the police. In the hope of making quick money and to secure his grandson's future, Shamsher starts working for Sir Mizya, a powerful underworld don, and takes on a new identity as Sir Shobraj. Over time, he becomes a wealthy and powerful smuggler and the chairman of the Mizya Group.

Meanwhile, Kunal grows up under the strict supervision of Shamsher's loyal employee Abu Baba. He falls in love with Durga, a beautiful slum girl and the daughter of one of Shamsher's old employees Ganpat. However, things take an ugly turn when Shamsher Singh disagrees to let Kunal marry Durga because of her being from a poor background; he instead warns Durga's mother to leave the city with her daughter or else faces serious consequences.

Although Durga is unwilling to leave at first, she later agrees to sacrifice her love and leaves with her mother on a ship to Goa, where Shamsher's men try to rape her. Abu Baba comes to their rescue and saves them but is killed by Shamsher's men with the help of Jagawar, who has become a powerful smuggler in Goa. Kunal is devastated after seeing Abu Baba's dead body and promises to take revenge. His investigations into Abu Baba's death eventually lead to the true identity of his grandfather and his father's killers.

Jagawar dethrones Shamsher and takes over as the chairman of Mizya Group. He kidnaps Kunal and Durga and imprisons them. Shamsher, reunited with his old friend Gurbaksh, storms into Jagawar's house. They kill all his men and rescue Kunal and Durga. A fight ensues between Shamsher and Jagawar, in which Jagawar is killed. However, Shamsher is mortally wounded and dies in the arms of Kunal and Gurbaksh. The film ends with Gurbaksh blessing the newly-wed couple.

== Cast ==
- Dilip Kumar as Shamsher Singh / Shobhraj
- Shammi Kapoor as Gurbaksh Singh
- Sanjeev Kumar as Abu Baba
- Sanjay Dutt as Kunal Singh
- Padmini Kolhapure as Durga
- Madan Puri as Khushaal Singh / K.K.
- Amrish Puri as Jagawar Chaudhary
- Suresh Oberoi as Inspector Pratap Singh
- Shreeram Lagoo as Sir Miziya
- Sarika as Neelima
- Madhu Malhotra as Lily
- Sudhir as Ballu
- Tom Alter as David
- Krishan Dhawan as Ganpat
- Sudha Shivpuri as Mrs. Ganpat
- Jagdeep as Peter John D'Costa
- Paintal as Muthuswamy
- Birbal as Bheema
- Mukri as Dance Organizer

== Awards and nominations ==
Awards	Category	Nominee	Result
30th Filmfare Awards	Best Film	Gulshan Rai	Nominated
30th Filmfare Awards	Best Director	Subhash Ghai	Nominated
30th Filmfare Awards	Best Supporting Actor	Sanjeev Kumar	Nominated
30th Filmfare Awards	Best Supporting Actor	Shammi Kapoor	Won

== Soundtrack ==
All songs are composed by Kalyanji-Anandji. All lyrics were written by Anand Bakshi.

Song	Singer
"Saat Saheliyan Khadi Khadi Fariyad Sunayen Ghadi Ghadi"	Kishore Kumar, Hemlata, Kanchan, Padmini Kolhapure, Shivangi Kolhapure, Anuradha Paudwal, Sadhana Sargam, Alka Yagnik
"Hathon Ki Chand Lakeeron Ka"	Anwar, Suresh Wadkar
"O Saathi Aa"	Lata Mangeshkar
"Udi Baba"	Asha Bhosle
"Pyar Ka Imtihan"	Asha Bhosle
