= Aa Te Kevi Dunniya =

- Theatrical release poster
- Directed by: Tejas Padiaa
- Written by: Tejas Padiaa
- Produced by: Vijay Khatri
- Starring: Raj Jatania; Yatin Parmar; Kinjal Pandya; Sunil Vishrani; Jayesh More; Krishna Pandya Rawal; RajKumar Kanojia; Falguni Desai; Padmesh Pandit; Sanat Vyas
- Music by: Viju Shah
- Release date: 9 January 2015
- Country: India

Aa Te Kevi Dunniya is a 2015 comedy film, written and directed by Tejas Padiaa and produced by Vijay Khatri. The film stars Raj Jatania, Yatin Parmar, Kinjal Pandya and others. The film showcases a world in which karma, and not money, is considered currency. The film was released on 9 January 2015.

== Cast ==
- Raj Jatania as Akash
- Yatin Parmar as Sameer
- Kinjal Pandya as Anjali
- Rajkumar Kanojia as Bhiku Bhikari
- Falguni Desai as Parsi Aunty
- Sanat Vyas as Gordhandas
- Sunil Visrani as Jagga
- Padmesh Pandit as Manj Baba

== Production ==
=== Development ===
The film was produced by Vijay Khatri and written and directed by Tejas Padiaa. Well known Bollywood music director Viju Shah has given the music and background score. While Bollywood singer Nakash Aziz, the crooner of chartbusters, has sung two songs in the film. The film tries to explore a world without money, where karma is currency.

=== Filming ===
The shooting of the film started in early 2014. It took place in some parts of Ahmedabad including famous Kankaria lake, Polo Forest - Vijay Nagar in Gujarat, India to name a few.

=== Casting ===
Aa Te Kevi Dunniya stars Raj Jatania, Yatin Parmar, Kinjal Pandya, Sunil Vishrani, Jayesh More, Krishna Pandya Rawal, RajKumar Kanojia, Falguni Desai, Padmesh Pandit and Sanat Vyas.

== Reception ==
The film received positive reviews on the release. Divya Bhaskar rated it 3/5 and called it a fun film. The Times of India rated it 3.5/5 and said the film "will not leave you disappointed." Bollywood filmmaker Satish Kaushik praised the film calling it "positive, bright and a scaling thought."
