= Shabbir Boxwala =

Indian film director

- Born: Mumbai, Maharashtra, India
- Occupations: Film producer; screenwriter
- Years active: 1989-present
- Spouse: Khadija Boxwala
- Children: Iram Boxwala; Ishaan Boxwala

Shabbir Boxwala is an Indian film producer and screenwriter who works in Hindi films.

== Filmography ==
| Year | Film | Screenwriter | Producer | Notes |
|---|---|---|---|---|
| 1989 | Tridev | Yes | No | |
| 1994 | Mohra | Yes | No | |
| 1997 | Gupt: The Hidden Truth | Yes | No | |
| 2003 | Dil Ka Rishta | Yes | No | |
| 2005 | Home Delivery | No | Yes | |
| 2006 | Yun Hota Toh Kya Hota | No | Yes | |
| 2008 | Mission Istanbul | No | Yes | |
| 2008 | EMI | No | Yes | |
| 2011 | Loot | No | Yes | |
| 2017 | Ishq Forever | Yes | No | |
| 2021 | Shershaah | No | Yes | |
| TBA | Awasthi vs Awasthi | No | Yes | |
