= Humse Badhkar Kaun =

- Directed by: Deepak Anand
- Written by: Raju Saigal
- Produced by: Shyam Bajaj
- Starring: Sunil Shetty; Saif Ali Khan; Sonali Bendre; Dipti Bhatnagar
- Cinematography: S. Pappu
- Edited by: Prashant Khedekar; Vinod Nayak
- Music by: Viju Shah
- Production company: Vee Creations
- Release date: 12 June 1998
- Running time: 147 minutes
- Country: India
- Language: Hindi

Humse Badhkar Kaun is a 1998 Indian Hindi-language action film directed by Deepak Anand and produced by Shyam Bajaj. It stars Sunil Shetty, Saif Ali Khan, Sonali Bendre and Deepti Bhatnagar in pivotal roles. It's a remake of the 1988 American movie Twins.

== Plot ==
Bhola, a villager, comes to city to meet his brother Sunny, a con-man, a Roadside Romeo, a car dealer, a thief all rolled into one. The brothers meet Sunny, who exploits Bhola and uses his strength and innocence to his benefit, but ultimately he succumbs to Bhola's innocence. Sunny has a girlfriend. Sunny, Bhola, Anu and Venee set off on a romantic journey, where love blossoms between the four. To their surprise, the brothers discover that their mother is Gayatri Devi, who is no other than the Chief Minister of the state. Gayatri Devi's aide Sudharshan Sinha is her advisor. Raza, along with Jabbar and terrorist leader Aakal are her biggest enemies, because she refuses to free Aakal's brothers, who are in police custody for criminal activities. Bhola and Sunny have to fight them to reach their mother and free the state from the terrorists.

== Cast ==
- Sunil Shetty as Bhola / Suraj
- Saif Ali Khan as Sunny
- Sonali Bendre as Anu
- Deepti Bhatnagar as Venee
- Raza Murad as Sudarshan Sinha
- Beena Banerjee as Chief Minister Gayetri Devi
- Mushtaq Khan as Sir John
- Mukesh Rishi as Akal
- Mohan Joshi as Jabbar

== Soundtrack ==
Humse Badhkar Kaun

Soundtrack album by Viju Shah
- Released: 1998
- Genre: Feature film soundtrack
- Label: Venus Records & Tapes

#	Title	Singer(s)	Music	Lyrics
1	"Line Maarle"	Udit Narayan	Viju Shah	Faaiz Anwar
2	"Teri Zulfo"	Udit Narayan, Sadhana Sargam	Viju Shah	Faaiz Anwar
3	"Suite Boot"	Udit Narayan, Vinod Rathod, Kavita Krishnamurthy	Viju Shah	Faaiz Anwar
4	"Huf Haza"	Vinod Rathod, Sapna Mukherjee	Viju Shah	Faaiz Anwar
5	"Chhat Mangni"	Abhijeet, Udit Narayan, Kavita Krishnamurthy	Viju Shah	Faaiz Anwar
