= Filmfare Award for Best Background Score =

Annual award for Hindi films

- Awarded for: Best Performance by a Background Scorer
- Country: India
- Presented by: Filmfare
- First award: Viju Shah, Gupt (1998)
- Currently held by: Ram Sampath, Laapataa Ladies (2025)
- Website: Filmfare Awards

The Filmfare Best Background Score is given by the Filmfare magazine as part of its annual Filmfare Awards for Hindi films.

Although the awards started in 1954, the Best Background Score category was introduced in 1998.

== Multiple wins ==
Wins	Composer
4	A. R. Rahman
3	Amit Trivedi
2	Sandeep Chowta, Ranjit Barot, Pritam

== Awards ==
Here is a list of the award winners and the films for which they won.

Year	Winner	Film
2025	Ram Sampath	Laapataa Ladies
2024	Harshavardhan Rameshwar	Animal
2023	Sanchit Balhara and Ankit Balhara	Gangubai Kathiawadi
2022	Shantanu Moitra	Sardar Udham
2021	Mangesh Dhakde	Thappad
2020	Karsh Kale & The Salvage Audio Collective	Gully Boy
2019	Daniel B. George	Andhadhun
2018	Pritam	Jagga Jasoos
2017	Sameer Uddin	Kapoor & Sons
2016	Anupam Roy	Piku
2015	Amit Trivedi	Queen
2014	Hitesh Sonik	Kai Po Che!
2013	Pritam	Barfi!
2012	Ranjit Barot	Shaitan
2011	Amit Trivedi	Udaan
2010	Amit Trivedi	Dev.D
2009	A. R. Rahman	Jodhaa Akbar
2008	A. R. Rahman	Guru
2007	Salim–Sulaiman	Krrish
2006	Monty Sharma	Black
2005	A. R. Rahman	Swades
2004	Wayne Sharpe	Gangaajal
2003	A. R. Rahman	The Legend of Bhagat Singh
2002	Ranjit Barot	Aks
2001	Sandeep Chowta	Jungle
2000	Anjan Biswas	Hum Dil De Chuke Sanam
1999	Sandeep Chowta	Satya
1998	Viju Shah	Gupt

== See also ==
- Filmfare Award
- Bollywood
- Cinema of India
