= Trishul (film) =

1978 Indian film directed by Yash Chopra

- English-language Film poster
- Directed by: Yash Chopra
- Written by: Salim–Javed
- Produced by: Gulshan Rai
- Starring: Shashi Kapoor; Sanjeev Kumar; Amitabh Bachchan; Hema Malini; Raakhee Gulzar; Poonam Dhillon; Sachin Pilgaonkar; Prem Chopra
- Cinematography: Kay Gee
- Edited by: B. Mangeshkar
- Music by: Mohammed Zahur Khayyam
- Production company: Trimurti Films
- Distributed by: Trimurti Films
- Release date: 5 May 1978
- Running time: 168 mins
- Country: India
- Language: Hindi

Trishul (IAST Hindustani: triśūl, transl. 'Trident') is a 1978 Indian Hindi-language action drama film, directed by Yash Chopra, written by Salim–Javed and produced by Gulshan Rai. It features music by Mohammed Zahur Khayyam, with lyrics by Sahir Ludhianvi. The film features an ensemble cast of Shashi Kapoor, Sanjeev Kumar, Amitabh Bachchan, Hema Malini, Raakhee Gulzar, Poonam Dhillon, Prem Chopra, and Sachin, with Waheeda Rehman in a special appearance.

Kapoor, Bachchan, Raakhee and Rehman had earlier starred together in Chopra's previous release, Kabhi Kabhie, two years prior.

Trishul was the second-highest grossing Indian film of 1978, after Muqaddar Ka Sikandar, which also starred Bachchan and Raakhee. The movie has been remade in Tamil as Mr. Bharath and in Telugu as Mr. Bharath.

Rishi Kapoor was offered the role of Ravi, which was eventually played by Sachin. Kapoor declined the offer, triggering animosity between him and Salim-Javed.

== Plot ==
In 1953, Raj Kumar Gupta (Sanjeev Kumar) abandons his girlfriend, Shanti (Waheeda Rehman), to marry a wealthy heiress, Kamini (Gita Siddharth), whose father, Seth Dindayal, makes him an equal partner in his business. After Gupta's marriage, Shanti visits him to congratulate him, with the news that she is pregnant with his child. She refuses Gupta's offer of help, realising that he is only doing so to assuage his guilty conscience, and leaves the city. Shanti gives birth to a baby boy named Vijay and raises him as a single mother.

25 years later, in 1978, Shanti passes away and the adult Vijay (Amitabh Bachchan) arrives in Delhi to seek revenge by ruining his father's business and family connections. At the same time, Gupta and Kamini's son, Shekhar (Shashi Kapoor) returns from abroad to take his place in his father's company. Shekhar and his younger sister, Kusum (Poonam Dhillon), who are Vijay's half-siblings, are caught in the crossfire of Vijay's revenge. Vijay crosses paths with Geeta (Raakhee), the devoted secretary to Gupta. He tries to bribe Geeta to receive details of Gupta's tender bids, but she refuses to accept it. Nevertheless, the two start to get closer to each other. Vijay bribes a different employee of Gupta, Bhandari (Yunus Parvez), and receives the information that he could not from Geeta. Bhandari's betrayal nets Vijay's company, Shanti Constructions, a lot of profits and results in losses for Gupta's company. On seeing Vijay and Geeta together one day, Gupta assumes that Geeta has sold him out and fires her. When Vijay learns about this, he exposes Bhandari as the real culprit to Gupta and Shekhar only to clear Geeta's name and hires her to work at his own company.

Vijay becomes a successful businessman quickly and is soon celebrating the second anniversary of Shanti Constructions with a huge party. He tells Geeta to invite the crème de la crème of the city, especially Gupta. At the party, Vijay meets Sheetal Verma (Hema Malini), the daughter and general manager of P. L. Verma (Iftekhar), who is also Shekhar's girlfriend. He tries to create differences between Shekhar and Sheetal. Soon, a fierce rivalry begins between Vijay and Gupta, in which both are willing to sacrifice their wealth and integrity. Vijay even encourages Kusum to marry her lover, Ravi (Sachin Pilgaonkar), against her father's wishes. As a result, a furious Shekhar has a fight with Vijay, but Geeta intervenes and reveals to Shekhar that Vijay is his brother. Shekhar and Kusum both leave their father's house in shame. Shekhar asks Vijay to give Kusum away at her marriage as her oldest brother, causing an enraged Gupta to hire Balwant Rai (Prem Chopra) to kill Vijay.

Meanwhile, Vijay visits Gupta to claim victory and confronts him over the injustice caused to his mother, revealing that Shanti has died and that he is his and Shanti's illegitimate son. A shocked Gupta tries to rescind the order that he has given Balwant, but Balwant and his henchmen have already kidnapped Ravi in order to reach out to Vijay. With the assistance of Shekhar and Gupta, Vijay successfully rescues Ravi. During the confrontation, Balwant attempts to shoot Vijay, but Gupta intervenes and takes the bullet for his son, before the police arrive at the scene and arrest Balwant and his henchmen. With his dying breath, Gupta pleads for forgiveness from Vijay, who forgives him and unites with the Gupta family. In addition, Vijay and Shekhar change the name of Vijay's company from Shanti Constructions to Shanti-Raj Constructions.

== Cast ==
- Shashi Kapoor as Shekhar Kumar Gupta
- Sanjeev Kumar as Raj Kumar "RK" Gupta
- Amitabh Bachchan as Vijay Kumar Gupta
- Hema Malini as Sheetal Verma
- Raakhee Gulzar as Geeta
- Poonam Dhillon as Kusum "Babli" Gupta
- Sachin Pilgaonkar as Ravi
- Waheeda Rehman as Shanti (Special Appearance)
- Prem Chopra as Balwant Rai
- Iftekhar as P. L. Verma
- Gita Siddharth as Kamini Gupta
- Manmohan Krishna as Seth Dindayal
- Yunus Parvez as Bhandari
- Mohan Sherry as Gangu
- M. B. Shetty as Madhav Singh
- Manik Irani as Gangu's Henchman
- Moolchand as Creditor
- Sudha Chopra as Raj's Mother

== Soundtrack ==
All the songs were composed by Khayyam and lyrics were penned by Sahir Ludhianvi. Vocals are supplied by Lata Mangeshkar, Kishore Kumar (singing for Kapoor), Yesudas (singing for Kumar and Bachchan), Nitin Mukesh (singing for Sachin) and Pamela Chopra.

#	Title	Singer(s)	Duration
1	"Ja Ri Behna Ja"	Kishore Kumar, Yesudas & Pamela Chopra	03:05
2	"Jo Ho Yaar Apna"	Kishore Kumar, Lata Mangeshkar	03:29
3	"Mohabbat Bade Kaam Ki Cheez Hai"	Kishore Kumar, Lata Mangeshkar & Yesudas	04:38
4	"Janeman Tum Kamal Karte Ho"	Kishore Kumar, Lata Mangeshkar	05:37
5	"Gapoochi Gapoochi Gam Gam"	Lata Mangeshkar, Nitin Mukesh	04:09
6	"Aap Ki Maheki Hui Zulf Ko"	Lata Mangeshkar, Yesudas	03:09
7	"Tu Mere Saath Rahega"	Lata Mangeshkar	06:29

== Reception ==
=== Box office ===
In India, the film grossed ₹110 million ($13.4 million), with net earnings of ₹55 million. It was declared a 'super hit' at the box office, becoming the second-highest grossing Indian film of 1978, below Muqaddar Ka Sikandar and above Don, both also starring Bachchan.

Overseas in the Soviet Union, the film released in May 1980, with 529 prints. It sold 29.7 million tickets at the Soviet box office, grossing an estimated 7.43 million Rbls ($11.7 million, or ₹92 million), bringing the film's worldwide gross to approximately ₹202 million ($25.1 million).

Adjusted for inflation, its Indian gross is equivalent to $66.1 million (₹4.9 billion) and its Soviet gross is equivalent to $45.7 million (₹3.39 billion), for a total inflation-adjusted worldwide gross of $111.8 million (₹8.28 billion).

In terms of footfalls, the film sold an estimated 43 million tickets in India, and 29.7 million tickets in the Soviet Union, for an estimated total of 72.7 million tickets sold worldwide.

=== Awards and nominations ===
26th Filmfare Awards:

Nominations

- Best Film – Gulshan Rai
- Best Director – Yash Chopra
- Best Actor – Amitabh Bachchan
- Best Supporting Actor – Sanjeev Kumar
- Best Story – Salim–Javed

== Legacy ==
Ziya Us Salam of The Hindu in his review of Yeh Hai Jalwa (2002) called it "a spoof of Trishul".

=== Popular culture ===
The film was heavily referenced in Anurag Kashyap's 2012 crime film Gangs of Wasseypur. A Sinhala film with a similar story line was made with the title Hello Shyama by Director M.S. Anandan, starring Gamini Fonseka in the role of Sanjeev, and Shyama Anandan, daughter of M.S. Anandan, in the role played by Amitabh Bachchan.
