= Asambhav =

2004 Indian film by Rajiv Rai

- Poster
- Directed by: Rajiv Rai
- Written by: Rajiv Rai; Naeem Sha
- Produced by: Gulshan Rai
- Starring: Arjun Rampal; Priyanka Chopra; Naseeruddin Shah
- Cinematography: Sukumar Jatania
- Edited by: Rajiv Rai; Taranjeet Singh
- Music by: Viju Shah
- Production company: Trimurti Films
- Distributed by: Shree Ashtavinayak Cine Vision
- Release date: 23 July 2004
- Running time: 149 minutes
- Country: India
- Language: Hindi
- Budget: ₹13 crore
- Box office: ₹5.16 crore

Asambhav (transl. The Impossible) is a 2004 Indian Hindi-language action thriller film directed by Rajiv Rai and produced by Gulshan Rai under the Trimurti Films banner. It stars Arjun Rampal, Naseeruddin Shah and Priyanka Chopra, along with Dipannita Sharma, Tom Alter, Milind Gunaji, and Sharat Saxena. The film was shot entirely in Switzerland.

The film was released on 23 July 2004 and was a box-office failure, earning ₹5.16 crore worldwide against a budget of ₹13 crore.

== Plot ==
Captain Aditya "Adit" Arya is a special agent of the Indian Army. The Indian president Veer Pratap Singh is kidnapped by Rafiq Mabroz in exchange for cash rewarded by renowned terrorists Youssan Baksh and General Ansari. Adit is sent undercover to rescue the president and his daughter, Kinjal.

The mission is coded "Asambhav." Adit poses as a journalist for Indiatimes and makes his way to Switzerland with the help of a RAW agent called Atul Bhatnagar. On the flight, Adit meets Alisha. Alisha is a singer and has come to Switzerland to do a show with Sam Hans. Her friend Shilpa accompanies her. However, the people whom Alisha and Shilpa have come to Switzerland with are drug smugglers. Shilpa is murdered when she finds this out, and Alisha pretends she knows nothing but meets Adit for help. Adit and Alisha fall in love.

Adit links events from Shilpa's murder to the president's kidnapping and sees that Sam Hans, General Ansari, Youssan Baksh, and Rafiq Mabroz are involved together. Hans' friend Ranjit Parmar, of the Indian embassy, checks files of Switzerland and learns Rafiq Mabroz is a terrorist. He informs Hans, and Hans decides to fight ISI. However, he signs a deal with ISI by kidnapping the president from Youssan Baksh and returning the president to Baksh in exchange for an offer of 50 million pounds.

Parmar suspects someone at the Indian embassy is a traitor helping terrorists. He finds out that Ms. Brar is a traitor. He informs Ambassador G.L. Sarin and is knocked out by Mabroz. Parmar awakes to discover that Ms. Brar and Sarin are both traitors and associates of Mabroz. Mabroz kills Parmar, and Sarin leaves a suicide note beside Parmar. Capt. Arya and Bhatnagar find Parmar dead by the note, but Arya reveals that the ambassador is the traitor because of his head stamp on the suicide note. Arya tries to finish Sarin, but Brar calls the police to get Arya and the ambassadors arrested. Arya shows the police his army card while Sarin and Brar flee. Arya chases them, and Gazi tries to attack Arya. Arya runs after Gazi and is attacked by ISI agents and Youssan's men in a fort. They try to kill Arya, but Arya fires back and kills all of them, including Gazi.

Adit reaches Youssan's headquarters to free the president. He kills General Ansari and all of Youssan's men. Youssan takes the president and flees. Adit chases him. Sam has captured Alisha and Kinjal but is stopped by Ambassador Sarin, who has Hans' friend Brian as a captive. Hans gives money to free Brian, but Sarin kills Brian. Hans kills Mabroz's men. Ms. Brar and Volga chase Alisha and Kinjal near a helicopter but kill each other in the crossfire. Sarin tries to finish Hans, but Hans kills him to avenge the death of Brian.

Youssan tries to kill the president, but Adit kills Youssan and saves him. Mabroz tries to shoot Adit, but Adit kills him. In the end, Adit meets Sam, who confesses sins he committed but promises to improve; so they become friends after being arch-rivals throughout the Mission Asambhav. Adit goes back to India with his girlfriend Alisha, Kinjal, the president, and Atul Bhatnagar.

== Cast ==
- Arjun Rampal as Captain Aadit Arya
- Priyanka Chopra as Alisha
- Naseeruddin Shah as Sameer "Sam" Hans
- Dipannita Sharma as Kinjal, the President's daughter
- Mohan Agashe as President Veer Pratap Singh
- Yashpal Sharma as Ranjit Parmar
- Sharat Saxena as G. L. Sarin
- Mukesh Rishi as Youssan Baksh
- Shawar Ali as Rafiq Mabroz
- Milind Gunaji as General Ansari, an ISI agent
- Tej Sapru as Hashmi
- Chetan Hansraj as Gazi
- Tom Alter as Brian
- Jameel Khan as Atul Bhatnagar
- Arif Zakaria as Dabral
- Tora Khasgir as Ms. Tanya Brar
- Chitrita Sharma as Shilpa
- Anupama Verma as Volga
- Mumaith Khan as a dancer in the song "Mashuqa Rubiya" (special appearance)

== Production ==
=== Development ===
In 2001, Rai planned to shift to the action thriller genre after the failure of his romance film Pyaar Ishq Aur Mohabbat. In an interview with Filmfare Online, Rai said, "I listened to several people's opinions. I made the film ('PIAM') not on intuition and belief but on marketing strategies and counsels from trade persons insisting that love stories were the trend of the day." Rai started his new project with a comeback to action genre and titled it Asambhav.

=== Casting ===
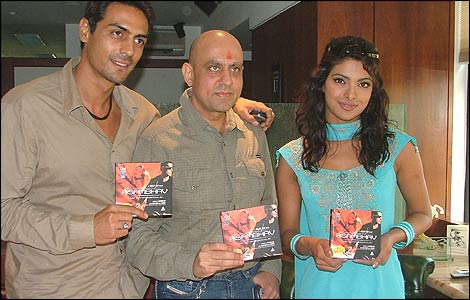
Arjun Rampal, Rajiv Rai and Priyanka Chopra at Asambhav music launch (left to right)

Rai initially planned Asambhav as a three-hero film. Arjun Rampal, who made his acting debut with Rai's previous directorial venture Pyaar Ishq Aur Mohabbat, was initially signed as the first male lead. Anil Kapoor and Sunil Shetty were also rumored to be attached to the project but Rai eventually changed the script, making it a solo hero film with Rampal as the protagonist of the movie. Aishwarya Rai was signed as the heroine. Rampal and Rai had acted in Dil Ka Rishta that released on 17 January 2003 and Asambhav marked their second pairing. However, Rai backed out in 2003, and Priyanka Chopra was cast in as the female lead.

Naseeruddin Shah was recruited to essay the role of the villain as he had worked with Rai as a hero in Tridev and as a villain in Mohra. Shah had earned critical acclaim for his villainous performance in Rai's Mohra and had earned a nomination for Filmfare Award for Best Performance in a Negative Role at the 40th Filmfare Awards. Noticing on Shah's previous success in a negative role, Rai cast him as the villain in his latest action thriller. The total cast was of 55 artists including model turned actress Dipannita Sharma, Tom Alter and Sharat Saxena among others.

During the music launch, Rajiv Rai was interviewed on casting models in important roles. He said, "I wanted a very western look to the film; I wanted it to look stylish. I have roped in many models because I wanted my film to look fresh and stylish. Models have a lot of exposure, and they are very confident in front of the camera. There are a lot of fresh faces coming into acting. I wanted fresh faces for my film. The modeling industry can act. It's not fair to pinpoint. Arjun (Rampal) himself was a model."

=== Filming ===
After the casting was finalised, Rajiv Rai flew to Switzerland, and the film was shot in Ticino. He began filming in June 2003 with a schedule of 57 days. It was filmed in a multi-camera setup. While most scenes were shot with four cameras, the action sequences consisted of seven camera units. It was the first Indian action film to feature no stunts. The action sequences were digitally shot. Asambhav was the first Indian film to be graded digitally on Luster. Filming was completed in September 2003. It was the first Indian movie to be shot in that location, in the longest filming schedule of any Indian film unit in Switzerland. Asambhav was digitised, and no duplicates were used in its development.

=== Post-production ===
Asambhav was launched in March 2004. The soundtrack was composed by Viju Shah and it was launched in Mumbai on 26 May 2004.

== Release ==
Asambhav was released on 23 July 2004. First 15 minutes of the film aired on Star Gold a day prior to film's release.

== Reception ==
=== Critical response ===
Asambhav received mixed to positive reviews from critics upon release. Ronjita Kulkarni of Rediff wrote, "Asambhav, starring Arjun Rampal and Priyanka Chopra, is a good film. It packs in the done-to-death Pak-bashing content, and reduces Pakistanis and Afghans to caricatures." Taran Adarsh of Bollywood Hungama gave a rating of 1 out of 5 stars and wrote, "On the whole, ASAMBHAV is a weak film in all respects. At the box-office, its chances of hit movie asambhav [impossible]."

Subhash K. Jha of IANS wrote "Asambhav is arguably the only mainstream film ever with no mother-figure on the hectic horizon. But the absence of melodrama cannot in itself be a virtue unless it is compounded by a moist quality in the overall design of storytelling."

=== Box office ===
==== India ====
It collected ₹80,632,076 rupees in the opening weekend from all over the country. The earning in the following week was it ₹100,507,694 in the second week and ₹220,731,569 in the third week. It grossed a total of ₹500,113,339. Rediff.com called it an "average grosser".

==== International ====
The film collected US$19,504 in the United States. In the United Kingdom, the film hit fifteen screens in the first weekend of 23 July and collected £16,894. In the second weekend of 30 July, the screens were reduced to fourteen. Asambhav collected £2,142 and grossed a total of £30,311 in the first two weekends.

== Soundtrack ==
Asambhav

Soundtrack album by Viju Shah
- Released: 22 May 2004
- Recorded: 2003
- Genre: Feature film soundtrack
- Label: Tips
- Director: Rajiv Rai
- Producer: Gulshan Rai

The soundtrack of Asambhav was recorded in 2003. It was composed by Viju Shah. It was released by the Tips Music Films label on 22 May 2004. The lyrics were written by Sameer, and Remo D'Souza was the choreographer of the music sequences. The soundtrack was released on 22 May 2004.

The soundtrack consisted of eleven tracks, including five songs, five instrumental versions and a special 'Asambhav Theme'. The director Rajiv Rai and the supporting actor Naseeruddin Shah also sang in the movie. They performed the song 'Raatein Badi Hain'.

Asambhav: Track listing
No.	Title	Singer(s)	Length
1.	"Raatein Badi Hain"	Hema Sardesai, Naseeruddin Shah, Rajiv Rai & Nayan Rathod	6:18
2.	"Teri Dekh Dekh Ladkaiyan"	Udit Narayan & Kavita Krishnamurthy	6:08
3.	"Mashuqa Rubi"	Anuradha Sriram	7:26
4.	"Main Sada Hoon"	KK	7:44
5.	"Koi Aayega"	Sunidhi Chauhan	6:15
6.	"Asambhav Theme"	Instrumental	7:02
7.	"Raatein Badi Hain (Instrumental)"		6:18
8.	"Teri Dekh Dekh Ladkaiyan (Instrumental)"		4:49
9.	"Mashuqa Rubi (Instrumental)"		7:12
10.	"Main Sada Hoon (Instrumental)"		7:46
11.	"Koi Aayega (Instrumental)"		6:12

== Awards and nominations ==
- Zee Cine Awards
  - Zee Cine Award for Best Song Recording–Tanay Gajjar (nominated)
