= Muqaddar Ka Badshaah =

1990 Indian Hindi-language film

Muqaddar Ka Badshah
- Directed by: T. Rama Rao
- Written by: Iqbal Durrani
- Produced by: A. Poornachandra Rao
- Starring: Vinod Khanna; Shabana Azmi; Vijayshanti; Anupam Kher; Kader Khan
- Music by: Viju Shah
- Production company: Lakshmi Productions
- Release date: 1990
- Country: India
- Language: Hindi

Muqaddar Ka Badshah (transl. King of Destiny) is a 1990 Hindi-language film directed by T. Rama Rao. The film stars Vinod Khanna, Shabana Azmi, Vijayshanti, Anupam Kher, Kader Khan and Amrish Puri. Dialogues of this movie became very popular and therefore audio cassette of Dialogues were released it was written by Iqbal Durrani.

== Plot ==
He is a union leader, who was falsely accused of several crimes because his regular fight for the rights of the workers annoys his employer. He proves his innocence but faces with new problems when his sister falls in love.

== Cast ==
- Vinod Khanna ... Naresh
- Shabana Azmi ... Advocate Sharda Singh
- Vijayshanti ... Bharti Rathod
- Anupam Kher ... Adv Rana Vijay Singh
- Kader Khan ... Inspector Gulshan
- Amrish Puri ... Vikral Singh
- Navin Nischol ... DSP Vikram Singh Rathod
- Tej Sapru ... Manik Singh
- Asrani ... Inspector Officer
- Suparna Anand ... Geeta
- Guddi Maruti ... Mrs Gidwani
- Aasif Sheikh ... Ashok Singh
- Jaya Mathur as Anu Singh: Vijay and Sharada's daughter; Ashok's younger sister
- Ghanashyam Roheira ... Panditji
- Mohan Choti ... Panditji
- Rammohan Sharma
- Ghanashyam Nayak
- Master Antriksh

== Music ==
All lyrics are written by Sameer; all music is composed by Viju Shah.

No.	Title	Singer(s)	Length
1.	"Aiko Haina"	Amit Kumar and Sapna Mukherjee	5:00
2.	"Jaaneman"	Amit Kumar and Sadhana Sargam	5:10
3.	"Muqaddar Ka Badshah"	Amit Kumar	4:34
4.	"Shararat Karoonga"	Amit Kumar & Sapna Mukherjee	5:46
5.	"Ho Jaayega Loaccha"	Amit Kumar & Boney	7:05
6.	"Aiko Haina"	Amit Kumar	1:50
