= Dream Girl (1977 film) =

- Film poster
- Directed by: Pramod Chakravorty
- Produced by: Gulshan Rai
- Starring: Hema Malini; Ashok Kumar; Dharmendra; Prem Chopra
- Music by: Songs: Laxmikant–Pyarelal; Background Score: Robin Chatterjee; Vasant Mudliar
- Distributed by: Trimurti Films
- Release date: 14 January 1977; (India)
- Country: India
- Language: Hindi

Dream Girl is a 1977 Hindi film, directed by Pramod Chakravorty. The movie stars Hema Malini, Ashok Kumar, Dharmendra and Prem Chopra. According to film expert Rajesh Subramanian Hema Malini was promoted as the Dream Girl by producer B Ananthaswamy from her first film and that eventually led her to star in this film.

== Plot ==
The story revolves around a young woman (Hema Malini), who plays five different characters in the film – Sapna, Padma, Champabai, Dream girl, and Rajkumari, to steal money in order to maintain a home for orphans.

== Cast ==
- Ashok Kumar as Ashok Mehra
- Dharmendra as Anupam "Anup" Mehra
- Hema Malini as Sapna/Padma/Champabai/Dream girl/Rajkumari
- Asrani as Chanda Mama
- Prem Chopra as Prem Verma
- Lalita Pawar as Daima
- Dina Pathak as Ratnabai
- Komilla Wirk as Radha
- Alka (actor) as Roopa
- Pinchoo Kapoor as Boss
- S. N. Banerjee as Munimjee
- D. K. Sapru as Sindhi Groom's Dad
- Praveen Paul as Birbal
- Padmini Kolhapure as Padmini (orphan)
- Pallavi Joshi as Pallavi
- Alankar as Alankar
- Raju Shrestha as Raju (orphan)
- Ramesh Deo as Dr. Kapoor
- Seema Deo as Mrs. Kapoor

== Music ==
The music of this movie was composed by music director duo Laxmikant–Pyarelal and the lyrics were penned by Anand Bakshi.

The song "Dream Girl" sung by Kishore Kumar became an evergreen hit.

Track listing (Hindi)
| No. | Title | Singer(s) | Length |
|---|---|---|---|
| 1. | "Dream Girl" | Kishore Kumar | 6:00 |
| 2. | "Hua Kya Agar Tu Zara Bewafa" | Kishore Kumar | 5:39 |
| 3. | "O Raja Babu" | Lata Mangeshkar | 6:12 |
| 4. | "Chhupa Chhupi Khelen Aao (Sad)" | Lata Mangeshkar | 4:44 |
| 6. | "Chhupa Chhupi Khelen Aao" | Lata Mangeshkar | 4:43 |
| 8. | "Duniya Ke Log" | Asha Bhosle | 8:58 |
