= Sapna Mukherjee =

Indian singer

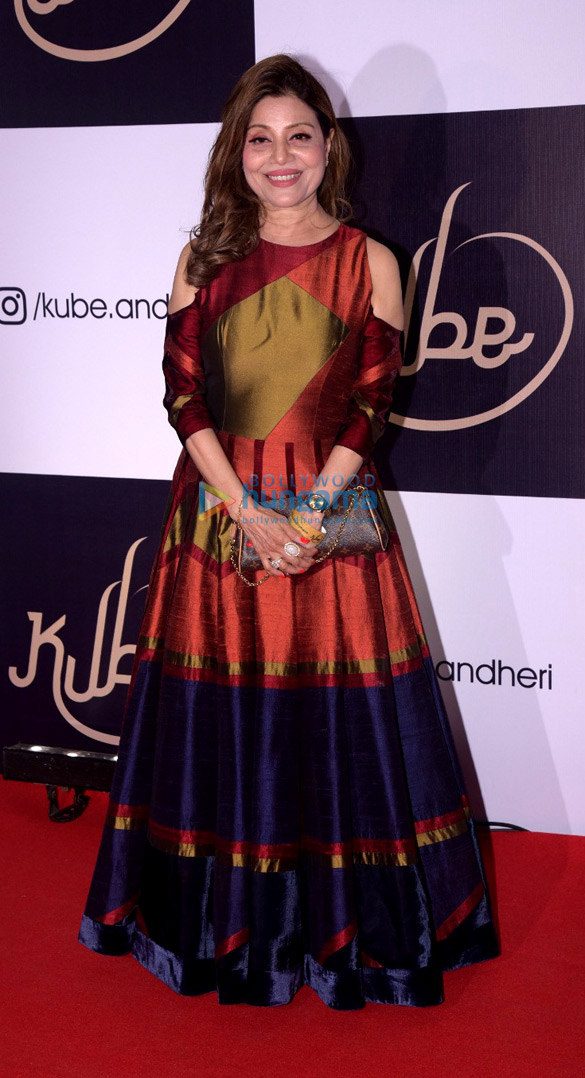
- Mukherjee at the launch of ‘KUBE’ in Mumbai in 2017

Background information
- Genre: playback singing
- Occupation: Singer
- Instrument: Vocals
- Years active: 1986–2009

Sapna Mukherjee is a Bollywood playback singer. In 1990, she won the Filmfare Award for Best Female Playback Singer for the song "Tirchi Topi Wale" from Tridev (1989).

== Career ==
She started her singing career in 1986 when music directors, Kalyanji Anandji gave her a chance to sing three songs for the movie Janbaaz,the song "Tera Saath hai Kitna Pyara" by Mukherjee and Kishore Kumar became a chartbuster. Her first breakthrough came in 1989 when Kalyanji Anandji chose her to sing "Tirchi Topi Wale" alongside Amit Kumar for the movie Tridev.The song became a massive hit.

Mukherjee has been featured on several soundtrack albums that were among best-selling albums of their respective years such as Yalgaar,Aankhen,Lootere,Aatish:Feel The Fire,Vishwatma,Khiladi, Yaarana,Ravan Raaj:A True Story and Raja Hindustani which is the 5th best-selling Hindi soundtrack of all time.

In 2006, she came back with an album titled "Mere Piya", which included several solo performances by herself as well as a duet together with singer Sonu Nigam.Lata Mangeshkar and Jaya Bachchan were present at the event. Sapna Mukherjee has done staging live concerts in US, Canada and the UK.

Mukherjee has worked with well-known music directors such as Nadeem-Shravan,Raamlaxman,Bappi Lahiri,Jatin–Lalit,Anand–Milind,Viju Shah,Laxmikant–Pyarelal,Rajesh Roshan,Kalyanji–Anandji,Anu Malik,A.R. Rahman and Channi Singh.

== Discography ==
List of songs recorded by Sapna Mukherjee

Year	Movie	Song(s)	Composer	Co-Singer(s)	Notes
1986	Janbaaz	"Tera Saath Hai Kitna Pyara"	Kalyanji Anandji	Kishore Kumar	Debut Film
1986	Janbaaz	"Jab Jab Teri Surat dekhu"	Kalyanji Anandji	Mahesh Gadhvi	
1986	Janbaaz	"Pyar Do Pyar Lo"	Kalyanji Anandji	Solo	
1988	Dariya Dil	"Patthar Kya Marte Ho"	Rajesh Roshan	Mohammed Aziz,Chorus	
1988	Dayavan	"Chahe Meri Jaan Tu Le Le"	Laxmikant Pyarelal	Jolly Mukherjee	
1988	Dayavan	"Diwani Tum Jawanon Ki"	Laxmikant Pyarelal	Jolly Mukherjee, Mohammed Aziz	
1988	Pyaar Mohabbat	"Ek Maa Ek Munna"	Laxmikant Pyarelal	Shabbir Kumar,Kavita Krishnamurthy	
1988	Pathar Ke Insan	"Chumma Do"	Bappi Lahiri	Bappi Lahiri	
1988	Halaal Ki Kamaai	"Poochho Na Poochho"	Bappi Lahiri	Shabbir Kumar,Gautam Ghosh	
1988	Hatya	"Main Pyar Ka Pujari"	Bappi Lahiri	Mohammed Aziz	
1988	Saazish	"Mere Sawaal Ka Tum Do Jawab"	Kalyanji Anandji	Suresh Wadkar	
1989	Apna Desh Paraye Log	"Haseena Nachegi"	Usha Khanna	Solo	
1989	Daata	"Naach Mere Lala"	Kalyanji Anandji	Solo	
1989	Daata	"Holi Khelein Nand Laal, Laal Khele Holi Kanha Ne Mari Aise Pichkari"	Kalyanji Anandji	Nalin Dave	
1989	Ghar Ka Chirag	"Yeh Kismat Hai Kya"	Bappi Lahiri	Amit Kumar,Mohammed Aziz	
1989	Ghar Ka Chirag	"Ae Kash Tum Kehdo Kabhi"	Bappi Lahiri	Udit Narayan	
1989	Gentleman	"Ba Bablu Ba Bablu, You Are My Girl Friend, Ma Malu"	Bappi Lahiri	Bappi Lahiri	
1989	Kahan Hai Kanoon	"Don't Call Me Baby"	Bappi Lahiri	Solo	
1989	Khoj	"Khoj Mein Kis Ki"	Bappi Lahiri	Solo	
1989	Nafrat Ki Aandhi	"Chahiye He Man"	Bappi Lahiri	Solo	
1989	Jaadugar	"Aaye Hain Duaen Dene"	Kalyanji Anandji	Jolly Mukherjee,Sadhana Sargam,Mohammed Aziz	
1989	Jaisi Karni Waisi Bharnii	"Aaja A Khelen Game Koi"	Rajesh Roshan	Kumar Sanu	
1989	Tridev	"Tirchi Topi Wale"	Kalyanji–Anandji, Viju Shah	Amit Kumar	Filmfare Award Winner - Best Female Playback Singer
1989	Tridev	"Gajar Ne Kiya Hai Ishara (Oye Oye)"	Kalyanji–Anandji, Viju Shah	Alka Yagnik, Sadhana Sargam	
1990	Mera Pati Sirf Mera Hai	"Thandi Hawaein"	Anand-Milind	Shailendra Singh	
1990	Muqaddar Ka Badshaah	"Aiko Haina"	Viju Shah	Amit Kumar	
1990	Muqaddar Ka Badshaah	"Shararat Karoonga"	Viju Shah	Amit Kumar	
1990	Kafan	"Zindagi Ka Kya Bharosa"	Anand-Milind	Solo	
1991	Fateh	"Tere Siwa Mere Siwa"	Naresh Sharma	Solo	
1991	Dharam Sankat	"Nathaniya Main Na Pehnoon"	Kalyanji Anandji	Solo	
1991	Trinetra	"Kehni Hain Ek Baat"	Anand-Milind	Behroze Chatterjee,Debashish Dasgupta	
1991	Karz Chukana Hai	"Tere Hathon Ne Chhua"	Rajesh Roshan	Amit Kumar,Govinda	
1991	Kurbaan	"Zuba Zuba"	Anand-Milind	Solo	
1991	Naya Zaher	"Jane Jigar Dekh Idhar"	Kalyanji Anandji	Sudesh Bhosale,Hema Sardesai,Sonali Bajpayee,Shikha Sen	
1991	Naya Zaher	"Kabhi Gyarah Baje"	Kalyanji Anandji	Sudesh Bhosale	
1991	Jungle Queen	"Ek Do Teen"	Anand-Milind	Abhijeet Bhatacharya	
1991	Jungle Queen	"Main Haan Haan Karti Hoon"	Anand-Milind	Abhijeet Bhatacharya	
1991	Ranbhoomi	"Ladka Jab Ladki Se Lipte"	Laxmikant Pyarelal	Amit Kumar	
1991	Rupaye Dus Karod	"Bandh Khidki Hai"	Bappi Lahiri	Chunky Panday	
1991	Numbri Aadmi	"Teri Gathri Me Laaga Chor"	Bappi Lahiri	Amit Kumar,Bappi Lahiri	
1991	Numbri Aadmi	"Aaj Nach Nach Ke"	Bappi Lahiri	Kavita Krishnamurthy,Anupama Deshpande	
1991	Swarg Jaisaa Ghar	"Zara Dekho Sajan"	Bappi Lahiri	Shabbir Kumar	
1991	Shikari	"Main Hoon Aflatoon"	Anu Malik	Sudesh Bhosale	
1991	Shikari	"Duniya O Duniya"	Anu Malik	Sudesh Bhosale	
1991	Love	"Aayi Bahar Khilte Huye Gul"	Anand-Milind	Solo	
1992	Tilak	"Katata Nahin Hai Din"	Anand-Milind	Udit Narayan	
1992	Honeymoon	"Ghanti Baje Gulfam"	Anand-Milind	Sudesh Bhosale	
1992	Police Officer	"Dil Mera Kehta Hain"	Anand-Milind	Abhijeet Bhattacharya, Udit Narayan, Sudesh Bhosle	
1992	Baaz	"Resham Jaisa Rang"	Anand-Milind	Solo	
1992	Jaagruti	"Na Na Na Aana"	Anand-Milind	Solo	
1992	Balwaan	"Dhin Tak, Dhin Tak"	Mahesh-Kishore	Abhijeet Bhattacharya	
1992	Jai Kaali	"Chandi Mangala Kaali"	Usha Khanna	Vinod Rathond,Aradhana	
1992	Vishwatma	"Dil Le Gayi Teri Bindiya"	Viju Shah	Amit Kumar, Mohammad Aziz, Udit Narayan	
1992	Vishwatma	"Toofan"	Viju Shah	Amit Kumar, Alka Yagnik, Sadhana Sargam, Boney	
1992	Khiladi	"Khud Ko Kya Samajhti Hai"	Jatin–Lalit	Abhijeet Bhattacharya, Udit Narayan, Kavita Krishnamurthy	
1992	Tyagi	"Tanha Dil Ghabrata Hai"	Bappi Lahiri	Kumar Sanu	
1992	Yalgaar	"Ho Jata Hai Kaise Pyar"	Channi Singh	Kumar Sanu	
1992	Yalgaar	"Aakhir Tumhe Aana Hai Jara Der"	Channi Singh	Udit Narayan	
1992	Yalgaar	"Dil Dil Dil"	Channi Singh	Channi Singh	
1993	King Uncle	"Parody Song"	Rajesh Roshan	Sudesh Bhosle	
1993	Aankhen	"Chaukhat Pe Tumhari Hum"	Bappi Lahiri	Kumar Sanu, Mohammad Aziz	
1993	Police Wala	"Ooh Aah Ooh"	Bappi Lahiri	Sudesh Bhosale	
1993	Lootere	"Oye Pape"	Anand–Milind	Sukhwinder Singh	
1993	Game	"Macho Man"	Anand–Milind	Solo	
1993	Kayda Kanoon	"Tadapne Do"	Anand–Milind	Solo	
1993	Kayda Kanoon	"Aap Aaye"	Anand–Milind	Vinod Rathod	
1993	Jeevan Ki Shatranj	"Ek Haseena Lakh Deewane"	Anand–Milind	Solo	
1993	Kaise Kaise Rishte	"Nazuk Hu Meri Kalai Ko"	Nadeem-Shravan	Solo	
1993	Pyar Pyar	"Operator Operator"	Nadeem-Shravan	Vinod Rathod	
1993	Bhagyawan	"Dil Dil Dil"	Anand-Milind	Amit Kumar	
1993	Mahakaal	"Janejaan Bahon Mein Aaja"	Anand-Milind	Solo	
1993	Meri Aan	"Ek Raat Mein"	Ravindra Jain	Solo	
1994	Krantiveer	"Love Rap"	Anand-Milind	Amit Kumar, Sudesh Bhosle, Poornima	
1994	Andaz Apna Apna	"Shola Shola Tu Bhadke"	Tushar Bhatia,Viju Shah	Behroze Chatterjee, Debashish Dasgupta,S.P Balasubramaniam	
1994	Anth	"Dil Mera Yaha Wahan"	Anand-Milind	Solo	
1994	Aatish: Feel the Fire	"Aa Aa Mere Dilruba"	Nadeem-Shravan	Kumar Sanu	
1994	Chhoti Bahoo	"O Laila"	Kalyanji Anandji	Kumar Sanu	
1994	Insaaf Apne Lahoo Se	"Ek Aur Do Idhar Dekho"	Laxmikant–Pyarelal	Amit Kumar	
1994	Gangster	"Baahon Mein Aake"	Jatin–Lalit	Sadhana Sargam,Vijayta Pandit	
1994	Jazbaat	"Lage Ladkiyo Ke Mamle Me"	Raamlaxman	Solo	
1994	Insaanyat	"Haule Haule- Part- 1"	Rajesh Roshan	Mohammad Aziz,Kumar Sanu,Sadhana Sargam	
1994	Insaanyat	"Haule Haule- Part- 2"	Rajesh Roshan	Sadhana Sargam	
1994	Kranti Kshetra	"Shor Machaongi"	Nadeem-Shravan	Babul Supriyo	
1994	Kranti Kshetra	"Jaaneman Yeh Geet Nahin"	Nadeem-Shravan	Kumar Sanu	
1994	Kranti Kshetra	"Deewane Hai Hum Tere"	Nadeem-Shravan	Vinod Rathod	
1994	Kranti Kshetra	"Malan Thara Baag Mein"	Nadeem-Shravan	Vinod Rathod, Babul Supriyo, Sapna Awasthi, Suryakant	
1995	Andolan	"Nazar Mein Tu, Jigar Mein Tu"	Nadeem-Shravan	Kumar Sanu	
1995	Andolan	"Maza Karle Meri Jaan"	Nadeem-Shravan	Bali Brahmbhatt	
1995	Hum Sub Chor Hain	"Tere Mere Pyar Ka"	Bappi Lahiri	Kavita Krishnamurthy	
1995	Maidan-E-Jung	"Kahi Pyaasi Raat"	Bappi Lahiri	Amit Kumar	
1995	Ravan Raaj: A True Story	"Tu Cheez Badi Hai Sakht Sakht"	Viju Shah	Bali Brahmabhatt, Johny Lever	
1995	Zamaana Deewana	"Zamaana Deewana Ho Gaya"	Nadeem-Shravan	Vinod Rathod, Alka Yagnik	
1995	Gaddar	"Sun To Zara"	Nadeem-Shravan	Kumar Sanu, Bali Brambhatt	
1995	Yaarana	"Jaadu Jaadu"	Anu Malik	Udit Narayan	
1995	Takkar	"My Name is Laila"	Anu Malik	Anu Malik	
1995	Jallad	"Aankhon Mein Kya Hain"	Anand–Milind	Vinod Rathod	
1995	Zakhmi Sipahi	"Lips To Lips"	Rais Bhartiya	Abhijeet	
1995	Zakhmi Sipahi	"O Laila O Laila"	Rais Bhartiya	Shabbir Kumar,Ila Arun	
1996	Agni Prem	"Madam Madam Bolo"	Bappi Lahiri	Sudesh Bhosale	
1996	Apne Dam Par	"Dil Deewana Sanam, Aa Lag Jaa Gale"	Aadesh Shrivastava	Udit Narayan	
1996	Bandish	"Na Mili Kahin Woh Heroine"	Anand-Milind	Udit Narayan,Jolly Mukherjee,Arun Ingle	
1996	Jaan	"Aai Bo Who Kaata"	Anand-Milind	Alka Yagnik, Bhavana Pandit	
1996	Mr. Bechara	"Dekho Dekho"	Anand-Milind	Vinod Rathod	
1996	Hahakaar	"Pyar Ka Exam"	Bappi Lahiri	Solo	
1996	Smuggler	"Tan Tana Tan Ho Gaya"	Bappi Lahiri	Baba Sehgal	
1996	Namak	"Om Jai Jagdish Hare"	Anu Malik	Abhijeet,Poonam Bhatia	
1996	Rakshak	"Sundara Sundara"	Anand-Milind	Vinod Rathod	
1996	Talaashi	"Waqt Ko Bhala"	Anand-Milind	Solo	
1996	Raja Hindustani	"Tere Ishq Mein Nachenge"	Nadeem-Shravan	Kumar Sanu, Alisha Chinai	
1996	Himmatvar	"Humein Aapse Milke"	Nadeem-Shravan	Sonu Nigam	
1997	Judaai	"Pyaar Pyaar Karte Karte"	Nadeem-Shravan	Alka Yagnik, Abhijeet Bhattacharya	
1997	Bhai Bhai	"Aankhen Jiski Mandir Masjid"	Aadesh Shrivastava	Kumar Sanu, Alka Yagnik, Udit Narayan	
1997	Mr. and Mrs. Khiladi	"Samose Mein Aaloo"	Anu Malik	Abhijeet,Poornima	
1998	Vinashak	"Moriya Moriya"	Viju Shah	Udit Narayan	
1998	Humse Badhkar Kaun	"Huf Haza"	Viju Shah	Vinod Rathod	
1998	Prem Aggan	"Prem Ishwar Hain"	Anu Malik	Udit Narayan	
1998	Sher-E-Hindustan	"Dakiya Babu Daku Hai Pakka"	Anand–Milind	Solo	
1999	Rajaji	"Sunday Ki Raat"	Anand–Milind	Kumar Sanu	
1999	Gair	"Laila Laila"	Anand–Milind	Abhijeet Bhattacharya	
1999	Mother	"Happy Days Are Here Again"	Dilip Sen-Sameer Sen	Hariharan, Roop Kumar Rathod	
1999	Benaam	"Chanda Jaisi bindiya"	Bappi Lahiri	Abhijeet	
1999	Benaam	"Jab Woh Nikalta Hai"	Bappi Lahiri	Amit Kumar	
2000	Krodh	"Sun Baba"	Anand–Milind	Vinod Rathod	
2000	Krodh	"Hai Deewana"	Anand–Milind	Solo	
2003	Andaaz	"Rabba Ishq Na Hove"	Nadeem-Shravan	Sonu Nigam, Alka Yagnik, Kailash Kher	
2004	Netaji Subhas Chandra Bose: The Forgotten Hero	"Ghoomparani"	A. R. Rahman	Satyanarayan Mishra	
2004	Inteqaam	"Armaan Dil Ke Machalne Lage Hain"	Anand–Milind	Solo	
2004	Love in Nepal	"Love in Nepal"	Anu Malik	Sonu Nigam	
2004	Fida	"Nazar Nazar"	Anu Malik	Udit Narayan	
2004	Hatya	"Raat Ke Baj Gaye"	Nadeem-Shravan	Roop Kumar Rathod	
2004	Sheen	"O Sanam Kuja Beri"	Nadeem-Shravan	Sonu Nigam	
2005	Bewafaa	"Pyar Ka Anjaam"	Nadeem-Shravan	Kumar Sanu, Alka Yagnik	
2005	Dus	"Cham Se"	Vishal–Shekhar	Sonu Nigam, Shaan, Babul Supriyo, Sunidhi Chauhan	
2006	Corporate	"Oh Sikandar"	Shamir Tandon	Kailash Kher	
2006	Mere Piya (Album)	"Aa Bhi Jaao Sanam"	Raju Singh	Sonu Nigam	
2006	Mere Piya (Album)	"Madhbhari"	Raju Singh	Sonu Nigam	
2006	Mere Piya (Album)	"Aas Pass"	Raju Singh	Sonu Nigam	
2006	Mere Piya (Album)	"Main Jaanoo Na"	Raju Singh	Sonu Nigam	
2006	Mere Piya (Album)	"Dil Mein Bhi Tum"	Raju Singh	Sonu Nigam	
2006	Mere Piya (Album)	"Dhadkano Mein"	Raju Singh	Sonu Nigam	
2006	Mere Piya (Album)	"Piya"	Pandit Satyanarayan Mishra	Sonu Nigam	
2007	Uroniya Mon	"Ujonire Railkhoni"	Prosenjit Lahon	Zubeen Garg	Assamese song
2009	Sanam Teri Kasam	"Yeh Dil Darr raha Hain"	Nadeem-Shravan		
2026	Dhurandhar: The Revenge	"Rang De Lal (Oye Oye)"	Shashwat Sachdev, Kalyanji–Anandji	Jasmine Sandlas, Afsana Khan, Reble, Amit Kumar	

== Awards ==
- Mukherjee received the Filmfare Best Female Playback Award for the song "Tirchi Topi Wale" from Tridev in 1990.
