= Sharat Saxena =

Indian actor

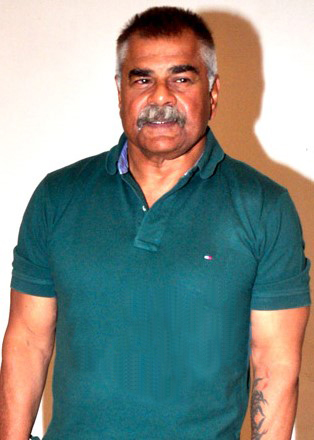
- Saxena in 2015
- Born: 17 August 1950 (age 76); Satna, Madhya Pradesh, India
- Education: Jabalpur Engineering College
- Occupation: Actor
- Years active: 1972–present
- Spouse: Shobha Saxena
- Children: 2

Sharat Saxena (born 17 August 1950) is an Indian actor who appears in Hindi films along with English, Telugu, Malayalam and Tamil films. He has acted in more than 250 Hindi films. Saxena started his career in the early 1970s and has mainly played supporting roles.

He has starred in some of the most successful films of Hindi cinema, including Mr. India, Tridev, Ghayal, Khiladi, Ghulam, Gupt: The Hidden Truth, Duplicate, Soldier, Baghban, Fanaa, Krrish, Ek Hi Raasta (1993), and Bajrangi Bhaijan. His performances in these films have established him as one of the best supporting actors in Hindi cinema.

He played the role of Kichaka in the television serial Mahabharat. He is well known for his roles in the movie Mr. India and the comedy movie Phir Hera Pheri. He was nominated for Filmfare Best Villain Award for Ghulam (1998).

== Early life ==
Sharat Saxena was born on 17 August 1950 in Satna, Madhya Pradesh. He spent most of his childhood in Bhopal. He is married to Shobha Saxena. He did his schooling from St. Joseph Convent School, Bhopal and Telecommunication Engineering|Engineering in Electronics & Telecommunication]] from Jabalpur Engineering College, he wanted to become an actor. So, in 1972, he came to Mumbai. It was tough because of his build, but eventually, he got the role of a henchman. Benaam was his first release. Then followed Dil Dewana, Agent Vinod, Kaala Patthar and others.

== Personal life ==
He currently lives in Madh Island, a colony on the outskirts of Mumbai. He lives with his wife, Shobha, and two children, Veera and Vishal.

== Filmography ==
=== Hindi films ===
Year	Film	Role	Notes
1974	Benaam		
1976	Jaaneman		
1977	Agent Vinod		
1978	Des Pardes		
1978	Kasme Vaade		
1979	Kaala Patthar		
1979	Tarana		
1979	Bhala Manus	Joseph	
1980	Dostana	Photographer / Daaga's Henchman	
1980	Lootmaar		
1980	Shaan		
1981	Main Aur Mera Haathi		
1982	Shakti		
1983	Pukar		
1984	Aasmaan	Major	
1984	Boxer	Raghuraj	
1985	Kanoon Kya Karega		
1985	Zamana		
1985	Aitbaar		
1985	Saagar		
1985	Bepanaah	Ujagar Singh	
1985	Maa Kasam	Makhan Singh	
1986	Mera Dharam		
1986	Manav Hatya	Inspector Joseph	
1986	Tan-Badan		
1986	Karma		
1987	Inaam Dus Hazaar		
1987	Mr. India	Daaga	
1987	Deewana Tere Naam Ka		
1987	Hifazat	Shambhu Dada	
1988	Khatron Ke Khiladi	Inspector Amarnath / Daku Jwala Singh	
1988	Shahenshah		
1989	Meri Zabaan		
1989	Rakhwala		
1989	Daana Paani		
1989	Tridev	Inspector Suraj	
1989	Paanch Paapi		
1989	Dost		
1990	Agneepath		
1990	Ghayal	Deeka	
1990	Thanedaar		
1990	Jurm		
1991	Mast Kalandar		
1991	Narsimha		
1991	Banjaran		
1991	Indrajeet	Batra	
1992	Rishta To Ho Aisa		
1992	Vishwatma		
1992	Khiladi	Bahadur Singh	
1992	Zulm Ki Hukumat	Reddy	
1993	Aashik Awara	Kargah	
1993	Ek Hi Raasta		
1993	Lootere		
1994	Beta Ho To Aisa		
1995	Policewala Gunda		
1997	Gupt: The Hidden Truth		
1997	Ziddi		
1998	Duplicate		
1998	Ghulam	Raunak Singh	
1998	Soldier	Baldev Sinha	
1999	Safari		
1999	Baadshah	Moti	
2000	Phir Bhi Dil Hai Hindustani		
2000	Josh		
2000	Aaghaaz		
2001	Ajnabee		
2002	Maa Tujhhe Salaam		
2002	Tumko Na Bhool Paayenge		
2002	Rishtey		
2002	Saathiya		
2003	Baghban		
2003	2 October		
2003	Haasil		
2003	Paanch		Unreleased
2004	Meenaxi: A Tale of Three Cities	Maharawal	
2004	Asambhav		
2004	Tumsa Nahin Dekna		
2005	Vaah! Life Ho Toh Aisi!		
2005	Viruddh		
2005	Mumbai Xpress		Bilingual film
2006	Phir Hera Pheri	Tiwari Seth a.k.a "Totla Seth"	
2006	Bhagam Bhag	Fredrick	
2006	Baabul		
2006	Fanaa		
2006	Alag		
2006	Krrish	Vikram Sinha	
2006	Pyaar Ke Side Effects		
2008	Hello		
2009	De Dana Dan	CBI Inspector Wilson Perera	
2009	Vaada Raha... I Promise		
2010	Kushti		
2011	Ready	Suraj Chaudhary	
2011	Bodyguard		
2012	Bumboo		
2013	Deewana Main Deewana		
2013	John Day		
2013	Club 60		
2013	Bullett Raja		
2014	Hasee Toh Phasee		
2014	Singham Returns	Mumbai Police Commissioner Shiv Rathod	
2015	Bajrangi Bhaijaan	Dayanand Pandey	
2015	Kis Kisko Pyaar Karoon		
2015	Pyaar Ka Punchnama 2		
2018	Thugs Of Hindostan		
2018	Race 3	Raghu	
2018	Dassehra		
2019	Dabangg 3	SP Satyendra	
2019	Hansa Ek Sanyog		
2020	Jai Mummy Di		
2020	It's My Life		Delayed release; Filmed in 2007
2021	Sherni		
2021	Tadap		
2023	Hume Toh Loot Liya		MX Player film
2024	Naam - The Missing Identity	CBI chief Safaraz Khan	Delayed release; Filmed in 2004
2025	Son Of Sardar 2	Ranjit Singh	
2025	Saali Mohabbat		
2026	The Great Grand Superhero		

=== Other language films ===
Year	Film	Role	Language	Notes
1982	Ucha Dar Babey Nanak Da		Punjabi	
1985	Jeevante Jeevan		Malayalam	
1988	Aryan		Malayalam	
1989	Ashoka Chakravarthy	Majid Khan	Telugu	
1991	Gunaa		Tamil	
1991	Kilukkam	Samar Khan	Malayalam	
1991	Nirnayam		Telugu	
1991	Agni Nilavu		Malayalam	
1992	Mannan		Tamil	
1992	Gharana Mogudu		Telugu	
1993	Mutha Mestri	Athma	Telugu	
1993	Money		Telugu	
1993	Bangaru Bullodu		Telugu	
1994	Thenmavin Kombath	Mallikkettu	Malayalam	
1994	Gandeevam		Telugu	
1994	S. P. Parasuram	Bhavani	Telugu	
1994	Mugguru Monagallu		Telugu	
1994	Money Money		Telugu	
1995	Raja Simham		Telugu	
1995	Nirnayam	Iftikhar	Malayalam	
1995	Thakshashila		Malayalam	
1997	Ugadi		Telugu	
2000	Okkadu Chalu	Dhanraj	Telugu	
2000	Sudhandhiram		Tamil	
2001	Ajnabee		Hindi	
2001	Narasimha		Tamil	
2002	Parasuram		Malayalam	
2003	C. I. D. Moosa	Khalid Mohammad Baba	Malayalam	
2003	Indiramma	Kesava Rayudu	Telugu	
2003	Simhadri		Telugu	
2005	Mumbai Xpress		Tamil	Bilingual film
2005	Bunny		Telugu	
2005	The Great New Wonderful		English	
2006	Kilukkam Kilukilukkam	Samar Khan	Malayalam	
2012	Rahe Chardi Kala Punjab Di		Punjabi	
2013	Sringaravelan	Ahuja	Malayalam	
2017	Si3		Tamil	
2017	Vivegam		Tamil	
2022	Gold	Colonel Singhania	Malayalam	
2025	Madha Gaja Raja	Dhandapani (Master)	Tamil	Delayed release; Filmed in 2012
2026	Mana Shankara Vara Prasad Garu	MP Nitin Sharma	Telugu	

=== TV series ===
- Mahabharat – Kichaka
- Kanoon – Avinash/Inspector Sooraj Singh
- Main Dilli Hoon – Shukracharya
- Sajan Re Phir Jhoot Mat Bolo – Kulguru Trikaldarshi

== Awards and nominations ==
- 1998: Nominated :Filmfare Best Villain Award for Ghulam
