= Gupt: The Hidden Truth =

1997 Indian film by Rajiv Rai

Gupt
- Theatrical release poster
- Directed by: Rajiv Rai
- Screenplay by: Shabbir Boxwala
- Dialogues by: Naeem Sha
- Story by: Rajiv Rai
- Produced by: Gulshan Rai
- Starring: Bobby Deol; Manisha Koirala; Kajol; Om Puri; Prem Chopra; Paresh Rawal; Sadashiv Amrapurkar; Ashok Saraf; Sharat Saxena; Dalip Tahil; Raza Murad; Kulbhushan Kharbanda; Harish Patel; Priya Tendulkar
- Cinematography: Ashok Mehta
- Edited by: Rajiv Rai
- Music by: Viju Shah
- Production company: Trimurti Films
- Distributed by: Zee Telefilms; Eros Entertainment
- Release date: 4 July 1997
- Running time: 175 minutes
- Country: India
- Language: Hindi
- Budget: ₹9.50 crore
- Box office: ₹33.23 crore

Gupt (transl. Secret: The Hidden Truth), shortly called Gupt, is a 1997 Indian Hindi-language mystery thriller film directed by Rajiv Rai. The film stars Bobby Deol, Manisha Koirala, Kajol and Om Puri in the lead roles. Distributed under the banner of Trimurti Films, it also stars Prem Chopra, Raza Murad, Paresh Rawal, Sadashiv Amrapurkar, Sharat Saxena, Dalip Tahil, Kulbhushan Kharbanda, Priya Tendulkar, Aparajita and others in supporting roles. The soundtrack was composed by Viju Shah. It is considered as one of the best thriller films from Hindi Cinema. Its plot is based on the crime/mystery novel Good Children Don't Kill (1967) by French writer Louis Thomas.

At the 43rd Filmfare Awards, Gupt received 8 nominations, including Best Film and Best Director (Rai), and won 3 awards, including Best Villain.

== Plot ==
Sahil Sinha is not close to his stepfather, Governor Jaisingh Sinha, who still loves Sahil as his own. Governor Sinha arranges Sahil's marriage to Sheetal Chaudhary, Sahil's college friend, but Sahil is in love with Isha Diwan, the daughter of the governor's secretary Ishwar and Sahil's childhood friend. They get into a heated argument during Sahil's birthday, and Sahil picks up the cake knife in rage, but his mother stops him. The next day, Sahil heads home to confront Governor Sinha. Before he can get there, Governor Sinha is fatally stabbed by an unknown assailant. Sahil finds a locket in his hand. His mother finds Sahil with his hand on the knife, and believes he's responsible. Sahil is arrested, and sentenced to 14 years in prison. Before going to prison, he tells Sheetal to take the locket so he can prove his innocence.

Sahil escapes with Sheetal's help, and sets out to find the real killer. To find Sahil, Inspector Uddham Singh is assigned to the case. Sahil later meets Isha, and calls Dr. Gandhi for help. Dr. Gandhi says he has a secret to share with Sahil, and calls him over that evening. By the time he gets to the house, Sahil finds Dr. Gandhi dead. Sahil goes to his house to get his stepfather's will, but is shunned by his mother. Sahil tells her he finally realizes how much his stepfather loved him, and wished he had realized before he died. He goes after the governor's lawyer, Thanawala, Sheetal's uncle and father, and Vilas Rao, a union leader, but they all insist they're not responsible. To save himself, Vilas Rao accuses Minister Bose.

Sahil kidnaps the Minister with the help of Isha and Sheetal, but is caught by Uddham. However, Uddham lets him go upon realizing that Sahil is not the murderer. He examines the evidence from the two murders, and realizes both daggers are similar, suggesting they're from a set. He goes to Ishwar's house, where Sahil's mother is, and finds the entire set of daggers there. Ishwar confesses to the murders, saying he was upset that the governor refused Isha, and Dr. Gandhi realized he was the killer. Ishwar is arrested, and Sheetal tells a shocked Sahil and Isha this news. Upset, Isha quickly leaves.

Sahil goes home, where his mother welcomes him back. Sahil's younger brother is playing with the locket, and is able to open it. When Sahil looks inside, he's shocked to discover that Isha is the killer. At the same time, Isha tries to kill Uddham, but she's interrupted and flees, leaving Uddham injured but alive. Sahil confronts Ishwar at the jail. Ishwar admits the truth, revealing that Isha killed Dr. Gandhi's dog after he bit Sahil when they were kids. Dr. Gandhi and the governor sent Isha away to boarding school despite Ishwar refusing, because they wanted to separate Sahil and Isha. When Isha and Sahil reunited, the governor still refused to accept Isha. Furious, Isha killed the governor. Dr. Gandhi also suspected Isha, so she killed him. Though Ishwar wants to take the fall for Isha, they find out about Uddham's attack, and Sahil heads out to stop her.

Sahil heads to Sheetal's house, knowing she is Isha's next target. Before he gets there, Isha comes and tries to kill Sheetal. While Sahil tries to fight off Isha, Uddham shows up and shoots Isha. Sahil assures Isha he always loved her, though he's upset by her actions. Isha dies in Sahil's arms. In the end, Sahil unites with Sheetal.

== Cast ==
- Bobby Deol as Sahil Sinha
- Manisha Koirala as Sheetal Chaudhary
- Kajol as Isha Diwan
- Om Puri as Inspector Udham Singh
- Priya Tendulkar as Sharda Sinha, Sahil’s mother.
- Prem Chopra as Minister Sadanand Bose
- Raza Murad as Advocate Mushir Thanawala
- Paresh Rawal as Ishwar Diwan
- Sadashiv Amrapurkar as Inspector Neelkanth Pandey
- Sharat Saxena as Vilasrao Mhatre
- Dalip Tahil as Meghnad Chaudhary
- Kulbhushan Kharbanda as Dr. Shubham Gandhi
- Raj Babbar as Governor Jaisingh Sinha (special appearance)
- Mukesh Rishi as Babu Anna (special appearance)
- Harish Patel as Phoolchand Raje
- Ashok Saraf as Constable Pandu
- Anjan Srivastav as Police Commissioner Manoj Patwardhan
- Tej Sapru as Jailor Pratap Sinha
- Vishwajeet Pradhan as Hunter Vivek
- Dinesh Hingoo as Lal, Thanawala's Servant
- Aparajita as Surabhi Chaudhary
- Harsh Lunia as Harsh Sinha
- Bob Christo as Boat organiser
- Mahru Sheikh as girl #1 in the song "Duniya Haseenon Ka Mela"
- Bhanu Khan as girl #2 in the song "Duniya Haseenon Ka Mela"

== Music ==
Gupt: The Hidden Truth

Soundtrack album by Viju Shah
- Released: 4th July 1997
- Recorded: Tips Industries
- Studio: Trimurti Films
- Genre: Feature film soundtrack
- Length: 43:53
- Language: Hindi
- Producer: Viju Shah

Viju Shah chronology
Prithivi (1997)	Gupt: The Hidden Truth (1997)	Aar Ya Paar (1997)

The music was composed by Viju Shah and the lyrics were written by Anand Bakshi. The title track of the film, "Gupt Gupt", samples the electronica track "Deep Forest" from the eponymous album by Deep Forest and the titular tracks from Mike Oldfield's seminal prog-rock orchestral debut Tubular Bells (revisited and sampled numerous times since). "Duniya Hasino Ka Mela" was sampled from "Matsuri" included in the new age album Kojiki by Japanese keyboardist Kitarō.

Shah's work won the Best Background Score and Shah was nominated for the Best Music Director, whereas Alka Yagnik was also nominated for the Best Female Playback Singer for "Mere Khwabon Me Tu".

No.	Title	Playback	Length
1.	"Gupt Gupt"	Kavita Krishnamurthy, Hema Sardesai, Chetan	2:55
2.	"Duniya Haseenon Ka Mela"	Udit Narayan, Suneeta Rao	6:31
3.	"Mushkil Bada Yeh Pyar Hai"	Alka Yagnik, Udit Narayan	5:52
4.	"Mere Khwaabon Me Tu"	Alka Yagnik, Kumar Sanu	5:34
5.	"Ye Pyar Kya Hai"	Kavita Krishnamurthy, Kumar Sanu, Alka Yagnik	6:34
6.	"Yeh Pyasi Mohabbat"	Alka Yagnik	6:1
7.	"Mere Sanam Tujko"	Udit Narayan, Sadhna Sargam	5:48
8.	"Gupt Gupt (extended version)"	Kavita Krishnamurthy, Hema Sardesai, Chetan	4:54

== Box office ==
Gupt turned out to be a blockbuster movie. On the opening day it collected ₹9.6 million and by the opening weekend it had grossed ₹27.8 million. The first week collections were ₹53.45 million with an India gross of ₹317.2 million. Worldwide gross collections were ₹332.3 million, with an overseas gross of US$425,000. The adjusted net-gross of the film is ₹1.68 billion.

== Reception ==
=== Critical response ===
Suparn Verma of Rediff.com wrote, "In Gupt, Rajiv Rai seems to have forgotten an elementary lesson, "Sometimes less is more." The result: the less you see of Gupt, the better."

== Accolades ==
Kajol became the first actress in the history of the Filmfare Awards to win the Best Performance in a Negative Role.

43rd Filmfare Awards:

Category	Recipients	Result
Best Villain	Kajol	Won
Best Background Score	Viju Shah	Won
Best Editing	Rajiv Rai	Won
Best Film	Gupt: The Hidden Truth	Nominated
Best Director	Rajiv Rai	Nominated
Best Supporting Actor	Om Puri	Nominated
Best Music Director	Viju Shah	Nominated
Best Female Playback Singer	Alka Yagnik for "Mere Khwabon Mein Tu"	Nominated

== See also ==
- Red herring (narrative)
- Twist ending
