= Viju Shah =

Indian composer of Hindi film scores (born 1959)

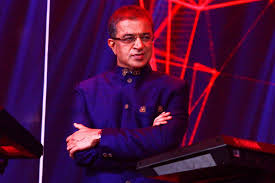
- Born: Vijay Shah; 5 June 1959 (age 67)
- Occupations: Musician, score composer
- Years active: 1989–present
- Spouse: Sunanda Shah
- Parent: Kalyanji Virji Shah

Vijay Shah (born 5 June 1959), popularly known as Viju Shah, is an Indian composer in the Hindi film industry. He is the son of Kalyanji Virji Shah, one-half of the composer duo Kalyanji–Anandji.

Shah has composed soundtracks for over 20 Hindi films, including Tridev (1989), Vishwatma (1992), Mohra (1994), Gupt: The Hidden Truth (1997), and Bade Miyan Chote Miyan (1998). He won the Filmfare Award for Best Background Score in 1998 for his work in Gupt: The Hidden Truth.

== Career ==
=== Early career and breakthrough (1985–1992) ===
Shah made his Bollywood debut in 1985 with Rajiv Rai's action thriller Yudh, where he was credited as Vijay Shah. This was the first of his multiple collaborations with Rai.

In 1989, Shah gained recognition with the soundtrack for Rai's musical action thriller Tridev. The film's soundtrack included the song "Tirchi Topiwale,” for which received his first nomination for the Filmfare Award for Best Music Director and inspired a 1998 film of the same name.

=== Rise to prominence (1992–1997) ===
In 1992, following the success of Tridev, Shah composed the soundtrack for Rai's action thriller Vishwatma. The following year, he composed the score for the action drama Lootere (1993), which earned him his first nomination for the Filmfare Award for Best Background Score.

In 1994, Shah composed the soundtrack for Rai's action thriller Mohra, which featured songs including "Tu Cheez Badi Hai Mast Mast" and "Tip Tip Barsa Pani." The album emerged as the second highest-selling Bollywood soundtrack album of the year (after Hum Aapke Hain Koun), with over 8 million units. The film earned Shah his second nomination for the Filmfare Award for Best Music Director. That same year, he composed the background score for Rajkumar Santoshi's comedy Andaz Apna Apna, which earned him a second nomination for the Filmfare Award for Best Background Score.

He composed the soundtrack for the romantic drama Tere Mere Sapne (1996), produced by Amitabh Bachchan's ABCL. The film's soundtrack earned Shah his third nomination for the Filmfare Award for Best Music Director.

Shah and Rai next collaborated on the murder mystery thriller Gupt: The Hidden Truth (1997). The film's soundtrack emerged as the third highest-selling Bollywood album of the year (after Dil To Pagal Hai and Pardes). It earned him the Filmfare Award for Best Background Score despite most of the tunes plagiarised from other sources as it is, along with his fourth nomination for Best Music Director.

Shah has regularly plagiarised music while collaborating with Rai ,right from Tridev to Asambhav.

=== Later work (1998–present) ===
In 1998, Shah composed for David Dhawan's action comedy Bade Miyan Chote Miyan. The film's soundtrack included the song 'Makhna,' which gained popularity during the film's release. Shah received his fifth nomination for the Filmfare Award for Best Music Director for the film's soundtrack.

His collaboration with Rai continued with Pyaar Ishq Aur Mohabbat (2001) and Asambhav (2004).

In 2020, Shah composed the score for the Netflix crime drama film Class of '83.

== Accolades ==
Year	Award	Category	Film	Result	Ref.
1990	35th Filmfare Awards	Best Music Director	Tridev	Nominated	
1994	39th Filmfare Awards	Best Background Score	Lootere	Nominated	
1995	40th Filmfare Awards	Best Music Director	Mohra	Nominated	
1995	40th Filmfare Awards	Best Background Score	Andaz Apna Apna	Nominated	
1997	42nd Filmfare Awards	Best Music Director	Tere Mere Sapne	Nominated	
1998	43rd Filmfare Awards	Best Music Director	Gupt: The Hidden Truth	Nominated	
1998	43rd Filmfare Awards	Best Background Score	Gupt: The Hidden Truth	Won	
1998	1st Zee Cine Awards	Best Music Director	Gupt: The Hidden Truth	Nominated	
1999	44th Filmfare Awards	Best Music Director	Bade Miyan Chote Miyan	Nominated	

== Discography ==
Year	Name	Note(s)
1985	Yudh	Background Score
1988	Why not Synthesizer?	Instrumental/synthesizer album
1989	Tridev	Nominated—Filmfare Award for Best Background Score
1990	Muqaddar Ka Badshaah	
1990	Jaanam	Album with Amit Kumar and Sapna Mukherjee
1992	Vishwatma	All Remix "Saat Samundar Paar", "Toofan", "Dil Le Gayi Teri Bindiya", "Aankhon Mein Hai Kya"
1992	Junoon	Background music only
1992	Yalgaar	Background music only
1993	Lootere	Nominated—Filmfare Award for Best Background Score
1994	Mohra	Nominated—Filmfare Award for Best Music Director
1994	Andaz Apna Apna	Nominated—Filmfare Award for Best Background Score
1995	Ravan Raaj	
1996	Tere Mere Sapne	Nominated—Filmfare Award for Best Music Director
1997	Prithvi	
1997	Gupt	Won—Filmfare Award for Best Background Score; Nominated—Filmfare Award for Best Music Director
1997	Aar Ya Paar	
1998	Vinashak	
1998	Humse Badhkar Kaun	
1998	Bade Miyan Chote Miyan	Nominated—Filmfare Award for Best Music Director
2000	Bulandi	
2000	Beti No. 1	Also playback singer
2001	Pyaar Ishq Aur Mohabbat	
2001	Hadh	
2001	Kasam	
2003	Dhund	
2003	Kaise Kahoon Ke Pyaar Hai	
2003	Tujhe Meri Kasam	
2004	Asambhav	
2004	K. Street Pali Hill	
2005	Shikhar	
2006	Yun Hota Toh Kya Hota	
2007	Victoria No. 203	
2011	Loot	Background score
2015	Aa Te Kevi Dunniya	Gujarati film
2016	Julie 2	
2020	Class of '83	Background score
2025	Zora	
2026	Zora Zorawar	
