= Tridev =

1989 Indian film by Rajiv Rai

- Theatrical release poster
- Directed by: Rajiv Rai
- Screenplay by: Rajiv Rai
- Dialogues by: K. K. Singh
- Story by: Rajiv Rai
- Produced by: Gulshan Rai
- Starring: Naseeruddin Shah; Sunny Deol; Jackie Shroff; Madhuri Dixit; Sonam; Sangeeta Bijlani; Anupam Kher; Amrish Puri
- Narrated by: Naseeruddin Shah
- Cinematography: Romesh Bhalla
- Edited by: Naresh Malhotra
- Music by: Viju Shah; Kalyanji–Anandji
- Production company: Trimurti Films Pvt. Ltd.
- Distributed by: Trimurti Films Pvt. Ltd.
- Release date: 7 July 1989
- Country: India
- Language: Hindi
- Budget: ₹2 crore
- Box office: ₹17 crore

Tridev (transl. Trinity) is a 1989 Indian action thriller film written and directed by Rajiv Rai. It stars Naseeruddin Shah, Sunny Deol, Jackie Shroff, Madhuri Dixit, Sonam, Sangeeta Bijlani, Anupam Kher and Amrish Puri.

The film was critically acclaimed and commercially blockbuster at the box office and won two Filmfare Awards at the 35th Filmfare Awards in 1990. The film was remade in Telugu as Nakshatra Poratam, with Suman, Bhanuchander Prasad and Arun Pandian.

== Plot ==
The story begins with Inspector Karan Saxena, an honest and diligent police officer. He's the son of a respected judge, Saxena, and is engaged to his girlfriend, Divya, the daughter of his boss, Commissioner Mathur. Karan is assigned to investigate the assassination of an honest politician, a crime orchestrated by the ruthless crime lord Bhujang. Bhujang’s criminal enterprise includes his associate Don, his sons Goga and Ranga, his brother Raghav and Inspector Suraj Singh.

As Karan gets closer to exposing Bhujang's network, he takes a small-time arms dealer, Ramesh Tejani, into custody. The information Ramesh provides enables Karan to arrest Bhujang’s associate, Don. In retaliation, Bhujang has Karan's father, Judge Saxena, and Ramesh murdered. He gets Don released from jail and then frames Karan, who, despite his honesty, is transferred to a remote small town, Madhopur, by Commissioner Mathur due to political pressure. Although Mathur compels Karan to break his engagement to his daughter, Divya's love for Karan remains steadfast, and she remains a source of unwavering support for him, even after he's disgraced and sent away.

In Madhopur, Karan meets and befriends Jai Singh, a fiery outlaw seeking revenge against the dacoit Bhairav Singh, the very man who murdered his father years ago. Unbeknownst to Jai, Bhairav Singh is Bhujang. Jai falls in love with a film actress, Renuka, who is the daughter of a corrupt minister. The minister is on Bhujang's payroll, a fact that Renuka is unaware of. Meanwhile, Commissioner Mathur's son, Ravi, the black sheep of the family, is lured into Bhujang's gang. Bhujang kidnaps Ravi's younger sister, Divya, to force the release of Raghav from prison. Ravi helps break Raghav out of jail to save Divya, believing he's doing the right thing.

Ravi joins Bhujang's gang to gather intel from within. He meets Natasha, Ramesh's sister, who is also undercover to avenge her brother's death. When Commissioner Mathur decides to bring Karan back to the city, Bhujang orders Ravi and his associates to kill him. It appears that Karan has been killed. Divya is devastated upon hearing of his death and vows never to marry anyone else. In reality, Karan and Ravi have faked Karan's death, and Ravi starts helping Karan bring down Bhujang. Ravi gives Karan information on Bhujang's activities, and in turn, Karan starts destroying Bhujang’s illegal properties and killing his henchmen. Karan also foils a major bank robbery by Bhujang’s cohorts, which results in the deaths of Bhujang’s elder son, Goga, and Inspector Suraj Singh. Angered by this, Bhujang swears all-out revenge on Karan. Meanwhile, Jai, who has moved to the city, recognises Bhujang as the man who killed his father. He also joins Karan against Bhujang. The three — Karan, Jai, and Ravi — form a trio known as "Tridev". Divya is elated to see Karan alive.

Together, the three — Karan, Ravi and Jai — with the help of Divya, Natasha and Renuka, foil Bhujang's plans. They are initially framed for the crimes but manage to escape and storm Bhujang's hideout. In the climax, the "Tridev" confront Bhujang, defeat his men, and finally kill the crime lord, bringing justice for their families and themselves. The film ends with the three couples — Karan and Divya, Ravi and Natasha, and Jai and Renuka — uniting.

== Cast ==
- Naseeruddin Shah as Jai Singh – Renuka's boyfriend
- Sunny Deol as Inspector Karan Saxena – Divya’s boyfriend and fiancé
- Jackie Shroff as Ravi Mathur – Divya's elder brother, Natasha's boyfriend
- Madhuri Dixit as Divya Mathur – Ravi’s younger sister, Karan’s girlfriend and fiancée
- Sonam as Renuka – Jai’s girlfriend
- Sangeeta Bijlani as Natasha Tejani – Ravi’s girlfriend
- Anupam Kher as Commissioner Mathur – Divya and Ravi’s father
- Amrish Puri as Bhujang / Bhairav Singh
- Raza Murad as Minister – Renuka's father
- Dalip Tahil as Don – Bhujang's partner
- Sharat Saxena as Inspector Suraj Singh – Bhujang's minion
- Tej Sapru as Goga – Bhujang's elder son
- Dan Dhanoa as Ranga – Bhujang's younger son
- Rajesh Vivek as Raghav – Bhujang’s younger brother
- Anjana Mumtaz as Sudha Mathur – Commissioner Mathur’s wife, Divya and Ravi’s mother
- Yunus Parvez as Film Director Maneklal Khanna
- Subbiraj as Judge Saxena – Karan’s father
- Satyajeet as Inspector Tripathi
- Shekhar Suman as Shrikant Verma
- Vijayendra Ghatge as Ramesh Tejani – Natasha’s brother
- Ajit Vachhani as Teja – Don's Lawyer
- Gavin Packard as Dunhill – Bhujang's associate
- Chandrashekhar as Minister Laxmandas
- Javed Khan Amrohi as Ramu
- Sulabha Deshpande (cameo appearance) as Tara massi

== Music and soundtrack ==
Tridev (Original Motion Picture Soundtrack)

Soundtrack album by Viju Shah
- Released: 7 July 1989
- Recorded: 1989
- Genres: Motion Picture Soundtrack, Filmi
- Length: 42:23
- Language: Hindi/Urdu
- Label: T-Series
- Producer: Kalyanji–Anandji
External audio
- Tridev (Audio Jukebox) on YouTube

The film's music was conducted and composed by Viju Shah and Kalyanji–Anandji. The lyrics of the songs were penned by Anand Bakshi.

"Oye Oye" samples "Rhythm Is Gonna Get You" by Gloria Estefan and Miami Sound Machine, and the Tridev theme is inspired by "One More Chance" by Pet Shop Boys. The song "Tirchhi Topiwale" was used thrice in films Double Dhamaal, Azhar and Dhurandhar: The Revenge. The song "Gali Gali Main Phirta Hai" is used in Hindi dubbed version of Kannada-language film KGF: Chapter 1.

No.	Title	Singer(s)	Length
1.	"Tridev - Prologue (narration)"	Naseeruddin Shah (narrator)
2.	"Main Teri Mohabbat Main"	Mohammed Aziz & Sadhana Sargam
3.	"Tirchi Topiwale"	Amit Kumar & Sapna Mukherjee
4.	"Gali Gali Mein Phirta Hai"	Manhar Udhas & Alka Yagnik
5.	"Gajar Ne Kiya Hai Ishara (Oye Oye)"	Sadhana Sargam, Alka Yagnik & Sapna Mukherjee
6.	"Main Teri Mohabbat Main (Part 2)"	Sadhana Sargam
7.	"Raat Bhar Jaam Se"	Alisha Chinoy
8.	"Tirchi Topiwale (Part 2)"	Amit Kumar & Sapna Mukherjee
9.	"Oye Oye"	Udit Narayan, Amit Kumar & Jolly Mukherjee

== Accolades ==
At the 35th Filmfare Awards, Tridev won two awards from six nominations.

Award	Category	Nominee	Result
35th Filmfare Awards	Best Female Playback Singer	Sapna Mukherjee for "Tirchhi Topiwale"	Won
35th Filmfare Awards	Best Sound Recording	B. V. Chaturvedi	Won
35th Filmfare Awards	Best Supporting Actor	Amrish Puri	Nominated
35th Filmfare Awards	Best Music Director	Viju Shah & Kalyanji–Anandji	Nominated
35th Filmfare Awards	Best Male Playback Singer	Amit Kumar for "Tirchhi Topiwale"	Nominated
35th Filmfare Awards	Best Female Playback Singer	Alisha Chinai for "Raat Bhar"	Nominated
