= Arjun Rampal filmography =

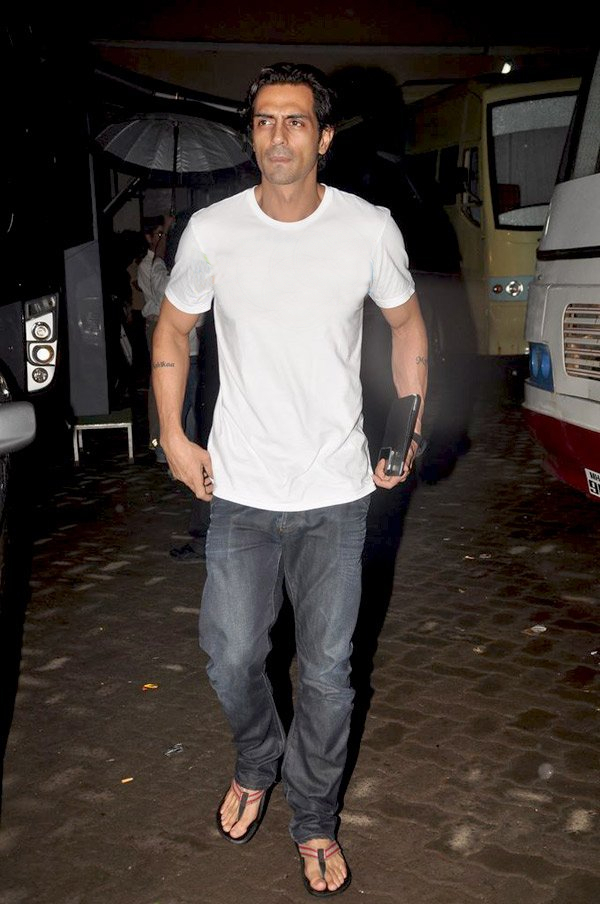
Rampal at a photoshoot for the film Don 2 in 2011

Arjun Rampal (born 26 November 1972) is an Indian actor, television personality, model and film producer known for his work in Bollywood films. Rampal made his debut in romance Pyaar Ishq Aur Mohabbat (2001) for which he was nominated for the Filmfare Award for Best Male Debut. However the film performed poorly at the box-office as did the next two films he starred in the same year, Moksha, and Deewaanapan. The heist thriller Aankhen (2002) proved to be his first commercially successful film. However Rampal's career declined as he starred in a number of films that performed poorly at the box-office such as Dil Ka Rishta (2003), Asambhav (2004), Vaada (2005), Yakeen (2005), Ek Ajnabee (2005) and Darna Zaroori Hai (2006).

Rampal's breakthrough came with his appearance in the 2006 action thriller Don opposite Shah Rukh Khan and Priyanka Chopra. Rampal followed this by playing the antagonist in Om Shanti Om (2007) with Shah Rukh Khan, and Deepika Padukone. The film was the highest grossing Hindi film of the year and Rampal received critical acclaim. For his performance as guitarist Joseph "Joe" Mascarenhas in Abhishek Kapoor's musical drama Rock On!! (2008), Rampal received the Filmfare Award for Best Supporting Actor as well as the National Film Award for Best Supporting Actor. In 2010, he garnered a nomination for the Filmfare Award for Best Supporting Actor for his role as a politician in Prakash Jha's political thriller Raajneeti.

== Films ==
Key
†	Denotes films that have not yet been released

Year	Title	Role(s)	Notes	Ref(s)
2001	Pyaar Ishq Aur Mohabbat	Gaurav Saxena		
2001	Moksha	Vikram Saigal		
2001	Deewaanapan	Suraj Saxena		
2002	Aankhen	Arjun Verma		
2002	Dil Hai Tumhaara	Dev Khanna		
2003	Dil Ka Rishta	Jai Mehta		
2003	Tehzeeb	Salim		
2004	Asambhav	Captain Aadit Arya		
2005	Vaada	Rahul Verma		
2005	Elaan	Arjun Srivastav		
2005	Yakeen	Nikhil Oberoi		
2005	Ek Ajnabee	Shekhar Verma		
2006	Humko Tumse Pyaar Hai	Rohit		
2006	Darna Zaroori Hai	Kunal	Segment: "Spirits Do Come"	
2006	Kabhi Alvida Naa Kehna	Jai		
2006	Don	Jasjit		
2006	Alag	Himself	Cameo appearance	
2006	I See You	Raj Jaiswal	Also producer	
2007	Honeymoon Travels Pvt. Ltd.	Jignesh	Special appearance	
2007	Om Shanti Om	Mukesh "Mike" Mehra		
2008	Rock On!!	Joseph "Joe" Mascarenhas		
2008	The Last Lear	Siddharth	English film	
2008	EMI	Ryan		
2009	Fox	Arjun Kapoor		
2010	Housefull	Major Krishna Rao		
2010	Raajneeti	Prithviraj Pratap		
2010	We Are Family	Aman		
2011	Rascals	Anthony Gonsalves		
2011	Ra.One	Ra.One		
2012	Heroine	Aryan Khanna		
2012	Chakravyuh	S. P. Adil Khan		
2012	Ajab Gazabb Love	Karan Singh Chauhan / Arjun Singh Chauhan (Note: Rampal plays dual role in this films.)		
2013	Inkaar	Rahul Verma		
2013	D-Day	Rudra Pratap Singh		
2013	Satyagraha	Arjun Pratap		
2014	Familywala	Raju		
2015	Roy	Kabir Grewal		
2016	Rock On 2	Joseph "Joe" Mascarenhas		
2016	Kahaani 2: Durga Rani Singh	Inderjeet Singh		
2017	Daddy	Arun Gawli	Also screenwriter and producer	
2018	Paltan	Lt. Col. Rai Singh Yadav		
2021	Nail Polish	Siddharth Jaisingh		
2022	The Rapist	Aftab Malik		
2022	Dhaakad	Rudraveer		
2023	Mystery of the Tattoo	Karan Abhimanyu	Cameo appearance	
2023	Bhagavanth Kesari	Rahul Sanghavi	Telugu film	
2024	Crakk	Dev		
2025	Nikita Roy	Sanal Roy		
2025	Dhurandhar	Major Iqbal		
2026	Dhurandhar: The Revenge	Major Iqbal		
2026	Satluj	Samudra Singh		
2026	Blind Game	Sikander		
TBA	Teesvi Manzil †	TBA	Completed	
2027	Operation Ganga †	TBA	Filming	

== Television ==
Year	Title	Role	Notes	Ref.
1995	A Mouthful of Sky		Cameo	
2008–2009	Nach Baliye 4	Judge	Reality show	
2011–2012	Love 2 Hate U	Host	Reality show	
2015	Discovery Real Heroes	Host	Documentary	
2019	The Final Call	Captain Karan Sachdev		
2022	London Files	Detective Om Singh		
2024	Bandish Bandits	Imroz	Cameo	
2025	Rana Naidu	Rauf Mirza		
TBA	O Saathi Re †	TBA	Filming	

== Music videos ==
Year	Title	Singer	Director
1996	Bekaraar	Shweta Shetty	
1997	Kinna Sona Tenu Rab Ne Banaya	Nusrat Fateh Ali Khan	Radhika Rao, Vinay Sapru
1998	Don't Marry Maya	Sanjeev Wadhwani	Rajiv Rai
