= List of awards and nominations received by Arjun Rampal =

Arjun Rampal awards and nominations
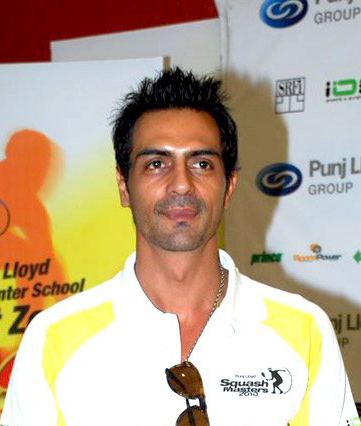
- Rampal at All India Squash Championship Awards
Awards and nominations
Award	Wins	Nominations
Producers Guild Awards	1	2
IIFA Awards	3	4
Filmfare Awards	1	3
National Film Awards	1	1
Screen Awards	2	3
Stardust Awards	1	1
Zee Cine Awards	2	3
AXN Action Awards	0	1
Other awards	1	0

Totals (Note: Certain award groups do not simply award one winner. They acknowledge several different recipients, have runners-up, and have third place. Since this is a specific recognition and is different from losing an award, runner-up mentions are considered wins in this award tally. For simplification and to avoid errors, each award in this list has been presumed to have had a prior nomination.)
- Wins: 12
- Nominations: 18

Arjun Rampal (born 26 November 1972) is an Indian film actor, model, film producer and television personality who works in Hindi films. He made his acting debut in Pyaar Ishq Aur Mohabbat. He was nominated for the Filmfare Award for Best Male Debut for the movie and won the Screen Award for Most Promising Newcomer – Male and IIFA Award for Star Debut of the Year – Male. He has won numerous awards including the National Film Award for Best Supporting Actor.

== Apsara Film & Television Producers Guild Awards ==
Year	Category	Film	Result	Ref.
2008	Best Actor in a Negative Role	Om Shanti Om	Nominated	
2011	Best Actor in a Supporting Role	Raajneeti	Won	
2014	Best Actor in a Supporting Role	D-Day	Nominated	

== AXN Action Awards ==
Year	Category	Film	Result
2006	Best Actor in a Negative Role	Ek Ajnabee	Nominated

== Filmfare Awards ==
Year	Category	Film	Result
2002	Best Male Debut	Pyaar Ishq Aur Mohabbat	Nominated
2008	Best Supporting Actor	Rock On!!	Won
2011	Best Supporting Actor	Raajneeti	Nominated

== International Indian Film Academy Awards ==
Year	Category	Film	Result
2002	Star Debut of the Year - Male	Pyaar Ishq Aur Mohabbat	Won
2008	Best Performance in a Negative Role	Om Shanti Om	Nominated
2009	Best Supporting Actor	Rock On!!	Won
2011	Best Supporting Actor	Raajneeti	Won

== National Film Awards ==
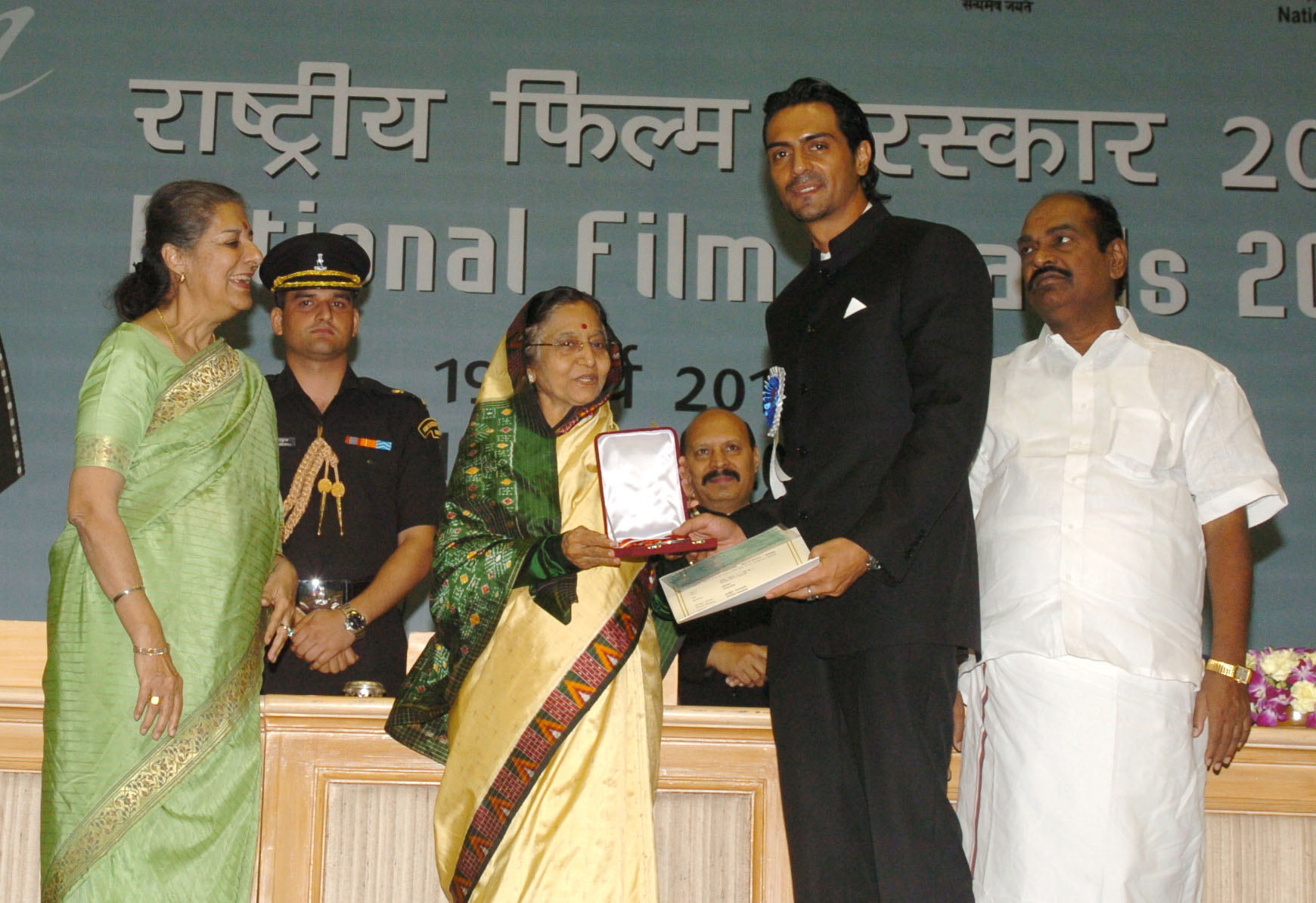
Rampal receiving the National Film Award for Best Supporting Actor for Hindi film “Rock On”, at the 56th National Film Awards function, 2010.

Year	Category	Film	Result
2009	Best Supporting Actor	Rock On!!	Won

== Screen Awards ==
Year	Category	Film	Result
2002	Most Promising Newcomer - Male	Pyaar Ishq Aur Mohabbat; Moksha: Salvation; Deewaanapan	Won
2008	Best Villain	Om Shanti Om	Nominated
2009	Best Supporting Actor	Rock On!!	Won

== Stardust Awards ==
Year	Category	Film	Result
2011	Best Supporting Actor	Housefull	Won

== Zee Cine Awards ==
Year	Category	Film	Result
2002	Best Male Debut	Deewaanapan	Nominated
2007	Best Actor in a Negative Role	Om Shanti Om	Won
2011	Best Actor in a Supporting Role - Male	Raajneeti	Won
2023	Best Actor in a Negative Role	Dhaakad	Nominated

== Other honours ==
- In 2010, Times of India listed Rampal at #8 in the 50 Most Desirable Men list of the year.
- In 2011, Rampal was ranked at #10.
- In 2012, Rampal was declared the "Most Desirable Man" of the year, beating 49 other men including actors, politicians and sportsmen.
- In 2012, Rampal also received the PowerBrands Hall of Fame Award for Dynamic personality – Cinema.
