= Vivek Agrawal =

Indian film producer

Vivek B. Agrawal
- Born: Vivek Bajrang Agrawal; Mumbai, Maharashtra, India
- Occupations: Film director; screenwriter; producer
- Years active: 1994–present

Vivek B. Agrawal (born 3 April 1974) is an Indian film producer, screenwriter, and film director who works in Hindi films. His productions include the English-language feature film Land Gold Women (2011), which won the National Film Award for Best Feature Film in English. Agrawal's production credits span multiple successful films, including Queen (2014), Bombay Velvet (2015), Udta Punjab (2016), Super 30 (2019), 83 (2021), The Girl On the Train (2021), and Vikram Vedha (2022).

Agrawal also produced the first Indian Netflix Original series Sacred Games (2018), where he supervised all eight episodes of the first season. In addition to producing, Agarwal directed the Hindi feature film I See You, starring Arjun Rampal.

== Early life and career ==
Vivek Agrawal was born in Mumbai, Maharashtra, India. At the age of 15, Agarwal developed interest in filmmaking. After completing a bachelor's degree in accounting and finance management, he left a master's program in economics and finance to work in the film industry as a production assistant.

Agarwal served as the head of Phantom Films from 2011 to 2019 and later led production at Reliance Entertainment. During this time, he oversaw the development and production of over 30 films and web series.

== Land Gold Women ==
Agarwal co-produced Land Gold Women through A Richer Lens Entertainment Private Limited, a production company he co-founded with his wife, Avantika Hari Agrawal. Avantika Hari directed and wrote the film, which addresses the issue of honor-based violence. Land Gold Women was released in India alongside the Movement to End Honour Violence, a campaign organized by A Richer Lens. The company maintains offices in Mumbai, Dubai, and London, Agarwal serving as its CEO.

Awards and Recognition

Land Gold Women received multiple accolades, including:

- National Film Award (2010) for Best Feature Film in English.
- Purple Orchid Award for Best Film from the Foreign Correspondents Association.
- Best Script/Screenplay (Avantika Hari) at the Asian Festival of First Films (2009).
- Royal Reel Award for Excellence in Filmmaking at the Canada International Film Festival (2010).
- Best of Show Award at The Indie Fest, USA.
- Best Film (Runner-up) at the ReelHeART International Film Festival in Toronto.
- Best Actor (Narinder Samra) and Best Cinematography (David Rom) at the ReelHeART International Film Festival.

The film premiered in the Indian Panorama section of the International Film Festival of Goa in 2009. It also received nominations for its soundtrack and for Best UK Feature (Avantika Hari Agrawal) at the East End Film Festival.

== Filmography ==
Year	Title	Director	Producer	Notes
2001	Moksha	Associate	Executive	
2005	Kisna: The Warrior Poet	Assistant	No	
2006	I See You	Yes	No	
2009	Victory	No	Executive	
2011	Mausam	No	Co-Producer	
2011	Land Gold Women	No	Co-Producer	
2012	London, Paris, New York	No	Executive	
2013	Ugly	No	Associate	
2013	Meridian Lines	No	Associate	
2014	Queen	No	Co-Producer	
2014	Hasee Toh Phasee	No	Associate	
2015	Bombay Velvet	No	Co-Producer	
2015	Shaandaar	No	Co-Producer	
2016	Raman Raghav 2.0	No	Associate	
2016	Udta Punjab	No	Associate	
2016	Wrong Side Raju	No	Associate	
2017	Commando 2: The Black Money Trail	No	Associate	
2018	High Jack	No	Co-Producer	
2018	Sacred Games	No	Executive	Television series
2019	Super 30	No	Co-Producer	
2020	Ghoomketu	No	Co-Producer	
2021	The Girl on the Train	No	Yes	
2021	83	No	Co-Producer	
2022	Sherdil: The Pilibhit Saga	No	Co-Producer	
2022	Vikram Vedha	No	Co-Producer	
2022	Code Name: Tiranga	No	Yes	
2025	Aabeer Gulaal	No	Yes	
2026	Bhai Tera Star Hai	Yes	Yes	
2026	Section 84 †	No	Yes	
