= Producers Guild Film Award for Best Actor in a Negative Role =

Annual Indian film award

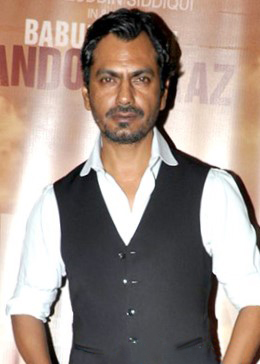
- 2016 Recipient Nawazuddin Siddiqui
- Awarded for: Best Performance by an Actor in a Negative Role
- Country: India
- Presented by: Film & Television Producers Guild
- First award: 2008 (for performances in films released around 2007)
- Currently held by: Nawazuddin Siddiqui, Badlapur (2016)
- Website: Producers Guild Film Awards

The Producers Guild Film Award for Best Actor in a Negative Role (previously known as the Apsara Award for Best Actor in a Negative Role) is given by the producers of the film and television guild as part of its annual award ceremony for Hindi films, to recognize an actor who has delivered an outstanding performance in a negative role, that is in the role of an antagonist. While the official awards ceremony started in 2004, this category was first introduced four years later.

== Winners and nominees ==
=== 2000s ===
- 2004 – No award
- 2005 – No award
- 2006 – No award
- 2007 – No award
- 2008 Neil Nitin Mukesh – Johnny Gaddaar as Vikram
  - Arjun Rampal – Om Shanti Om as Mukesh Mehra (Mike)
  - Kay Kay Menon – Life in a... Metro as Ranjeet
  - Shilpa Shukla – Chak De! India as Bindia Naik
  - Vivek Oberoi – Shootout at Lokhandwala as Maya Dolas
- 2009 Akshaye Khanna – Race as Rajeev Singh
  - Govind Namdeo – Sarkar Raj as Hassan Qazi
  - Imran Khan – Kidnap as Kabir Sharma
  - Kali Prasad Mukherjee – A Wednesday! as Ibrahim Khan
  - Naseeruddin Shah – Mithya as Gavde

=== 2010s ===
- 2010 Amol Gupte – Kaminey as Sunil Shekhar Bhope (Bhope Bhau)
  - Ajay Devgn – London Dreams as Arjun
  - Deepak Dobriyal – Gulaal as Bhati
  - Mahesh Manjrekar – Wanted as Inspector Talpade
  - Prakash Raj – Wanted as Gani Bhai
- 2011 Sonu Sood – Dabangg as Chedi Singh
  - Arjan Bajwa – Crook as Samarth
  - Emraan Hashmi – Once Upon a Time in Mumbaai as Shoaib Khan
  - Manoj Bajpai – Raajneeti as Veerendra Pratap
  - Ronit Roy – Udaan as Bhairav
- 2012 Prakash Raj - Singham as Jaykant Shikre
- 2015 Riteish Deshmukh - Ek Villain as Rakesh Mahadkar
- 2016 Nawazuddin Siddiqui - Badlapur as Liak Mohammed Tungrekar

== See also ==
- Producers Guild Film Awards
