= Producers Guild Film Award for Best Actor in a Supporting Role =

Annual Indian film award

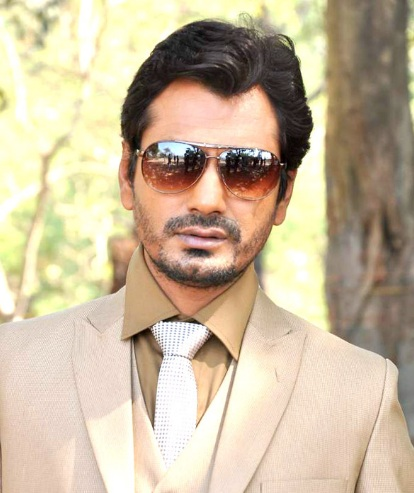
- 2016 Recipient Nawazuddin Siddiqui
- Awarded for: Best Performance by an Actor in a Supporting Role
- Country: India
- Presented by: Film & Television Producers Guild
- First award: 2004 (for performances in films released around 2003)
- Final award: 2016 (for performances in films released around 2015)
- Currently held by: Nawazuddin Siddiqui for Bajrangi Bhaijan
- Website: Producers Guild Film Awards

The Producers Guild Film Award for Best Actor in a Supporting Role (previously known as the Apsara Award for Best Actor in a Supporting Role) is given by the producers of the film and television guild as part of its annual award ceremony for Hindi films, to recognise a male actor who has delivered an outstanding performance in a supporting role. Following its inception in 2004, no one was awarded in 2005 and 2007.

† - indicates the performance also won the Filmfare Award
‡ - indicates the performance was also nominated for the Filmfare Award

== Superlatives ==
Superlative	Best Actor in a Leading Role		Best Actor in a Supporting Role		Overall	
Actor with most awards	Hrithik Roshan; Shahrukh Khan; Ranbir Kapoor	2	Abhishek Bachchan	2	Hrithik Roshan; Shahrukh Khan; Ranbir Kapoor; Abhishek Bachchan	2
Actor with most nominations	Shahrukh Khan	7	Irrfan Khan; Naseeruddin Shah; Nawazuddin Siddiqui	3	Shahrukh Khan	7
Actor with most nominations (without ever winning)	Ajay Devgan	3	Naseeruddin Shah	3	Ajay Devgan; Naseeruddin Shah	4
Actor with most nominations in a single year	--	--	Rishi Kapoor (2010)	2	Rishi Kapoor (2010); Ajay Devgan (2011); Emraan Hashmi (2012); Nawazuddin Siddiqui (2013)	2

== Winners and nominees ==
=== 2000s ===
- 2004 Pankaj Kapur – Maqbool as Jahangir Khan (Abbaji)
  - Arshad Warsi – Munna Bhai M.B.B.S. as Circuit ‡
  - Irrfan Khan – Haasil as Ranvijay Singh
  - Paresh Rawal – Hungama as Radheysham Tiwari
  - Saif Ali Khan – Kal Ho Naa Ho as Rohit Patel †
- 2005 – No award
- 2006 Abhishek Bachchan – Yuva as Lallan Singh †
  - Akshay Kumar – Mujhse Shaadi Karogi as Arun a.k.a. Sunny ‡
  - Kay Kay Menon – Hazaaron Khwaishein Aisi as Siddharth Tyabji
  - Nana Patekar – Apaharan as Tabrez
  - Naseeruddin Shah – Iqbal as Mohit ‡
- 2007 – No award
- 2008 Irrfan Khan – Life in a... Metro as Monty †
  - Darshan Jariwala – Gandhi, My Father as Mahatma Gandhi
  - Mithun Chakraborty – Guru as Manik Dasgupta ‡
  - Rajat Kapoor – Bheja Fry as Ranjeet Thadani
- 2009 Jimmy Shergill – A Wednesday! as Arif Khan
  - Pankaj Kapur – Halla Bol as Sidhu
  - Purab Kohli – Rock On!! as KD
  - Ravi Jhankal – Welcome to Sajjanpur as Munnibai Mukhanni
  - Sonu Sood – Jodhaa Akbar as Rajkumar Sujamal ‡

=== 2010s ===
- 2010 Rishi Kapoor – Love Aaj Kal as Older Veer Singh
  - Anupam Kher – Wake Up Sid as Ram Mehra
  - Irrfan Khan – New York as Roshan
  - Rishi Kapoor – Luck by Chance as Rommy Rolly ‡
  - Vivek Oberoi – Kurbaan as Riyaz Masood
- 2011 Arjun Rampal – Raajneeti as Prithviraj Pratap ‡
  - Ajay Devgan – Raajneeti as Sooraj Kumar
  - Emraan Hashmi – Once Upon a Time in Mumbaai as Shoaib Khan ‡
  - Farooq Sheikh – Lahore as S.K. Rao
  - Naseeruddin Shah – Ishqiya as Iftikhar a.k.a. Khalujan
  - Raghubir Yadav – Peepli Live as Budhia
- 2012 Farhan Akhtar – Zindagi Na Milegi Dobara as Imraan †
  - Emraan Hashmi – The Dirty Picture as Abraham
  - Gulshan Devaiya – Shaitan as Karan Chaudhary a.k.a. KC
  - Naseeruddin Shah – The Dirty Picture as Suryakant ‡
  - Rana Daggubati – Dum Maaro Dum as DJ Joaquim "Joki" Fernandes
  - Randeep Hooda – Saheb, Biwi Aur Gangster as Lalit / Babloo
- 2013 Annu Kapoor – Vicky Donor as Dr. Baldev Chaddha †
  - Nawazuddin Siddiqui – Kahaani as Khan
  - Nawazuddin Siddiqui – Talaash: The Answer Lies Within as Taimur ‡
  - Piyush Mishra – Gangs of Wasseypur as Nasir
  - Saurabh Shukla – Barfi! as Sudhanshu Dutta
- 2014 Nawazuddin Siddiqui – The Lunchbox as Shaikh †
  - Aditya Roy Kapur – Yeh Jawaani Hai Deewani as Avinash "Avi" ‡
  - Abhay Deol – Raanjhanaa as Jasjeet Singh Shergill/Akram Zaidi
  - Arjun Rampal – D-Day as Captain Rudra Pratap Singh
  - Saif Ali Khan – Go Goa Gone as Boris
  - Saurabh Shukla – Jolly LLB as Justice Tripathi
- 2016 Nawazuddin Siddiqui – Bajrangi Bhaijaan as Chand Nawab

== See also ==
- Producers Guild Film Awards
- Producers Guild Film Award for Best Actor in a Leading Role
