= Mehr Jesia =

Indian model (born 1970)

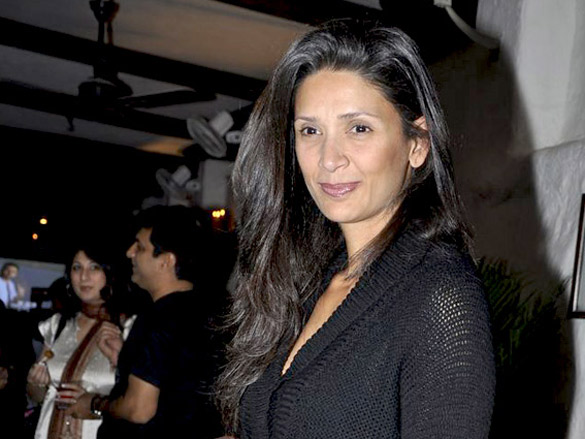
- Jesia at Dabboo Ratnani's calendar launch, 2011
- Born: 30 November 1970 (age 55); Mumbai, Maharashtra, India
- Occupation: Model
- Spouse: Arjun Rampal (m. 1998; div. 2019)
- Children: 2
- Beauty pageant titleholder
- Title: Femina Miss India Universe 1986
- Major competitions: Femina Miss India Universe 1986 (Winner); Miss Universe 1986 (Unplaced)

Mehr Jesia (born 30 November 1970) is an Indian producer, model and beauty pageant titleholder who won the title of Femina Miss India Universe 1986 and represented India at Miss Universe 1986.

== Early life and background ==
Jesia was born into a Parsi family on 30 November 1970. She completed her schooling in J B Vaccha High School for Parsi Girls, Dadar, Mumbai. She grew up in Dadar Parsi Colony in Mumbai.

== Career ==
Jesia started her career in 1980s, and won the Femina Miss India title in 1986. Soon she became a part of the first generation of Indian supermodels like Madhu Sapre, Feroze Gujral, Shyamolie Verma and Anna Bredmeyer.

=== Film career ===
Jesia and Arjun Rampal produced the film I See You (2006) through their production company Chasing Ganesha. The film starred Rampal, Vipasha Agarwal, Sonali Kulkarni and Boman Irani.

== Personal life ==
She married former model and Bollywood actor Arjun Rampal in 1998. They have two daughters. On 28 May 2018 the couple announced separation in a joint statement after 20 years of marriage. They were granted divorce by a Bandra family court in November 2019. The couple's two daughters will live with their mother.

Preceded by Sonu Walia	Miss India; 1986	Succeeded by Priyadarshini Pradhan
