= Aabeer Gulaal =

2025 Indian film by Aarti S. Bagdi

- Theatrical release poster
- Directed by: Aarti S. Bagdi
- Written by: Aarti S. Bagdi; Meghna Singhee
- Produced by: Avantika Hari; Vivek Agrawal; Rakesh Sippy
- Starring: Fawad Khan; Vaani Kapoor
- Cinematography: Tribhuvan Babu Sadineni
- Edited by: Aakash Yadav
- Music by: Amit Trivedi
- Production companies: A Richer Lens Production; Aarjay Pictures
- Release date: 12 September 2025
- Running time: 133 minutes
- Country: United Kingdom
- Language: Hindi

Aabeer Gulaal is a 2025 Hindi-language romantic comedy film produced by Vivek Agrawal and directed by Aarti S. Bagdi. The film stars Fawad Khan and Vaani Kapoor. it was scheduled for release on 9 May 2025. The film's release was delayed following the 2025 Pahalgam attack and ensuing India–Pakistan diplomatic tensions.

The film released on 12 September 2025 in many countries excluding India and Pakistan.

== Premise ==
When spirited Gulaal escapes an arranged marriage and lands in London, she crashes into the life of Aabeer Singh — a guarded restaurateur with a complicated past. Their lives collide through chaos, dance classes, and unexpected late-night rescues. What begins as rivalry slowly simmers into something deeper neither is ready for. But love demands more than chemistry — it asks them both to heal, forgive, and grow.

== Cast ==
- Fawad Khan as Aabeer Singh
- Vaani Kapoor as Gulaal Bajaj
- Riddhi Dogra as Avantika
- Lisa Haydon as Laila
- Farida Jalal as Nani
- Soni Razdan as Sushma
- Parmeet Sethi as Suresh
- Rahul Vohra as Dinesh
- Amrit Sandhu as Ruchita
- Sujoy De as Harry
- Dev Agrawal as Aman
- Hiten Patel as Mr. Suri
- Sophie Lovell Anderson as Vicky
- Mohammed Ibrahim hoque as Hassan
- Gandhar Babre as Mr. Khatri

== Production ==
=== Development ===
The film was initially titled Abir Gulaal, which was later changed to Aabeer Gulaal.

=== Filming ===
The film was first reported to be in development in July 2024. It is directed by Aarti S. Bagdi and produced by Indian Stories and A Richer Lens Entertainment. Producers include Vivek Agrawal, Avantika Hari and Rakesh Sippy.

The cast is led by Fawad Khan, Vaani Kapoor, Riddhi Dogra, Lisa Haydon, Farida Jalal, Soni Razdan, Parmeet Sethi and Rahul Vohra. The film has a supporting cast from India and UK.

Principal photography took place in London, England from 29 September 2024 with a filming schedule lasting into October and November.

== Soundtrack ==
Aabeer Gulaal

Soundtrack album by Amit Trivedi
- Released: 19 April 2025
- Genre: Feature film soundtrack
- Length: 21:16
- Language: Hindi
- Label: Saregama

Amit Trivedi chronology
Raid 2 (2025)	Aabeer Gulaal (2025)
External audio
- Aabeer Gulaal Full Album playlist on YouTube

All lyrics are written by Kumaar; all music is composed by Amit Trivedi.

Track listing
No.	Title	Singer(s)	Length
1.	"Khudaya Ishq"	Arijit Singh, Shilpa Rao	3:34
2.	"Angreji Rangrasiya"	Amit Trivedi, Chotu Khan, Akanksha Sethi	3:51
3.	"Tain Tain"	Amit Trivedi, Dimple Saikia	2:45
4.	"Doriyaan"	Arijit Singh, Shreya Ghoshal	4:47
5.	"Khalbaliyaan"	Simran Choudhary, Taylor Jones	2:42
6.	"On The Way"	Raghav Chaitanya, Akanksha Sethi	3:37
Total length:			21:16

== Release ==
Aabeer Gulaal, was initially scheduled for theatrical release on 9 May 2025. However, following the Pahalgam attack in April 2025, which resulted in significant casualties, the film's release faced substantial opposition. Indian government sources confirmed that the movie would not be allowed to release in India due to heightened political tensions between Pakistan and India and calls for a ban on Pakistani artists in Indian cinema. Subsequently, Pakistani authorities also decided to ban the film, citing the involvement of Indian actress Vaani Kapoor. The film released on 12 September 2025 in about 75 countries excluding India and Pakistan.
