= IIFA Award for Best Supporting Actor =

International Indian Film Academy Award

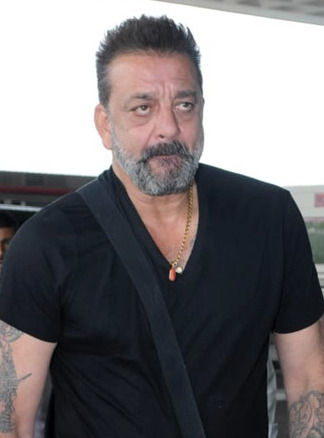
- The 2026 Recipient: Sanjay Dutt
- Awarded for: Best Performance by an Actor in a Supporting Role
- Country: India
- Presented by: International Indian Film Academy
- First award: Anil Kapoor, Taal (2000)
- Currently held by: Sanjay Dutt, Dhurandhar (2026)
- Website: http://www.iifa.com

The IIFA Award for Best Supporting Actor recognizes a male actor who has delivered an outstanding performance in a supporting role. The award is chosen by the viewers and the winner is announced at the ceremony. Anil Kapoor is leading with 4 wins.

== Superlatives ==
=== Multiple winners ===
- 4 Wins: Anil Kapoor
- 2 Wins: Saif Ali Khan, Abhishek Bachchan, Arjun Rampal

=== Multiple nominees ===
- 6 Nominations: Amitabh Bachchan
- 5 Nominations: Abhishek Bachchan, Nawazuddin Siddiqui, Anil Kapoor
- 4 Nominations: Irrfan Khan, Pankaj Tripathi
- 3 Nominations: Arshad Warsi, Mithun Chakraborty, Naseeruddin Shah, Anupam Kher, Saif Ali Khan
- 2 Nominations: Ashutosh Rana, Suniel Shetty, Paresh Rawal, Arjun Rampal, Emraan Hashmi, Saurabh Shukla, Randeep Hooda, Farhan Akhtar, Rajat Kapoor, Rishi Kapoo, Deepak Dobriyal, Rajkummar Rao, Abhishek Banerjee, Manoj Pahwa

Superlative	Actor	Record
Actor with most awards	Anil Kapoor	4
Actor with most nominations	Amitabh Bachchan	6
Actor with most nominations without ever winning	Mithun Chakraborty Naseeruddin Shah	3
Actor with most nominations in a single year	Nawazuddin Siddiqui (2013); Pankaj Tripathi (2022)	2

== List of winners ==
† – indicates the performance also won the Filmfare Award
‡ – indicates the performance was also nominated for the Filmfare Award

=== 2000s ===
- 2000 Anil Kapoor – Taal as Vikrant Kapoor †
- 2001 Amitabh Bachchan – Mohabbatein as Narayan Shankar †
  - Anupam Kher – Kya Kehna as Gulshan Baxi
  - Chandrachur Singh – Josh as Rahul
  - Paresh Rawal – Har Dil Jo Pyar Karega as Goverdhan
  - Sunil Shetty – Refugee as Ranger Mohammad Ashraf ‡
- 2002 Saif Ali Khan – Dil Chahta Hai as Sameer
  - Akshaye Khanna – Dil Chahta Hai as Siddharth Sinha †
  - Amitabh Bachchan – Kabhi Khushi Kabhie Gham as Yashvardhan Raichand ‡
  - Hrithik Roshan – Kabhi Khushi Kabhie Gham as Rohan Raichand ‡
  - Kulbhushan Kharbanda – Lagaan: Once Upon a Time in India as Rajah Puran Singh
- 2003 Mohanlal – Company as Srinivasan ‡
  - Ashutosh Rana – Raaz as Agni Swaroop
  - Dilip Prabhavalkar – Encounter: The Killing as Ponappa Awadhe
  - Jackie Shroff – Devdas as Chunnilal ‡
  - Sushant Singh – The Legend of Bhagat Singh as Sukhdev
- 2004 Saif Ali Khan – Kal Ho Naa Ho as Rohit Patel †
  - Arshad Warsi – Munna Bhai M.B.B.S. as Sarkeshwar (Circuit) ‡
  - Ashutosh Rana – LOC Kargil as Yogender Singh, 18 Grenadiers
  - Sunil Shetty – Qayamat: City Under Threat as Akram Sheikh
  - Yash Tonk – Janasheen as Max Pereira
- 2005 Abhishek Bachchan – Yuva as Lallan Singh †
  - Amitabh Bachchan – Veer-Zaara as Choudhary Sumer Singh‡
  - Pankaj Kapur – Maqbool as Jahangir Khan (Abbaji)
  - Paresh Rawal – Aitraaz as Advocate Patel
  - Zayed Khan – Main Hoon Na as Lakshman Prasad Sharma a.k.a. Lucky ‡
- 2006 Abhishek Bachchan – Sarkar as Shankar Nagre †
  - Amitabh Bachchan – Bunty Aur Babli as Dashrath Singh ‡
  - John Abraham – Garam Masala as Shyam "Sam"
  - Naseeruddin Shah – Iqbal as Mohit ‡
  - Sanjay Dutt – Parineeta as Girish ‡
- 2007 Arshad Warsi – Lage Raho Munna Bhai as Circuit (Sarkeshwar)
  - Amitabh Bachchan – Kabhi Alvida Naa Kehna as Samarjit 'Sam' Talwar ‡
  - Abhishek Bachchan – Kabhi Alvida Naa Kehna as Rishi Talwar †
  - Atul Kulkarni – Rang De Basanti as Laxman Pandey / Ramprasad Bismil
  - Kunal Kapoor – Rang De Basanti as Aslam / Ashfaqullah Khan ‡
- 2008 Irrfan Khan – Life in a... Metro as Monty †
  - Anil Kapoor – Welcome as Sagar Pandey (Majnu) ‡
  - Govinda – Partner as Bhaskar Devkar Chaudhary
  - Mithun Chakraborty – Guru as Manik Dasgupta ‡
  - Rajat Kapoor – Bheja Fry as Ranjeet Thadani
- 2009 Arjun Rampal – Rock On!! as Joe Mascarenhas †
  - Abhishek Bachchan – Sarkar Raj as Shankar Nagare ‡
  - Irrfan Khan – Mumbai Meri Jaan as Thomas
  - Sonu Sood – Jodhaa Akbar as Rajkumar Sujamal ‡
  - Vinay Pathak – Rab Ne Bana Di Jodi as Balwinder "Bobby" Khosla ‡

=== 2010s ===
- 2010 Sharman Joshi – 3 Idiots as Raju Rastogi ‡
  - Abhimanyu Singh – Gulaal as Rananjay Singh "Ransa"
  - Abhishek Bachchan – Paa as Amol Arte
  - Irrfan Khan – New York as Roshan
  - R. Madhavan – 3 Idiots as Farhan Qureshi ‡
  - Rishi Kapoor – Love Aaj Kal as Veer Singh
- 2011 Arjun Rampal – Raajneeti as Prithviraj Pratap ‡
  - Arshad Warsi – Ishqiya as Razzak Hussain ‡
  - Emraan Hashmi – Once Upon a Time in Mumbaai as Shoaib Khan ‡
  - Manoj Bajpayee – Raajneeti as Virendra Pratap ‡
  - Mithun Chakraborty – Golmaal 3 as Pritam
- 2012 Farhan Akhtar – Zindagi Na Milegi Dobara as Imran †
  - Abhay Deol – Zindagi Na Milegi Dobara as Kabir ‡
  - Emraan Hashmi – The Dirty Picture as Abraham
  - Naseeruddin Shah – The Dirty Picture as Suryakant ‡
  - Randeep Hooda – Saheb, Biwi Aur Gangster as Lalit/Babloo
- 2013 Annu Kapoor – Vicky Donor as Dr. Baldev Chaddha †
  - Akshay Kumar – OMG – Oh My God! as Krishna Vasudev Yadav ‡
  - Mithun Chakraborty – OMG – Oh My God! as Leeladhar Swamy
  - Nawazuddin Siddiqui – Gangs of Wasseypur – Part 1 as Faizal Khan
  - Nawazuddin Siddiqui – Talaash: The Answer Lies Within as Taimur ‡
  - Saurabh Shukla – Barfi! as Sudhanshu Dutta
- 2014 Aditya Roy Kapur – Yeh Jawaani Hai Deewani as Avinash "Avi" Arora ‡
  - Anupam Kher – Special 26 as P.K. Sharma ‡
  - Nawazuddin Siddiqui – The Lunchbox as Shaikh †
  - Pawan Malhotra – Bhaag Milkha Bhaag as Hawaldar (Constable) Gurudev Singh
  - Saurabh Shukla – Jolly LLB as Justice Tripathi
- 2015 Riteish Deshmukh – Ek Villain as Rakesh Mahadkar ‡
  - Inaamulhaq – Filmistaan as Aftab
  - Kay Kay Menon – Haider as Khurram Meer †
  - Naseeruddin Shah – Finding Fanny as Ferdinand "Ferdie" Pinto
  - Randeep Hooda – Kick as Himanshu Tyagi
  - Ronit Roy – 2 States as Vikram Malhotra (Krish's father) ‡
- 2016 Anil Kapoor – Dil Dhadakne Do as Kamal Mehra †
  - Deepak Dobriyal – Tanu Weds Manu Returns as Pappi ‡
  - Farhan Akhtar – Dil Dhadakne Do as Sunny Gill
  - Irrfan Khan – Piku as Rana Chaudhary
  - Nawazuddin Siddiqui – Bajrangi Bhaijaan as Chand Nawab
- 2017 Anupam Kher – M.S. Dhoni: The Untold Story as Pan Singh
  - Amitabh Bachchan – Wazir as Pandit Omkar Nath Dar
  - Rajat Kapoor – Kapoor & Sons as Harsh Kapoor ‡
  - Rajkummar Rao – Aligarh as Deepu Sebastian ‡
  - Rishi Kapoor – Kapoor & Sons as Amarjeet Kapoor †
- 2018 Nawazuddin Siddiqui – Mom as Daya Shankar "DK" Kapoor ‡
  - Deepak Dobriyal – Hindi Medium as Shyamprakash Kori ‡
  - Pankaj Tripathi – Newton as Assistant Commandant Aatma Singh ‡
  - Rajkummar Rao – Bareilly Ki Barfi as Pritam Vidrohi †
  - Vijay Maurya – Tumhari Sulu as Pankaj Rai Baaghi
- 2019 Vicky Kaushal – Sanju as Kamlesh Kanhaiyalal Kapasi †
  - Anil Kapoor – Race 3 as Shamsher Singh
  - Jim Sarbh – Padmaavat as Malik Kafur ‡
  - Manoj Pahwa – Mulk as Bilaal Ali Mohammed ‡
  - Pankaj Tripathi – Stree as Rudra ‡

=== 2020s ===
- 2022 Pankaj Tripathi – Ludo as Satyendra "Sattu Bhaiya" Tripathi ‡
  - Jiiva – 83 as Krishnamachari Srikkanth
  - Kumud Mishra – Thappad as Sachin Sandhu ‡
  - Pankaj Tripathi – 83 as PR Man Singh ‡
  - Saif Ali Khan – Tanhaji as Udaybhan Singh Rathore †
- 2023 Anil Kapoor – Jugjugg Jeeyo as Bheem Saini †
  - Abhishek Banerjee – Bhediya as Janardan "Jana" / JD
  - Shah Rukh Khan – Brahmāstra: Part One – Shiva as Mohan Bhargav
  - Sikandar Kher – Monica, O My Darling as Nishikant Adhikari
  - Vijay Raaz – Gangubai Kathiawadi as Raziabai
- 2024 Anil Kapoor – Animal as Balbir Singh / Kailash Petkar ‡
  - Dharmendra – Rocky Aur Rani Kii Prem Kahaani as Kanwal Lund
  - Gajraj Rao – Satyaprem Ki Katha as Narayan
  - Jaideep Ahlawat – An Action Hero as Bhoora Singh Solanki ‡
  - Tota Roy Chowdhury – Rocky Aur Rani Kii Prem Kahaani as Chandon Chatterjee
- 2025 Ravi Kishan – Laapataa Ladies as Shyam Manohar
  - Abhishek Banerjee – Stree 2 – Sarkate Ka Aatank as Jana
  - Fardeen Khan – Khel Khel Mein as Kabir Deshmukh
  - Manoj Pahwa – Jigra as Shekhar Bhatia
  - Rajpal Yadav – Bhool Bhulaiyaa 3 as Natwar "Chhote Pandit"

== See also ==
- IIFA Awards
- Bollywood
- Cinema of India
