= Ashok Mehta =

Indian film cinematographer

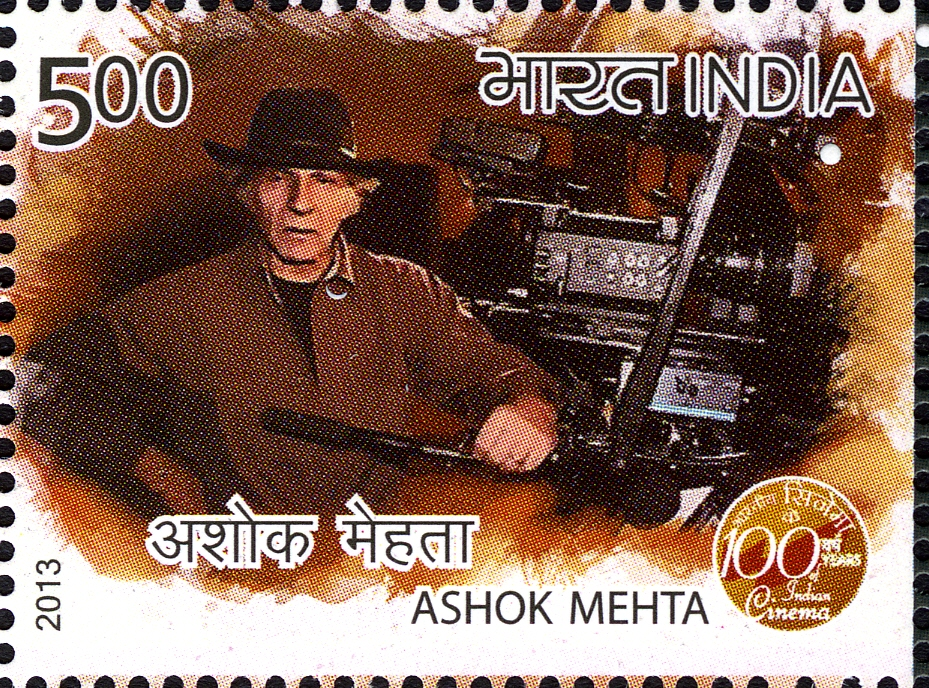
- Ashok Mehta on a 2013 stamp of India
- Born: 1946/47; Punjab, India
- Died: 15 August 2012 (aged 65); Mumbai, Maharashtra, India
- Occupation: cinematographer
- Years active: 1978–2011

Ashok Mehta (1946/47 – 15 August 2012) was an Indian film cinematographer, known for films such as Bandit Queen (1994), 36 Chowringhee Lane (1981) and Utsav (1984). He won the National Film Award for Best Cinematography twice, 36 Chowringhee Lane (1981) and Moksha (2000), the latter he also directed.

== Early life and career ==
Ashok Mehta's journey is a rags to riches story. He ran away from home at the age of 14 and came to Mumbai. With no money, no acquaintance and no shelter he had nowhere to go and to survive he started selling stuff like boiled eggs, fruits etc. His Journey in the Bollywood started as a canteen boy, office boy and then a camera attendant. After a decade-long struggle in the Indian film industry, he finally became the DOP. He got his first break as a cinematographer at the age of 25 in Raj Marbros' The Witness. He credits his actual career boost to the reigning star of the 1970s, Shashi Kapoor. Kapoor, who was starring in a film being shot by Mehta, was greatly impressed by his work and even though the film did not get made eventually, it won Mehta the favor of Kapoor, who offered him his next production, 36 Chowringhee Lane. The next step for Mehta was to establish himself in mainstream cinema and this opportunity came through actress Rakhee. It was during the filming of Paroma that Rakhee got acquainted with Mehta and his work, but it was years later when Subhash Ghai, leading director of the popular film scene, was on the lookout for a cameraman for his mega-project Ram Lakhan, that she suggested the name of Mehta. Ashok Mehta then stepped onto the popular film scene and with the collaboration of Ghai, brought to popular cinema an altogether different style of lighting and shot taking. He is lovingly known as the "guiding light" in Bollywood.

== Death ==
Early in 2012, he was diagnosed with lung cancer. While he was getting treated for lung cancer, he was diagnosed with brain tumor. Despite the surgery and cancer, he never stopped working as movies and cinematography was his passion and first love. He died from cancer in Mumbai on 15 August 2012, at the age of 64.

== Filmography ==
Director

- Moksha (2000)

Cinematographer

- The Witness
- Hamare Tumhare (1979)
- 36 Chowringhee Lane (1981)
- Mandi (1983)
- Paroma (1984)
- Utsav (1984)
- Andar Baahar (1984)
- Trikaal (1985)
- Susman (1987)
- Ijaazat (1987)
- Ram Lakhan (1989)
- Sati (1989)
- Saudagar (1991)
- Khalnayak (1993)
- Bandit Queen (1994)
- Trimurti (1995)
- Gupt (1997)
- Pukar (2000)
- Gaja Gamini (2000)
- Dr. Babasaheb Ambedkar (2000)
- Moksha (2000)
- Aankhen (2002)
- Dil Ka Rishta (2003)
- Chalte Chalte (2003)
- Kisna: The Warrior Poet (2005)
- No Entry (2005)
- Waqt (2005)
- Family (2006)
- I See You (2006)
- God Tussi Great Ho (2008)
- Mehbooba (2008)
- Shortkut (2009)
- Hum Tum Aur Ghost (2010)
- Teen Thay Bhai (2011)

== Personal life ==
Ashok Mehta lived with his wife Neerja Mehta and his son Ved Mehta.

== Awards ==
- National Film Award for Best Cinematography:
  - 1981: 36 Chowringhee Lane
  - 2000: Moksha
- Filmfare Award for Best Cinematography
  - 1997: Bandit Queen
