= Yakeen (2005 film) =

2005 Indian film by Girish Dhamija

- Theatrical release poster
- Directed by: Girish Dhamija
- Written by: Vikram Bhatt; Girish Dhamija
- Produced by: Sujit Kumar Singh
- Starring: Arjun Rampal; Priyanka Chopra
- Cinematography: Anshuman Mahaley
- Edited by: Kuldeep Mehan
- Music by: Himesh Reshammiya
- Distributed by: Shreya Creations; P R Films
- Release date: 1 July 2005
- Running time: 116 minutes
- Country: India
- Language: Hindi

Yakeen (Translation: Trust) is a 2005 Indian Hindi-language romantic mystery thriller film co-written and directed by Girish Dhamija, starring Arjun Rampal, and Priyanka Chopra while Kim Sharma, Sudhanshu Pandey, and Saurabh Shukla play supporting roles. The film's screenplay was written by Vikram Bhatt. The film's plot is loosely inspired by the 1991 American film Shattered. The film's premise centres around a man who recovers from an accident with amnesia, and as he starts to piece together his former life, he feels that something is wrong.

== Plot ==
The film begins with the recovery of Simar and her husband Nikhil from a car accident. Simar comes out unscathed, while Nikhil suffers most of the physical damage along with psychogenic amnesia. Simar is confident he will heal and resume his life. She brings in the best surgeons to reconstruct his damaged leg and face and helps him with his physiotherapy.

Although Nikhil is at first cautious, Simar's love and dedication win him over. After six months of therapy, he is discharged from the hospital, and the couple returns home. However, when Nikhil meets up with his old friends and goes through his personal files, he finds evidence that all was not well in his previous life. Now uncertain of his wife's true intentions, he starts retracing his steps from the night of the accident, meeting with his friend Tanya, who tells him that on the night of the accident, he had planned to divorce Simar for infidelity on her part.

Nikhil hires a private investigator named Chamanlal, who discovers that the accusation is true: Simar had been having an affair with a man named "Kabir." Nikhil secretly overhears Simar talking on the phone with Kabir, in which she insists their relationship is over because she has fallen back in love with Nikhil. She agrees to meet Kabir one last time. Nikhil follows Simar to a secluded house, where he witnesses an argument between Simar and Kabir. After a chase through the woods, it is revealed that Simar staged the entire thing: Kabir was never on the phone nor in the house because he has been dead the entire time. Simar confesses that on the night of the accident, Nikhil had found Simar and Kabir together, and in his rage, he killed Kabir. Simar wanted to protect Nikhil from the guilt and believed his amnesia had been a chance to start their relationship anew. Nikhil believes this and reconciles with Simar.

Tanya contacts Nikhil with new information, but he finds her shot dead. He informs Chamanlal that he has been having vivid flashbacks to the night of the accident and has an idea where Kabir was buried. They drive out and dig up the body, which has been preserved in the snow. The corpse's face is exactly the same as Nikhil's.

"Nikhil" realises that he is in fact Kabir and had been the one having an affair with Simar. It is revealed that the real Nikhil was emotionally abusive toward Simar. Kabir saw Simar being abandoned by Nikhil at a party one night, and they began their affair, but after a while, Simar became obsessed with him. On the night of the accident, Kabir had been trying to leave Simar, who threatened to commit suicide if he did. Nikhil had arrived and started a fight with Kabir, which ended when Simar killed Nikhil with her gun. They buried the body in the snow, but on the way back, Kabir blamed Simar for the murder and declared that they should go to the police. In the ensuing argument, Kabir lost control of the car, which resulted in the accident that changed everything.

In the present, Kabir is angry that his identity has been robbed by Simar, who took advantage of his amnesia and ordered plastic surgeons to reconstruct his face like Nikhil's. He and Chamanlal decide to bring Nikhil's body to the police but are stopped when Simar shoots Chamanlal. She still wants Kabir to accept Nikhil's identity so they can be together, but Kabir refuses. Simar tries to kill them both so they can be together in death; Kabir escapes, but Simar does not.

The final scene is of Kabir arriving at the police station, carrying Nikhil's corpse with him. The end credits begin over footage of Kabir explaining his story and confessing the truth to the police officers.

== Cast ==
- Arjun Rampal as Nikhil Oberoi / Kabir Malhotra
- Priyanka Chopra as Simar Oberoi
- Sudhanshu Pandey as Kabir Malhotra
- Kim Sharma as Tanya Thakur
- Ankur Nayyar as Siddharth Thakur
- Saurabh Shukla as Chamanlal
- Anang Desai as Dr. Kapadia

== Production ==
The film was announced in 2003 with Priyanka Chopra in lead.

== Soundtrack ==
Yakeen

Soundtrack album by Himesh Reshammiya
- Released: 16 May 2005
- Venue: Mumbai
- Genre: Feature film soundtrack
- Label: T-Series
- Producer: Himesh Reshammiya

Himesh Reshammiya chronology
Main Aisa Hi Hoon (2005)	Yakeen (2005)	Silsiilay (2005)

The music is composed by Himesh Reshammiya with the lyrics written by Sameer. The album has eight tracks, including one instrumental and two reprise tracks.

=== Track listing ===
No.	Title	Artist(s)	Length
1	"Tune Mujhko"	Udit Narayan, Alka Yagnik	6:19
2	"Meri Aankhon Mein"	Udit Narayan, Alka Yagnik	6:29
3	"Tu Hi"	Sonu Nigam, Shreya Ghoshal	6:02
4	"Bhoolna Nahin"	Shaan, Sunidhi Chauhan	6:19
5	"Chehra Tera"	Sonu Nigam, Alka Yagnik	5:38
6	"Meri Aankhon Mein"	Instrumental	6:29
7	"Bhoolna Nahin - II"	Sunidhi Chauhan	5:04
8	"Bhoolna Nahin - III"	Shaan	6:15

== Reception ==
Taran Adarsh of IndiaFM gave the film 2 out of 5, writing, "On the whole, YAKEEN could've been a taut edge of the seat thriller, which it isn't thanks to its not-too-happening post-interval portions." Patcy N of Rediff.com called the film "entertaining yet very predictable." She further wrote that the "movie starts well but tends to drag later. The end, though predictable, is very dramatic."

Jaspreet Pandohar of BBC.com wrote, "Sticking closely to its American predecessor, Yakeen races along, delivering twist after turn until it reaches its devastating climax. Rampal and Chopra also deliver convincing performances as the traumatised husband and wife, proving they are more than just pretty faces. But Yakeen still doesn't entirely impress: as the umpteenth Hollywood-Bollywood remake to be released this year, there clearly isn't an original bone in its entire body."
