= Aankhen (2002 film) =

2002 Indian film by Vipul Shah

- Theatrical release poster
- Directed by: Vipul Amrutlal Shah
- Screenplay by: Aatish Kapadia; Vipul Amrutlal Shah
- Story by: Aatish Kapadia; Vipul Amrutlal Shah; Shobhana Desai
- Produced by: Gaurang Doshi
- Starring: Amitabh Bachchan; Akshay Kumar; Arjun Rampal; Sushmita Sen; Paresh Rawal; Aditya Pancholi
- Cinematography: Ashok Mehta
- Edited by: Shirish Kunder
- Music by: Jatin–Lalit; Aadesh Shrivastava; Nitin Raikwar
- Production companies: V R Films; Gaurang Doshi Productions
- Distributed by: Shemaroo Entertainment
- Release date: 5 April 2002
- Running time: 165 minutes
- Country: India
- Language: Hindi
- Budget: ₹17 crore
- Box office: ₹33.8 crore

Aankhen (transl. Eyes) is a 2002 Indian Hindi-language heist crime thriller film directed by Vipul Amrutlal Shah. The film stars Amitabh Bachchan, Akshay Kumar, Arjun Rampal, Sushmita Sen, Paresh Rawal and Aditya Pancholi. The film is an adaptation of Shah's own Gujarati stage play Andhalo Pato (transl. Blindman's Buff).

The film tells the story of Vijay Singh Rajput (Bachchan) a hard-working but temperamental man, who has spent all his life working for a bank. When he is unlawfully fired, he decides to take vengeance by organizing a heist, and having the bank robbed by three blind men (Kumar, Rampal and Rawal), as no one will suspect them.

Aankhen had its worldwide premiere in Malaysia at the 3rd IIFA Awards ceremony on 5 April 2002. Upon release, Aankhen was praised for its concept, story line and direction. It turned out to be the fifth highest-grossing Hindi film of the year.

== Plot ==
Obsessive, temperamental, and schizophrenic bank manager Vijay Singh Rajput loses his job for badly beating up a bank clerk who tried to embezzle money. Enraged, he plots revenge on the bank by intending to stage a heist. He employs three blind men. Vishwas, a person who, after becoming blind in an accident, gains a powerful sixth sense, and Ellyaas and Arjun when, after passing by school for the blind, he understands that blind people can be trained to do things like sighted people. He blackmails and enlists the help of Neha, who is a teacher at the school, to train the trio to do the seemingly impossible heist. He chooses blind people because they, as thieves, would never be suspected, as no one would believe blind people can rob a bank.

The bank robbery is successful, with the jewels safely captured by the three. However, in the process of robbing the bank, Ellyaas' face is exposed by a nearby civilian, captured in footage and prompting citywide posters with his face. Meanwhile, Mr. Rajput anxiously tries to extort information from Vishwas and Arjun regarding the jewels and their location. Unable to answer, as they did not collect the items, they try to defer the answer by changing subjects. Ultimately, it is revealed that Ellyaas is the one with complete knowledge of the box's belongings. Meanwhile, tensions rise between Rajput and Neha; the latter resists the abusive nature of Rajput and his obnoxious harassment of Vishwas and Arjun. Arjun confesses his love to Neha, who reveals that she is associated in the plot only for the well-being of her younger brother, Rahul, who has been kidnapped by Rajput, and she cannot kill him even if she has any weapon in her hand.

In a furious attempt, the police try to locate Illyaas. Illyaas lands up at Rajput's place after getting drunk. Rajput tries several ways to force Illyaas into revealing the location of the box. Unable to generate an answer, he slams Illyaas, who falls on the ground and injures his eyes, causing bleeding. Even in this scenario, Rajput tries to get the information, but Vishwas and Arjun resist and claim that they will reveal the location if Illyaas is treated by paramedics. Rajput sends them to get Dr. Siddiqui. When both go to Shamim Street to get Dr. Siddiqui, Vishwas senses that Illyaas is in danger, and Arjun and Vishwas double back to the training center to save him. Rajput starts to harass Illyaas by tickling him to force him to reveal the answer. In the action, Illyaas falls off the balcony and dies. Unable to bear the shock of the death, Neha pulls a gun on Rajput and threatens to reveal everything to the police if he does not leave her and the other two alone. Rajput notifies Neha that all these acts were done under her training, and he is spotless, and that until Neha is alive, nothing can happen to him. Realizing that she has to die in order to save Arjun and Vishwas, Neha shoots herself, just as both of them return after hearing loud screams.

Both men gang up on Rajput and try to attack him. Once Rajput realises that only Illyaas knew where the jewellery was, he starts shooting them and tries to kill them. The police arrive, and confusion ensues. Vishwas and Arjun come out and claim that Rajput is abusing them while he claims that there is a big conspiracy involving the two people, Neha and Illyaas. Unable to believe that blind men can ransack a bank, and amidst Rajput's impassioned defence, the police start getting suspicious. In the heat of defending himself, Rajput reveals that he sent over Illyaas, thus confessing his crime.

In the end, Rajput has been locked away. Vishwas and Arjun decide to take care of Rahul and ultimately find the jewels – they were hidden in Illyaas' harmonium.

=== Alternate ending ===
In an alternate ending for overseas viewers Rajput bribes the cop and is set free, in return to get him his share and gets his manager Bhandari arrested. Vishwas and Arjun are sitting in a train (waiting for it to depart) and Rajput is standing on the platform with a smile on his face. He then warns them that "A dangerous game is about to begin", after which Vishwas and Arjun both draw their guns, and the film ends.

== Cast ==
- Amitabh Bachchan as Vijay Singh Rajput
- Akshay Kumar as Vishwas Prajapati
- Arjun Rampal as Arjun Verma
- Sushmita Sen as Neha Srivastav
- Paresh Rawal as Ilyaas
- Aditya Pancholi as ACP Raj Thakur
- Arun Bali as Sanjay Goenka
- Ajit Vachani as Pranab Bhandari
- Bipasha Basu as Naina (special appearance)
- Malvika Singh as Delnaz
- Shreyas Talpade as Mushtaq (Chaiwallah / Tea seller on railway station)
- Paresh Ganatra as Sailesh
- Daya Shankar Pandey as Taxi Driver Mewaram
- Smith Seth as Rahul Srivastav, Neha's brother
- Kashmera Shah in a special appearance in song "Chalka Chalka"

== Production ==
The film's working title was "All The Best" but was later changed for numerology reasons and to better suit Indian audiences. Originally Raveena Tandon was cast for the role of Neha, but she was unexpectedly dropped and was replaced by Sushmita Sen. Sen in turn made a lot of preparations for her role as a teacher to the blind. She visited schools for the blind and interacted with the students for a more-realistic feel to her role. Akshaye Khanna was the original choice for the role of Arjun Verma, however, things did not work out after he rejected the role. Saif Ali Khan was also approached to play the role, however, he was busy with Kal Ho Naa Ho (2003) after Salman Khan declined the role of Rohit because he did not wish to "play second fiddle" to Shah Rukh Khan like he previously did in Kuch Kuch Hota Hai (1998). Thereafter, Arjun Rampal, was cast in the role.

Vipul Shah once tickled his nephew to such an extent that he became breathless. This gave Vipul Shah an idea to tickle uncontrollably the character-Iliyas so that his life could be lost.

== Reception ==
Aankhen opened well at the Indian box office. The film made ₹ 338 million net altogether. It was also the fifth-highest-grossing Bollywood film of 2002. The film was also a success in South Africa, opening to packed houses and grossing $14,600 on the weekend, despite a limited release.

== Soundtrack ==
Aankhen

Studio album by Aadesh Shrivastav Jatin–Lalit
- Genre: Feature film soundtrack
- Label: Universal Music India

The soundtrack was composed by Aadesh Shrivastav and Jatin–Lalit. Lyrics were penned by Prasoon Joshi, Praveen Bharadwaj and Nitin Raikwar. The song “Gustakhiyan” is used for the early TV commercials of Honda Unicorn.

=== Track listing ===
No.	Title	Artist(s)	Composer	Lyricist(s)
1.	"Amitabh Soliloquy"	Amitabh Bachchan	Aadesh Shrivastava	Aatish Kapadia conceived by Vipul Amrutlal Shah
2.	"Gustakhiyan"	Aadesh Shrivastava and Vasundhara Das	Aadesh Shrivastava	Prasoon Joshi
3.	"Kuchh Kasme"	Sonu Nigam and Alka Yagnik	Jatin–Lalit	Praveen Bhardwaj
4.	Theme Song	Remo Fernandes	Jatin–Lalit	N/A
5.	"Phatela Jeb"	Arun Bakshi, Aadesh Shrivastava and Nitin Raikwar	Aadesh Shrivastava	Nitin Raikwar
6.	"Chalka Chalka"	Alka Yagnik and Javed	Jatin–Lalit	Praveen Bhardwaj
7.	"Nazron Ne Teri"	Kavita Krishnamurthy and Udit Narayan	Jatin–Lalit	Praveen Bhardwaj
8.	"All The Best"	Remo Fernandes	Jatin–Lalit	Praveen Bhardwaj
9.	Title Song	Remo Fernandes and Sonu Nigam	Aadesh Shrivastava	Prasoon Joshi

== Accolades ==
48th Filmfare Awards:

Category	Nominees	Results
Best Supporting Actor	Amitabh Bachchan	Nominated
Best Comedian	Paresh Rawal	Nominated

9th Annual Screen Awards:

Category	Nominees	Results
Best Film	Aankhen	Nominated
Best Comedian	Paresh Rawal	Nominated
Best Villain	Amitabh Bachchan	Nominated

== Controversy ==
Aankhen broiled into controversy when producer Doshi did not give the director Shah any credit on the film's DVD. The fallout began between the two on the sets, after a number of creative differences, which led to allegations of plagiarism and counter-allegations. The DVD's front cover had Doshi's name on it and the back had the director's name as Vipul Doshi instead of Vipul Shah. Shah took legal action against Doshi, who refused to take responsibility for the director's missing credit.

=== Copycat crimes ===
Between 2004/05, two bank robberies occurred on Mira Road in Maharashtra by a man named Feroz Sheikh and several accomplices, who were said to have been inspired by the film. The robbers took several lakh rupees (100,000), and planned to use it to start a business. The culprits were eventually nabbed but not all the money was recovered.

== Video game ==
A computer game based on film was created for promotional purposes in a tie in with IndiaFM and Hungama.com (now collectively known as Bollywood Hungama). It was launched at the IIFA press conference on 14 March 2002.

== Sequel ==
The sequel was first announced in 2006 and has been in production since shortly after the release on Aankhen. The director Shah was dropped due to differences with producer Doshi, and directing duties were taken over by Sachin. On 19 March 2016 in an interview with Anees Bazmee about his film No Entry Mein Entry, Anees stated that he is working on a script for Aankhen 2. In March 2019 Bazmee confirmed that the cast for the film has been finalized. Saif Ali Khan and Jacqueline Fernandez were roped in to play the leads apart from Amitabh Bachchan.

The film eventually passed on to director Abhinay Deo, who in 2023 confirmed that the film had been officially shelved after Bachchan opted out of the sequel.
