= I See You (2006 film) =

2006 Indian film by Vivek Agrawal

- Theatrical release poster
- Directed by: Vivek Agrawal
- Screenplay by: Suresh Nair
- Dialogues by: Niranjan Iyengar
- Story by: Vivek Agarwal
- Produced by: Mehr Jesia; K. Sera Sera; Satish Panchariya
- Starring: Arjun Rampal; Vipasha Agarwal; Chunky Pandey; Sonali Kulkarni; Boman Irani; Kirron Kher
- Cinematography: Ashok Mehta
- Edited by: Dilip Ahuja
- Music by: Vishal–Shekhar
- Distributed by: Chasing Ganesha Films; K Sera Sera
- Release date: 29 December 2006
- Country: India
- Language: Hindi
- Budget: ₹80 million
- Box office: ₹19.2 million

I See You is a 2006 Indian Hindi-language romantic comedy film directed by Vivek Agrawal and produced by Mehr Jesia. The film stars Arjun Rampal and Vipasha Agarwal. Chunky Pandey, Sonali Kulkarni, Sophie Chaudhary, Boman Irani and Kirron Kher play supporting roles.

The film was filmed in London and was released on 29 December 2006. Based on the novel If Only It Were True (Et si c'était vrai...) by Marc Levy, it also has elements from the Malayalam film Vismayathumbathu, and from the 2005 American film Just Like Heaven, which were both also based on the same novel.

== Plot ==
Raj Jaiswal is the TV host of his own talk show, British Raj and is also a notorious womanizer. He promises to marry every woman he flirts with, however, secretly, he has sworn to stay a bachelor forever. One day, he meets a mysterious woman, Shivani Dutt on his balcony who claims that his apartment is actually hers. Raj is instantly smitten with her. However, it turns out that he is the only one who can see her and touch her. To everyone else, it seems as if he talks to himself and is slowly going mental. His friends tell Raj to let go, but Raj refuses, as he has fallen in love with the ghost woman. He finds out that Shivani is actually lying in a hospital in a coma, and her life support is about to be cut off. Raj decides to save her and brings her comatose body to his apartment to look after it. Shivani's doctor wants to kill her as she has witnessed an illegal operation where a kidney was removed, and the doctor wants to save himself. Shivani finally admits that she has fallen in love with Raj, but Inspector Smith is on his trail and finally finds out what happened to Shivani's body - and also discovers the doctor's organ trafficking. Soon afterward, Shivani awakens from her coma and doesn't remember Raj or the time she has spent with him as a ghost at all. Raj, disappointed, leaves her at the hospital and decides to get to know her anew: he finds her at a restaurant and introduces himself.

== Cast ==
- Arjun Rampal as Raj Jaiswal
- Vipasha Agarwal as Shivani Dutt
- Chunky Pandey as Akshay Kapoor
- Boman Irani as Dr. Omi Patnaik (special appearance)
- Kirron Kher as Mrs. Dutt
- Sonali Kulkarni as Kuljeet (special appearance)
- Sophie Chaudhary as Dilnaaz Bagga
- Michael Maloney as Inspector Johnny Smith
- Hilary Hodsman as Florist Michelle
- Hrithik Roshan (special appearance in the song "Subah Subah")
- Shahrukh Khan (special appearance in the song "Subah Subah")

== Soundtrack ==
I See You

Soundtrack album by Vishal–Shekhar
- Released: 21 September 2006 (Digital Release); 29 December 2006 (Film Release)
- Genre: Feature film soundtrack
- Label: Eros
- Producers: Arjun Rampal; Mehr Jesia Rampal

Vishal–Shekhar chronology
Golmaal (2006)	I See You (2006)	Honeymoon Travels Pvt. Ltd. (2007)

All lyrics are written by Vishal Dadlani; all music is composed by Vishal-Shekhar.

Track listing
No.	Title	Singer(s)	Length
1.	"Subah Subah"	Zubeen Garg, Vishal Dadlani & Shekhar Ravjiani	05:46
2.	"Kehna Hai Jo"	Shekhar Ravjiani	04:32
3.	"Sach Hui"	Sunidhi Chauhan	05:01
4.	"Halo Halo"	Vishal Dadlani, Sukhwinder Singh & Sunidhi Chauhan	05:29
5.	"Halo Hall" (remix; remixed By DJ Whosane)	Vishal Dadlani, Sukhwinder Singh & Sunidhi Chauhan	05:17
6.	"Subah Subah" (remix; remixed By DJ Whosane)	Zubeen Garg, Vishal Dadlani & Shekhar Ravjiani	05:23

== Reception ==
Priyanka Jain of Rediff.com gave the film 2.5 out of 5, stating "I See You is watchable, as long as you do not expect anything much from it." Poonam Joshi of BBC.com wrote "With such lacklustre performances, the end product is amateurish and tedious. I See You could well leave you in much the same state as its lead character. Comatose." Taran Adarsh of Bollywood Hungama gave the film 1.5 out of 5, writing, "On the whole, I SEE YOU could've been an interesting fare, but is letdown by a lopsided screenplay. At the box-office, the lack of face-value and an inopportune release period [people don't like to spend New Year in a cinema hall] will only add to its woes."
