= Dil Ka Rishta =

2003 Indian film by Naresh Malhotra

- Directed by: Naresh Malhotra
- Written by: Shabbir Boxwala; Vrinda Rai
- Produced by: Shabbir Boxwala; Aditya Rai
- Starring: Raakhee; Aishwarya Rai; Arjun Rampal; Isha Koppikar; Paresh Rawal; Priyanshu Chatterjee; Tiku Talsania
- Cinematography: Ashok Mehta
- Edited by: Naresh Malhotra
- Music by: Nadeem–Shravan
- Production companies: Target Films; Tips Industries
- Distributed by: Tips Industries
- Release date: 17 January 2003
- Running time: 151 minutes
- Country: India
- Language: Hindi
- Budget: ₹8.25 crore
- Box office: ₹14.6 crore

Dil Ka Rishta (English: Relationship of the heart) is a 2003 Indian Hindi-language romance film directed by Naresh Malhotra. It was produced by Aditya Rai and Shabbir Boxwala under Target Films and Tips Industries Limited. The film stars Raakhee, Aishwarya Rai, and Arjun Rampal, with Priyanshu Chatterjee, Isha Koppikar, Paresh Rawal, and Tiku Talsania in supporting roles. The music is composed by Nadeem–Shravan, with the lyrics written by Sameer.

== Plot ==
Jai is a wealthy young man who supports numerous charities. While accompanying his friend Anita to a school for the deaf that he sponsors, he meets Tia, a teacher, and falls in love with her. Believing his feelings to be reciprocated, he attempts to court her, but Tia regards him only as a friend. When Jai confesses his love, Tia reveals that she is engaged to Raj. Despite knowing this, Jai continues pursuing her until she angrily rejects him. Tia subsequently marries Raj, and they have a son, Anshu. Although they live in poverty, they are happy together, while Jai is left heartbroken.

One night, Jai becomes heavily intoxicated and drives home with Anita. Their car collides with another vehicle carrying Tia and Raj. Anita and Raj are killed, while Tia survives but loses her memory.

Tia's doctors believe that recovering her memories would cause her severe psychological distress. They advise her mother to take her somewhere free from reminders of her past. Overwhelmed by guilt for causing the accident, Jai offers Tia and her mother his house in South Africa, where Tia can recuperate. Although she despises Jai for his role in the accident, Tia's mother accepts his offer for her daughter's sake. Tia is told that she was involved in an accident with Jai and Anita, her best friends, and that Anshu is the son of Jai and Anita. She is also led to believe that she has always cared for Anshu as his aunt and is encouraged to continue acting as a motherly figure in his life.

In South Africa, Tia's mother notices that her daughter is developing feelings for Jai and warns him against encouraging them. Consumed by self-loathing, Jai keeps his distance despite Tia's attempts to befriend him. Jai's father tries to bring them together, but Jai refuses, although he still loves her. Eventually, Tia's mother realises that she wants Tia and Anshu to have a complete family life. Accepting her daughter's feelings for Jai, she gives the couple her blessing. However, Jai's guilt over the accident prevents him from pursuing a relationship with Tia.

Frustrated by his continued rejection, Tia confronts Jai about his behaviour, and they argue. She runs away, and Jai follows her. When Tia threatens to take her own life, Jai finally reveals the truth: Anshu is her son, Anita was his friend, and Raj, Tia's husband, also died in the accident.

The film concludes with a confrontation involving all the characters, as Jai's father and Tia's mother arrive. Tia forgives Jai, believing the accident to have been her destiny, since she cannot remember her past. She announces her intention to leave and begin a new life with her mother and Anshu. Jai asks her to marry him, and she accepts.

== Cast ==
- Aishwarya Rai as Tia Sharma
- Arjun Rampal as Jai Mehta
- Priyanshu Chatterjee as Raj Sharma
- Raakhee as Mrinalini Sharma, Tia's mother
- Isha Koppikar as Anita
- Paresh Rawal as Harshavardhan Mehta, Jai's father
- Tiku Talsania as Swamy
- Hitanshu Lodhia as Anshu, Raj and Tia's son
- Pankaj Berry as Doctor

== Soundtrack ==
Dil Ka Rishta

Soundtrack album by Nadeem–Shravan
- Released: 25 October 2002
- Recorded: 2002
- Genre: Feature film soundtrack
- Length: 38:30
- Label: Tips Music Films
- Producer: Nadeem–Shravan

Nadeem–Shravan chronology
Jeena Sirf Merre Liye (2002)	Dil Ka Rishta (2002)	Indian Babu (2003)

The music is composed by Nadeem–Shravan with lyrics by Sameer.

Vocals are supplied by Alka Yagnik (for Rai), Kumar Sanu (for Rampal), and Udit Narayan (for Chatterjee). The album also features Sapna Awasthi, Jaspinder Narula, Babul Supriyo and Sarika Kapoor.

According to the Indian trade website Box Office India, with around 1,400,000 units sold, this film's soundtrack album was the year's eight highest-selling. The movie is a modern take on Kinara released in 1977.

No.	Title	Singer(s)	Length
1.	"Dil Ka Rishta"	Alka Yagnik, Udit Narayan & Kumar Sanu	5:00
2.	"Hai Dil"	Alka Yagnik & Kumar Sanu	4:24
3.	"Daiya Daiya Daiya Re"	Alka Yagnik	4:38
4.	"Dil Chura Le"	Alka Yagnik & Kumar Sanu	4:00
5.	"Saajan Saajan"	Alka Yagnik, Kumar Sanu & Sapna Awasthi	6:07
6.	"Kitna Majboor Ho Gaya"	Kumar Sanu	1:35
7.	"Haste Suraj Ki"	Udit Narayan	1:32
8.	"Saajan Saajan"	Jaspinder Narula	5:27
9.	"Dil Ka Rishta" (Sad)	Babul Supriyo & Sarika Kapoor	4:59
Total length:			38:30
