= Dhaakad =

2022 Indian film by Razneesh Ghai

- Theatrical release poster
- Directed by: Razneesh Ghai (Razy)
- Screenplay by: Razneesh Ghai (Razy); Rajiv G. Menon
- Story by: Razneesh Ghai (Razy); Chintan Gandhi; Rinish Ravindra
- Produced by: Deepak Mukut; Sohel Maklai
- Starring: Kangana Ranaut; Arjun Rampal; Divya Dutta; Sougata Ghosh; Saswata Chatterjee
- Cinematography: Tetsuo Nagata
- Edited by: Rameshwar S. Bhagat
- Music by: Shankar–Ehsaan–Loy; Dhruv Ghanekar; Badshah; Hiten Kumar
- Production companies: Sohum Rockstar Entertainment; Sohel Maklai Productions; Asylum Films
- Distributed by: Zee Studios
- Release date: 20 May 2022
- Running time: 131 minutes
- Country: India
- Language: Hindi
- Budget: est. ₹85 crore
- Box office: est. ₹3.77 crore

Dhaakad (transl. Formidable) is a 2022 Indian Hindi-language action film directed by Razneesh (Razy) Ghai and produced by Deepak Mukut and Sohel Maklai. It stars Kangana Ranaut, alongside Arjun Rampal, Divya Dutta and Saswata Chatterjee.

Dhaakad was released on 20 May 2022 and emerged as a box-office bomb.

== Synopsis ==
Agni, a ruthless agent at the International Task Force (ITF), is sent to India to eliminate Rudraveer, a coal mafioso involved in the arms trade and human trafficking. However, Agni's mission becomes personal when she discovers a bitter truth that connects her to Rudraveer. Film starts with Agni in a mission and saves girls getting trafficking by evil men. Agni goes to Rudraveer place and is assisted by Faisal who has daughter mer who gets affectionate by Agni, Faisal tells her rudraveer initially starts as a small gang and later joins Rohini a wicked prostitute business running woman who is also involved in human trafficking. Agni changes her appearance and finds through Rohini the middleeast business person who is recruiting all these girls.Agni is sent by her mentor to kill rudraveer but on the way rudraveer attacks the truck travelled by Agni and finally Agni gets stabbed and shot by rudraveer. Agni is hospitalised and survives to live. Agni remember her childhood as her father is killed by rodraveer . Meanwhile Rohini shoots down Faisal while questioning more about Agni and takes mer to rodraveers human trafficking place. Rodraveer identifies mer affectionate with Agni as mer sings a childhood song that Agni heard from rodraveer when her father got killed by rodraveer. Agni wants to save mer so first goes to Rohini who refuses to tell the place of mer and while about to take the gun Agni shoots her on head.mer is send by rodraveer to divert Agni who finally fights with rodraveer and kills him. But before death rodraveer hints of real person behind. Film ends with Agni shoots the mentor who confesses Agni's father was killed by him through rodraveer .

== Cast ==
- Kangana Ranaut as Agent Agni
- Arjun Rampal as Rudraveer
- Divya Dutta as Rohini
- Saswata Chatterjee as Agni's handler and mentor
- Sharib Hashmi as Fazal
- Tumul Balyan as Pratap
- Gabriel Georgiou as Shamsher
- Siddhant Shukla as Traitor
- Gyula Mesterhazy as Fyodor
- Daniel Viktor Nagy as Sheikh
- Mihir Ahuja as young Rudraveer
- Sejal Jaiswal

== Production ==
=== Development ===
Dhaakad was announced on 20 October 2020. Kangana shared her various looks from the film. Kangana wrote on Instagram, "She is fierce, feisty and fearless. #AgentAgni is all geared up to set the big screen on fire. In an interview Kangana said, "Dhaakad is not only a benchmark film for my career but will be a turning point for Indian cinema as well. The film is mounted on a large scale, and is one of a kind female-led action film."

=== Training ===
The actors appearing in the film as Agents, including Ranaut, underwent training for over three months.

=== Filming ===
Principal photography began on 15 January 2021. It has been shot in Betul, Madhya Pradesh and Budapest. Razneesh Razy Ghai, the director of the film wrote on his Instagram account, "The producers and I were insistent that we hire key members of the team from other film industries. When you want your film to have high-octane action, you have to go above and beyond. For key sequences, we roped in action directors from the United States, South Korea, Canada and South Africa. Hitz international action specialists, as well as Cameron Hilts and Sea-young Oh. The Indian stunt team was on par with our international collaborators." The filming was completed on 8 July 2021.

== Soundtrack ==
Dhaakad

Soundtrack album by Shankar–Ehsaan–Loy, Dhruv Ghanekar, Badshah and Hiten Kumar
- Released: 17 May 2022
- Genre: Feature film soundtrack
- Length: 25:53
- Language: Hindi
- Label: SRE Music

Official audio
- Dhaakad - Full Audio Songs Jukebox on YouTube

The film's soundtrack is composed by Shankar–Ehsaan–Loy and Dhruv Ghanekar while the lyrics are written by Amitabh Bhattacharya and Ishitta Arun.

No.	Title	Lyrics	Singer(s)	Length
1.	"She's On Fire"	Badshah, Hiten Kumar	Badshah, Nikhita Gandhi	2:45
2.	"Namonishan"	Amitabh Bhattacharya	Nikhita Gandhi, Shankar Mahadevan	4:20
3.	"So Ja Re"	Ishitta Arun	Sunidhi Chauhan, Hariharan	5:13
4.	"Babul"	Traditional	Richa Sharma	3:43
5.	"Barood"	Amitabh Bhattacharya	Sunidhi Chauhan	4:12
6.	"Dhaakad Title Song"	Ishitta Arun	Vasundhara Vee	5:40
Total length:				25:53

== Release ==
=== Theatrical ===
Dhaakad was released theatrically on 20 May 2022 along with Kartik Aaryan starrer Bhool Bhulaiyaa 2. The film was initially scheduled for a Diwali (November) 2020 release but due to the COVID-19 pandemic the film got postponed. The film was postponed again and a new release date, 8 April 2022, was announced on 18 October 2021.

=== Distribution ===
The film was distributed by Zee Studios.

=== Home media ===
The film premiered on 1 July 2022 on ZEE5 under subscription but, during the ZEE5 Manoranjan Festival, it was made free-to-air until 1 January 2023.

== Reception ==
=== Critical response ===
Shalini Langer of The Indian Express gave 3.5/5 stars and wrote "A slick action film that is also coherent – Kangana Ranaut-Divya Dutta-Arjun Rampal film is an achievement." Rachana Dubey of The Times Of India gave 3/5 stars and wrote "It would have been great if along with the superb action and terrific visuals, the story, too, could have packed a punch." Sonil Dedhia of News 18 gave 3/5 stars and wrote "Kangana Ranaut's solid performance in 'Dhaakad' combined with high-impact stunt work puts a stamp on her as a formidable female action star." Pooja Biraia Jaiswal of The Week gave 3/5 stars and wrote "Dhaakad is a popcorn film; an almost-edge-of-the-seat action thriller led by an able cast, spectacular action sequences and meticulous execution." Nandini Ramnath of Scroll.in gave 2/5 stars and wrote "Dhaakad makes little effort to credibly localise its themes."

Bharathi Pradhan of Lehren gave 1.5/5 stars and wrote "Dhaakad is singularly unimaginative in its presentation and execution." Sukanya Verma of Rediff gave 2/5 stars and wrote "Kangana Ranaut ticks off all the boxes of the poker-faced spy model in Dhakaad, but the movie needs real rescuing". Bollywood Hungama gave 1.5/5 stars and wrote "Dhaakad is all style and no substance and fails to deliver entertainment value." Anna M.M. Vetticad of Firstpost gave 0.5/5 stars and wrote "Dhaakad is marred by extremely violent scenes, vacuous writing, dull direction and is boring-as-hell." Swati Chopra of The Quint gave 1/5 stars and wrote, "Dhaakad's stunt choreography and camera work by Tetsua Nahata is impressive and that's what makes the film somewhat bearable."

=== Box office ===
Dhaakad was a major box office bomb, with most of its shows discontinued from cinemas within one week of release.
