= Arjun Rampal =

Indian film actor and model (born 1972)

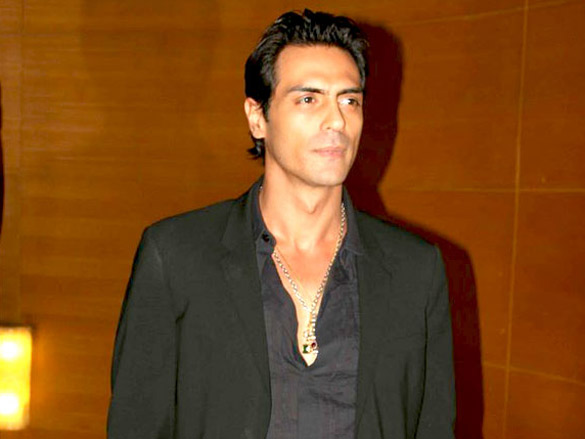
- Rampal in 2011
- Born: 26 November 1972 (age 53); Jabalpur, Madhya Pradesh, India
- Education: Hindu College, Delhi
- Occupations: Actor; model
- Years active: 1996–present
- Works: Filmography
- Spouse: Mehr Jesia (m. 1998; div. 2019) Gabriella Demetriades (m. 2026)
- Children: 4
- Awards: Full list

Arjun Rampal (born 26 November 1972) is an Indian actor and model who mainly works in Hindi films. He has starred in more than 40 films. Described as a versatile actor by the media, Rampal has received several awards including the National Film Award for Best Supporting Actor and the Filmfare Award for Best Supporting Actor for his performance in Rock On!!.

Rampal made his acting debut in Rajiv Rai's romance film Pyaar Ishq Aur Mohabbat (2001). He enacted lead roles in romance films including Deewaanapan (2001), Dil Hai Tumhaara (2002), Dil Ka Rishta (2003), Vaada (2005) and I See You (2006), action films Asambhav (2004) and D-Day (2013), thrillers Yakeen (2005) and Roy (2015), socio-political Chakravyuh (2012) and crime drama Inkaar (2013). The year 2002 marked a turning point for Rampal when he featured in Aankhen, his breakthrough success, though followed by a continuous setback.

Later Rampal found a career resurgence starring in the commercially successful mainstream films Don (2006), Om Shanti Om (2007), Housefull (2010), Raajneeti (2010) and Ra.One (2011) and acclaim for biopic Daddy (2017). After another big career decline, he made his Telugu debut as an antagonist in Bhagavanth Kesari (2023). His portrayal of Major Iqbal in the Dhurandhar Duology, comprising the spy action thrillers Dhurandhar (2025) and Dhurandhar: The Revenge (2026), was well received by audiences. The films became the second- and fifth-highest-grossing Indian films of all time, respectively. Rampal turned a film producer with I See You (2006) under his banner, Chasing Ganesha Films, and then produced the biopic Daddy (2017), for which he also co-wrote the screenplay.

== Early life and education ==
Rampal was born on 26 November 1972 in Jabalpur, Madhya Pradesh, India, in a family with military background. His maternal grandfather, Brigadier Gurdayal Singh, designed the first artillery gun for the Indian Army post-independence. His father Amarjeet Rampal is a Punjabi Hindu Brahmin while his mother Gwen Rampal was part Sikh and part Dutch. His mother died in 2018. Actress Kim Sharma is Arjun Rampal's first cousin.

Rampal grew up in a multicultural environment where the family celebrated Christmas, Diwali and Eid. He stayed with his mother after the separation of his parents and attended St. Patrick School (Devlali, Nashik) where his mother was a teacher. He then attended the Kodaikanal International School. Later, he graduated with a degree in economics with honours from Hindu College, Delhi. He went on to become a model and was featured in several music videos like Bekaraar (1996), Kinna Sona Tenu Rab Ne Banaya (1997) directed by Radhika Rao and Vinay Sapru, and Don't Marry Maya (1998) directed by Rajiv Rai.

== Acting career ==
=== 2001–2005: Early lead roles ===
Rampal was recommended by director Shekhar Kapur for a lead role in Ashok Mehta's Moksha. Rampal began shooting for the film opposite Manisha Koirala in 1997 but it took years to complete the film. He also signed for Shantanu Sheorey's Jadh opposite Jackie Shroff, Tabu and Smriti Mishra. The shooting of the film was completed but it was not released.

Rampal's first release that marked his acting debut in Bollywood was Rajiv Rai's romance film Pyaar Ishq Aur Mohabbat (2001) opposite Sunil Shetty, Aftab Shivdasani and Kirti Reddy. Rampal gave a show stealing performance and earned all the attention. He earned critical acclaim for his performance in the movie. Taran Adarsh of indiaFM wrote "Pyaar Ishq Aur Mohabbat is a showcase for Arjun Rampal to exhibit his talent. The guy looks dashing and emotes with utmost sincerity. He handled the emotional moments with maturity, which is so rare for a first-timer. A confident debut!" This established Rampal as a leading actor in the Indian film industry. He was nominated for the Filmfare Award for Best Male Debut but swept the awards in the Best Male Debut category at the Star Screen and IIFA ceremonies.

His next release was Ashu Trikha's Deewaanapan, in which Rampal was paired with Dia Mirza. He earned critical acclaim for his performance, but the film flopped at the box office. Taran Adarsh of IndiaFM wrote: "Arjun Rampal carries the film on his broad shoulders and comes up with a sincere performance that is consistent throughout. He is wonderful in action sequences and springs a pleasant surprise in the emotional moments by delivering the apposite expressions." Ashish Magotra of Rediff gave negative reviews on Rampal, writing: "Among the actors, Arjun Rampal as the hero does pretty much what he has been known to do. He models. His acting capabilities leave a lot to be desired." Moksha was his third release of the year. This film marked Rampal's third consecutive flop at the box office, but Rampal earned critical acclaim. Taran Adarsh of IndiaFM wrote: "Arjun Rampal excels in a role that was difficult to portray. He takes giant strides as a performer and proves that he's an actor with an amazing range." Priyanka Bhattacharya of Rediff considered the movie to be "more a 70-mm portfolio for Arjun Rampal than a story."

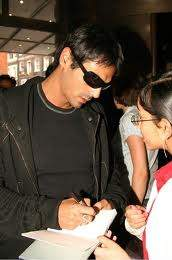
Rampal signing autographs at Temptation photocall held at the Washington Hotel in London

Rampal's first release of 2002 was Vipul Amrutlal Shah's Aankhen, in which Rampal starred in an ensemble cast featuring Amitabh Bachchan, Akshay Kumar, Sushmita Sen, Paresh Rawal and Aditya Pancholi. He played the role of a blind person. The film was ranked above average at the box office and became the fourth-highest grossing Bollywood film of 2002. His next release was Kundan Shah's Dil Hai Tumhaara opposite Rekha, Preity Zinta, Mahima Chaudhry and Jimmy Shergill. The film was a flop.

In 2003, Rampal played a lead role in Naresh Malhotra's Dil Ka Rishta opposite Aishwarya Rai. Rampal earned critical acclaim for his performance. Ronjita Kulkarni of Rediff wrote: "Arjun Rampal shakes off his wooden image and comes up with a good performance. He is subtle and convincing in the emotional scenes. He has certainly moved on from Pyaar Ishq Aur Mohabbat." It was ranked the thirtieth film of the year on the basis of box office collections. Rampal's next role was in Khalid Mohammed's Tehzeeb opposite Urmila Matondkar. Rampal played a Muslim in the film. The film earned critical acclaim. Taran Adarsh praised his performance, quoting: "the easy-going attitude his character reflects injects that certain sheen to the enterprise."

In 2004, Rampal collaborated with Rajiv Rai for the second time in his first action thriller Asambhav. Rampal starred opposite Priyanka Chopra and played the role of an Indian commando Captain Aadit Arya. The film was entirely shot in Switzerland. Released on 23 July, Asambhav was Rampal's only release of the year. Shahid Khan of PlanetBollywood.com wrote: "Arjun Rampal looks good and he suits the mould of the action hero very well."

Rampal's first release of 2005 was Satish Kaushik's Vaada, in which he played a lead role opposite Ameesha Patel and Zayed Khan. The film was a flop. Patcy N of Rediff praised Rampal, writing: "Arjun Rampal has done a good job; his is a subdued performance, and the model-turned-actor looks great in most scenes." Rampal's next release was Vikram Bhatt's multi-starrer action film Elaan. The film managed to do well and became an average-grosser at the box office. Rampal earned critical acclaim for his performance in Elaan. Subhash K. Jha of IANS praised Rampal and wrote: "Arjun is pretty much on his own. Once again playing a man with responsibilities he brings a controlled conviction to both his scenes with his screen daughter and his engrossing death scene." Merril Diniz of Rediff wrote: "Arjun Rampal is almost believable as the rugged ex-cop. He has a deep baritone and svelte body language."

Rampal's third release of the year was the mystery thriller Yakeen, in which Rampal was paired in a lead role with Priyanka Chopra for the second time. He received acclaim for improving his emotional acting. Taran Adarsh praised his performance, quoting: "Cast in complex role, Arjun Rampal delivers his best performance so far. The role would've lost its bearings had it been entrusted to an inferior actor, but Arjun sinks his teeth into it and emerges trumps. The actor portrays the gamut of emotions with aplomb and delivers a flawless performance. He is truly efficient in sequences when he starts suspecting his wife's fidelity in the first half. The shower sequence as also the intermission point display Arjun's range as an actor." Rampal's last release of the year was Apoorva Lakhia's Ek Ajnabee opposite Amitabh Harivansh Rai Bachchan and Perizaad Zorabian. This film featured Rampal in his first negative role as Shekhar Verma, the bodyguard of a child, but is actually a corrupted person. Subhash K Jha praised Rampal's performance and wrote, "The narrative has some nice supporting performances, particularly Arjun Rampal who's gone both over and under the skin of his bar-owner ex-army man's role. Not only does Rampal look right, he feels right."

His first release of 2006 was the love triangle based Humko Tumse Pyaar Hai opposite Bobby Deol and Ameesha Patel. This film was a delayed release. Satyajit of SmasHits quoted "Arjun Rampal has also been promising and it shows in his performance. The media might have labeled him "wooden actor" but he has shown great improvisation in emotional scenes." Taran Adarsh wrote: "Arjun is awkward at places in initial portions, but gets into the rhythm subsequently. The emotional sequences in the second half clearly indicate that he's come a long way." His next appearance was the multi-starrer anthology Darna Zaroori Hai. Rampal starred in the story "Spirits Do Come" opposite Bipasha Basu and Makrand Deshpande, directed by Prawal Raman. Despite a cast of stars, the film flopped at the box office.

=== 2006–07: Producer and breakthrough ===
Rampal reprised the supporting role of Jasjit in Don – The Chase Begins Again, a remake of the 1978 movie Don. The role had been played by Pran in the original Don. Don – The Chase Begins Again starred Shah Rukh Khan and Priyanka Chopra and the movie became Rampal's first hit. The film proved to be a breakthrough movie for Rampal, although Khan earned the most attention. Taran Adarsh praised his performance, quoting: "Despite the shortcomings, he makes a sincere attempt."

Rampal established his own production company Chasing Ganesha Films with his wife Mehr Jesia. The first movie under that banner I See You was Rampal's last release of 2006. He played a lead role opposite newcomer Vipasha Agarwal. The movie was shot entirely in London, England. Like his past movies, I See You was also a failure at the box office and received poor reviews. However, Rampal earned critical acclaim for his work. Taran Adarsh wrote: "I See You rests on Arjun's shoulders. Arjun is efficient in a role that doesn't really demand histrionics. He has proved his credentials in the past and his performance in this film is at par with his earlier works. He works best in the dramatic portions."

In 2007, Rampal starred in an antagonist role in Om Shanti Om opposite Shah Rukh Khan and the debuting Deepika Padukone. The film emerged as the year's highest-grossing film in India and the overseas market, and became India's highest grossing production ever up to that point with a worldwide gross of over ₹ 1.48 billion. It was Rampal's biggest hit in his career and earned him critical acclaim for his villainous role. Sukanya Verma of Rediff wrote: "Rampal's persona exudes too much warmth to pass off as a cold-blooded antagonist." Rampal won the Zee Cine Award for Best Actor in a Negative Role for his villainous performance in Om Shanti Om and got nominations at the IIFA, Star Screen and Apsara ceremonies.

=== 2008–11: Critical acclaim ===
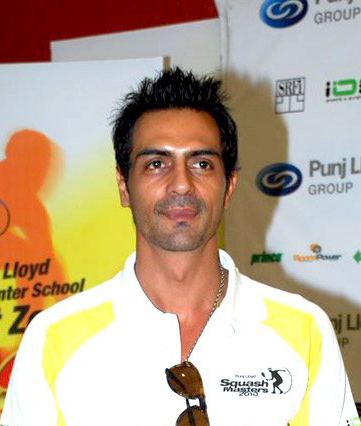
Rampal at the All India Squash Championship Awards Function in 2010

Following the success of Om Shanti Om, Rampal started to rise as a successful actor. In 2008, Rampal gave a performance in Rock On!! as Joseph "Joe" Mascarenhas, the lead guitarist of a band, a poor idealist who never learned that self-promotion is more important than music in a remixed world. Rampal learned guitar to prepare for his role. His performance was widely acclaimed, earning him the prestigious National Film Award for Best Supporting Actor at the 56th National Film Awards, Filmfare Best Supporting Actor Award at the 54th Filmfare Awards, IIFA Award for Best Supporting Actor at the 10th IIFA Awards and Screen Award for Best Supporting Actor. This brought wider success and acclaim to Rampal. Noted critic Nikhat Kazmi of The Times of India praised Rampal's performance and wrote: "If you actually had to choose, then the vote would go for Arjun Rampal who displays a newfound maturity and looks absolutely groovy with his windblown hair and his guitar-strumming stance." Martin D'Souza of Bollywood Trade News Network praised Rampal, writing: "Arjun Rampal is slowly coming into his own. After playing a character with a negative shade in Om Shanti Om, he returns with another powerful performance as Joe Mascarenhas, the lead guitarist of the band. Vibrant at first, and then subdued he walks the act with a rock star gait."

Later that year, he starred in Rituparno Ghosh's English-language arthouse film The Last Lear, alongside Amitabh Bachchan and Preity Zinta. The film premiered at the Toronto International Film Festival and was received well at a number of other film festivals. Upon its theatrical release in India, Rampal got favourable reviews for his performance. He gave a show-stealing performance. Taran Adarsh wrote: "Arjun is evolving into a fine actor. After Rock On!!, this is another performance that would fetch Arjun laurels." Martin D'Souza considered it to be Rampal's best performance to date. Rajeev Masand of CNN-IBN praised Rampal's performance, writing: "Arjun Rampal shines as the guilt-ridden filmmaker, too ashamed to even apologise for his selfishness."

Rampal's only release of 2009 was Deepak Tijori's Fox, in which he starred opposite Sunny Deol, Sagarika Ghatge and Udita Goswami. The film mainly received negative reviews and flopped at the box office, but Rampal earned critical acclaim. Taran Adarsh praised Rampal's performance as perfect.

2010 would go on to become the most successful year of Rampal's career with three back to back hits. The first was Sajid Khan's comedy film Housefull, in which he starred in a supporting role. The film received negative reviews, but became a huge hit at the box office. Rampal's next release was Prakash Jha's multi-starrer Raajneeti. Rampal received critical acclaim for his supporting role of Prithvi in the movie. Taran Adarsh wrote: "Arjun is a revelation and what a terrific performance he pitches in. He's like an untamed lion." His performance earned him a nomination for the Filmfare Best Supporting Actor Award. He won the award in the Best Supporting Actor at the IIFA, Apsara and Zee Cine categories. His last release of the year was Siddharth Malhotra and Karan Johar's We Are Family, in which he played a lead role opposite Kajol and Kareena Kapoor. It was an average grosser and Rampal's first successful movie that featured him in a lead role. Taran Adarsh wrote: "Arjun continues to surprise. Rock On!!, Housefull, Raajneeti and now We Are Family indicates the growth of this actor. He handles the emotional moments well, too."

In 2011, Rampal played the titular negative role in Anubhav Sinha's science fiction movie Ra.One. The movie became a successful film in India and overseas and received mixed reviews. Rampal's new bald look earned him a lot of appreciation and popularity within the audiences. Majority of the fans considered his "Ra. One" look to be better than that of the protagonist "G.One". He earned critical acclaim for his villainous performance. Martin D'Souza praised Rampal's performance and considered him to be the saviour of the film that was being flawless in the second half. He wrote: "It's only after the interval that the plot meanders a bit, loses it sting and almost falls apart like a pixelised image, before Arjun lights up the screen." Arthur J Pais of Rediff.com wrote: "The best person to gain from the film directed by Anubhav Sinha with more inane and crude sexual jokes than in any recent Hindi film, is Arjun Rampal. His body language and brooding face creates a quietly menacing villain." Raja Sen wrote: "Arjun Rampal is the best thing in the biggest budget Indian feature of all time." Aseem Chhabra considered Rampal to be the "most interesting element of the film."

=== 2012–2018: Experimental roles and career setbacks ===
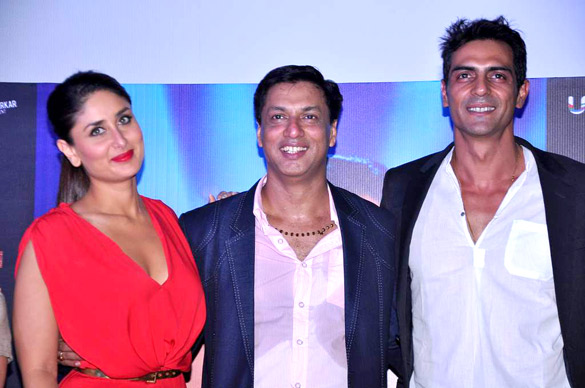
Rampal (right) with co-star Kareena Kapoor and director Madhur Bhandarkar during the launch of the film Heroine in 2012

Rampal had three releases in 2012: Madhur Bhandarkar's Heroine, Prakash Jha's Chakravyuh and the comedy movie Ajab Gazabb Love, with all three failing at the box office. However, Rampal earned critical acclaim for his performances. In Heroine, Rampal played the role of Aryan Khanna, a well-known actor, starring opposite Kareena Kapoor. The movie failed to become a success at the box office with an earning of ₹225 million (US$2.3 million) net at the weekend. It was declared below average by Box Office India.

In Chakravyuh, Rampal played the role of a police officer, SP Adil Khan, starring opposite Abhay Deol, Esha Gupta, Manoj Bajpai, Om Puri and Anjali Patil. The film grossed ₹159 million (US$1.7 million) in the first week. However, Rampal earned critical acclaim for his performance as a police officer. Rohit Vats of CNN-IBN wrote: "Arjun Rampal's image and dialogue delivery mar his chances, but it is one of his better performances, in fact he has given Abhay Deol a run for his money in double shots."

In Ajab Gazabb Love, Rampal played the double role of twin brothers Karan and Arjun, based on the popular duo of Karan Arjun from the hit 1995 film of the same name. Though the film flopped at the box office, Rampal earned critical acclaim for his double role performance. Madhureeta Mukherjee of The Times of India wrote: "Arjun Rampal's comic-timing is a revelation. His double-act entertains and adds energy to this comedy."

His first release of 2013 was Sudhir Mishra's Inkaar, opposite Chitrangada Singh. Though the film flopped at the box office, Rampal earned positive reviews for his performance by critics and audiences. Taran Adarsh praised Rampal's performance, quoting: "Arjun Rampal displays remarkable understanding of the character. Post Chakravyuh, which released a few months ago, this is yet another power-packed performance that makes you realize that this supermodel has transformed into a super actor."

His next film was Nikhil Advani's action movie D-Day, co-starring Rishi Kapoor, Irrfan Khan, Shruti Haasan and Huma Qureshi. He portrayed Rudra Pratap Singh, a RAW agent. To prepare for his role, Rampal met real RAW agents. He earned critical acclaim for his performance. Mohar Basu of Koimoi wrote: "Arjun Rampal has evolved for the better as an actor. His infallible personality and his portrayal that has hints of both anguish and strength is what makes him stand out despite the presence of more powerful actors. He acted like a dream and that is commendable, to say the least." Rummana Ahmed of Yahoo! Movies wrote: "As a former army officer and now an undercover agent, Arjun is intense and sharp, his body language apt and his performance precise." Shubha Shetty of Mid-Day wrote: "It is Arjun Rampal as Rudra who amazes with a performance that is undoubtedly his best till date. Rampal, apart from looking as gorgeous as he does, comfortably displays a range of emotions with surprising deft." Mansha Rastogi of Now Running. com wrote: "Arjun Rampal has excelled himself by leaps and bound and makes a commendable effort of an ex-army man turned RAW Agent delightfully." Rajeev Masand wrote: "Arjun Rampal does some of his best work here as the rebellious agent simmering with pent-up anger." Sarit Ray of Hindustan Times wrote: "Arjun Rampal (agent Rudra Pratap Singh) brings to the role what he brings to every film – good looks and a standard brooding expression."

His last release of the year was Prakash Jha's Satyagraha (2013). Rampal was featured in an ensemble cast including Amitabh Bachchan, Ajay Devgan, Kareena Kapoor, Manoj Bajpayee and Amrita Rao. Rampal played the role of Arjun Singh, a social activist who joined a campaign to free his former college principal.

His next film Roy was initially scheduled to release in 2014 but it was delayed and ultimately released in 2015. He portrayed the main protagonist of the romantic thriller alongside Jacqueline Fernandez and Ranbir Kapoor. This was a critical and commercial failure. Critic Sarita A. Tanwar described it as a "boring, exhausting and pretentious" film.

In 2016, Rampal starred in the sequel to Rock On!!, Rock On!! 2 alongside Farhan Akhtar, Shraddha Kapoor, Purab Kohli, in which he reprised the role of Joe Mascarenhas. It was a flop at box-office owing primarily to demonetisation but the camaraderie between the actors was appreciated in the film. His next release was Kahaani 2, in which he portrayed the role of a sub-inspector on the hunt of missing protagonist (portrayed by Vidya Balan). The film was an average grosser but his performance was appreciated.

His next venture was a biopic on gangster-turned-politician Arun Gawli called Daddy (2017) in which he portrayed Gawli and also produced the film. He reduced 10 kg weight and missed workout for nearly two years to portray the character. His role was critically praised and Rajeev Masand of News18 wrote "It's a shrewd performance, relying almost entirely on body language over histrionics, and the actor doesn't disappoint." He followed with the leading role in J. P. Dutta's multi-starrer war film Paltan (2018), based on the real Nathu La and Cho La clashes between Indian and Chinese armies in 1967. Rampal portrayed the character of Rai Singh Yadav, who led 2 Grenadiers in the battle.

=== 2019–present: Streaming ventures and resurgence ===
Rampal made his OTT debut with Zee5's thriller web series The Final Call (2019), based on the novel I Will Go with You by Priya Kumar. He played the leading role of a pilot with mental issues risking the lives of all the passengers onboard. His performance in the series received appreciation from audiences and critical acclaim.

Rampal returned to films after a three-year hiatus in 2021 with the courtroom drama Nail Polish, co-starring Manav Kaul. Rampal portrayed a lawyer defending a social activist accused for raping and murdering children and killing others. His second release of the year was Aparna Sen's The Rapist, in which he played the main lead alongside Konkona Sen Sharma. The film has been nominated for Kim Jiseok award at 26th Busan International Film Festival.

Rampal was to make his Telugu film debut with Hari Hara Veera Mallu in the role of the Mughal Emperor Aurangzeb, but had dropped out due to other commitments. In 2022, Rampal appeared as the antagonist in the action film Dhaakad, his first release theatrical release since Paltan. In 2023, Rampal eventually made his Telugu debut as the antagonist in Bhagavanth Kesari, which enjoyed a decent run at the box-office. Rampal continued his antagonistic roles in 2024 with the action film Crakk, which emerged as a box-office bomb.

Rampal starred in Aditya Dhar's Dhurandhar Duology, comprising the spy action thrillers Dhurandhar (2025) and Dhurandhar: The Revenge (2026), alongside Ranveer Singh, Sanjay Dutt, Akshaye Khanna, and R. Madhavan. He portrayed Major Iqbal, the secondary antagonist of the first film and the primary antagonist of its sequel. His performance, based on Ilyas Kashmiri, was praised and the two films emerged major commercial success, ranking among Indian cinema's top five highest-earners.

== Other work ==
=== Television ===
In 2008, Rampal made his television debut as one of the three judges of the fourth season of the dance reality television show Nach Baliye on STAR Plus. The other two judges were choreographer Farah Khan and film actress Karisma Kapoor. In 2010, Rampal hosted the 5th Apsara Awards with Preity Zinta.

In November 2011, Rampal started hosting a new television show called Love 2 Hate U airing on STAR World India. The theme of the show was that Rampal would try and change the perception of people who hate Bollywood actors by bringing them face to face with them. The first episode aired on 20 November and the last episode aired on 15 January. In 2019, Rampal made his debut in a digital web series with The Final Call in which he played Captain Karan Sachdev and won the Best Actor in a Web Series Award.

In 2021, Rampal made his debut in a digital web film titled Nail Polish.

=== Stage performances ===
Alongside acting, Arjun Rampal has performed in many international stage concerts with several of Bollywood actors and actresses. In 2002, Rampal participated in his first world tour; Heartthrobs: Live in Concert with Hrithik Roshan, Aftab Shivdasani and sisters Karisma Kapoor and Kareena Kapoor. His next concert was the international Temptations 2004 with Shah Rukh Khan, Saif Ali Khan, Rani Mukerji, Preity Zinta and Priyanka Chopra. It was the most successful Bollywood concert at the time. Nineteen shows occurred across the globe.

In 2008, Rampal participated in Temptations Reloaded 2008, a series of concerts showcased across several different countries. It was set by Shah Rukh Khan. The show also featured Khan, Kareena Kapoor, Katrina Kaif, Ganesh Hegde, Javed Ali and Anusha Dandekar. It took place at the Ahoy Rotterdam venue in Rotterdam, Netherlands. Several months later, Rampal again joined Khan, Kapoor and Kaif to perform for 15,000 spectators at Dubai's Festival City Arena. In 2010, Rampal was paired with Khan in a concert at the Army Stadium, Dhaka, Bangladesh to a packed audience. The other participants were Rani Mukerji, Neeraj Shridhar and Ishaa Koppikar.

== In the media ==
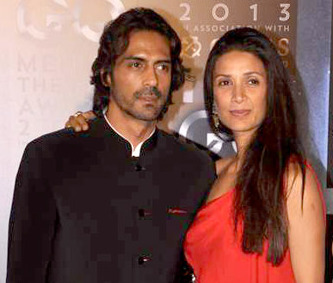
Rampal with his ex-wife Mehr Jesia in 2013

Rampal has gained a frequent popularity and fan base on the basis of his good looks and acting. He is described as a versatile and popular actor by the media. He has been frequently described by the Indian media as "the hunk". He was voted as The Times of India's "Most Desirable Man" of 2012, beating 49 other men including actors, politicians and sportsmen. Also in 2017, he was included in Times of India's "Most Desirable Man" list at No. 9. In 2012, Arjun Rampal, in association with Percept Limited launched "Lost Festival". "Lost" is a music festival driven by culture, tradition & soul. In 2013, he joined PETA, in its campaign to ban horse-drawn carriages in Mumbai. Rampal's luxury night club "Lap", situated in New Delhi, hosting DJs and musicians like Lady Gaga, the Formula 1 after-parties, attended by Bernie Ecclecston. He shut the club in 2016 after 8 years.

== Personal life ==
Rampal married Mehr Jesia in 1998 and has two daughters, Mahikaa and Myra, with her. On 28 May 2018 the couple announced their separation in a joint statement after 20 years of marriage. They were granted divorce by a Bandra family court in November 2019. The couple's two daughters will live with their mother.

In April 2019, Rampal announced that his girlfriend, Gabriella Demetriades, was pregnant. Demetriades gave birth to a son on 18 July 2019. The couple welcomed their second son, on 20 July 2023. After being in a live-in relationship for 8 years, the couple officially got married in August 2026.

== Awards and nominations ==
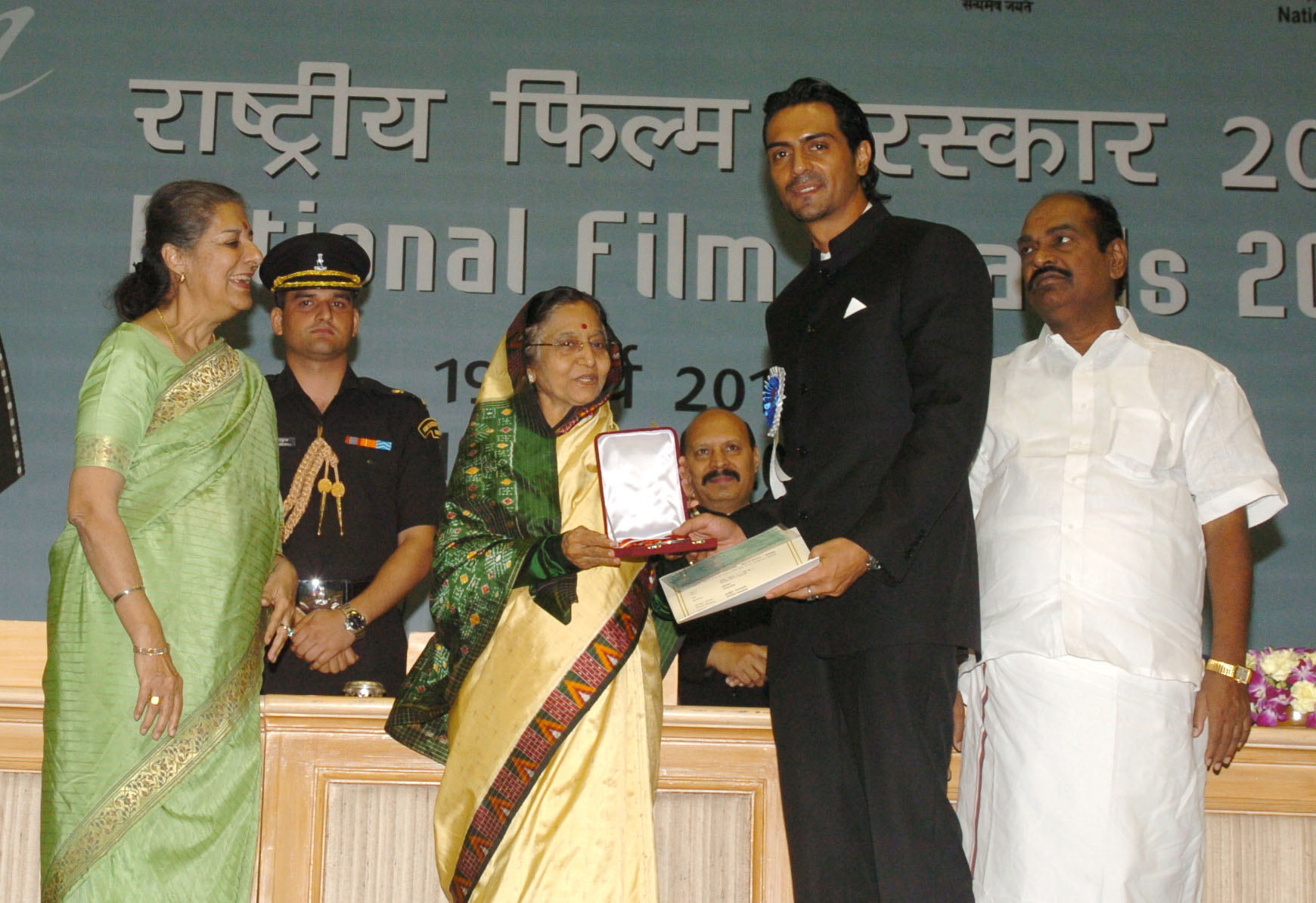
Arjun Rampal receiving the National Film Award for Best Supporting Actor for Hindi film "Rock On", at the 56th National Film Awards function, 2010.

Arjun Rampal has received numerous awards in his career, including a Filmfare Award for Best Supporting Actor and the prestigious National Film Award for Best Supporting Actor for Rock On!! (2008). He has also fetched awards for his performances in Pyaar Ishq Aur Mohabbat (2001), Om Shanti Om (2007), Raajneeti (2010) and Housefull (2010).
