= Deewaanapan =

2001 Indian film by Ashu Trikha

- Poster
- Directed by: Ashu Trikha
- Written by: Ashu Trikha
- Produced by: Vashu Bhagnani
- Starring: Arjun Rampal; Dia Mirza
- Cinematography: Suhas Gujarathi
- Edited by: Steven H. Bernard
- Music by: Aadesh Shrivastava
- Production company: Pooja Entertainment
- Release date: 16 November 2001
- Running time: 157 minutes
- Country: India
- Language: Hindi
- Budget: ₹6 crore
- Box office: ₹ 8.89 crore

Deewaanapan (transl. Insanity) is a 2001 Indian Hindi-language romantic action film directed by Ashu Trikha. It stars Arjun Rampal and Dia Mirza in the lead roles, with Om Puri and Vinod Khanna in supporting roles. The film was released on 16 November 2001.

== Plot ==
Suraj Saxena lives in a remote hill station in India with his father, Prakash, mother, and younger sister, Asha. One day he meets with Kiran Choudhary, who has come on a holiday trip with a group of girls. He offers to show her around, and they fall in love with each other. Suraj is unable to see her home by the train as Prakash had chest pains and had to be rushed to the hospital. But Suraj is unable to get Kiran out of his mind and heart. Before Asha gets married, the family decides to relocate to Mumbai, where Suraj enlists in college and makes several new friends, as well as becoming a popular basketball player. He eventually meets Kiran, and both renew their romance. Ranveer Choudhary does not appreciate the attention of a poor man like Suraj on Kiran and has Suraj brought up before him and introduced to his many friends, which include prominent lawyers, politicians, high-ranking civil and municipal employees, the police commissioner, as well as the state chief minister. Suraj is warned of dire consequences if he and his family do not leave town immediately. Suraj does not leave town, and hell descends on his family and himself. His mother is unable to purchase food and is publicly humiliated; Prakash is followed around by Ranveer's goons, harassed, and robbed, and then faces the ultimate humiliation of being publicly arrested, handcuffed, and imprisoned on charges of conspiring against the country and loses his job; and some of Suraj's friends exile him.

== Cast ==
- Arjun Rampal as Suraj Saxena
- Dia Mirza as Kiran Choudhary
- Vinod Khanna as Ranveer Choudhary
- Om Puri as Prakash Saxena
- Smita Jaykar as Mrs. Saxena
- Sharat Saxena as Shankar Deshpande
- Avtaar Gill as Chief Minister
- Rakesh Bedi as Raju
- Chitrapama Banerjee as Asha Saxena
- Vikas Sethi as Rocky
- Kabir Sadanand as Sameer "Sam" Rane
- Vishwajeet Pradhan as College Volleyball Coach
- Jeetu Verma as Goon of Ranveer Chaudhary

== Soundtrack ==
Deewaanapan

Soundtrack album by Aadesh Shrivastava
- Released: 2001
- Genre: Feature film soundtrack
- Language: Hindi
- Label: Saregama

The film's soundtrack composed by Aadesh Shrivastava and lyrics written by Sameer.

Track Listing
No.	Title	Singer(s)	Length
1.	"Doston Naam Karna Hai"	KK, Shaan, Hema Sardesai, Shraddha Pandit	6:08
2.	"Haan Mera Deewaanapan"	Shaan, Sunidhi Chauhan	5:45
3.	"Haan Mera Deewaanapan (Version 2)"	Shaan, Sunidhi Chauhan	5:44
4.	"Hum Deewane"	KK, Shaan, Hema Sardesai	3:01
5.	"Kamli Kamli"	Sukhwinder Singh, Richa Sharma	7:04
6.	"Main Ek Deewaana Ladka"	Shaan	6:35
7.	"Nach Nach Nach"	Adnan Sami, Sukhwinder Singh, Falguni Pathak	7:17
8.	"Satrangi"	Anuradha Sriram	4:36
Total length:			48:19

== Awards and nominations ==
=== Star Screen Awards ===
Won

- Star Screen Award for Most Promising Newcomer – Male: Arjun Rampal

Nominated

- Star Screen Award for Most Promising Newcomer – Female: Dia Mirza

=== Zee Cine Awards ===
Nominated

- Zee Cine Award for Best Male Debut: Arjun Rampal
