= Raajneeti =

2010 Indian film by Prakash Jha

- Theatrical release poster
- Directed by: Prakash Jha
- Written by: Prakash Jha
- Screenplay by: Prakash Jha; Anjum Rajabali
- Produced by: Ronnie Screwvala; Prakash Jha; Pooja Shetty Deora
- Starring: Ajay Devgn; Nana Patekar; Ranbir Kapoor; Katrina Kaif; Arjun Rampal; Manoj Bajpayee; Sarah Thompson; Naseeruddin Shah
- Cinematography: Sachin K. Krishn
- Edited by: Santosh Mandal
- Music by: Score: Wayne Sharpe; Songs: Pritam; Aadesh Shrivastava; Shantanu Moitra; Wayne Sharpe
- Production companies: Prakash Jha Productions; Walkwater Media Ltd
- Distributed by: UTV Motion Pictures
- Release date: 4 June 2010
- Running time: 170 minutes
- Country: India
- Language: Hindi
- Budget: ₹45 crore
- Box office: ₹145.50 crore

Raajneeti (transl. Politics) is a 2010 Indian Hindi-language political thriller film co-written, directed and produced by Prakash Jha, with a screenplay by Anjum Rajabali and Prakash Jha. Depicting an archetypal conflict between rival political families and parties, based on the Mahabharata, the film starred an ensemble cast of Ajay Devgn, Nana Patekar, Ranbir Kapoor, Katrina Kaif, Arjun Rampal, Manoj Bajpayee, Sarah Thompson and Naseeruddin Shah. It is produced by Prakash Jha Productions and distributed by UTV Motion Pictures and Walkwater Media.

Raajneeti was shot extensively in Bhopal. The title, which translates literally as "Politics" and contextually as "Affairs of State," was promoted with the tagline "Politics and Beyond..."

Amid much controversy, Raajneeti was released in theatres worldwide on 4 June 2010. The film received positive reviews from critics both in India and internationally, receiving high acclaim for its direction, screenplay, and performances of the ensemble cast. It became a major commercial success, grossing over ₹145.5 crore (US$15 million) worldwide, emerging as one of the fourth highest-grossing Indian films of 2010.

At the 56th Filmfare Awards, Raajneeti received 4 nominations – Best Actor (Kapoor) and Best Supporting Actor (for Rampal, Bajpayee and Patekar). Indiagames also released a mobile video game based on the film.

== Plot ==
Bharti Rai, the daughter of Ramnath Rai, a prominent politician, has an illegitimate son with a rival leftist leader, Bhaskar Sanyal. The son is abandoned by Brij Gopal, Bharti's brother. Bharti is married to Chandra Pratap, the younger brother of Bhanu Pratap, leader of the Rashtrawadi Party.

=== 30 years later ===
The minority state government collapses when the Rashtrawadi party withdraws its support. Bhanu Pratap suffers a stroke and hands over power to Chandra Pratap. Chandra's elder son, Prithvi Pratap, tries to take advantage of his father's power, which results in a clash with his cousin, Veerendra Pratap. For the upcoming midterm polls, Prithvi rejects the nomination of local leader Sooraj Kumar, who is chosen by the common people. Sooraj gets Veerendra's support instead. Unknown to all, Sooraj is Bharti's abandoned son, who was found and brought up by the Pratap family's driver Ram Charittra and his wife. When Sooraj demands a candidacy in the elections, Brij Gopal shrewdly nominates his father Ram. Chandra Pratap's younger son, Samar Pratap, returns from the United States. His childhood friend Indu proposes to him, but he declines.

In order to regain his power and be the chief-ministerial candidate in the state assembly election, Veerendra has Chandra Pratap assassinated and Prithvi is arrested. Superintendent of Police (SP) Sharma, under Veerendra's influence, presses rape charges against Prithvi. In order to bail him out, Samar promises Veerendra Prithvi's resignation. However, Samar and Prithvi begin rallying public support. The bedridden Bhanu Pratap expels Prithvi, who forms the new Jana Shakti party. To raise funds for the new party from Indu's industrialist father, Samar ensures Prithvi's marriage to Indu against her will. Meanwhile, Samar's American girlfriend Sarah arrives in India to meet him.

Samar kills Babulal, an old party associate of Bhanu Pratap, after uncovering that Sooraj and Veerendra had murdered his father. Prithvi kills SP Sharma. Indu and Prithvi consummate their marriage. Sarah realizes that the two brothers are committing political murders and decides to return to the US, pregnant. Veerendra and Sooraj plan to assassinate Samar by planting a bomb in his car, but it is Prithvi and Sarah who perish in the explosion. Sooraj is revealed to be the first child of Bharti.

Devastated by the loss of his brother and girlfriend, Samar retaliates by suggesting that Indu take the reins of the party. On the counting day, Samar lures Veerendra and Sooraj into a trap, and Veerendra gets shot by Samar and his men. Sooraj cannot bring himself to shoot Samar since they are brothers. Veerendra dies. Brij Gopal prompts Samar to shoot Sooraj to take revenge for the destruction of his family. Samar, not aware of his relationship with Sooraj, shoots him.

The election results are declared. Jan Shakti Party emerges with a majority, and Indu becomes the Chief Minister. Samar and Indu mend their differences. Indu is pregnant with Prithvi's child, while Samar leaves India to look after Sarah's mother.

== Cast ==
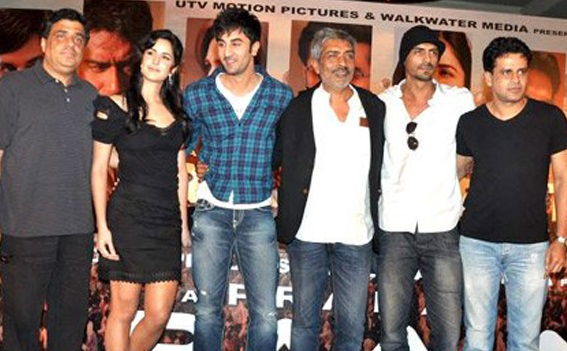
Raajneeti cast at press conference

- Ajay Devgn as Sooraj Kumar: a local leader, the biological son of Bhaskar Sanyal and Bharti Pratap and the friend of Virendra Pratap. His character is based on that of Karna
- Nana Patekar as Brij Gopal: the god-son of Ramnath Rai, the brother of Bharti Pratap and the mentor of Prithviraj Pratap when he founds the Jana Shakti party. His character is partially based on Lord Krishna
- Ranbir Kapoor as Samar Pratap: the younger son of Chandra Pratap and the Executive of the Jana Shakti party. His character is based on Arjuna.
- Katrina Kaif as Indu Pratap (née Seksaria): the Chief Minister of Madhya Pradesh, who initially loved Samar, but was married to Prithviraj Pratap. Her character is based on Draupadi.
- Arjun Rampal as Prithviraj "Prithvi" Pratap: the founder of the Jana Shakti party, the elder son of Chandra Pratap and the brother of Samar Pratap. His character is partially based on Bhima.
- Manoj Bajpayee as Veerendra Pratap: the chief ministerial candidate from the Rashtrawadi party, the son of Bhanu Pratap and the main antagonist. His character is partially based on Duryodhana.
- Sarah Thompson as Sarah Jean Collins: the girlfriend of Samar Pratap. Her character is based on Subhadra.
- Naseeruddin Shah as Bhaskar Sanyal: a leftist leader who opposed the government of Ramnath Rai. His character is based on Lord Surya.
- Darshan Jariwala as Ramnath Rai: the former Chief Minister, the father of Bharti Pratap and the godfather of Brij Gopal.
- Chetan Pandit as Chandra Pratap: the younger brother of Bhanu Pratap and the father of Prithviraj Pratap and Samar Pratap, he leads the party for a while after his brother suffers a heart attack. His character is partially based on Pandu.
- Shruti Seth as a party worker who seduces Prithvi for getting an election ticket.
- Nikhila Trikha as Bharti Pratap: the daughter of Ramnath Rai, the 'rakhi' sister of Brij Gopal, the wife of Chandra Pratap and the former associate of Bhaskar Sanyal. Her character is based on Kunti.
- Vinay Apte as Babulal: His character is partially based on Shakuni.
- Kiran Karmarkar as Sharma, an SP: His character is partially based on Dushasana. He is seen following orders from Veerendra Pratap and is loyal to him.
- Dayashankar Pandey as Ram Charittra: His character is based on Adhiratha, the adoptive father of Karna.
- Khan Jahangir Khan as Bhanu Pratap: the President of the Rashtrawadi party and the elder brother of Chandra Pratap. His character is partially based on Dhritarashtra.
- Ravi Khemu as Rajkumar Sakseria: Indu's father. His character is partially based on Drupada.
- Barkha Bisht in a cameo in item number "Ishq Barse"

== Reception ==
=== Critical reception ===
Mayank Shekhar of Hindustan Times rated it 3/5 and criticized saying, "There's a reason Mahabharata was a television series. Shyam Benegal could brilliantly adapt it around India’s corporate boardroom, only for his contained minimalism (Kalyug (1981)). What you sense here instead then is an over-dramatic, over-written screenplay: an over-boiled egg." He said that the sub-plots of various characters have an awkward conclusions. He compared Jha's earlier films Gangaajal (2003) and Apaharan (2005) and remarked that they are "finely focused works" in comparison to Raajneeti. Nikhat Kazmi of The Times of India rated it 4/5 and said, "The film basically anchors its plot in two classic tales — The Mahabharata and The Godfather (1972) — to create an engrossing diatribe on India's political system where democracy may prevail, but not in its purest form." Anupama Chopra of NDTV rated it 3/5 and said "Jha creates a real sense of the machinations and sordid deals that fuel politics but then hobbles it with outlandish twists and some decidedly 'filmy' moments".

Rajeev Masand of CNN-IBN rated it 3.5/5 and said, "In the end, Raajneeti is thrilling and gripping for the most part, even though it does lose steam in its final act. And as far as politics goes, it doesn't tell you very much more than you didn't already know." He continued, "For the superb acting, and for the exciting dramatic highs, it's a film I recommend you do not miss." Raja Sen of Rediff.com gave a 1.5 out of 5 star rating explaining that it is "essentially Sarkar Raj (2008) minus Amitabh Bachchan, is a hyperactive drama given to much yelling and little thought. The screenplay is weak, manipulative and every possible kind of lazy, with an omniscient narrator who vanishes after a while, a slew of unbelievably one-note characters, clunky dialogue that often lapses into something from period cinema, and bloody deaths thrown in every few scenes to kickstart the drama in this exhausting 3-hour film."

Rachel Saltz of The New York Times said, "Raajneeti, with its large cast of characters and wealth of subplots, is often a mess, but an interesting one." She also said, "The film – full of romance, intrigue and fraternal strife – is too diffuse to score political points. Or to have much impact." Robert Abele of the Los Angeles Times found that while it aimed "for something trenchant about thwarted destiny and ugly ambition in modern Indian democracy", it "mostly winds up with a convoluted and tonally awkward Godfather rehash, with nary a character worth rooting for" and that "Kapoor's performance is stony rather than calculating...." Frank Lovece of Film Journal International said, "More pulpy than political, this Godfather-ripoff Hindi electoral drama is a candidate for oblivion in U.S. theatres. ... It all eventually becomes so ridiculous and over-the-top violent that there is nobody, nobody, to root for."

On the review aggregator website Rotten Tomatoes, 22% of 9 critics' reviews are positive.

== Box office ==
Rajneeti grossed ₹145.5 crore (US$15 million) worldwide and was declared a superhit at the box office.

=== India ===
Raajneeti recorded an opening of nearly ₹10 crore net on its first day. It had the second highest Friday opening in India after 3 Idiots and the highest Friday opening in the first half of the year, surpassing Kites. It collected ₹ 34 crore at the end of the weekend and set a record for biggest weekend in the first half of the year, surpassing Housefull. It showed no major decline in business on Tuesday and collected ₹5.85 crore. At the end of the first week, the film collected ₹54.75 crore and set a record for biggest week in the first half of the year beating Housefull. Raajneeti sustained well in the second weekend and collected ₹16.25 crore. Raajneeti nett grossed ₹929.3 million (US$9.7 million) in India with a distributor share of ₹487.2 million (US$5.1 million).

=== Overseas ===
Overseas, the film opened to a weekend business of $2.25 million. In the U.S., Raajneeti played well for a limited release, noted Ray Subers of BoxOfficeMojo.com, grossing $850,244 on 124 screens its opening weekend, "which was good for first among limited releases and 11th place on the overall weekend chart." He specified that Raajneeti "became the third Bollywood film this year to lead all limited releases in its first weekend," following My Name is Khan and Kites. In Australia and New Zealand, Raajneeti surpassed the opening weekend record set by 3 Idiots (2009).

== Awards and nominations ==
56th Filmfare Awards:

Nominated

- Best Actor – Ranbir Kapoor
- Best Supporting Actor – Arjun Rampal
- Best Supporting Actor – Manoj Bajpayee
- Best Supporting Actor – Nana Patekar

12th IIFA Awards:

Won

- Best Supporting Actor – Arjun Rampal

Nominated

- Best Film – Prakash Jha
- Best Supporting Actor – Ranbir Kapoor
- Best Actress – Katrina Kaif
- Best Supporting Actor – Manoj Bajpayee

17th Screen Awards:

Won

- Best Screenplay – Prakash Jha, Anjum Rajabali
- Best Background Music – Wayne Sharp

Nominated

- Best Actor – Ajay Devgn
- Best Supporting Actor – Ranbir Kapoor
- Best Villain – Manoj Bajpayee

6th Producers Guild Film Awards:

Won

- Best Supporting Actor – Arjun Rampal

Nominated

- Best Film – Prakash Jha
- Best Actor – Ajay Devgn
- Best Actor – Ajay Devgn
- Best Villain – Manoj Bajpai
- Best Lyricist – Sameer for "Mora Piya"
- Best Male Playback Singer – Aadesh Shrivastava (for "Mora Piya")
- Best Story – Prakash Jha
- Best Screenplay – Anjum Rajabali & Prakash Jha
- Best Dialogue – Prakash Jha

2011 Zee Cine Awards:

Won

- Best Supporting Actor – Arjun Rampal

Nominated

- Best Film
- Best Supporting Actor – Ranbir Kapoor
- Best Actress – Katrina Kaif

3rd Mirchi Music Awards:

Nominated

- Male Vocalist of The Year – Aadesh Shrivastava (for "Mora Piya")
- Upcoming Female Vocalist of The Year – Antara Mitra (for "Bheegi Si Bhaagi Si")
- Song representing Sufi tradition – "Mora Piya"
- Best Programmer & Arranger of the Year – Amar Makwana, Mani Iyer and Sandeep Chatterjie (for "Mora Piya")
- Best Background Score of the Year – Wayne Sharpe

== Controversy ==
Raajneeti was first denied a certificate by the censor board of India for their thought that the lead character played by Katrina Kaif is inspired fully or partially by the Congress Party's chief Sonia Gandhi and Rashtriya Janata Dal's chief Rabri Devi. Director Prakash Jha dismissed this allegation, saying his only inspiration was Mahabharata, an epic from ancient India. References to electronic voting machines and parts of the film suggesting that women have to compromise to get ahead in politics, crude dialogues about the Muslim community and some intimate scenes and excessive violence were removed before giving the film a U/A censor certificate.

== Soundtrack ==
The score was composed by Wayne Sharpe while the soundtrack was composed by Wayne Sharpe, Pritam, Aadesh Shrivastava and Shantanu Moitra. The lyrics were written by Irshad Kamil, Gulzar, Sameer and Swanand Kirkire. The soundtrack consists of five original songs and four remixes. It was released on 12 May 2010. The songs "Mora Piya" and "Bheegi Si Bhaagi Si" went on to be chartbusters of 2010.
