= Moksha (2001 film) =

2001 Indian film by Ashok Mehta

- Film poster
- Directed by: Ashok Mehta
- Screenplay by: Hriday Lani; Raj Marbros
- Dialogues by: Hriday Lani
- Story by: Ashok Mehta
- Produced by: Ashok Mehta; Neerja Mehta
- Starring: Arjun Rampal; Manisha Koirala
- Cinematography: Ashok Mehta
- Edited by: Nandu
- Music by: Songs: Rajesh Roshan; Score: Salim–Sulaiman
- Production company: Ashok Mehta Visuals Pvt. Ltd
- Release date: 30 November 2001
- Country: India
- Language: Hindi
- Budget: ₹5 crore
- Box office: ₹82 lakh

Moksha: Salvation is a 2001 Indian Hindi-language crime drama film produced and directed by Ashok Mehta in his directorial debut. The film stars Arjun Rampal and Manisha Koirala. The film won the award for Best Cinematography and Best Audiography at the 48th National Film Awards.

== Plot ==
The story revolves around Vikram Saigal, a law graduate who is dissatisfied with his current situation. He is an idealist and aspires to fight against corruption and societal issues to make a change in the world. Hritika, a young girl, is enamored with him and tries to win his heart. At first, Vikram rejects her advances, but after she presents him with an expensive painting, they become a couple.

Vikram's idealism leads him to want to establish a free legal service for the poor. However, he finds it difficult to find like-minded lawyers to support his cause. His father and boss think he is too young and naive to understand the ramifications of providing free legal services, and he becomes more disillusioned. Eventually, he plans to rob a bank to obtain the money needed to establish his free legal institute.

Together with Hritika, Vikram hatches a plot to rob a bank. Hritika keeps getting nightmares about the robbery and tells her friend about it who suggests her to not go for it. On the day of the planned robbery, an informant alerts the bank authorities, causing them to be on high alert. Vikram suspects Hritika as she was the only know who knew about the plan, and kills her during their date.

A courtroom battle ensues, with Vikram representing himself, court find him not guilty. After the verdict, Hritika's best friend reveals that she, not Hritika, was the informant who alerted the bank. Overcome with guilt, Vikram attempts to take his own life but is unable to do so. He decides to rob the bank again, this time with an unloaded gun. He enters the bank with the intention of sacrificing himself, and ultimately dies from a gunshot wound by cops.

== Cast ==
- Arjun Rampal as Vikram Saigal
- Manisha Koirala as Hritika Sanyal
- Naseeruddin Shah as Dean
- Kalpana Pandit as Neelima, Ritika's roommate.
- Suresh Oberoi as Mr. Saigal, Vikram's father.
- Shubhangi Gokhale as Mrs Saigal, Vikram's mother.
- Paresh Rawal as Sharan Mama, Vikram's maternal uncle.
- Sushma Seth as Naani Maa, Ritika's maternal grandmother.
- Danny Denzongpa as Bachelor Simon
- Farida Jalal as Salim's mother
- Mohan Gokhale as Behram
- Kiran Kumar as Head Lawyer Gorakh
- Saurabh Shukla as Peon Office Kale
- Gulshan Grover as Prosecutor Rakesh Mehra
- Archana Puran Singh as Landlady Mrs D'Souza
- Sulabha Deshpande as eyewitness
- Kamal Chopra as Rich Guy

== Production ==
In 1995, cinematographer Ashok Mehta decided to turn director with a film that would star Sanjay Dutt in the lead role. However, Dutt was unable to act in it due to his legal court case proceedings, and Mehta opted for another actor. John Abraham was considered for the role before Arjun Rampal was selected for the protagonist at the recommendation of Shekhar Kapur. Manisha Koirala was signed as the heroine.

Mehta began filming Moksha in 1997 but financial issues kept delaying the shooting. It took several years to complete the film.

== Soundtrack ==
Moksha

Soundtrack album by Rajesh Roshan
- Genre: Feature film soundtrack
- Label: Venus Records & Tapes

All tracks was composed by Rajesh Roshan and lyrics penned by Javed Akhtar except "Jaan Leva" which was written by Shravan Sinha. Duo composer Salim–Sulaiman had provided four instrumental tracks for this album. The full album was released on 9 September 2001.

#	Title	Singer(s)	Music	Length
1	"Jaan Leva"	Sukhwinder Singh, Kavita Krishnamurthy	Rajesh Roshan	5:41
2	"Humko Pyar Hai"	Kamaal Khan, Sneha Pant	Rajesh Roshan	8:31
3	"Mohabbat Zindagi Hai"	Madhushree	Rajesh Roshan	5:50
4	"Nani Maa"	Dominique Cerejo	Rajesh Roshan	7:26
5	"Seep Mein Moti" (Female)	Pamela Jain	Rajesh Roshan	5:22
6	"Nani Maa" (Lori)	Mahalakshmi Iyer	Rajesh Roshan	5:17
7	"Seep Mein Moti" (Male)	Shaan	Rajesh Roshan	5:26
8	"Jaan Leva" (Remix)	Sukhwinder Singh, Kavita Krishnamurthy	Rajesh Roshan	4:30
9	"Beautiful World"	Instrumental	Salim–Sulaiman	
10	"Beginning of The End"	Instrumental	Salim–Sulaiman	
11	"Change Is The Only Constant"	Instrumental	Salim–Sulaiman	
12	"Salvation"	Instrumental	Salim–Sulaiman	

== Reception ==
=== Box office ===
The film was a box-office bomb, grossing ₹ 8.2 million against a ₹ 50 million production budget. Film trade analyst Taran Adarsh believed that circulation of pirated VCDs much before the film's theatrical release hampered its box-office prospects greatly.

=== Critical response ===
Writing for Bollywood Hungama, Taran Adarsh gave the film one star, writing, "On the whole, MOKSHA is a dry and dull film that won't find flavour with the audience." He praised Anil Mehta's cinematography and Rampal's performance saying "Arjun Rampal excels in a role availability that was difficult to portray. He takes giant strides as a performer and proves that he's an actor with an amazing range." Priyanka Bhattacharya of Rediff.com called it "Arjun's 70 mm portfolio!" by stating "Moksha was supposed to be Arjun Rampal's debut film. The director has taken special care to present it just that way. The camera has focused on Arjun the way a painter would on his muse. In that sense, Moksha is more a 70-mm portfolio for Arjun Rampal than a story."

=== Awards ===
Ashok Mehta won National Film Award for Best Cinematography at 48th National Film Awards, the jury stated "For providing wide range of tonal variation and outstanding compositions to cater to the changing moods of the film's narrative." The film also won Best Audiography award.
