= Manoj Bajpayee filmography =

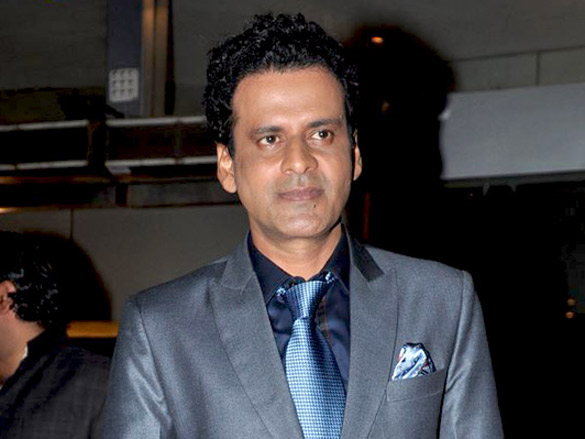
Bajpayee in 2011.

Manoj Bajpayee is an Indian actor known for his work in Hindi cinema. He played minor roles in Bandit Queen (1994), directed by Shekhar Kapur, and Drohkaal (1994). His breakthrough came when he played a gangster in Ram Gopal Varma's Satya (1998), for which he won the National Film Award for Best Actor in a Supporting Role and Filmfare Critics Award for Best Actor. He went on to star in Kaun? (1999), and Shool (1999), the latter of which won him his second Filmfare Critics Award for Best Actor.

Bajpayee won the Special Jury National Film Award for Pinjar (2003). He subsequently gained recognition for his roles in Raajneeti (2010), Aarakshan (2011), Chakravyuh (2012), the critically acclaimed two-part crime films Gangs of Wasseypur (2012), Special 26 (2013), Shootout at Wadala (2013), Satyagraha (2013), Aligarh (2015), Naam Shabana (2017), Sonchiriya (2019), and Gulmohar (2023). In 2018, he won the National Film Award for Best Actor for Bhonsle. Since 2019, he has starred in the thriller series The Family Man, directed by Raj and DK.

== Films ==
Year	Title	Role	Notes
1994	Bandit Queen	Dacoit Man Singh	
1994	Drohkaal	Anand	
1996	Dastak	Avinash Banerjee	
1996	Sanshodhan	Bhanwar	First lead role
1997	Tamanna	Salim	
1997	Daud	Pushkar	
1998	Satya	Bhiku Mhatre	
1999	Prema Katha	Sankaram	Telugu film
1999	Kaun	Sameer A. Purnavale	
1999	Shool	Inspector Samar Pratap Singh	
2000	Fiza	Murad Khan	
2000	Dil Pe Mat Le Yaar	Ram Saran Pandey	
2000	Ghaath	Krishna Patil	
2001	Zubeidaa	Maharaja Vijayendra Singh	
2001	Aks	Raghavan Ghatge	
2002	Road	Babu	
2003	Pinjar	Rashid	
2003	LOC Kargil	Yogendra Singh Yadav	
2004	Hanan	Pagla / Shamsher	
2004	Jaago	Inspector Kripa Shankar Thakur	
2004	Veer-Zaara	Raza Sharazi	
2004	Inteqam: The Perfect Game	ACP Uday Dhirendra Thakur	
2005	Return to Rajapur	Jai Singh	
2005	Bewafaa	Dil Arora	
2005	Fareb	Aditya Malhotra	
2006	Happy	DCP Arvind	Telugu film
2007	1971	Major Suraj Singh	
2007	Swami	Swami	
2007	Dus Kahaniyaan	Saahil	Anthology film; segment: Zahir
2008	Money Hai Toh Honey Hai	Lallabhai Bharodia	
2009	Jugaad	Sandip	
2009	Acid Factory	Sultan	
2009	Jail	Nawab	
2010	Puli	Al Saleem	Telugu film
2010	Vedam	Raheemuddin Qureshi	Telugu film
2010	Raajneeti	Veerendra Pratap	
2010	Ramayana: The Epic	Rama	Voiceover
2010	Dus Tola	Shankar Sunar	
2011	Aarakshan	Mithilesh Singh	
2011	Lanka	Jaswant Sisodia	
2012	Chittagong	Surya Sen	
2012	Gangs of Wasseypur – Part 1	Sardar Khan	
2012	Gangs of Wasseypur – Part 2	Sardar Khan	
2012	Chakravyuh	Rajan	
2013	Samar	Rajesh Arunachalam	Tamil film
2013	Special 26	CBI Officer Waseem Khan	
2013	Shootout at Wadala	Shabir Ibrahim Kaskar	
2013	Satyagraha	Balram Singh	
2013	Mahabharat	Yudhisthira	Voiceover
2014	Anjaan	Imran Bhai	Tamil film
2015	Tevar	Gajendar Singh	
2015	Jai Hind	Husband	Short film
2016	Taandav	Tambe	Short film
2016	Aligarh	Ramchandra Siras	
2016	Traffic	Constable Ramdas Godbole	
2016	Budhia Singh – Born to Run	Biranchi Das	
2016	Saat Uchakkey	Pappi	
2016	Kriti	Sapan	Short film
2016	Ouch	Vinay	Short film
2017	Naam Shabana	Ranveer Singh	
2017	Sarkar 3	Govind Deshpande	
2017	Rukh	Divakar Mathur	
2018	Aiyaary	Colonel Abhay Singh	
2018	Baaghi 2	DIG Ajay Shergill	
2018	Missing	Sushant Dubey	Also producer
2018	Satyameva Jayate	DCP Shivansh Rathod	
2018	Gali Guleiyan	Khuddoos	
2018	Love Sonia	Faizal	
2018	Bhonsle	Ganpath Bhonsle	Also producer
2019	Sonchiriya	Man Singh	
2020	Mrs. Serial Killer	Dr. Mrityunjoy Mukerjee	
2020	Suraj Pe Mangal Bhari	Detective Madhu Mangal Rane	
2021	Silence... Can You Hear It?	ACP Avinash Verma	
2021	Dial 100	Nikhil Sood	
2023	Gulmohar	Arun Batra	
2023	Sirf Ek Bandaa Kaafi Hai	Advocate P. C. Solanki	
2023	Joram	Dasru	
2024	Silence 2: The Night Owl Bar Shootout	ACP Avinash Verma	
2024	Bhaiyya Ji	Bhaiya Ji	
2024	Jugnuma: The Fable	Dev	
2024	Despatch	Joy Bag	ZEE5 film
2025	Inspector Zende	Zende	Netflix film
2026	Governor	A. Ramanan	
2026	Last Man in Tower	Yogesh Mishra aka Masterji	
2026	Gajab Raat	SI Ajay Dixit	Netflix film
TBA	Police Station Mein Bhoot †	TBA	Filming

== Television ==
Year	Title	Role	Notes
1991	Suno Re Kissa		
1995	Imtihaan	N/A	
1995	Swabhimaan	Sunil	
1996	Badalte Rishte	Arvind Verma	
2005–2006	Kam Ya Zyaada	Host	
2019–present	The Family Man	Srikant Tiwari	
2021	Secrets Of Sinauli	Narrator	Documentary
2021	Ray	Musafir Ali	Segment: Hungama Hai Kyon Barpa
2022	Secrets of the Kohinoor	Narrator	Documentary
2023	Farzi	Srikant Tiwari	Voiceover
2024	Killer Soup	Prabhakar/Umesh	

== Music videos ==
Title	Year	Role	Notes	Ref.
"Bambai Main Ka Ba"	2020	Himself	Also singer	
"Kudi Meri"	2022			
