= List of awards and nominations received by Manoj Bajpayee =

Manoj Bajpayee awards and nominations
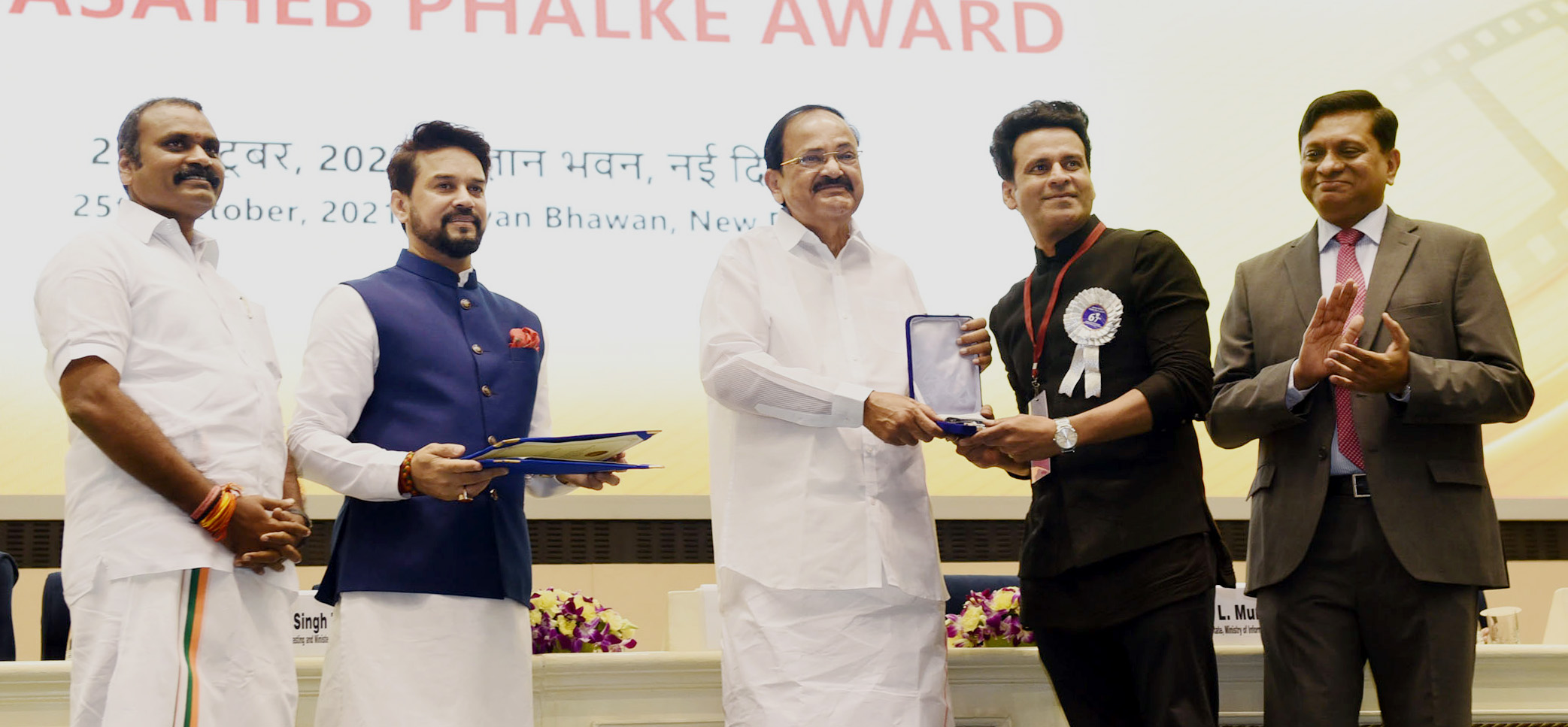
- Bajpayee receiving National Award for Bhonsle (2021)
Awards and nominations (Note: Awards in certain categories do not have prior nominations and only winners are announced by the jury. For simplification and to avoid errors, each award in this list has been presumed to have had a prior nomination.)
Award	Wins	Nominations
Totals
Asia Pacific Screen Awards	2	3
International Indian Film Academy Awards	0	5
Filmfare Awards	4	11
Filmfare OTT Awards	2	6
National Film Awards	4	4
Screen Awards	2	6
Zee Cine Awards	2	3
Other awards	6	21
Wins	41
Nominations	59

Manoj Bajpayee is an Indian actor who predominantly works in Hindi cinema. He is the recipient of four National Film Awards, four Filmfare Awards, and two Asia Pacific Screen Awards. In 2019, he was awarded India's fourth-highest civilian honour, the Padma Shri, for his contributions to art.

== Major associations ==
=== Asia Pacific Screen Awards⁣ ===
Year⁣	Work⁣	Category⁣	Result⁣	Ref.⁣
2012	Gangs of Wasseypur⁣	Best Performance by an Actor⁣	Nominated⁣	⁣
2016	Aligarh⁣	Best Performance by an Actor⁣	Won⁣	⁣
2019	Bhonsle⁣	Best Performance by an Actor⁣	Won⁣	⁣

=== Filmfare Awards ⁣ ===
Year⁣	Work⁣	Category⁣	Result⁣	Ref.⁣
1999⁣	Satya⁣	Best Supporting Actor⁣	Nominated⁣	
1999⁣	Satya⁣	Best Actor (Critics)⁣	Won⁣	
2000⁣	Shool⁣	Best Actor (Critics)⁣	Won⁣	
2000⁣	Shool⁣	Best Actor⁣	Nominated⁣	
2002⁣	Aks⁣	Best Performance in a Negative Role⁣	Nominated⁣	⁣
2003⁣	Road⁣	Best Performance in a Negative Role⁣	Nominated⁣	⁣
2004⁣	LOC: Kargil⁣	Best Supporting Actor⁣	Nominated⁣	⁣
2011	Raajneeti⁣	Best Supporting Actor⁣	Nominated⁣	⁣
2013⁣	Gangs of Wasseypur⁣	Best Actor⁣	Nominated⁣	⁣
2017⁣	Aligarh	Best Actor (Critics)	Won⁣ (Note: Tied with Shahid Kapoor for Udta Punjab)	
2017⁣	Taandav⁣⁣	Best Actor In A Short Film⁣⁣	Won⁣	
2024	Joram	Best Actor (Critics)	Nominated	

=== Filmfare OTT Awards⁣ ===
Year⁣	Work⁣	Category⁣	Result⁣	Ref.⁣
2020	Bhonsle	Best Actor in A Web Original Film	Nominated	
2020	The Family Man 1⁣	Best Actor In A Drama Series	Nominated	
2020	The Family Man 1⁣	Best Actor In A Drama Series (Critics)⁣	Won⁣	
2021	Ray⁣	Best Actor in A Web Original Film⁣	Nominated	
2021	The Family Man 2⁣	Best Actor In A Drama Series	Nominated	
2021	The Family Man 2⁣	Best Actor In A Drama Series (Critics)⁣	Won⁣	
2023	Sirf Ek Bandaa Kaafi Hai⁣	Best Actor In Web Original Film	Won	
2023	Gulmohar	Best Actor In Web Original Film	Nominated⁣	

=== IIFA Awards⁣ ===
Year⁣	Work⁣	Category⁣	Result⁣	Ref.⁣
2001⁣	Fiza⁣	Best Performance in a Negative Role	Nominated⁣	
2002⁣	Aks	Best Performance in a Negative Role	Nominated	
2011⁣	Raajneeti	Best Performance in a Negative Role	Nominated	
2011⁣	Raajneeti	Best Supporting Actor	Nominated	
2013⁣	Gangs of Wasseypur	Best Actor	Nominated	
2022	Bhonsle	Best Actor	Nominated	

=== National Film Awards ⁣ ===
Year⁣	Work⁣	Category⁣	Result⁣	Ref.⁣
1999⁣	Satya⁣	Best Supporting Actor⁣	Won⁣	⁣
2004⁣	Pinjar⁣	Special Jury Award (Feature Film)⁣	Won⁣	
2021⁣	Bhonsle⁣	Best Actor⁣	Won⁣ (Note: Tied with Dhanush for Asuran)	
2024⁣	Gulmohar	Special Mention	Won	

=== Producers Guild Film Awards⁣ ===
Year⁣	Work⁣	Category⁣	Result⁣	Ref.⁣
2011	Raajneeti⁣	Best Actor in a Negative Role⁣	Nominated⁣	
2013	Gangs of Wasseypur⁣	Best Actor in a Leading Role⁣	Nominated⁣	
2016	Tevar⁣	Best Actor in a Negative Role⁣	Nominated⁣	

=== Screen Awards⁣ ===
Year⁣	Work⁣	Category⁣	Result⁣	Ref.⁣
1999	Satya⁣	Best Supporting Actor⁣	Won⁣	
2002⁣	Aks⁣	Best Actor in a Negative Role⁣	Won⁣	
2003⁣	Road⁣	Best Actor in a Negative Role⁣	Nominated⁣	
2004	Pinjar⁣	Best Supporting Actor⁣	Nominated⁣	
2013⁣	Gangs of Wasseypur⁣	Best Actor⁣	Nominated⁣	
2017⁣	Aligarh⁣	Best Actor (Critics)⁣	Nominated⁣	

=== Zee Cine Awards⁣ ===
Year⁣	Work⁣	Category⁣	Result⁣	Ref.⁣
1999	Satya⁣	Best Actor in a Supporting Role – Male⁣	Won⁣	
2002⁣	Aks⁣	Best Performance in a Negative Role⁣	Won⁣	
2017⁣	Aligarh⁣	Best Actor (Critics)⁣	Nominated⁣	

== Other awards ==
Year⁣	Award	Work⁣	Category⁣	Result⁣	Ref.⁣
2020	Asian Academy Creative Awards	Best Actor in a Leading Role	The Family Man	Nominated	
2021	Asian Academy Creative Awards	Best Actor in a Leading Role	The Family Man	Nominated	
2016	Indian Film Festival of Melbourne	Best Actor	Aligarh	Nominated	
2018	Indian Film Festival of Melbourne	Best Actor	Gali Guleiyan	Nominated	
2019	Indian Film Festival of Melbourne	Best Actor	Bhonsle	Nominated	
2021	Indian Film Festival of Melbourne	Best Actor in a Series	The Family Man	Won	
2023	Indian Film Festival of Melbourne	Best Actor	Joram	Nominated	
2023	Indian Film Festival of Melbourne	Best Actor	Gulmohar	Nominated	
2017	FOI Online Awards	Best Actor in a Leading Role	Aligarh	Nominated	
2019	FOI Online Awards	Best Actor in a Leading Role	Gali Guleiyan	Nominated	
2020	FOI Online Awards	Best Performance by an Ensemble Cast	Sonchiriya	Won	
2021	FOI Online Awards	Best Actor in a Leading Role	Bhonsle	Won	
2016	Jagran Film Festival	Aligarh	Best Actor	Won (Note: Tied with Randeep Hooda for Sarbjit)	
2018	New York Indo-American Arts Council Film Festival	Gali Guleiyan	Best Actor	Won	
2011	Stardust Awards	Best Supporting Actor	Raajneeti	Nominated	
2013	Stardust Awards	Best Actor	Gangs of Wasseypur	Won	
2016	Stardust Awards	Best Performance by an Actor in a Negative Role	Tevar	Nominated	
2017	Stardust Awards	Best Actor	Aligarh	Nominated	
