= Filmfare Award for Best Performance in a Negative Role =

Indian film award

The Filmfare Best Villain Award is given by Filmfare as part of its annual Filmfare Awards for Hindi films, to recognise an actor who had delivered an outstanding performance in a negative role.

Although the awards started in 1954, this category was not introduced until 1992. It has been marked as obsolete since 2007.

== Superlatives ==
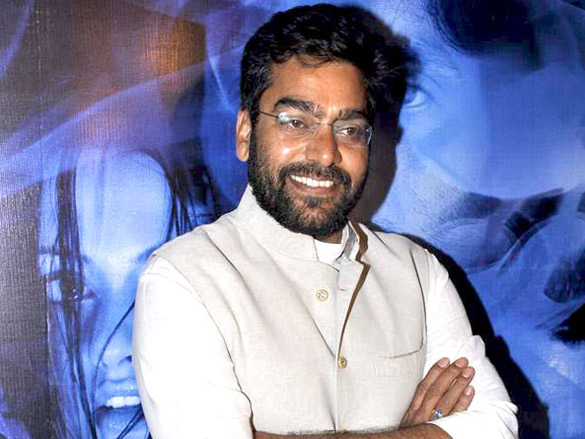
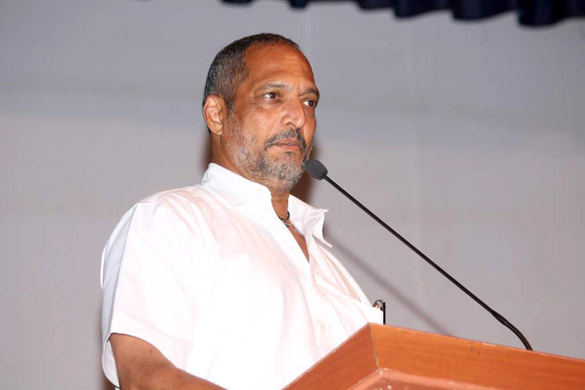
Ashutosh Rana (l) and Nana Patekar (r) hold the record for the maximum wins in this category.

Category	Name	Superlative	Notes
Most Awards	Ashutosh Rana	2 awards	From 2 nominations
Most Awards	Nana Patekar	2 awards	From 3 nominations
Most Nominations	Amrish Puri	7 nominations	0 awards
Most Nominations without a Win	Amrish Puri	7 nominations	–

Ashutosh Rana is the only actor to have won the Best Villain award in consecutive years, receiving the honor in 1998 and 1999. Amrish Puri received nominations in this category for three consecutive years, from 1991 to 1993. In 1994, Danny Denzongpa became the only actor to be nominated twice in the same year, although he did not win.

Abhishek Bachchan and Priyanka Chopra are the only actors to have received nominations in another acting category alongside Best Villain for the same performance. Bachchan was nominated for Best Supporting Actor for Yuva, while Chopra received a nomination for Best Supporting Actress for Aitraaz. Moreover, both actors were nominated in their respective categories in the same year (2004).

In 1997, Kajol became the first female actor to win the Best Villain award for her performance in Gupt: The Hidden Truth. She and Priyanka Chopra (Aitraaz, 2004) are the only female actors to have won in this category. Other female nominees include Urmila Matondkar (Pyaar Tune Kya Kiya, 2001), Shabana Azmi (Makdee, 2002), Bipasha Basu (Jism, 2003), Preity Zinta (Armaan, 2003), and Amrita Singh (Kalyug, 2005).

Preity Zinta is also the only actor to have been nominated for both Best Actress and Best Villain in the same year, for her role in Armaan (2003).

=== Multiple wins ===
Wins	Recipient
2	Ashutosh Rana
2	Nana Patekar

=== Multiple nominations ===
Nominations	Recipient
7	Amrish Puri
5	Danny Denzongpa
4	Naseeruddin Shah
3	Shah Rukh Khan, Ajay Devgn, Nana Patekar
2	Ashish Vidyarthi, Milind Gunaji, Sadashiv Amrapurkar, Manoj Bajpayee, Suniel Shetty, John Abraham

== Winners and nominees ==
In the list below, the winner of the award for each year is shown first, followed by the other nominees. The films are listed by the years when the award was presented.

=== 1990s ===
Year	Photos of winners	Actor	Role(s)	Film	Ref.
1992 (37th)		Sadashiv Amrapurkar ‡	Maharani	Sadak	
1992 (37th)		Amrish Puri	Chuniya Chand Chaukhan a.k.a. Chuniya Mama	Saudagar	
1992 (37th)		Danny Dengzongpa	Bhaktawar	Hum	
1992 (37th)		Om Puri	Suraj Narayan Singh a.k.a. Baapji	Narsimha	
1992 (37th)		Raza Murad	Daroga Shahbaz Khan	Henna	
1993 (38th)		Nana Patekar ‡	Majid Khan	Angaar	
1993 (38th)		Amrish Puri	General Dong	Tahalka	
1993 (38th)		Kiran Kumar	Pasha	Khuda Gawah	
1994 (39th)		Paresh Rawal ‡	Velji	Sir	
1994 (39th)		Amrish Puri	Barrister Indrajit Chaddha	Damini	
1994 (39th)		Gulshan Grover	Chhappan Tikli a.k.a. Jimmy	Sir	
1994 (39th)		Raj Babbar	Jagannath Tripathi	Dalaal	
1994 (39th)		Shah Rukh Khan	Rahul Mehra	Darr	
1995 (40th)		Shah Rukh Khan ‡	Vijay Agnihotri	Anjaam	
1995 (40th)		Danny Denzongpa	Chatur Singh Chitah	Krantiveer	
1995 (40th)		Danny Denzongpa	Dilawar Singh	Vijaypath	
1995 (40th)		Naseeruddin Shah	Mr. Jindal	Mohra	
1996 (41st)		Mithun Chakraborty ‡	Amavas a.k.a. Vijay Bahadur Kunwar / Police Inspector Kranti Kumar	Jallaad	
1996 (41st)		Amrish Puri	Durjan Singh	Karan Arjun	
1996 (41st)		Ashish Vidyarthi	Commander Bhadra	Drohkaal	
1996 (41st)		Danny Denzongpa	ACP Negi	Barsaat	
1996 (41st)		Mohan Agashe	Kooka	Trimurti	
1997 (42nd)		Arbaaz Khan ‡	Vikram	Daraar	
1997 (42nd)		Ashish Vidyarthi	Ramanbhai	Is Raat Ki Subah Nahin	
1997 (42nd)		Danny Denzongpa	Katya	Ghatak	
1997 (42nd)		Milind Gunaji	Indrajeet Saxena	Fareb	
1997 (42nd)		Naseeruddin Shah	Ajay Narang	Chaahat	
1998 (43rd)		Kajol ‡	Isha Diwan	Gupt: The Hidden Truth	
1998 (43rd)		Aditya Pancholi	Siddharth Chaudhary	Yes Boss	
1998 (43rd)		Milind Gunaji	Bali Thakur	Virasat	
1998 (43rd)		Amrish Puri	Raja Sahab	Koyla	
1998 (43rd)		Sadashiv Amrapurkar	Ranjit Rai	Ishq	
1999 (44th)		Ashutosh Rana ‡	Gokul Pandit	Dushman	
1999 (44th)		Govind Namdev	Thakurdas Jhawle a.k.a. Bhau	Satya	
1999 (44th)		Mukesh Tiwari	Jageera	China Gate	
1999 (44th)		Shah Rukh Khan	Manu Dada	Duplicate	
1999 (44th)		Sharat Saxena	Raunak "Ronnie" Singh	Ghulam	

=== 2000s ===
Year	Photos of winners	Actor	Role(s)	Film	Ref.
2000 (45th)		Ashutosh Rana ‡	Lajja Shankar Pandey	Sangharsh	
2000 (45th)		Amrish Puri	Surya Singh Thapar	Baadshah	
2000 (45th)		Naseeruddin Shah	Gulfam Hassan	Sarfarosh	
2000 (45th)		Rahul Bose	Sunny	Thakshak	
2000 (45th)		Sayaji Shinde	Bacchu "Bhaiyyaji" Yadav	Shool	
2001 (46th)		Suniel Shetty ‡	Dev Ranjan Chopra	Dhadkan	
2001 (46th)		Govinda	Om Srivastav / Mahendra Pratap Singhania	Shikari	
2001 (46th)		Jackie Shroff	Hilal Kohistani	Mission Kashmir	
2001 (46th)		Rahul Dev	Naseer Ahmed	Champion	
2001 (46th)		Sharad Kapoor	Prakash Sharma	Josh	
2002 (47th)		Akshay Kumar ‡	Vikram "Vicky" Bajaj	Ajnabee	
2002 (47th)		Aftab Shivdasani	Shekhar Saxena	Kasoor	
2002 (47th)		Amrish Puri	Mayor Ashraf Ali	Gadar: Ek Prem Katha	
2002 (47th)		Manoj Bajpayee	Raghavan Ghatge	Aks	
2002 (47th)		Urmila Matondkar	Ria Jaiswal	Pyaar Tune Kya Kiya	
2003 (48th)		Ajay Devgn ‡	Tarang / Ranjeet Bharadwaj	Deewangee	
2003 (48th)		Akshaye Khanna	Karan Malhotra	Humraaz	
2003 (48th)		Manoj Bajpayee	Babu	Road	
2003 (48th)		Nana Patekar	Narsimha	Shakti: The Power	
2003 (48th)		Shabana Azmi	Makdee	Makdee	
2004 (49th)		Irrfan Khan ‡	Ranvijay Singh	Haasil	
2004 (49th)		Bipasha Basu	Sonia Khanna	Jism	
2004 (49th)		Feroz Khan	Saba Karim Shah	Janasheen	
2004 (49th)		Preity Zinta	Sonia Sinha	Armaan	
2004 (49th)		Yashpal Sharma	Sunder Yadav	Gangaajal	
2005 (50th)		Priyanka Chopra ‡	Sonia Roy	Aitraaz	
2005 (50th)		Abhishek Bachchan	Lallan Singh	Yuva	
2005 (50th)		Ajay Devgn	Yashwant Angre	Khakee	
2005 (50th)		John Abraham	Kabir Sharma	Dhoom	
2005 (50th)		Suniel Shetty	Raghavan Singh Dutta	Main Hoon Na	
2006 (51st)		Nana Patekar ‡	Tabrez Alam	Apaharan	
2006 (51st)		Ajay Devgn	Kaali Pratap Singh	Kaal	
2006 (51st)		Amrita Singh	Simi Roy	Kalyug	
2006 (51st)		Kay Kay Menon	Vishnu Nagre	Sarkar	
2006 (51st)		Pankaj Kapoor	Himmat Mehndi / Jambwal	Dus	
2007 (52nd)		Saif Ali Khan ‡	Ishwar "Langda" Tyagi	Omkara	
2007 (52nd)		Boman Irani	Lucky Singh	Lage Raho Munna Bhai	
2007 (52nd)		Emraan Hashmi	Akash Kapadia	Gangster: A Love Story	
2007 (52nd)		John Abraham	Rohit Chopra	Zinda	
2007 (52nd)		Naseeruddin Shah	Dr. Siddhant Arya	Krrish	
2007 (52nd)		Irrfan Khan	Vikram / Roopchand Swaroopchand Solanki	The Killer	

== See also ==
- Filmfare Awards
- Bollywood
- Cinema of India
