= Bambai Main Ka Ba =

Single by Dr Sagar and Manoj Bajpayee

Single by Manoj Bajpayee
- Language: Bhojpuri
- Released: 9 September 2020
- Genre: Rap song
- Length: 6:21
- Label: T-Series
- Songwriter: Dr Sagar

Music video
- "Bambai Main Ka Ba" on YouTube

Bambai Main Ka Ba (transl. What's In The Mumbai) is a Bhojpuri song written by Dr Sagar and sung by Manoj Bajpayee. The video of the song is directed by Anubhav Sinha and the music is produced by Prasanna Suresh & Anurag Saikia. This song features Manoj Bajpayee, while he describes about the Mumbai city with a emotional rap song.

== Cast ==
- Manoj Bajpayee

== Music video ==
The music video titled "Bambai Main Ka Ba" was released by T-Series on YouTube on 9 September 2020. This is the debut music video of actor Manoj Bajpayee.

== Reception ==
The song has 10 million views on YouTube since its release.

== Personnel ==
- Song: Bambai Main Ka Ba
- Artist: Manoj Bajpayee
- Starring: Manoj Bajpayee
- Lyrics and Composition: Dr Sagar
- Music: Anurag Saikia
- Mixing and Mastering: Bhaskar Sarma Euphony Studio
- Video Director: Anubhav Sinha
- DOP: Soumik Mukherjee
- Label: T Series
