= P. C. Solanki =

Advocate from Rajasthan, India

Poonam Chand Solanki
- Occupation: Advocate
- Years active: 1996–present
- Known for: Asaram Bapu rape case (2013–2018)

Poonam Chand Solanki (also known as P. C. Solanki) is an Indian advocate from Jodhpur, Rajasthan. He is best known for successfully representing the victim in a multi-year trial of Asaram Bapu in 2013 Jodhpur rape case, which resulted in the self-styled godman's conviction and life imprisonment in 2018. His legal battle inspired the 2023 Hindi film Sirf Ek Bandaa Kaafi Hai.

== Early life and career ==
Poonam Chand Solanki's father was a retired railway mechanic. He attended a central school for primary education and joined the Bar Council of Rajasthan in 1996. He has practiced in various courts, including the High Court, Supreme Court, and Session Courts.

One of his early notable public interest litigations (PIL) was in 2002. He filed a PIL in the Rajasthan High Court against the immersion of Ganesh idols made from Plaster of Paris in Gulab Sagar, a lake near Jodhpur's historic Ghantaghar, due to the resulting pollution and death of aquatic life. The High Court subsequently banned the immersion of such idols in the lake. Solanki reportedly faced threats from some groups following this PIL.

=== Asaram Bapu rape case ===
Solanki gained national prominence for his role as the counsel for the minor victim in the sexual assault case against Asaram Bapu, which began in 2013. The victim's family approached him after being dissatisfied with the initial progress and unable to afford legal fees. Solanki took on the case pro bono, stating he was fighting for truth and justice rather than money.

Throughout the five-year trial (2013 – 2018), Solanki faced a defense team of prominent Indian lawyers such as Ram Jethmalani, Salman Khurshid, Subramanian Swamy, and K. T. S. Tulsi, who filed over ten bail applications—six in the trial court, three in the Rajasthan High Court, and two in the Supreme Court—all of which were denied. He reported receiving numerous threats and offers of bribes. The trial also saw attacks on key prosecution witnesses, with some being killed.

In April 2018, the Jodhpur Scheduled Caste and Scheduled Tribe Court found Asaram guilty of rape and sentenced him to life imprisonment. Solanki's efforts in securing the conviction were widely reported.

== Media portrayal ==
The 2023 Hindi film Sirf Ek Bandaa Kaafi Hai, starring Manoj Bajpayee, was inspired by Poonam Chand Solanki's legal battle in the Asaram case.

In May 2023, Solanki reportedly filed a lawsuit against the film's producers, alleging copyright violation and claiming that his intellectual property rights were violated as no No Objection Certificate (NOC) was obtained from him, and he did not review any script. He stated that the agreement he signed was for a biopic, and the rights were sold to another party without his knowledge. Solanki also expressed that he did not see himself as a "hero" but as a lawyer who discharged his duties.
