= Budhia Singh =

Indian long-distance runner

Personal information
- Nationality: Indian
- Born: 2002 (age 23–24) Bhubaneswar, Khurdha District, Odisha

Sport
- Sport: Marathon

Budhia Singh (born 2002) is an Indian long-distance runner who became notable for his athletic feats as a child. He has been acclaimed as the world's youngest marathon runner. He ran from Puri to Bhubaneswar at the age of five covering 65 kilometres (40 miles) in seven hours and two minutes and was listed as the world's youngest marathon runner in the 2006 edition of the Limca Book of Records, an Indian records book. He was given a Rajiv Gandhi Award for excellence in 2006.

== Early life ==
Budhia Singh was born in Orissa in 2002. His mother, Sukanti, works as a caretaker in a hostel at Kalinga Institute of Industrial Technology. His father died at an early age. He has three sisters: Rashmita, Nivedita and Sasmita.

As a consequence of their poverty, Budhia Singh was allegedly sold by his mother to a travelling salesman for ₹850 at the age of two. Because of the ill-treatment thereafter, his mother sought out Biranchi Das, a local judo coach and orphanage operator, and asked him to take the boy on. Biranchi reimbursed the salesman's purchase price of Singh and the child came to live with Das and his other orphans at a local Judo Hall. Singh's mother disputes this version of events, saying "We did not have anything but yet, I never sold [him]." Singh himself claims that he met Das after attending his sister's judo class, and that Das never ran an orphanage, although he did sometimes allow his students to stay at the gym.

One day, Das caught Singh hitting his sister, Sasmita. He punished him by making him run, but then forgot about him; he returned after five hours to find Singh was still running. After a medical check up his heart was found to be normal even after running for hours. He then began to train him to run marathons. By the age of four, Budhia had run and completed 50 marathons. After running a record-breaking marathon, Budhia was admitted to the SAI sports hostel in Bhubaneswar. However, he "felt like he was lodged in a jail." After staying in the hostel for almost nine years, Budhia is now at home, living with his mother, Sukanti Singh, and his sisters.

== Career and controversy ==
Budhia's running ability has led to celebrity status and he appeared in a number of television commercials. These commercials and Budhia's fame allegedly led to significant financial gains for Das, which led to accusations of exploitation. An inquiry by Indian child welfare officials was launched in January 2006; Das refuted the allegations.

A feature-length documentary called Marathon Boy was released in 2011 that focused on Singh and Das's relationship over a five-year period from 2006. The documentary was funded by HBO & BBC Storyville, and was nominated for an Emmy. In the film, Budhia makes a withdrawal of his accusations against Das.

Singh was no longer running long distances by the age of 13 in 2015, and was running one or two hours of conditional training per day. Singh himself has said that he would like to one day represent India at the Olympics in the men's marathon.

== Murder of Biranchi Das ==
Das was shot dead at Buxi Jagabandhu Bidyadhar College on the evening of 13 April 2008. According to police, Das was sitting inside the judo centre with friends after a training session at the time of the attack. Das's murder was not related to his treatment of Singh; it resulted after Das incurred the wrath of a gangster, Raja Acharya, after Das reportedly tried to defend a model, Leslie Tripathy, who was allegedly being harassed by Raja. Das's murderers, Sandeep Acharya (alias Raja), and his associate, Akshya Behera, (alias Chagala) were sentenced to life imprisonment in December 2010. The sports hostel Singh was staying at did not allow him to attend Das's funeral.

== Biographical film ==
A biographical film of Singh and Das's relationship, Budhia Singh – Born to Run, was directed by Soumendra Padhi and released in 2016. It starred Mayur Patole as Singh and Manoj Bajpayee as Das. The Film won the Best Children's Film award at the 63rd National Film Awards.
