= Shock (2010 film) =

- Official poster
- Directed by: H. S. Rajasekar
- Produced by: Amarchand Jain; Vijay Surana
- Starring: Ramesh Aravind; Suma Guha; Neenasam Ashwath
- Cinematography: Niranjan Babu
- Edited by: Sanjeeva Reddy
- Music by: M S Maruthi
- Production company: Sri Sankeshwara Films
- Release date: November 5, 2010
- Country: India
- Language: Kannada

Shock is a 2010 Indian Kannada-language psychological thriller film directed by H. S. Rajasekar. A remake of Kaun? (1999), the film stars Ramesh Aravind, Suma Guha and Neenasam Ashwath. The film was a box office failure.

== Cast ==
- Ramesh Aravind
- Suma Guha
- Neenasam Ashwath

== Soundtrack ==
The film features no songs and a background score by M S Maruthi.

== Reception ==
A critic from The Times of India wrote that "`Shock keeps everyone on the edge of their seats with an excellent script and brilliant narration from beginning to end". A critic from Deccan Herald wrote that "Shock doesn’t shock but entertains serious film buffs". V. S. Rajapur of Nowrunning wrote that "This remake of Kaun drags and a tedious watch".
