= Kam Ya Zyaada =

- Logo
- Directed by: Punit Goenka
- Presented by: Manoj Bajpai
- Country of origin: India

Production
- Running time: 60 minutes
- Production company: Optimystix Entertainment

Original release
- Network: Zee TV
- Release: 5 December 2005

Kam Ya Zyaada is an Indian quiz show that aired on Zee TV channel in December 2005. An adaptation of the Danish show Gimme Five, Kam Ya Zyaada has a Rs. 30 million top prize—one of the highest prizes among all the reality shows aired on Indian television networks. The prize is reduced to 3 contestants playing the second round and finally the highest money winner in the first 2 rounds plays round 3 for the Rs. 30 million jackpot. All the questions are only to be answered with either "Kam" (less) or "Zyaada" (more) – increasing the chances of winning to 50%. The series premiered on 5 December 2005 and was hosted by Manoj Bajpai.

== Rules ==
1st round: 'Pratham Chkra'
The round starts with 5 persons participating in the game and Manoj asking them 5 questions one at a time and they have to answer the questions in either "kam" or "zyaada". The contestants have 60 seconds for answering each question, the moment they answer the question, their remaining time out of 60 seconds is noted down and if their answer is correct, they get (remaining time) x Rs 1000. For example, if the contestants' time is 40 seconds, then that contestant wins Rs 40,000 (40 x 1000). After the completion of the first round, the top 3 contestants' go into the second round.

2nd round: 'Dwiteeya Chkra'
The second round contains 3 remaining contestants' who win the first round, dealing with 3 questions one at a time with the bidding option. If one contestant bids a question and he answers correctly, he gets the money; if he gives wrong answer, the bid amount is deducted from his balance. Nevertheless, if the contestant is uncertain about the answer, they can pass the question (risk of losing money) on to some other contestant. The contestant with top most score moves to the third and final round.

3rd round: 'Trateeya Chkra'
The top contestant with the highest score from round 2 plays the game in the 3rd round who has to answer 5 questions. After answering the questions, the contestant has to decide whether how many questions he/she answered correctly. Depending on the predictions of correct number of answers the prize money is given to the contestant. For example, if the contestant gives all 5 correct answers and predicts that he/she has given all 5 answers correctly, then he/she gets the prize money of "3 Crore" (30 Million).
