= Ramchandra Siras =

Indian linguist and author

Srinivas Ramchandra Siras
- Born: 1948; Nagpur, Maharashtra
- Died: 7 April 2010 (aged 61–62)
- Awards: Maharashtra Sahitya Parishad

Srinivas Ramchandra Siras (1948 – 7 April 2010) was an Indian linguist and author. He was a professor at the Aligarh Muslim University specializing in Marathi literature and head of the Department of Modern Indian Languages. The film Aligarh, directed by Hansal Mehta, is based on his life.

== Life ==
After school in Nagpur, Siras studied psychology and linguistics at Nagpur University in India. In 1985 he got his doctorate in Marathi and a master's in psychology. He finished university studies and became a professor at Aligarh Muslim University (AMU) in 1988.

Siras suffered from fits at a young age and was advised against marriage. When considered cured of the condition later in life he was married. The marriage lasted for nearly 20 years but ended in divorce after a long separation.

He wrote several short stories in the Marathi language. In 2002, he received the literary award from Maharashtra Sahitya Parishad for "Paya Khalchi Hirawal" (Grass under my feet).

=== Suspension ===
On 8 February 2010, two men forced their way into Siras' house while he was having consensual sex with another man. On 9 February 2010, Siras was suspended by AMU for "gross misconduct" after having been ambushed by a local TV channel's camera crew, while having sex with a rickshaw puller. The AMU public relations officer, Rahat Abrar, stated: "Siras was captured on camera having sex with a rickshaw-puller. He was placed under suspension by the order of the vice-chancellor, professor P. K. Abdul Aziz".

He won his case against the university in Allahabad High Court on 1 April 2010, and got back his job as professor, along with his accommodation, until his retirement. The case was exacerbated by the involvement of students in the covert taping and ambush of Siras and his lover. The case was fought on the premise that Siras could not be penalised for being homosexual as Section 377 of the Indian Penal Code, which criminalized homosexuality, had been declared unconstitutional by the Delhi High Court in 2009.

I spent two decades here. I love my University. I have always loved it and will continue to do so no matter what. But I wonder if they have stopped loving me because I am gay.

— Siras, 2010

=== Death ===
On 7 April 2010, Siras died in his apartment in Aligarh. Police suspected suicide, and preliminary results from the autopsy showed traces of poison in his body. A case of murder was later registered and six people arrested. On 19 April, the Superintendent of Police stated that three journalists and four AMU officials were named as part of the crime. The case was closed without resolution after the police failed to find sufficient evidence.

Siras was due to retire officially from academia six months later, and the letter officially revoking his suspension arrived at his office the day after his death.

== Works ==
- Several short stories in the Marathi language.
- Award-winning book of Marathi poems, Grass Under My Feet (2002)

== Awards ==
- 2002: literary award by Maharashtra Sahitya Parishad.

== In popular culture ==
Manoj Bajpayee portrayed him in his biopic titled Aligarh. The film received warm reviews from the critics and Bajpayee went on to win several accolades for his performance.

== See also ==
- Suicide of Tyler Clementi, a closeted student at Rutgers University, after being unknowingly filmed having sex with a male student
- Philadelphia, a film about a gay man being terminated from his law firm and his fight for compensation
