= Ashish Vidyarthi =

Indian actor (born 1965)

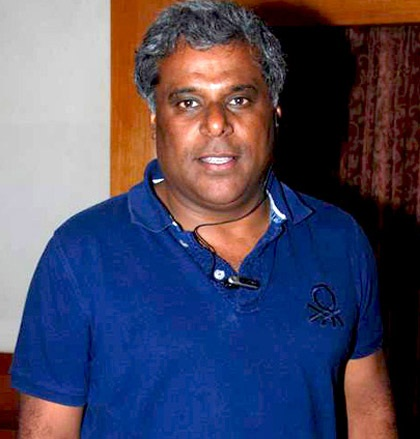
- Ashish Vidyarthi in May 2008
- Born: 19 June 1965 (age 61); Delhi, India
- Occupation: Actor
- Years active: 1986–present
- Spouses: Rajoshi aka Piloo (m. 2001; div. 2022) Rupali Barua (m. 2023)
- Children: 1

YouTube information
- Channel: Ashish Vidyarthi Actor Vlogs
- Years active: 2021–present
- Genres: Travel, Food, Lifestyle, Vlogs
- Subscribers: 2.51 million
- Views: 682 million
- Last updated: 4 July 2026

Ashish Vidyarthi (born 19 June 1965) is an Indian actor who predominantly works in Hindi, Telugu, Tamil, Bengali, Kannada, Malayalam, English, Marathi, and Odia films. He is noted for his antagonist and character roles. In 1995, he received the National Film Award for Best Supporting Actor for Drohkaal. He has also received several awards including a Filmfare Award South along with nominations for two Filmfare Awards.

== Early life ==
Ashish Vidyarthi was born on 19 June 1965 in Delhi, India to a Malayali father from Thalassery (Kerala), and a Bengali mother from Rajasthan with ancestry in West Bengal. His mother Reba Vidyarthi (Née: Chattopadhyay) was a Kathak guru, while his father Govind Vidyarthi is an expert in cataloguing and archiving vanishing Performing Arts of India for the Sangeet Natak Akademi. He attended National School of Drama until 1990 and associated himself with another theatre group, Act One, run by N. K. Sharma.

== Career ==
In 1992, he moved to Bombay (now Mumbai). Ashish played the role of V. P. Menon in his first film, Sardar, based on Sardar Vallabhai Patel's Life. Though, his first release was Drohkaal, for which he won a National Film Award for Best Supporting Actor in 1995. He is also renowned for his role as Ashutosh, in 1942:A Love Story. Ashish received the Star Screen Award for Best Actor in a Negative Role, for the 1996 film Is Raat Ki Subah Nahin. In the same year, for the same role, he was also nominated for Filmfare Best Villain Award.

Vidhyarthi has worked in 11 languages in over 300 films. He is the co-founder and curator of AVID MINER Conversations, which are interactive modules customized for organizations.

Currently, he has a YouTube channel with over one million subscribers and he often vlogs about food.

== Personal life ==
Vidyarthi married Piloo Vidyarthi aka Rajoshi in 2001. They have a son Arth. The couple filed for mutual divorce in 2022. He married Rupali Barua in 2023.

== Filmography ==
During his career, Vidyarthi has acted in over 300 films in 11 different languages.

== Awards ==
Won

- 1995: National Film Award for Best Supporting Actor: Drohkaal
- 1996: Bengal Film Journalists' Association - Best Actor Award (Hindi): Is Raat Ki Subah Nahin
- 1997: Star Screen Award for Best Villain: Is Raat Ki Subah Nahin
- 2005: Filmfare Award for Best Villain – Telugu: Athanokkade
- 2012: Nandi Award for Best Character Actor: Minugurulu

Nominated

- 1996: Filmfare Best Villain Award for Drohkaal
- 1997: Filmfare Best Villain Award: Is Raat Ki Subah Nahin
- 1998: Zee Cine Awards Best Performance by an Actor in a Negative Role for Ziddi
- 2012: SIIMA Award for Best Actor in a Negative Role (Telugu): Ala Modalaindi
- 2014: SIIMA Award for Best Actor in a Negative Role (Kannada): Shivajinagara
- 2015: Star Screen Awards for Best Ensemble Cast: Haider
- 2016: Indian Television Academy Awards for Best Actor in a Negative Role : 24
