= Budhia Singh – Born to Run =

2016 Hindi film

- Theatrical release poster
- Directed by: Soumendra Padhi
- Written by: Soumendra Padhi
- Screenplay by: Soumendra Padhi
- Produced by: Viacom 18 Motion Pictures; Code Red Films
- Starring: Manoj Bajpayee; Mayur Patole
- Cinematography: Manoj Kumar Khatoi
- Edited by: Shivkumar V. Panicker
- Music by: Songs: Hitesh Sonik; Sidhant Mathur; Background Score: Ishaan Chhabra
- Production company: Code Red Films
- Distributed by: Viacom18 Motion Pictures
- Release date: 5 August 2016
- Country: India
- Language: Hindi

Budhia Singh – Born to Run is a 2016 Indian Hindi-language biographical sports film directed by Soumendra Padhi. It is based on the life of Budhia Singh, the world's youngest marathon runner, who ran 48 marathons, when he was only five years old. The film stars Manoj Bajpayee as a coach and Mayur Patole as the title character. It won the Best Children's Film award at the 63rd National Film Awards in 2016.

== Cast ==
- Manoj Bajpayee as Biranchi Das
- Mayur Patole as Budhia Singh
- Tillotama Shome as Sukanti
- Shruti Marathe as Gita
- Chhaya Kadam as Minister of Child Welfare
- Gopal K Singh as litu
- Prasad Pandit as JD Pattanaik
- Gajraj Rao as chairman, Child Welfare
- Rajan Bhise as Dr Mohanty
- Shivraj D Walvekar as B S Gill
- Pushkaraj Chirputkar as journalist

== Production ==
Director Soumendra Padhi had auditioned more than 1200 kids for the title role from different states including Odisha, Chhattisgarh, Pune, Delhi and Mumbai, before he finalized Mayur for the role.

== Music ==
The music for the film is composed by Sidhant Mathur, Ishaan Chhabra and Hitesh Sonik while the lyrics have been penned by Abhishek Dubey, Gopal Datt, Prashant Ingole and Vikrant Yadav.

| No. | Title | Lyrics | Music | Singer(s) | Length |
|---|---|---|---|---|---|
| 1. | "Born to Run Anthem" | Prashant Ingole | Hitesh Sonik | Arhaan Hussain, Siddharth Mahadevan | 2:31 |
| 2. | "Sunapua..Tu Daud Daud" | Gopal Datt | Sidhant Mathur | Rituraj Mohanty | 2:12 |
| Total length: | | | | | 4:43 |
