= Aligarh (film) =

2015 film by Hansal Mehta

- Theatrical release poster
- Directed by: Hansal Mehta
- Written by: Apurva Asrani
- Screenplay by: Apurva Asrani
- Story by: Apurva Asrani; Ishani Banerjee
- Produced by: Sunil Lulla; Shailesh R Singh; Sandip Ssingh
- Starring: Manoj Bajpayee; Rajkummar Rao; Ashish Vidyarthi
- Cinematography: Satya Rai Nagpaul
- Edited by: Apurva Asrani
- Music by: Karan Kulkarni
- Production companies: Eros International; Karma Pictures
- Release dates: 4 October 2015 (Busan); 26 February 2016 (India)
- Running time: 114 minutes
- Country: India
- Language: Hindi

Aligarh is a 2015 Indian Hindi-language biographical drama film directed by Hansal Mehta and written by Apurva Asrani. It stars Manoj Bajpayee and Rajkummar Rao in the lead roles.

The film had its world premiere at the 20th Busan International Film Festival, receiving a standing ovation. The film was released worldwide on 26 February 2016 to critical acclaim, however it performed poorly at the box-office. Bajpayee won critical acclaim and a Filmfare Critics Award for Best Actor for his portrayal of Ramchandra Siras.

== Plot ==
Section 377 of the Indian Penal Code criminalised sexual activities "against the order of nature," which included homosexual acts. On July 2, 2009, the Delhi High Court declared Section 377 unconstitutional, effectively decriminalising homosexuality.

On February 8, 2010, in Aligarh, Uttar Pradesh, Dr. Shrinivas Ramchandra Siras, an esteemed Marathi language professor at Aligarh Muslim University, returned home at night in a rickshaw. Later, Siras and the rickshaw puller went to his apartment, where two TV journalists forcibly entered and filmed Siras engaging in a consensual act with the man. One journalist was armed with a stick, while the other carried a camera. This premeditated sting operation led to Siras's suspension, and the story made local headlines.

The case drew the attention of Deepak Sebastian, a Delhi-based journalist eager for a breakthrough story. With the support of his boss Nameeta, Deepak traveled to Aligarh to investigate. Meanwhile, protests erupted at the university over Siras's suspension. His colleague, Professor Sridharan, pressured him into writing a letter expressing embarrassment over the incident in hopes of retaining his position. Despite this, Siras faced widespread ostracism, denial of medical treatment, and eventual termination. The university also issued him a legal notice to vacate his residence within seven days, cutting off his electricity despite protests.

Deepak, disturbed by the blatant injustice, uncovered evidence suggesting Siras was the victim of a planned operation. Though initially reluctant, Siras eventually confided in Deepak, alleging that jealousy among colleagues motivated the smear campaign. He recounted how two individuals stormed his apartment armed with a camera and sticks, filmed him, and physically assaulted him, followed by four colleagues entering without permission.

Back in Delhi, gay rights activists Anjali Gopalan and Arvind Narayan offered legal support, confident after the Delhi High Court's Section 377 ruling. Siras was represented by Advocate Anand Grover, a key figure in the earlier decriminalisation case. Forced to leave his university-provided housing, Siras moved to private accommodation.

Legal proceedings began in March 2010. The university presented the coerced letter of embarrassment as evidence, while Siras's colleagues refused further assistance. Deepak pursued leads, suspecting that Irfan, the rickshaw puller present that night, was part of the conspiracy. However, Siras expressed trust and affection for Irfan.

In court, the prosecution focused on framing Siras's consensual relationship as immoral and criminal. Despite this, Siras eventually won the case, and the court ordered his reinstatement. Deepak congratulated Siras, promising to celebrate together. Tragically, the next day, Siras was found dead in his apartment. Police discovered traces of poison in his blood but ruled out foul play.

A few years later, the Supreme Court reinstated Section 377, re-criminalising homosexuality in India. (Note: Homosexuality was decriminalised again in 2018)

== Cast ==
- Manoj Bajpayee as Professor Dr. Shrinivas Ramchandra Siras
- Rajkummar Rao as Journalist Deepak "Deepu" Sebastian
- Ashish Vidyarthi as Advocate Anand Grover
- Ishwak Singh as Arvind Narayan
- Nutan Surya as Anjali Gopalan
- Divya Unny as Reporter
- Suman Vaidya as Shadab Qureshi
- Devyansh Agnihotri (Child Artist)
- Saptrishi Ghosh as Assistant Lawyer
- Dilnaz Irani as Nameeta
- Sukhesh Arora as Tahir Islam
- Sumit Gulati as Tashi
- Sachin Parikh as Anuj
- Balaji Gauri as Nita Grewal
- K.R.Parmeshwar as Prof. Sridharan
- Prashant Kumar as Rickshaw wala

== Production ==
Mehta said the planning for the film started in 2010, when a woman from Delhi sent him an email with an idea for a story based on the AMU incident, and his editor Asrani decided to choose it as his first film writing project. Though Rao and Bajpayee's characters interact face to face throughout the film, the real life Sebestian never met Siras, interacting with him only through phone conversations.

Govinda was Hansal Mehta's first choice for the role of Ramchandra Siras, before Manoj Bajpayee was cast. The film was shot in various locations, including Allahabad, Bareilly, Delhi and Mumbai. Mehta could not shoot Aligarh on location at AMU due to resistance from local far-right groups, and hence much of the film was shot at Bareilly College, which while smaller, has the same sense of architecture as AMU.

Bajpayee said in 2024 that making the film had a major impact on him, stating that it guided him to where he should take his career next, and that it improved him as a human being. He also said that he was not himself when doing the film, and that he felt Siras' spirit guiding him.

== Reception ==
Aligarh had its European première at the 59th BFI London Film Festival on 10 October 2015. The response was generally superlative and the film garnered excellent reviews. Screen International in its review called it a "A subtle, sensitive take on a controversial real-life court case involving the victimization of a gay college professor, Aligarh underscores the growing strength and diversity of Indian independent cinema".

The British Film Institute, in its 'Whats On' review of Aligarh called it "Probably the best film yet on the Indian gay male experience, Hansal Mehta directs a riveting and nuanced tale that is as touching as it is powerful." Aligarh had its India première in Mumbai at the 17th Jio MAMI Mumbai Film Festival on 30 October 2015. It also has the honour of being the only Indian film to open the festival since its inception. The response was once again overwhelming. Meenakshi Shedde, South Asia Consultant to the Berlin Film Festival and award-winning critic, had this to say about in her Mid-Day review: "Aligarh is masterfully directed: it is that rare film that courageously stands for human rights, including those of homosexuals, yet offers a quiet, distilled perspective."

Gay rights activist and editor of Bombay Dost magazine, Ashok Row Kavi, in his Firstpost review called Aligarh "a masterpiece of cinematic skills" and went on to say "What Mehta and writer Apurva Asrani have done is pluck out a commonplace professor in a commonplace university and weave a true life story into a tapestry of terrifying, compelling drama."

Columnist Aseem Chhabra in his Rediff review said "Aligarh is a very important film, a milestone in the history of Indian cinema that should start the much-needed conversation about how India treats a visible and yet often ignored minority group." Shubra Gupta of Indian Express gave it 3.5 stars, calling it "both timely and telling", stating that the writers came with a film with "authenticity and emotional heft" of a story all can relate to. She praises Bajpayee for his portrayal having a "bewildered fragility" with gentleness demanding "understanding and compassion."

Saibal Chatterjee of NDTV gave it 4.5 stars, finding the movie portrays "a portrait of loneliness" very rare in Indian cinema. He praises the performance of Bajpayee and Rao, stating that Bajpayee digs deep and makes himself seem inseparable from the agony and tragedy of Siras, with Rao proving to be ideal foil. He also praises Mehta focusing on his usual theme of "outsiders refusing to blend in", calling the movie "a human drama with universal resonance". Namrata Joshi of The Hindu praises the film, stating that it opts to "remain in a humane and heartfelt zone rather than being hard-hitting" and a "quietude, gentleness and sincerity of treatment." She also praises Bajpayee for his idiosyncratic portrayal of Siras- showing Siras and his beliefs about love and emotions in a very lingering manner.

== Accolades ==
Year	Award	Category	Recipient(s)	Result	Ref.
2016	10th Asia Pacific Screen Awards	Best Actor	Manoj Bajpayee	Won	
2016	Jagran Film Festival	Best Actor	Manoj Bajpayee	Won	
2017	18th IIFA Awards	Best Supporting Actor	Rajkumar Rao	Nominated	
2017	62nd Filmfare Awards	Best Actor (Critics)	Manoj Bajpayee	Won	
2017	62nd Filmfare Awards	Best Supporting Actor	Rajkumar Rao	Nominated	
2017	17th Zee Cine Awards	Best Actor (Critics)	Manoj Bajpayee	Nominated	
2017	17th Zee Cine Awards	Best Actor in a Supporting Role – Male	Rajkumar Rao	Nominated	

== See also ==
- Philadelphia, a film about a gay man being terminated from his law firm and his fight for compensation
- Brokeback Mountain, a tragic love story between two cowboys forced to hide their relationship due to societal pressures, set against the backdrop of the Wyoming wilderness.
- List of LGBTQ-related films
