= Sirf Ek Bandaa Kaafi Hai =

2023 Indian film by Apoorv Singh Karki

- Official release poster
- Directed by: Apoorv Singh Karki
- Written by: P. C. Solanki; Apoorva Singh Karki; Deepak Kingrani
- Produced by: Vinod Bhanushali; Kamlesh Bhanushali; Vishal Gurnani; Asif Shaikh; Suparn Verma
- Starring: Manoj Bajpayee; Adrija Sinha; Surya Mohan Kulshrestha
- Cinematography: Arjun Kukreti
- Edited by: Sumeet Kotian
- Music by: Sangeet-Siddharth; Roy
- Production companies: Bhanushali Studios Limited; Zee Studios
- Distributed by: ZEE5
- Release date: 23 May 2023
- Running time: 132 minutes
- Country: India
- Language: Hindi

Sirf Ek Bandaa Kaafi Hai (transl. Just One Common Man is Enough), or simply Bandaa (transl. Common Man), is a 2023 Indian Hindi-language legal drama film directed by Apoorv Singh Karki and co-produced by Zee Studios and Bhanushali Studios. The film stars Manoj Bajpayee, Adrija Sinha, and Surya Mohan Kulshrestha. It is inspired by a five-year long fight by a sessions court lawyer Adv. P. C. Solanki. The plot is based on the trial of Asaram for the rape of a 16-year-old girl from Shahjahanpur, Uttar Pradesh, on 15 August 2013.

The film was released on 23 May 2023 through the streaming platform ZEE5, and had a limited theatrical release on 2 June 2023. It received positive reviews from critics. The film featured in the 54th International Film Festival of India's Panorama Mainstream Section.

At the 2023 Filmfare OTT Awards, Sirf Ek Bandaa Kaafi Hai received 7 nominations and won 5 awards, including Best Web Original Film, Best Director in a Web Original Film (Karki) and Best Actor in a Web Original Film (Bajpayee). At the 71st National Film Awards, the film won Best Dialogue.

== Cast ==
- Manoj Bajpayee as Adv. P. C. Solanki
- Adrija Sinha as Nu Singh
- Surya Mohan Kulshrestha as Asumal "Asaram" Sirumalani Harpalani
- Nikhil Pandey as Amit Nihag
- Priyanka Setia as ACP Chanchal Mishra
- Jaihind Kumar as Nu's father
- Durga Sharma as Nu's mother
- Vipin Sharma as Adv. Pramod Sharma
- Abhijit Lahiri as Adv. Ram Chandvani (character based on Ram Jethmalani)
- Saurabh Sharma as Nu's first lawyer
- Archana Dani as Mrs. Bapat
- Ikhlaque Ahmed Khan as Session Court Judge
- Kaustav Sinha as Bittu
- Manish Mishra as Inspector Amit Sial
- Vivek Sinha as Baba's son
- Shivraj Walvekar as Police Commissioner of Jodhpur
- Balaji Lakshminarasimhan as Advocate Venkateshwara Swami (character based on Subramanian Swamy)
- Vivek Tandon as Senior Supreme Court Lawyer (character based on Salman Khurshid)
- Gauransh Sharma as Solanki's son
- Veena Mehta as Solanki's mother
- Manohar Teli as Mahendra Singh
- Vikram Singh as Kripal Singh
- Amrita Chakraborty as Pushpalata
- Himanshu Manek as Madhukar Tripathi, Saraswati's school principal
- Micky Singh as Mrs. Kamat
- Rajesh Talnikar as Dinesh Bhavchandani
- Tushar Phulke as Defence Witness
- Vishwamitra Dixit as Defence lawyer's assistant

== Production ==
Principal photography began in October 2022. The film was primarily shot in Mumbai and concluded in December 2022.

== Music ==
The film's music was composed by Sangeet-Siddharth and Roy.

No.	Title	Lyrics	Singer(s)	Length
1.	"Bandaa Title Track"	Sameer, Enkore	Vivek Hariharan, Roy, Enkore	2:10
2.	"Sahara Tu Mera"	Garima Obrah	Asees Kaur, Sangeet-Siddharth	4:01
3.	"Bandeya"	Garima Obrah, Sangeet Haldipur	Sonu Nigam	4:46
Total length:				10:27

== Controversies ==
Advocate P. C. Solanki filed a case against the producers of the film, alleging that the events that were depicted in the film were a violation of his intellectual property rights. The Sant Shri Asaramji Ashram Charitable Trust sent a legal notice to the producers of the film following the trailer launch, claiming it tarnished his reputation and hurt the sentiments of his devotees and followers.

== Reception ==
=== Critical response ===
Mint Lounge wrote " Sirf Ek Bandaa Kaafi Hai review: Unlovely and uncomplicated. The screen slopes from left to right. The décor is very Wicked Witch of the West: black and brown and green. Nothing is clear, the eye goes nowhere, it’s a mess. Sirf Ek Bandaa Kaafi Hai received critical acclaim from critics. The Hindu wrote "Despite a pumped-up narrative style, the film looks realistic, shot in life-size courtrooms and streets. And there are some memorable juxtapositions, all of them featuring Solanki." Bollywood Hungama wrote "Apoorv Singh Karki's direction is first-rate. He makes good use of the powerful script and dialogues and adds the required drama to the narrative. The way he has helmed simple scenes and enhanced the impact is praiseworthy, like Baba’s arrest, Baba greeting his followers and distributing sweets outside the court, Solanki narrating the road accident story etc." Grace Cyril for India Today rated the movie 3 stars out of 5 and wrote "With a narrative so sensitive, the screenplay has been handled with the utmost care. There's a scene where a lawyer asks Nu if the godman made her touch his private parts. Even though he is defending the godman, he gets ashamed asking this and the entire court falls silent."

Deepa Gahlot for Rediff.com rated the film 3.5 stars out of 5 and wrote "Karki deftly balances the emotions of hope and despair and at one level, the film makes the audience feel good, that Nu and Solanki's battle was not in vain." Pinkvilla wrote "The courtroom drama deals with the subject matter in a very delicate and sensitive way. Not just audiences having an inclination towards courtroom films but everyone should enjoy watching the film." A critic from Firstpost wrote "One of the best scenes of Sirf Ek Bandaa Kaafi Hai is when Solanki (Manoj Bajpayee) tries to convince the minor girl on the terrace to fight against the god-man and not be scared. He says that now it’s time not to hide your face behind the dupatta, but to tie it hard around your waist and fight like Ma Kali." The Times of India rated the movie 4 stars out of 5 and wrote "The movie, where only Advocate Solanki's name remains unchanged, while other characters are given screen names, handles the narrative with great sensitivity, even in the scenes when the defence asks Nu pointed questions about the incident or how mindfully the police handle the case. It does not sensationalise the event while ensuring it’s gripping."

Scroll.in praised Manoj Bajpayee's performance and wrote "The title gives a fair warning. The movie isn’t about the teenager and her family who had the courage to file a police complaint but the crusading lawyer." A critic from The Quint wrote "In focusing on the ek bandaa (one man) at the centre of the courtroom drama, we see little of the stories bubbling around him. The way the pressure of "proving" allegations of sexual misconduct falls on the survivor is hinted at but not explored." A critic from CNBC TV18 wrote "The entire escapade, peopled with shady characters and accentuated by the ashram’s secluded and eerie premises, was as spooky as a true-crime documentary." Zoom TV wrote "The film skillfully navigates the complexities of faith and the law, questioning the influence of charisma."

A critic from Lehren wrote "Most of all, there’s an unabashed borrowing of the Criminal Justice and Jolly LLB templates – a self-effacing advocate pitched against biggies in the legal business, a bit of wit attempted as the serious case proceeds and glimpses into the humble lawyer’s personal life. Shubham Kulkarni of Koimoi rated the film 4/5 stars and said "It is a masterclass about how an actor can hold an entire movie on his skilled shoulders. Manoj Bajpayee doesn’t blow life in this movie; he is the life of the film".

== Accolades ==
Award	Ceremony date	Category	Nominee / work	Result	Ref.
Filmfare OTT Awards	26 November 2023	Best Web Original Film	Sirf Ek Bandaa Kaafi Hai	Won	
Filmfare OTT Awards	26 November 2023	Best Director in a Web Original Film	Apoorv Singh Karki	Won	
Filmfare OTT Awards	26 November 2023	Best Actor in a Web Original Film	Manoj Bajpayee	Won	
Filmfare OTT Awards	26 November 2023	Best Story (Web Original Film)	Deepak Kingrani	Won	
Filmfare OTT Awards	26 November 2023	Best Original Dialogue (Web Original Film)	Deepak Kingrani	Won	
Filmfare OTT Awards	26 November 2023	Best Background Music (Web Original Film)	Sandeep Chowta	Nominated	
Filmfare OTT Awards	26 November 2023	Best Editing (Web Original Film)	Sumeet Kotian	Nominated	
National Film Awards	1 August 2025	Best Dialogue	Deepak Kingarani	Won	
