= Kaun? =

1999 film by Ram Gopal Varma

- Poster
- Directed by: Ram Gopal Verma
- Written by: Anurag Kashyap
- Produced by: Mukesh Udeshi; Allu Aravind
- Starring: Urmila Matondkar; Manoj Bajpayee; Sushant Singh
- Cinematography: Mazhar Kamran
- Edited by: Bhanodaya
- Music by: Sandeep Chowta
- Production company: Kshitij Production Combines
- Release date: 26 February 1999
- Running time: 94 minutes
- Country: India
- Language: Hindi

Kaun? (transl. 'Who?') is a 1999 Indian Hindi-language psychological thriller film directed by Ram Gopal Varma, written by Anurag Kashyap and starring Urmila Matondkar, Manoj Bajpayee and Sushant Singh. It was shot in 15 days, making it one of the lowest recorded time to complete and wrap up shoot in Indian cinema history.

The film was remade into Kannada as Shock (2010). According to the Hindustan Times, Kaun? enjoys a near cult status today.

== Plot ==
On a rainy day, a scared young woman speaks to her parents on the telephone, asking when they will return home. As she watches news reports of a serial killer at large in the city, the doorbell rings. The visitor identifies himself as Sameer Purnavale, claiming to be a business associate of the homeowner, Mr. Malhotra. Due to the news report, the woman hesitates to let him in and asserts that the house belongs to Mr. Gupta, not Mr. Malhotra.

Believing that there has been a misunderstanding, Sameer persistently rings the doorbell. To scare him away, she lies that her husband is sleeping upstairs. Sameer claims that he has already seen a man inside and asks to speak with him. Terrified by his claim and a sudden noise inside the house, the woman flees outside. Sameer brings her back indoors, reassuring her that he will protect her.

Following a sudden power outage, the woman goes to the kitchen to fetch candles and discovers her pet cat dead. Panicked, she runs towards the front door, only to be confronted by a man holding a gun. The stranger identifies himself as Inspector Qureshi and pretends to call the police station. Suspicious by his behaviour, Sameer and the woman confront him, resulting in a physical altercation. The woman grabs the gun, forcing Qureshi to confess that he is actually a petty thief, not a police officer. She then uses the telephone to ask her mother to contact the police. Suspecting that Qureshi is the serial killer, Sameer gravely injures him. He then attempts to call the police himself, only to discover that the telephone line is dead. Confused, he instructs the woman to hide while he tries to fix the wiring. The doorbell rings again, and when Sameer answers it, another stranger asks for Mr. Malhotra, contradicting the woman's earlier claim about Mr. Gupta.

Suspicious, Sameer searches for her in the attic and stumbles upon the decaying body of the real Mr. Malhotra. The woman ambushes Sameer, but he is unexpectedly stabbed by Qureshi, who mistakenly believes Sameer is the killer. The woman softly hums a tune and stabs Qureshi to death. The following morning, the woman calmly cleans the bloodstains, removes the bodies, rearranges the furniture, and holds a pretend conversation with her mother using the disconnected telephone, revealing that she herself is the serial killer. The doorbell rings once more, with another visitor asking for Mr. Malhotra. The woman turns toward the camera and flashes an unhinged smile.

== Cast ==
- Urmila Matondkar as a nameless woman referred to as Ma'am.
- Manoj Bajpayee as Sameer Poonavale
- Sushant Singh as Qureshi

== Reception ==
Anupama Chopra in her review for India Today stated, "Relentlessly experimental, he moved from the MTV love story Rangeela to the spoof-gone-poof Daud to the gritty underworld saga Satya without a pause. In Kaun, Varma takes a shot at an Ittefaq-style songless suspense thriller and almost pulls it off." Suparn Verma of Rediff said, "The film starts with a big scare that leaves you feeling silly and, slowly, as the momentum picks up, it draws you in. You prepare for the worst and end up jumping into the shadows. Though the climax is a little long-drawn and leaves you with some unanswered questions, it delivers the required punch."
