= Gali Guleiyan =

- Theatrical release poster
- Directed by: Dipesh Jain
- Produced by: Dipesh Jain; Shuchi Jain
- Starring: Manoj Bajpayee Ranvir Shorey Neeraj Kabi Shahana Goswami
- Cinematography: Kai Miedendorp
- Edited by: Chris Witt
- Music by: Dana Niu
- Release dates: 14 October 2017 (Busan); 7 September 2018 (India)
- Running time: 117 minutes
- Country: India
- Language: Hindi

Gali Guleiyan (transl. Street gulls and internationally In the Shadows; Hindi pronunciation: [gəliː gʊlɪjaːn]) is a 2017 Indian Hindi-language psychological drama film produced and directed by Dipesh Jain. The film stars Manoj Bajpayee, Ranvir Shorey, Neeraj Kabi, Shahana Goswami and debutant Om Singh. Its poster was released on 3 October 2017.

Gali Guleiyan premiered at the 22nd Busan International Film Festival and was also screened at the 2017 MAMI Film Festival, Indian Film Festival of Los Angeles, Atlanta Film Festival. 42nd Cleveland International Film Festival, Chicago International Film Festival and the 2018 Indian Film Festival of Melbourne. The film was released theatrically in Indian theatres on 7 September 2018. Its lifetime box office collection is estimated at Rs.50 lakhs (About $69,000).

== Plot ==
In the labyrinthine lanes of Old Delhi resides Khuddoos (Manoj Bajpayee), a reclusive middle-aged man who spies on his neighbours through hidden cameras. His only companion is Ganeshi (Ranvir Shorey), a friend who checks in on him and manages his daily needs. Khuddoos, a mechanic by profession, immerses himself in the routine of his solitary existence until one day when he is visited by his estranged brother, Shaukat. Shaukat requests an old necklace of their mother for his daughter's wedding.

That night, while finding the necklace, Khuddoos overhears someone in a nearby house engaged in domestic violence. Shocked, Khuddoos tries to use his cameras to find the house but fails. The house belongs to Liakat (Neeraj Kabi) and his wife Saira (Shahana Goswami). Liakat works as a butcher and regularly beats his son, Idris (Om Singh). Idris is a curious boy who runs around exploring the neighbourhood and peeping into other's homes and loves his mother more that anything else.

Khuddoos explains the situation to Ganeshi, who advises him to stop meddling in others' business and to focus on his job. Shaukat returns and expresses disgust with Khuddoos' solitary and unhygienic lifestyle. Gradually, Khuddoos becomes fixated on finding Idris but is unable to do so consistently. This affects his sleep and health, eventually causing him to default on his shop's rent, leading to its closure. Meanwhile, Liakat becomes more lenient with Idris, refraining from punishing him and showing a sudden change in attitude, even though Idris remains uncomfortable due to his father's true nature.

One day, Idris catches his father involved in an affair with another woman, he plans to run away with his mother and baby brother. Idris accuses his father of the baby's death and is severely beaten by him. Subsequently, Idris goes to the railway station, attempting to run away, but is found by Liakat and beaten again.Meanwhile, Khuddoos, still unable to find Idris, scours the streets in an attempt to identify his house, but his efforts are futile. He eventually ends up drunk and arrested after neighbors complain, feeling unsafe around him. However, he is bailed out by Ganeshi, who advises him to stop fixating on finding Idris' house and to move on with his life.

That night, Idris suffocates Liakat to death. A shocked Khuddoos, hearing the struggle, breaks the wall to reach Idris' house, only to discover water pipes on the other side. As he dusts off an old photo, it reveals Idris, Liakat, Saira, and the baby. The revelation unfolds that Idris was Khuddoos' younger self, and the traumatic incident led to his estrangement from the family. After many days, when Ganeshi and the neighbors enter the house, they find Khuddoos missing, and Ganeshi learns the truth upon seeing the photo.

== Cast ==
- Manoj Bajpayee as Khuddoos
- Shahana Goswami as Saira
- Ranvir Shorey as Ganeshi
- Neeraj Kabi as Liakat
- Ashwath Bhatt as Shaukat
- Om Singh as Idris

== Critical reception ==
Deborah Young of The Hollywood Reporter felt the story was "poignantly told with some nice twists", but called its mystery a "fail".
