= Aks (2001 film) =

2001 film by Rakeysh Omprakash Mehra

- Theatrical release poster
- Directed by: Rakeysh Omprakash Mehra
- Written by: Rensil D'Silva; Rakeysh Omprakash Mehra; Kamlesh Pandey
- Produced by: Amitabh Bachchan; Jhamu Sughand
- Starring: Amitabh Bachchan; Raveena Tandon; Manoj Bajpayee; Nandita Das
- Narrated by: Manoj Bajpayee
- Cinematography: Kiran Deohans
- Edited by: P. S. Bharathi
- Music by: Songs: Anu Malik; Score: Ranjit Barot
- Production companies: Amitabh Bachchan Corporation; Flicks Motion Pictures
- Distributed by: Amitabh Bachchan Corporation
- Release date: 13 July 2001
- Running time: 184 minutes
- Country: India
- Language: Hindi
- Box office: ₹13.4 crore

Aks (transl. Reflection) is a 2001 Indian Hindi-language supernatural action thriller film directed by Rakeysh Omprakash Mehra in his directorial debut. The film stars Amitabh Bachchan, Raveena Tandon, Manoj Bajpayee, and Nandita Das. The film's music was composed by Anu Malik.

Aks was released on 13 July 2001. Despite receiving mixed reviews from critics and being declared as a commercial failure, it won three awards at the 47th Filmfare Awards: Best Actor — Critics (Bachchan), Special Award Performance (Tandon), and Best Sound Design (Ranjan). Bachchan and Bajpayee were nominated for the Best Actor and Best Villain awards at the same ceremony as well.

== Synopsis ==
Aks is a supernatural thriller centering on two characters― a cop named Manu Verma and a shadowy killer named Raghavan. During a conference in Budapest, the defence minister is found murdered. Manu Verma investigates the case and discovers that the culprit is Raghavan Ghatge, a sociopathic serial killer who works as a hitman.

Raghavan is caught. As he is about to be executed by hanging, his spirit goes into Manu's body and starts to manipulate the cop into performing acts that Raghavan wanted to perform. But he couldn't save himself. He goes to another town but is not able to find peace.

Eventually, Raghavan's spirit leaves Manu's body. Everything seems to be normal. Manu and his family go on vacation. Unfortunately, Raghavan's spirit is still alive and possesses Raghavan's brother.

== Cast ==
- Amitabh Bachchan as Inspector Manu Verma
- Raveena Tandon as Neeta
- Manoj Bajpayee as Raghavan Ghatge
- Nandita Das as Supriya Verma
- K.K. Raina as Mahadevan Ghatge
- Kamal Chopra as ACP Pradhan
- Tanvi Azmi as Madhu Pradhan
- Vineet Kumar as Narang
- Pramod Moutho as Justice Balwant Chaudhry
- Salim Ghouse as Blind Guru
- Veerendra Saxena as Hanif Kasai
- Vijay Raaz as Yeda Yakub
- Vrajesh Hirjee as RAW Officer 1 Ramesh
- Gajraj Rao as RAW Officer 2 Chakradhari
- Mithilesh Chaturvedi as PM's Aide Pathak
- Amol Palekar as Defence Minister Alok Patel
- Mohan Agashe as Prime Minister
- Abhimanyu Singh as ACP Arjun Shrivastav

== Production ==
Amitabh Bachchan sported a French beard to portray his character.

== Music ==
The soundtrack was composed by Anu Malik, with lyrics penned by Gulzar. The background score was composed by Ranjit Barot.

Aks

Soundtrack album by Anu Malik
- Released: 2001
- Genre: Feature film soundtrack
- Length: 45:55
- Language: Hindi
- Label: Saregama

Tracklist
No.	Title	Singer(s)	Length
1.	"Yeh Raat"	Anupama	6:06
2.	"Raat Aati Hain"	Shubha Mudgal	6:20
3.	"Aaja Gufaon Mein Aa"	KK & Vasundhara Das	5:23
4.	"Hum Bhool Gaye" (Male Vocals)	Hariharan	5:23
5.	"Hum Bhool Gaye" (Female Vocals)	K. S. Chithra	5:09
6.	"Banda Yeh Bindass Hai"	KK	3:36
7.	"Bhala Bura" (Composed by Indrajeet Sharma)	Amitabh Bachchan	3:47
8.	"Ramleela" (Arranged by Rajat Dholakia)	Amitabh Bachchan, Nandita Das & Kavita Mundra	5:20
9.	"Rabba Rabba"	Vasundhara Das & Sukhwinder Singh	4:51
Total length:			45:55

=== Reception ===
Sukanya Verma of Rediff appreciated the album saying that Aks is a "captivating album with funky, experimental, new age music".

== Reception ==
The Hindu praised the cinematography and music of the film along with the acting performances of all actors, particularly Amitabh Bachchan's. Taran Adarsh of Bollywood Hungama gave the film two out of five stars, praising the visuals and music of the film but criticized the film for being too complicated and slow.

== Awards and nominations ==
Ceremony	Category	Recipient	Result
47th Filmfare Awards	Best Actor	Amitabh Bachchan	Nominated
47th Filmfare Awards	Best Actor (Critics)	Amitabh Bachchan	Won
47th Filmfare Awards	Special Award	Raveena Tandon	Won
47th Filmfare Awards	Best Sound Design	Ranjit Ranjan	Won
47th Filmfare Awards	Best Background Score	Ranjit Barot	Won
47th Filmfare Awards	Best Actor in a Negative Role	Manoj Bajpayee	Nominated
