= National Film Award for Best Actor in a Supporting Role =

Indian film award

- National award for contributions to Indian cinema
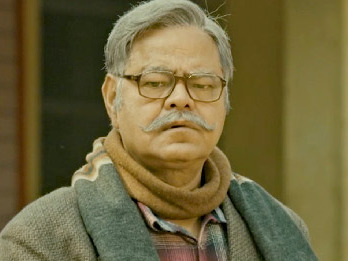
- The 2024 recipients: Sanjay Mishra (actor)
- Awarded for: Best performance by an actor in a supporting role
- Sponsored by: National Film Development Corporation of India
- Formerly called: National Film Award for Best Supporting Actor (1984–2021)
- Rewards: Rajat Kamal (Silver Lotus); ₹2,00,000
- First award: 1984
- Most recent winner: Sanjay Mishra, Bhakshak (2024)

Highlights
- Most wins: Atul Kulkarni, Nana Patekar and Pankaj Kapur (2)

The National Film Award for Best Actor in a Supporting Role is an honour presented annually at India's National Film Awards ceremony by the National Film Development Corporation of India (NFDC), an organisation set up by the Ministry of Information and Broadcasting. A national panel appointed annually by the NFDC selects the actor who has given the best performance in a supporting role within Indian cinema. The award is presented by the President of India at a ceremony held in New Delhi. Since the 70th National Film Awards, the name was changed to "Best Actor in a Supporting Role".

The winner is given a "Rajat Kamal" (Silver Lotus) certificate and a cash prize of ₹2 lakh (US$2,100). (Note: The cash prize was ₹50,000, from 54th National Film Awards (2006) until 69th National Film Awards (2021). Before the 54th National Film Awards (2006), the cash prize was ₹10,000.) Including ties and repeat winners, the government of India has presented a total of 43 Best Supporting Actor awards to 29 different actors. Although Indian cinema produces films in more than 20 languages, the actors whose performances have won awards have worked in one or more of seven major languages: Hindi (19 awards), Tamil (10 awards), Bengali (3 awards), Malayalam (5 awards), Marathi (3 awards), Telugu (1 award), Kannada (1 award).

The first recipient was Victor Banerjee, who was honoured at the 32nd National Film Awards for his performance in the Bengali film Ghare Baire (1984). As of the 2013 awards, three actors—Nana Patekar, Pankaj Kapur, and Atul Kulkarni—have been honoured twice. Patekar was awarded for the Hindi films Parinda (1989) (Note: Year in which the film was censored by the Central Board of Film Certification.) and Agni Sakshi (1996). Kapur received the awards for his work in the Hindi films Raakh (1988) and Maqbool (2003). Kulkarni was awarded for his performances in the Tamil / Hindi film Hey Ram (1999) and the Hindi film Chandni Bar (2001). Paresh Rawal and Dilip Prabhavalkar have each won the award for two performances in a single year. Rawal received the award for his starring roles in the Hindi films Woh Chokri (1993) and Sir (1993) at the 41st National Film Awards, while Prabhavalkar won at the 54th National Film Awards for his performances in the Hindi film Lage Raho Munna Bhai (2006) and the Marathi film Shevri (2006). At the 42nd National Film Awards, the award was tied between Ashish Vidyarthi and Nagesh, winning for their roles in the Hindi film Drohkaal (1994) and the Tamil film Nammavar (1994), respectively. It is repeated at the 71st National Film Awards also, as the award tied between Vijayaraghavan and M. S. Bhaskar, winning for their roles in the Malayalam film Pookkaalam (2023) and the Tamil film Parking (2023) respectively. They also become most recent recipients of this award. Nana Patekar, Mithun Chakraborty, Naseeruddin Shah, Prakash Raj and Manoj Bajpayee are the actors to receive honours in both acting categories: Best Actor in a Leading Role and Best Actor in a Supporting Role.

== List of recipients ==
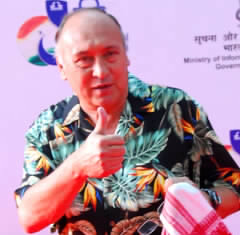
Victor Banerjee is the first-ever recipient of the Best Supporting Actor Award for his performance in Bengali film Ghare Baire in 1984.

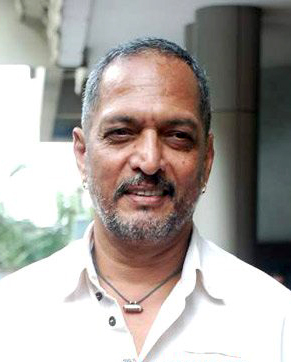
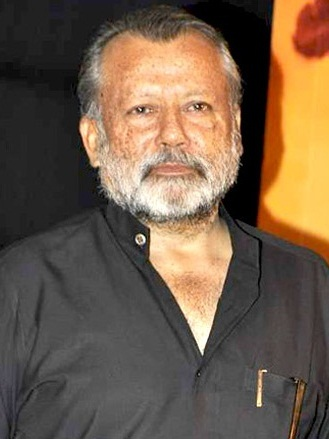
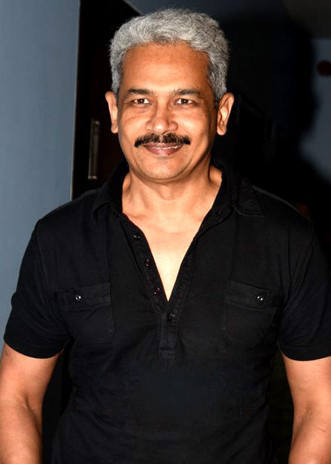
Nana Patekar (top), Pankaj Kapur (middle), and Atul Kulkarni (bottom) are the three actors to win the honour twice.
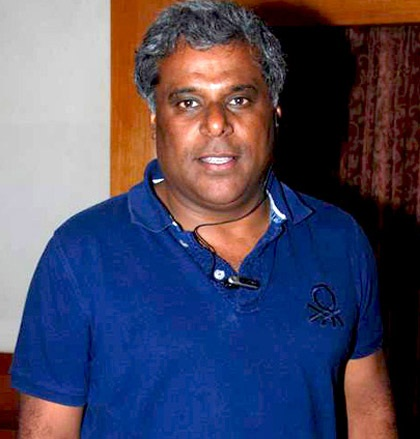
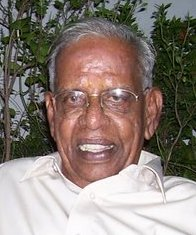
Ashish Vidyarthi (top) and Nagesh (bottom) tied the award in 1994 for their roles in Drohkaal and Nammavar respectively.
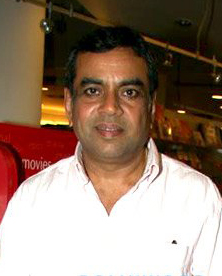
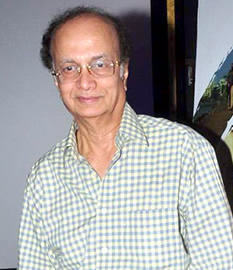
Paresh Rawal (top) and Dilip Prabhavalkar (bottom) are the two actors who won the award for different films in a single year for different award ceremonies. Rawal was awarded in 1993 & Prabhavalkar in 2006.

Key

Symbol	Meaning
†	Indicates a joint award for that year
‡	Indicates that the winner won the award for two performances in that year

List of award recipients, showing the year, role(s), film(s) and language(s)
Year	Recipient(s)	Role(s)	Film(s)	Language(s)	Ref. (Note: The "Ref." cites the winner and the role played by them in the film. While there are some sources that are written in both English and Hindi, certain references are entirely in Hindi language.)
1984 (32nd)	Victor Banerjee	Nikhilesh Choudhury	Ghare Baire	Bengali	
1985 (33rd)	Dipankar De	Husband	Parama	Bengali	
1986 (34th)	Suresh Oberoi	Mukhi	Mirch Masala	Hindi	
1987 (35th)	Thilakan	Neduvancheril Achunni Nair (Mooppil Nair)	Rithubhedam	Malayalam	
1988 (36th)	Pankaj Kapur	Inspector P. K.	Raakh	Hindi	
1989 (37th)	Nana Patekar	Anna Seth	Parinda	Hindi	
1990 (38th)	Nedumudi Venu	Maharaja Udayavarma Thampuran	His Highness Abdullah	Malayalam	
1991 (39th)	P. L. Narayana	Appala Nayudu	Yagnam	Telugu	
1992 (40th)	Sunny Deol	Govind Srivatsav	Damini – Lightning	Hindi	
1993 (41st) ‡	Paresh Rawal	• Lalitram Mohan Roy • Velji	• Woh Chokri • Sir	Hindi	
1994 (42nd) †	Ashish Vidyarthi	Commander Bhadra	Drohkaal	Hindi	
1994 (42nd) †	Nagesh	Prabhakar Rao	Nammavar	Tamil	
1995 (43rd)	Mithun Chakraborty	Ramakrishna	Swami Vivekananda	Hindi	
1996 (44th)	Nana Patekar	Vishwanath	Agni Sakshi	Hindi	
1997 (45th)	Prakash Raj	Tamizhselvan	Iruvar	Tamil	
1998 (46th)	Manoj Bajpai	Bhiku Mhatre	Satya	Hindi	
1999 (47th)	Atul Kulkarni	Shriram Abhyankar/ (Ramakrishna Pandey) (Note: Atul Kulkarni played the role of a man who changes his name in later part of film.)	Hey Ram	Tamil	
2000 (48th)	H. G. Dattatreya	Hasanabba	Munnudi	Kannada	
2001 (49th)	Atul Kulkarni	Pothya Sawant	Chandni Bar	Hindi	
2002 (50th)	Chandrasekhar	Lawrence (Note: Chandrasekhar played the role of a man suffering from tetraplegia.)	Nanba Nanba	Tamil	
2003 (51st)	Pankaj Kapur	Jahangir Khan (Abbaji)	Maqbool	Hindi	
2004 (52nd)	Haradhan Bandopadhyay	Haradhan Bandopadhyay	Krantikaal	Bengali	
2005 (53rd)	Naseeruddin Shah	Mohit	Iqbal	Hindi	
2006 (54th) ‡	Dilip Prabhavalkar	• Mahatma Gandhi (Note: Dilip Prabhavalkar played the image of Mahatma Gandhi.) • Clerk	• Lage Raho Munna Bhai • Shevri	• Hindi • Marathi	
2007 (55th)	Darshan Jariwala	Mahatma Gandhi	Gandhi, My Father	Hindi	
2008 (56th)	Arjun Rampal	Joseph Mascarenhas (Joe)	Rock On!!	Hindi	
2009 (57th)	Farooq Sheikh	S. K. Rao	Lahore	Hindi	
2010 (58th)	Thambi Ramaiah	Ramaiah	Mynaa	Tamil	
2011 (59th)	Appukutty	Azhagarsami	Azhagarsamiyin Kuthirai	Tamil	
2012 (60th)	Annu Kapoor	Dr. Baldev Chaddha	Vicky Donor	Hindi	
2013 (61st)	Saurabh Shukla	Justice Sunderlal Tripathi	Jolly LLB	Hindi	
2014 (62nd)	Bobby Simha	Assault Sethu	Jigarthanda	Tamil	
2015 (63rd)	Samuthirakani	Muthuvel	Visaranai	Tamil	
2016 (64th)	Manoj Joshi	Keshav	Dashakriya	Marathi	
2017 (65th)	Fahadh Faasil	Prasad	Thondimuthalum Driksakshiyum	Malayalam	
2018 (66th)	Swanand Kirkire	Prasanna	Chumbak	Marathi	
2019 (67th)	Vijay Sethupathi	Shilpa (Manickam) (Note: Vijay Sethupathi played a man who undergoes gender transitioning.)	Super Deluxe	Tamil	
2020 (68th)	Biju Menon	SI Ayyappan Nair alias Mundoor Madan	Ayyappanum Koshiyum	Malayalam	
2021 (69th)	Pankaj Tripathi	Bhanu Pratap Pandey	Mimi	Hindi	
2022 (70th)	Pavan Malhotra	Fouja Singh	Fouja	Haryanvi	
2023 (71st)	Vijayaraghavan	Ittoop	Pookkaalam	Malayalam	
2023 (71st)	M. S. Bhaskar	S. Ilamparuthi	Parking	Tamil	
2024 (72nd)	Sanjay Mishra	Baskar Sinha	Bhakshak	Hindi	

== See also ==
- List of Indian film actors
