= Drohkaal =

1994 Indian crime drama film directed by Govind Nihalani

- Promotional Poster
- Directed by: Govind Nihalani
- Written by: Govind Purushottam Deshpande; Govind Nihalani; Anjum Rajabali; Atul Tiwari
- Starring: Om Puri; Naseeruddin Shah; Ashish Vidyarthi
- Cinematography: Govind Nihalani, Malay Roy
- Edited by: Dilip Panda
- Music by: Vanraj Bhatia; Anjan Biswas; Sunil Kaushik; Taufiq Qureshi
- Production company: Udbhav Productions
- Release date: 31 August 1994
- Running time: 162 minutes
- Country: India
- Language: Hindi

Drohkaal (transl. Times of Treason) is a 1994 Indian Hindi-language action drama film directed and produced by Govind Nihalani, which deals with India's fight against terrorism. The film examines the mental and psychological trauma that honest police officers go through in their fight against a group of ruthless terrorists. It was remade simultaneously in 1995 in Tamil and Telugu as Kuruthipunal and Drohi.

== Plot ==
In the film, Indian cities are being antagonized by a group of people who are pressuring the government to give in to their demands and are willing to go to any extent for that purpose. Interrogation expert DCP Abhay Singh and veteran spymaster DCP Abbas Lodhi are part of the anti-terrorism task force set up by the government to counteract the violence.

Abbas Lodhi decides to infiltrate a major terrorist group with two undercover cops, Sahadev and Shakti who are given new identities of Anand and Shiv respectively, to gather information. Named as Operation Dhanush, only Abbas, Abhay and their senior officer in New Delhi know about this operation.

Anand, one of the undercover cops, is exposed by the terrorists 3 years later. However, he dies by consuming cyanide, but not before in a pain fueled delirium, accidentally admits there is another spy in their midst: "Dhanush". But Shiv wins the trust and respect of everyone in the gang, including the mastermind Commander Bhadra himself.

Bhadra is captured and tortured by the police. But try as they may, he does not reveal anything to Abbas or Abhay, who do not know his real identity. While Bhadra is in jail, the gang chooses a RPG (Rocket Propelled Grenade) expert named Kishan, to kill a minister, and he does. But Kishan is apprehended and interrogated by Abhay, who informs Abhay that the man in their custody is Commander Bhadra. In order to prevent him from divulging more information, Bhadra orders his inside man, Inspector Tiwari to poison Kishan.

Soon, a respected officer IGP Pathak, who is a friend of Abhay and Lodhi, kills himself when the CBI comes to arrest him on charges of being linked with the terrorists. Abhay and Lodhi then realise there are many terrorist-allied infiltrators. Now Bhadra offers Abhay the chance to join with and help the terrorists, or else his family will be in danger. Abhay does not oblige. The terrorists kill the family dog, shoot Abhay's son in the leg, and send him threatening messages.

Abhay finally agrees. Bhadra asks Abhay to feign a kidnapping and allow him to escape, which he unwillingly does. Lodhi is shocked at Bhadra's escape and does not understand why Abhay is acting strangely.

Now outside, Bhadra sends two people, Surinder and Mala, to stay in Abhay's house, and asks the latter to accommodate them. The two of them keep Bhadra informed and threaten to kill Abhay's wife and child if he were to try anything at any time. Only Abhay knows their true identities.

Things start to get more serious, when Bhadra's second-in-command, Mangal Dev is killed by the police, which causes him to become more paranoid and alert.

Soon Bhadra meets Abhay, and under threat of his wife and child being killed by Bhadra's signalling to the couple at their house, Abhay reveals that it was Lodhi who had arranged for two undercover cops to be sent to the gang, and only he knows who Dhanush really is. Abhay also learns that Inspector Tiwari - having outlived his usefulness - has been eliminated.

The gang attacks Lodhi. He almost starts to fight them off, when he sees that one of the people sent to capture him is Shiv. The shock of seeing him surprises him enough for him to be overpowered and abducted. Lodhi is beaten, but he does not reveal who the inside man is. Soon he is killed accidentally by Bhadra's pistol. Abhay tells everything to Sumitra, who tells Abhay that as a Police officer, he has taken an oath to protect the nation, and he must go by that. She also says that she will take care of everyone and everything in his absence.

Consoled, Abhay is then called for a late-night meeting by Bhadra again. When he leaves for Lodhi's house first, Surinder tries to attack and rape Lodhi's daughter who was being taken care of by Abhay and his wife. At this point, Mala orders Surinder at gunpoint to leave the girl, but Surinder shoots Mala. Sumitra sees all this, and to save her Lodhi's daughter, seduces Surinder. Once in the bedroom, she pushes Surinder off and kills him with his own gun.

Abhay Singh is informed and he returns home, consoles his family, and bids them goodbye. He goes to meet Bhadra, where he attacks the criminal and is overpowered and bound to a chair. With only Shiv in the room, Commander Bhadra asks Abhay about the inside man and suddenly points the pistol at Shiv, having somehow realized that he was the spy. Abhay, taking advantage of Bhadra's attention on Shiv, attacks Bhadra, breaks free, and stabs him in the neck with the broken wood of the chair. On hearing the commotion, as the entire gang comes from outside to break into the room, Abhay tells Shiv to shoot him, because then it will appear as though Abhay was killed when he attacked Bhadra, and Shiv being highly trusted, would become the new gang leader. A reluctant Shiv does so, just as the gang enters. Shiv declares himself to be the terrorist gang leader, and the others accept his leadership. Abhay Singh then dies.

== Cast ==
- Om Puri as DCP Abhay Singh
- Naseeruddin Shah as DCP Abbas Lodhi
- Mita Vashisht as Sumitra Singh
- Ashish Vidyarthi as Commander Bhadra
- Amrish Puri as IGP Pathak
- Ila Arun as Zeenat
- Annu Kapoor as Surinder
- Milind Gunaji as Shiv
- Shrivallabh Vyas as Inspector Tiwari
- Manoj Bajpayee as Anand
- Vineet Kumar as Kishan
- Kitu Gidwani as Jaswanti (Kishan’s Wife)
- Joan David as Mala
- Shiv Kumar Subramaniam as Mangal Dev

== Music ==
A. R. Rahman was supposed to debut as a composer in Bollywood with Drohkaal, but his computer which contained the music for the film crashed and he never got the time to start over.

== Awards ==
Ashish Vidyarthi won the National Film Award for Best Supporting Actor. His performance was cited as "bringing credibility to his role with strength and total conviction". In 1996, Mita Vasisht won the Star Screen Award for Best Supporting Actress. In 1995, Nihalani won the Best Director Award at the Damascus International Film Festival for the film.
