= Bhonsle (film) =

2018 Indian drama film

- Film poster
- Directed by: Devashish Makhija
- Written by: Devashish Makhija; Mirat Trivedi; Sharanya Rajgopal
- Produced by: Shabana Raza Bajpayee; Piiyush Singh; Abhayanand Singh; Saurabh Gupta; Sandiip Kapoor
- Starring: Manoj Bajpayee; Santosh Juvekar
- Cinematography: Jigmet Wangchuk
- Edited by: Shweta Venkat Mathew
- Music by: Mangesh Dhakde
- Production companies: Muvizz; Manoj Bajpayee Productions
- Distributed by: SonyLIV
- Release dates: 5 October 2018 (Busan); 26 June 2020 (India)
- Running time: 128 minutes
- Country: India
- Language: Hindi

Bhonsle is a 2018 Indian Hindi-language drama film written and directed by Devashish Makhija and co-produced by Piiyush Singh, The film stars Manoj Bajpayee in the title role: a retired Mumbai police officer who befriends a North Indian girl and her brother who are targeted among other migrants by local politicians. Its first look was launched at the 2018 Cannes Film Festival.

Bhonsle premiered in the 'A Window on Asian Cinema' section of the 2018 Busan International Film Festival and was also screened in the non-competitive India Story section at the MAMI Film Festival, the 2018 Dharamshala International Film Festival, the 2019 International Film Festival Rotterdam, the Bengaluru International Film Festival and the Singapore South Asian film festival. It won the Best Screenplay and Best Director Award at the Asian Film Festival Barcelona. It was released on SonyLIV on 26 June 2020. Manoj Bajpayee won the National Film Award for Best Actor at the 67th National Film Awards.

== Plot ==
Constable Bhonsle retires from the Mumbai Police to live in a dilapidated chawl (a small apartment block for factory workers). He occasionally meets with his former superior about extending his service. An idol is shown being prepared for the ten-day Ganesh Chaturthi festival.

Homeless taxi driver Vilas is a foot soldier for a local political party which upholds local cultural identity, and blames migrants from North India for taking local jobs. He frequently gets into conflicts with Rajendra, who wants to lead the migrants. Vilas networks and unites influential locals to assert their identity. Bhonsle is respected in the community, but refuses to join Vilas.

Sita and her teenaged brother Lalu move next door to Bhonsle. Lalu refuses to join Rajendra's gang, but one night is tricked into vandalizing the billboard of Vilas's political party. The next day Vilas is irate and Lalu is frightened. After confessing to Sita, they inform Bhonsle who warns them that he will tell the police if it happens again.

A few days later, there is a grand procession for Ganesh Chaturthi which involves everyone from the chawl. Bhonsle collapses in his room from fading health. Lalu gathers their neighbours to take him to the hospital where Sita works, and she nurses him to health. She also takes care of the paperwork at his discharge, and he is given a discount on the assumption of being her family member. Bhonsle forms a bond with the siblings and helps Lalu secretly repaint the billboard. Sita receives Bhonsle's medical tests and informs him that he has a terminal brain tumor. Having acquired supplies to fix the billboard, Vilas takes credit when he finds it repainted in the morning. Bhonsle exposes his lie, and Vilas is humiliated that Bhonsle took the migrants side instead of his own.

Bhonsle is heartbroken when he is informed that his service extension with the police is contingent on a medical check-up. As Sita returns from her night shift, Vilas kidnaps her and then rapes her. Bhonsle finds Sita badly injured, and confronts Vilas, finding bloodstains in his taxi. The two fight and are both fatally injured, while on the last day of Ganesh Chaturthi the idol is sunk into the ocean.

== Cast ==
- Manoj Bajpayee as Ganpath Bhonsle
- Santosh Juvekar as Vilas
- Ipshita Chakraborty Singh as Sita
- Virat Vaibhav as Lalu
- Abhishek Banerjee as Rajendra
- Rajendra Sisadkar as Talpade
- Kailash Waghmare as Sawant
- Shrikant Yadav as Mhatre
- Neetu Pande as Mrs. Jha
- Dev Mehta as Ismail

== Production ==
Makhija started writing the script of Bhonsle in 2011 and completed it in 2015 but could not gain interest from producers. In 2016, Makhija directed an 11-minute short film titled Taandav starring Manoj Bajpayee, about a head constable who breaks out into a dance to deal with the strains of his life. Bajpayee had suggested him to make a short "to prove that they could carry off the idea". Makhija said that he made the short because he was not able to make Bhonsle. He said that the purpose of the short was to "show the world that a film about a havaldar (constable) could be interesting." Makhija took inspiration for Bhonsale's mannerisms from his father who had become "something else" after Makhija left for Mumbai from his hometown Kolkata. The script was selected by the National Film Development Corporation of India for their event, Film Bazaar in 2016.

The film's principal photography began on 21 October 2017. The Ganpati festival scene was shot for two days in Mumbai in August, forming a backdrop in the film. For the pullout shot on the day of the Ganpati immersion, Bajpayee was placed in the crowd of 70,000 people. The scene took six retakes to complete and throughout the shoot no one recognised Bajpayee. The filming was completed in late December 2017. Several scenes were shot in closed narrow spaces as Makhija wanted to "create a sense of suffocation".

== Reception ==
On the review aggregator website Rotten Tomatoes, 100% of 7 critics' reviews are positive, with an average rating of 6.3/10.

Deborah Young of The Hollywood Reporter praised Bajpayee's performance in the film and said that his "hermit retiree emerges as a quiet-spoken hero who opposes the racist hate-mongering around him with cool disdain." She felt that the film "builds tension well as it goes along", but called its first half "punishing". Anupam Kant Verma of Firstpost wrote: "To Makhija’s peculiar blend of technical proficiency and poetic beats, Bajpayee brings the gravitas and masterful restraint that tugs at the kite of the director’s imagination the moment it threatens to pull away, in effect, harmonising the film experience." J. Hurtado of Screen Anarchy wrote: "It's an exceptional film bolstered by a nearly silent performance from Manoj Bajpayee, one of India's finest actors, who also stepped in to produce the film when things were looking dire during production." He also included it in his list of 14 Favorite Indian Films of 2018.

=== Accolades ===
Award	Date of ceremony	Category	Recipient(s)	Result	Ref.
Asia Pacific Screen Awards	21 November 2019	UNESCO Award	Devashish Makhija	Nominated	
Asia Pacific Screen Awards	21 November 2019	Best Actor	Manoj Bajpayee	Won	
Asian Film Festival Barcelona	10 November 2019	Best Film	Devashish Makhija	Nominated	
Asian Film Festival Barcelona	10 November 2019	Best Director	Devashish Makhija	Won	
Asian Film Festival Barcelona	10 November 2019	Best Screenplay	Devashish Makhija, Sharanya Rajgopal and Mirat Trivedi	Won	
International Indian Film Academy Awards	4 June 2022	Best Actor	Manoj Bajpayee	Nominated	
Filmfare OTT Awards	19 December 2020	Best Film - Web Originals	Bhonsle	Nominated	
Filmfare OTT Awards	19 December 2020	Best Actor in A Web Original Film	Manoj Bajpayee	Nominated	
FOI Online Awards	31 January 2021	Best Actor in a Leading Role	Manoj Bajpayee	Won	
National Film Awards	22 March 2021	Best Actor	Manoj Bajpayee	Won	
