= Road (2002 film) =

2002 Indian film by Ram Gopal Varma

- Film poster
- Directed by: Rajat Mukherjee
- Written by: Rajnish Thakur
- Produced by: Ram Gopal Varma
- Starring: Vivek Oberoi; Antara Mali; Manoj Bajpayee
- Cinematography: Sudeep Chatterjee
- Edited by: Chandan Arora
- Music by: Songs: Sandesh Shandilya; Nitin Raikwar; Score: Amar Mohile
- Production company: Varma Corporation
- Release date: 27 September 2002
- Running time: 134 minutes
- Country: India
- Language: Hindi

Road is a 2002 Indian Hindi-language road comedy thriller film directed by Rajat Mukherjee and produced by Ram Gopal Varma. The film stars Vivek Oberoi, Antara Mali, and Manoj Bajpayee. An eloped couple Arvind (Vivek Oberoi) and Lakshmi (Antara Mali), en-route to Jodhpur from Delhi on a deserted highway, encounter a mad wayfarer (Vijay Raaz), a hitchhiker Babu (Manoj Bajpayee) who turns out to be a serial psychopathic killer, Inderpal (Makrand Deshpande), a happy-go-lucky, intelligent, and responsible truck driver, and an irresponsible, eccentric cop (Sayaji Shinde).

== Plot ==
Arvind and Lakshmi are in love and want to get married. However, Lakshmi's dad, a cop, is against their affair. Hence the two decide to elope from Delhi and travel to get married at Arvind's ancestral haveli in Rajgarh, Alwar, Rajasthan, by road, passing by a desert, in a Tata Safari.

After an escape from an aggravated assault by a mad wayfarer, they bump into a smooth-talking hitchhiker Babu, who is stranded in the middle of nowhere. Babu convinces the young couple to give him a lift. Travelling with Babu proves a nightmare for Arvind and Lakshmi as Babu turns out to be a psychopath. Soon, Lakshmi finds herself a hostage of an armed Babu. Thanks to the timely intervention of a truck driver Inderpal and the highway petrol bunk owner, an aspiring actor Bhanwar Singh, Arvind rescues Lakshmi from Babu.

After a while, Babu again finds a way, after attacking Inderpal, and again attacks the couple by haunting them on the road via Inderpal's truck. But, this time, Babu fails to get hold of the couple. After lodging an FIR, at the nearest police station, the couple finds a motel and they recuperate. The next day, Babu again attacks the couple and elopes with Lakshmi.

When the car breaks down on the way, Babu kills another victim, a traveller attracted to Lakshmi, and elopes in the traveller's vehicle. As the cops are on their way to catch hold of him, he manages to evade them.

On the other hand, the cops suspect Arvind as the serial killer, as he first eloped with Lakshmi, who is D.C.P's daughter. This irresponsible intervention of the cop, who fails to trust Arvind, makes it impossible to chase Lakshmi. Finally, a frustrated Arvind, manages to escape with the cops' jeep. The full focus of the police is now on Arvind as they believe him to have committed a murder and dumped the body in a car and that the story of Babu and Lakshmi is a fabrication. Arvind manages to flee to a small bar where he reunites with Inderpal. He and Inderpal now try to track Babu down with the help of Inderpal's truck but are spotted by the police who give a chase. Inderpal is injured in the gunfight and Arvind drives him to a hospital.

Meanwhile, Babu forces his way into a bungalow by attacking its caretaker while the owner was away. There, Lakshmi begins to show signs that she is on Babu's side. The caretaker of the house is tied up but manages to call the police on Babu. At the same time, the police also find Arvind's vehicle and in it, a photograph of himself and Lakshmi, indicating that Arvind is innocent and was telling the truth. At the hospital, Arvind has an encounter with the police and overcomes a cop and is about to tie him up when that cop gets informed through the radio that Arvind is innocent.

The police reach the bungalow the following morning where Babu kills two policemen before escaping. Arvind, finally having his name cleared, joins the police in chasing down Babu. He takes control of a police bike after its rider was shot down by Babu. Arvind chases Babu into the desert where the vehicle breaks down again. Babu and Lakshmi get out of the car and Arvind too gets off his bike and starts coming for Babu. Babu tells Lakshmi that there is only one bullet left in the gun and that will kill Arvind. However, just as he is about to shoot, Lakshmi attacks Babu, causing the last bullet to miss. Arvind takes advantage of the distraction and attacks Babu. Arvind badly beats Babu and the couple, reunited, leave Babu to die in the desert and continue on their journey on the police bike.

== Cast ==
- Vivek Oberoi as Arvind Chauhan
- Antara Mali as Lakshmi
- Manoj Bajpayee as Babu
- Sayaji Shinde as Inspector Singh
- Makrand Deshpande as Inderpal
- Rajpal Yadav as Bhanwar Singh
- Vijay Raaz as Mad Villager on the road
- Ganesh Yadav as Bungalow watchman
- Raj Zutshi as Kishan Bhai
- Snehal Dabi as Traveler on the road
- Koena Mitra in a special appearance in the item number "Khullam Khulla"

== Soundtrack ==
The soundtrack was composed by Sandesh Shandilya and Nitin Raikwar.

Title	Singer(s)	Lyricist	Music
"Makhmali Yeh Bandan"	Sonu Nigam, Sanjeevani	Khilesh Sharma	Sandesh Shandilya
"Toofan Sa Zor Hai Hum Mein"	Sunidhi Chauhan, KK	Nitin Raikwar	Nitin Raikwar
"Khullam Khulla Pyar Karen"	Sonu Nigam, Sunidhi Chauhan	Khilesh Sharma	Sandesh Shandilya
"Raste Raste"	Vinod Rathod, Sunidhi Chauhan	Jaideep Sahni	Sandesh Shandilya
"Pehli Nazar Mein"	Mohit Chauhan, Sunidhi Chauhan	Makarand Deshpande	Sandesh Shandilya
"Road Ke Har Mod Pe"	Gary Lawyer, Tannishtha Chatterjee	Taabish Romani	Sandesh Shandilya
