= Manoj Bajpayee =

Indian actor (born 1969)

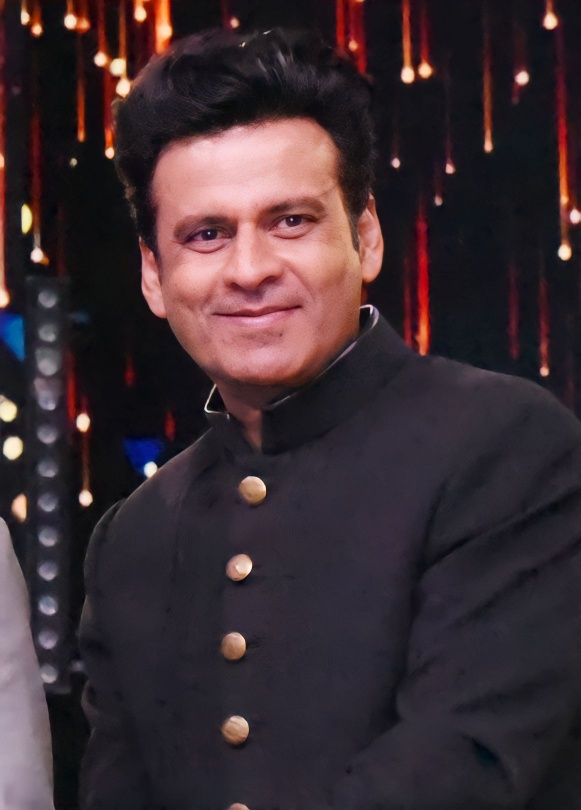
- Bajpayee in 2021
- Born: 23 April 1969 (age 57); Belwa, Bihar, India
- Education: Delhi University
- Occupation: Actor
- Years active: 1993–present
- Works: Full list
- Spouse: Shabana Raza (m. 2006)
- Children: 1
- Awards: Full list
- Honours: Padma Shri (2019)

Manoj Bajpayee (born 23 April 1969), also transliterated as Manoj Bajpai, is an Indian actor who predominantly works in Hindi cinema. He has appeared in over 70 films. A prolific actor of Indian cinema, he is the recipient of numerous accolades including four National Film Awards, four Filmfare Awards, and two Asia Pacific Screen Awards, making him one of the finest actors in Indian cinema. 2019, he was awarded the Padma Shri by the Government of India.

Born in a small village in Bihar, Bajpayee aspired to become an actor since childhood. He relocated to Delhi at the age of seventeen, and applied for the National School of Drama, was rejected four times. He continued to do theatre while studying in college. Bajpayee made his feature film debut with minor roles in Drohkaal (1994) and Bandit Queen (both 1994). He had his breakthrough playing a gangster in Ram Gopal Varma's 1998 crime drama Satya, for which he won the National Film Award for Best Supporting Actor and Filmfare Critics Award for Best Actor. He then acted in films such as Kaun? (1999) and Shool (1999). For the latter, he won his second Filmfare Critics Award for Best Actor.

Bajpayee won the Special Jury National Award for Pinjar (2003). This was followed by a series of brief, unnoticed roles in films that failed to propel his career forward. His reassurance marked with supporting role in political thriller Raajneeti (2010). In 2012, Bajpayee received widespread acclaim for the lead role in Gangs of Wasseypur. His next roles were as a Naxalite in Chakravyuh (2012), and a CBI officer in Special 26 (2013). In 2016, he portrayed Professor Ramchandra Siras, in Hansal Mehta's biographical drama Aligarh, for which he won his third Filmfare Critics Award for Best Actor and the Best Actor Award at the Asia Pacific Screen Awards. He won the National Film Award for Best Actor for his performance in the film Bhonsle. He also won the Filmfare OTT Award for Best Actor for the thriller series The Family Man (2021–present).

== Early and personal life ==
Manoj Bajpayee was born in a Hindu family of Bihar on 23 April 1969 in a small village called Belwa near the city Bettiah in West Champaran, Bihar. He is the second child among his five other siblings, and was named after actor Manoj Kumar. One of his younger sisters Poonam Dubey, is a fashion designer in the film industry. His father was a farmer and his mother was a housewife. As a son of a farmer, Bajpayee would do farming during their vacation. Since childhood, he wanted to become an actor.

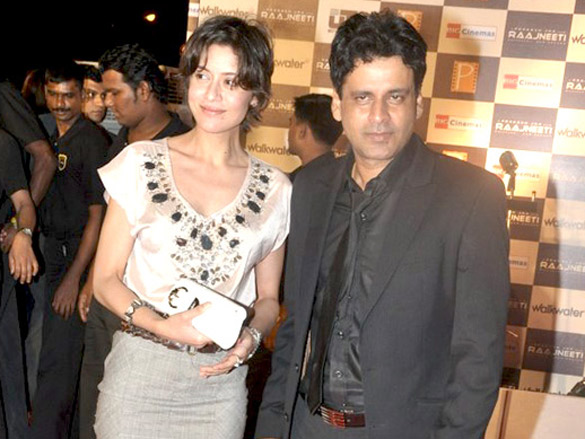
Bajpayee with his wife Shabana Raza at the premiere of Raajneeti in 2010

His father struggled to gather funds for their education. He studied in a "hut school" till fourth standard, and later did his schooling at Khrist Raja High School, Bettiah. He completed his 12th class from Maharani Janaki Kunwar College in Bettiah.

He moved to New Delhi at the age of seventeen and went to Satyawati, then to Ramjas College, Delhi University. Bajpayee had heard about the National School of Drama from actors such as Om Puri and Naseeruddin Shah, so he applied. He was rejected three times and wanted to commit suicide afterward. He then attended director and acting coach Barry John's workshop after actor Raghubir Yadav's suggestion. Impressed by Bajpayee's acting, John hired him to assist him in his teaching. After that he applied at the National School of Drama for the fourth time, and they offered him a teaching position at the school instead.

Bajpayee was married to a girl from Delhi, but got divorced during his period of struggle. He met actress Shabana Raza, who is also known as Neha, right after her debut film Kareeb (1998). The couple married in 2006 and they have a daughter.

== Career ==
=== 1994–2001: Debut and breakthrough ===
Following his one-minute role in Govind Nihalani's Drohkaal (1994), Bajpayee acted in the biographical drama Bandit Queen (1994). Tigmanshu Dhulia, the casting director of the film suggested his name to its director Shekhar Kapur. Bajpai was considered for the role of dacoit Vikram Mallah in the film, which eventually went to Nirmal Pandey. Bajpayee got the role of dacoit Mann Singh in the film. During that time, he also did a television serial called Kalakaar, directed by Hansal Mehta and Imtihaan (Doordarshan).

Bajpayee was a struggling actor when Mahesh Bhatt offered him the soap opera Swabhimaan (1995), which aired on Doordarshan. He agreed to do the serial at a low fee. Next, Bajpayee appeared in minor roles in films such as Dastak (1996) and Tamanna (1997). Director Ram Gopal Varma discovered Bajpayee when he was casting for Daud (1997), a comedy film, where he had a supporting role. Following completion of the filming, Varma expressed his regret for offering Bajpayee a minor role. He then promised Bajpayee a prominent role in his next film. Satya (1998), a crime drama, was their next film together. In the film, Bajpayee played gangster Bhiku Mhatre, who accompanies the title character to form their nexus in the Mumbai underworld.

Satya was mostly shot in the real slums of Mumbai. It was screened at the 1998 International Film Festival of India and opened to mostly positive reviews. Anupama Chopra called Bajpayee and others' performances "[..] so good that you can almost smell the Mumbai grime on their sweaty bodies." The film was a commercial success, and Bajpayee won the National Film Award for Best Supporting Actor and Filmfare Critics Award for Best Actor for his performance. Filmfare later included his performance in the 2010 issue of Bollywood's "Top 80 Iconic Performances". Bajpayee then collaborated with Verma in the year 1999 with Kaun? and Shool; with Verma directing the former and producing the latter. Kaun, was a whodunit with only three characters in a house, where Bajpayee played an annoying talkative stranger. The film was a box office disappointment. Shool saw him play the role of an honest police officer who finds himself in the politician-criminal nexus of the Motihari district in Bihar. Sify labelled Bajpayee's performance in the film as "truly amazing [..] especially the emotional scenes with Raveena Tandon." The film won the National Film Award for Best Feature Film in Hindi, with Bajpayee winning the Filmfare Critics Award for Best Performance. He also acted in the Telugu romantic film Prema Katha (1999).

The year 2000 started for Bajpayee with the comedy Dil Pe Mat Le Yaar!! and the crime drama Ghaath, both alongside Tabu. A dialogue from the former sparked controversy in some political parties. Bajpayee's first release in 2001 was Rakeysh Omprakash Mehra's supernatural thriller Aks. His negative portrayal of Raghavan Ghatge, a criminal who dies and is reincarnated in the body of Manu Verma (played by Amitabh Bachchan), garnered him the Filmfare Award for Best Performance in a Negative Role nomination. It was followed by Shyam Benegal's Zubeidaa, co-starring Rekha and Karisma Kapoor. He played Maharaja Vijayendra Singh of Fatehpur, a polo enthusiast prince with two wives. His character was inspired by Hanwant Singh, the Maharaja of Jodhpur.

=== 2002–09: Career struggle ===
Bajpayee's sole release of 2002 was the road thriller Road. He played the antagonist in the film, a hitchhiker who turns out to be a psychopathic killer, after taking a lift from a couple (played by Vivek Oberoi and Antara Mali). Bajpayee received another Filmfare nomination for Best Performance in a Negative Role, for the film. Pinjar (2003), a period drama, set during the partition of India, was Bajpayee's first release of the year. Directed by Chandraprakash Dwivedi, the film was based on a Punjabi novel of the same name. He received the National Film Special Jury Award for his performance in the film. He subsequently portrayed Grenadier Yogendra Singh Yadav in J. P. Dutta's ensemble war film LOC: Kargil. It was based on the Kargil War, and Bajpayee was nominated for the Filmfare Award for Best Supporting Actor for it. Both the films were commercially unsuccessful.

Bajpayee's next roles were in Jaago (2004) opposite Raveena Tandon, Makarand Deshpande's Hanan and the thriller Inteqam. In Jaago, he played a police officer who takes the situation into his own hands, after his 10-year-old daughter is raped and killed. The same year, he appeared in a supporting role in Yash Chopra's romantic drama Veer-Zaara (2004). The film was screened at the 55th Berlin Film Festival, and grossed over ₹940 million (US$9.8 million) globally, becoming the highest-grossing film of the year. In 2005, Bajpayee acted in Dharmesh Darshan's drama Bewafaa, the thriller Fareb, and the English language film Return to Rajapur. He also acted in the Telugu romance Happy (2006).

In 2007, Bajpayee played Major Suraj Singh in 1971. The film tells the story of six Indian army soldiers, who escape from the Pakistani prison after they were captured during the Indo-Pakistani War of 1971. Rajeev Masand of CNN-IBN, criticised the film but wrote: "[Bajpayee] is in great form, he holds back mostly and in the process, constructs a character that says more with his eyes than with words." He next starred opposite Juhi Chawla in Ganesh Acharya's drama film Swami. Bajpayee's final release of the year was the anthology film Dus Kahaniyaan. He acted in the Sanjay Gupta – directed story Zahir alongside Dia Mirza. All of his 2007 releases were financial failures. Next year, he starred in the ensemble comedy Money Hai Toh Honey Hai (2008), which was also a box office disaster.

Bajpayee's shoulder got injured while filming the Telugu film Vedam, and was absent from the screen for nearly two years. He then returned in a major role with the comedy Jugaad (2009), which was based on the 2006 Delhi sealing drive incident. His next release was the mystery thriller Acid Factory (2009), which was a remake of the 2006 American film Unknown. He played a comic role of one among the people who are kidnapped and locked in a factory with no memory of how they came there. The film did not do well at the box office. The string of financial failures continued with his next release. In Madhur Bhandarkar's Jail (2009), he played a convict serving life imprisonment. He called his role a "narrator" and "mentor" of its protagonist (played by Neil Nitin Mukesh).

=== 2010–present: Raajneeti and beyond ===
In 2010, Bajpayee starred in Prakash Jha's big-budget ensemble political thriller Raajneeti. Nikhat Kazmi of The Times of India in her review mentioned that Bajpayee "[..] grab[s] eyeballs in [his] scenes" and "brings back memories of his mesmeric performances." Indian trade journalists were apprehensive of Raajneeti recovering its ₹600 million (US$6.2 million) investment. The film, however, proved to be a major commercial success, with worldwide earnings of over ₹1.43 billion (US$15 million). Bajpayee received a Best Supporting Actor nomination at Filmfare for the film. He then acted in two Telugu films; Vedam (2010) and Puli (2010), followed by the comedy Dus Tola (2010). He also provided the voice of Rama in the animated film Ramayana: The Epic, which was based on the Indian epic Ramayana.

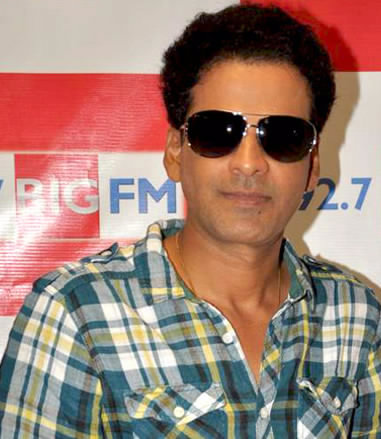
Bajpayee promoting Aarakshan in 2011

Aarakshan (2011), a socio-drama based on the issue of caste based reservations in Indian, was Bajpayee's next film. The film sparked controversy in some groups and was banned in Uttar Pradesh, Punjab and Andhra Pradesh before its theatrical release. Trade journalists had high expectations for the film, but it ultimately flopped at the box office. Bajpayee's followup was the thriller Lanka (2011).

In 2012, Bajpayee appeared in Anurag Kashyap's two-part crime film Gangs of Wasseypur. His character Sardar Khan appeared in the first one. To prepare for his role, Bajpayee shaved his head and lost four kilogram of weight. It premiered at the 2012 Cannes Film Festival, Toronto film festival, and the Sundance Film Festival in 2013. Gangs of Wasseypur released in India on 22 June to positive response. Anupama Chopra called it his best performance since Bhiku Mhatre in Satya. For his performance in the film, Bajpayee was nominated for the Filmfare Award for Best Actor. His next film was the historical drama Chittagong (2012), based on the Chittagong armoury raid. Bajpai portrayed the Bengali independence fighter Surya Sen in it, for which he charged no money. His final release of the year was Chakravyuh, where he played a Naxalite; a role which required him to lose 5 kilograms weight. Writer and lyricist Javed Akhtar called Chakravyuh "the best film of last 20 years". On the contrary, a review carried by India Today called it an "amateurish attempt", but praised Bajpayee's acting.

In 2013, Bajpayee had five releases: Samar, his Tamil debut film, was the first release. He appeared in a supporting role in the film. He then appeared in Neeraj Pandey's heist thriller Special 26. Based on the 1987 Opera House heist, he portrayed a CBI officer in the film. It was followed by the crime film Shootout at Wadala, where he played a character inspired by the gangster Shabir Ibrahim Kaskar. Bajpayee collaborated with Prakash Jha for the fourth time with Satyagraha. The film was loosely inspired by social activist Anna Hazare's fight against corruption in 2011, featuring an ensemble cast, the film was highly anticipated by trade journalists due to its release coinciding with the Mumbai and Delhi gang rape public protests. Satyagraha earned ₹675 million (US$7.0 million) domestically. Bajpayee then provided the voice of Yudhishthira for Mahabharat, a 3D animation film based on the Indian epic of the same name. In 2014, Bajpayee played the antagonist in the Tamil action film Anjaan.

Bajpayee continued to play negative roles with his next film Tevar (2015). A remake of the 2003 Telugu film Okkadu, the film opened to negative reviews and was a box office failure. The same year, he along with Raveena Tandon, appeared in the patriotic-themed short film Jai Hind. With a run-time of 6 minutes, the film was released on YouTube by OYO Rooms, right before the Indian Independence Day. Bajpayee acted in another short film titled Taandav in 2016. Directed by Devashish Makhija, the film showcased the pressure and scenarios faced by an honest police constable, and was released on YouTube. The same year, he portrayed professor Ramchandra Siras, in Hansal Mehta's biographical drama Aligarh. The story followed the life of a homosexual professor who was expelled from Aligarh Muslim University because of his sexuality. Bajpayee watched a few clippings of Siras to prepare for his role. The film was screened at the 20th Busan International Film Festival, and the 2015 Mumbai Film Festival. Aligarh was released on 26 February 2016 to positive reviews. Bajpayee won the Best Actor award at the 10th Asia Pacific Screen Awards and his third Filmfare Critics Award for Best Actor. He next played a traffic constable in Rajesh Pillai's swan song Traffic (2016). A remake of the Malayalam film of the same name, the film was released on 6 May 2016. His subsequent release of the year was the biographical sports film Budhia Singh – Born to Run, where he played the coach of Budhia Singh; the world's youngest marathon runner. It was followed by the comedy film Saat Uchakkey (2016) and the short film Ouch directed by Neeraj Pandey.

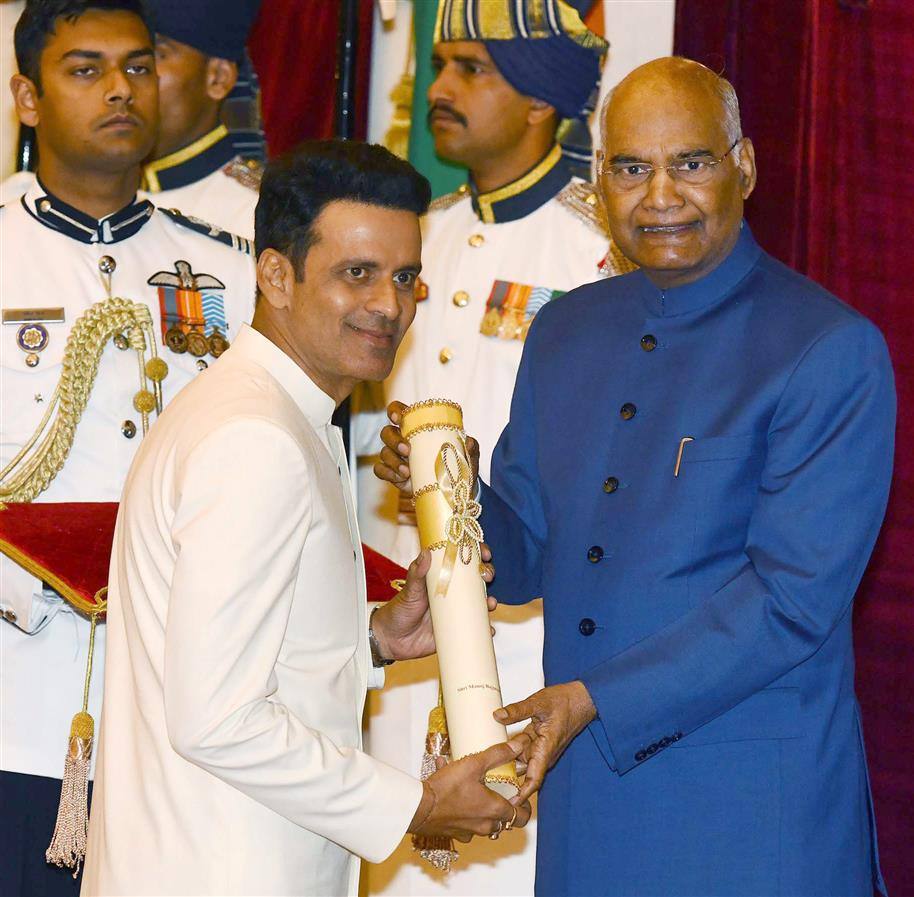
Bajpayee receiving the Padma Shri in 2019

Bajpayee's first release of 2017 was the spy thriller Naam Shabana, a spin-off to the 2015 film Baby with Taapsee Pannu reprising her role as Shabana. The same year, he reunited with Ram Gopal Varma for the crime drama Sarkar 3. It was the third instalment in the Sarkar film series. In the film, his character was loosely based on Arvind Kejriwal. Later that year, Bajpayee appeared briefly in the drama film Rukh.

In 2018, Bajpayee reunited with Neeraj Pandey with the crime thriller Aiyaary, where he played Colonel Abhay Singh who is in pursuit of his protege Major Jai Bakshi (Sidharth Malhotra). Film critic Namrata Joshi criticised the film's plot and called Bajpayee and one song, the "film's only saving graces". He later appeared in Ahmed Khan's Baaghi 2, alongside Tiger Shroff and Disha Patani. Later that year, Bajpayee acted and made his debut as a producer with the psychological thriller Missing, co-starring Tabu. The film mostly received negative review from critics. Shubhra Gupta called it a "shoddy mess". He next appeared alongside John Abraham in the vigilante action film Satyameva Jayate (2018). The same year he appeared in the psychological drama Gali Guleiyan, directed by debutant Dipesh Jain, where he played an electrician living in Old Delhi, who starts losing his grasp over reality. He won the Best Actor award at the Indian Film Festival of Melbourne. The film premiered at the 22nd Busan International Film Festival and was also screened at the 2017 MAMI Film Festival, Indian Film Festival of Los Angeles, Atlanta Film Festival, Cleveland International Film Festival and the Chicago International Film Festival. His final release of the year was Tabrez Noorani's ensemble drama Love Sonia, a film about sex trafficking. It had its premiere at the 2018 London Indian Film Festival and was released in India on 14 September 2018.

In Devashish Makhija's Bhonsle, Bajpayee played a terminally ill retired Mumbai cop who befriends a North Indian girl when the locals are trying to get rid of the migrants in the city. The film and his performance met with positive response from critics with Namrata Joshi calling his acting "astounding in his internalisation of Bhonsle and acts with not just his face but by deploying his whole body." The role earned him his first National Film Award for Best Actor and second Asia Pacific Screen Award for Best Performance by an Actor.

In 2019, he was given India's fourth highest civilian honour Padma Shri for his contributions to art. The same year he portrayed dacoit Man Singh in Abhishek Chaubey's action film Sonchiriya. Raja Sen in his review wrote that Bajpayee is "excellent as a rebel chief." Later, he appeared in the spy action drama web series The Family Man, directed by Raj Nidimoru and Krishna D.K. Bajpayee played the role of Srikant Tiwari, a middle-class man who secretly works for an intelligence agency. The series and his performance received positive response from critics with Rohit Naahar of Hindustan Times writing: "Manoj Bajpayee is, as he usually tends to be, effortlessly excellent." He won the Critics Choice Best Actor, Drama Series Award at the 2020 Filmfare OTT Awards.

In 2020, Bajpayee did a supporting role in Shirish Kunder's crime thriller film Mrs. Serial Killer, co-starring Jacqueline Fernandez. The film, which was released on Netflix, met with a negative response. His final release of the year was the comedy flick Suraj Pe Mangal Bhari alongside Diljit Dosanjh and Fatima Sana Shaikh. It was the first film to release theatrically in India after nearly eight months due to the COVID-19 pandemic. The next year, he narrated the Discovery+ documentary show Secrets of Sinauli, directed by Neeraj Pandey. Bajpayee also appeared as a cop trying to solve a murder case in the thriller Silence... Can You Hear It?. The film was released on ZEE5 and met with mixed critical feedback.

== Acting style and influence ==
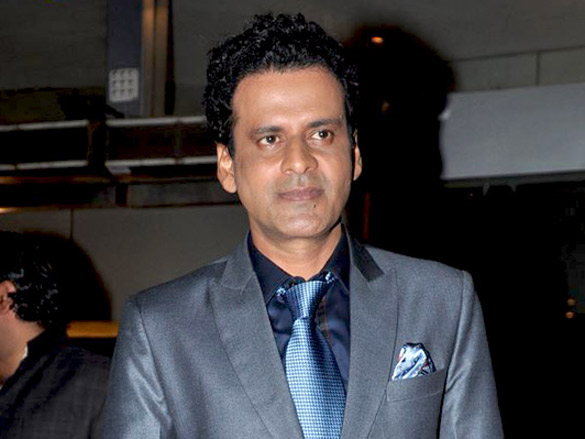
Bajpayee in 2011 during Aarakshan screening

Bajpayee is a method actor and a director's actor, and is known for his unconventional roles in films. Actor Nawazuddin Siddiqui has cited Bajpayee's performance in Aks as the inspiration for his role as the antagonist in Kick (2014). Bajpayee has also been vocal about the disparity in the pay he commands, in comparison to the top actors in the film industry. He has cited Amitabh Bachchan, Naseeruddin Shah and Raghubir Yadav as his inspirations.

Director Ram Gopal Varma considers him to be "an education" for himself and said he is "simply the best actor I've ever worked with." Shekhar Kapur, who directed him in Bandit Queen, recalls: "Manoj had the ability to portray a lot just by doing little. He never tried to overplay a scene and seemed totally comfortable with a minimalist statement." According to director Hansal Mehta, Manoj "has the ability to transform himself like few others."

Bajpayee's performance as Bhiku Mhatre in Satya is considered to be one of the most memorable characters of Hindi cinema, along with his dialogue in it: "Mumbai ka king kaun? Bhiku Mhatre" (Who is the king of Mumbai? Bhiku Mhatre). Kay Kay Menon credits this character as a turning point for other method actors: "If it were not for Manoj's brilliant performance in Satya, actors like Irrfan and me might still be waiting to be accepted. Manoj opened the doors for us." Writing about the character in his book Popcorn Essayists, journalist-writer Jai Arjun Singh wrote that "the "earthiness" and the "authenticity" [of the character], was the subtle result of a persistence in Bajpai's performance."

== Sources ==
- Ahmed, Omar (2015). Studying Indian Cinema. Columbia University Press. p. 204. ISBN 978-0-9932384-9-9.
- Raj, Ashok (2009). Hero Vol.2. Hay House. p. 202. ISBN 9789381398036.
- Jai, Arjun Singh (2011). Popcorn Essayists. Westland. p. 70. ISBN 9789380658353.
