= Aishwarya Rai filmography =

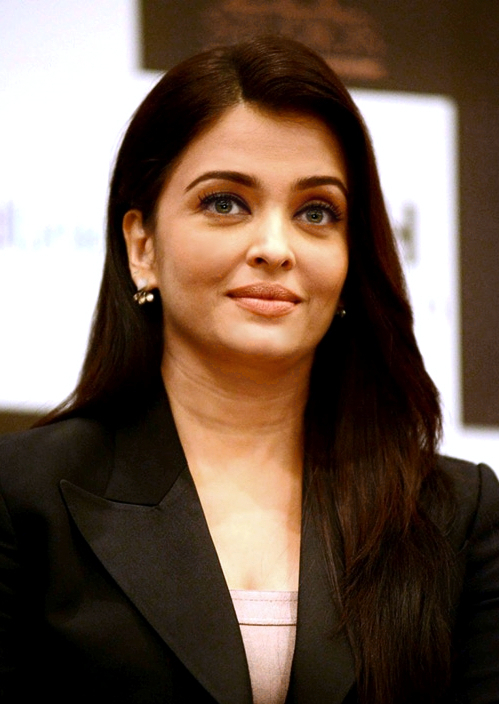
Rai in 2015

Aishwarya Rai is an Indian actress who has appeared in 50 films in five languages, predominantly in Hindi and Tamil. She made her acting debut in 1997 with dual role in Mani Ratnam's Tamil political drama film Iruvar, and her Bollywood debut that same year in the romantic comedy Aur Pyaar Ho Gaya opposite Bobby Deol. Rai followed it with a leading role in Jeans (1998), a high-profile Tamil film that was submitted as India's official entry to the Academy Awards. She won the Filmfare Award for Best Actress for her breakthrough role in Sanjay Leela Bhansali's romantic drama Hum Dil De Chuke Sanam and starred as a singer in the musical drama Taal (both 1999).

Rai had six film releases in 2000, including Kandukondain Kandukondain, a Tamil adaptation of Jane Austen's novel Sense and Sensibility, and Aditya Chopra's romantic drama Mohabbatein. In 2002, Rai starred opposite Shah Rukh Khan in Bhansali's period romance Devdas, an adaptation of the novel of the same name. Her performance in the top-grossing production earned her a second Best Actress award at Filmfare. In 2003, Rai played a sexually repressed widow in Rituparno Ghosh's Bengali film Chokher Bali, a sleeper hit. However, the failure of her two Hindi film releases of the year—Dil Ka Rishta and Kuch Naa Kaho—led to a setback in her Bollywood career. The following year, Rai played a character based on Elizabeth Bennet in a Bollywood-style adaptation of Austen's novel Pride and Prejudice, entitled Bride and Prejudice, a British production directed by Gurinder Chadha. Also in 2004, she reunited with Ghosh to play an unhappily married woman in the drama Raincoat.

In 2006, Rai featured as a thief in the action film Dhoom 2, her biggest commercial success since Devdas. She followed it by playing the leading lady opposite Abhishek Bachchan in Ratnam's drama Guru (2007), a box office hit. Also in 2007, Rai appeared in her first Hollywood production—the unremarkable The Last Legion. Greater success came to her (as Rai Bachchan) with the role of Jodhaa Bai opposite Hrithik Roshan's Akbar in the historical drama Jodhaa Akbar (2008). Rai Bachchan had five film releases in 2010, including the ₹250 crore (US$27 million)-grossing Tamil science fiction film Enthiran co-starring Rajinikanth. She also played a quadriplegic's nurse in Bhansali's acclaimed drama Guzaarish. After a sabbatical, Rai Bachchan made her comeback with Jazbaa (2015), a remake of the South Korean film Seven Days, and took on the supporting part of a poetess in Karan Johar's commercially successful romance Ae Dil Hai Mushkil. She reunited with Ratnam for the two-part period films Ponniyin Selvan: I (2022) and Ponniyin Selvan: II (2023); the former earned ₹500 crore (US$53 million) to rank as her highest-grossing release and one of the highest-grossing Tamil films.

== Films ==
Year	Film	Role	Language	Notes	Ref.
1997	Iruvar	Pushpavalli & Kalpana^{[I]}	Tamil		
1997	Aur Pyaar Ho Gaya	Ashi Kapoor	Hindi		
1998	Jeans	Madhumitha/Vaishnavi^{[II]}	Tamil		
1999	Ravoyi Chandamama	Dancer	Telugu	Special appearance in the song "Love to Live"	
1999	Aa Ab Laut Chalen	Pooja Walia	Hindi		
1999	Hum Dil De Chuke Sanam	Nandini Darbar	Hindi		
1999	Taal	Mansi Shankar Manhuja	Hindi		
2000	Kandukondain Kandukondain	Meenakshi	Tamil		
2000	Josh	Shirley Dias	Hindi		
2000	Hamara Dil Aapke Paas Hai	Preeti Vyas	Hindi		
2000	Dhai Akshar Prem Ke	Sahiba Grewal	Hindi		
2000	Mohabbatein	Megha Shankar	Hindi		
2000	Mela	Champakali	Hindi	Special appearance	
2001	Albela	Sonia Heinz	HIndi		
2002	Devdas	Paro	Hindi		
2002	Hum Kisise Kum Nahin	Komal Rastogi	Hindi		
2002	Hum Tumhare Hain Sanam	Suman	Hindi	Special appearance	
2002	23rd March 1931: Shaheed	Mannawali	HIndi		
2002	Shakti: The Power	Dancer	Hindi	Special appearance in the song "Ishq Kamina"	
2003	Chokher Bali	Binodini	Bengali		
2003	Dil Ka Rishta	Tia Sharma	Hindi		
2003	Kuch Naa Kaho	Namrata Shrivastav	Hindi		
2004	Khakee	Mahalakshmi	Hindi		
2004	Kyun! Ho Gaya Na...	Diya Malhotra	HIndi		
2004	Raincoat	Neerja	Hindi		
2004	Bride and Prejudice	Lalita Bakshi	English		
2005	Shabd	Antara Vashist/ Tammana^{[II]}	Hindi		
2005	Bunty Aur Babli	Dancer	Hindi	Special appearance in the song "Kajra Re"	
2006	The Mistress of Spices	Tilo	English		
2006	Umrao Jaan	Umrao Jaan	Hindi		
2006	Dhoom 2	Sunehri Kaur	Hindi		
2007	Guru	Sujata Desai	Hindi		
2007	Provoked	Kiranjit Ahluwalia	English		
2007	The Last Legion	Mira	English		
2008	Jodhaa Akbar	Jodhaa Bai	Hindi		
2008	Sarkar Raj	Anita Rajan	Hindi		
2009	The Pink Panther 2	Sonia Solandres	English		
2010	Enthiran	Sana	Tamil/Hindi		
2010	Raavanan	Ragini Subramaniam	Tamil		
2010	Raavan	Ragini Sharma	Hindi		
2010	Action Replayy	Mala Malhotra Chopra	Hindi		
2010	Guzaarish	Sofia D'Souza	HIndi		
2011	Bollywood: The Greatest Love Story Ever Told	Herself	English/ Hindi	Documentary	
2015	Jazbaa	Anuradha Verma	Hindi		
2016	Sarbjit	Dalbir Kaur	Hindi		
2016	Ae Dil Hai Mushkil	Saba Taliyar Khan	Hindi		
2018	Fanney Khan	Sumitra "Baby" Singh	Hindi		
2022	Ponniyin Selvan: I	Nandini & Oomai Rani^{[I]}	Tamil		
2023	Ponniyin Selvan: II	Nandini & Oomai Rani^{[I]}	Tamil		

== Footnotes ==
^{^[I]}Rai played dual roles in the film.
^{^[II]}Rai played a single character who has two different names in the film.

== See also ==
- Awards and nominations received by Aishwarya Rai
