= List of awards and nominations received by Aishwarya Rai =

Aishwarya Rai awards and nominations
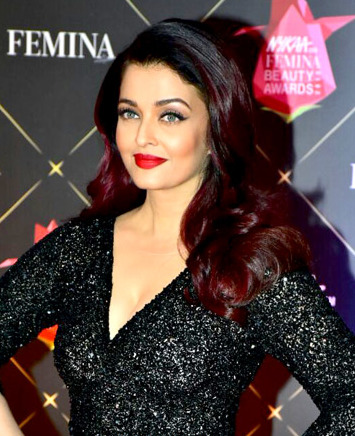
- Rai at the Nykaa Femina Beauty Awards in 2018
Awards and nominations
Award	Wins	Nominations
International Indian Film Academy Awards	6	10
Zee Cine Awards	6	12
Stardust Awards	4	10
Screen Awards	6	15
Filmfare Awards	2	9
Others	123	42

Totals (Note: Certain award groups do not simply award one winner. They acknowledge several different recipients, have runners-up, and have third place. Since this is a specific recognition and is different from losing an award, runner-up mentions are considered wins in this award tally. For simplification and to avoid errors, each award in this list has been presumed to have had a prior nomination.)
- Wins: 147
- Nominations: 98

Aishwarya Rai is an Indian actress and former model. Rai was the first runner-up at Femina Miss India in 1994 who also represented and won the Miss World 1994, as the winner of the Femina Miss India Sushmita Sen represented at Miss Universe 1994 and was crowned earlier that year. She is the recipient of over 145 accolades. In 2009, she was awarded a Padma Shri for her contribution to Indian cinema. Rai has also received two Filmfare Awards awards for Best Actress, and has been honoured numerous times at Screen Awards and IIFA Awards ceremonies for her on-screen performances. She has won numerous awards at the International Indian Film Academy Awards, Star Screen Awards and Zee Cine Awards, among other ceremonies.

After a brief stint with modeling, Rai made her cinematic debut through the 1997 Tamil film Iruvar, a semi-biographical political drama, directed by Mani Ratnam. She followed with Aur Pyaar Ho Gaya, which marked her Bollywood debut, and Jeans, her first commercial success. The latter was India's submission for the Academy Award for Best Foreign Language Film for the year 1998.

In 1999 Rai received critical acclaim and several Best Actress awards for her performances in Hum Dil De Chuke Sanam and Taal; both films earned her a Filmfare Award for Best Actress nomination, with the former fetching her the award. The following year, she starred in Aditya Chopra's musical romantic drama Mohabbatein, which earned her a Filmfare Award for Best Supporting Actress nomination—her only nomination in the category until date—and was the highest-grossing film of the year. Rai received her second Filmfare Award for Best Actress for her role as "Parvati" in the period romantic drama Devdas (2002). Rai was appointed the member of the jury of the 2003 Cannes Film Festival; she was the first Indian actress to represent her country as a jury member in the festival.

After a brief hiatus, Rai acted in the heist thriller Dhoom 2 (2006). The film featuring an ensemble cast was her first major commercial success post the release of Devdas. She won Most Glamorous Star of the Year along with Hrithik Roshan for Dhoom 2 in 2007. In the same year, she collaborated with Mani Ratnam for the second time in his biographical film, Guru. She portrayed the role of her future husband Abhishek Bachchan's wife gaining her a seventh Filmfare Award for Best Actress nomination. Rai Bachchan's portrayal as Jodhaa Bai in the 2008 epic film Jodhaa Akbar earned her another Filmfare nomination for Best Actress. She won the Outstanding Achievement in International Cinema at Awards of the International Indian Film Academy in 2009. In 2009, Rai Bachchan was awarded the Padma Shri, the fourth-highest Indian civilian award, for her contributions to Indian cinema. Later that year, she was declared the Female Star of The Decade at the 10th IIFA Awards, held in Macau.

In 2010, she made a comeback to Tamil film industry through Mani Ratnam's Raavanan and Shankar's science fiction film Enthiran. (Note: Raavanan was made separately in Hindi and released as Raavan.) Rai Bachchan was nominated for the Best Actress for the ninth time for her performance in Guzaarish (2010); her third collaboration with Sanjay Leela Bhansali. In December 2010, she was declared the Actress of the Decade at the BIG Star Entertainment Awards. In March 2011, Rai Bachchan was honoured by Karnataka Chief Minister B. S. Yeddyurappa at World Kannada Meet (Vishwa Kannada Sammelana) for her contributions to the arts. Later that month, she was presented with the Decade of Global Achievement Honour by FICCI.

In 2012, she finally accepted the second-highest Order of France, Ordre des Arts et des Lettres. Earlier, she refused it because her father was suffering from a serious illness, and she wanted her whole family to attend the award ceremony. In a poll conducted by HollywoodBuzz to find "Top 30 World's Most Beautiful Women of 2014", Rai Bachchan made it to the fourth position winning over 4 million votes from around the globe. During the Miss World 2014 award ceremony, Rai Bachchan was presented with a special Lifetime Beauty with a Purpose award for charitable work.

== National honours and recognitions ==
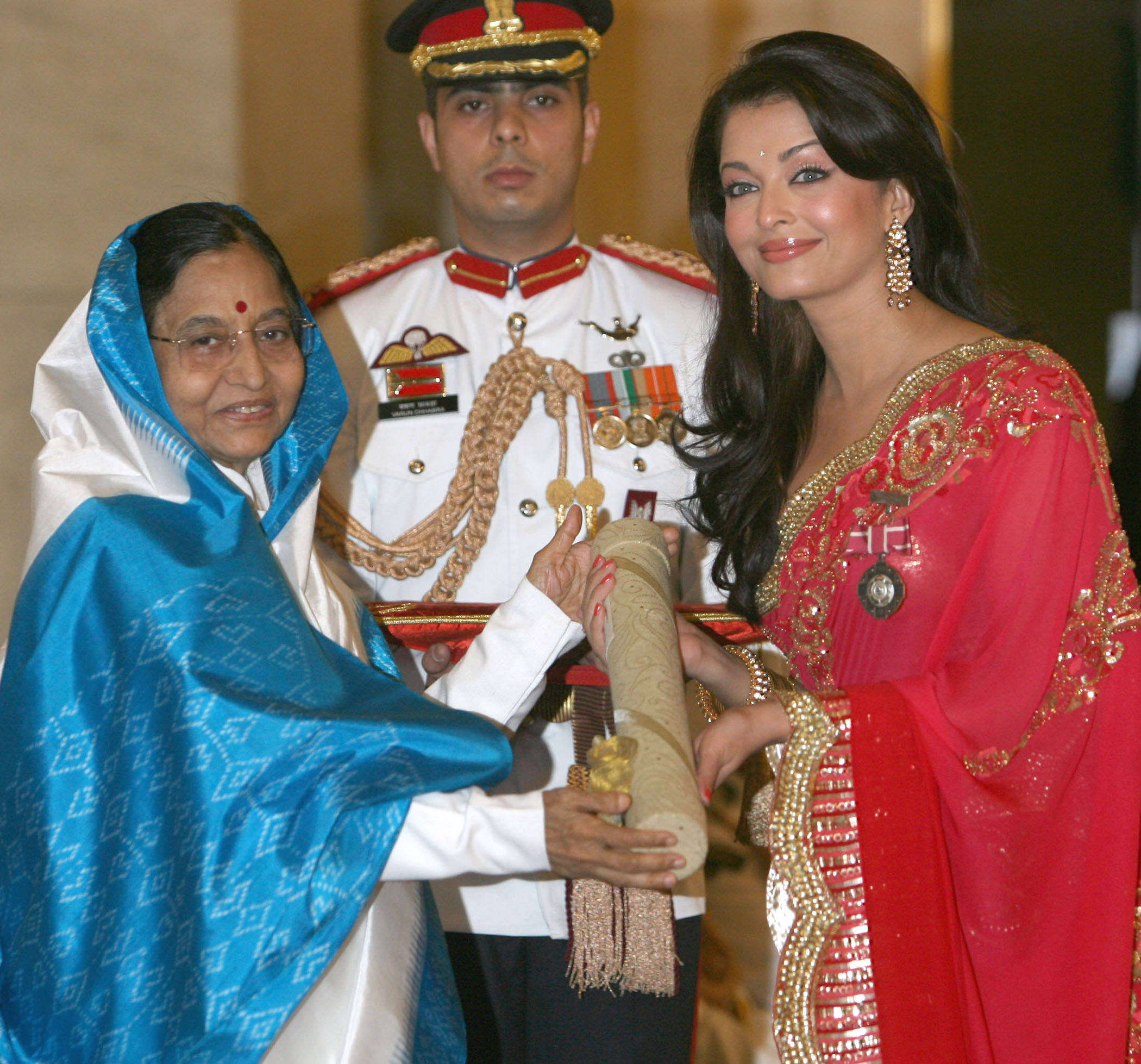
The 12th president of India, Pratibha Patil presenting the Padma Shri award to Rai, at the Civil Investiture Ceremony, at Rashtrapati Bhavan, in New Delhi on 31 March 2009

- 1994 – First runner-up at Femina Miss India
- 2000 – Smita Patil Memorial Award for Best Actress.
- 2002 – The Times of India named Aishwarya Rai No.1 on the list of the "100 Most Beautiful Indian Women in the Past Century".
- 2002 – Rajiv Gandhi Award for Excellence in Field of Entertainment.
- 2003 – V. Shantaram Awards – Best Actress for Devdas
- 2004 – GR8! Women Award for Contribution to Cinema(Special Laurel).
- 2007 – Femina "Most Powerful Indian Woman".
- 2008 – She was selected by Verve in its list of the country's "Most Powerful Women"
- 2009 – V. Shantaram Awards – Best Actress for Jodhaa Akbar
- 2009 – Padma Shri, India's fourth highest civilian award from the Government of India for her contribution to cinema. She created a history by being the youngest actress to receive the award.
- 2009 – Verve "Most Influential Indian Woman".
- 2009 – Declared as "The Most Powerful Female Actor in India". The first ever extensive research by a popular research agency (Hansa Research) that was conducted of such magnitude to measure Celebrity Power in India; concentrating on different attributes like Popularity, media presence, power of persuasion and image attributes. This all India research also revealed that Aishwarya Rai Bachchan is amongst the most persuasive and likeable celebrity in India. She has also garnered over 98.8% of recognition as well as recall value which is at par with cinematic legends like Amitabh Bachchan and cricketing star Sachin Tendulkar. Incidentally, she is the only female who is part of the top 10 recognized celebrities from all walks of life.
- 2009 – Filmfare's "Most Beautiful People".
- 2010 – The India Today Women Award for Global Achievement.
- 2010 – GR8! Women Award for Social services and international recognition.
- 2010 – Teacher's Achievement Award – Teacher's people achievers award.
- 2011 – Femina "India's Most Beautiful Woman".
- 2011 – A newer variety of guava, produced by Padma Shri holticulturist Haji Kaleemullah was named after her.
- 2011 – FICCI Frames Excellence Awards – Decade of Global Achievement for contribution to Hindi cinema & acting.
- 2011 – FICCI Frames Award of a Decade of Global Achievement
- 2011 – Honoured with the Pazhassi Raja Purashkaram ‘Abhinaya Kaala Ratna’ instituted by the Pazhassi Raja Charitable Trust.
- 2011 – Honoured by Karnataka Chief Minister B. S. Yeddyurappa at World Kannada Meet (Vishwa Kannada Sammelana) for her contributions to the arts.
- 2012 – Ranked #2 among top "5 Indian Women Who Became Role Models Of Empowerment" alongside Mother Teresa, Kalpana Chawla, Indra Nooyi and Indira Gandhi.
- 2013 – Filmfare Special Centenary Award for Best Actress
- 2013 – Giant Award – Outstanding Contribution to Indian Cinema
- 2013 –"Most Popular Actress"(Rank #1) in Filmfare 100 years of cinema issue.
- 2013 – Ranked #2 in "Top 5 Global Icon" in Filmfare 100 years of cinema issue where Rai is the only Female in the list.
- 2014 – Asiavision Awards – Icon Of India.
- 2014 – The Times Of India's Forever Desirable woman.
- 2015 – Hello! "India's Most Beautiful".
- 2016 – Outlook Business Outstanding Women Awards – Outstanding Celebrity Woman of the Year.
- 2016 – NRI of the Year Award – Global Indian of the Year Award
- 2016 – Gauravvanta Gujarati Award
- 2017 – Femina "Most Beautiful Indian Woman".
- 2018 – 20 January 2018, Aishwarya Rai Honoured with First Ladies Award by President of India (Ram Nath Kovind) – Titled as the First Lady who had created a history by being the first actor to be recognised as a Global Icon from India and the first Indian actor to be a jury member at the prestigious Cannes Film Festival.Honouring her for these great achievements, the Ministry of Women and Child Development of Government of India has added her in the list of 112 women achievers who have achieved a first in any field and made the country proud.
- 2018 – April 2018, Bunt Community Honoured Aishwarya Rai with "Woman of Substance" title.
- 2018 – Femina "India's Most Beautiful Woman 2018"

== Miss World ==
Miss World is "The World's Oldest Running International Beauty Pageant". It was created in the United Kingdom by Eric Morley in 1951. Since Morley's death in 2000, Morley's widow, Julia Morley, has co-chaired the pageant. This pageant is one of the Big Four international beauty pageants—the most coveted beauty titles when it comes to international pageant competitions.

Winner

- 1994 – Miss World 1994 Miss Photogenic
- 2000 – Most Beautiful Miss World of All Time – Received the highest score of 9.911.
- 2014 – Most Successful Miss World of All Time by the Miss World Organisation.
- 2014 – Lifetime Beauty With a Purpose Award for humanitarian works by Miss World Organisation.

== Miss India ==
Miss India or Femina Miss India is a national beauty pageant in India that annually selects representatives to compete in Miss World, one of the Big Four major international beauty pageants. It is organised by Femina, a women's magazine published by The Times Group. Since 2013, Femina also organizes Miss Diva separately which sends representatives to Miss Universe.

Winner

- 1994 – Miss Photogenic
- 1994 – Miss Perfect Ten
- 1994 – Miss Catwalk
- 1994 – Miss Popular
- 1994 – Miss Miraculous

== Anandalok Puraskar Awards ==
Anandalok Puraskar Awards or Anandalok Puraskar (Bengali: আনন্দলোক পুরস্কার ) ceremony is one of the most prominent film events given for Bengali Cinemas in India. The Anandalok, only film magazine in Bengali language, published from Ananda Publishers and Ananda Bazar Patrika presents this Award (Puraskar).

Year	Film	Category	Result	Ref.
2010	Raavan	Best Actress (Hindi)	Won	

== Ananda Vikatan Cinema Awards ==
Year	Film	Category	Result	Ref.
2023	Ponniyin Selvan: I	Best Female Actor in a Negative Role	Won	

== BIG Star Entertainment Awards ==
The BIG Star Entertainment Awards are presented annually by Reliance Broadcast Network Limited in association with Star India to honour personalities from the field of entertainment across movies, music, television, sports, theatre and dance. The award is touted to be a completely viewer driven award where in audience participation right from nominations to the final winners through SMS and online voting across the categories is used for deciding the winners.

Year	Film	Category	Result	Ref.
2010	Guzaarish	Most Entertaining Film Actor – Female	Nominated	
2010	—N/a	Film Actor of Decade – Female	Won	
2015	Jazbaa	Best Actor in an Action Role – Male / Female	Nominated	
2017 (Note: as Big ZEE Entertainment Awards.)	Sarbjit	Most Entertaining Film Actor – Female	Nominated	
2017	Sarbjit	Most Entertaining Actor in a Drama Film – Female	Won	
2017	Ae Dil Hai Mushkil	Most Entertaining Actor in a Romantic Film – Female	Won	

== Bollywood Movie Awards ==
The Bollywood Movie Awards was an annual film award ceremony held between 1999 and 2007 in Long Island, New York, United States, celebrating films and actors from the Bollywood film industry based in Mumbai, India.

Year	Film	Category	Result	Ref.
2000 (Note: as Zee Gold Bollywood Awards.)	Taal	Best Actress	Won	
2000	Taal	Best Actress in a Sensational Role	Won	
2000	Hum Dil De Chuke Sanam	Best Actress (Critics)	Won	
2001	Hamara Dil Aapke Paas Hai	Best Actress	Nominated	
2003	Devdas	Best Actress	Won	
2007	Dhoom 2	Best Actress	Nominated	

== Filmfare Awards ==
The Filmfare Awards are presented annually by The Times Group to honour both artistic and technical excellence of professionals. The Filmfare ceremony is one of the oldest film events in India. The awards were first introduced in 1954, the same year as the National Film Awards. Rai has won 2 awards from 11 nominations.

Year	Film	Category	Result	Ref.
2000	Hum Dil De Chuke Sanam	Best Actress	Won	
2000	Taal	Best Actress	Nominated	
2001	Hamara Dil Aapke Paas Hai	Best Actress	Nominated	
2001	Mohabbatein	Best Supporting Actress	Nominated	
2003	Devdas	Best Actress	Won	
2005	Raincoat	Best Actress	Nominated	
2007	Dhoom 2	Best Actress	Nominated	
2008	Guru	Best Actress	Nominated	
2009	Jodhaa Akbar	Best Actress	Nominated	
2011	Guzaarish	Best Actress	Nominated	
2017	Sarbjit	Best Actress	Nominated	

== Filmfare Awards South ==
The Filmfare Awards South are annual awards that honour artistic and technical excellence in the Telugu cinema, Tamil cinema, Malayalam cinema and Kannada cinema. They are presented by Filmfare magazine of The Times Group. When it was introduced in 1954, the Filmfare Awards initially only recognized achievements in the Hindi cinema.

Year	Film	Category	Result	Ref.
2023	Ponniyin Selvan: I	Filmfare Award for Best Actress – Tamil	Nominated	
2024	Ponniyin Selvan: II	Filmfare Award for Best Actress – Tamil	Nominated	

== Indian Film Festival of Melbourne ==
The Indian Film Festival of Melbourne (IFFM) is an annual Indian film festival based in Melbourne, Australia. It is presented by Film Victoria and the State Government of Victoria, and produced by Mind Blowing Films, a Melbourne-based distributor of Indian cinema across Australia and New Zealand. Founded in 2010, the festival was previously called Bollywood & Beyond, and from 2012 was re-established as an initiative of the Victorian Coalition Government Victorian Government that aims to strengthen ties between the Indian film industry and Victoria.

Year	Film	Category	Result	Ref.
2017	—N/a	Westpac IFFM Excellence in Global Cinema	Won	

== International Indian Film Academy Awards ==
The International Indian Film Academy Awards (also known as the IIFA Awards) are a set of awards presented annually by the International Indian Film Academy to honour both artistic and technical excellence of professionals in Bollywood, the Hindi language film industry. Instituted in 2000, the ceremony is held in different countries around the world every year. Rai has won 2 competitive awards out of 6 nominations; and has also won 4 non-competitive awards.

Year	Film	Category	Result	Ref.
2000	Hum Dil De Chuke Sanam	Best Actress	Won	
2003	Devdas	Best Actress	Won	
2005	—N/a	Global Indian Media Personality (Note: Presented by the city of Amsterdam)	Won	
2007	Dhoom 2	Best Actress	Nominated	
2007	—N/a	Most Glamorous Star of the Year	Won	
2008	Guru	Best Actress	Nominated	
2009	Jodhaa Akbar	Best Actress	Nominated	
2009	Hum Dil De Chuke Sanam & Devdas	Star of the Decade – Female	Won	
2009	—N/a	Outstanding Achievement In International Cinema	Won	
2011	Guzaarish	Best Actress	Nominated	

== IIFA Utsavam ==
The IIFA Utsavam rewards the artistic and technical achievements of the South Indian film industry. The ceremony is organised by Wizcraft International, the team behind the IIFA Awards.

Year	Film	Category	Result	Ref.
2024	Ponniyin Selvan: II	Best Actress – Tamil	Won	

== Producers Guild Film Awards ==
The Producers Guild Film Awards (previously known as the Apsara Film & Television Producers Guild Award) is an accolade given by the Apsara Producers Guild to recognize excellence in Indian film and television. Aishwarya Rai won 2 awards and 3 nominations.

Year	Film	Category	Result	Ref.
2008	Guru	Best Actress in a Leading Role	Nominated	
2009	Jodhaa Akbar	Best Actress in a Leading Role	Nominated	
2011	Guzaarish	Best Actress in a Leading Role	Nominated	
2011	Guzaarish	Cinematic Excellence – Female	Won	
2013	—N/a	Hindustan Times Outstanding Contribution to Society (along with Abhishek Bachchan)	Won	

== Screen Awards ==
The Screen Awards, is an annual awards ceremony held in India honouring professional excellence in the Bollywood Film Industry. The nomination and award selection is done by a panel of distinguished professionals from the industry.It was originally called the Screen Awards. Aishwarya Rai won 7 awards from 18 nominations.

Year	Film	Category	Result	Ref.
1998	Aur Pyaar Ho Gaya	Best Female Debut	Won	
2000	Hum Dil De Chuke Sanam	Best Actress	Won	
2000	Taal	Best Actress	Nominated	
2001	Hamara Dil Aapke Paas Hai	Best Actress	Nominated	
2003	Devdas	Best Actress	Won	
2003	Devdas	Jodi No. 1 (shared with Shah Rukh Khan)	Won	
2005	Raincoat	Best Actress	Nominated	
2007	Dhoom 2	Best Actress	Nominated	
2008	Guru	Best Actress	Nominated	
2009	Jodhaa Akbar	Best Actress	Nominated	
2009	Jodhaa Akbar	Best Actress (Popular Choice)	Won	
2011	Guzaarish	Jodi No. 1 (shared with Hrithik Roshan)	Won	
2011	Guzaarish	Best Actress	Nominated	
2017 (Note: Held on 4 December 2016.)	Ae Dil Hai Mushkil	Best Supporting Actress	Nominated	

== South Indian International Movie (SIIMA) Awards ==
South Indian International Movie Awards (also known as the SIIMA Awards) rewards the artistic and technical achievements of the South Indian film industry. It was launched in 2012 to appreciate and honour film makers from across the South Indian film industries.

Year	Film	Category	Result	Ref.
2024	Ponniyin Selvan: II	SIIMA Critics Award for Best Actress – Tamil	Won	

== Stardust Awards ==
The Stardust Awards is an award ceremony for Hindi movies, which is sponsored by Stardust magazine. The first ceremony was held in 2004 for films released in 2003. Aishwarya Rai won 4 awards and 9 nominations.

Year	Film	Category	Result	Ref.
2005	Raincoat	Actor of the Year – Female	Nominated	
2007	Dhoom 2	Actor of the Year – Female	Won	
2008	Guru	Actor of the Year – Female	Nominated	
2009	Jodhaa Akbar	Actor of the Year – Female	Nominated	
2009	Sarkar Raj	Actor of the Year – Female	Nominated	
2011	Guzaarish	Actor of the Year – Female	Nominated	
2011	Guzaarish	Best Actress in a Drama	Won	
2015	Jazbaa	Power–Packed Performance of the Year	Won	
2016	Ae Dil Hai Mushkil	Best Supporting Actress	Nominated	
2016	Sarbjit	Performer of the Year – Female	Won	

== Washington DC Area Film Critics Association Awards ==
The Washington DC Area Film Critics Association Awards (WAFCA) is a group of film critics based in Washington, D.C. and founded in 2002. WAFCA is composed of nearly 50 DC-based film critics from television, radio, print, and internet. Annually, the group gives awards to the best in film as selected by its members by vote.

Year	Film	Category	Result	Ref.
2005	Bride and Prejudice	Best Breakthrough Performance	Nominated	

== Zee Cine Awards ==
The Zee Cine Awards (ZCA) is an awards ceremony for the Hindi film industry. Aishwarya Rai won 6 awards and 10 nominations.

Year	Film	Category	Result	Ref.
2000	Hum Dil De Chuke Sanam and Taal	Lux Face of the Year	Won	
2000	Taal	Best Actor – Female	Nominated	
2000	Hum Dil De Chuke Sanam	Best Actor – Female	Won	
2001	Hamara Dil Aapke Paas Hai	Best Actor – Female	Nominated	
2003	Devdas	Best Actor – Female	Won	
2003	—N/a	True Indian Beauty Award	Won	
2005	Raincoat	Best Actor (Critics) – Female	Won	
2007	Umrao Jaan	Best Actor – Female	Nominated	
2008	Guru	Best Actor – Female	Nominated	
2011	Guzaarish	Best Actor – Female	Nominated	
2011	Guzaarish	Best Actor (Critics) – Female	Won	
2011	—N/a	International Female Icon	Nominated	

== International Film Festival and Awards of Australia ==
Winner

- 2017 – Best Actress – Sarbjit

== Sansui Awards ==
Winner

- 2003 – Best Actress – Devdas

== Filmfare Glamour & Style Awards ==
Winner

- 2014 – Global Icon of the Year (Female)
- 2014 – Most Glamorous Real-Life Couple (Aishwarya Rai Bachchan & Abhishek Bachchan)
- 2015 – Global Icon of the Year (Female)
- 2015 – Most Glamorous Real-Life Couple (Aishwarya Rai Bachchan & Abhishek Bachchan)
- 2016 – Most Glamorous Star (Female)
- 2016 – Trendsetter Of The Year

== HT Most Stylish Awards ==
Winner

- 2015 – Most Stylish Couple of the Year (Aishwarya Rai Bachchan & Abhishek Bachchan)
- 2015 – Most Stylish Global Icon of the Year (Female)
- 2016 – Most Stylish Female Superstar
- 2016 – Most Stylish Couple (Aishwarya Rai Bachchan & Abhishek Bachchan)
- 2018 – Timeless Style Diva

== Vogue Beauty Awards ==
Winner

- 2011 – Vogue Beauty Awards – Global Beauty Icon award.
- 2017 – Vogue Beauty Awards – Most Beautiful Global Indian Icon of the Decade
- 2017 – Vogue Women Of The Year Awards – Vogue Influencer of the Decade'

== HELLO! Hall of Fame Awards ==
Winner

- 2010 – HELLO! Hall of Fame Awards – Global Icon Award.
- 2016 – HELLO! Hall of Fame Awards – Glamour Icon of the Year
- 2019 – HELLO! Hall of Fame Awards – 25 Years Of Excellence In Cinema

== GQ Men of the Year Awards ==
Winner

- 2010 – GQ Men of the Year Awards – "Global Indian Woman"
- 2010 – GQ Men of the Year Awards – Excellence Award.

== NDTV Indian of the Year Awards ==
Winner

- 2010 – NDTV Indian of the Year Awards – Icon of 21 years of Entertainment Award
- 2010 – NDTV Indian of the Year Awards – Indian Icon of the Year.

== Femina Beauty Awards ==
Winner

- 2012 – L’Oréal Paris Femina Women Awards – The Iconic Woman of Worth Award
- 2018 – Femina Beauty Awards – Global Beauty Icon
- 2018 – Femina Beauty Awards – Powerhouse Entertainer for Two Decades

== Cosmopolitan Awards ==
Winner

- 2011 – Cosmopolitan Awards – Female of All Time
- 2012 – Cosmopolitan Fun, Fearless Awards – Power Couple (Aishwarya Rai Bachchan & Abhishek Bachchan)

== Other awards ==
Winner

- 2000 – Screen Videocon Award for Best Actress – Hum Dil De Chuke Sanam
- 2000 – Priyadarshini International Award for Best Actress – Hum Dil De Chuke Sanam
- 2000 – Rupa Filmgoers Millennium Award for Best Actress – Hum Dil De Chuke Sanam
- 2000 – Stardust Millenium Award for Best Actress – Hum Dil De Chuke Sanam
- 2001 – BWSX Fantasy Award Best Supporting Actress – Mohabbatein
- 2002 – RACE Award Best Actress – Devdas
- 2004 – F Awards - For Excellence in Indian Fashion – Female Celebrity Model of the Year
- 2005 – MTV Immies – Best Performance in a Song ("Kajra Re" from Bunty Aur Babli)
- 2006 – Zee Astitva Awards – Outstanding Contribution to Cinema
- 2007 – MTV Lycra Style Awards – Most Stylish Female for Dhoom 2
- 2007 – MTV Lycra Style Awards – Most Stylish Couple (along with Hrithik Roshan for Dhoom 2)
- 2008 – Central European Bollywood Award for Best Actress – Guru
- 2008 – Reebok Zoom Glam Awards – Glam Couple Award (along with Abhishek Bachchan)
- 2009 – Indian Youth Icon Awards – Global Face of the Year
- 2010 – Masala Awards – Global Artist Of The Year
- 2010 – DNA India Style Awards – Beauty Icon Award
- 2011 – Big Ima Music Awards – The Best Visualized Female Song – "Udi" (Guzaarish)
- 2017 – Lions Gold Award for Best Actress of the Year for Sarbjit

== Media honours and recognitions ==
- 2006 – Ranked 1st in BollySpice.com Magazine's list of "Top 10 Actresses of 2006".
- 2009 – A poll conducted by the newspaper Daily News and Analysis, she was voted as one of India's most popular icons.
- 2010 – Ranked 2nd in The Times of India's "50 most desirable women"
- 2011 – Ranked 9th in The Times of India's "50 most desirable women".
- 2012 – Voted as the best-dressed celebrity on the red carpet in an online survey conducted by Yahoo! India.
- 2012 – On Mother's Day 2012, Rai Voted as "Ideal Celebrity Mother in Bollywood" by Shaadi.com.
- 2013 – The Best of Filmfare – Iconic women who shaped our movie dreams.
- 2014 – Most searched "Successful Indian Woman" on Google.
- 2015 – Voted as "The Most Yummiest Mummy" with 72% votes as Yummiest mummy in Bollywood.
- 2015 – Voted as "Best Dressed" at Cannes 2015 with 50.53% votes.
- 2016 – "Most Successful Woman Achiever" in business/entrepreneur by Outlook Business Magazine.
- 2017 – Filmfare "Most Powerful Girl of Showbiz" in Bollywood.
- 2019 – 2019 Cannes Film Festival Best Dressed Readers' Choice
- 2019 – Ranked sixth India Most Trusted Personality List 2019 by TRA Research in TRA Actor (Female) category
- 2020 – Ranked thirteenth in the overall list Actor category of India Most Trusted Personality List TRA.
