= List of awards and nominations received by Shankar–Ehsaan–Loy =

List of Shankar–Ehsaan–Loy awards and nominations
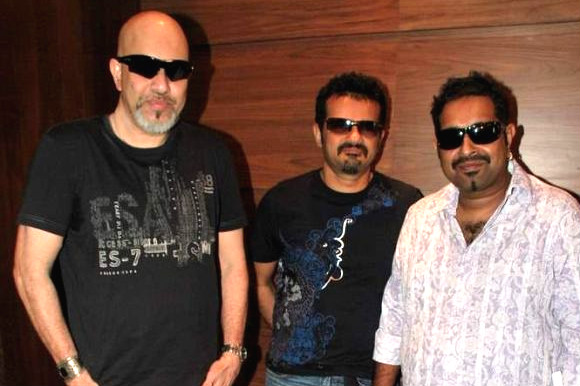
- Loy, Ehsaan and Shankar
Award	Wins	Nominations
National Film Award	1	0
Filmfare Awards	5	11
Filmfare Awards South		1
IIFA Award	3	10
Star Screen Awards	3	11
	1	7
MTV Immies	2	2
Bollywood Movie Award	3	3
Mirchi Music Awards	5	12
Mirchi Music Awards Telugu	2	2
Global Indian Music Awards	1	1
Sangeet Awards	2	2
V. Shantaram Awards		2
Apsara Awards	2	4
- Totals
Awards won	30
Nominations	68

This article details the awards and nominations awarded to Indian film composer trio Shankar–Ehsaan–Loy.

== Awards ==
=== Honorary Awards ===
- 2004 – Teacher's Achievement Award
- 2011 – The Jack Daniel's Years of Excellence Award
- 2011 – NDTV Indian of the Year

=== National Film Awards ===
- 2004 – Best Music Director – Kal Ho Naa Ho

==== Filmfare Awards ====
- 2002 – R. D. Burman Award for New Music Talent – Dil Chahta Hai
- 2004 – Best Music Director – Kal Ho Naa Ho
- 2006 – Best Music Director – Bunty Aur Babli
- 2015 – Best Music Director – 2 States

==== Filmfare Awards (Marathi) ====
- 2016 – Best Music Director (Marathi) – Katyar Kaljat Ghusali

==== International Indian Film Academy Awards (IIFA) ====
- 2004 – Best Music Director – Kal Ho Naa Ho
- 2006 – Best Music Director – Bunty Aur Babli
- 2011 – Best Background Score – My Name is Khan
- 2015 – Best Music Director – 2 States

==== Bollywood Movie Awards ====
- 2004 – Best Music Director – Kal Ho Naa Ho
- 2006 – Best Music Director – Bunty Aur Babli
- 2007 – Best Music Director – Kabhi Alvida Naa Kehna

==== Maharashtra State Film Awards ====
- 2015 - Best Music Director – Katyar Kaljat Ghusali

==== Sangeet Awards ====
- 2004 – Best Music Director – Kal Ho Naa Ho
- 2004 – Best Song – "Kal Ho Naa Ho" from Kal Ho Naa Ho

==== Screen-Videocon Awards / Star Screen Awards ====
- 2002 – Best Music Director – Dil Chahta Hai
- 2006 – Best Music Director – Bunty Aur Babli
- 2011 – Best Music Director – My Name Is Khan
- 2014 – Best Background Score – Bhaag Milkha Bhaag

==== Apsara Film & Television Producers Guild Awards ====
- 2004 – Best Music Director – Kal Ho Naa Ho
- 2006 – Best Music Director – Bunty Aur Babli

==== Zee Cine Awards ====
- 2006 – Best Music Director – Bunty Aur Babli

==== Global Indian Music Awards ====
- 2011 – Best Background Score – My Name Is Khan
- 2014 – Best Background Score – Bhaag Milkha Bhaag

==== Mirchi Music Awards ====
- 2011 – Best Programmer and Arranger – My Name Is Khan
- 2011 – Best Song in Sufi Tradition – "Sajda" – My Name Is Khan
- 2015 – Album of The Year – 2 States
- 2015 – Music Composer of The Year – "Mast Magan" from 2 States
- 2017 – Best Song Producer (Programming & Arranging) – "Kaaga" from Mirzya

==== Mirchi Music Awards (Telugu) ====
- 2010 – Mirchi Music Awards (Telugu) Critics Awards (Album) – Konchem Ishtam Konchem Kashtam
- 2010 – Mirchi Music Awards (Telugu) Critics Awards (Song) – "Anandama" from Konchem Ishtam Konchem Kashtam

=== International ===
==== MTV Immies ====
- 2004 – Best Album (Film Category) – Kal Ho Naa Ho
- 2006 – Best Album (Film Category) – Bunty Aur Babli

== Nominations ==
=== Filmfare Awards ===
- 2002 – Best Music Director – Dil Chahta Hai
- 2007 – Best Music Director – Don: The Chase Begins Again
- 2007 – Best Music Director – Kabhi Alvida Naa Kehna
- 2009 – Best Music Director – Rock On!!
- 2010 – Best Music Director – Wake Up Sid
- 2011 – Best Music Director – My Name Is Khan
- 2012 – Best Music Director – Zindagi Na Milegi Dobara
- 2016 – Best Music Director – Dil Dhadakne Do
- 2017 – Best Music Director – Mirzya
- 2019 – Best Music Director – Raazi
- 2021 – Best Music Director – Chhapaak

=== Filmfare Awards South ===
- 2010 – Best Music Director (Telugu) – Konchem Ishtam Konchem Kashtam

=== International Indian Film Academy Awards ===
- 2001 – Best Music Director – Mission Kashmir
- 2002 – Best Music Director – Dil Chahta Hai
- 2007 – Best Music Director – Kabhi Alvida Naa Kehna
- 2009 – Best Music Director – Rock On!!
- 2009 – Music Director of the Decade – Kal Ho Naa Ho, Bunty Aur Babli
- 2011 – Best Music Director – Housefull, Karthik Calling Karthik

=== Screen-Videocon Awards / Screen Awards ===
- 2001 – Best Background Score – Mission Kashmir
- 2002 – Best Background Score – Dil Chahta Hai
- 2004 – Best Background Score – Kal Ho Naa Ho
- 2007 – Best Music Director – Kabhi Alvida Naa Kehna
- 2008 – Best Music Director – Taare Zameen Par
- 2008 – Best Background Score – Taare Zameen Par
- 2009 – Best Music Director – Rock On!!
- 2009 – Best Background Score – Rock On!!

=== Zee Cine Awards ===
- 2002 – Best Music Director – Dil Chahta Hai
- 2004 – Best Music Director – Kal Ho Naa Ho
- 2006 – Best Music Director – Bunty Aur Babli
- 2007 – Best Music Director – Kabhi Alvida Naa Kehna
- 2011 – Best Music Director – Housefull, Karthik Calling Karthik

=== Mirchi Music Awards ===
- 2011 – Album of the Year – My Name Is Khan
- 2011 – Music Director of the Year – My Name Is Khan
- 2011 – Background Score of the Year – My Name Is Khan
- 2012 – Album of The Year – Zindagi Na Milegi Dobara
- 2012 – Music Composer of The Year – "Senorita" from Zindagi Na Milegi Dobara
- 2016 – Album of The Year – Dil Dhadakne Do
- 2016 – Background Score of the Year – Dil Dhadakne Do
- 2017 – Best Song Producer (Programming & Arranging) – "Mirzya" from Mirzya

=== V. Shantaram Awards ===
- 2008 – Best Music Director – Taare Zameen Par, Rock On!!

=== Apsara Film & Television Producers Guild Awards ===
- 2008 – Best Music Director – Taare Zameen Par, Rock On!!
- 2011 – Best Music Director – My Name Is Khan

== Longlisted ==
This section refers to awards where SEL has been considered for a nomination but has not been nominated.

- Academy Awards
  - 2013 – Best Original Song – "Delhi Safari" – Delhi Safari
