= List of MTV award shows =

MTV, the first and most popular music television network in the U.S. has a long history of hosting live music events in which awards are presented. Along with MTV's related channels around the world, the network produces over 20 award shows annually. This list of MTV award shows links to further information about each of these shows.

== MTV award shows in the United States ==
- CMT Music Awards (1967–2024*)
  - Acquired by MTV Networks in May 2000. Originally known as the Music City News Awards when founded in 1967.
- MTV Video Music Award (1984–present)
- BET Soul Train Awards (1987–2007, 2009–present)
  - Acquired by Paramount Global in 2016.
- MTV Movie & TV Awards (1992–2023)
- MTVU Woodie Awards (2004–2017)
- MTV Fandom Awards (2014–2017)

== MTV award shows around the world ==
=== Current shows ===
- MTV Video Music Awards Japan

=== Previous awards shows ===
- MTV Video Music Brazil
- Los Premios MTV Latinoamérica
- MTV Africa Music Awards
- MTV Asia Awards
- MTV Australia Awards
- MTV Europe Music Awards
- MTV Italian Music Awards
- MTV Immies (and its related Gimmies)
- MTV Israel Music Awards
- MTV Mandarin Music Awards
- MTV Mandarin Music Honors
- MTV MIAW Awards
- MTV MIAW Awards Brazil
- MTV Pakistan Music Video Awards
- Penghargaan MTV Indonesia
- MTV Pilipinas Music Award
- MTV Romania Music Awards
- MTV Russia Music Awards
- MTV Student Voice Awards (Japan)
- TMF Awards

=== Movies ===
- MTV Movie Awards Mexico
- MTV Asia Movie Awards
- MTV Indonesia Movie Awards
- MTV Russia Movie Awards

=== Fashion ===
- MTV India Style Awards
- MTV China Style Awards
- MTV Philippines Style Awards
- Fashionista MTV (Latin America)

=== Video games ===
- MTV Game Awards (Germany)
- MTV Game Awards (Mexico)
