= MTV Immies =

Annual Indian music award ceremony

- Awarded for: Best in music
- Country: India
- Presented by: MTV India
- First award: 2003

The MTV Immies are held every year with an aim to award the best talents in the Indian music industry. In 2005, the Immies supported relief for the quake victims of India and Pakistan. Also, proceeds from donor passes were given to the Prime Minister's Relief Fund. In keeping with tradition, a number of Pakistani as well as international artists performed at the event. In December 2004, seven time Grammy winner Canadian singer Alanis Morissette attended the event.

== Award winners ==
=== 2003 ===
FILM CATEGORY WINNERS

- Best Performance in a song - Male: Shahrukh Khan - Chalte Chalte
- Best Performance in a song - Female: Yana Gupta - Dum
- Best Composer: A. R. Rahman - Saathiya
- Best Lyrics: Gulzar - Saathiya
- Best Singer - Male: Sonu Nigam - Saathiya
- Best Singer - Female: Chitra - Koi... Mil Gaya
- Best Album: Kal Ho Naa Ho - Karan Johar / Yash Johar
- Best Choreography: Farah Khan - Koi... Mil Gaya
- Best New Film Music Talent - Male / Female: Sonu Kakkar - Dum

POP CATEGORY

- Best Male Pop Act - Solo / Duo / Group: Adnan Sami - Tera Chehra
- Best Female Pop Act - Solo / Duo / Group: Falguni Pathak - Yeh Kya Jadoo Kiya
- Best Pop Album: Tera Chehra
- Best Video: Bela Segal - Tera Chehra
- Best New Non-film Talent - Male / Female: Babul Supriyo - Soochta Hun
- Best Remix Video / Song: Kaanta Laga - Harry Anand / Rao & Sapru Films

INTERNATIONAL CATEGORY

- Best Male Pop Act - Solo / Duo / Group: Westlife
- Best Female Pop Act - Solo / Duo / Group: Norah Jones
- Best Debut: Norah Jones

SPECIAL CATEGORY

- Inspiration / Special Award: Lata Mangeshkar

JURY CATEGORY

- Best Ghazal Album: Pankaj Udhas - Yaaron Mujhe
- Best Devotional / Spiritual Album: Jagjit Singh - Hari Om Tat Sat
- Best Classical / Classical Fusion Album - Vocal: Bhimsen Joshi - Tum Kaheko Neha Lagaye
- Best Classical / Classical Fusion Album - Instrumental: Rahul Sharma - Psychadelia
- Best Detection IMI Team for the Year 2003: Ram Kripal Singh - DSP (Retd) and Bindeshwari Singh - Sr. Inspector (Retd)

=== 2004 ===
FILM CATEGORY:

- Best New Film Music Talent: Kunal Ganjawala (Bheege Honth)
- Best Lyrics: Arun Bhairav (Lal Dupatta)
- Best Singer Male (Film): Sonu Nigam (Main Hoon Na)
- Best Singer Female (Film): Sunidhi Chauhan (Dekh Le)
- Best Performance in a Song Male (Film): Hrithik Roshan (Main Aisa Kyon Hoon)
- Best Performance in a Song Female (Film): Sushmita Sen (Tumhe Joh Maine Dekha)
- Best Film Album: Main Hoon Na
- Best Choreographer: Prabhudeva (Main Aisa Kyoh Hoon)
- Best Composer: Pritam (Dhoom Machale)

POP CATEGORY:

- Best Female Pop: Sneha Pant (Kabhi Aar Kabhi Paar)
- Best Male Pop Singer: Bombay Vikings (Chhod Do Aanchal)
- Best Pop Album: Harry Anand (Sweet Honey Mix)
- Best Music Video: Raj Santhkumar & Shruti Vohra (Chhod Do Aanchal)
- Best International Pop Debut: The Black Eyed Peas
- Best Remix Video Song: DJ Suketu (Bin Tere Sanam)
- Best New Non Film Talent: Josh (Kabhi)
- Best Ghazal Album: Jagjit Singh (Close To My Heart)
- Best Female International: Tata Young
- Best Male Pop Act International: Enrique Iglesias

JURY AWARDS:

- Best Classical Fusion Instrumental: Niladri Kumar
- Best Classical Vocal: Parveen Sultana
- Staying Alive Award: Shailendra Singh of Percept D'Mark
- Inspiration Award: Naushad
- Best Devotional / Spiritual Album: Pandit Jasraj

=== 2005 ===
FILM CATEGORY WINNERS

- Best Performance In A Song - Male: Abhishek Bachchan & Zayed Khan - Dus Bahane
- Best Performance In A Song - Female: Aishwarya Rai - Kajra Re
- Best Male Singer: Kunal Ganjawala - Salaam Namaste
- Best Female Singer: Alisha Chinai - Kajra Re
- Best Film Album: Bunty Aur Babli - Yash Raj Films Pvt. Ltd
- Best Composer: Himesh Reshammiya - Aashiq Banaya Aapne
- Best Lyricist: Sayeed Quadri - Woh Lamhe
- Best Choreographer: Farah Khan - Just Chill
- Best New Film Music Talent: Himesh Reshammiya - Aashiq Banaya Aapne

INDIPOP CATEGORY WINNERS

- Best Male Pop Act: Yo Yo Honey Singh & Ashok Mastie - Glassy
- Best Female Pop Act: Asha Bhosle - Aaj Jaane Ki Zid Na Karo
- Best Pop Album: Sonu Nigam - Chanda Ki Doli
- Best Remix Video Song: Dj Suketu/Ahmed Khan - Kya Khoob Lagti Ho
- Best New Non Film Talent: Yo Yo Honey Singh - Glassy
- Best Video: Anand Surapur (Rabbi - Bulla Ki Jaana)
- Best Ghazal Album: Jagjit Singh’s - Raat Khamosh Hai
- Best Classical Instrumental Album: Amjad Ali Khan & Bismillah Khan
- Best Devotional Album: Pundit Jasraj
- Best Classical Vocal Album: Kishori Amonkar
- Best Fusion Album: Medieval Pundits

INTERNATIONAL CATEGORY:

- Best International Debut: Gwen Stefani
- Best International Male Pop Act: U2
- Best International Female Pop Act: Mariah Carey

INSPIRATION AWARD: Yash Raj Chopra

=== 2006 ===
- Best Performance In A Song - Female: Bipasha Basu - Beedi

== See also ==
- MTV India
- MTV Asia
- MTV Networks Asia
- MTV Award Shows
