= Aishwarya Rai =

Indian actress (born 1973)

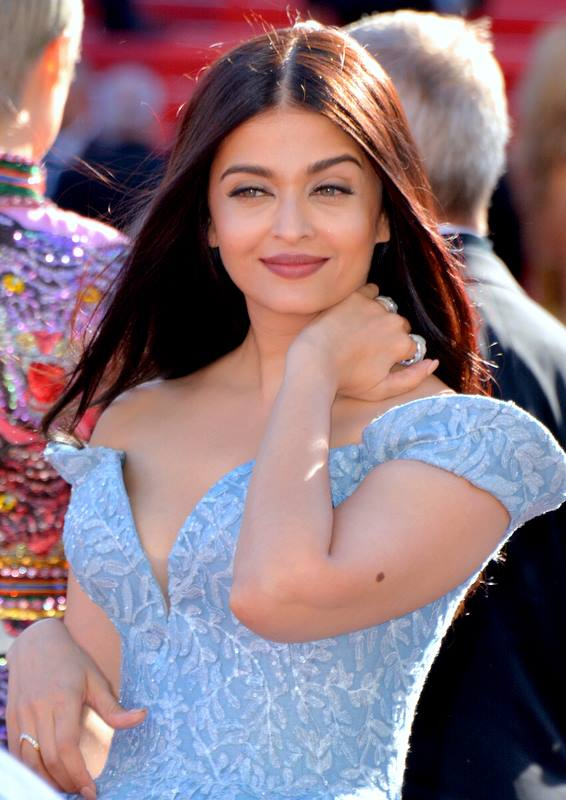
- Rai in 2017
- Born: 1 November 1973 (age 53); Mangalore, Karnataka, India
- Education: University of Mumbai
- Occupation: Actress
- Years active: 1991–present
- Works: Full list
- Title: Femina Miss India 1994 1st runner up Miss World 1994
- Predecessor: Lisa Hanna
- Successor: Jacqueline Aguilera
- Spouse: Abhishek Bachchan (m. 2007)
- Children: 1
- Family: Bachchan family (by marriage)
- Awards: Full list
- Honours: Padma Shri (2009); Order of Arts and Letters (2012)

Aishwarya Rai Bachchan (Hindi pronunciation: [ɛːʃʋəɾjᵊ ɾɑːj ˈbətːʃən]; née Rai; born 1 November 1973) is an Indian actress who is primarily known for her work in Hindi and Tamil films. Rai won the Miss World 1994 pageant and later established herself as one of the most-popular and influential celebrities in India. She has received numerous accolades for her acting, including two Filmfare Awards. In 2004, Time magazine named her one of the 100 most influential people in the world. In 2009, the Government of India honoured her with the Padma Shri and in 2012, the Government of France awarded her with the Order of Arts and Letters. From the late 1990s to 2010s, media often called her "the most beautiful woman in the world". She is the second Indian woman to win the Miss World title after Reita Faria in 1966.

While in college, Rai modelled and appeared in several television commercials, and entered the Miss India pageant, in which she was placed second. She was then crowned Miss World 1994, made her acting debut in Mani Ratnam's 1997 Tamil film Iruvar and had her Hindi film debut in Aur Pyaar Ho Gaya that year. Her first commercial success was the Tamil romantic drama Jeans (1998), which at the time was the most expensive Indian film. She achieved wider success and won two Filmfare Awards for Best Actress for her performances in Sanjay Leela Bhansali's romantic dramas Hum Dil De Chuke Sanam (1999) and Devdas (2002).

Rai garnered critical appreciation for portraying a passionate artist in Kandukondain Kandukondain (2000), a seductive widow in Chokher Bali (2003), an unhappily married woman in Raincoat (2004), Kiranjit Ahluwalia in Provoked (2006), and a nurse in Bhansali's Guzaarish (2010). Her greatest commercial successes have been the romantic dramas Mohabbatein (2000) and Ae Dil Hai Mushkil (2016), the adventure film Dhoom 2 (2006), the biographical drama Guru (2007), the science-fiction film Enthiran (2010), and the period films Jodhaa Akbar (2008), Ponniyin Selvan: I (2022) and Ponniyin Selvan: II (2023).

Rai's off-screen roles include being an ambassador for several charity organisations and supporting philanthropic causes through her namesake foundation. She was appointed a Goodwill Ambassador for the Joint United Nations Programme on HIV/AIDS (UNAIDS) in 2012. She has also participated in stage shows and is an investor and prominent brand endorser. In 2003, she was the first Indian actress to be a juror at the Cannes Film Festival. She married the actor Abhishek Bachchan in 2007, with whom she has a daughter.

== Early life and education ==
Aishwarya was born on 1 November 1973 into a Tulu Hindu family in Mangalore, Karnataka. Her father Krishnaraj Rai, who died on 18 March 2017, was a marine biologist and her mother Vrinda is a housewife. She has one elder brother Aditya Rai, an engineer in the merchant navy. Rai's movie Dil Ka Rishta (2003) was co-produced by her brother and co-written by her mother. She has been fluent in Tulu, Hindi and English since childhood, and has also stated that she speaks Marathi and Tamil.

Rai's family later moved to Mumbai due to her father's job transfer. There, she attended the Arya Vidya Mandir High School. She had her intermediate schooling at Jai Hind College for a year and then enrolled at D. G. Ruparel College in Matunga, securing 90 percent in the Higher Secondary (School) Certificate (HSC) exams. Describing her desire to maintain a good academic standing, she said: "I've always got a first rank except for my seventh grade mid-term when I stood second. When I came to the 10th grade, my seniors, my juniors, everybody thought I'd top the ICSE board exams. But I came seventh or eighth in class and that was a huge ego blow."

Rai trained in classical dance and music for five years during her teens and showed interest in traditional dance forms, including Bharatanatyam. Her favourite subject was zoology and she initially considered a career in medicine. Planning to become an architect, she enrolled at Rachana Sansad Academy of Architecture, but later gave up her education to pursue a career in modelling. Rai had appeared as a child model for Camlin pencils and later, photographs of her taken by her English professor for a project went viral, and photographers Gautam Rajadhyaksha and Farrokh Chothia contacted her to appear in advertisements.

== Modelling career ==
In 1991, Rai participated in an international supermodel contest, which led to her being featured in the American edition of Vogue magazine. In 1993, she gained wide public recognition for her appearance in a Pepsi commercial with actors Aamir Khan and Mahima Chaudhry. Her single line of dialogue "Hi, I'm Sanjana" became popular.

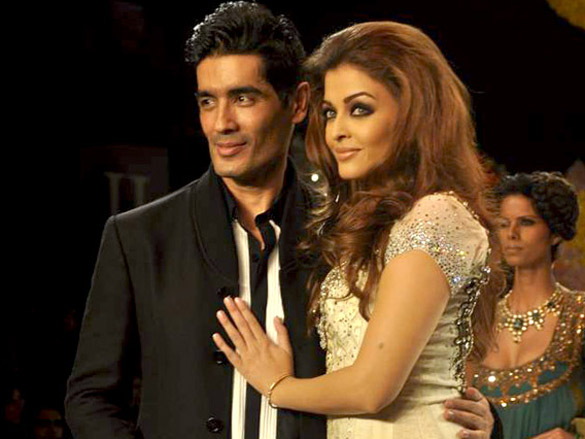
With fashion designer Manish Malhotra on the runway at HDIL India Couture Week in 2010

In the 1994 Miss India pageant, Rai won second place behind Sushmita Sen and was crowned Miss India World, also winning the titles Miss Catwalk, Miss Miraculous, Miss Photogenic, Miss Perfect Ten and Miss Popular.

As first runner-up, Rai's duties included representing India in the rival Miss World pageant in Sun City, South Africa. She went on to win the pageant, and the Miss Photogenic award and Miss World Continental Queen of Beauty − Asia and Oceania. After winning Miss World, Rai said she dreamt of world peace and that she wanted to be an ambassador of peace during her one-year reign in London.

In 1995, Aishwarya Rai went on a world tour, including to Colombo and Sri Lanka, in her capacity as ambassador of peace during her reign as Miss world, representing the organisation for their "beauty with a purpose" initiative.

Prior to participating in beauty pageants, she had received four offers to star in movies but she decided to participate in Miss India to step back from the film industry for a bit. She said in an interview, "If I hadn't taken part in Miss India, Raja Hindustani (1996) would have been my first film." She continued to model until she became an actress.

== Acting career ==
=== Debut and breakthrough (1997–1999) ===
Rai made her acting debut in 1997 with Mani Ratnam's Tamil film Iruvar, a semi-biographical political drama co-starring Mohanlal, Prakash Raj, Tabu and Revathi. The film was a critical success, and won the Best Film award at the Belgrade International Film Festival among other awards. Rai starred as Pushpavalli and Kalpana, the latter of which is a fictionalised portrayal of politician and former actress Jayalalithaa. Her dialogue in the film was dubbed by Tamil actress Rohini. In the same year, Rai was cast as a young woman in an arranged marriage set-up, Ashi, opposite Bobby Deol in her first Bollywood film Aur Pyaar Ho Gaya, a romantic comedy. Aur Pyaar Ho Gaya was a commercial failure and reviewers were critical of her acting ability. For her role, she won a Screen Award for Best Female Debut.

In the 1998 big-budget Tamil romantic drama Jeans, which S. Shankar directed, Rai appeared alongside Prashanth as Madhumita, a young woman who accompanies her ailing grandmother to the United States to seek medical attention. The film was a commercial success, and earned her praise for her acting and dancing skills. In this film, her dialogue was dubbed by Savitha Reddy. Jeans, which was the most expensive Indian film at the time, was submitted as India's official entry to the Academy Awards for 1998 but was not nominated.

Rai's first role of 1999 was in the melodrama Aa Ab Laut Chalen, which Rishi Kapoor directed. The film was a critical failure and had a below-average performance at the box office. Her portrayal of Pooja Walia, a traditional Indian woman living in the United States, met with negative reviews; Rediff.com said: "Rai sports a plastic smile and never gets a scene where she can portray any depth. All she does is cry and smile and look pretty." Also in 1999, Rai starred in the romantic musical Hum Dil De Chuke Sanam, which became a significant turning point in her career. The film is an adaptation of Maitreyi Devi's Bengali novel Na Hanyate; it was directed by Sanjay Leela Bhansali, and co-starred Salman Khan and Ajay Devgn. Rai played Nandini, a Gujarati woman who is forced into wedlock with Devgn's character, despite being in love with another man (played by Khan). Bhansali cast Rai after meeting her at a film screening and was impressed with her eyes. Khalid Mohamed of Bombay Talkies wrote that she has "an unquestionable felicity for acting", and has "that impossible combination of breathtaking beauty and brains". Hum Dil De Chuke Sanam was a commercial success and won Rai a Filmfare Award for Best Actress.

Rai next took up the leading role of Mansi, a naive young woman with an exceptional singing talent, in Subhash Ghai's musical Taal alongside Akshay Khanna and Anil Kapoor. A reviewer from Rediff.com praised her acting and dancing in the film, and wrote: "Taal will again enhance her reputation as an actress while in no way detracting from her image as a traffic-stopper". Taal was a commercial success and is notable for being the first Indian film to appear in the top-20 listing at the American box office. Rai received a second Best Actress nomination that year at the Filmfare Awards ceremony.

=== Established actress and success (2000–2008) ===
In 2000, Rai starred in Kandukondain Kandukondain, a Tamil-language adaptation of Jane Austen's novel Sense and Sensibility. Rajiv Menon directed the film, which also stars Mammooty, Tabu and Ajith Kumar. She was cast as Meenakshi, who is based on Marianne Dashwood, the younger sister of Tabu's character. The film was a critical and commercial success, and earned Rai positive comments from critics; a review carried by The Indian Express said: "Attacking her role with just the perfect dollop of innocence, Rai does full justice to her part, and matches up perfectly to Tabu".

Rai next starred alongside Shah Rukh Khan and Chandrachur Singh in the action drama Josh. She portrayed Shirley Dias, the twin sister of Khan's character who falls in love with his arch enemy's brother (played by Singh). The casting of Rai as Khan's sister was considered an unusual pairing at the time but director Mansoor Khan described it as "perfect". Critics gave Josh mixed reviews and it was a commercial success. In Satish Kaushik's social drama Hamara Dil Aapke Paas Hai, Rai played a rape victim. The film co-stars Anil Kapoor and Sonali Bendre, and was well-received by critics and did well at the box office. Sukanya Verma praised Rai's decision to star in the film and said she "conveys the turmoil and pain of a rape victim well. But it is her transition from an emotional wreck trying to gather the broken pieces of her life back together, that is amazing." Her performance in the film earned her a third Best Actress nomination at Filmfare.

Following a leading role in the box-office failure Dhai Akshar Prem Ke, Rai played a supporting role in Aditya Chopra's musical romantic drama Mohabbatein. She played Megha Shankar, the daughter of Amitabh Bachchan's character, who commits suicide after realizing her father will not accept her romance with one of his students (played by Shah Rukh Khan). Mohabbatein received positive reviews from critics, became the highest-grossing film of the year and earned Rai a nomination for the Filmfare Award for Best Supporting Actress. The following year, she starred alongside Govinda and Jackie Shroff in the romantic comedy Albela, which together with her performance, received mostly negative reviews; Taran Adarsh of Bollywood Hungama criticised the film and said Rai is "plastic in some scenes".

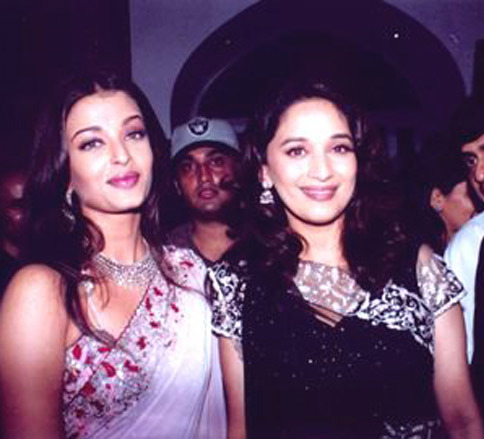
With her co-star Madhuri Dixit at the premiere of their film Devdas in 2002

After featuring in David Dhawan's slapstick comedy film Hum Kisise Kum Nahin, Rai appeared alongside Shah Rukh Khan and Madhuri Dixit in Sanjay Leela Bhansali's period romantic drama Devdas, an adaptation of Sharat Chandra Chattopadhyay's novel of the same name. Rai played the role of Paro (Parvati), the love interest of the protagonist (Khan). The film was screened at the 2002 Cannes Film Festival and it was featured by Time in its listing of the "10 Best Films of the Millennium". Devdas was a major international success with a revenue of over ₹840 million (US$9.0 million). Alan Morrison, writing for Empire, praised the performances of the three leads and wrote: "Rai proves she has the acting talent to back up her flawless looks". Devdas was chosen as India's official entry for the Academy Award for Best Foreign Language Film and received a nomination at the BAFTA Awards in the Best Foreign Language Film category. In India, the film won 10 Filmfare Awards, including a second Best Actress award for Rai. Also in 2002, she participated in the UK television show From India with Love along with Amitabh Bachchan, Aamir Khan, Shah Rukh Khan and Preity Zinta. The show took place at Manchester's Old Trafford and London's Hyde Park, with over 100,000 spectators.

In 2003, Rai starred in two romantic dramas—her brother's production début Dil Ka Rishta alongside Arjun Rampal and Rohan Sippy's Kuch Naa Kaho alongside Abhishek Bachchan. Neither of these films fared well critically or commercially. She was later noted for her starring role in Rituparno Ghosh's independent Bengali film Chokher Bali, an adaptation of Rabindranath Tagore's eponymous novel. Rai portrayed Binodini, an emotionally manipulative widow who is struggling with her sexual desires in early-20th century Bengal. The film was a major critical success and Rai earned praise for her performance; Derek Elley of Variety noted: "Rai dominates the film with her delicately sensual presence and physical grace". Commercially, the film was a sleeper hit.

After the success of Chokher Bali, Rai returned to mainstream Hindi film in Rajkumar Santoshi's Khakee (2004), an action thriller featuring Amitabh Bachchan, Akshay Kumar, Ajay Devgn and Tusshar Kapoor. The film tells the story of five constables involved in a mystery surrounding a terrorist attack; Rai played Mahalakshmi, a gun moll. While filming for Khakee, she was accidentally hit by a running car that caused a fracture in her left foot. Upon release, the film was a moderate critical and commercial success. In her next release, the romantic comedy Kyun! Ho Gaya Na..., Rai played Diya Malhotra, a university student who develops a one-sided attraction toward her friend Arjun Khanna (played by Vivek Oberoi). The film received mixed-to-positive reviews from critics but was commercially unsuccessful.

In 2004, Rai garnered international recognition for her starring role opposite Martin Henderson in Gurinder Chadha's British film Bride and Prejudice, a Bollywood-style adaptation of Jane Austen's novel Pride and Prejudice. International film critics expressed mixed views on Rai's performance as the Punjabi version of Elizabeth Bennet; a review carried by The New York Times called her "radiantly beautiful but inert" while Rolling Stone noted "she is a world-class hottie with talent to match, as she proves in her first English-speaking role". With a worldwide gross of $24 million against a production budget of $7 million, Bride and Prejudice was a commercial success. Rai next collaborated with director Rituparno Ghosh for the second time on the 2004 relationship drama Raincoat, an adaptation of O. Henry's The Gift of the Magi, which won the National Film Award for Best Feature Film in Hindi. Critics praised the film and noted the lack of glamour in Rai's role, which earned her a Best Actress nomination at Filmfare. Derek Elley of Variety called Raincoat a "chamber-sized gem" and said Rai had shunned "her usual immaculate makeup and duds, and looking more like a broken, malfunctioning doll". Gautaman Bhaskaran of The Hindu said Rai "looks quite plain [and] seems to have made an earnest effort to emote, using less of her body and limbs and more of her face, and eyes in particular".

Rai next co-starred alongside Sanjay Dutt and Zayed Khan in the 2005 adult drama Shabd, which tells the story of an author who as research for his next book, persuades his wife to pursue a relationship with a younger man. The film received predominantly negative reviews and was a commercial failure. The Times of India said: "For the umpteenth time, Ms. Rai looks drop-dead gorgeous. And that's about it. She is like that picture postcard you get when what you were actually waiting for is a letter. It's very beautiful to look at, but is of no use because it says nothing." In the same year, Rai took on the lead role of Tilo in Paul Mayeda Berges's romantic fantasy film The Mistress of Spices, an adaptation of the eponymous novel by Chitra Banerjee Divakaruni. Critics gave the film negative reviews and it was a commercial failure. Peter Bradshaw of The Guardian called Rai's performance "annoying" and wrote she "wafts and simpers" through the entire film. Her only successful venture of 2005 was a special appearance in Shaad Ali's crime comedy Bunty Aur Babli, in which she featured in the popular item number "Kajra Re".

In 2006, Rai starred in J. P. Dutta's Umrao Jaan and Yash Raj Films' Dhoom 2. Umrao Jaan is an adaptation of Mirza Hadi Ruswa's Urdu novel Umrao Jaan Ada (1905), which tells the story of a doomed courtesan from 19th-century Lucknow. Rai played the titular role, which was played by Rekha in the first film adaptation of the novel (1981). Reviewers, while comparing the film to the 1981 adaptation, were critical of the film and of her performance. According to Joshi Poonam of the BBC: "While only Rai could emulate the grace and poise of Rekha, she doesn't quite capture the intensity of Umrao's abiding melancholy", and "Rai's incandescent beauty and artistry [..] does indeed keep the audience watching, though not necessarily emotionally engaged". In the Sanjay Gadhvi-directed adventure film Dhoom 2, Rai portrayed Sunehri, a petty thief who helps police catch an illusive criminal; the film has an ensemble cast including Hrithik Roshan, Abhishek Bachchan, Bipasha Basu and Uday Chopra. Critics gave Dhoom 2 mixed-to-positive reviews and the film was Rai's first major commercial success since Devdas. The film was declared a blockbuster, and became the highest-grossing Indian film of 2006 with gross revenues of over ₹1.11 billion (US$12 million). Rediff.com commented: "[Rai] is all gloss and no depth. You seldom feel any tension in her behaviour and expressions. ...Sunehri enters the film nearly 50 minutes after its opening in a disguise. In no time, she is wearing the flimsiest of clothes. Once she opens her mouth—and she does it two minutes after appearing in the film—she spoils the image." Nonetheless, her performance earned her a sixth Filmfare Award nomination in the Best Actress category.

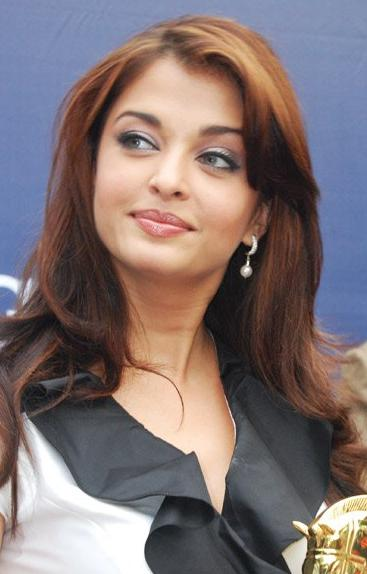
Rai in 2007

In 2007, Rai played the wife of Abhishek Bachchan's character in Mani Ratnam's social drama Guru, which is fictionalised biography of businessman Dhirubhai Ambani. Guru tells the rag to riches story of an uneducated man who builds a multinational corporation. The film met with international critical acclaim and was a box-office success. Richard Corliss of Time called Rai's character as an "ornament" but Raja Sen from Rediff.com said she had given "arguably her finest performance, visible especially when she takes over the film's climax." Rai received her seventh Best Actress nomination at Filmfare for her performance in the film.

She next starred alongside Naveen Andrews and Miranda Richardson in Jag Mundhra's independent British drama Provoked as the real-life character Kiranjit Ahluwalia, a non-resident Indian who murders her husband after suffering years of domestic abuse. Rai earned mostly positive comments for her performance. Critic Indu Mirani from Daily News and Analysis wrote: "Aishwarya Rai plays the battered wife in what is undoubtedly one of her best performances to date. Rai convincingly goes through the various stages of shock, bewilderment, remorse and finally vindication". The film was internationally well-received and was a moderate commercial success in the UK. That same year, she starred alongside Ben Kingsley, Colin Firth and Thomas Sangster as the Indian warrior Mira in Doug Lefler's epic film The Last Legion.

In 2008, she garnered critical and box-office success with Ashutosh Gowariker's period romantic drama Jodhaa Akbar (now credited as Rai Bachchan, following her marriage to Abhishek Bachchan the previous year). The film narrates a partly fictionalised account of a marriage of convenience between the Mughal emperor Jalaluddin Muhammad Akbar (played by Hrithik Roshan) and the Rajput princess Jodha Bai (played by Rai Bachchan). Rajeev Masand noted: "Rai is wonderfully restrained and uses her eyes expertly to communicate so much, making this one of her finest outings on screen". The film grossed ₹1.12 billion (US$12 million) and earned Rai Bachchan a Best Actress nomination at the Filmfare Awards ceremony. She then co-starred with her husband Abhishek Bachchan and her father-in-law Amitabh Bachchan, in Ram Gopal Verma's political drama Sarkar Raj, a sequel to the 2005 box-office hit Sarkar. Rai Bachchan was cast as Anita Rajan, the CEO of an international power firm who proposes to set up a plant in rural Maharashtra. The film was a critical and commercial success, and praise was directed towards the three leads' performances.

=== Shift in career pace and hiatus (2009–2014) ===
Rai Bachchan's next role was in the 2009 Harald Zwart-directed spy comedy The Pink Panther 2, in which she stars alongside Steve Martin, Jean Reno and Emily Mortimer. Rai Bachchan portrayed Sonia Solandres, a seductive criminology expert. Like its predecessor, The Pink Panther 2 received negative reviews from critics but grossed $34 million at the American box office. Roger Ebert wrote: "Rai is breathtaking in Bollywood films, where they devote a great deal of expertise to admiring beauty, but here she's underutilized and too much in the background". USA Today called her expressions "wooden" and added: "She looks gorgeous, but her expression rarely changes".

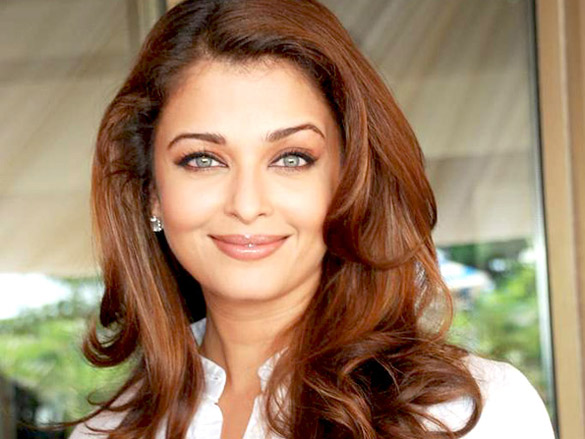
Rai Bachchan at the press meet of Enthiran in 2010

In 2010, Mani Ratnam cast Rai Bachchan in his twin, modern-day adaptations of the Indian epic Ramayana—the Tamil version titled Raavanan and the Hindi version Raavan—which were filmed simultaneously. In both versions, Rai Bachchan plays Ragini, the wife of a superintendent of police who is kidnapped by a bandit. Her role was modeled on Sita, the female protagonist of Ramayana. Rai Bachchan returned to Tamil cinema after a 10-year gap with Raavanan. Raavanan was a commercial success whereas the Hindi version was a commercial failure. The films received mixed reviews from film critics, as did Rai Bachchan's performances. Kaveree Bamzai of India Today wrote: "Rai's Sita is one of the best things in the film ... her performance is heartfelt—this is a performer who is at ease playing women, rather than girls". Critics Aniruddha Guha and Rajeev Masand criticised her character and said: "She's left to scream and shriek and hiss".

Rai Bachchan's next role was opposite Rajinikanth in the science-fiction Tamil film Enthiran (2010), which S. Shankar directed. She was cast as Sana, a college student and the girlfriend of Rajinikanth's character. At the time of its release, Enthiran was the most-expensive Indian film production and became one of the highest-grossing Indian films of all time. She then appeared as Mala, an impetuous brat, in Vipul Shah's Action Replayy; a science-fiction comedy co-starring Akshay Kumar, Aditya Roy Kapur and Neha Dhupia.

Rai Bachchan's final film of 2010 was the drama Guzaarish, which was her third collaboration with director Sanjay Leela Bhansali and actor Hrithik Roshan. The film tells the story of Ethan Mascarenas, a quadriplegic former magician (Roshan) who after years of struggle, files an appeal for euthanasia. Rai Bachchan plays Sophia D'Souza, Mascarenas' nurse, whose alcohol-addicted husband abuses her. Due to her past associations with Bhansali, Rai Bachchan agreed to the project before reading its script. Despite failing at the box office, Guzaarish met with positive critical reviews. The Telegraph described it as "one of Rai's best performances" and The Times of India said: "Rai is a stunning picture of fire and grace, walking away with certain scenes by her sheer vitality".

In 2011, Rai Bachchan was cast as the protagonist of Madhur Bhandarkar's social drama Heroine but due to her pregnancy, she was replaced with Kareena Kapoor, the original choice for the role.

Between 2011 and 2014, Rai Bachchan took a hiatus from acting, with no film releases during this period. She remained in the public eye through select brand endorsements and appearances but did not take on new film projects. Director Farah Khan reportedly approached her in 2013 for her film Happy New Year to play the female lead opposite Shah Rukh Khan; she showed initial interest but was never cast. In a later interview, Rai Bachchan stated that she declined the offer because she believed that since her husband, Abhishek Bachchan, would not be paired opposite her, the audience might not accept the pairing. The role was eventually played by Deepika Padukone.

=== Selective work (2015–2023) ===
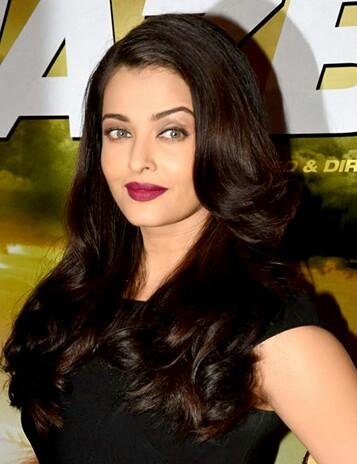
Rai Bachchan in 2015, during the promotion of Jazbaa

After a five-year sabbatical from film acting, Rai Bachchan made a comeback with Sanjay Gupta's drama-thriller Jazbaa, co-starring with Shabana Azmi and Irrfan Khan. She also served as producer. The film is a remake of the Korean thriller Seven Days (2007); Rai Bachchan plays Anuradha Verma, a criminal lawyer who is forced to defend a rapist in exchange for her daughter's safety. Shubha Shetty-Saha of Mid-Day criticised the film's unnecessary and intrusive melodrama, and said Rai Bachchan "looks the part and even does a fairly decent job, barring certain emotional scenes where she clearly goes over the top". The film underperformed at the box office.

In 2016, Rai Bachchan starred in Omung Kumar's biographical drama Sarbjit, which is based on the life of Indian farmer Sarabjit Singh, who was convicted of terrorism by a Pakistani court and whose sister Dalbir Kaur campaigned for his release. Rai Bachchan plays Dalbir Kaur and Randeep Hooda plays Sarabjit Singh. The film premiered at the 69th Cannes Film Festival. A few reviewers said Rai Bachchan was "miscast" because she neither looked nor sounded like a Sikh woman. Her Punjabi accent and her over-the-top performance in few scenes were largely criticised, though several critics noted how much she stands out in the film's quiet scenes. Rajeev Masand said Rai Bachchan is "required to scream and shout and weep copiously to express her anguish; the shrillness does her no favors. In quieter moments – like one in which Dalbir can't bear to part with her stillborn baby – the actress shines." Her role earned her tenth Filmfare Award for Best Actress nomination. The film earned over ₹440 million (US$4.7 million) worldwide against a production budget of ₹150 million (US$1.6 million).

Rai Bachchan's final film role of 2016 was in Karan Johar's musical romantic drama Ae Dil Hai Mushkil, alongside Anushka Sharma and Ranbir Kapoor, in which she plays a poet named Saba. Rai Bachchan received positive reviews for her performance despite having limited screen time. Joe Leydon of Variety considered her to be the film's prime asset and wrote she "seems to have wandered in from another movie, one where emotions are conveyed in subtler and more affecting fashion. When she takes her leave from Ae Dil Hai Mushkil, you may wish you could go with her." The film became one of Rai Bachchan's biggest commercial successes with revenues of over ₹2 billion (US$21 million).

Two years later, she played a singer who is kidnapped by a troubled father in the comedy-drama Fanney Khan (2018), an adaptation of the Belgian film Everybody's Famous! (2000), co-starring Anil Kapoor and Rajkummar Rao. Uday Bhatia of Mint disliked the film and called Rai Bachchan "too unruffled a screen presence to convincingly sell the kind of silliness this film requires". Rai Bachchan was also initially reported to be making a cameo in 2.0, a stand-alone sequel to her 2010 film Enthiran, but she did not appear in the film. However, Sana Vaseegaran (her character from the first film) is referenced through a photograph in one scene, with the character's voice dubbed by Savitha Radhakrishnan.

Rai Bachchan again worked with Mani Ratnam on Ponniyin Selvan: I (2022) and Ponniyin Selvan: II (2023), a two-part Tamil ensemble period film that is based on Kalki Krishnamurthy's eponymous epic novel. Both parts were filmed concurrently. Rai Bachchan plays Nandini, a scheming Chola queen. Haricharan Pudipeddi of Hindustan Times called her performance in the first part the best among the ensemble cast and in the second part to be the best of her career while Sonil Dedhia of News 18 said Rai Bachchan is "wonderfully restrained and uses her eyes expertly to communicate so much". Ponniyin Selvan: I earned ₹5 billion (US$53 million) worldwide to become one of the highest-grossing Tamil films of all time while Ponniyin Selvan: II grossed over ₹3 billion (US$32 million) worldwide.

== Off-screen work ==
=== Stage performances ===
In 1999, Rai, along with Aamir Khan, Rani Mukerji, Akshaye Khanna and Twinkle Khanna, participated in a world tour called the Magnificent Five. In 2001, she appeared in her first North American concert tour Craze 2001 alongside Anil Kapoor, Aamir Khan, Preity Zinta and Gracy Singh. The show faced early cancellation due to the 11 September 2001 attacks in the US and the team prepared to quickly return to India but the tour continued in Canada.

Rai Bachchan appeared with other Bollywood actors at the closing ceremony of the 2006 Commonwealth Games in Melbourne, Australia. The performance showcased Indian culture as a lead-up to India's hosting of the 2010 Commonwealth Games. Between July and August 2008, Rai Bachchan, her husband Abhishek Bachchan, her father-in-law Amitabh Bachchan, and actors Preity Zinta, Ritesh Deshmukh and Madhuri Dixit starred in the "Unforgettable World Tour" stage production, which visited the US, Canada, the UK, the Netherlands, and Trinidad and Tobago.

=== Business interests ===
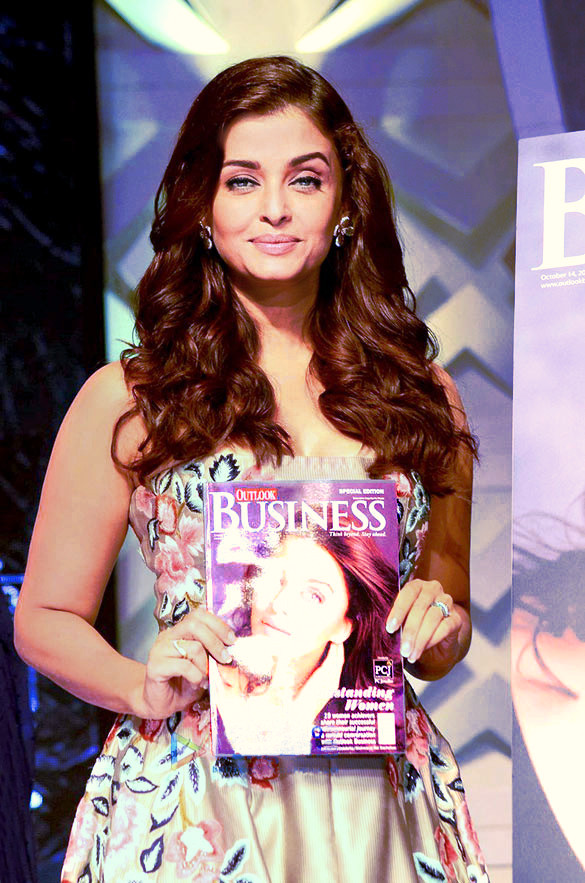
Rai Bachchan receives Outlook Business Outstanding Woman Award, 2016

Rai Bachchan was involved in administrative operations of her father-in-law's entertainment company, Amitabh Bachchan Corporation.

In 2016, Rai Bachchan was named in the Panama Papers, a dataset that was leaked from a former Panamanian offshore law firm and was published on the Internet. She, her parents and her brother were listed as directors of an offshore entity named Amic Partners Limited in British Virgin Islands between 2005 and 2008. In December 2021, the Enforcement Directorate questioned Rai Bachchan, who denied any knowledge of the company and stated her father was in charge of her financial matters. In 2019, Rai Bachchan and her mother invested ₹10 million (US$110,000) in the environmental startup form Ambee, which measures air quality and other parameters using data. In 2021, Kalaari Capital-backed nutrition-based healthcare company Possible secured ₹50 million (US$530,000) from Rai Bachchan in a major funding round.

=== Endorsements ===
Rai Bachchan made her first commercial for Camlin exam pencils when she was in the ninth grade. She became popular after appearing in a commercial for Pepsi with actor Aamir Khan. She is the only actress who has endorsed both Pepsi and Coca-Cola.

Rai Bachchan is one of the top brand ambassadors in India. In 1999, she was appointed as Longines Ambassador of Elegance. In 2003, she became a global brand ambassador for L'Oréal alongside Andie MacDowell, Eva Longoria and Penélope Cruz. She has modelled for Longines, L'Oréal, Titan Watches, Coca-Cola, Lakmé Cosmetics, Casio pager, Philips, Palmolive, Lux, Fuji films, Nakshatra Diamond Jewellery and Kalyan Jewellers. She was named the official brand ambassador for De Beers diamonds in India. In 2012, Rai Bachchan was ranked the world's second-most-popular watch-brand ambassador in a survey World Watch Report conducted. In 2013, TTK Group engaged Rai Bachchan and her husband as brand ambassadors. In 2023, CNBC TV18 reported that she earned between ₹60 million (US$640,000) and ₹70 million (US$750,000) per day for brand endorsements. In 2026, she was named the global brand ambassador for JW Marriott.

=== Charity work ===
Rai is the brand ambassador for Eye Bank Association of India's nationwide campaign to promote eye donation. In November 2004, she created the Aishwarya Rai Foundation to help needy people in India. In 2005, she became a brand ambassador for Pulse Polio, a campaign the Government of India established in 1994 to eradicate poliomyelitis from the country. In the same year, Rai was appointed spokesperson for the International Year of Microcredit, raising awareness of the United Nations' poverty alleviation efforts.

In February 2005, Rai performed with other Bollywood stars at the HELP! Telethon Concert, an event to raise money for the victims of the 2004 tsunami earthquake. Along with other members of the Bachchan family, she laid the foundation brick of a school in her name for underprivileged girls in Daulatpur, a village in Uttar Pradesh, in 2008. The Bachchan family announced it would fund the school's construction. The land allocated for the construction was the subject of dispute between Rai Bachchan's father-in-law and fellow actor and politician Jaya Prada. The issue was reported to be resolved by 2012, however, as of 2018 construction on the site had yet to begin.

Rai Bachchan supports PETA India. In 2009, she was appointed as the first Goodwill Ambassador of Smile Train, an international charity that provides free Cleft lip and palate surgery to children in need. Her work with Smile Train focused on India and 76 other developing countries. In September 2012, Rai Bachchan joined the United Nations Secretary General Ban Ki-moon and Hollywood actor Michael Douglas at a ceremony in New York City to commemorate the International Day of Peace. Later that week, she was appointed as the new international Goodwill Ambassador for UNAIDS, the joint United Nations program on AIDS and HIV. She was tasked with raising awareness about protection of children from HIV infection and increasing access to antiretroviral treatment.

== Artistry and image ==
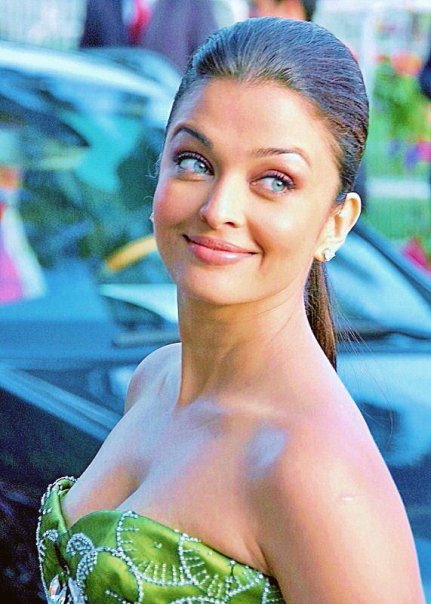
At the 2008 Cannes Film Festival

Rai Bachchan is among India's most-popular and highest-paid actors. At the beginning of her career, some Indian media described her as "a cold fish" and "a non-actress", and criticised her when some of her movies did not perform well at the box office. Despite receiving multiple offers to star in movies, she was hesitant to accept roles without further evaluation, saying: "I'd rather look before I leap". In an attempt to balance motherhood and her work, Rai Bachchan limited the number of her projects in the years after giving birth.

In 2023, Anjali Belgaumkar of The Indian Express noted despite appearing in around 10 films in a decade, Rai Bachchan still appealed to the younger generation because her impact was not limited to her on-screen roles or fashion choices but there was also an element of "divaness" that made her popular. Hrithik Roshan, who co-starred with Rai Bachchan in three movies, commended her for her work ethic, saying: "Her level of patience is inspiring. If she has to sit like Jodhaa all day, she will. If she has to stand all day dressed like Sophiya, so that the dress doesn't crease, she will." Filmmaker Omung Kumar believed her to be a "director's actor" who could mould herself into any character under the right guidance. Despite constant media speculation, Rai Bachchan keeps her personal life well-guarded and limits her activities on social media. Off-screen and in the press, she is known for her sensitive, caring nature and she is reportedly driven by her instincts. In an interview, Rai Bachchan stated she is "like water, I just naturally, easily fit and adjust to any situation. That's always been my mind space and my temperament."

=== Media image ===
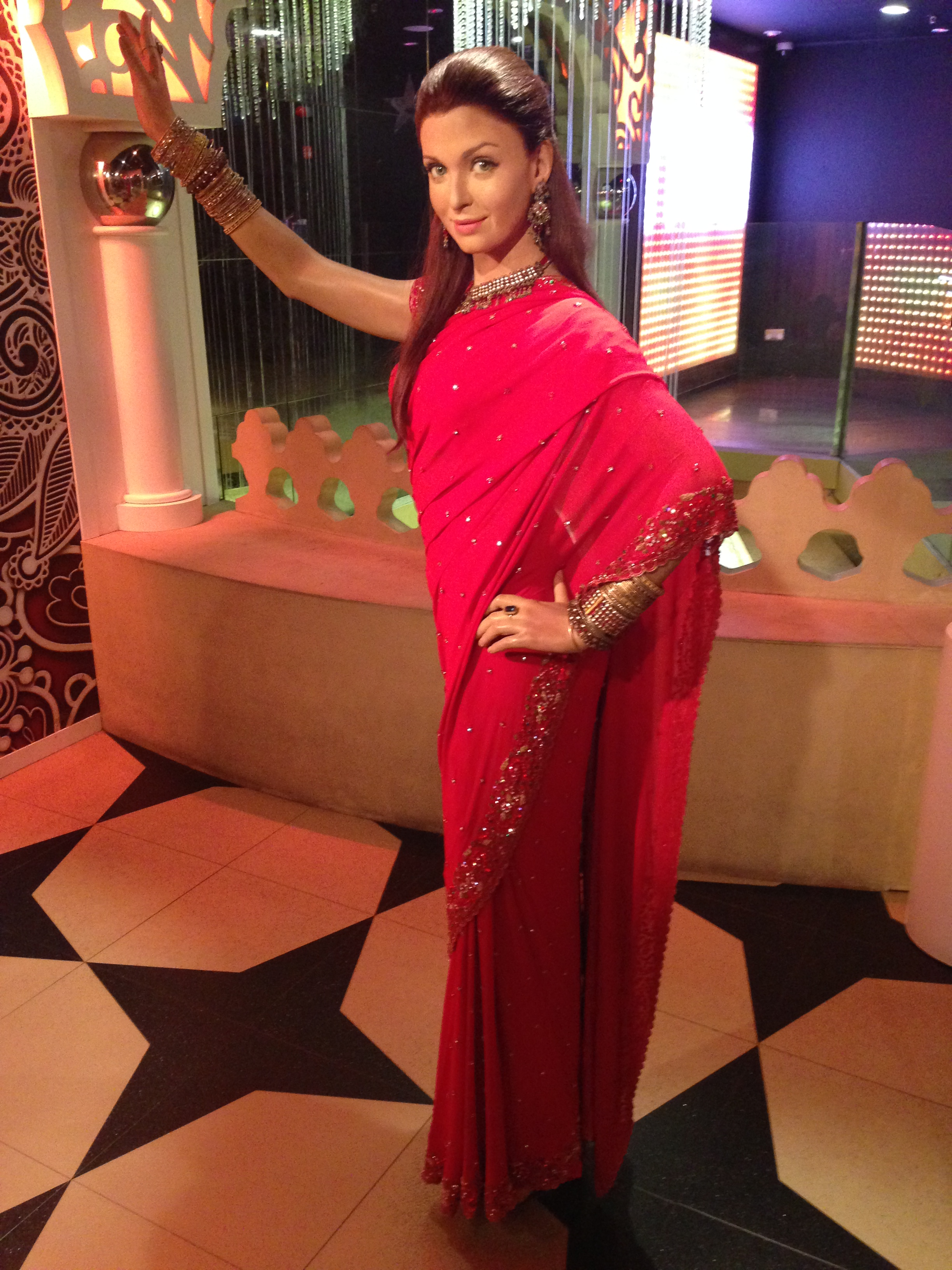
Rai's wax figure at Madame Tussauds, London — the first Indian actress to be featured at the museum in 2004.

Fans and media frequently refer to Rai Bachchan by the nicknames "Ash" and "Aish" but Rai Bachchan has stated she dislikes being called these names, and has discouraged people from referring to her using names other than "Aishwarya" because she does not want to "spoil [her] good name". She was placed at number one in The Tribune's list of Bollywood's top five actresses of 1999. In 2001, Forbes named her among the top-five Indian movie stars. She was placed in Rediff.com's annual listing of "Best Bollywood Actresses" for six consecutive years (2003–2008). She was also placed in Rediff.com's other listings; "Powerlist: Top Bollywood Actresses", "Bollywood's Best Actresses of all time", "Top 10 Actresses of 2000–2010", and "Women of Many Faces". Filmfare also placed Rai Bachchan in its lists of "Top Ten Actresses" in 2003 and 2004, and she ranked eighth in its Power List in 2007. In 2004, Time chose her as one of the 100 most influential people in the world and she appeared on the cover of its 2003 Asia edition. Rai Bachchan has appeared on television chat shows such as Late Show with David Letterman, and was the first Bollywood personality to appear on Oprah's segment "Women Across the Globe". For two consecutive years, she was listed among India Today's list of 50 most-powerful people in India (2004 and 2005).

In October 2004, a wax figure of Rai was put on display in London's Madame Tussaud's wax museum. She was the sixth Indian and the second Bollywood personality—after her father-in-law Amitabh Bachchan—to get this honour. In 2007, the same figure was displayed at Madame Tussaud's museum in Times Square, New York, followed by another version in Washington. In 2005 in the Netherlands, a cultivar of tulip was named after her. Also in 2005, toy manufacturer Mattel released a limited edition of Barbie dolls of Rai in the United Kingdom.

In 2008 and 2011, Verve magazine placed Rai Bachchan in its list of the country's most-powerful women. In 2009, Forbes listed her 387th of 1,411 actors on its list of the most-bankable stars in Hollywood. She was the highest-ranked Indian actor on the list. In a poll conducted by the newspaper Daily News and Analysis in 2009, Rai Bachchan was voted one of India's most-popular icons. In the same year, she made appearances on the television shows Martha and The Tyra Banks Show. She was present on Box Office India's lists of "Top Bollywood Actresses" for ten years, and was ranked first on its top actresses lists from 2000 to 2009, and was ranked second on its list of "All Time Top Actress". She was placed in Outlook India's list of "75 Best Bollywood Actresses". From 2012 to 2015, and in 2018, Rai Bachchan was placed on Forbes India's Celebrity 100 list, which is based on the income and popularity of Indian celebrities, peaking at number 34 in 2015 with an annual income of ₹480 million (US$5.1 million). The market research firm YouGov named Rai Bachchan the world's eleventh-most-admired person of 2018. In 2024, she was placed 3rd on IMDb's list of 100 Most Viewed Indian Stars. Her wealth has been estimated at ₹7.76 billion (US$83 million). As of 2024, she is estimated to be the second richest actress in India.

== Appearance ==
In the 2000s and 2010s, media often described Rai as "the most beautiful woman in the world". Her physical appearance and performances have made her a style icon for women. Sanjay Leela Bhansali, who directed Rai Bachchan in Hum Dil De Chuke Sanam (1999), Devdas (2002) and Guzaarish (2010), commented on her ability to express emotions through her eyes, saying: "There's something in her eyes. That's the most important aspect of her beauty. They are not 'normal'. They are so powerful that even if you don't give her dialogue, they emote." He also praised her ability to perform musical numbers despite physical injuries or pain.

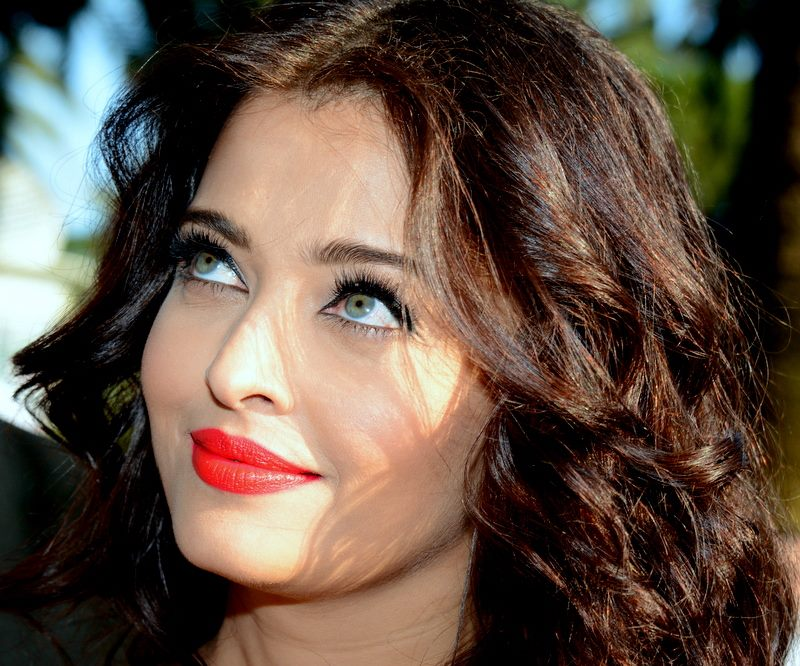
Rai Bachchan in 2014; her blue/green eyes have been identified as a trademark by the Indian media.

In a reader poll conducted by UK's Hello! magazine, Rai was voted "the most attractive woman of 2003". In the same year, she appeared in Rolling Stone magazine's annual "Hot List". Rediff.com placed her first on its lists of "Bollywood's Most Beautiful Actresses" and "Best Dressed Woman". She was the subject of a 60 Minutes profile on 2 January 2005, which said: "at least according to thousands of Web sites, Internet polls and even Julia Roberts", Rai Bachchan was "the world's most beautiful woman". The British magazine Maxim ranked her first on its list of "Hottest Women of India". In 2005, Harpers and Queen's list of "Most Beautiful Women in The World" ranked Rai ninth. In May 2006, she was featured in People magazine as one of the "World's Most Beautiful People". The UK magazine Eastern Eye ranked her third in its list of "Asia's Sexiest Women" in 2006, and she was ranked in the top ten in 2007 and 2009. She again appeared on the list in following years and in 2019, she was chosen as one of the sexiest Asian women of the decade. In 2008, American television channel E!: Entertainment listed Rai Bachchan's eyes as the sexiest on its list of Sexiest Body Parts.

Rai Bachchan ranked second in The Times of India's list of the 50 most-desirable women of 2010, and was ranked ninth in 2011. The Times of India also placed her fifth in its list of "50 Beautiful Faces", and named her as one of the "Forever Desirable Women". In 2011, India Today noted there were over 17,000 websites dedicated to Rai Bachchan. In the same year, she received negative publicity for failing to lose her post-pregnancy weight. Despite the criticism, she appeared on the red carpet at the "AmfAR Cinema Against Aids" gala at the 2012 Cannes Film Festival—her 11th appearance at the festival. Later that year, Rai Bachchan appeared in New York magazine's list of "Forty Women That Women Find Beautiful", where she ranked in 21st position; New York magazine said: "She may be the 'world's most beautiful woman' but what we really love is that she never feels fragile onscreen".

== Personal life ==
In 1999, Rai began dating Bollywood actor Salman Khan; their relationship was often reported in media until the couple separated in 2002. She cited "abuse (verbal, physical and emotional), infidelity and indignity" on the part of Khan as reasons for ending the relationship. She then had a romantic relationship with actor Vivek Oberoi that ended in 2005.

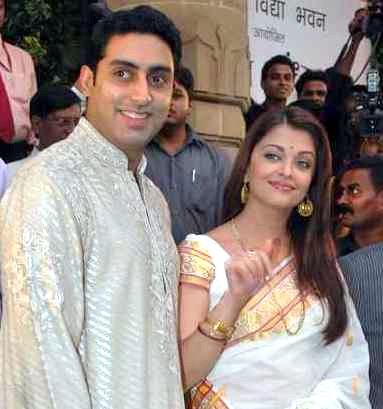
Rai Bachchan with her husband Abhishek Bachchan in 2010

Actor Abhishek Bachchan fell in love with Rai whilst filming Dhoom 2. Their engagement was announced on 14 January 2007 and was later confirmed by his father Amitabh Bachchan. The couple married on 20 April 2007 according to traditional Hindu rites. North Indian and Bengali ceremonies were also performed. The wedding took place in a private ceremony at the Bachchan residence in Juhu, Mumbai. Indian media have described them as a supercouple. Rai Bachchan is very close to her family and lived with them in Bandra, Mumbai, until her marriage. She is Hindu and deeply religious. Rai Bachchan gave birth to a girl on 16 November 2011.

Rai Bachchan was accompanied by her husband to Cannes Film Festival shortly after their marriage, and later to The Oprah Winfrey Show, on which they appeared on 28 September 2009. Rai Bachchan is the first Indian celebrity to appear twice on The Oprah Winfrey Show. She attended the 83rd Academy Awards with her husband.

In September 2025, Rai Bachchan secured temporary relief from the Delhi High Court after raising concerns about her name, image, and likeness being misused—especially through AI-generated content and unauthorized commercial use online. The court directed platforms like Google and various e-commerce sites to remove or block the flagged content within 72 hours, with further proceedings set for 15 January 2026.

== Awards and recognition ==
Rai Bachchan has received two Filmfare Awards for Best Actress for Hum Dil De Chuke Sanam (1999) and Devdas (2002). She was appointed to the jury of the 2003 Cannes Film Festival and was the first Indian actress to represent India as a jury member in the festival.

In 2009, Rai Bachchan received a Padma Shri for her contributions to Indian cinema. In 2012, she accepted the Order of Arts and Letters from the Government of France, which she had earlier refused because her father was seriously ill and she wanted her whole family to attend the award ceremony.

Awards and achievements
| Preceded by (Philippines) Ruffa Gutierrez | Miss World Asia & Oceania; 1994 | Succeeded by (South Korea) Choi Yoon-young |
| Preceded by (Jamaica) Lisa Hanna | Miss World; 1994 | Succeeded by (Venezuela) Jacqueline Aguilera |
