= Kajra Re =

Indian movie song

Song by Alisha Chinai, Shankar Mahadevan and Javed Ali

from the album Bunty Aur Babli soundtrack
- Language: Hindi-Urdu
- Released: 2005
- Genre: Ghazal, Qawwali, filmi
- Length: 8:04 (soundtrack album); 7:50 (music video)
- Label: Yash Raj Music
- Composer: Shankar–Ehsaan–Loy
- Lyricist: Gulzar
- Producer: Shankar–Ehsaan–Loy

Audio sample
- Kajra Re: file; help

Music video
- Kajra Re on YouTube

"Kajra Re" (transl. Kohl-like dark (eyes)) is a song composed by Shankar–Ehsaan–Loy, written by Gulzar and sung by the playback singers Alisha Chinai, Shankar Mahadevan and Javed Ali. It is included in the soundtrack of the 2005 film Bunty Aur Babli, starring Amitabh Bachchan, Abhishek Bachchan and Rani Mukerji. The music video features Amitabh and Abhishek at a nightclub while Aishwarya Rai, in a special appearance, plays a courtesan trying to express her desires to attract the male, or her client, sings for Amitabh while ignoring Abhishek's approaches. Amitabh eventually joins Abhishek and Aishwarya in the singing and dancing.

== Production and development ==
"Kajra Re" is inspired from a folk song from the Braj region, in which the celebrated dark eyes are Krishna's. The song originated in Vrindavan and is traditionally attributed to the Rasik Saint Shri Haridas Baba. Over time, it was transmitted through informal performances and adaptations, eventually gaining recognition beyond its original religious and regional context.

The words "Tujhse milna Purani Dilli mein..." ("...meet you in Old Delhi") have been rendered by Amitabh Bachchan. It was a very famous "item number" from the movie Bunty Aur Babli. Uncommon to other "item numbers", the music was influenced by the genre of kajari. The trio have used sitar to make it sound more Indian. Amitabh Bachchan, after initially hearing the song, demanded a few changes, but the director, Shaad Ali, and producer, Aditya Chopra, convinced him against them. The song was composed in half a day. Alisha was chosen for the female vocals since her anglicized accent was meant to provide an essentially different intonation.

== Reception and impact ==
The melody of this song was used as the main method to promote the film and the soundtrack. The song became extremely popular among the masses and was hugely successful on Indian music charts. The Hindustan Times described it as "the reinvention of the qawwali by Shankar-Ehsaan-Roy and Gulzar" and called it "the item number of the decade." "Kajra Re" featured on top in Rediff's 2005's list of top 5 songs.

It was voted as the song of the year by three radio stations, including Lotus FM, a station popular among the Indian diaspora in South Africa. The song was also featured in Caminho das Indias, a marathon telenovela that ran on Brazil's popular Rede Globo. The track was featured in Hindustan Times' Songs of the Century, which deemed it to be the "undisputed item song of the decade."

== Music video ==
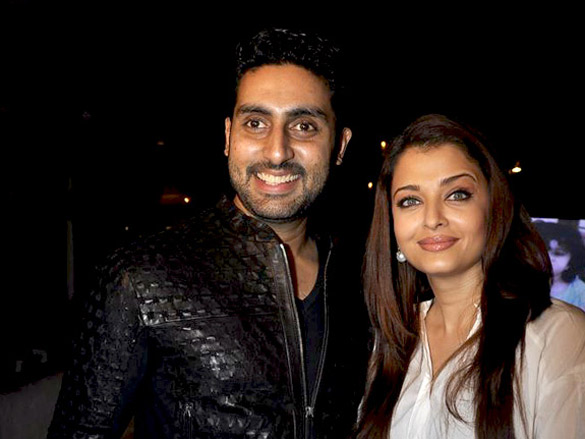
Aishwarya Rai appeared alongside Abhishek Bachchan in the music video

Before the song sequence, Amitabh Bachchan, playing a cop in the movie, relates his story of unrequited love in the city of Delhi to Abhishek Bachchan (his real-life son), who plays a criminal pursued by the cop, which is later alluded to in the song. Aishwarya Rai's character, a bar girl, sympathizes with Amitabh's character and plays courtesan. The dance, choreographed by Vaibhavi Merchant, features Aishwarya in a brocade choli and dipped ghagra, kohl, and some lip gloss.

== Awards ==
Alisha Chinai won the 2005 Filmfare Best Female Playback Award, 2005 MTV Immies for the "Best Female Singer" and the 2005 Bollywood Movie Award - Best Playback Singer Female for the song, while Gulzar was awarded the Best Lyricist Award in almost all major award functions including the IIFA and Filmfare Awards, for the song. Aishwarya Rai Bachchan won the award for the "Best Performance In A Song - Female" at the 2005 MTV Immies.

Vaibhavi Merchant won the following awards:

- IIFA Best Choreography Award
- Zee Best Choreography Award
- Star Screen Awards - Best Choreography
- Apsara Best Choreography Award
