= Jazbaa =

2015 Hindi film directed by Sanjay Gupta

- Theatrical release poster
- Directed by: Sanjay Gupta
- Screenplay by: Sanjay Gupta; Robin Bhatt
- Based on: Seven Days by Won Shin-yun
- Produced by: Akash Chawla; Anuradha Gupta; Raina Sachin Joshi; Sachin Joshi
- Starring: Aishwarya Rai Bachchan; Irrfan Khan; Jackie Shroff; Shabana Azmi
- Cinematography: Sameer Arya
- Edited by: Bunty Negi
- Music by: Songs: Amjad-Nadeem; Arko; Badshah; Background Score: Amar Mohile
- Production companies: Essel Vision Productions; Viking Media & Entertainment; White Feather Films
- Distributed by: Zee Studios
- Release date: 9 October 2015
- Running time: 123 minutes
- Country: India
- Language: Hindi
- Budget: ₹28–30 crore
- Box office: ₹42.67 crore

Jazbaa (transl. Passion/Emotion) is a 2015 Indian Hindi-language action thriller film directed by Sanjay Gupta. The film's narrative revolves around an attorney forced to defend an unsavory criminal after her daughter is kidnapped. It stars Aishwarya Rai Bachchan and Irrfan Khan, with Shabana Azmi, Jackie Shroff, Atul Kulkarni and Chandan Roy Sanyal in supporting roles. It is a remake of the 2007 South Korean film Seven Days. The film was released on 9 October 2015. The film marked Aishwarya's return on screen after a five-year break.

Rai's performance received nominations for Best Actor in an Action Role at the Big Star Entertainment Awards and the Screen Award for Best Actress (Popular Choice). She won the Power-packed performance of the year at Stardust Awards.

== Plot ==
Anuradha Verma is a prominent criminal defense lawyer and a single mother who has never lost a case. On the day of a parent-child race organised in her daughter Sanaya's school, Sanaya is abducted. The kidnapper contacts Anuradha and tells her that she has to defend a convicted felon in order to get her daughter back. Anuradha lies to the police and her friends, saying that Sanaya is safe at her grandmother's house, so that the law enforcement is not involved. The felon is Niyaaz Shaikh, who was charged for the rape and murder of a young woman named Sia, and the case against him is set for hearing in four days. The kidnapper keeps track of Anuradha very closely to make sure that she complies with his demands. All evidence suggests that Niyaaz is the perpetrator, so Anuradha has to work hard to win the case, and with time running out, she tries to get help from her policeman friend Yohan, who has been suspended from the force by other corrupt officers for flouting the rules and regulations too often.

The case against Niyaaz is being closely monitored by influential politician Mahesh Maklai. Mahesh asks renowned public prosecutor Ronit, who has been defeated by Anuradha in the past, to take up the case as rape is a critical issue the current government is fighting. Anuradha tries to gather information by hook or crook, including lying to Sia's mother Garima Chaudhary (who Sia was slightly estranged from since her parents' divorce). Anuradha discovers that Mahesh's son, Sam, was Sia's boyfriend, and Niyaaz was their drug dealer. Niyaaz had raped and killed Sia after delivering drugs to her home, while Sam was intoxicated and passed out.

As Anuradha returns home one evening, she is taken hostage by Mahesh and his henchmen. The politician explains to her that when Sam woke up, he panicked and contacted his father to help him dispose of Sia's corpse. Cutting the gas pipes and planning to set Anuradha's house on fire, the men leave her bound and gagged on the floor. However, she unties herself and escapes.

After returning to court, Anuradha is able to get Niyaaz out on bail due to the missing murder weapon and also implicates Mahesh and Sam as co-conspirators of the murder, thus destroying Mahesh's political career. As promised, Sanaya is released, but suffers an allergic reaction. Fortunately, Anuradha is able to reach her daughter in time.

As Yohan and Anuradha continue digging, they realise that Garima was behind Sanaya's kidnapping. Garima blackmailed Anuradha to free Niyaaz, allowing her to kidnap and burn him to death, since she found the death sentence or life imprisonment to be insufficient punishment for someone who brutally raped and murdered her daughter. Garima insists she never meant to hurt Sanaya, and apologises to Anuradha for what she put her through. Though furious, Anuradha offers her services as a lawyer to Garima when she is apprehended by police.

== Cast ==
- Aishwarya Rai Bachchan as Advocate Anuradha Verma
- Irrfan Khan as Inspector Yohan
- Shabana Azmi as Garima
- Jackie Shroff as MP and Home Minister Mahesh Khanna
- Chandan Roy Sanyal as Niyaaz Shaikh, Sia's murderer
- Atul Kulkarni as Prosecution Lawyer Ronit
- Abhimanyu Singh as Abbas Yusuf, Anuradha's client
- Sara Arjun as Sanaya Verma, Anuradha's daughter
- Priya Banerjee as Sia Chowdhury, Garima's daughter
- Siddhanth Kapoor as Sam Maklai, Mahesh's son
- Rajiv Kachroo as Inspector Joe
- Sanjay Gurbaxani as Advocate Boman
- Ankur Vikal as Vijay
- Rajat Kaul as Benny
- Shivraj Walvekar as ACP Rokde
- Sangeeta Kanhayat as Nazia Qureshi, Niyaaz's wife
- Kaizaad Kotwal as Dr Satish
- Pramod Pathak as Satnam
- Rajeev Verma as Binnu
- Sukaniya as Warden Amrita
- Shilpa Mehta as Sulekha Tai, maid servant
- Diksha Kaushal in the item number "Aaj Raat Ka Scene"

== Production ==
According to reports, John Abraham was supposed to play the male lead in the film. However, the film-maker Sanjay Gupta dismissed the rumors and said "John was never cast for the role". Irrfan Khan was signed to star opposite Aishwarya and Shabana Azmi, Jackie Shroff, Atul Kulkarni and Chandan Roy Sanyal were confirmed as a part of the film's supporting cast.

Aishwarya studied to portray a lawyer in the film. She met lawyers and even went through various court case clippings to get the nuances of her character right. Filming began in January 2015, and the film was shot in and around Mumbai. The shooting of the film was completed in 51 days.

== Soundtrack ==
Jazbaa

Soundtrack album by Amjad-Nadeem, Arko, Badshah
- Released: 7 September 2015
- Genre: Feature film soundtrack
- Length: 20:13
- Language: Hindi
- Label: Zee Music Company

The first promotional song of the film titled "Bandeyaa" was released on 7 September 2015. The music is composed by Amjad-Nadeem, Arko and Badshah. The full audio album released on 1 October 2015 by Zee Music Company.

No.	Title	Lyrics	Music	Singer(s)	Length
1.	"Bandeyaa"	Amjad-Nadeem, Sanjay Gupta	Amjad-Nadeem	Jubin Nautiyal	04:43
2.	"Kahaaniya"	Arko	Arko	Nilofer Wani, Arko	04:03
3.	"Bandeyaa (Reprise)"	Sanjay Gupta	Amjad-Nadeem	Asees Kaur	04:19
4.	"Jaane Tere Shehar"	Arko	Arko	Vipin Aneja	03:39
5.	"Aaj Raat Ka Scene"	Badshah	Badshah	Badshah, Shraddha Pandit	03:30
Total length:					20:13

== Reception ==
=== Critical reception ===
Meena Iyer of The Times of India gave the film 3.5 out of 5 stars and stated "Jazbaa's narrative has pace and power. Aishwarya is rusty at the start but eventually takes charge of the dual aspects of her character. Once in the groove, her eyes breathe fire. Irrfan breezes past with clap-trap Kamlesh Pandey dialogues and Shabana is flawless." Daily News and Analysis rated the film with 3.5 stars out of 5 and commented "What makes Jazbaa a satisfying experience is it's fast-paced, taut and has a run time of two hours, allowing you little time to think. The court-room scenes are brilliant, Aishwarya looks gorgeous and gutted as the scene requires her to be, but it is the supporting cast who lift the film several notches above." Zee News gave a rating of 3.5 stars out of 5 noted "Overall, 'Jazbaa' is compelling and an ensemble that lived up-to its expectation. For Aishwarya –The age-appropriate role was pulled off impeccably and she also showed a few action stunts". Sonia Chopra from Sify gave the film 3.5 out of 5 stars and noted "Despite the story being highly far-fetched, the film is still arresting for its pacy storytelling, actors who perform with conviction, and a few interesting surprises in the finale. Worth a watch!." Filmfare rated 3 stars out of 5, praised the performances of all the actors and noted "The film steams up some good thrills and then throws a bucket full of sentimentality over them and douses them out. Aishwarya performance as a confident lawyer but vulnerable mother is fantastic." The Guardian also gave the film 3 stars, and mentioned "For all the rot Gupta dwells on, there's something refreshing about Jazbaa within the wider Bollywood context: it'll make for brisk, pacy, adult entertainment."

Bollywood Hungama gave it 3 stars, stating "Aishwarya Rai Bachchan with her 'initially-rusty-later spellbinding' performance, carries the film on her shoulders. On the whole, JAZBAA is a captivating thriller with good performances that make it a decent one-time watch." Mid-Day rated 3 stars and noted "Sanjay Gupta had gone a little easy on the unnecessary and intrusive melodrama. Even then, it's a good one time watch for sure. Aishwarya Rai Bachchan perfectly looks the part and even does a fairly decent job, barring certain emotional scenes where she clearly goes over the top." Writing for Hindustan Times, Rohit Vats gave a rating of 3 stated, "The film is a well paced thriller, but primary characters' penchant for invoking whistles dilutes the thrill to some extent. Aishwarya Rai and Irrfan will take you to a new territory and then keep you there for most of its 130-minute duration. Jazbaa is a good watch this weekend." Gayatri Gauri from Firstpost said "The screenplay moves fast in a gripping enough thriller mode. Gupta displays his old penchant for slick action and weaves a fairly engrossing tale." IANS gave the film 3.5 stars commented that "With ample thrill and entertainment, this one is a good weekend watch. Aishwarya, seen on screen after a long hiatus, has a pivotal role, which she dons to perfection. However, the picture-perfect designing of the film is over-egged, giving the film a glossy, albeit, synthetic and unreal look." Subhash K. Jha said that "It's a hardhitting unconstitutional message, packaged and projected with a precarious panache peculiar to Sanjay Gupta's cinema. The shared moments between Aishwarya and Shabana Azmi are a marvel to behold."

On the contrary, Shomini Sen from CNN-IBN criticised the film for its melodramatic, high pitched and unintentionally funny dialogues and wrote "Jazbaa scores only because of the performances. Aishwarya Rai grunts and screeches on some scenes but manages to deliver a convincing performance." Ananya Bhattacharya writing for India Today gave 2.5 stars criticized Gupta's direction and wrote "The problem with Jazbaa lies in the overdose of melodrama and dialogues that make your ears bleed. One aspect that works in favour of the film is Jazbaa does raise some pertinent questions about the way justice is (un)delivered in the country. Watch Jazbaa for the performances." Saibal Chatterjee from NDTV gave the film 2.5 out of 5 stars and stated "Jazbaa is a slick production all right and it does deliver a few thrilling moments and an above-average climax. Overall, Jazbaa feels like a wasted effort, a clear case of superficial style triumphing over substance by a fair distance. But it has just enough for Aishwarya Rai Bachchan fans to justify a trip to the multiplexes." Sukanya Verma of Rediff gave 2 stars and described the film as "A mostly watchable thriller marred by its director Sanjay Gupta's penchant for excesses."

=== Box office ===
The film collected ₹42.3 million (US$440,000) nett on its first day. The first weekend collection stand at ₹152 million (US$1.6 million) nett.

The film grossed around $1.2 million (₹ 78.1 million) in its opening weekend at International Markets.

In its lifetime, Jazbaa grossed between ₹33.19– 429 million.
