= Aur Pyaar Ho Gaya =

1997 Indian film by Rahul Rawail

Aur Pyar Ho Gaya
- Theatrical release poster
- Directed by: Rahul Rawail
- Screenplay by: Honey Irani
- Dialogues by: Rumi Jaffery
- Story by: Rumi Jaffery
- Produced by: Sohel Maklai
- Starring: Bobby Deol; Aishwarya Rai; Shammi Kapoor; Anupam Kher; Beena; Shammi
- Cinematography: Manmohan Singh
- Edited by: Mukund Chowdhary
- Music by: Songs: Nusrat Fateh Ali Khan; Score: Amar Haldipur
- Production company: Eros International
- Distributed by: Bharat Shah
- Release date: 15 August 1997
- Running time: 153 minutes
- Country: India
- Language: Hindi
- Budget: ₹6.25 crore
- Box office: ₹13.85 crore

Aur Pyar Ho Gaya (transl. And Love Happened) is a 1997 Indian Hindi-language romantic drama film directed by Rahul Rawail. A remake of Prosenjit Chatterjee and Juhi Chawla starrer Bengali film Amar Prem (1989), it stars Bobby Deol and Aishwarya Rai as the main leads, supported by Shammi Kapoor, Anupam Kher, Beena and Shammi This film marked Rai's debut in the Hindi film industry. The film's music was composed by Nusrat Fateh Ali Khan, who also makes a cameo appearance in the film. He died only a day after the film's release.

== Plot ==
Ashi is a free-spirited young woman who was born and raised in India. Her parents set her up for an arranged marriage with Rohit Malhotra, the son of a friend of Ashi’s parents, and someone who Ashi has never met. To help the two get to know one another before getting married, Ashi leaves India for Switzerland where Rohit is.

While she is there, she learns that Rohit is away on an emergency business meeting and nobody can say exactly when he is to return. and in the meanwhile she meets a man called Bobby, who is smitten by her beauty and strikes a friendship with her. He soon finds out from her that she is frustrated in her failed attempt to meet Rohit. After a week, Bobby cannot help himself as his heart pines for her. So he disguises himself and meets her as the Rohit she has been waiting for all these months.

Ashi is happy that at last, she gets a chance to meet Rohit before marriage and after a few more weeks, Ashi begins to like this new character. But she then finds out from Rohit's accomplices that Rohit is still on his trip and therefore, Bobby's real identity. This doesn't bother her as she is already in love with Bobby and is ready to move on from Rohit.

Upon their return to India, Ashi explains to her family that she met Bobby instead of Rohit and wants to marry Bobby, not Rohit. Ashi's family are at first, reluctant but after a few weeks, Bobby's family comes with a marriage proposal for Ashi.

As the two families meet and agree for the preparations of their marriage, Bobby's mother introduces herself as the manager of the Bank with which Ashi’s father (Kailashnath) is involved in an on-going fraud/embezzlement case.

In the months leading up to the wedding, Kailashnath is summoned to appear in Court during which Bobby's mother testifies that Kailashnath is one of the perpetrators. Kailashnath immediately and furiously cancels his daughter Ashi's wedding to Bobby. Furthermore, he arranges Ashi's marriage to Rohit. However, after an unexpected reveal, the story ends happily with Ashi marrying Bobby, and not Rohit.

== Cast ==
- Shammi Kapoor as Ashi's Grandfather
- Bobby Deol as Bobby Oberoi, Ashi's boyfriend.
- Aishwarya Rai as Ashi Kapoor, Bobby's girlfriend.
- Anupam Kher as Kailashnath Kapoor, Ashi's father.
- Beena as Gayatri Oberoi, Bobby's mother.
- Shammi as Ashi's Grandmother
- Avtar Gill as Mr. Malhotra
- Priya Tendulkar as Mrs. Malhotra
- Aashif Sheikh as Rohit Malhotra
- Sunny Deol as himself (cameo appearance)
- Nusrat Fateh Ali Khan as himself (special appearance)

== Music and soundtrack ==
The music for the songs of the movie was composed by Nusrat Fateh Ali Khan and the lyrics were penned by Javed Akhtar. The background score of the film was done by Amar Haldipur.

#	Title	Singer(s)	Duration
1	"Meri Saanson Mein" (Male)	Udit Narayan	07:39
2	"Meri Saanson Mein" (Female)	Alka Yagnik	07:32
3	"Ek Din Kahin Do Tum Milein"	Sonu Nigam	07:04
5	"Humse Rahoge Kya Hamesha Khafa"	Sonu Nigam	05:25
4	"Jaagi Hui Fizayein"	Udit Narayan, Asha Bhosle	06:30
6	"Sitaara Aankhein"	Udit Narayan	05:08
7	"Koi Jaane Koi Na Jaane"	Udit Narayan, Nusrat Fateh Ali Khan, Anuradha Paudwal	05:38
9	"Thoda Sa Pagla Thoda Siyaana"	Asha Bhosle	05:37
8	"Uttar Dakshin Poorab Pashchim"	Sonu Nigam, Alka Yagnik	06:12
10	"Zindagi Jhoom Kar"	Nusrat Fateh Ali Khan	04:52

== Reception ==
=== Box office ===
According to Box Office India the film earned ₹ 13.85 crore worldwide and was labelled a "box office flop". India Today wrote that "the film, sold for a record ₹ 2 crore, is a heavily losing proposition - distributors stand to lose upward of ₹ 50 lakh."

=== Critical response ===
India Today wrote, "Aur Pyar Ho Gaya is like a Chopra film having a bad day. Missing are the deft storytelling skills and lovely music. Rawail's film, despite the heavyweight brand names (music: Nusrat Fateh Ali Khan) is a laboured love story."

=== Awards ===
- Won - Star Screen Award Most Promising Newcomer - Female - Aishwarya Rai
