= Raincoat (film) =

2004 Indian film by Rituparno Ghosh

- Theatrical release poster
- Directed by: Rituparno Ghosh
- Written by: Rituparno Ghosh
- Based on: The Gift of the Magi by O. Henry
- Produced by: Shree Venkatesh Films
- Starring: Ajay Devgn; Aishwarya Rai; Annu Kapoor; Mouli Ganguly; Surekha Sikri
- Cinematography: Avik Mukhopadhyay
- Edited by: Arghakamal Mitra
- Music by: Debojyoti Mishra
- Distributed by: Shree Venkatesh Films
- Release date: 24 December 2004
- Running time: 120 minutes
- Country: India
- Language: Hindi
- Budget: ₹50 million
- Box office: ₹48.76 million

Raincoat is a 2004 Indian Hindi-language romantic drama film directed by Rituparno Ghosh, starring Ajay Devgn and Aishwarya Rai. Adapted from The Gift of the Magi, it tells the story of two lovers, separated by destiny, who meet again one day. This encounter allows each to realize the truth about the lives they are living.

The shooting for the film was completed in only 16 days. The film won the National Film Award for Best Feature Film in Hindi, and Aishwarya Rai was nominated for the Filmfare Award for Best Actress. The film was unofficially remade in Tamil as Gnabagangal (2009).

== Plot ==
Manoj, an unemployed man from Bhagalpur, travels to Kolkata in search of financial help after deciding to start a business. He stays with his friends Alok, a successful television producer, and his wife Sheela. Alok suggests asking Manoj's former classmates for money through letters, but Manoj, embarrassed by the idea, instead decides to seek help in person. While planning his visits, he learns that one of the addresses belongs to Neerja, the woman he was once engaged to marry before she wed someone else.

Armed with a list of contacts, a mobile phone, and a raincoat provided by his friends, Manoj spends the day collecting donations and eventually raises ₹12,000. He then visits Neerja, who warmly welcomes him into her home while sheltering from heavy rain. Although she claims to be happily married and living comfortably, Manoj notices signs of her anxiety and isolation. Both conceal the truth about their lives: Manoj falsely presents himself as a wealthy television producer, while Neerja insists that her husband is successful and that their affluent lifestyle is genuine.

As they reminisce about the past, Manoj recalls how devastated he was when Neerja's marriage was arranged. Neerja, meanwhile, grows jealous after overhearing a phone call from Sheela, whom Manoj claims is his secretary. She leaves the house to buy him food, insisting he remain inside. During her absence, Manoj encounters the landlord, who reveals that Neerja and her husband are actually in severe financial difficulty. Her husband lost his job after being defrauded and has since turned to fraudulent schemes, leaving the couple unable to pay their rent. Neerja's fear of opening the door stems not from burglars but from creditors and eviction. Moved by her situation, Manoj gives the landlord the ₹12,000 he had collected to cover three months' rent and asks him to delay any eviction proceedings.

Before leaving, Manoj writes Neerja a letter explaining that he has learned the truth and would have helped her regardless, had they married. He hides the letter beneath a sofa cover. When Neerja returns, the two continue pretending that their lives are prosperous while quietly acknowledging their lingering affection. Manoj eventually departs without revealing his own financial struggles.

Back at Alok and Sheela's home, Manoj admits he no longer has the money he collected, frustrating Alok. Later, Sheela gives him an envelope she discovered in the pocket of the raincoat. Inside are Neerja's gold bangles and a letter revealing that she had found the appeal letter describing Manoj's financial hardship. She gently rebukes him for hiding the truth and offers her jewelry to help him, writing that, had they been married, he would never have refused her support.

== Cast ==
- Ajay Devgn as Manoj "Mannu" Tripathi
- Aishwarya Rai as Neerja "Neeru"
- Surekha Sikri as Mrs. Tripathi (Mannu's mother)
- Annu Kapoor as Landlord
- Sameer Dharmadhikari as Alok (Mannu's friend)
- Mouli Ganguly Sheila
- Gulzar as poet (voice)

== Soundtrack ==
Debajyoti Mishra experimented with the music of the film. The songs are all background numbers. Classical singer Shubha Mudgal provided her voice for the title track.

Raincoat

Soundtrack album by Debojyoti Mishra
- Released: 2004
- Recorded: 2004
- Studio: Shree Venkatesh Films
- Genre: Film soundtrack

All music is composed by Debojyoti Mishra.

No.	Title	Lyrics	Singer	Length
1.	"Piya Tora Kaisa Abhiman" (Female)	Gulzar	Shubha Mudgal	2:40
2.	"Mathura Nagarpati"	Rituparno Ghosh	Shubha Mudgal	2:33
3.	"Raha Dekhe"	Rituparno Ghosh	Shubha Mudgal	2:30
4.	"Hamari Galiyan Hoke Aana"	Rituparno Ghosh	Meena Mishra	1:41
5.	"Piya Tora Kaisa Abhiman" (Male)	Gulzar	Hariharan
6.	"Piya Tora Kaisa Abhiman" (Film version)	Gulzar	Raghab Chatterjee
7.	"Akele Hum Nadiya Kinare"	Rituparno Ghosh	Shubha Mudgal	2:06
8.	"Jug Jiye"	Rituparno Ghosh	Meena Mishra
9.	"Humari Galiyan Hoke Aana" (Sad)	Rituparno Ghosh	Meena Mishra

== Reception ==
=== Critical response ===
The Times of India gave a three stars out of five. Rediff cited "Some films attempt to showcase a series of wonderful moments and tend to go overboard. Raincoat captures just one poignant moment and tells it as simply it can, leaving you with a wow. For someone heralded as the most beautiful woman in the world, Aishwarya Rai looks terrifyingly depressing in the film. Her Neeru looks cynical to the point of suicide. And that's a compliment. Her body language is a strange mix of a passive housewife and a passionate girlfriend. Though the effort to sound rustic shows, the restraint in her dialogue delivery and performance is commendable. Hesitation, desperation, humiliation -- Ajay Devgan conveys them eloquently. He particularly stands out in the scenes where he cries in the bathroom, or begs Neeru not to marry someone else".

The Hindu stated "Raincoat... essentially a chamber piece, it weaves a narrative with just two characters in most of the frames. Raincoat can easily be Aishwarya Rai's best performance, and as Neerja, the former beauty queen appears to have shed her inhibitions about looking unglamorous. In fact, most of time, Rai looks quite plain. What is more, she seems to have made an earnest effort to emote, using less of her body and limbs and more of her face, and eyes in particular. Ajay Devagan as Manoj is Devagan, as we have seen him in an umpteen number of parts earlier, although Ghosh draws the actor out of a certain woodenness that he is known for".

Taran Adarsh of Bollywood Hungama said "On the whole, Raincoat will appeal to a handful of critics and connoisseurs of art house cinema who'll heap lavish praises/lustrous words, but from the box-office point of view, Raincoat will face stormy weather at the ticket window".

Derek Elley from Variety described it as "Raincoat is a chamber-sized gem. Melancholic, rainy afternoon drama, almost entirely set in a single house, features meaty roles for two of Indian cinema's biggest stars, Aishwarya Rai and Ajay Devgan, in very different guises from their usual Bollywood ones. Though pic is unlikely to score big locally when it goes out in August against more commercial heavy-hitters like Swades and The Rising, Raincoat could build a solid rep at fests, with some pickups by specialized webs and niche distribs. As in Ghosh's previous pic, "Chokher Bali: A Passion Play" (2003), Rai reveals herself as a considerable actress given the right script and direction, far from the comic-romantic roles in most of her Bollywood productions. Shunning her usual immaculate makeup and duds, and looking more like a broken, malfunctioning doll, she makes Niru a mixture of child and temptress/charmer, driven by capricious moods and clearly unhappy inside. It's the showier of the two perfs, but Devgan, in ultra low-key mode, is equally impressive, especially in the latter stages as his great love for the woman he once knew reveals itself in an act of charity".

=== Box office ===
Raincoat grossed ₹48.76 million worldwide. The film was a commercial failure at the box-office.

== Accolades ==
Year	Award	Category	Recipient(s)	Result
2004	Karlovy Vary International Film Festival	Crystal Globe	Rituparno Ghosh	Nominated
2005	National Film Awards	Best Feature Film in Hindi	Rituparno Ghosh & Shree Venkatesh Films	Won
2005	Filmfare Awards	Best Actress	Aishwarya Rai	Nominated
2005	Screen Awards	Best Actress	Aishwarya Rai	Nominated
2005	Zee Cine Awards	Best Actress (Critics)	Aishwarya Rai	Won
