= Bunty Aur Babli =

2005 Indian film by Shaad Ali

- Theatrical release poster
- Directed by: Shaad Ali
- Written by: Jaideep Sahni
- Story by: Aditya Chopra
- Produced by: Aditya Chopra
- Starring: Amitabh Bachchan; Abhishek Bachchan; Rani Mukerji
- Narrated by: Amitabh Bachchan
- Cinematography: Avik Mukhopadhyay
- Edited by: Ritesh Soni
- Music by: Shankar–Ehsaan–Loy
- Production company: Yash Raj Films
- Distributed by: Yash Raj Films
- Release date: May 27, 2005 (India)
- Running time: 177 minutes
- Country: India
- Language: Hindi
- Box office: ₹63.20 crore

Bunty Aur Babli (Bunty and Babli) is a 2005 Indian Hindi-language crime comedy film directed by Shaad Ali, written by Jaideep Sahni and produced by Aditya Chopra and Yash Chopra under Yash Raj Films. The film stars real-life father-son duo Amitabh Bachchan and Abhishek Bachchan in their first film collaboration with the former as a police officer while the latter and Rani Mukerji star as the titular protagonists, with Amitabh Bachchan, Puneet Issar, Pratima Kazmi and Sanjay Mishra among others in a supporting roles. Largely inspired by the 1967 American film Bonnie and Clyde, it follows Fursatganj-based Rakesh Trivedi and Pankinagar-based Vimmi Saluja who run away from their respective homes and, pushed by their failures, transform into con artists, little aware that JCP Dashrath Singh has been tailing them.

Bunty Aur Babli was theatrically released on 27 May 2005, and received positive reviews from critics who praised the direction, screenplay, costumes, music, and lead performances. The film emerged as a major commercial success, grossing ₹904 million (US$11 million) worldwide, and became the second highest-grossing Indian film of the year.

At the 51st Filmfare Awards, the film received eight nominations, including Best Film, Best Actor (Abhishek Bachchan), Best Actress (Mukerji), and Best Supporting Actor (Amitabh Bachchan), winning three: Best Music Director (Shankar–Ehsaan–Loy), Best Lyricist (Gulzar), and Best Female Playback Singer (Alisha Chinai), the latter two for the song "Kajra Re".

The film was later remade in Telugu as Bhale Dongalu (2008). Its sequel, Bunty Aur Babli 2 was released theatrically on 19 November 2021. Mukerji reprised her role with Saif Ali Khan replacing Abhishek Bachchan. Siddhant Chaturvedi and Sharvari Wagh joined as a new pair of con artists.

== Plot ==
Rakesh Trivedi is an aspiring entrepreneur from the small town of Fursatgunj in Uttar Pradesh who wants to build his own business and wishes to try his luck in the city, but is under pressure from his ticket examiner father Chandra Prakash Trivedi to apply for a government job in the railways. Extremely unwilling to follow into Chandra's footsteps, he runs away one day hoping to reach Mumbai. Elsewhere, in the fictional town of Pankinagar in Punjab, Vimmi Saluja harbours dreams of becoming a fashion designer but is constantly under pressure from her family for marriage. Seeking to avoid any more prospective suitors, she too runs away, hoping to display her talent in Mumbai. However, at one point, Rakesh's attempts to sell his business ideas to a client go awry when he learns that the prospect he discussed his plan outside with, Q. Q. Qureshi, had already pitched it and obtained approval. Vimmi too is unsuccessful, and she and Rakesh meet each other, sharing their respective failures. Determined to avenge Mehmood, Rakesh plans an elaborate job with help from Vimmi and successfully dupes Qureshi. The runaway success prompts them to turn into con artists, and they adopt the aliases "Bunty" and "Babli", embarking on a series of adventures, eventually attracting national attention. As time passes, they decide to get married and continue as husband and wife.

Meanwhile, JCP Dashrath Singh has slowly been catching up with them, and finally, at one point, he manages to get dangerously close to the couple. After one of their jobs ends in Dashrath issuing orders against them and engaging the forces in an active lockdown to prevent them from escaping, Rakesh and Vimmi, who by this time has become pregnant and given birth to a baby boy, try to run away and successfully board a train. Enroute, Vimmi contemplates the lifestyle they have chosen and the impact this will have on their son, while an initially ignorant Rakesh finally recognizes the potential perils of engaging in such a dangerous career. They mutually decide to leave their life of crime behind, but Rakesh is caught by Dashrath the next morning, leaving him and Vimmi with no choice but to accompany the officer.

Dashrath listens to their entire story and realizes their pleas to turn over a new leaf are genuine. He decides to let them go, certain that he has destroyed "Bunty" and "Babli" as outlaws. The couple moves back to the Trivedi household in Fursatganj, living a content life with stable jobs. Sometime later, Dashrath approaches them with an offer to help bust crime, seeking to pull them out of their rut by re–enabling their "Bunty" and "Babli" personas.

== Cast ==
- Amitabh Bachchan as JCP Dashrath Singh
- Abhishek Bachchan as Rakesh Trivedi / Bunty
- Rani Mukerji as Vimmi Saluja / Babli
- Raj Babbar as T. T. Chandra Prakash Trivedi, Bunty's father
- Talluri Rameswari as Mrs. Trivedi, Bunty's mother
- Puneet Issar as Mr. Saluja, Babli's father
- Kiran Juneja as Mrs. Saluja, Babli's mother
- Pratima Kazmi as Phool Sakhi
- Prem Chopra as the Sikh Truck Driver
- Rajesh Vivek Upadhyay as Protestor
- Ranjeet Bedi as Showroom Manager
- Ravi Baswani as Hotel Owner in Mussoorie
- Sanjay Mishra as Q. Q. Qureshi
- Virendra Saxena as Police Commissioner
- Yunus Parvez as Hotel Owner
- Anupam Shyam as Raj Kapoor Tiwari
- Brijendra Kala as Mehmood Bilal
- J. Brandon Hill as Harry Epstein
- Lilliput as a trumpet player
- Aishwarya Rai Bachchan as a bar dancer in the song 'Kajra Re' (special appearance)

== Production ==
=== Development ===
The narrative was loosely inspired by the 1967 American film Bonnie and Clyde, though adapted into a distinctly Indian setting.

To portray the character of Rakesh "Bunty" Trivedi, Abhishek Bachchan underwent a significant physical transformation, reportedly losing around 12 kilograms.

=== Casting ===
Hrithik Roshan was offered the role of Bunty. However, after he rejected the role, Abhishek Bachchan was cast.

== Reception ==
=== Box office ===
Bunty Aur Babli grossed approximately ₹904 million (US$11 million) worldwide, making it the second highest-grossing Indian film of the year, behind No Entry.

=== Critical response ===
Bunty Aur Babli received generally positive reviews from critics. Jaspreet Pandohar of the BBC calls the film having "more energy than a dozen Duracell bunnies" and notes the lack of screen time for the pair.

== Soundtrack ==
Bunty Aur Babli

Soundtrack album by Shankar–Ehsaan–Loy
- Released: 15 April 2005 (India)
- Recorded: 2004
- Genre: Feature film soundtrack
- Length: 37:09
- Label: Yash Raj Music
- Producers: Yash Chopra; Aditya Chopra

Shankar–Ehsaan–Loy chronology
Phir Milenge (2004)	Bunty Aur Babli (2005)	Dil Jo Bhi Kahey... (2005)

Singles from Bunty Aur Babli
- 1. "Kajra Re" Released: 2005

The soundtrack for Bunty Aur Babli was composed by the musical trio Shankar–Ehsaan–Loy, with lyrics by Gulzar and Blaaze. It was released on 15 April 2005 under the Yash Raj Music label. Initially, A. R. Rahman was approached to compose the music, having previously collaborated with director Shaad Ali on Saathiya (2002), but he declined due to scheduling conflicts.

The album featured energetic dance numbers and romantic tracks, performed onscreen by lead actors Abhishek Bachchan and Rani Mukerji. The song "Kajra Re", featuring Aishwarya Rai in a special appearance alongside the Bachchans, became a major hit and was especially praised for its choreography and visual appeal.

According to Box Office India, the soundtrack sold approximately 1.9 million units, making it the second highest-selling Hindi film album of 2005.

=== Track listing ===
Lyrics by Gulzar except where noted.

No.	Title	Singer(s)	Length
1.	"Dhadak Dhadak"	Udit Narayan, Sunidhi Chauhan, Nihira Joshi	6:33
2.	"Chup Chup Ke"	Sonu Nigam, Mahalakshmi Iyer	7:13
3.	"Nach Baliye"	Shankar Mahadevan, Sowmya Raoh, Loy Mendonsa	6:02
4.	"Bunty Aur Babli"	Sukhwinder Singh, Jaspinder Narula	5:42
5.	"B N B (Lyrics by Blaaze)"	Shankar Mahadevan, Blaaze, Loy Mendonsa	3:38
6.	"Kajra Re"	Alisha Chinai, Shankar Mahadevan, Javed Ali	8:02
Total length:			37:09

=== Reception ===
The music of Bunty Aur Babli received widespread acclaim from critics, who praised its originality, energy, and lyrical composition. Sukanya Verma of Rediff.com described the album as "over-the-top, uninhibited, rustic and teasing," calling it “one helluva musical masala.”

Joginder Tuteja of Bollywood Hungama noted the departure from traditional Yash Raj musical stylings, writing, “Bunty Aur Babli does not contain your routine Yash Chopra genre of music choreographed around the meadows and Swiss Alps. They are more of situational rhythmic tracks that take a story forward.”

Glamsham highlighted the contribution of lyricist Gulzar, noting, “Throughout this zany, zingy and zippy album, the 70-year-old Gulzar imbues a youthfulness that comes from being young at heart... You can't miss its zest for life or its lunge towards a luscious nirvana obtained from looking at life through rose-tinted glasses.”

== Accolades ==
List of accolades received by Bunty Aur Babli
Accolades
Award	Won	Nominated
Bollywood Movie Awards	4	5
Filmfare Awards	3	8
International Indian Film Academy Awards	4	7
MTV Immies	3	3
Producers Guild Film Awards	4	4
Screen Awards	3	6
Zee Cine Awards	4	16
- Total number of awards and nominations (Note: Awards in certain categories do not have prior nominations and only winners are announced by the jury. For simplification and to avoid errors, each award in this list has been presumed to have had a prior nomination.)
Totals	25	49
- References

Award (Note: Awards, festivals and organizations are in alphabetical order.)	Date of ceremony (Note: Date is linked to the article about the awards held that year, wherever possible.)	Category	Recipient(s)	Result	Ref.
Bollywood Movie Awards	10 June 2006	Best Director	Shaad Ali	Nominated	
Bollywood Movie Awards	10 June 2006	Best Actor in a Comic Role	Abhishek Bachchan	Won	
Bollywood Movie Awards	10 June 2006	Best Music Director	Shankar–Ehsaan–Loy	Won	
Bollywood Movie Awards	10 June 2006	Best Female Playback Singer	Alisha Chinai – (for song "Kajra Re")	Won	
Bollywood Movie Awards	10 June 2006	Best Choreography	Vaibhavi Merchant – (for song "Kajra Re")	Won	
Filmfare Awards	25 February 2006	Best Film	Aditya Chopra	Nominated	
Filmfare Awards	25 February 2006	Best Actor	Abhishek Bachchan	Nominated	
Filmfare Awards	25 February 2006	Best Actress	Rani Mukerji	Nominated	
Filmfare Awards	25 February 2006	Best Supporting Actor	Amitabh Bachchan	Nominated	
Filmfare Awards	25 February 2006	Best Music Director	Shankar–Ehsaan–Loy	Won	
Filmfare Awards	25 February 2006	Best Lyricist	Gulzar – (for song "Kajra Re")	Won	
Filmfare Awards	25 February 2006	Best Lyricist	Gulzar – (for song "Chup Chup Ke")	Nominated	
Filmfare Awards	25 February 2006	Best Female Playback Singer	Alisha Chinai – (for song "Kajra Re")	Won	
International Indian Film Academy Awards	15–17 June 2006	Best Film	Aditya Chopra	Nominated	
International Indian Film Academy Awards	15–17 June 2006	Best Actress	Rani Mukerji	Nominated	
International Indian Film Academy Awards	15–17 June 2006	Best Supporting Actor	Amitabh Bachchan	Nominated	
International Indian Film Academy Awards	15–17 June 2006	Best Music Director	Shankar–Ehsaan–Loy	Won	
International Indian Film Academy Awards	15–17 June 2006	Best Lyricist	Gulzar – (for song "Kajra Re")	Won	
International Indian Film Academy Awards	15–17 June 2006	Best Female Playback Singer	Alisha Chinai – (for song "Kajra Re")	Won	
International Indian Film Academy Awards	15–17 June 2006	Best Choreography	Vaibhavi Merchant – (for song "Kajra Re")	Won	
MTV Immies	9 December 2005	Best Film Album	Bunty Aur Babli	Won	
MTV Immies	9 December 2005	Best Female Playback Singer	Alisha Chinai – (for song "Kajra Re")	Won	
MTV Immies	9 December 2005	Best Performance In a Song – Female	Aishwarya Rai Bachchan – (for song "Kajra Re")	Won	
Producers Guild Film Awards	21 January 2006	Best Music Director	Shankar–Ehsaan–Loy	Won	
Producers Guild Film Awards	21 January 2006	Best Lyricist	Gulzar – (for song "Kajra Re")	Won	
Producers Guild Film Awards	21 January 2006	Best Female Playback Singer	Alisha Chinai – (for song "Kajra Re")	Won	
Producers Guild Film Awards	21 January 2006	Best Choreography	Vaibhavi Merchant – (for song "Kajra Re")	Won	
Screen Awards	11 January 2006	Best Supporting Actor	Amitabh Bachchan	Nominated	
Screen Awards	11 January 2006	Best Actor in a Comic Role	Abhishek Bachchan	Won	
Screen Awards	11 January 2006	Best Music Director	Shankar–Ehsaan–Loy	Won	
Screen Awards	11 January 2006	Best Female Playback Singer	Alisha Chinai – (for song "Kajra Re")	Nominated	
Screen Awards	11 January 2006	Best Choreography	Vaibhavi Merchant – (for song "Kajra Re")	Nominated	
Screen Awards	11 January 2006	Jodi No. 1	Abhishek Bachchan & Rani Mukerji	Won	
Zee Cine Awards	4 March 2006	Best Film	Aditya Chopra	Nominated	
Zee Cine Awards	4 March 2006	Best Director	Shaad Ali	Nominated	
Zee Cine Awards	4 March 2006	Best Actor – Male	Abhishek Bachchan	Nominated	
Zee Cine Awards	4 March 2006	Best Actor – Female	Rani Mukerji	Nominated	
Zee Cine Awards	4 March 2006	Best Actor in a Supporting Role – Male	Amitabh Bachchan	Nominated	
Zee Cine Awards	4 March 2006	Best Music Director	Shankar–Ehsaan–Loy	Won	
Zee Cine Awards	4 March 2006	Best Lyricist	Gulzar – (for song "Kajra Re")	Nominated	
Zee Cine Awards	4 March 2006	Best Female Playback Singer	Alisha Chinai – (for song "Kajra Re")	Nominated	
Zee Cine Awards	4 March 2006	Best Choreography	Vaibhavi Merchant – (for song "Kajra Re")	Won	
Zee Cine Awards	4 March 2006	Best Choreography	Shiamak Davar – (for song "Nach Baliye")	Nominated	
Zee Cine Awards	4 March 2006	Best Track of the Year	"Kajra Re"	Won	
Zee Cine Awards	4 March 2006	Best Costume Design	Aki Narula	Nominated	
Zee Cine Awards	4 March 2006	Best Art Direction	Sharmishta Roy	Nominated	
Zee Cine Awards	4 March 2006	Best Song Recording	Empire Studio	Won	
Zee Cine Awards	4 March 2006	Best Film Processing	Adlabs Films	Nominated	
Zee Cine Awards	4 March 2006	Best Publicity	Design Cell	Nominated	

== Sequel ==
In December 2019, Yash Raj Films announced a sequel titled Bunty Aur Babli 2, directed by Varun V. Sharma and produced by Aditya Chopra. The film starred Saif Ali Khan and Rani Mukerji as the original Bunty and Babli, alongside Siddhant Chaturvedi and debutante Sharvari Wagh as a new con duo who adopt the notorious aliases. Initially scheduled for release on 26 June 2020, the film was delayed due to the COVID-19 pandemic and was eventually released theatrically on 19 November 2021.

The character of Bunty was portrayed by Khan, replacing Abhishek Bachchan. The sequel received mostly negative reviews from critics and underperformed at the box office.

== Legacy ==
Bunty Aur Babli was remade in Telugu as Bhale Dongalu in 2008, starring Tarun, Ileana D'Cruz, and Jagapathi Babu. In 2013, Time Out placed the film at number 63 in its list of “The 100 Best Bollywood Movies.”
