= List of accolades received by Kabhi Alvida Naa Kehna =

Kabhi Alvida Naa Kehna awards and nominations
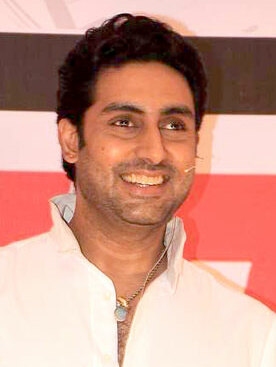
- Abhishek Bachchan garnered several awards and nominations for his performances in Kabhi Alvida Naa Kehna, including his third consecutive win for the Filmfare Award for Best Supporting Actor.
Awards and nominations
Award	Wins	Nominations
Bollywood Movie Awards	3	10
Filmfare Awards	1	23
Global Indian Film Awards	2	13
International Indian Film Academy Awards	1	9
People's Choice Awards India	1	2
Screen Awards	1	8
Stardust Awards	1	6
Zee Cine Awards	5	26

Totals (Note: Certain award groups do not simply award one winner. They acknowledge several different recipients, have runners-up, and have third place. Since this is a specific recognition and is different from losing an award, runner-up mentions are considered wins in this award tally. For simplification and to avoid errors, each award in this list has been presumed to have had a prior nomination.)
- Wins: 15
- Nominations: 97

Kabhi Alvida Naa Kehna (transl. Never Say Goodbye), also abbreviated as KANK, is a 2006 Indian Hindi-language musical romantic drama written and directed by Karan Johar and produced by his mother Hiroo Yash Johar, in her debut, under the Dharma Productions banner. The film stars Amitabh Bachchan, Shah Rukh Khan, Abhishek Bachchan, Rani Mukerji, Preity Zinta and Kirron Kher. The film explores themes of marital infidelity and dysfunctional relationships. The film was promoted with the tag-line "A Love... That Broke All Relationships".

Set and mostly taking place in New York City, the cinematography of the film was done by Anil Mehta, and Khan acted as the film's narrator. Shankar–Ehsaan–Loy composed the music while the lyrics were penned by Javed Akhtar. Kabhi Alvida Naa Kehna was a major commercial success in India, becoming the fourth highest-grossing film of the year. It emerged as the highest-grossing Indian film of all time in overseas at the time of its release, grossing a worldwide total of ₹1.13 billion ($37 million).

A recipient of several accolades, Kabhi Alvida Naa Kehna led the 52nd Filmfare Awards with 23 nominations, including Best Film, Best Director (Johar), Best Actor (Khan), Best Actress (Mukerji), Best Supporting Actor (Bachchan Sr.) and Best Supporting Actress (Zinta), and won Best Supporting Actor (Bachchan Jr.). At the 8th IIFA Awards, the film received 9 nominations, including Best Film, Best Director (Johar) and Best Supporting Actor (Bachchan Jr. and Sr.), and won Best Actress (Mukerji). Kabhi Alvida Naa Kehna also earned two Global Indian Film Awards, one People's Choice Awards India, one Screen Award, one Stardust Award, and five Zee Cine Awards.

== Awards and nominations ==
Award (Note: Awards, festivals and organizations are in alphabetical order.)	Date of ceremony (Note: Date is linked to the article about the awards held that year, wherever possible.)	Category	Recipient(s)	Result	Ref.
Bollywood Movie Awards	26 May 2007	Best Film	Kabhi Alvida Naa Kehna	Nominated	
Bollywood Movie Awards	26 May 2007	Best Director	Karan Johar	Nominated	
Bollywood Movie Awards	26 May 2007	Best Actor	Shah Rukh Khan	Nominated	
Bollywood Movie Awards	26 May 2007	Best Actress	Rani Mukerji	Nominated	
Bollywood Movie Awards	26 May 2007	Best Supporting Actor	Abhishek Bachchan	Nominated	
Bollywood Movie Awards	26 May 2007	Best Supporting Actress	Preity Zinta	Nominated	
Bollywood Movie Awards	26 May 2007	Best Music Director	Shankar–Ehsaan–Loy	Won	
Bollywood Movie Awards	26 May 2007	Best Male Playback Singer	Sonu Nigam for "Kabhi Alvida Naa Kehna"	Nominated	
Bollywood Movie Awards	26 May 2007	Best Female Playback Singer	Alka Yagnik for "Kabhi Alvida Naa Kehna"	Won	
Bollywood Movie Awards	26 May 2007	Best Costume Designer	Manish Malhotra	Won	
Filmfare Awards	17 February 2007	Best Film	Kabhi Alvida Naa Kehna	Nominated	
Filmfare Awards	17 February 2007	Best Director	Karan Johar	Nominated	
Filmfare Awards	17 February 2007	Best Story	Karan Johar	Nominated	
Filmfare Awards	17 February 2007	Best Actor	Shah Rukh Khan	Nominated	
Filmfare Awards	17 February 2007	Best Actress	Rani Mukerji	Nominated	
Filmfare Awards	17 February 2007	Best Supporting Actor	Abhishek Bachchan	Won	
Filmfare Awards	17 February 2007	Best Supporting Actor	Amitabh Bachchan	Nominated	
Filmfare Awards	17 February 2007	Best Supporting Actress	Preity Zinta	Nominated	
Filmfare Awards	17 February 2007	Best Music Director	Shankar–Ehsaan–Loy	Nominated	
Filmfare Awards	17 February 2007	Best Background Score	Shankar–Ehsaan–Loy	Nominated	
Filmfare Awards	17 February 2007	Best Lyricist	Javed Akhtar for "Kabhi Alvida Naa Kehna"	Nominated	
Filmfare Awards	17 February 2007	Best Lyricist	Javed Akhtar for "Mitwa"	Nominated	
Filmfare Awards	17 February 2007	Best Male Playback Singer	Sonu Nigam for "Kabhi Alvida Naa Kehna"	Nominated	
Filmfare Awards	17 February 2007	Best Female Playback Singer	Alka Yagnik for "Kabhi Alvida Naa Kehna"	Nominated	
Filmfare Awards	17 February 2007	Best Screenplay	Karan Johar, Shibani Bathija	Nominated	
Filmfare Awards	17 February 2007	Best Dialogue	Niranjan Iyengar	Nominated	
Filmfare Awards	17 February 2007	Best Cinematography	Anil Mehta	Nominated	
Filmfare Awards	17 February 2007	Best Choreography	Farah Khan for "Rock 'N' Roll Soniye"	Nominated	
Filmfare Awards	17 February 2007	Best Choreography	Farah Khan for "Where's The Party Tonight?"	Nominated	
Filmfare Awards	17 February 2007	Best Editing	Sanjay Sankla	Nominated	
Filmfare Awards	17 February 2007	Best Art Direction	Sharmishta Roy	Nominated	
Filmfare Awards	17 February 2007	Best Sound Design	Stephen Gomes	Nominated	
Filmfare Awards	17 February 2007	Best Costume Design	Manish Malhotra	Nominated	
Global Indian Film Awards	7–9 December 2006	Best Film	Kabhi Alvida Naa Kehna	Nominated	
Global Indian Film Awards	7–9 December 2006	Best Director	Karan Johar	Nominated	
Global Indian Film Awards	7–9 December 2006	Best Actor	Shah Rukh Khan	Nominated	
Global Indian Film Awards	7–9 December 2006	Best Actress	Rani Mukerji	Nominated	
Global Indian Film Awards	7–9 December 2006	Best Supporting Actor	Abhishek Bachchan	Won	
Global Indian Film Awards	7–9 December 2006	Best Supporting Actor	Amitabh Bachchan	Nominated	
Global Indian Film Awards	7–9 December 2006	Best Supporting Actress	Preity Zinta	Nominated	
Global Indian Film Awards	7–9 December 2006	Best Music Director	Shankar–Ehsaan–Loy	Nominated	
Global Indian Film Awards	7–9 December 2006	Best Lyricist	Javed Akhtar for "Kabhi Alvida Naa Kehna"	Nominated	
Global Indian Film Awards	7–9 December 2006	Best Male Playback Singer	Shafqat Amanat Ali for Mitwa"	Nominated	
Global Indian Film Awards	7–9 December 2006	Best Male Playback Singer	Sonu Nigam for "Kabhi Alvida Naa Kehna"	Nominated	
Global Indian Film Awards	7–9 December 2006	Best Female Playback Singer	Alka Yagnik for "Kabhi Alvida Naa Kehna"	Won	
Global Indian Film Awards	7–9 December 2006	Best Choreography	Farah Khan for "Where's The Party Tonight?"	Nominated	
International Indian Film Academy Awards	7–9 June 2007	Best Film	Kabhi Alvida Naa Kehna	Nominated	
International Indian Film Academy Awards	7–9 June 2007	Best Director	Karan Johar	Nominated	
International Indian Film Academy Awards	7–9 June 2007	Best Actress	Rani Mukerji	Won	
International Indian Film Academy Awards	7–9 June 2007	Best Supporting Actor	Abhishek Bachchan	Nominated	
International Indian Film Academy Awards	7–9 June 2007	Best Supporting Actor	Amitabh Bachchan	Nominated	
International Indian Film Academy Awards	7–9 June 2007	Best Music Director	Shankar–Ehsaan–Loy	Nominated	
International Indian Film Academy Awards	7–9 June 2007	Best Lyricist	Javed Akhtar for "Kabhi Alvida Naa Kehna"	Nominated	
International Indian Film Academy Awards	7–9 June 2007	Best Male Playback Singer	Sonu Nigam for "Kabhi Alvida Naa Kehna"	Nominated	
International Indian Film Academy Awards	7–9 June 2007	Best Female Playback Singer	Alka Yagnik for "Kabhi Alvida Naa Kehna"	Nominated	
People's Choice Awards India	2007	Best Actress	Rani Mukerji	Nominated	
People's Choice Awards India	2007	Best Supporting Actress	Preity Zinta	Won	
Screen Awards	6 January 2007	Best Supporting Actor	Amitabh Bachchan	Nominated	
Screen Awards	6 January 2007	Best Music Director	Shankar–Ehsaan–Loy	Nominated	
Screen Awards	6 January 2007	Best Lyricist	Javed Akhtar for "Mitwa"	Nominated	
Screen Awards	6 January 2007	Best Male Playback Singer	Shafqat Amanat Ali for "Mitwa"	Nominated	
Screen Awards	6 January 2007	Best Female Playback Singer	Alka Yagnik for "Tumhi Dekho Naa"	Nominated	
Screen Awards	6 January 2007	Best Cinematography	Anil Mehta	Nominated	
Screen Awards	6 January 2007	Best Art Direction	Sharmishta Roy	Nominated	
Screen Awards	6 January 2007	Jodi No. 1	Shah Rukh Khan & Rani Mukerji	Won	
Stardust Awards	18 February 2007	Dream Director	Karan Johar	Nominated	
Stardust Awards	18 February 2007	Star of the Year – Male	Shah Rukh Khan	Nominated	
Stardust Awards	18 February 2007	Star of the Year – Female	Rani Mukerji	Nominated	
Stardust Awards	18 February 2007	Best Supporting Actor	Abhishek Bachchan	Won	
Stardust Awards	18 February 2007	Best Supporting Actor	Amitabh Bachchan	Nominated	
Stardust Awards	18 February 2007	Best Supporting Actress	Preity Zinta	Nominated	
Zee Cine Awards	1 April 2007	Best Film	Kabhi Alvida Naa Kehna	Nominated	
Zee Cine Awards	1 April 2007	Best Director	Karan Johar	Nominated	
Zee Cine Awards	1 April 2007	Best Actor	Shah Rukh Khan	Nominated	
Zee Cine Awards	1 April 2007	Best Actress	Rani Mukerji	Nominated	
Zee Cine Awards	1 April 2007	Best Supporting Actor	Abhishek Bachchan	Won	
Zee Cine Awards	1 April 2007	Best Supporting Actor	Amitabh Bachchan	Nominated	
Zee Cine Awards	1 April 2007	Best Supporting Actress	Preity Zinta	Nominated	
Zee Cine Awards	1 April 2007	Best Music Director	Shankar–Ehsaan–Loy	Nominated	
Zee Cine Awards	1 April 2007	Best Background Score	Shankar–Ehsaan–Loy	Nominated	
Zee Cine Awards	1 April 2007	Best Lyricist	Javed Akhtar for "Mitwa"	Nominated	
Zee Cine Awards	1 April 2007	Best Male Playback Singer	Shafqat Amanat Ali for "Mitwa"	Nominated	
Zee Cine Awards	1 April 2007	Best Male Playback Singer	Sonu Nigam for "Kabhi Alvida Naa Kehna"	Nominated	
Zee Cine Awards	1 April 2007	Best Female Playback Singer	Alka Yagnik for "Tumhi Dekho Naa"	Won	
Zee Cine Awards	1 April 2007	Best Female Playback Singer	Vasundhara Das for "Where's The Party Tonight?"	Nominated	
Zee Cine Awards	1 April 2007	Best Choreography	Farah Khan for "Rock 'N' Roll Soniye"	Nominated	
Zee Cine Awards	1 April 2007	Best Track of the Year	"Kabhi Alvida Naa Kehna"	Nominated	
Zee Cine Awards	1 April 2007	Best Screenplay	Karan Johar, Shibani Bathija	Nominated	
Zee Cine Awards	1 April 2007	Best Dialogue	Niranjan Iyengar	Nominated	
Zee Cine Awards	1 April 2007	Best Cinematography	Anil Mehta	Nominated	
Zee Cine Awards	1 April 2007	Best Costume Design	Manish Malhotra	Nominated	
Zee Cine Awards	1 April 2007	Best Art Direction	Sharmishta Roy	Won	
Zee Cine Awards	1 April 2007	Best Audiography	Stephen Gomes	Nominated	
Zee Cine Awards	1 April 2007	Best Song Recording	Abhay Rumde, Shantanu Mukherjee	Nominated	
Zee Cine Awards	1 April 2007	Best Special Effects (Visual)	Shaikh Rizwan	Nominated	
Zee Cine Awards	1 April 2007	Best Publicity Design	H. R. Enterprises	Won	
Zee Cine Awards	1 April 2007	Best Film Processing	Adlabs Films	Won	
