= 2007 Zee Cine Awards =

Awards for Hindi-language films of 2006

10th Zee Cine Awards
- Date: 1 April 2007
- Site: Genting Highlands, Malaysia
- Hosted by: Karan Johar

Highlights
- Best Picture: Rang De Basanti
- Best Direction: Rakeysh Omprakash Mehra (Rang De Basanti)
- Best Actor: Hrithik Roshan (Krrish)
- Best Actress: Kajol (Fanaa)
- Most awards: Rang De Basanti (7)
- Most nominations: Kabhi Alvida Naa Kehna (25)

The 10th Zee Cine Awards ceremony honoring the winners and nominees of the best of Bollywood cinema films released in 2006. The ceremony was held on 1 April 2007 at Genting Highlands in Malaysia.

Kabhi Alvida Naa Kehna led the ceremony with 25 nominations, followed by Rang De Basanti with 22 nominations, Omkara with 16 nominations and Krrish with 14 nominations.

Rang De Basanti won 7 awards, including Best Film and Best Director (for Rakeysh Omprakash Mehra), thus becoming the most-awarded film at the ceremony.

== Awards ==
The winners and nominees have been listed below. Winners are listed first, highlighted in boldface, and indicated with a double dagger (‡).

=== Popular Awards ===
Best Film	Best Director
**Rang De Basanti**‡; Kabhi Alvida Naa Kehna; Krrish; Lage Raho Munna Bhai; Omkara; Vivah	**Rakeysh Omprakash Mehra – Rang De Basanti**‡; Karan Johar – Kabhi Alvida Naa Kehna; Rajkumar Hirani – Lage Raho Munna Bhai; Rakesh Roshan – Krrish; Sooraj Barjatya – Vivah; Vishal Bhardwaj – Omkara
Best Actor	Best Actress
**Hrithik Roshan – Krrish**‡; Aamir Khan – Rang De Basanti; Hrithik Roshan – Dhoom 2; Sanjay Dutt – Lage Raho Munna Bhai; Shahrukh Khan – Don; Shahrukh Khan – Kabhi Alvida Naa Kehna	**Kajol – Fanaa**‡; Aishwarya Rai Bachchan – Umrao Jaan; Ayesha Takia – Dor; Bipasha Basu – Corporate; Kareena Kapoor – Omkara; Rani Mukerji – Kabhi Alvida Naa Kehna
Best Supporting Actor	Best Supporting Actress
**Abhishek Bachchan – Kabhi Alvida Naa Kehna**‡; Amitabh Bachchan – Kabhi Alvida Naa Kehna; Kunal Kapoor – Rang De Basanti; Shreyas Talpade – Dor; Siddharth – Rang De Basanti	**Konkona Sen Sharma – Omkara**‡; Kirron Kher – Rang De Basanti; Preity Zinta – Kabhi Alvida Naa Kehna; Rekha – Krrish; Soha Ali Khan – Rang De Basanti
Best Performance in a Negative Role	Best Performance in a Comic Role
**Saif Ali Khan – Omkara**‡; Boman Irani – Khosla Ka Ghosla; John Abraham – Zinda; Naseeruddin Shah – Krrish; Shiney Ahuja – Gangster	**Arshad Warsi – Lage Raho Munna Bhai**‡; Chunky Pandey – Apna Sapna Money Money; Paresh Rawal – Malamaal Weekly; Riteish Deshmukh – Apna Sapna Money Money; Tusshar Kapoor – Golmaal: Fun Unlimited
Best Debut – Male	Best Debut – Female
**Upen Patel – 36 China Town**‡; Siddharth – Rang De Basanti	**Kangana Ranaut – Gangster & Woh Lamhe...**‡; Vipasha Agarwal – I See You
Best Music Director	Best Lyrics
**A. R. Rahman – Rang De Basanti**‡	**Prasoon Joshi – "Masti Ki Paathshaala" – Rang De Basanti**‡; Gulzar – "Beedi Jalaile" – Omkara; Javed Akhtar – "Mitwa" – Kabhi Alvida Naa Kehna; Mir Ali Hussain – "Yeh Honsla" – Dor; Swanand Kirkire – "Bande Mein Tha Dum" – Lage Raho Munna Bhai
Best Male Playback Singer	Best Female Playback Singer
**Shaan – "Chand Sifarish" – Fanaa**‡; KK – "Tu Hi Meri Shab Hai" – Gangster; Shafqat Amanat Ali – "Mitwa" – Kabhi Alvida Naa Kehna; Sonu Nigam – "Kabhi Alvida Naa Kehna" – Kabhi Alvida Naa Kehna; Zubeen Garg – "Ya Ali" – Gangster	**Alka Yagnik – "Tumhi Dekho Naa" – Kabhi Alvida Naa Kehna**‡; Anushka Manchanda – "Golmaal" – Golmaal: Fun Unlimited; Shreya Ghoshal – "So Jaoon Main" – Woh Lamhe...; Sunidhi Chauhan – "Beedi Jalaile" – Omkara; Vasundhara Das – "Where's The Party Tonight?" – Kabhi Alvida Naa Kehna

=== Technical Awards ===
Best Story	Best Screenplay
**Rajkumar Hirani, Abhijat Joshi – Lage Raho Munna Bhai**‡; Jaideep Sahni – Khosla Ka Ghosla; Kamlesh Pandey – Rang De Basanti; Mahesh Bhatt – Gangster; Sooraj Barjatya – Vivah	**Rajkumar Hirani, Abhijat Joshi – Lage Raho Munna Bhai**‡; Anurag Basu – Gangster; Jaideep Sahni – Khosla Ka Ghosla; Karan Johar, Shibani Bathija – Kabhi Alvida Naa Kehna; Rakeysh Omprakash Mehra, Rensil D'Silva – Rang De Basanti
Best Dialogue	Best Editing
**Rajkumar Hirani – Lage Raho Munna Bhai**‡; Jaideep Sahni – Khosla Ka Ghosla; Mir Ali Hussain – Dor; Niranjan Iyengar – Kabhi Alvida Naa Kehna; Prasoon Joshi, Rensil D'Silva – Rang De Basanti	**P. S. Bharathi – Rang De Basanti**‡; Aarif Sheikh – Taxi No. 9211; Akiv Ali – Gangster; Rajkumar Hirani – Lage Raho Munna Bhai; V. N. Mayekar – Vivah
Best Cinematography	Best Art Direction
**Binod Pradhan – Rang De Basanti**‡; Anil Mehta – Kabhi Alvida Naa Kehna; K. U. Mohanan – Don; Sudeep Chatterjee – Dor; Tassaduq Hussain – Omkara	**Sharmishta Roy – Kabhi Alvida Naa Kehna**‡; Aradhana Seth – Don; Sabu Cyril – Jaan-E-Mann; Samir Chanda – Rang De Basanti; Sanjay Dhabade – Vivah
Best Choreography	Best Background Score
**Ganesh Acharya – "Beedi Jalaile" – Omkara**‡; Ganesh Acharya – "Masti Ki Paathshaala" – Rang De Basanti; Ganesh Hegde – "Main Hoon Don" – Don; Farah Khan – "Rock 'N' Roll Soniye" – Kabhi Alvida Naa Kehna; Shiamak Davar – "Dhoom Again" – Dhoom 2	**Salim–Sulaiman – Krrish**‡; A. R. Rahman – Rang De Basanti; Raju Singh – Gangster; Shankar–Ehsaan–Loy – Kabhi Alvida Naa Kehna; Vishal Bhardwaj – Omkara
Best Action	Best Costume Design
**Tony Ching Siu-Tung – Krrish**‡; Allan Amin – Dhoom 2; Jai Singh – Omkara; Sham Kaushal – Don, Krrish; Vikram Dharma– Fight Club – Members Only	**Anna Singh, Bindiya Goswami – Umrao Jaan**‡; Akbar Shahpurwala, Ahmed, Alvira Khan Agnihotri, Neeta Lulla, Narendra Kumar, Sabyasachi Mukherjee – Baabul; Aki Narula – Don; Manish Malhotra – Kabhi Alvida Naa Kehna; Manish Malhotra, Navin Shetty, Rocky Star, Vikram Phadnis, Jaswinder Garder – Krrish
Best Publicity Design	Best Film Processing
**H. R. Enterprises – Kabhi Alvida Naa Kehna**‡; Epigram – Zinda; H. R. Enterprises – Don; H. R. Enterprises – Krrish; H. R. Enterprises – Omkara	**Adlabs Films – Kabhi Alvida Naa Kehna**‡; Adlabs Films – Lage Raho Munna Bhai; Adlabs Films – Omkara; Prasad Labs – Don; Prasad Labs – Krrish
Best Audiography	Best Song Recording
**Jitendra Chaudhary – Krrish**‡; Andrew Belletty – Don; K. J. Singh – Omkara; Nakul Kamte – Rang De Basanti; Stephen Gomes – Kabhi Alvida Naa Kehna	**Salman Afridi – Omkara**‡; Abhay Rumde, Shantanu Mukherjee – Kabhi Alvida Naa Kehna; Andrew Belletty – Don; Bishwadeep Chatterjee, Sachin Sanghvi – Lage Raho Munna Bhai; Jitendra Chaudhary – Krrish
Best Special Effects (Visual)	Best Track of the Year
**Craig Mumma, Marc Kolbe – Krrish**‡; Brynley Cadman – Rang De Basanti; EFX – Prasad – Alag; Red Chillies VFX – Don; Shaikh Rizwan – Kabhi Alvida Naa Kehna	**"Beedi Jalaile" – Omkara**‡; "Jhalak Dikhlaja" – Aksar; "Kabhi Alvida Naa Kehna" – Kabhi Alvida Naa Kehna; "Kya Mujhe Pyar Hai" – Woh Lamhe...; "Rang De Basanti" – Rang De Basanti; "Ya Ali" – Gangster

=== Critics' awards ===
Critics Award for Best Actor	Critics Award for Best Actress
**Sanjay Dutt – Lage Raho Munna Bhai**‡	**Ayesha Takia & Gul Panag – Dor**‡

== Special awards ==
Lifetime Achievement Award: Vinod Khanna	Forever Diva Award: Rekha	Special Recognition: Subhash Ghai
Fun Cinema Entertainer of the year: Shahrukh Khan – Don	Zenith Power Team Award: Lage Raho Munna Bhai & Rang De Basanti	

== Superlatives ==
Multiple nominations
Nominations	Film
25	Kabhi Alvida Naa Kehna
22	Rang De Basanti
16	Omkara
14	Krrish
13	Lage Raho Munna Bhai
11	Don
8	Gangster
5	Dor
5	Vivah
4	Khosla Ka Ghosla
3	Dhoom 2
2	Apna Sapna Money Money
2	Fanaa
2	Golmaal: Fun Unlimited
2	Umrao Jaan
2	Zinda

Multiple wins
Awards	Film
7	Rang De Basanti
6	Lage Raho Munna Bhai
5	Kabhi Alvida Naa Kehna
5	Krrish
5	Omkara
