= 13th Screen Awards =

Awards for Hindi-language films of 2006

- Date: 6 January 2007
- Site: Bandra Kurla Complex Ground, Mumbai
- Hosted by: Raju Srivastav; Navin Prabhakar

Highlights
- Best Picture: Lage Raho Munna Bhai
- Best Direction: Rakeysh Omprakash Mehra (Rang De Basanti)
- Best Actor: Hrithik Roshan (Krrish)
- Best Actress: Kareena Kapoor (Omkara)
- Most awards: Rang De Basanti (8)
- Most nominations: Omkara and Rang De Basanti (18)

Television coverage
- Channel: StarPlus
- Network: Disney Star

The 13th Screen Awards also The Hero Honda 13th Annual Star Screen Awards ceremony, presented by Indian Express Group, honored the best Indian Hindi-language films of 2006. The ceremony was held on 6 January 2007 at Bandra Kurla Complex Ground, Mumbai, hosted by Raju Srivastav and Navin Prabhakar. And it was telecasted on 14 January 2007, StarPlus.

Omkara and Rang De Basanti led the ceremony with 18 nominations each, followed by Gangster and Lage Raho Munnabhai with 10 nominations each and Kabhi Alvida Naa Kehna with 8 nominations.

Rang De Basanti won 8 awards, including Best Director (for Rakeysh Omprakash Mehra) and Best Supporting Actress (for Kirron Kher), thus becoming the most-awarded film at the ceremony.

== Awards ==
The winners and nominees have been listed below. Winners are listed first, highlighted in boldface, and indicated with a double dagger (‡).

=== Main awards ===
Best Film	Best Director
**Lage Raho Munna Bhai** – **Vidhu Vinod Chopra**‡; Krrish – Rakesh Roshan; Omkara – Kumar Mangat Pathak; Rang De Basanti – Ronnie Screwvala, Rakeysh Omprakash Mehra; Vivah – Ajit Kumar Barjatya, Kamal Kumar Barjatya, Rajkumar Barjatya	**Rakeysh Omprakash Mehra – Rang De Basanti**‡; Anurag Basu – Gangster: A Love Story; Nagesh Kukunoor – Dor; Rajkumar Hirani – Lage Raho Munna Bhai; Sooraj Barjatya – Vivah; Vishal Bhardwaj – Omkara
Best Actor	Best Actress
**Hrithik Roshan – Krrish**‡; Aamir Khan – Rang De Basanti; Ajay Devgn – Omkara; Hrithik Roshan – Dhoom 2; Sanjay Dutt – Lage Raho Munna Bhai; Shahid Kapoor – Vivah	**Kareena Kapoor – Omkara**‡; Aishwarya Rai Bachchan – Dhoom 2; Amrita Rao – Vivah; Ayesha Takia – Dor; Bipasha Basu – Corporate; Kajol – Fanaa
Best Supporting Actor	Best Supporting Actress
**Arshad Warsi – Lage Raho Munna Bhai**‡; Amitabh Bachchan – Kabhi Alvida Naa Kehna; Atul Kulkarni – Rang De Basanti; Kunal Kapoor – Rang De Basanti; Nana Patekar – Taxi No. 9211; Sharman Joshi – Rang De Basanti	**Kirron Kher – Rang De Basanti**‡; Gul Panag – Dor; Konkona Sen Sharma – Omkara; Ratna Pathak Shah – Yun Hota Toh Kya Hota; Seema Biswas – Vivah
Best Actor in a Negative Role – Male / Female	Best Actor in a Comic Role – Male / Female
**Saif Ali Khan** – **Omkara**‡; Aamir Khan – Fanaa; Esha Deol – Ankahee; Shah Rukh Khan – Don; Shiney Ahuja – Gangster: A Love Story	**Shreyas Talpade** – **Dor**‡; Om Puri – Malamaal Weekly; Ranvir Shorey – Khosla Ka Ghosla; Tusshar Kapoor – Golmaal: Fun Unlimited; Uday Chopra – Dhoom 2
Best Music Director	Best Lyricist
**Vishal Bhardwaj – Omkara**‡; A. R. Rahman – Rang De Basanti; Anu Malik – Jaan-E-Mann; Himesh Reshammiya – Aksar; Shankar–Ehsaan–Loy – Kabhi Alvida Naa Kehna	**Gulzar – "Beedi Jalaile" – Omkara**‡; Javed Akhtar – "Mitwa" – Kabhi Alvida Naa Kehna; Mir Ali Husain – "Yeh Honsla" – Dor; Prasoon Joshi – "Chand Sifarish" – Fanaa; Swanand Kirkire – "Bande Mein Tha Dum... Vande Mataram" – Lage Raho Munna Bhai
Best Male Playback Singer	Best Female Playback Singer
**Shaan – "Chand Sifarish" – Fanaa**‡; KK – "Tu Hi Meri Shab Hai" – Gangster: A Love Story; Shafqat Amanat Ali – "Mitwa" – Kabhi Alvida Naa Kehna; Sonu Nigam – "Baawri Piya Ki" – Baabul; Sukhwinder Singh – "Omkara" – Omkara; Zubeen Garg – "Ya Ali" – Gangster: A Love Story	**Sunidhi Chauhan – "Beedi" – Omkara**‡; Alka Yagnik – "Tumhi Dekho Naa" – Kabhi Alvida Naa Kehna; Anushka Manchanda – "Golmaal" (Title Track) – Golmaal: Fun Unlimited; Rekha Bhardwaj – "Namak" – Omkara; Shreya Ghoshal – "O Saathi Re" – Omkara
Most Promising Newcomer – Male	Most Promising Newcomer – Female
**Siddharth – Rang De Basanti**‡; Upen Patel – 36 China Town; Vinod Sharawat – Gafla	**Kangana Ranaut – Gangster: A Love Story**‡; Kangana Ranaut – Woh Lamhe...; Onjolee Nair – Holiday
Most Promising Debut Director
**Saket Chaudhary – Pyaar Ke Side Effects**‡; Dibakar Banerjee – Khosla Ka Ghosla; Kabir Khan – Kabul Express; Naseeruddin Shah – Yun Hota Toh Kya Hota

=== Technical Awards ===
Best Story	Best Screenplay
**Rajkumar Hirani**, **Abhijat Joshi** – **Lage Raho Munna Bhai**‡; Jaideep Sahni – Khosla Ka Ghosla; Kamlesh Pandey – Rang De Basanti; Mahesh Bhatt – Gangster: A Love Story; Sameer Hanchate – Gafla	**Rakeysh Omprakash Mehra**, **Rensil D'Silva** – **Rang De Basanti**‡; Anurag Basu – Gangster: A Love Story; Priyadarshan – Malamaal Weekly; Rajkumar Hirani, Abhijat Joshi – Lage Raho Munna Bhai; Saket Chaudhary – Pyaar Ke Side Effects
Best Dialogue	Best Editing
**Rajkumar Hirani**, **Abhijat Joshi** – **Lage Raho Munna Bhai**‡; Kunal Kohli – Fanaa; Manisha Korde – Malamaal Weekly; Prasoon Joshi, Rensil D'Silva – Rang De Basanti; Vishal Bhardwaj – Omkara	**Rajkumar Hirani** – **Lage Raho Munna Bhai**‡; Aarif Shaikh – Taxi No. 9211; Akiv Ali – Gangster: A Love Story; P. S. Bharathi – Rang De Basanti
Best Cinematography	Best Background Music
**Binod Pradhan** – **Rang De Basanti**‡; Anil Mehta – Kabhi Alvida Naa Kehna; Hemant Chaturvedi – Anthony Kaun Hai?; K. U. Mohanan – Don; Tassaduq Hussain Mufti – Omkara	**A. R. Rahman** – **Rang De Basanti**‡; Raju Singh – Gangster: A Love Story; Salim–Sulaiman – Dor; Salim–Sulaiman – Fanaa; Vishal Bhardwaj – Omkara
Best Art Direction	Best Sound Design
**Samir Chanda** – **Rang De Basanti**‡; Aradhana Seth – Don; Sabu Cyril – Jaan-E-Mann; Samir Chanda – Omkara; Sharmishta Roy – Kabhi Alvida Naa Kehna	**Nakul Kamte** – **Rang De Basanti**‡; Aadil Ali – Gangster: A Love Story; Andrew Belletty – Don; Jitendra Choudhary – Krrish; K. J. Singh – Omkara
Best Choreography	Best Action
**Shiamak Davar** – **"Dhoom Again"** – **Dhoom 2**‡; Farah Khan – "Humko Maloom Hai" – Jaan-E-Mann; Ganesh Acharya – "Beedi" – Omkara; Ganesh Acharya – "Masti Ki Paathshaala" – Rang De Basanti; Ganesh Hegde – "Main Hoon Don" – Don	**Tony Ching**, **Siu-Tung** & **Sham Kaushal** – **Krrish**‡; Allan Amin – Dhoom 2; Sham Kaushal – Don
Best Special Effects (Visual)	Best Exhibitor
**Prasad EFX** – **Krrish**‡; Prasad EFX – Alag; Prime Focus Ltd – Jaan-E-Mann; Red Chillies VFX – Don; Tata Elexi – Dhoom 2	**Cinemax**‡

=== Critics' awards ===
Critics Best Actor – Male	Critics Best Actor – Female
**Sanjay Dutt – Lage Raho Munna Bhai as Professor Murliprasad "Munna Bhai" Sharma**‡	**Ayesha Takia – Dor as Meera**‡

=== Special awards ===
Lifetime Achievement Award
**Biswajit Chatterjee**	**Mala Sinha**
Ramnath Goenka Award
**Dibakar Banerjee** – **Khosla Ka Ghosla**
Jodi No. 1
**Shah Rukh Khan &** **Rani Mukerji (Kabhi Alvida Naa Kehna)**
Best Indian Film in English
**Being Cyrus**

== Superlatives ==
Multiple nominations
Nominations	Film
18	Omkara
18	Rang De Basanti
10	Gangster
10	Lage Raho Munna Bhai
8	Kabhi Alvida Naa Kehna
7	Don
7	Dor
6	Dhoom 2
6	Fanaa
5	Krrish
5	Vivah
4	Jaan-E-Mann
4	Khosla Ka Ghosla
3	Malamaal Weekly
2	Gafla
2	Golmaal: Fun Unlimited
2	Pyaar Ke Side Effects
2	Taxi No. 9211
2	Yun Hota Toh Kya Hota

Multiple wins
Awards	Film
8	Rang De Basanti
6	Lage Raho Munna Bhai
5	Omkara
3	Krrish
2	Dor
