= Chand Sifarish =

Song performed by Shaan and Kailash Kher

- Chand Sifarish song cover featuring actors Aamir Khan and Kajol

Song by Shaan and Kailash Kher

from the album Fanaa
- Language: Hindi
- Released: 12 April 2006
- Length: 4:37
- Label: YRF Music
- Composer: Jatin–Lalit
- Lyricist: Prasoon Joshi

Music video
- "Chand Sifarish" on YouTube

"Chand Sifarish" (transl. The moon recommends) is a song from the 2006 Hindi film Fanaa, sung by Shaan and Kailash Kher. The song received positive reception from critics and won two awards at both the International Indian Film Academy Awards and that country's Filmfare Awards.

== Composition and music video ==
The lyrics for the song were written by Prasoon Joshi and the music was composed by the duo Jatin–Lalit. Instruments used to compose the music include the oud, the sitar, the sarod and the tabla.

The song is picturized upon Aamir Khan and Kajol, lead cast of the film. The music video was shot at the National Rail Museum, New Delhi.

== Reception ==
The song was lauded by critics. One rediff.com music review noted, "Well versed and rhythmic in melody, the vibrant number is an instant hit on the senses." A reviewer of Planet Bollywood wrote, "Shaan sounds as if he will run away with the best singer award".

"Chand Sifarish" won two awards at the 52nd ceremony of India's Filmfare Awards—Best Lyricist for Joshi and Best Male Playback Singer for Shaan and Kher. The song won two awards at the 8th ceremony of India's IIFA Awards—Best Lyricist for Joshi and Best Male Playback Singer for Shaan. At the 10th ceremony of India's Zee Cine Awards, Shaan won the Best Playback Singer – Male award.

== In popular culture ==
In January 2024, Anshuman Sharma uploaded an Instagram post containing a version of the song he had produced with Aditya Kalway. Their version used AI-generated vocals of Kishore Kumar and Mohammed Rafi, and scored five million views within two days.
