= Mitwa =

2006 Hindi song

Song by Shafqat Amanat Ali and Caralisa Monteiro

from the album Kabhi Alvida Naa Kehna
- Released: 16 June 2006 (India)
- Recorded: 2005
- Genre: Feature film soundtrack Sufi rock
- Length: 6:23
- Label: Sony BMG
- Composer: Shankar–Ehsaan–Loy
- Lyricist: Javed Akhtar
- Producer: Karan Johar

Music video
- Mitwa on YouTube

"Mitwa" (transl. Friend) is a romantic Hindi-language song from the 2006 Bollywood musical romantic drama Kabhi Alvida Naa Kehna, directed by Karan Johar. The track is composed by Shankar–Ehsaan–Loy, while the lyrics are penned by Javed Akhtar. The song was sung by Pakistani singer Shafqat Amanat Ali and Caralisa Monteiro, who also penned the phrase "love will find a way..." in the song. The music video of the song featured the film's lead actors Shah Rukh Khan and Rani Mukherji.

== Development ==
Shankar Mahadevan had previously heard the song "Aankhon Ke Saagar" by Pakistani vocalist Shafqat Amanat Ali on the radio, and impressed by his vocals, gathered details about him from a friend at the radio station. When Shankar–Ehsaan–Loy composed Mitwa, they decided to opt for Ali instead of Mahadevan himself, since they wanted the song to sound different. The song is a Sufi rock ballad, which is the first of its kind in a Karan Johar film. It depicts the growing feelings of love between Dev (Khan) and Maya (Mukerji), despite being married to different people. The trio used the traditional Indian instruments Santoor and Sarod which was played by Mahadevan. The song also has a remix version called "Mitwa – Revisited".

The song is set in raga Khamaj.

== Critical reception ==
"Mitwa" received widespread critical and popular acclaim. Joginder Tuteja of Bollywood Hungama noted, "Mitwa is a sure shot chartbuster number. The song has a good rhythm to it and though it starts off with distinct Pakistani shade, it takes a lot from Indian classical music as it progresses further. It is a number that could easily belong to Indi/Paki pop genre. 'Mitwa Revisited' follows a little later and the remix version turns out to be highly trendy." Sukanya Verma of Rediff stated, "Mitwa is uplifting and lively. The synthesis of Fuzon vocalist Shafqat Amanat Ali, Shankar Mahadevan and Caralisa's voices with Javed Akhtar's compelling lyrics results in wonderful, rousing music."

== Chart performance ==
According to the figures from Box Office India, the album of the film sold over 1,900,000 copies in India making it the second best-selling album of the year, marginally behind Dhoom 2. The song "Mitwa", received excellent feedback from critics and audience alike. The song ruled the charts in coming days. It was placed in PlanetBollywood.com's Top 10 songs list. Bollywood Hungama, in its half-yearly music roundup, remarked, "The song that rocks most is 'Mitwa', that has so far been responsible for the good opening of KANK."

== Trivia ==
Actress Vidya Balan is admittedly a fan of the song, stating "When Mitwa plays, my hands go out like Shah Rukh Khan's". She insisted that the song be played prior to shooting the romantic sequences of the song "Bakhuda Tumhi Ho" between Vidya Balan and Shahid Kapoor for the romantic comedy Kismat Konnection (2008).

== Accolades ==
Award	Date of ceremony	Category	Recipient(s)	Result	Ref.
Bollywood Movie Awards	26 May 2007	Best Music Director	Shankar–Ehsaan–Loy	Won	
Filmfare Awards	17 February 2007	Best Music Director	Shankar–Ehsaan–Loy	Nominated	
Filmfare Awards	17 February 2007	Best Background Score	Shankar–Ehsaan–Loy	Nominated	
Filmfare Awards	17 February 2007	Best Lyricist	Javed Akhtar	Nominated	
Global Indian Film Awards	7–9 December 2006	Best Music Director	Shankar–Ehsaan–Loy	Nominated	
Global Indian Film Awards	7–9 December 2006	Best Male Playback Singer	Shafqat Amanat Ali	Nominated	
International Indian Film Academy Awards	7–9 June 2007	Best Music Director	Shankar–Ehsaan–Loy	Nominated	
Screen Awards	6 January 2007	Best Music Director	Shankar–Ehsaan–Loy	Nominated	
Screen Awards	6 January 2007	Best Lyricist	Javed Akhtar	Nominated	
Screen Awards	6 January 2007	Best Male Playback Singer	Shafqat Amanat Ali	Nominated	
Zee Cine Awards	1 April 2007	Best Music Director	Shankar–Ehsaan–Loy	Nominated	
Zee Cine Awards	1 April 2007	Best Background Score	Shankar–Ehsaan–Loy	Nominated	
Zee Cine Awards	1 April 2007	Best Lyricist	Javed Akhtar	Nominated	
Zee Cine Awards	1 April 2007	Best Male Playback Singer	Shafqat Amanat Ali	Nominated	
Zee Cine Awards	1 April 2007	Best Audiography	Stephen Gomes	Nominated	
Zee Cine Awards	1 April 2007	Best Song Recording	Abhay Rumde, Shantanu Mukherjee	Nominated	
