= 2nd Global Indian Film Awards =

The 2nd Global Indian Film Awards (2006) were presented in Kuala Lumpur, Malaysia.

== Background ==
The entire event was organised by Suniel Shetty's Popcorn Entertainment and One Big Option between 7 and 9 December 2006. The previous awards ceremony was held in Dubai, United Arab Emirates. The members of jury were Jackie Shroff, Rati Agnihotri, Sajid Nadiadwala, Sandeep Chowta, Shyam Benegal, and Smita Thackeray. Batuk Seri Tengku Adnan Tengku Mansor, the tourism minister of Malaysia, launched the awards on 9 May 2006. Initially, the function was scheduled to run from 30 August to 2 September 2006.

== Events ==
Baabul was screened at a cinema hall in Kuala Lumpur City Centre. The promo of Shootout at Lokhandwala, directed by Apoorva Lakhia, screened to positive responses, especially from Shah Rukh Khan and Jeetendra. Showreels of Dus Kahaniyaan and Woodstock Villa were also shown. Music launch for the film I See You was held at a Provogue-sponsored fashion show. A football match between Bollywood actors and Malaysian ministers was also conducted. The charity fashion show raised around ₹2.2 million (US$23,000) for the Cine Artiste Association. Costumes auctioned included Salman Khan's jacket, Hema Malini's sari, Amitabh Bachchan's coat, Rani Mukherjee's sari and John Abraham's costumes worn for Baabul.

== Award ceremony and reception ==
Shah Rukh Khan, Salman Khan, Abhishek Bachchan, Priyanka Chopra, Katrina Kaif and Ameesha Patel performed at the awards ceremony hosted by Arshad Warsi, Amrita Arora, Minissha Lamba, Arbaaz Khan and Arjun Rampal. An estimated audience of 4,000 was present at the awards ceremony, including Malaysian prime minister Abdullah Badawi, Malaysian queen and deputy premier Najib Tun Razak. Kaif was awarded the title of Most Beautiful Lips.

A commentator writing for the Mumbai Mirror accused the organisers for giving "preferential treatment" and mismanagement. One of the jury members Jackie Shroff, was reportedly on a vacation in the Indian state of Goa and was unaware of the event while it was being conducted. Filmmaker Sanjay Gupta, however, defended the organisers, saying "Those who drive Fiats were given Mercs. And still they're grumbling!". Film journalist Bharati S. Pradhan wrote in The Telegraph that the awards ceremony was a "baggy, poorly-arranged show by all accounts" and the reason Gupta was defending the organisers was that he had close relations with them.

== Nominees and winners ==
Key
†	Denotes winner of the awards category

Category	Nominees	For
Best Film	Karan Johar	Kabhi Alvida Naa Kehna
Best Film	Rakesh Roshan	Krrish
Best Film	Vidhu Vinod Chopra	Lage Raho Munnabhai
Best Film	Shemaroo; Kumar Mangat	Omkara
Best Film	UTV Motion Pictures; Rakeysh Omprakash Mehra	Rang De Basanti
Best Director	Kunal Kohli	Fanaa
Best Director	Rajkumar Hirani	Lage Raho Munnabhai
Best Director	Rakesh Roshan	Krrish
Best Director	Rakeysh Omprakash Mehra	Rang De Basanti
Best Director	Vishal Bharadwaj	Omkara
Best Actor	Aamir Khan	Rang De Basanti
Best Actor	Ajay Devgan	Omkara
Best Actor	Hrithik Roshan	Krrish
Best Actor	Sanjay Dutt	Lage Raho Munnabhai
Best Actor	Shahrukh Khan	Kabhi Alvida Naa Kehna
Best Actress	Bipasha Basu	Corporate
Best Actress	Kajol	Fanaa
Best Actress	Kangana Ranaut	Gangster
Best Actress	Kareena Kapoor	Omkara
Best Actress	Rani Mukherjee	Kabhi Alvida Naa Kehna
Best Actress	Alice Patten	Rang De Basanti
Best Actor in A Supporting Role	Abhishek Bachchan	Kabhi Alvida Naa Kehna
Best Actor in A Supporting Role	Amitabh Bachchan	Kabhi Alvida Naa Kehna
Best Actor in A Supporting Role	Arshad Warsi	Lage Raho Munnabhai
Best Actor in A Supporting Role	Atul Kulkarni	Rang De Basanti
Best Actor in A Supporting Role	Kay Kay Menon	Corporate
Best Actress in A Supporting Role	Bipasha Basu	Omkara
Best Actress in A Supporting Role	Dimple Kapadia	Being Cyrus
Best Actress in A Supporting Role	Preity Zinta	Kabhi Alvida Naa Kehna
Best Actress in A Supporting Role	Soha Ali Khan	Rang De Basanti
Best Actress in A Supporting Role	Shabana Azmi	15 Park Avenue
Best Actor in A Comic Role	Anupam Kher	Khosla Ka Ghosla
Best Actor in A Comic Role	Boman Irani	Lage Raho Munnabhai
Best Actor in A Comic Role	Paresh Rawal	Malamaal Weekly
Best Actor in A Comic Role	Sharman Joshi	Golmaal
Best Actor in A Comic Role	Tusshar Kapoor	Golmaal
Best Actor in A Villainous Role	Dilip Prabhawalkar	Shiva
Best Actor in A Villainous Role	Irrfan Khan	The Killer
Best Actor in A Villainous Role	John Abraham	Zinda
Best Actor in A Villainous Role	Naseeruddin Shah	Krrish
Best Actor in A Villainous Role	Saif Ali Khan	Omkara
Best Music	A. R. Rahman	Rang De Basanti
Best Music	Jatin–Lalit	Fanaa
Best Music	Pritam Chakravarthy	Gangster
Best Music	Shankar–Ehsaan–Loy	Kabhi Alvida Naa Kehna
Best Music	Vishal Bharadwaj	Omkara
Best Lyrics	Gulzar	"Omkara"—Omkara
Best Lyrics	Gulzar	"O Saathi Re"—Omkara
Best Lyrics	Javed Akhtar	"Kabhi Alvida Naa Kehna"—Kabhi Alvida Naa Kehna
Best Lyrics	Prasoon Joshi	"Roobaroo"—Rang De Basanti
Best Lyrics	Prasoon Joshi	"Chand Sifarish"—Fanaa
Best Playback Singer (Male)	Shaan, Kailash Kher	"Chand Sifarish"—Fanaa
Best Playback Singer (Male)	Shafqat Amanat Ali	"Mitwa"—Kabhi Alvida Naa Kehna
Best Playback Singer (Male)	Sonu Nigam	"Kabhi Alvida Naa Kehna"—Kabhi Alvida Naa Kehna
Best Playback Singer (Male)	Sukhwinder Singh	"Omkara"—Omkara
Best Playback Singer (Male)	Zubeen Garg	"Ya Ali"—Gangster
Best Playback Singer (Female)	Alka Yagnik	"Kabhi Alvida Naa Kehna"—Kabhi Alvida Naa Kehna
Best Playback Singer (Female)	Madhushree	"Tu Bin Bataye"—Rang De Basanti
Best Playback Singer (Female)	Shreya Ghoshal	"O Saathi Re"—Omkara
Best Playback Singer (Female)	Shreya Ghoshal	"Pal Pal Har Pal"—Lage Raho Munnabhai
Best Playback Singer (Female)	Sunidhi Chauhan	"Beedi Jalai Le"—Omkara
Best Choreographer	Ahmed Khan	"Ashiqui Mein Teri"—36 China Town
Best Choreographer	Ganesh Acharya	"Beedi Jalai Le"—Omkara
Best Choreographer	Farah Khan	"Where's The Party Tonight"—Kabhi Alvida Naa Kehna
Best Choreographer	Farah Khan	"Dil Na Diya"—Krrish
Best Choreographer	Saroj Khan	"Desh Rangila"—Fanaa
Critics Choice Awards —Director	Aparna Sen	15 Park Avenue
Critics Choice Awards —Director	Onir	Bas Ek Pal
Critics Choice Awards —Director	Homi Adajania	Being Cyrus
Critics Choice Awards —Director	Nagesh Kukunoor	Dor
Critics Choice Awards —Director	Mohit Suri	Woh Lamhe
Critics Choice Awards —Best Actor (Male)	Sanjay Dutt	Lage Raho Munnabhai
Critics Choice Awards —Best Actor (Female)	Bipasha Basu	Corporate
Critics Choice Awards —Best Actor in a Comic Role	Anupam Kher	Khosla Ka Ghosla
Best Debut Director	Homi Adajania	Being Cyrus
Best Debut Director	Naseeruddin Shah	Yun Hota Toh Kya Hota
Best Debut Director	Dibakar Banerjee	Khosla Ka Ghosla
Best Debut Director	Vikram Chopra	Fight Club - Members Only
Best Debut Director	Abhigyan Jha; Abhiman Rajhans	Sacred Evil – A True Story
Best Debut Actor	Upen Patel	36 China Town
Best Debut Actress	Kangana Ranaut	Gangster
Outstanding contribution to Indian Cinema	Rakesh Roshan	—
Most Searched Actor	Shahrukh Khan	—
Most Searched Actress	Priyanka Chopra	—
Best Story	Rajkumar Hirani; Vidhu Vinod Chopra	Lage Raho Munnabhai
Best Screenplay	Rensil D'Silva; Rakeysh Omprakash Mehra	Rang De Basanti
Best Dialogues	Abhijat Joshi; Rajkumar Hirani	Lage Raho Munnabhai
Best Cinematography	Tassaduq Hussain	Omkara
Best Editing	P. S. Bharathi	Rang De Basanti
Best Sound Design	Jitendra Chaudhary; Nakul Kamte	Krrish
Best Background Score	A. R. Rahman	Rang De Basanti
Best Art Direction	Samir Chanda	Rang De Basanti
Best Action	Tony–Sui–Ching; Shyam Kaushal	Krrish
