= Fanaa (2006 film) =

2006 Indian film by Kunal Kohli

- Theatrical release poster
- Directed by: Kunal Kohli
- Written by: Shibani Bathija
- Dialogues by: Kunal Kohli
- Produced by: Aditya Chopra
- Starring: Aamir Khan; Kajol; Rishi Kapoor; Ali Haji; Tabu; Kirron Kher
- Cinematography: Ravi K. Chandran
- Edited by: Ritesh Soni
- Music by: Songs: Jatin–Lalit; Score: Salim–Sulaiman
- Production company: Yash Raj Films
- Distributed by: Yash Raj Films
- Release date: 26 May 2006
- Running time: 169 minutes
- Country: India
- Language: Hindi
- Box office: ₹105.48 crore

Fanaa (transl. Annihilation) is a 2006 Indian Hindi-language romantic action thriller film directed by Kunal Kohli and produced by Aditya Chopra and Yash Chopra under their banner Yash Raj Films. It stars Aamir Khan and Kajol in the lead roles, with Rishi Kapoor, Kirron Kher, Tabu, and Sharat Saxena appearing in supporting roles. In the film, Zooni (Kajol), a blind Kashmiri dancer, falls in love with Rehan (Khan), a Delhi tour guide with a dark secret.

Fanaa was one of the most expensive Bollywood films at its time of release. The film's title is derived from the Islamic Sufi term fanaa, meaning "destroyed". Khan and Kajol were paired romantically opposite each other for the first time, but it marked their second collaboration after Ishq (1997). It also marked the comeback of Kajol, who was last seen in Karan Johar's family drama Kabhi Khushi Kabhie Gham... (2001).

Fanaa was released on 26 May 2006, and grossed over ₹1.05 billion at the box-office against a production and marketing budget of ₹300 million, thus becoming the sixth highest grossing Hindi film of the year. The film emerged a major commercial success, despite having been banned in the state of Gujarat due to protests against Khan for his comments criticizing the Gujarat government. At the 52nd Filmfare Awards, Fanaa won three awards, including Best Actress (Kajol).

== Plot ==
Zooni Ali Beg is a blind Kashmiri woman who travels for the first time to New Delhi, with her friends, Fatima "Fatty" Ali, Mehbooba "Bobo" Siddiqui, Rubina "Ruby" Ansari, and their dance teacher, Helen, to perform in a ceremony for Republic Day. There, she meets their tour guide, Rehan Qadri. Although her friends dislike his flirtatious personality, Zooni falls in love with him. Rehan and Zooni spend their last night in Delhi together before she leaves for Kashmir. Rehan stops Zooni from leaving Delhi and she stays. Her parents soon arrive in Delhi to make arrangements for their wedding. Zooni's eyesight is restored after a surgery, but when she awakes, she finds out Rehan was killed in a bombing in the city.

Malini Tyagi, an anti-terrorism agent, investigates the bombing and the IKF, the group responsible. It is revealed the IKF is fighting for an independent Kashmir and that Rehan is their leader, having faked his death so Zooni wouldn't come looking for him. He admits he loves Zooni, but concedes that she can never see him again because of his dangerous life. Seven years later, it is revealed the IKF have acquired a nuclear weapon after attacking an Indian Army station, but that the IKF still require a trigger. Susheel Rawat, Malini's teammate, orders for all nuclear triggers to be moved. Rehan, operating undercover within the Army, steals a trigger as it is being moved, but Malini figures out he is the IKF leader and sends forces to stop him. In the ensuing shootout, Rehan is badly injured.

He makes his way to a remote house for help, which turns out to be Zooni's. Zooni, now a mother to a son named after his father, and her father Zulfikar nurse Rehan to health, with Zooni's mother Nafisa revealed to have died two years prior. Zooni and Zulfikar do not recognise Rehan. Though initially distant from them, Rehan develops an affection for his son and the family. Rehan eventually reveals his identity to them, but does not mention his terrorism. Initially hurt, Zooni refuses to let Rehan leave her again, and they marry with Zulfikar presiding.

Malini publishes a public report about Rehan, revealing that he is a terrorist. Zulfikar sees this report and confronts Rehan on finding the trigger in his pocket. Rehan accidentally throws him off a ledge, killing him. He radios the IKF from a nearby army officer's house, but kills the officer when he discovers Rehan. Zooni finds her father's body, and realizes Rehan lied about his death. Zooni later sees the report and finds the trigger and flees with her son to the officer's house, and radios for help. Malini responds, and tells her to stop Rehan.

The next day, Rehan returns and takes the trigger from Zooni, saying the IKF will kill her and their son if he does not. Rehan was about to give the trigger to the leader of the IKF, who is Rehan's maternal grandfather. Zooni shoots him in the leg, preventing this from happening. Rehan draws his gun on her, but can't bring himself to shoot. Zooni shoots him again, this time fatally. In the nick of time, Malini arrives and stops the IKF from killing Zooni. Rehan dies in Zooni's arms.

Zooni and her son then visit the graves of her father and Rehan, who are buried next to each other. When her son asks if his father was wrong, Zooni tells him that his father did what he thought was right.

== Cast ==
- Aamir Khan as Rehan Khan / Ranjeev Singh / Rehan Qadri
- Kajol as Zooni Ali Beg
- Rishi Kapoor as Zulfikar Ali Beg: Zooni's father
- Tabu as Malini Tyagi
- Lara Dutta as Zeenat (guest appearance)
- Kirron Kher as Nafisa Ali Beg: Zooni's mother
- Shiney Ahuja as Major Suraj Ahuja
- Satish Shah as Colonel Maan Singh
- Lillete Dubey as Helen: Zooni's instructor
- Sharat Saxena as Susheel Rawat
- Ahmad Khan as Naana: Rehan's grandfather
- Vrajesh Hirjee as Balwant: Rehan's assistant
- Jaspal Bhatti as Inspector Jolly Good Singh
- Gautami Kapoor as Rubina "Ruby" Ansari: Zooni's friend
- Shruti Seth as Fatima "Fatty" Ali: Zooni's friend
- Sanaya Irani as Mehbooba "Bobo" Siddiqui: Zooni's friend
- Ali Haji as Rehan Qadri Jr.: Rehan and Zooni's son
- Suresh Menon as Venkateshwar Atti Cooper Rao
- Shishir Sharma as Indian Defence Minister
- Puneet Vashist as Captain Ijaz Khan

== Production ==
=== Casting ===
Aamir Khan was the first choice for the role of Rehan Qadri. He readily accepted, marking his first collaboration with Yash Raj Films. He had earlier worked with Yash Chopra in Parampara (1993), which was produced outside the Yash Raj Banner. Initially, Aishwarya Rai was wanted as the female lead by Yash Raj Films, but after director Kohli asked Khan on who to recommend, they settled on Kajol to play as Zooni. Kajol had also been offered a role in Kabhi Alvida Naa Kehna but ultimately chose Fanaa instead. Sushmita Sen was also originally cast for the role of Malini before Tabu was named.

=== Filming ===
Principal photography took place in multiple locations across India and Europe. Production was mostly shot at the Tatra Mountains in southern Poland that provided a similar snowy, mountainous landscape substituting the Kashmir Valley.

Additional filming occurred across various landmarks in Delhi, including the Red Fort, Jantar Mantar, Qutb Minar, and Lodi Gardens.

== Reception ==
=== Box office ===
Fanaa was released theatrically on 26 May 2006 and opened to strong box office performance in India and overseas. The film was a commercial success, despite an unofficial ban in the Indian state of Gujarat which was prompted by political protests against Aamir Khan's comments regarding the Narmada Dam project. According to Yash Raj Films, Fanaa grossed ₹47.19 crores in its first week worldwide, including ₹32 crores from India and ₹15.19 crores from overseas markets. The film went on to earn approximately ₹1.05 billion worldwide against a budget of ₹300 million.

In India, the film collected ₹72.04 million gross (₹51.87 million net), while its overseas earnings were reported at ₹30.8 million. Fanaa concluded its theatrical run as the sixth-highest grossing Hindi film of the year.

=== Critical response ===
On the review aggregator website Rotten Tomatoes, 100% of 7 critics' reviews are positive, with an average rating of 6.3/10.

Taran Adarsh of Bollywood Hungama awarded the film 4 out of 5 stars, calling it "a beautifully written, effectively acted, and meticulously crafted effort." He also criticized the pacing, noting that the narrative "tends to get very lengthy" in the second half. Subhash K. Jha of The Times of India praised Khan's performance, stating he "scales the ladder some more and almost creates an actor’s manual for impeccable acting," while calling the film "an emotional experience that showcases Aamir as never before." Sukanya Verma of Rediff.com appreciated the dynamic between the lead actors, writing that they "share a dynamic equation, which makes their inability to let go of each other believable and heartfelt." She concluded that the film was "engaging and entertaining."

Raja Sen, also of Rediff.com, argued that "a mere casting coup does not a good film make," and found the movie "extremely melodramatic series of coincidences". Hindustan Times stated that the film "falters because of its storyline and script," though it praised Kajol's performance for its maturity and nuance, noting she "emotes with more maturity and looks trimmer." Internationally, the film drew mixed reviews. Anupama Chopra, writing for The New York Times, described Fanaa as "a polished, visually stunning production". Poonam Joshi of the BBC called the film "pure Bollywood in its most cliché-ridden form," while prasing the cinematography and sums it up as a movie which "falls into the realm of disposable melodrama, yet is rendered strangely entertaining thanks to Aamir and Kajol.".

== Soundtrack ==
Fanaa

Studio album by Jatin–Lalit
- Released: 12 April 2006
- Genre: Feature film soundtrack
- Label: YRF Music
- Producer: Jatin–Lalit

The music of Fanaa composed by Jatin–Lalit with Salim–Sulaiman providing the background score. The lyrics were penned by Prasoon Joshi. 5 songs are featured in the movie while the soundtrack contains 7 songs. This was the last film for which Jatin–Lalit composed as a duo (they split afterwards).

According to the Indian trade website Box Office India, the album sold 17,00,000 units.

Salim–Sulaiman programmed for the first 5 songs and Dhrubajyoti Phukan programmed the song "Destroyed in Love".

Aamir Khan and Kajol recite lines of poetry in "Mere Haath Mein" and "Chanda Chamke".

All tracks are written by Prasoon Joshi.

| No. | Title | Singer(s) | Length |
|---|---|---|---|
| 1. | "Chand Sifarish" | Shaan, Kailash Kher | 04:37 |
| 2. | "Mere Haath Mein" (poetry by Aamir Khan and Kajol) | Sonu Nigam, Sunidhi Chauhan, William Rousseau, Sulaiman Merchant | 04:48 |
| 3. | "Des Rangila" | Mahalakshmi Iyer, Amanat Ali | 05:18 |
| 4. | "Dekho Na" | Sonu Nigam and Sunidhi Chauhan | 05:24 |
| 5. | "Chanda Chamke" (poetry by Aamir Khan and Kajol) | Mahalakshmi Iyer, Master Akshay Bhagwat, Babul Supriyo | 03:50 |
| 6. | "Destroyed in Love" | Strings | 04:52 |
| 7. | "Fanaa For You" (sampling Chand Sifarish) | Shaan, Kailash Kher (remixed by DJ Aqeel) | 04:26 |

== Accolades ==
| Award | Date of the ceremony | Category | Recipients | Result | Ref. |
|---|---|---|---|---|---|
| Global Indian Film Awards | 7–9 December 2006 | Best Director | Kunal Kohli | Nominated | |
| Global Indian Film Awards | 7–9 December 2006 | Best Actress | Kajol | Nominated | |
| Global Indian Film Awards | 7–9 December 2006 | Best Music Director | Jatin–Lalit | Nominated | |
| Global Indian Film Awards | 7–9 December 2006 | Best Lyricist | Prasoon Joshi for "Chand Sifarish" | Nominated | |
| Global Indian Film Awards | 7–9 December 2006 | Best Male Playback Singer | Shaan & Kailash Kher for "Chand Sifarish" | Nominated | |
| Global Indian Film Awards | 7–9 December 2006 | Best Choreography | Saroj Khan for "Desh Rangila" | Nominated | |
| Pogo Amazing Kids Awards | 10 December 2006 | Most Amazing Actress | Kajol | Nominated | |
| Annual Central European Bollywood Awards | 2007 | Best Director | Kunal Kohli | Nominated | |
| Annual Central European Bollywood Awards | 2007 | Best Actress | Kajol | Nominated | |
| Screen Awards | 6 January 2007 | Best Actress | Kajol | Nominated | |
| Screen Awards | 6 January 2007 | Best Villain | Aamir Khan | Nominated | |
| Screen Awards | 6 January 2007 | Best Music Director | Jatin–Lalit | Nominated | |
| Screen Awards | 6 January 2007 | Best Lyricist | Prasoon Joshi for "Chand Sifarish" | Nominated | |
| Screen Awards | 6 January 2007 | Best Male Playback Singer | Shaan & Kailash Kher for "Chand Sifarish" | Won | |
| Screen Awards | 6 January 2007 | Best Background Music | Salim–Sulaiman | Nominated | |
| Screen Awards | 6 January 2007 | Best Dialogue | Kunal Kohli | Nominated | |
| Filmfare Awards | 17 February 2007 | Best Actress | Kajol | Won | |
| Filmfare Awards | 17 February 2007 | Best Music Director | Jatin–Lalit | Nominated | |
| Filmfare Awards | 17 February 2007 | Best Lyricist | Prasoon Joshi for "Chand Sifarish" | Won | |
| Filmfare Awards | 17 February 2007 | Best Male Playback Singer | Shaan & Kailash Kher for "Chand Sifarish" | Won | |
| Stardust Awards | 18 February 2007 | Star of the Year – Female | Kajol | Nominated | |
| Zee Cine Awards | 1 April 2007 | Best Actress | Kajol | Won | |
| Zee Cine Awards | 1 April 2007 | Best Male Playback Singer | Shaan & Kailash Kher for "Chand Sifarish" | Won | |
| Bollywood Movie Awards | 26 May 2007 | Best Actress | Kajol | Nominated | |
| Bollywood Movie Awards | 26 May 2007 | Best Actor/Actress in a Negative Role | Aamir Khan | Nominated | |
| Bollywood Movie Awards | 26 May 2007 | Best Playback Singer – Male | Shaan & Kailash Kher for "Chand Sifarish" | Won | |
| IIFA Awards | 7–9 June 2007 | Best Actress | Kajol | Nominated | |
| IIFA Awards | 7–9 June 2007 | Best Lyricist | Prasoon Joshi for "Chand Sifarish" | Won | |
| IIFA Awards | 7–9 June 2007 | Best Male Playback Singer | Shaan & Kailash Kher for "Chand Sifarish" | Won | |

== Controversy ==
While promoting the film in Gujarat, Aamir Khan made some comments regarding the Gujarat Chief Minister Narendra Modi's handling of the Narmada Dam and the necessity to rehabilitate the displaced villagers. These comments were met with outrage from the Bharatiya Janata Party. The government of Gujarat demanded an apology from Khan. Khan refused to apologise, saying "I am saying exactly what the Supreme Court has said. I only asked for rehabilitation of poor farmers. I never spoke against the construction of the dam. I will not apologise for my comments on the issue." An unofficial ban of Fanaa was put in place for the entire state of Gujarat. Protests occurred against the film and Khan which included the burning of posters of the star in effigy. As a result, several multiplex owners stated that they could not provide security to customers. Thus, all theatre owners in Gujarat refused to screen the movie.

Producer Aditya Chopra moved a petition to the Supreme Court of India asking them to direct the Gujarat government to provide protection to all cinema halls that wanted to screen the film, but was rejected. Their response was that if a cinema was concerned for their protection they could call on the police. Aditya's father Yash Chopra in the meantime also sought protection from then-Chief Minister Narendra Modi as well as open discussions to release the film in Gujarat without any disruption. Khan also received support from a number of Bollywood stars including Anil Kapoor, Govind Nihalani, Ashutosh Gowariker and Subhash Ghai as well as Anupam Kher and Hrithik Roshan all of whom reiterated that Khan had done no wrong in expressing his views.

Addressing the media, director Kunal Kohli said, "All theatre owners or exhibitors who wish to release this film can request for protection and the government should extend support. We as filmmakers request all theatre owners of Gujarat to come forward and release the film. We have earned 470 million (both domestic and overseas) in the first week and have lost approximately 6 to 70 million of business in Gujarat. However it's not about money... it is about a principle. As a democratic country where Aamir has a right to say what he feels, even the people of Gujarat, who are protesting have the right to say what they feel ... but in a democratic fashion, and not by burning posters and threatening people."

A single privately owned cinema in Jamnagar, Gujarat, screened the movie with police protection despite the threats. It ran for over a week before being withdrawn again following a self–immolation bid by a man protesting against the screening. The man, Pravin, entered the bathroom of the theatre during intermission of one of the screenings and set himself on fire. He suffered 85% burns and succumbed to his wounds nine days later.

== See also ==
- List of highest–grossing Bollywood films
