= 52nd Filmfare Awards =

2007 awards for Hindi cinema

- Date: 17 February 2007
- Site: Yash Raj Studios
- Hosted by: Shahrukh Khan, Karan Johar, Juhi Chawla, Preity Zinta
- Official website: www.filmfare.com

Highlights
- Best Film: Rang De Basanti
- Critics Award for Best Film: Lage Raho Munna Bhai
- Most awards: Omkara (9)
- Most nominations: Kabhi Alvida Naa Kehna (23)

Television coverage
- Network: Sony Entertainment Television (India)

The 52nd Fair One Filmfare Awards ceremony, presented by The Times Group and Fair One, was one of India's most prestigious awards ceremonies, honoring the best Bollywood films of 2006. It took place on 17 February 2007 at the Yash Raj Studios, Mumbai.

Kabhi Alvida Naa Kehna led the ceremony with 23 nominations, followed by Rang De Basanti with 21 nominations, Omkara with 17 nominations, and Lage Raho Munnabhai with 12 nominations.

Omkara won 9 awards, including Best Actress (Critics) (for Kareena Kapoor), Best Supporting Actress (for Konkona Sen Sharma) and Best Villain (for Saif Ali Khan), thus becoming the most-awarded film at the ceremony.

Both Hrithik Roshan and Shah Rukh Khan received dual nominations for Best Actor, with Roshan being nominated for Dhoom 2 and Krrish, and Khan being nominated for Don: The Chase Begins Again and Kabhi Alvida Naa Kehna, with Roshan winning the category for Dhoom 2.

== Awards and nominees ==
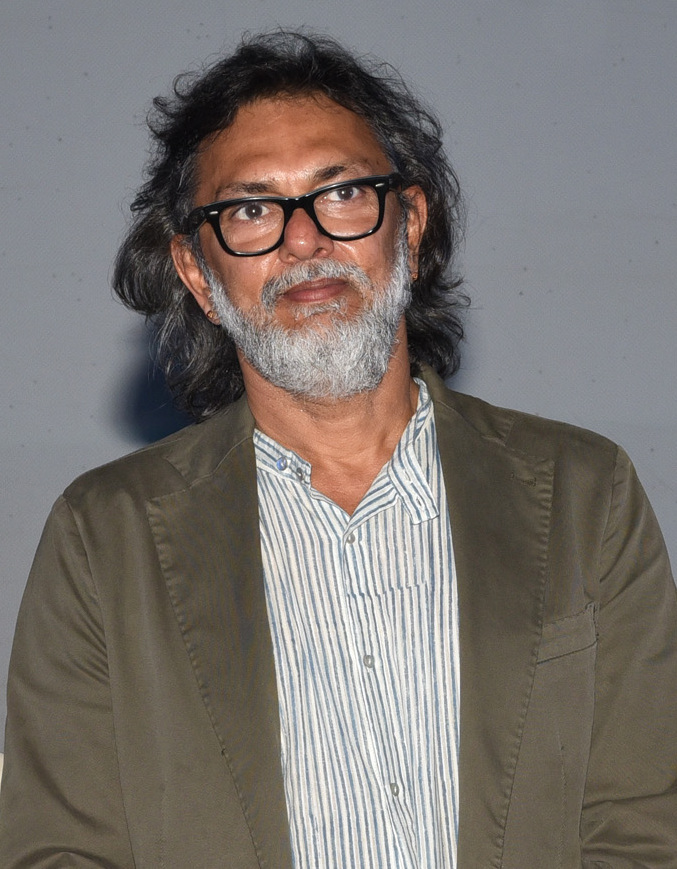
Rakeysh Omprakash Mehra, Best Director winner

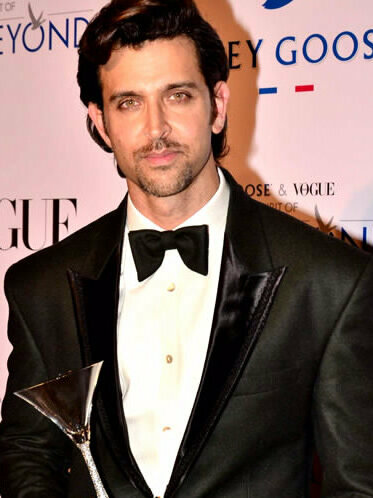
Hrithik Roshan, Best Actor winner

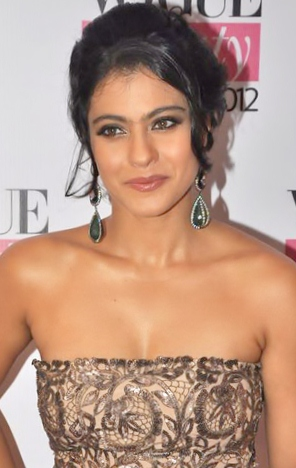
Kajol, Best Actress winner

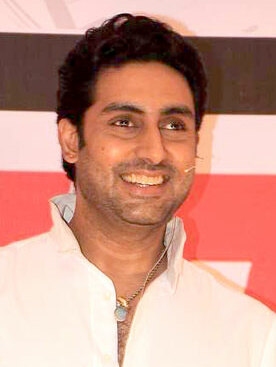
Abhishek Bachchan, Best Supporting Actor winner

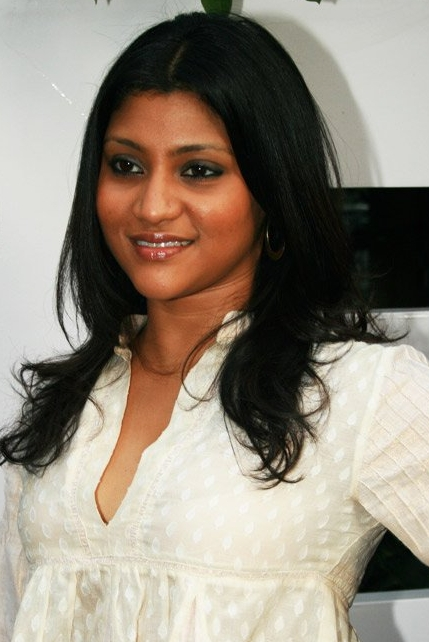
Konkona Sen Sharma, Best Supporting Actor winner

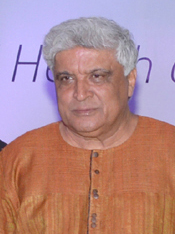
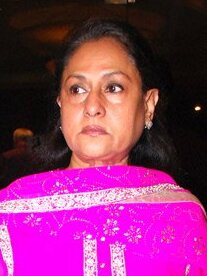
Javed Akhtar and Jaya Bachchan, Lifetime Achievement Awardees

=== Main awards ===
The awards were announced on 8 February 2007.

Best Film	Best Director
Rang De Basanti – Rakeysh Omprakash Mehra Pictures; Dhoom 2 – Yash Raj Films; Don: The Chase Begins Again – Excel Entertainment; Kabhi Alvida Naa Kehna – Dharma Productions; Krrish – Filmkraft Productions Pvt. Ltd.; Lage Raho Munnabhai – Vinod Chopra Films	Rakeysh Omprakash Mehra – Rang De Basanti; Karan Johar – Kabhi Alvida Naa Kehna; Rakesh Roshan – Krrish; Rajkumar Hirani – Lage Raho Munnabhai; Sanjay Gadhvi – Dhoom 2; Vishal Bhardwaj – Omkara
Best Actor	Best Actress
Hrithik Roshan – Dhoom 2 as Aryan / Mr. A; Aamir Khan – Rang De Basanti as Daljit 'DJ' / Chandrashekhar Azad; Hrithik Roshan – Krrish as Krishna Mehra / Krrish / Rohit Mehra; Sanjay Dutt – Lage Raho Munnabhai as Murli Prasad Sharma (Munna Bhai); Shah Rukh Khan – Don: The Chase Begins Again as Don / Vijay; Shah Rukh Khan – Kabhi Alvida Naa Kehna as Dev Saran	Kajol – Fanaa as Zooni Ali Baig; Aishwarya Rai – Dhoom 2 as Sunehri Shinde; Bipasha Basu – Corporate as Nishigandha Dasgupta; Kareena Kapoor – Omkara as Dolly Mishra; Rani Mukerji – Kabhi Alvida Naa Kehna as Maya Talwar
Best Supporting Actor	Best Supporting Actress
Abhishek Bachchan – Kabhi Alvida Naa Kehna as Rishi Talwar; Amitabh Bachchan – Kabhi Alvida Naa Kehna as Samarjit 'Sam' Talwar; John Abraham – Baabul as Rajat Verma; Kunal Kapoor – Rang De Basanti as Aslam / Ashfaqulla Khan; Siddharth Narayan – Rang De Basanti as Karan R. Singhania / Bhagat Singh	Konkona Sen Sharma – Omkara as Indu Tyagi; Kirron Kher – Rang De Basanti as Mitro; Preity Zinta – Kabhi Alvida Naa Kehna as Rhea Saran; Rekha – Krrish as Sonia S. Mehra; Soha Ali Khan – Rang De Basanti as Sonia / Durga Vohra
Best Male Debut	Best Female Debut
Not awarded	Kangana Ranaut – Gangster: A Love Story and Woh Lamhe
Best Villain	Best Comedian
Saif Ali Khan – Omkara as Ishwar "Langda" Tyagi; Boman Irani – Lage Raho Munna Bhai as Lucky Singh; Emraan Hashmi – Gangster as Akash; John Abraham – Zinda as Rohit Chopra; Naseeruddin Shah – Krrish as Dr. Siddhant Arya; Irrfan Khan – The Killer as Vikram/Roopchand Swaroopchand Solanki	Arshad Warsi – Lage Raho Munna Bhai as Sarkeshwar (Circuit); Chunky Pandey – Apna Sapna Money Money; Akshay Kumar - Bhagam Bhag as Bunty; Paresh Rawal – Phir Hera Pheri as Baburao Ganpatrao Apte; Sharman Joshi – Golmaal: Fun Unlimited as Laxman; Tusshar Kapoor – Golmaal: Fun Unlimited as Lucky Gill
Best Music Director	Best Lyricist
A. R. Rahman – Rang De Basanti; Himesh Reshammiya – Aksar; Jatin–Lalit – Fanaa; Pritam – Dhoom 2; Shankar–Ehsaan–Loy – Don: The Chase Begins Again; Shankar–Ehsaan–Loy – Kabhi Alvida Naa Kehna	Prasoon Joshi – "Chand Sifarish" from Fanaa; Gulzar – "Beedi" from Omkara; Javed Akhtar – "Kabhi Alvida Naa Kehna" from Kabhi Alvida Naa Kehna; Javed Akhtar – "Mitwa" from Kabhi Alvida Naa Kehna; Prasoon Joshi – "Roobaroo" from Rang De Basanti
Best Playback Singer – Male	Best Playback Singer – Female
Shaan and Kailash Kher – "Chand Sifarish" from Fanaa; Atif Aslam – "Tere Bin" from Bas Ek Pal; Himesh Reshammiya – "Jhalak Dikhlaja" from Aksar; Sonu Nigam – "Kabhi Alvida Naa Kehna" from Kabhi Alvida Naa Kehna; Zubeen Garg – "Ya Ali" from Gangster: A Love Story	Sunidhi Chauhan – "Beedi" from Omkara; Alka Yagnik – "Kabhi Alvida Naa Kehna" from Kabhi Alvida Naa Kehna; Shreya Ghoshal – "Pal Pal Har Pal" from Lage Raho Munnabhai; Sunidhi Chauhan – "Aashiqui Mein" from 36 China Town; Sunidhi Chauhan – "Soniye" from Aksar

=== Critics' awards ===
Best Film
Lage Raho Munna Bhai (Rajkumar Hirani)
Best Performance
Best Actor	Best Actress
Aamir Khan – Rang De Basanti	Kareena Kapoor – Omkara

=== Technical awards ===
Best Story	Best Screenplay
Vidhu Vinod Chopra and Rajkumar Hirani – Lage Raho Munnabhai; Jaideep Sahni – Khosla Ka Ghosla; Kamlesh Pandey – Rang De Basanti; Kersi Khambatta – Being Cyrus; Mahesh Bhatt – Gangster: A Love Story	Jaideep Sahni – Khosla Ka Ghosla; Anurag Basu – Gangster: A Love Story; Homi Adajania and Kersi Khambatta – Being Cyrus; Vidhu Vinod Chopra, Abhijat Joshi and Rajkumar Hirani – Lage Raho Munnabhai; Rensil D'Silva and Rakeysh Omprakash Mehra – Rang De Basanti
Best Dialogue	Best Editing
Vidhu Vinod Chopra and Rajkumar Hirani – Lage Raho Munnabhai; Girish Dhamija – Gangster: A Love Story; Neeraj Vora – Golmaal: Fun Unlimited; Niranjan Iyengar – Kabhi Alvida Naa Kehna; Prasoon Joshi – Rang De Basanti; Vishal Bhardwaj – Omkara	P. S. Bharati – Rang De Basanti; Akiv Ali – Gangster: A Love Story; John Harris and Anand Subaya – Being Cyrus; Meghna Manchanda – Omkara; Rajkumar Hirani – Lage Raho Munnabhai
Best Choreography	Best Cinematography
Ganesh Acharya – "Beedi" from Omkara; Farah Khan – "Humko Maloom Hai" from Jaan-E-Mann; Farah Khan – "Rock 'N' Roll Soniye" from Kabhi Alvida Naa Kehna; Ganesh Acharya – "Samjho Ho Hi Gaya" from Lage Raho Munna Bhai; Ganesh Acharya – "Paathshala" from Rang De Basanti	Binod Pradhan – Rang De Basanti; Anil Mehta – Kabhi Alvida Naa Kehna; Bobby Singh – Gangster: A Love Story; Jahangir Choudhary – Being Cyrus; Mohanan – Don: The Chase Begins Again; Tassaduq Hussain – Omkara
Best Production Design	Best Sound Design
Samir Chanda – Omkara; Aradhana Seth – Don: The Chase Begins Again; Aparna Raina, Navin Kankre and Shekhar More – Being Cyrus; Samir Chanda – Rang De Basanti; Sharmishta Roy – Kabhi Alvida Naa Kehna	Shajith Koyeri, Subash Sahu and K.J. Singh – Omkara; Akiv Ali – Gangster: A Love Story; Andrew Bellety – Being Cyrus; Jeetendra Choudhary, Baylon Fonsecai and Nakul Kamre – Krrish; Nakul Kamre – Rang De Basanti
Best Costume Design	Best Background Score
Dolly Ahluwalia – Omkara; Aki Narula – Don: The Chase Begins Again; Anaita Shroff Adajania – Being Cyrus; Lovleen Bains and Arjun Bhasin – Rang De Basanti; M. P. Karthik and Komal Shahani – Dor	Salim–Sulaiman – Krrish; A. R. Rahman – Rang De Basanti; Julius Packiam – Kabul Express; Salim–Sulaiman – Dhoom 2; Vishal Bhardwaj – Omkara
Best Special Effects	Best Action
EFX – Krrish; Red Chillies VFX – Don: The Chase Begins Again; Tata Elxsi – Dhoom 2; Prime Focus – Jaan-E-Mann; Pankaj Khandpur – Rang De Basanti	Tony Ching and Siu-Tung – Krrish; Allan Amin – Dhoom 2; Angelo Samn – Don: The Chase Begins Again; Jai Singh – Omkara; Parvez Kiran – Gangster: A Love Story

=== Special awards ===
Lifetime Achievement Award
Javed Akhtar	Jaya Bachchan
R. D. Burman Award
Naresh Iyer
Special Performance Award
Deepak Dobriyal – Omkara
Power Award
Yash Chopra	Aditya Chopra

== Superlatives ==
Film	Awards	Nominations
Omkara	9	17
Rang De Basanti	6	21
Lage Raho Munnabhai	4	12
Krrish	3	8
Fanaa	3	4
Kabhi Alvida Naa Kehna	1	18
Dhoom 2	1	8
Khosla Ka Ghosla	1	2
Gangster: A Love Story	1	10
Don: The Chase Begins Again	0	9
Being Cyrus	0	7
Golmaal: Fun Unlimited	0	3
Aksar	0	3
Jaan-E-Mann	0	2

== See also ==
- Filmfare Awards
- List of Filmfare Award records
- List of highest-grossing Bollywood films

== Sources ==
- Watch 52nd Filmfare Awards Online, youtube.com
