= Shibani Bathija =

Indian screenwriter

- Occupation: Screenwriter

Shibani Bathija is an Indian screenwriter known for her works in Bollywood films. Bathija studied English at DePauw University and Communications at San Francisco State.

After a period in advertising with Sony, Bathija showed a script to filmmaker Karan Johar, which was then accepted by Yash Raj Films. She served as screenwriter for two major 2006 releases, Kunal Kohli's romantic thriller Fanaa and Johar's ensemble musical romantic drama Kabhi Alvida Naa Kehna, the latter of which earned her a nomination for the Filmfare Award for Best Screenplay (jointly with Johar). Her films also include Sanjay Gadhvi's action drama Kidnap (2008) and Johar's social drama My Name Is Khan (2010).
