= Kirron Kher =

Indian actress and politician (born 1952)

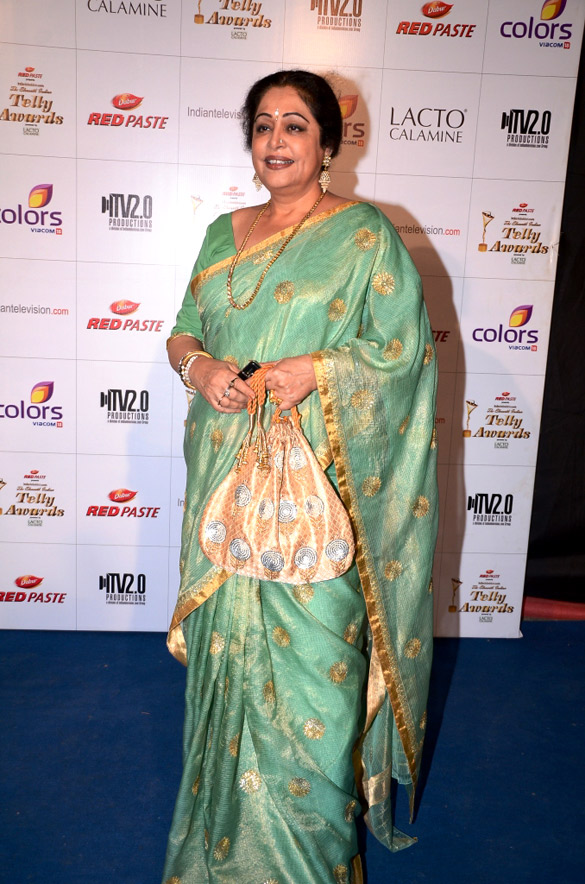
- Kher at Indian Telly Awards in 2012

Member of Parliament, Lok Sabha
- In office 16 May 2014 – 4 June 2024
- Preceded by: Pawan Kumar Bansal
- Succeeded by: Manish Tewari
- Constituency: Chandigarh

Personal details
- Born: Kiran Thakar Singh Sandhu; 14 June 1952 (age 74) Bangalore, Mysore State, India
- Party: Bharatiya Janata Party
- Spouses: Gautam Berry (m. 1979; div. 1985) Anupam Kher (m. 1985)
- Children: Sikandar Kher
- Occupation: Actress; television personality; entertainment producer; singer; politician; socio-political activist

Kirron Anupam Kher (also Kiran or, Kiron, born 14 June 1952) is an Indian politician, former actress, television personality, singer, and entertainment producer known for her work in Hindi films and television. She is a member of the Bharatiya Janata Party and was a Member of Parliament in the Lok Sabha, the lower house of Indian Parliament, from Chandigarh, from 2014 to 2024. Through her film career, she is the recipient of two National Film Awards and a Lux Style Award, and has received four Filmfare Award nominations.

== Early life ==
Kiran Singh was born on 14 June 1952 in Bangalore, Mysore State, India into a Punjabi Sikh family and grew up in Chandigarh. During the period of her first marriage to Gautam Berry, she was known as 'Kiran Berry'. When she married Anupam Kher, she resumed her maiden name and also added her latest husband's surname, being known as 'Kiran Thakar Singh Kher'. In later life, she developed a firm belief in numerology, and in 2003 (aged 51), she changed her name from "Kiran" to "Kirron" based on numerological calculations, dropped her maiden names, and came to be known as 'Kirron Kher.' She is sometimes known as 'Grandma India.'

Kirron has one brother and two sisters. Her brother, the artist Amardeep Singh Sandhu, died in 2003. One of her sisters is the Arjuna Award–winning badminton player, Kanwal Thakar Kaur. Her other sister, Sharanjit Kaur Sandhu, is the wife of a retired senior officer of the Indian Navy.

Kirron went to school in Jabalpur, Madhya Pradesh, and completed her school education in Chandigarh, and then graduated from the Department of Indian Theatre of Panjab University, Chandigarh.

== Career ==
Kirron made her film debut in 1983 in the Punjabi feature film Aasra Pyar Da. After this, she took a hiatus from films until 1996. Between 1983 and 1996, she appeared in one film, Pestonjee (1987), in which she acted in a small role alongside her second husband Anupam Kher.

Her return to acting came in the mid–1990s, through theatre, with the play Saalgirah written by playwright Javed Siddiqui and directed by Feroz Abbas Khan. She then hosted three television shows, starting with the short–lived Purushkshetra on Zee TV which got attention for bringing out the discussion of alternative sexuality for the first time, while also highlighting women's issues. Kirron Kher Today and Jagte Raho with Kirron Kher, before doing Hindi films.

Her comeback film was Sardari Begum (1996), directed by Shyam Benegal. Her performance received high critical acclaim and earned her the National Film Award – Special Jury Award (feature film).

She then appeared in film director Rituparno Ghosh's Bengali film Bariwali (1999), to critical acclaim. When she won the National Film Award for Best Actress for the film, a controversy arose as a Bangla film actress, Rita Koiral, claimed that she had dubbed for the character of Kirron, making her an equal claimant to the award. Kirron refuted the charges claiming she spent hours rehearsing for her dialogue delivery, and the award was eventually not shared.

In 2002, Kher appeared in Sanjay Leela Bhansali's period romantic drama Devdas (2002), alongside Shahrukh Khan, Aishwarya Rai and Madhuri Dixit in which her performance received widespread critical acclaim, receiving her first nomination for the Filmfare Award for Best Supporting Actress.

In Khamosh Pani (Silent Waters) (2003), a film that portrays the plight of a woman abducted during partition of India, her character not only refused to kill herself as suggested by her family, but marries her abductor and, after his death, makes an earning teaching Quran to local children. It shows how her life changes dramatically when her son takes up Islamic extremism in 1979 during the rule of Zia–ul–Haq and his process of Islamization of Pakistan. She won the Best Actress Award at the Locarno International Film Festival, Switzerland, the Karachi International Film Festival, Karachi, and International Festivals at Ciepie in Argentina, and Cape Town in South Africa while the film won the Best Film – Golden Leopard, Festival Grand Prize at Locarno.

The 2004 Indian Film Festival of Los Angeles (IFFLA) paid tribute to Kher during its annual festival.

In October 2004, Kher made a guest appearance, along with her husband, in the American TV series ER playing Parminder Nagra's mother, Mrs. Rasgotra, in the episode "Damaged".

In 2005, she played the role of Sunanda in the tele-serial Prratima on Sahara One channel, before which she had appeared in TV series like Dil Na Jaane Kyon (Zee TV), Isi Bahane, and Chausath Panne.

Despite playing mostly supporting roles, her successful films include Main Hoon Na (2004), Hum Tum (2004), Veer-Zaara (2004), and Mangal Pandey: The Rising (2005), where her performance drew rave reviews. Her work in Rang De Basanti (2006) was also acclaimed with her performance earning her a second nomination for the Filmfare Award for Best Supporting Actress. Her role in Fanaa (2006) and Kabhi Alvida Naa Kehna (2006) also received appreciation, receiving her third nomination for the Filmfare Award for Best Supporting Actress for the latter.

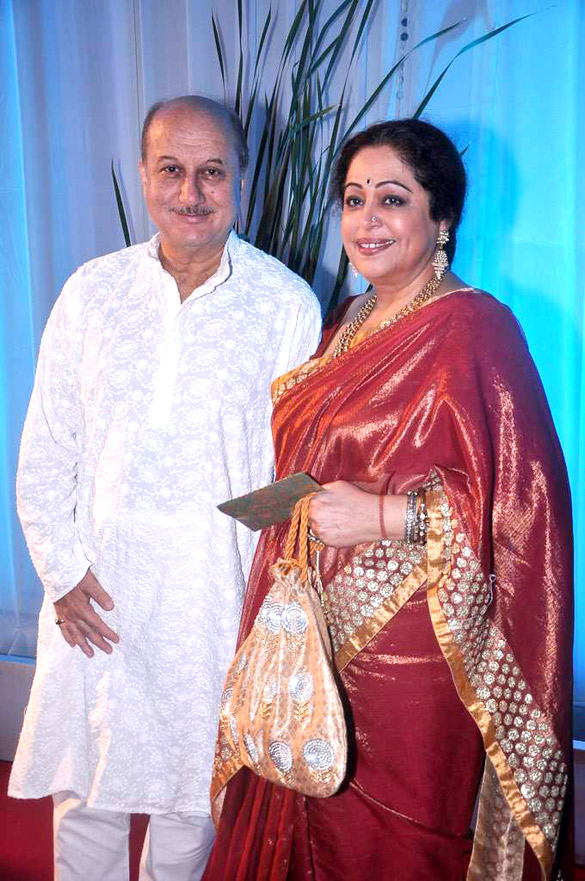
Kirron with husband Anupam in 2012

Adding to her list of comical roles in 2008 she appeared in Singh Is Kinng, Saas Bahu Aur Sensex and Dostana, receiving her fourth nomination for the Filmfare Award for Best Supporting Actress for the lattermost. In 2009, she appeared as judge on India's Got Talent, the Indian franchise of the Got Talent series.

== Socio-political activism ==
Kirron Kher has been involved with non-profit movements such as Laadli (a campaign against female infanticide) and Roko Cancer (a campaign for awareness of cancer). She joined the Bhartiya Janata Party in 2009. She campaigned for the party in across the country during the elections, including in Chandigarh for the 2011 municipal corporation elections. She has been a vocal admirer of BJP's Prime Ministerial candidate Narendra Modi since long before his candidature was announced. Bharatiya Janata Party(BJP) declared her as the Lok Sabha candidate from Chandigarh for General Elections, 2014. Subsequently, in May 2014, she won the seat with 1,91,362 votes, defeating sitting MP, Congress leader Pawan Bansal who received 1,21,720 votes, while AAP's Gul Panag came in third position with 1,08,679 votes.

As a Member of parliament from Chandigarh and having connection with the film industry, Kirron promised a film city for Chandigarh. After winning the seat, she said that she had difficulty in acquiring land in Chandigarh. However, her proposal was accepted by the Chandigarh Administration and the film city is proposed to be set up in Sarangpur, Chandigarh.

Kirron Kher, BJP candidate, won in 2019 Indian general election Chandigarh constituency by a margin of 46,970 votes.

== Controversy ==
After a woman was gang raped by an auto rickshaw driver and his accomplices in Chandigarh in 2017, she suggested that women should avoid traveling with strangers, earning widespread criticism from the opposition and social media.

== Personal life ==
Kirron married Gautam Berry, a Mumbai–based businessman, in first week of March 1979, and had a son, Sikandar Kher.

In Mumbai, Kirron tried throughout the 1980s to get a foothold in the film industry, but without success. While visiting producer after producer seeking a role in films, Kirron renewed her acquaintance with Anupam Kher, who was also a similarly struggling actor, and whom she had known slightly at university in Chandigarh. Moving in the same theatre circles, they worked together in a play called Chandpuri Ki Champabai. In 1985, Kirron divorced her first husband amd married Kher on 26 August 1985.

In 2020, she was diagnosed with multiple myeloma.

== Filmography ==
- Note: all films are in Hindi, unless otherwise noted.

Year	Film	Role	Notes
1983	Aasra Pyaar Da	Sheela	Punjabi film
1988	Pestonjee	Soona Mistry	credited as Kirron Thakursingh–Kher
1996	Sardari Begum	Sardari Begum	National Film Award – Special Jury Award (feature film)
1997	Darmiyaan: In Between	Zeenat Begum	
1999	Bariwali	Banalata	Bengali film; National Film Award for Best Actress
2001	Ehsaas: The Feeling	Antra's mother	
2002	Devdas	Sumitra Chakraborty	Nominated – Filmfare Award for Best Supporting Actress
2002	Karz: The Burden of Truth	Savitri Devi	
2004	Khamosh Pani	Veero/Ayesha Khan	Indo-Pakistani Punjabi film; Lux Style Award for Best Film Actress
2004	Main Hoon Na	Madhu Sharma	
2004	Hum Tum	Parminder 'Bobby' Prakash	
2004	Veer–Zaara	Mariam Hayaat Khan	
2005	Mangal Pandey: The Rising	Lol Bibi	
2005	It Could Be You	Mrs. Dhillon	English film
2006	Rang De Basanti	Mitro (DJ's Mother)	Nominated – Filmfare Award for Best Supporting Actress
2006	Fanaa	Nafisa Ali Begum (Zooni's mother)	
2006	Kabhi Alvida Naa Kehna	Kamaljit 'Kamal' Saran	Nominated – Filmfare Award for Best Supporting Actress
2006	I See You	Mrs. Dutt	
2007	Just Married	Shobha Chaturvedi	
2007	Apne	Raavi B. Choudhary	
2007	Om Shanti Om	Bela Makhija	
2008	Singh Is Kinng	Rose Lady	
2008	Saas Bahu Aur Sensex	Binita Sen	
2008	Dostana	Mrs. Seema Acharya	Nominated – Filmfare Award for Best Supporting Actress
2009	Kambakkht Ishq	Aunt Dolly	
2009	Kurbaan	Nasreen Aapa	
2010	Milenge Milenge	Tarot Card Reader	
2010	Action Replayy	Bholi Devi	
2011	Mummy Punjabi	Baby R. Arora	
2012	Ajab Gazabb Love	Rashmi Grewal	
2014	Gunday	Courtesan	Deleted scene
2014	Total Siyapaa	Asha's mother	
2014	Khoobsurat	Manju	
2014	Punjab 1984	Satwant Kaur	Punjabi film

=== Television ===
Year	Program	Language	Role	Notes
1988	Isi Bahane	Hindi		
1999	Gubbare	Hindi		
1999–2000	Kanyadaan	Hindi		
2004	Prratima	Hindi	Sunanda Sukumar Roy	
2004	ER	English	Mrs. Rasgotra	Episode: "Damaged"
2009–2023	India's Got Talent	Hindi	Judge	

== Awards and nominations ==
- 1997: National Film Award – Special Jury Award (feature film): Sardari Begum
- 2000: National Film Award for Best Actress: Bariwali
- 2003: Filmfare Award for Best Supporting Actress: Devdas (Nominated)
- 2003: IIFA Award for Best Supporting Actress: Devdas
- 2003: Screen Award for Best Supporting Actress: Devdas (Nominated)
- 2003: Bollywood Movie Award for Best Supporting Actress: Devdas
- 2003: Sansui Viewers' Choice Movie Award for Best Supporting Actress: Devdas (Nominated)
- 2003: Locarno International Film Festival: Best Actress: Khamosh Pani (Silent Waters)
- 2003: Karachi International Film Festival: Best Female Actor in a Leading Role: Khamosh Pani (Silent Waters)
- 2003: Lux Style Award for Best Film Actress: Khamosh Pani (Silent Waters)
- 2005: Screen Award for Best Supporting Actress: Hum Tum (Nominated)
- 2005: Zee Cine Award for Best Actor in a Supporting Role – Female: Hum Tum (Nominated)
- 2005: Producers Guild Film Award for Best Actress in a Supporting Role: Hum Tum (Nominated)
- 2005: Stardust Award for Best Supporting Actress: Veer-Zaara
- 2007: Filmfare Award for Best Supporting Actress: Kabhi Alvida Naa Kehna (Nominated)
- 2007: IIFA Award for Best Supporting Actress: Kabhi Alvida Naa Kehna (Nominated)
- 2007: Filmfare Award for Best Supporting Actress: Rang De Basanti (Nominated)
- 2007: IIFA Award for Best Supporting Actress: Rang De Basanti (Nominated)
- 2007: Screen Award for Best Supporting Actress: Rang De Basanti
- 2007: Zee Cine Award for Best Actor in a Supporting Role – Female: Rang De Basanti (Nominated)
- 2007: Stardust Award for Best Supporting Actress: Rang De Basanti (Nominated)
- 2007: Bollywood Movie Award for Best Supporting Actress: Rang De Basanti
- 2009: Filmfare Award for Best Supporting Actress: Dostana (Nominated)
- 2009: IIFA Award for Best Supporting Actress: Dostana (Nominated)
- 2010: Stardust Award for Best Supporting Actress: Dostana (Nominated)
- 2010: Stardust Award for Best Supporting Actress: Kurbaan
- 2010: Producers Guild Film Award for Best Actress in a Supporting Role: Kurbaan
- 2015: PTC Punjabi Film Awards: Best Actress (Critics): Punjab 1984

Lok Sabha
Preceded by Pawan Kumar Bansal	Member of Parliament for Chandigarh; 2014	Incumbent
