= Kabhi Alvida Naa Kehna =

2006 Indian film by Karan Johar

- Theatrical release poster
- Directed by: Karan Johar
- Screenplay by: Karan Johar; Shibani Bathija
- Dialogues by: Niranjan Iyengar
- Story by: Karan Johar
- Produced by: Hiroo Yash Johar
- Starring: Amitabh Bachchan; Shah Rukh Khan; Abhishek Bachchan; Rani Mukerji; Preity Zinta; Kirron Kher
- Cinematography: Anil Mehta
- Edited by: Sanjay Sankla
- Music by: Shankar–Ehsaan–Loy
- Production company: Dharma Productions
- Distributed by: Yash Raj Films
- Release date: 11 August 2006
- Running time: 192 minutes
- Country: India
- Language: Hindi
- Budget: ₹50 crore (equivalent to ₹175 crore or US$19 million in 2026)
- Box office: ₹113 crore (equivalent to ₹396 crore or US$42 million in 2026)

Kabhi Alvida Naa Kehna (transl. Never Say Goodbye), also abbreviated as KANK, is a 2006 Indian Hindi-language romantic drama film written and directed by Karan Johar and produced by Hiroo Yash Johar under Dharma Productions. The film stars Amitabh Bachchan, Shah Rukh Khan, Abhishek Bachchan, Rani Mukerji, Preity Zinta and Kirron Kher. Set primarily in New York City, the narrative explores themes of marital infidelity, emotional dissatisfaction, and dysfunctional relationships, and was promoted with the tagline "A Love... That Broke All Relationships." The film marked a notable departure from Johar's earlier family-centric dramas, opting for a more mature and controversial storyline.

The film follows Dev and Maya, two individuals in unhappy marriages who form a deep emotional connection that develops into an extramarital affair, challenging conventional ideas of love and commitment. Principal photography took place over a 90-day schedule across various locations in the United States, with cinematography by Anil Mehta. The film's soundtrack was composed by Shankar–Ehsaan–Loy, with lyrics by Javed Akhtar.

Released theatrically in India on 11 August 2006, the film received mixed-to-positive reviews. While its portrayal of infidelity drew criticism, the performances, cinematography, dialogues, costume design, and music were widely praised. The film emerged as the fourth highest-grossing Hindi film of 2006 in India and, at the time, the highest-grossing Indian film in overseas markets, grossing ₹1.13 billion (US$37 million) worldwide. The film was released in over 1,200 cinemas across more than 20 countries—one of the widest international releases for a Hindi film at the time—and was screened at the 31st Toronto International Film Festival and the 19th Tokyo International Film Festival.

The film received multiple accolades and led the 52nd Filmfare Awards with 23 nominations, including Best Film, Best Director (Johar), Best Actor (Khan), Best Actress (Mukerji) and Best Supporting Actress (Zinta), winning Best Supporting Actor for Abhishek Bachchan. Marking his third consecutive award in the category, he became the only actor after Dilip Kumar to hattrick at the Filmfare Awards.

== Plot ==
Dev Saran, a professional soccer player in New York City, lives with his wife Rhea, son Arjun, and widowed mother, Kamaljit ("Kamal"). Maya, a schoolteacher and orphan, is preparing to marry her closest friend, Rishi Talwar, who was raised by his wealthy and flamboyant father who is also a widower, Samarjit ("Sam"). On the day of her wedding, Maya meets Dev by chance. Though strangers, they form an immediate emotional connection. As he leaves, Dev is hit by a car, which ends his athletic career.

Four years later, Dev is embittered by his lost career and insecure about Rhea's growing success as a fashion magazine editor. He works as a junior soccer coach but struggles to bond with Arjun, who would rather play the violin. Maya feels emotionally disconnected from Rishi and struggles with her infertility. After Sam and Kamal befriend each other, Dev and Maya reconnect and develop a friendship based on shared marital frustrations. As Rhea and Rishi begin working together, Dev and Maya grow closer and (hilariously) attempt to repair their marriages, but without success. Their relationship intensifies.

After the couple's anniversary dinners, things come to a head. Rhea reveals she was offered a promotion in London and Dev, assuming she accepted it, accuses her of being self-centered and showing off. Hurt, Rhea reveals she turned it down for the sake of their family and confronts Dev over his resentment and detachment. Meanwhile, Rishi expresses frustration with Maya's emotional distance and her inability to have children.

Dev and Maya meet at a train station and confess their love. They begin an affair but struggle with guilt as their spouses try to save their marriages. Their secret is exposed when Sam and Kamal discover them in an embrace. That night, Sam suffers a fatal heart attack. On his deathbed, he urges Maya to leave Rishi so they can both pursue happiness. After Sam's death, Dev and Maya decide to end their affair and go back to their spouses, but first they must confess to them the truth about their extramarital affairs because neither of them will be able to move on in the shadow of lies. Shocked, Rhea and Rishi divorce them, though Kamal remains with Rhea and Arjun. Dev and Maya part ways, each pretending to have moved on as Maya relocates to Philadelphia. Rhea is happy with Arjun as Dev, Maya, and Rishi are alone and depressed.

Three years later, Rishi visits Maya, revealing that he has forgiven her and is remarrying. At his wedding, Maya encounters Rhea (who is also friends with Rishi's second wife), who is now dating her boss, Jai. Rhea and Rishi encourage Maya to find Dev. Learning he is leaving for Toronto, she rushes to the train station. Dev sees her but avoids contact, believing she is still with Rishi. As the train departs, however, he notices Maya's tears, pulls the emergency brake, and they reconcile. In a closing voiceover, Dev reflects that although he and Maya found happiness together, they continue to carry the guilt of the pain they caused along the way.

== Cast ==
- Shah Rukh Khan as Dev Saran – Rhea's husband, Arjun's father, and Kamaljit's son.
- Abhishek Bachchan as Rishi Talwar – Maya's husband and Samarjit's son
- Rani Mukerji as Maya Talwar – Rishi's wife and Samarjit's daughter-in-law
- Preity Zinta as Rhea Saran – Dev's wife, Arjun's mother, and Kamaljit's daughter-in-law.
- Amitabh Bachchan as Samarjit "Sam" Talwar – Rishi's father and Maya's father-in-law.
- Kirron Kher as Kamaljit "Kamal" Saran – Dev's mother, Rhea's mother-in-law, and Arjun's grandmother.
- Ahsaas Channa as Arjun Saran – Dev and Rhea's son and Kamaljit's grandson.
- Arjun Rampal as Jai Mehra – Rhea's boss.
- Saira Mohan as Catherine Talwar – Rishi's colleague and second wife, and Rhea and Jai's friend.

=== Cameo appearances ===
- Kajol in a special appearance in the song "Rock 'N' Roll Soniye".
- John Abraham as a DJ in the song "Where’s The Party Tonight?".
- Karan Johar as a train passenger in the final sequence.
- Ayan Mukerji as a train passenger in the song "Tumhi Dekho Naa".
- Tarun Mansukhani (uncredited) as Rishi's colleague.

== Production ==
=== Development ===
Initially titled Kalank, the film was eventually renamed after the lyric Kabhi Alvida Naa Kehna from the Kishore Kumar song “Chalte Chalte Mere Yeh Geet Yaad Rakhna” featured in the 1976 film Chalte Chalte. This title was also initially considered for Karan Johar's 2003 film Kal Ho Naa Ho, which he wrote and was briefly supposed to direct but instead marked the directorial debut of Nikhil Advani. The title Kalank was eventually retained by Johar for a 2019 film of the same name he produced alongside Sajid Nadiadwala and Fox Star Studios, which was directed by Abhishek Varman and was envisioned by him in 2004.

The film was written and directed by Johar on the basis of his original story and a screenplay he developed alongside writer Shibani Bathija, who later provided the story for Kalank. The dialogues were penned by Niranjan Iyengar.

Johar drew inspiration from real-life experiences and cinematic influences. He cited witnessing a married couple part amicably at a London café, his own emotional setbacks, and the Richard Linklater film Before Sunset (2004) as key triggers that shaped the story's emotional depth and unconventional premise.

The project was produced by Hiroo Yash Johar, marking her debut as a producer under the Dharma Productions banner. Long-time collaborators Farah Khan (choreography), Manish Malhotra (costume design), and Sharmishta Roy (production design) returned to shape the film's visual aesthetic, continuing their creative association with Johar. MAC Cosmetics contributed significantly to the styling and makeup for the principal cast.

Continuing a trend seen in Johar's previous works—Kuch Kuch Hota Hai (1998), Kabhi Khushi Kabhie Gham... (2001) and Kal Ho Naa Ho (2003)—the film featured a four-word title beginning with the letter “K.”

=== Casting ===
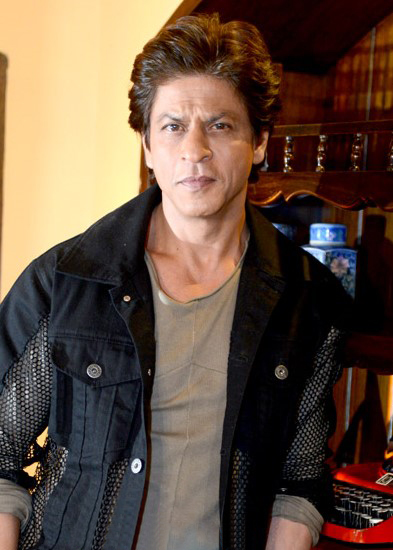
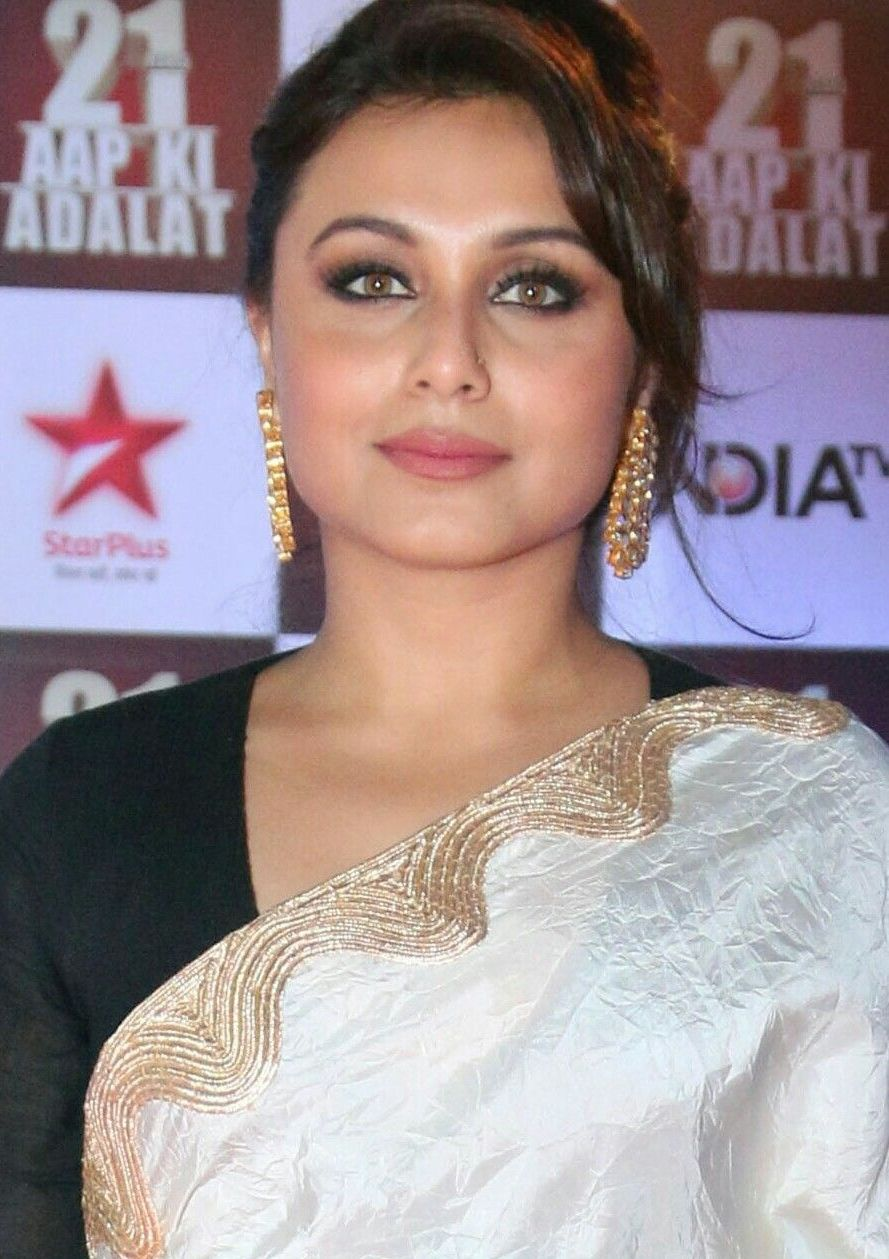
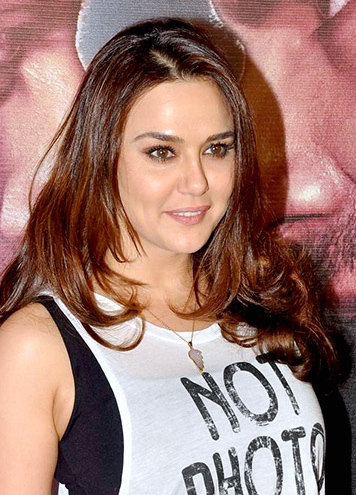
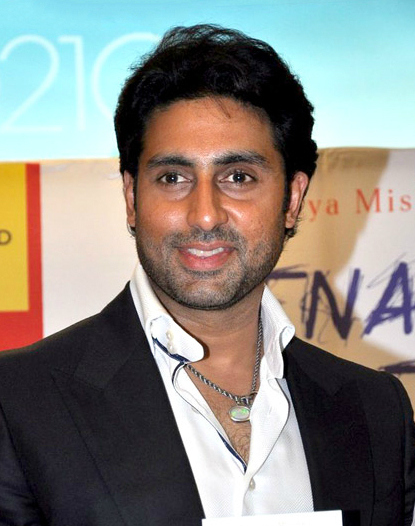
The film starred Shah Rukh Khan, Rani Mukerji, Preity Zinta, and Abhishek Bachchan in lead roles.

Director Karan Johar initially intended to cast Shah Rukh Khan, Kajol, Rani Mukerji, and Ajay Devgn in the principal roles of Dev, Maya, Rhea, and Rishi, respectively. However, both Devgn and Saif Ali Khan declined the film due to their prior commitments to Vishal Bhardwaj's Omkara (2006), in which they played leading roles. Saif had previously collaborated with Johar on Kal Ho Naa Ho (2003) after Salman Khan declined the role of Rohit because he did not wish to "play second fiddle". Johar subsequently cast Abhishek Bachchan as Rishi after being impressed by his performance in Yuva (2004), marking Bachchan's first official collaboration with Dharma Productions after initially shooting for a cameo appearance in Kabhi Khushi Kabhie Gham... (2001) which was edited out of the film.

The role of Maya was initially offered to Kajol, which was intended to mark her return to cinema after a five-year hiatus from full time acting following Kabhi Khushi Kabhie Gham... (2001) and a cameo appearance in Kal Ho Naa Ho (2003). She declined the part due to creative disagreements and a prior commitment to Yash Raj Films' Fanaa (2006), which she found more compelling. In an episode of Koffee with Karan, Kajol also expressed discomfort with the film's treatment of extramarital relationships, stating, “Yes, there were some points I disagreed with. As a woman... I feel when you get married, you should want to work on it.” Despite turning down the role, she made a cameo appearance in the song “Rock 'N' Roll Soniye.”

Following Kajol's departure, Mukerji—who was originally cast as Rhea—was recast in the role of Maya, which she later described as “a turning point” in her life. Preity Zinta—who had previously collaborated with Johar on Kal Ho Naa Ho (2003) after Kareena Kapoor refused the role of Naina due to a salary dispute with Johar—was subsequently brought in to portray Rhea, describing the role as a deliberate shift from her typically vivacious screen image: “I play this cold woman,” she explained, “which wasn’t easy for a warm person like me to do.” Ameesha Patel was also considered for the role but declined due to scheduling conflicts.

Amitabh Bachchan and Kirron Kher were cast as Samarjit ("Sam"), Rishi's father, and Kamaljit ("Kamal"), Dev's mother, respectively. Arjun Rampal was cast as Jai Mehra, Rhea's boss, replacing earlier considerations for John Abraham. Despite this, Abraham was later featured in a cameo as a DJ in the song “Where’s the Party Tonight?” Director Tarun Mansukhani also made a cameo appearance as one of Rishi's friends.

The role of Dev and Rhea's young son, Arjun, was portrayed by Ahsaas Channa, a female child actor known for convincingly playing young boys in earlier projects. The decision was considered unconventional, but her performance was well received.

Riteish Deshmukh and Aryan Khan, Shah Rukh Khan's son, filmed cameo appearances that were ultimately removed during editing. Additionally, both Johar and his assistant director Ayan Mukerji appeared briefly on screen—Johar in the film's final train sequence seated behind Shah Rukh Khan, and Mukerji in the “Tumhi Dekho Naa” montage, where he stepped in as an extra due to a shortage of background performers. He appears wearing a green sweater and carrying gift boxes.

Notably, the principal cast—excluding Abhishek Bachchan—had previously worked together in Yash Chopra's Veer-Zaara (2004).

=== Filming ===
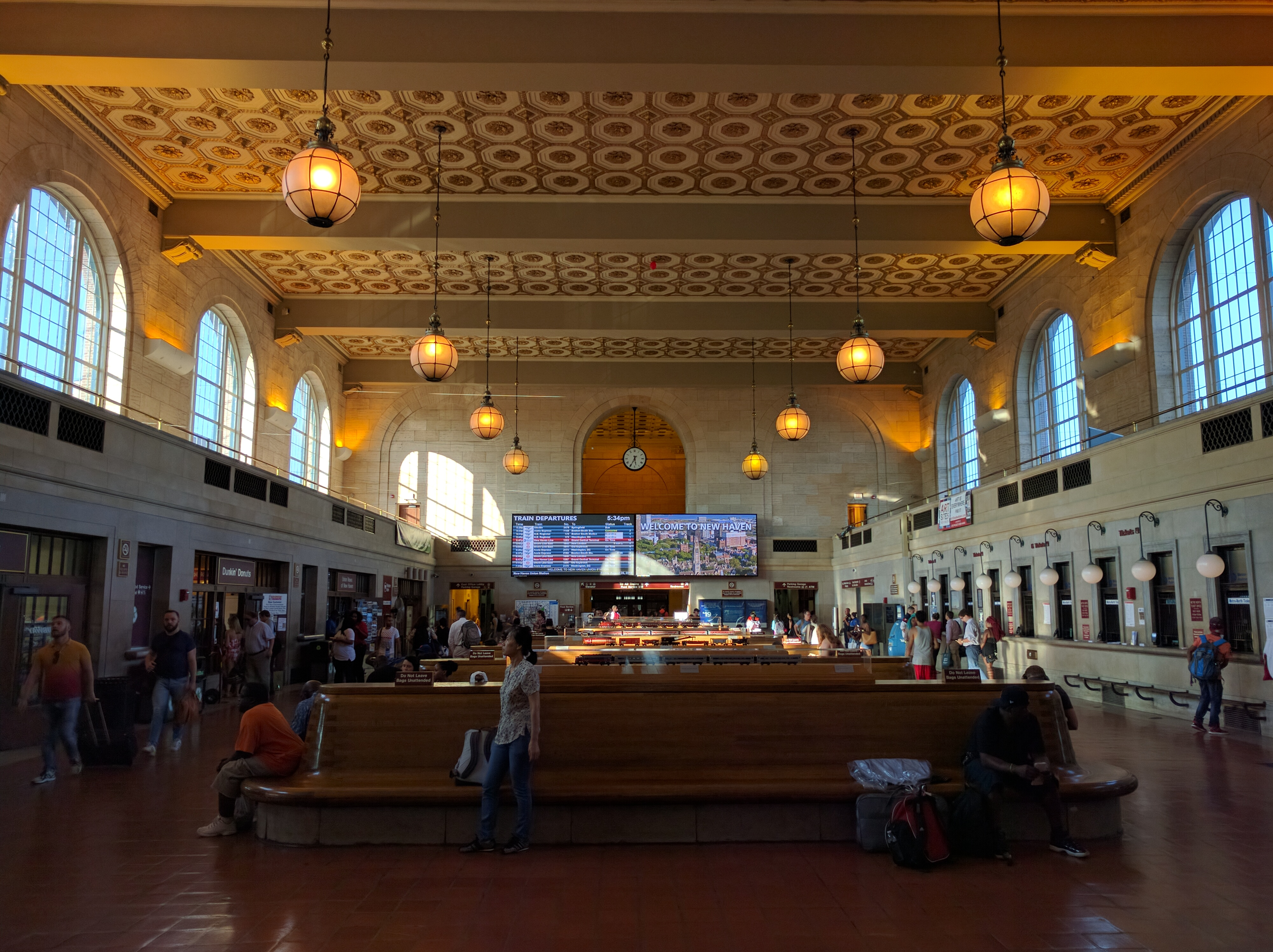
A major portion of the film was shot at the Union Station in New Haven.

Although Kabhi Alvida Naa Kehna is set in New York City, a significant portion of the film was shot in the United States, primarily in Connecticut. Key scenes were filmed in East Hartford and New Haven, including a soccer game sequence at Rentschler Field, home to the UConn Huskies football team, with the stadium's "UConn" logo visible in several shots. Scenes intended to depict Grand Central Terminal were filmed at New Haven's Union Station and Philadelphia’s 30th Street Station. The film was primarily shot over 90 days in the United States, with additional scenes completed on four custom-built sets in Mumbai. During the U.S. shoot, Rani Mukerji reportedly suffered from a severe skin allergy due to extreme weather conditions.

One of the most challenging sequences to film was the song “Tumhi Dekho Naa,” which was shot across several iconic locations in and around New York City. Each color-themed segment corresponded to a specific location: blue at Columbia University, yellow at Wall Street, orange at Bear Mountain State Park, pink at St. Patrick's Cathedral, red at Pier A Park in Hoboken, New Jersey, and green at Union Station in New Haven. The red sequence was originally meant to include artificial rain, but freezing temperatures caused water droplets to turn into ice mid-air, creating safety risks. Instead, the scene was filmed on a sunny day using two hundred red umbrellas. The green segment faced a shortage of extras, requiring crew members—including assistant director Ayan Mukerji—to fill in.

The freezing temperatures during the New York schedule caused further complications. During the same song, temperatures dropped to –14 °C (7 °F), causing significant discomfort for Mukerji, who was dressed in a chiffon saree. The conditions were so harsh that she was unable to walk unassisted and had to be carried to her vehicle by her cousin Ayan Mukerji. Despite these challenges, director Karan Johar continued the shoot as planned, making only minor adjustments to ensure safety.

Due to a scheduling conflict, Johar delegated the direction of a key hotel scene to Shah Rukh Khan. Initially reluctant, Khan completed the sequence with remote guidance from Amitabh Bachchan over the phone.

== Themes and analysis ==
Kabhi Alvida Naa Kehna explores themes of marital infidelity, emotional dissatisfaction, and the complexities of modern relationships. The narrative follows Dev and Maya, both in unfulfilling marriages, who develop a deep emotional connection that leads to an extramarital affair. The film examines the notion of encountering a soulmate after marriage and the resulting emotional and familial consequences.

Director Karan Johar cited a real-life incident he witnessed in London, where a couple amicably ended their marriage, as a key inspiration for the story. This event, combined with thematic elements from Richard Linklater's Before Sunset (2004), motivated Johar to explore the deeper dynamics of love, commitment, and the consequences of relationship choices.

Johar addressed criticisms suggesting that the film glorifies infidelity, clarifying that his intention was not to endorse extramarital affairs but to portray the emotional turmoil and consequences involved. In interviews, he emphasized that the film reflects the emotional complexity of contemporary relationships and the importance of understanding one's personal needs.

The film's themes align with earlier works such as Yash Chopra's Silsila (1981) and Mahesh Bhatt's Arth (1982), both of which tackled similar subject matter. Comparisons have also been drawn with Mike Nichols' Closer (2004) and Johar's own production Gehraiyaan (2022), directed by Shakun Batra, for their exploration of romantic conflict and moral ambiguity.

== Soundtrack ==
The soundtrack of Kabhi Alvida Naa Kehna was composed by Shankar–Ehsaan–Loy, with lyrics by Javed Akhtar. It marked their second collaboration with director Karan Johar after Kal Ho Naa Ho (2003). The soundtrack was released in the United Kingdom on 12 June 2006 and officially launched in India on 16 June 2006 during the 7th IIFA Awards in Dubai. The album received widespread acclaim for its melodies, modern arrangements, and thematic resonance, particularly the songs "Kabhi Alvida Naa Kehna", "Mitwa", and "Tumhi Dekho Naa", which became chart-topping hits.

The soundtrack achieved strong commercial performance upon release. It debuted at number one on Indian music charts and remained at the top position for ten consecutive weeks. Competing with other popular soundtracks such as Fanaa, Krrish, and Gangster: A Love Story, it sold approximately 1.9 million units, according to Box Office India, making it the second highest-selling Bollywood soundtrack of 2006, behind only Dhoom 2.

== Release ==
The teaser trailer for Kabhi Alvida Naa Kehna was unveiled alongside the theatrical release of Fanaa on 26 May 2006, as part of the film's promotional campaign. The film premiered globally on 11 August 2006 and was released across more than 1,200 screens worldwide, marking one of the widest international releases for a Hindi-language film at the time.

In the United States, the Motion Picture Association of America (MPAA) initially assigned the film an R rating for strong language and sexual content. Following an appeal by the distributors, the film was reclassified with a PG-13 rating.

== Reception ==
=== Critical reception ===
Kabhi Alvida Naa Kehna received mixed-to-positive reviews in India and internationally. Critics praised its ensemble performances, emotional complexity, and bold narrative treatment of extramarital relationships, though many noted its excessive runtime and melodramatic tone as key drawbacks. On Rotten Tomatoes, the film holds an approval rating of 58% based on 12 reviews, with the consensus stating: “Though ambitious in its attempt to explore infidelity and emotional isolation, Kabhi Alvida Naa Kehna is weighed down by its excessive runtime and melodramatic execution.” On IMDb, it has a rating of 6.1/10 based on over 23,000 user votes.

In India, Taran Adarsh from Bollywood Hungama called it Karan Johar’s "finest work to date," praising the screenplay's contrast between light and emotionally intense moments, and lauding the chemistry among the cast. Rajeev Masand (IBNLive) awarded the film 4 out of 5 stars, commending Johar's control over narrative structure and his ability to elevate ordinary moments with dialogue and score. Baradwaj Rangan noted the film was “too long, too weepy,” but appreciated its thematic depth and subversion of genre tropes. Nowrunning echoed this sentiment, applauding the film's departure from traditional family-centric storytelling in favor of exploring uncomfortable emotional truths.

However, not all feedback was positive. Kaveree Bamzai (India Today) felt Johar lost his usual balance between emotional weight and levity, while Raja Sen (Rediff.com) criticized the film's script, characters, and length, calling it "a mammoth 22-reel experience" with "cardboard characters and glitzy emptiness."

Internationally, the film received a warmer reception. Neil Genzlinger of The New York Times praised the film's visual excesses and comic timing, noting its larger-than-life appeal. Derek Elley of Variety highlighted the film's emotional volatility and credited the performances of Amitabh Bachchan and Preity Zinta. The Austin Chronicle lauded its restraint and internalized emotional tone, calling it a “slow and elegant descent into emotional tumult rarely explored in mainstream cinema.”

=== Box office ===
Kabhi Alvida Naa Kehna was released on 11 August 2006 across more than 1,200 screens worldwide. The film opened to strong box office results, recording a then-record opening in several Indian cities and grossing approximately ₹27.85 crore (equivalent to US$6.2 million at the time) in its first week in India. Although it remains Karan Johar’s lowest-grossing film in India in terms of net domestic collections (unadjusted for inflation), it ranked as the fourth highest-grossing Hindi film of 2006.

Internationally, the film performed exceptionally well. It grossed $10.56 million overseas, becoming the third-highest overseas grosser for a Bollywood film as of 2013. During its opening weekend, it collected $1.35 million in the United States and $1.4 million (£750,000) in the United Kingdom. Its total box office reached $3.27 million in the U.S. and over £5.07 million in the UK. One factor contributing to its American success was its release across 64 theatres, including non-traditional markets such as Miami, Tampa, and Raleigh.

Upon release, the film surpassed Kabhi Khushi Kabhie Gham... (2001) to become the highest-grossing Indian film worldwide. Its total global gross amounted to ₹113 crore (equivalent to US$37 million at the time), making it the top-grossing Indian film of the decade in overseas markets. When adjusted for inflation, it remains one of the highest-grossing Indian films globally.

== Accolades ==
A recipient of several accolades, Kabhi Alvida Naa Kehna led the 52nd Filmfare Awards with 23 nominations, winning Best Supporting Actor for Abhishek Bachchan. The film also received one IIFA Award, two Global Indian Film Awards, one People's Choice Award India, one Screen Award, one Stardust Award, and five Zee Cine Awards.

It was also among the films considered for India's official submission to the 2007 Academy Award for Best International Feature Film, alongside Rang De Basanti, Krrish, Omkara, and Lage Raho Munna Bhai. Ultimately, Rang De Basanti was selected as the country's entry.

== Legacy ==
Kabhi Alvida Naa Kehna has gained recognition over time for its thematic boldness and unconventional portrayal of romantic relationships in Hindi cinema. The film has been retrospectively described as a cult classic and ahead of its time, particularly for its exploration of marital infidelity and emotional dissatisfaction within urban relationships. It has also been cited by Filmfare as one of the best ensemble cast films in Hindi cinema, and was featured by critic Shubhra Gupta in her book 50 Films That Changed Bollywood, noting its impact on the narrative boundaries of mainstream Hindi cinema.

In a retrospective feature, Filmfare observed that "Kabhi Alvida Naa Kehna was made ahead of its time. The subject and the treatment forced people to sit up and think out of their comfort zone." The Times of India remarked that the film did not glorify extramarital relationships, but instead presented their emotional consequences. Firstpost referred to the film as Karan Johar's "most polarized work" as a filmmaker, while Film Companion described it as a "compelling and thought-provoking drama" that invites emotional reflection.

The film is often cited among the notable works of Johar, Shah Rukh Khan, Rani Mukerji, Abhishek Bachchan, and Preity Zinta. In 2010, Bollywood Hungama included Khan and Mukerji's pairing in its list of the top ten romantic on-screen couples of the decade.

== Home media and streaming ==
Kabhi Alvida Naa Kehna was released on DVD on 26 October 2006 by Yash Raj Films. The two-disc set featured Dolby Digital 5.1 audio, optional subtitles in English, Arabic, Malay, Tamil, and Telugu, and included bonus content such as deleted scenes and behind-the-scenes featurettes. The film was subsequently released on Blu-ray on 18 May 2010. The Blu-ray edition featured a 1080p high-definition transfer, DTS-HD Master Audio 5.1, and was issued as a region-free release with English and Arabic subtitles.

As of 2025, the film is available for streaming on platforms including Netflix and Amazon Prime Video.

== See also ==
- List of highest-grossing Bollywood films
- List of Hindi films of 2006
- List of films set in New York City
