= Omkara (2006 film) =

2006 Indian film by Vishal Bhardwaj

- Theatrical release poster
- Directed by: Vishal Bhardwaj
- Screenplay by: Vishal Bhardwaj; Robin Bhatt; Abhishek Chaubey
- Dialogues by: Vishal Bhardwaj
- Based on: Othello by William Shakespeare
- Produced by: Kumar Mangat Pathak
- Starring: Ajay Devgn; Kareena Kapoor; Saif Ali Khan; Konkona Sen Sharma; Vivek Oberoi; Bipasha Basu; Naseeruddin Shah
- Cinematography: Tassaduq Hussain
- Edited by: Meghna Manchanda Sen
- Music by: Vishal Bhardwaj
- Production companies: Shemaroo Films; Big Screen Entertainments
- Distributed by: Eros International
- Release date: 28 July 2006
- Running time: 155 minutes
- Country: India
- Language: Hindi (Note: Spoken with/in a strong Gujari accent)
- Budget: ₹26 crore
- Box office: ₹42 crore

Omkara is a 2006 Indian Hindi-language crime drama film adapted from William Shakespeare's Othello, co-written and directed by Vishal Bhardwaj. It stars an ensemble cast of Ajay Devgn, Kareena Kapoor, Saif Ali Khan, Konkona Sen Sharma, Vivek Oberoi and Bipasha Basu in lead roles. Bhardwaj also composed music for the film, including the background score, with lyrics by Gulzar. The film is set in Meerut, a city in Uttar Pradesh. It is the second film in Bhardwaj's trilogy of Shakespeare adaptations, which began with Maqbool (2003) and completed with Haider (2014).

Omkara was released on 28 July 2006. It received widespread critical acclaim, with praise for its direction, story, screenplay, dialogue, soundtrack and performances of the ensemble cast; particular praise was given to performances by Devgn, Kapoor, Khan, Oberoi, and Sen Sharma.

At the 54th National Film Awards, Omkara won 3 awards, including Best Supporting Actress (Sen Sharma). At the 52nd Filmfare Awards, the film received 19 nominations, including Best Director (Bhardwaj) and Best Actress (Kapoor), and won a leading 9 awards, including Best Actress (Critics) (Kapoor), Best Supporting Actress (Sen Sharma) and Best Villain (Khan).

Omkara was showcased in the Marché du Film section at the 2006 Cannes Film Festival along with a book on the making of the film. It was also selected to be screened at the Cairo International Film Festival, where Bhardwaj was awarded Best Artistic Contribution in Cinema of a Director, in addition to winning three awards at the Kara Film Festival, and an award at the Asian Festival of First Films.

== Plot ==
Omkara "Omi" Shukla operates as the ruthless enforcer for Tiwari Bhaisaab, a powerful local politician. Supported by his loyal lieutenants, Ishwar "Langda" Tyagi and Keshav "Kesu Firangi" Upadhyay, Omkara runs a formidable political gang. The status quo shatters when Langda gatecrashes a wedding procession, challenging the groom, Rajju, to prevent Omkara from abducting the bride, Dolly Mishra. The wedding collapses in chaos. Enraged, Dolly’s father, advocate Raghunath Mishra, threatens Omkara's life. To defuse the situation, Bhaisaab arranges a meeting where Dolly publicly clarifies that she was not kidnapped, but had willingly eloped with Omkara. Disgusted and terrified by her choice to love a violent criminal, her father leaves the village in deep shame.

Meanwhile, the gang consolidates Bhaisaab's political power. They neutralize an electoral rival, Indore Singh, by weaponizing a leaked sex scandal and eliminating his enforcers, intentionally sparing only one man, Kichlu. Following these brutal successes, Bhaisaab wins a seat in parliament, and Omkara is tapped to succeed him as the candidate for the upcoming state elections. Needing to appoint a new lieutenant to run the gang, Omkara passes over the fiercely loyal but uneducated Langda in favor of Kesu, believing Kesu's upper-class background and college education will better appeal to younger voters.

Deeply humiliated and consumed by jealousy, Langda vows to destroy Omkara and Kesu. He orchestrates a meticulous plot, beginning by exploiting Kesu's low alcohol tolerance to spark a violent public brawl with Rajju, instantly damaging Omkara's trust in Kesu's discipline. Langda then manipulates Kesu into visiting Dolly under the guise of asking her to smooth things over with Omkara. Using these innocent meetings, Langda feeds Omkara subtle hints that Kesu and Dolly are having a secret affair. To provide concrete proof, Langda convinces his wife Indu—who is also Omkara's sister—to steal an expensive heirloom piece of jewelry Omkara had gifted to Dolly. Langda then ensures this jewelry finds its way to Kesu's girlfriend, Billo.

The violence escalates when the gang uses Billo to lure Kichlu out of hiding, resulting in Omkara hunting down and murdering Kichlu in a blind rage. After a subsequent bloodbath on a train, a paranoid Omkara violently beats Langda, demanding to know the absolute truth about Dolly and Kesu. Playing the master manipulator, Langda feigns innocence, insisting nothing is going on to fuel Omkara's psychological torment.

On Omkara and Dolly's wedding day, ominous signs multiply. Driven to the brink of madness, Omkara demands definitive proof from Langda before the vows are sealed. Langda stages a final deception: he positions Omkara to overhear Kesu speaking explicitly about Billo, making it seem as though Kesu is talking about Dolly, and ensures Omkara witnesses Billo dropping the stolen heirloom at Kesu's doorstep.

Completely convinced of the betrayal, a heartbroken Omkara smothers Dolly to death on their wedding night. Simultaneously, Langda attempts to tie up loose ends by shooting Kesu, though Kesu manages to survive the ambush. Hearing the gunfire, a panicked Indu rushes to the bridal chamber, only to find Dolly’s corpse. Spotting the heirloom jewelry, a horrified Indu confesses that she stole it on Langda's instructions. Realizing the devastating truth of his fatal error, Omkara is shattered. As Langda attempts to walk away, an enraged Indu slashes her husband's throat in retribution. A wounded Kesu stumbles into the room, asking a final, haunting question before a guilt-ridden Omkara shoots himself in the chest, falling dead beside his innocent wife.

== Cast ==
- Ajay Devgn as Omkara "Omi" Shukla (character based on Othello) – a hardened goon, equivalent to a capo, a man with principles who sees life in extremes, either as good or evil. He is the illegitimate child of a higher caste Brahmin man and a lower caste woman.
- Kareena Kapoor as Dolly Mishra (character based on Desdemona) – a playful, naïve, young woman, smitten by Omi. She expresses her love for him and lays the basis of their relationship. Throughout the narrative, other characters are shown to doubt her character, including her father. Omi finds her personality ambiguous, resulting in their tragic end.
- Saif Ali Khan as Ishwar "Langda" Tyagi (character based on Iago) – the catalyst in the story. He had been a loyal right-hand man to Omi for years and expected to be the next bahubali. Kesu's promotion deals a crushing blow to his ambitions and brings out the evil in him. His jealousy and hatred towards his kin are further encouraged by chiding remarks from Rajju.
- Konkona Sen Sharma as Indu Tyagi (character based on Emilia) – Langda Tyagi's wife. She becomes an unwitting aid in her husband's plan.
- Vivek Oberoi as Keshav "Kesu" Firangi (character based on Cassio) – Omi's other deputy. His epithet comes from his knowledge of English. He is college-educated and urban, known to be somewhat of a casanova. He is important to Omi for his political contacts in the students. After admitting to having "known" a string of women, he falls in love with Billo and proposes marriage. He is shown to be impatient and easily frustrated, with a low threshold for alcohol.
- Bipasha Basu as Billo Chamanbahar (character based on Bianca) – a singer and dancer who melts hearts with just her looks. She sees Kesu as a future companion, but keeps him hanging on. She becomes a pawn for Langda to manipulate.
- Naseerudin Shah as Tiwari Bhaisaab (character based on the Duke of Venice) – an influential and powerful politician that many characters defer to. He is an outwardly sophisticated man, with a ruthless interior. He governs with an iron fist, picking up enemies as he progresses in his career. He is a father figure for Omkara as well as the political head honcho.
- Deepak Dobriyal as Rajan "Rajju" Tiwari (character based on Roderigo) – the son of a respectable thekedar, he is head-over-heels in love with Dolly. He tries to win her affection throughout the film.
- Pankaj Tripathi as Kichlu
- Kamal Tiwari as Advocate Raghunath Mishra (character based on Brabantio)
- Manav Kaushik as Surendra Kaptaan
- Kuldeep Kumar as Golu, Langda's son

== Production ==
=== Casting ===
Aamir Khan was considered for the role of Langda Tyagi, however, Saif Ali Khan was cast instead. Irrfan Khan was offered the role of Kesu, but declined due to date issues. Om Puri and Anupam Kher were both considered for the role of Bhaisaab before Naseeruddin Shah was selected. Sushmita Sen and Esha Deol were both offered the role of Dolly Mishra.

== Release ==
The film received an A Certificate from the censor board of India.

== Reception ==
The film grossed $16,466,144 worldwide in its total run at the box office. Even though the film received rave reviews, its dark theme and strong language kept away family audiences.

Derek Elley of Variety wrote, "Strongly cast, and with a powerhouse perf by Saif Ali Khan in the Iago role, pic puts Bhardwaj in the top ranks of serious Mumbai-based helmers." Peter Bradshaw of The Guardian gave the film three out of five, calling it a "flawed but worthwhile attempt to transfer Othello to the modern setting of Uttar Pradesh in India."

In a more mixed review, Taran Adarsh of IndiaFM gave the film 2.5 out of 5, praising the performances but criticising the "slow pacing" and "the lingo spoken by the characters."

== Soundtrack ==
Omkara

Soundtrack album by Vishal Bhardwaj
- Released: 8 July 2006
- Genre: Feature film soundtrack
- Length: 36:16
- Labels: Eros Music and Sony Music India
- Producers: Hitesh Sonik, Clinton Cerejo

Vishal Bhardwaj chronology
| The Blue Umbrella (2005) | Omkara (2006) | Nishabd (2007) |

The music is composed by Vishal Bhardwaj with the lyrics written by Gulzar. The music was released on 8 July 2006. The official soundtrack contains 8 tracks. The track "Beedi" was used as the Baganiya Song called "Hariya" which was sung by Zubeen Garg and Anamika Tanti in the album Jhumka in 2007. In January 2009, it was also used as the theme tune to a Brazilian TV soap opera called Caminho das Índias, produced by Rede Globo. On the back of this success, "Beedi" received considerable airplay on pop radio stations in Brazil becoming the first Hindi-only song to achieve this. The mini-series' soundtrack, which includes the track, went on to become one of the biggest selling albums of the year. Eventually, Bipasha Basu became the talking point of the film for giving two chartbuster songs, "Beedi" and "Namak", both of which became immensely popular. According to the Indian trade website Box Office India, with around 1,150,000 units sold, this film's soundtrack album was the year's eleventh highest-selling.

=== Track listing ===
| No. | 'Title | Singer(s) | Length | Raga |
|---|---|---|---|---|
| 1 | "Omkara" | Sukhwinder Singh | 5:22 | |
| 4 | "O Saathi Re" | Shreya Ghoshal, Vishal Bhardwaj | 5:30 | Jogkauns |
| 3 | "Beedi" | Sunidhi Chauhan, Sukhwinder Singh, Nachiketa Chakraborty, Clinton Cerejo, Vishal Dadlani | 5:05 | |
| 2 | "Jaag Ja" | Suresh Wadkar | 4:29 | |
| 5 | "Namak" | Rekha Bhardwaj, Rakesh Pandit | 6:52 | |
| 6 | "Naina" | Rahat Fateh Ali Khan | 6:49 | Ahir Bhairav |
| 7 | "Laakad" | Rekha Bhardwaj | 5:36 | |
| 8 | "The Tragedy of Omkara" | Instrumental | 1:35 | |

== See also ==
- Kaliyattam (1997)
- India – A Love Story – A TV series from Brazil with the "Beedi" theme song taken from Omkara.
