= Rakeysh Omprakash Mehra =

Indian film director

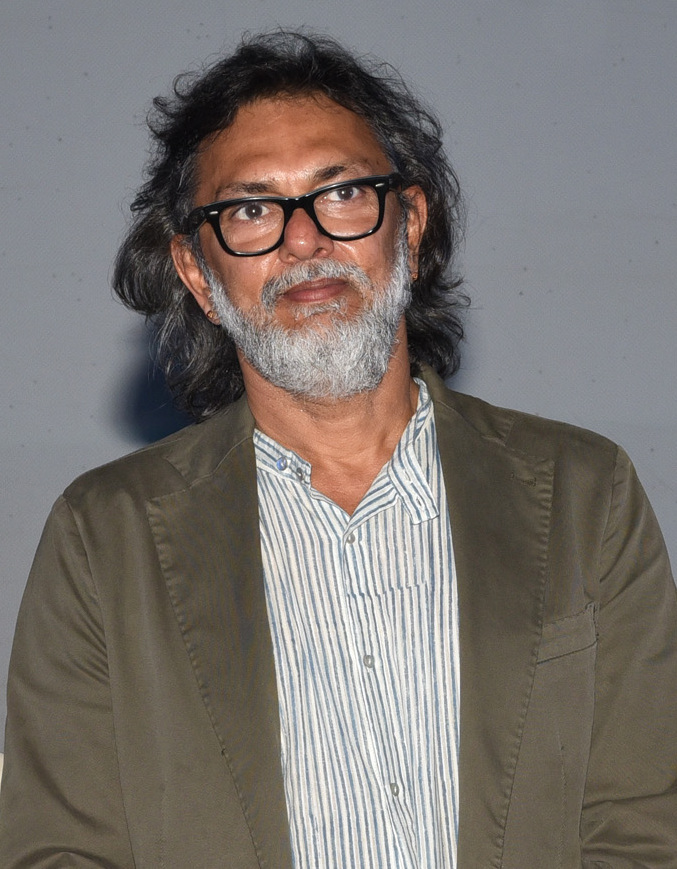
- Mehra c. 2018
- Born: 7 July 1963 (age 63); Delhi, India
- Education: Shri Ram College of Commerce; Delhi University
- Occupations: Film director, producer, screenwriter
- Years active: 1986–present

Rakeysh Omprakash Mehra (born 7 July 1963) is an Indian film director, occasional actor and screenwriter. He is best known for writing and directing the drama Rang De Basanti (2006) and the biographical sports film Bhaag Milkha Bhaag (2013), winning two Filmfare Awards for Best Director. He also wrote and directed the supernatural action thriller Aks (2001) and the drama Delhi-6 (2009).

== Early life ==
He was born on 7 July 1963 in Delhi. His father worked for The Claridges, Delhi. He was a part of the selection camp as a swimmer in the 1982 Asian Games held at New Delhi but was not selected in the final round. He studied at Air Force Bal Bharati School in Delhi.

== Personal life and thoughts ==
In 1992, Mehra married film editor, P. S. Bharathi. The couple have a daughter, Bhairavi, and a son named Vedant.

Mehra criticised the vote-bank politics behind the introduction of the Mandal Commission by VP Singh, and said it inspired him to pen the script of Rang De Basanti.

Mehra has criticised India's education system as being too marks-driven, without any emphasis on actual achievement. Ridiculing the system, he said: "We'd started work on "96.7", till I realised it had become redundant, and I should work on a subject called 100%. It was about the education system. Perhaps I'll make it once I understand the whole system... perhaps my views are very lopsided right now. But the seeds have been sown,". He further added: "Imagine if Shakespeare goes to DU (Delhi University) and he's told, 'We can't take you based on stories you've written as your marksheet isn't that cool.' Or if a Leonardo, or Rabindranath Tagore goes there, and writes something called "Gitanjali" and they tell him, 'Mr Tagore, it's nice to write things such as 'Where the head is held high', but where is your marksheet?"

== Career ==
=== Ad films ===
Mehra started off by selling vacuum cleaners for Eureka Forbes. In 1986, he established Flicks Motion Picture Company Private Limited, starting his career as an advertisement film maker. He directed scores of television commercials for Indian and international clients, including Coke, Pepsi, Toyota, American Express and BPL. He has also directed music videos such as Aby Baby starring Amitabh Bachchan.

=== Film ===
==== Directorial debut and breakthrough (2001–2006) ====
Mehra then gradually shifted from being an ad filmmaker to a feature filmmaker. In 2001, he made his directorial debut with the supernatural action thriller Aks starring Amitabh Bachchan, Raveena Tandon and Manoj Bajpayee in lead roles. Produced by Mehra's own company, the film received mixed reviews upon release, and emerged as a commercial failure at the box-office.

His next venture was the drama Rang De Basanti (2006) starring an ensemble cast of Aamir Khan, Siddharth, R. Madhavan, Sharman Joshi, Atul Kulkarni, Soha Ali Khan, Kunal Kapoor and British actress Alice Patten. The film followed the story of a British film student traveling to India to document the story of five freedom fighters of the Indian revolutionary movement. She befriends and casts five young men in the film, which inspires them to fight against the corruption of their own government. It received positive reviews from critics upon release, with praise for its credibility, direction, screenplay, soundtrack and the performances of the ensemble cast. The film emerged as a commercial success at the box-office, grossing ₹97 crore (US$10 million) worldwide, ranking as the seventh highest-grossing Hindi film of the year. Rang De Basanti won Mehra his first Filmfare Award for Best Film and Best Director, in addition to the National Film Award for Best Popular Film Providing Wholesome Entertainment. The film also earned him a nomination for the BAFTA Award for Best Film Not in the English Language. It was also officially chosen as India's official entry for the Academy Award for Best International Feature Film, but failed to receive a nomination.

==== Career fluctuations (2009–present) ====
Mehra's third venture was the drama Delhi-6 (2009) starring an ensemble cast of Abhishek Bachchan, Sonam Kapoor, Aditi Rao Hydari, Rishi Kapoor, Supriya Pathak, Atul Kulkarni, Divya Dutta, Om Puri and Waheeda Rehman in lead roles. The film tells the story of an NRI who arrives in India with his ailing grandmother and begins discovering his roots before getting embroiled in a religious dispute involving a mysterious monkey-like attacker. Despite pre-release hype, it received mixed reviews from critics upon release, with praise for its soundtrack and performances of the cast, but criticism for its story, screenplay and pacing. The film emerged as a commercial failure at the box-office; however, it won Mehra the Nargis Dutt Award for Best Feature Film on National Integration.

Mehra then produced Mrighdeep Lamba's debut directorial venture, the comedy Teen Thay Bhai (2011). The film, which told the story of three brothers who keep fighting amongst themselves, emerged as a critical and commercial disaster at the box-office.

Mehra's next directorial venture was the biographical sports drama Bhaag Milkha Bhaag (2013) starring Farhan Akhtar as Milkha Singh, the legendary Indian sprinter. Produced by a consortium of several producers, the film opened to positive reviews from critics upon release, and emerged as a major commercial success at the box-office, grossing ₹201 crore (US$21 million), ranking as the eighth highest-grossing Hindi film of the year, and Mehra's highest grosser to date. Bhaag Milkha Bhaag won Mehra his second Filmfare Award for Best Film and Best Director, in addition to his second National Film Award for Best Popular Film Providing Wholesome Entertainment.

Mehra's latest film is Mirzya (2016), a contemporary retelling of the tragic love story of Mirza & Sahiba. Set in Rajasthan, the film marked the debut of two newcomers, namely Harshvardhan Kapoor (son of actor Anil Kapoor) as Mirzya, and Saiyami Kher, granddaughter of veteran actress Usha Kiran, as Sahiba. Gulzar emerged from a long hiatus to write the screenplay of the film, and Shankar–Ehsaan–Loy were entrusted with the music direction. Released on 7 October 2016, Mirzya proved to be an unmitigated disaster at the box office. Made on a budget of Rs. 35 crore (350 million), its total collections over a two-week period amounted to less than Rs. 10 crore (100 million). The film, which had been in the planning since at least 2009, and was made over a three-year period, ran for only one week in most theatres, losing nearly all its screens at the end of that period.

Mere Pyare Prime Minister (2019) was written by himself and Manoj Mairta. Though it received generally positive reviews, it flopped at the box-office.

In 2025, Mehra served as chairperson of the international jury at the 56th International Film Festival of India held from 20 November to 28 November.

== Filmography ==
Year	Film	Director	Producer	Writer
2001	Aks	Yes		Yes
2006	Rang De Basanti	Yes	Yes	Yes
2009	Delhi-6	Yes	Yes	Yes
2011	Teen They Bhai		Yes	
2013	Bhaag Milkha Bhaag	Yes	Yes	
2016	Mirzya	Yes	Yes	
2018	Fanney Khan		Yes	
2019	Mere Pyare Prime Minister	Yes	Yes	Yes
2021	Toofaan	Yes	Yes	

=== Special appearances ===
Year	Film	Role
2013	Bhaag Milkha Bhaag	Pilot
2017	Dear Maya	Ved
2021	Toofaan	IBF secretary Anup Verma

=== Music videos ===
Year	Title	Performer	Ref.
2013	"Betiyaan" (Save the Girl Child)	Shankar Mahadevan, Sunidhi Chauhan, Sonu Nigam	
