= List of Hindi films of 2006 =

This is a list of films produced by the Bollywood film industry based in Mumbai in 2006.

== Box office collection ==
Highest-grossing Hindi films of 2006
Rank	Title	Production	Worldwide gross
1	Dhoom 2	Yash Raj Films	₹151 crore (US$33.33 million)
2	Krrish	Filmkraft Productions	₹126.5 crore (US$27.92 million)
3	Lage Raho Munna Bhai	Eros International; Vinod Chopra Films	₹126.2 crore (US$27.85 million)
4	Kabhi Alvida Naa Kehna	Dharma Productions; Yash Raj Films	₹113 crore (US$24.94 million)
5	Don: The Chase Begins Again	UTV Motion Pictures; Eros International; Excel Entertainment	₹106 crore (US$23.4 million)
6	Fanaa	Yash Raj Films	₹103 crore (US$22.73 million)
7	Rang De Basanti	UTV Motion Pictures; Rakeysh Omprakash Mehra Pictures	₹97 crore (US$21.41 million)
8	Phir Hera Pheri	Base Industries Group	₹69 crore (US$15.23 million)
9	Bhagam Bhag	UTV Motion Pictures; Indian Films; Shree Ashtavinayak Cine Vision; Popcorn Entertainment	₹67 crore (US$14.79 million)
10	Vivah	Rajshri Productions	₹49 crore (US$10.82 million)

== Released films ==
=== January–March ===
Opening		Title	Director	Cast	Genre	Studio	Sources
J A N	5	Kudiyon Ka Hai Zamana	Amar Butala	Rekha, Mahima Chaudhry, Vasundhara Das, Kim Sharma, Ashmit Patel	Comedy		
J A N	6	Devaki	Bappaditya Bandopadhyay	Ram Kapur, Perizaad Zorabian, Suman Ranganathan	Drama		
J A N	6	Jawani Diwani: A Youthful Joyride	Manish Sharma	Emraan Hashmi, Hrishita Bhatt, Celina Jaitley, Sherlyn Chopra	Comedy, adult		
J A N	13	Zinda	Sanjay Gupta	Sanjay Dutt, John Abraham, Lara Dutta, Celina Jaitley, Mahesh Manjrekar, Rajendranath Zutshi, Alisha Baig, Gaurav Chanana	Thriller	White Feather Films	
J A N	26	Rang De Basanti	Rakeysh Omprakash Mehra	Aamir Khan, Kunal Kapoor, Soha Ali Khan, Sharman Joshi, Atul Kulkarni, Madhavan, Alice Patten, Cyrus Sahukar, Waheeda Rehman, Kirron Kher, Om Puri, Anupam Kher, Mohan Agashe	Drama, patriotic, social	UTV Motion Pictures, Rakeysh Omprakash Mehra Pictures	
F E B	3	Aksar	Anant Mahadevan	Emraan Hashmi, Dino Morea, Udita Goswami, Tara Sharma, Rajat Bedi	Thriller	Venus Records & Tapes, Siddhi Vinayak Creations	
F E B	3	Mere Jeevan Saathi	Suneel Darshan	Akshay Kumar, Karisma Kapoor, Amisha Patel	Drama, romance		
F E B	6	Aisa Kyon Hota Hai?	Ajay Kanchan	Aryan Vaid, Rati Agnihotri, Johnny Lever	Drama		
F E B	10	Holiday	Pooja Bhatt	Dino Morea, Onjolee Nair, Kashmera Shah	Romance		
F E B	17	Chingaari	Kalpana Lajmi	Sushmita Sen, Mithun Chakraborty, Anuj Sawhney, Sanjay Suri	Drama, social		
F E B	17	Fight Club: Members Only	Vikram Chopra	Sunil Shetty, Riteish Deshmukh, Zayed Khan, Sohail Khan, Aashish Chaudhary, Yash Tonk, Ashmit Patel, Rahul Dev, Dino Morea, Diya Mirza, Neha Dhupia, Amrita Arora, Murali Sharma	Action, thriller	Rising Star Entertainers	
F E B	17	Rafta Rafta – The Speed	Raj Sharma	Sameer Dharmadhikari, Viraaj Kumar, Urmila Rao, Monica Castelino	Drama, romance		
F E B	24	Humko Tumse Pyaar Hai	Vikram Bhatt	Bobby Deol, Arjun Rampal, Amisha Patel	Drama, romance	Cineyug	
F E B	24	Taxi No. 9211	Milan Luthria	John Abraham, Nana Patekar, Sameera Reddy, Sonali Kulkarni	Social, thriller	UTV Motion Pictures, Entertainment One, Ramesh Sippy Entertainment	
M A R	3	Teesri Aankh: The Hidden Camera	Harry Baweja	Sunny Deol, Amisha Patel, Murli Sharma, Neha Dhupia, Mukesh Rishi	Action, thriller		
M A R	10	Jigyaasa	Faisal Saif	Hrishita Bhatt, Varsha Usgaonkar, Mukesh Tiwari, Milind Gunaji, Jaya Bhattacharya, Kader Khan	Social, adult		
M A R	10	Malamaal Weekly	Priyadarshan	Paresh Rawal, Om Puri, Ritesh Deshmukh, Reema Sen, Arbaaz Khan, Shakti Kapoor, Asrani	Comedy	Sahara One Motion Pictures, Percept Picture Company	
M A R	17	Umar	Karan Razdan	Jimmy Sheirgill, Shenaz Treasurywala, Kader Khan	Drama		
M A R	24	Being Cyrus	Homi Adajania	Saif Ali Khan, Dimple Kapadia, Boman Irani, Naseeruddin Shah, Simone Singh	Drama, comedy	Times Infotainment Media, Miracle Cinefilms, Serendipity Films	
M A R	24	Souten: The Other Woman	Karan Razdan	Gulshan Grover, Mahima Chaudhry	Drama		
M A R	31	Chand Ke Paar Chalo	Mustafa Engineer	Preeti Jhangiani, Sanjay Narvekar	Drama		

=== April–June ===
Opening		Title	Director	Cast	Genre	Studio	Sources
A P R	7	Banaras	Pankaj Parashar	Urmila Matondkar, Dimple Kapadia, Ashmit Patel, Naseeruddin Shah, Raj Babbar	Drama, Social		
A P R	7	Saawan... The Love Season	Saawan Kumar Tak	Salman Khan, Saloni Aswani, Kapil Jhaveri, Johnny Lever	Drama, romance		
A P R	7	Shaadi Se Pehle	Satish Kaushik	Akshaye Khanna, Ayesha Takia, Mallika Sherawat, Sunil Shetty, Aftab Shivdasani, Anupam Kher	Comedy, romance	Mukta Arts	
A P R	14	Eight: The Power of Shani	Karan Razdan	Raj Tara, Gulshan Grover	Thriller	United Dreams Entertainment	
A P R	14	Humko Deewana Kar Gaye	Raj Kanwar	Akshay Kumar, Anil Kapoor, Katrina Kaif, Bipasha Basu, Bhagyashree, Vivek Shauq	Romance, drama, musical	UTV Motion Pictures, T-Series Films, Inderjit Films Combine	
A P R	21	Pyare Mohan	Indra Kumar	Vivek Oberoi, Fardeen Khan, Esha Deol, Amrita Rao, Boman Irani	Comedy	Maruti International	
A P R	28	Darna Zaroori Hai	Ram Gopal Varma	Amitabh Bachchan, Anil Kapoor, Sunil Shetty, Bipasha Basu, Arjun Rampal, Riteish Deshmukh, Mallika Sherawat, Randeep Hooda, Rajpal Yadav, Sonali Kulkarni, Nisha Kothari	Horror		
A P R	28	Gangster: A Love Story	Anurag Basu	Emraan Hashmi, Kangana Ranaut, Shiney Ahuja, Gulshan Grover	Drama, romance, thriller, musical	Vishesh Films	
M A Y	5	36 China Town	Abbas–Mustan	Shahid Kapoor, Kareena Kapoor, Priyanka Chopra, Tanushree Dutta, Akshaye Khanna, Isha Koppikar, Upen Patel, Johny Lever, Paresh Rawal, Payal Rohatgi	Thriller, mystery, comedy, srama	Tips Industries, Mukta Arts	
M A Y	12	Tathastu	Anubhav Sinha	Sanjay Dutt, Amisha Patel, Anup Soni, Gulshan Grover, Darshan Jariwala	Drama, family	Sahara One Motion Pictures	
M A Y	12	Tom, Dick, and Harry	Deepak Tijori	Jimmy Sheirgill, Dino Morea, Anuj Sawhney Celina Jaitley, Kim Sharma	Comedy	Shree Ashtavinayak Cine Vision, Oracle Entertainment	
M A Y	19	Aatma	Deepak Ramsay	Kapil Jhaveri, Neha	Horror		
M A Y	19	Ankahee	Vikram Bhatt	Aftab Shivdasani, Amisha Patel, Vikas Bhalla, Esha Deol, Hrishita Bhatt, Ashwini Kalsekar	Drama, romance, crime		
M A Y	26	Jaadu Sa Chal Gaya	Dev Basu	Raqesh Bapat, Sudhanshu Pandey, Meera Vasudevan	Drama, Romance, Social	Jay Pictures	
M A Y	26	Fanaa	Kunal Kohli	Aamir Khan, Kajol, Tabu, Rishi Kapoor, Shiney Ahuja, Kirron Kher, Lara Dutta, Sharat Saxena	Drama, romance, thriller, musical	Yash Raj Films	
J U N	2	Love Ke Chakkar Mein	B. H. Tharunkumar	Akshat Bhatia, Rishi Kapoor, Namitha, Satish Shah	Romance, comedy		
J U N	2	Sacred Evil – A True Story	Abhigyan Jha	Sarika	Horror, thriller	Sahara One Motion Pictures, Undercover Productions	
J U N	9	Chup Chup Ke	Priyadarshan	Shahid Kapoor, Kareena Kapoor, Neha Dhupia, Sunil Shetty, Paresh Rawal, Rajpal Yadav, Shakti Kapoor, Om Puri, Anupam Kher	Comedy, romance	UTV Motion Pictures	
J U N	9	Phir Hera Pheri	Neeraj Vora	Akshay Kumar, Sunil Shetty, Paresh Rawal, Bipasha Basu, Rimi Sen, Kashmera Shah, Johny Lever, Gulshan Grover	Comedy	Base Industries Group	
J U N	16	Alag	Ashu Trikha	Yatin Karyekar, Dia Mirza, Shah Rukh Khan, Mukesh Tiwari, Arjun Rampal, Akshay Kapoor, Karan Johar, Sushmita Sen	Drama		
J U N	23	Krrish	Rakesh Roshan	Rekha, Hrithik Roshan, Priyanka Chopra, Naseeruddin Shah	Superhero, action, fantasy, romance, musical, adventure	FilmKraft Productions	

=== July–September ===
Opening		Title	Director	Cast	Genre	Studio	Sources
J U L	7	Corporate	Madhur Bhandarkar	Bipasha Basu, Kay Kay Menon, Minissha Lamba, Payal Rohatgi	Drama, thriller, business	Sahara One Motion Pictures, Percept Picture Company	
J U L	14	Golmaal: Fun Unlimited	Rohit Shetty	Ajay Devgn, Arshad Warsi, Sharman Joshi, Tusshar Kapoor, Paresh Rawal, Rimi Sen, Sushmita Mukherjee	Comedy	Eros International, Shree Ashtavinayak Cine Vision, K Sera Sera	
J U L	21	The Killer	Hasnain Hyderabadwala	Irrfan Khan, Emraan Hashmi, Nisha Kothari	Action, thriller	Vishesh Films	
J U L	21	The Real Dream Girls	Suresh Jain	Gulshan Rana, Tanveer Hashmi, Karishma, Dipti Verma	B-grade		
J U L	21	Yun Hota Toh Kya Hota	Nasseruddin Shah	Ayesha Takia, Konkona Sen Sharma, Paresh Rawal	Drama		
J U L	28	Omkara	Vishal Bhardwaj	Ajay Devgn, Kareena Kapoor, Saif Ali Khan, Konkona Sen Sharma, Vivek Oberoi, Bipasha Basu	Drama, social, action	Shemaroo Films, Big Screen Entertainer, Eros International	
A U G	4	Anthony Kaun Hai?	Raj Kaushal	Sanjay Dutt, Arshad Warsi, Minissha Lamba, Anusha Dhandekar, Gulshan Grover	Comedy, thriller		
A U G	4	Darwaaza Bandh Rakho	J. D. Chakravarthy	Aftab Shivdasani, Manisha Koirala, Gulshan Grover, Snehal Dabi, Chunky Pandey	Comedy, crime	RGV Film Company	
A U G	4	Shaadi Karke Phas Gaya Yaar	K. S. Adiyaman	Salman Khan, Shilpa Shetty, Mohnish Bahl, Shakti Kapoor, Supriya Karnik, Reema Lagoo	Drama, romance	Eros International, Karishma International	
A U G	11	Kabhi Alvida Naa Kehna	Karan Johar	Amitabh Bachchan, Shah Rukh Khan, Abhishek Bachchan, Rani Mukerji, Preity Zinta, Kirron Kher	Drama, romance, musical, comedy, family, social	Yash Raj Films, Dharma Productions	
A U G	18	Ahista Ahista	Shivam Nair	Abhay Deol, Soha Ali Khan, Shayan Munshi, Brijendra Kala, Richa Chadda, Shakeel Khan	Drama, romance		
A U G	25	Aap Ki Khatir	Dharmesh Darshan	Sunil Shetty, Akshaye Khanna, Dino Morea, Anupam Kher, Sharat Saxena, Lillete Dubey, Amisha Patel, Priyanka Chopra	Comedy, romance, social	Venus Records & Tapes	
A U G	25	Sandwich	Anees Bazmee	Govinda, Raveena Tandon, Mahima Chaudhry	Comedy	Sahara One Motion Pictures, InNetwork Entertainment, Rahul Productions	
S E P	1	Jaane Hoga Kya	Glen Barretto, Ankush Mohla	Aftab Shivdasani, Bipasha Basu, Preeti Jhangiani, Paresh Rawal, Rahul Dev	Supensene, thriller, sci-fi		
S E P	1	Lage Raho Munna Bhai	Rajkumar Hirani	Sanjay Dutt, Arshad Warsi, Vidya Balan, Boman Irani, Dia Mirza, Jimmy Shergill	Comedy, social, musical	Eros International, Vinod Chopra Films	
S E P	8	Dil Diya Hai	Aaditya Datt	Emraan Hashmi, Kitu Gidwani, Ranjeet, Ashmit Patel, Geeta Basra, Mithun Chakraborty	Thriller	Shree Ashtavinayak Cine Vision, Shiv Films Production, Practical Productions	
S E P	8	Naksha	Sachin Bajaj	Sunny Deol, Vivek Oberoi, Sameera Reddy, Jackie Shroff	Thriller, fantasy		
S E P	15	Bas Ek Pal	Onir	Juhi Chawla, Urmila Matondkar, Jimmy Sheirgill, Sanjay Suri	Crime, drama	Sahara One Motion Pictures, Parmahans Creations	
S E P	15	Pyaar Ke Side Effects	Saket Chaudhary	Rahul Bose, Mallika Sherawat, Jas Arora, Ranvir Shorey, Aamir Bashir	Comedy, romance	Eros International, Pritish Nandy Communications	
S E P	15	Shiva	Ram Gopal Varma	Mohit Ahlawat, Nisha Kothari	Action	Adlabs, RGV Film Company	
S E P	22	Dor	Nagesh Kukunoor	Ayesha Takia, Gul Panag, Shreyas Talpade, Vishal Malhotra	Drama, social	Sahara One Motion Pictures	
S E P	22	Khosla Ka Ghosla	Dibakar Banerjee	Anupam Kher, Boman Irani, Parvin Dabas, Nitesh Pandey, Kiran Juneja, Tara Sharma, Ranvir Shorey, Danish Aslam, Vinay Pathak	Comedy	UTV Motion Pictures, Tandav Film Entertainment	
S E P	22	Rocky	Suresh Krishna	Zayed Khan, Minissha Lamba, Rajat Bedi, Isha Sharvani	Action, romance		
S E P	29	Krishna	Amar Khan	Sonu Nigam, Sunidhi Chauhan	Computer animated		
S E P	29	Woh Lamhe...	Mohit Suri	Kangana Ranaut, Shiney Ahuja, Purab Kohli	Drama, romance, social	Vishesh Films	

=== October–December ===
Opening		Title	Director	Cast	Genre	Studio	Sources
O C T	6	Bhoot Unkle	Mukesh Saigal	Jackie Shroff, Sheena Bajaj	Comedy		
O C T	6	Jaana - Let's Fall In Love	Glen Barretto, Ankush Mohla	Rajesh Khanna, Zeenat Aman, Rehan Khan, Anjana Sukhani, Rajeev Verma	Romance, comedy, drama	Tess Mirza Films Pvt. Ltd.	
O C T	6	Iqraar by Chance	K. Ravi Shankar	Shilpa Anand, Amarjeet Shukla, Rahul Dev, Arbaaz Khan	Action, drama		
O C T	6	Zindaggi Rocks	Tanuja Chandra	Sushmita Sen, Shiney Ahuja	Drama	B.A.G. Films	
O C T	13	Utthaan	Ujjhal Chatterjee	Priyanshu Chatterjee, Neha Dhupia, Sudesh Berry			
O C T	20	Don: The Chase Begins Again	Farhan Akhtar	Shah Rukh Khan, Priyanka Chopra, Arjun Rampal, Kareena Kapoor, Boman Irani, Om Puri, Isha Koppikar	Thriller, action, drama	UTV Motion Pictures, Excel Entertainment	
O C T	20	Jaan-E-Mann	Shirish Kunder	Salman Khan, Akshay Kumar, Preity Zinta	Drama, romance, musical, comedy	Nadiadwala Grandson Entertainment	
N O V	3	Umrao Jaan	J. P. Dutta	Aishwarya Rai, Abhishek Bachchan, Shabana Azmi, Sunil Shetty, Divya Dutta	Drama, romance, social, historical	Adlabs, J.P. Films	
N O V	10	Apna Sapna Money Money	Sangeeth Sivan	Sunil Shetty, Riteish Deshmukh, Shreyas Talpade, Celina Jaitley, Anupam Kher, Koena Mitra, Jackie Shroff, Riya Sen, Chunky Pandey, Rajpal Yadav	Comedy	Mukta Arts	
N O V	10	Deadline: Sirf 24 Ghante	Tanveer Khan	Irrfan Khan, Konkona Sen Sharma, Rajeev Verma	Thriller		
N O V	10	Vivah	Sooraj R. Barjatya	Shahid Kapoor, Amrita Rao, Mohnish Bahl, Anupam Kher, Samir Soni	Romance, drama	Rajshri Productions	
N O V	17	Unns...Means Love	Bhupender Gupta	Juhi Babbar, Chitrapama Banerjee, Sanjay Kapoor	Drama, musical, romance	Buneesha Films, Das Music	
N O V	23	Sarhad Paar	Raman Kumar	Sanjay Dutt, Tabu, Mahima Chaudhry, Rahul Dev	Drama		
N O V	24	Dhoom 2	Sanjay Gadhvi	Hrithik Roshan, Abhishek Bachchan, Aishwarya Rai, Bipasha Basu, Uday Chopra, Rimi Sen,	Thriller, action, romance, musical	Yash Raj Films	
D E C	8	Baabul	Ravi Chopra	Amitabh Bachchan, Hema Malini, Salman Khan, Rani Mukherji, John Abraham	Drama, romance, family, social	B.R. Films	
D E C	15	Aryan	Abhishek Kapoor	Sohail Khan, Sneha Ullal, Inder Kumar, Fardeen Khan, Ahsaas Channa, Satish Shah, Farida Jalal, Puneet Issar	Action, sports, romance	Telebrands Entertainment	
D E C	15	Kabul Express	Kabir Khan	John Abraham, Linda Arsenio, Arshad Warsi	Drama, thriller, war	Yash Raj Films	
D E C	22	Bhagam Bhag	Priyadarshan	Akshay Kumar, Govinda, Paresh Rawal, Lara Dutta, Tanushree Dutta, Jackie Shroff, Gurleen Chopra, Rajpal Yadav, Sharat Saxena, Arbaaz Khan, Shakti Kapoor, Asrani, Manoj Joshi	Comedy, musical	UTV Motion Pictures, Shree Ashtavinayak Cine Vision, Popcorn Entertainment	
D E C	29	I See You	Vivek Agrawal	Arjun Rampal, Vipasha Agarwal, Sonali Kulkarni, Chunky Pandey, Boman Irani, Kirron Kher, Shahrukh Khan, Hrithik Roshan	Drama		

== See also ==
- List of Hindi films of 2007
- List of Hindi films of 2005
