= Abhigyan Jha =

- Born: 1972 (age 53–54)
- Occupations: Screenwriter, producer, director
- Years active: 1993−present
- Organization(s): Undercover Utopia; ProMytheUs
- Spouse: Mrinal Jha
- Website: abhigyanjha.com

Abhigyan Jha is an Indian film screenwriter, producer, director, writer and entrepreneur who has worked predominantly in Hindi film and television industry. He has written story for film Krishna Cottage (2004), Phir Zindagi and TV show, Tum Bin Jaaoon Kahaan, and made his directorial debut with Sacred Evil – A True Story (2006). He is the creator and director of Jay Hind!, exclusively made for the Internet. He also directed and produced the late-night talk show Movers & Shakers for Sony.

He is the co-founder of Undercover Utopia. He is also a co-founder of ProMytheUs, a machine learning talent discovery platform.

His latest directorial venture is the groundbreaking science fiction series Janani – AI Ki Kahani (2024) on Dangal TV, acclaimed for its unprecedented action sequences and VFX showcasing robots and artificial intelligence. He also produced Qayaamat Se Qayaamat Tak (2024) in collaboration with BBC for Colors TV and both shows garnered awards at ITA 2024

== Career ==
After completing the creative training program from the Advertising Agencies Association of India, Abhigyan started assisting to Anand Mahendroo. He published his first novel, November Rain in 1994, followed by his second novel, The Prayer. His novel, November Rain was transformed into a prime time TV series Tum Bin Jaaoon Kahaan, which was aired on Zee TV for over 300 episodes. In 1997, Jha worked as an assistant producer under Ismail Merchant on the international film GAACHH, starring Soumitra Chatterjee, Sharmila Tagore and Aparna Sen. In 1997, Abhigyan Jha directed and produced the Sony Entertainment's popular late-night talk show, Movers & Shakers.

He wrote the story and screenplay of Ekta Kapoor's production, Krishna Cottage (2004) and has also written the film, Alvida, starring Milind Soman, Gul Panag and Waheeda Rahman. In 2006, he made his debut as a director with Sacred Evil – A True Story. He produced TV series, Kaali – Ek Agnipariksha, which was aired on Star Plus In 2009, Abhigyan Jha launched Jay Hind!, a standup comedy show exclusively for the Internet platform. It was the world's first full format TV show exclusively made for the Internet. He is credited for pioneering the standup comedy genre in India on TV with Varun Grover, Aditi Mittal, Sorabh Pant, Gursimran Khamba and Sapan Verma.

Abhigyan was nominated for ITA Award for Best Director - Comedy at the Indian Television Academy Awards 2011 for Jay Hind!. Later, the show was aired on Colors TV under a new name, The Late Night Show in 2012.

In April 2014, Abhigyan Jha accused Vikas Bahl, the director of Queen for copying the film, Queen from his film, Phir Zindagi. However, Jha accepted the fact that while the scripts of the two films are different, but some major scenes from the film have been copied straight from Phir Zindagi.

Abhigyan and Mrinal Jha co-founded MAJ Productions, creating TV shows (Pishachini, Terr Bina Jiya Jaaye Na) and web series (Qubool Hai 2.0).

For Jai Hind!, He collaborated with writers like Varun Grover, Aditi Mittal, Sorabh Pant, Gursimran Khamba, and Sapan Verma, pioneering the stand-up comedy genre in Indian television. The series earned Jha a nomination for the ITA Award for Best Director – Comedy in 2011.

== Published works ==
- November Rain: Memories of the Spellbound : a Supernatural Love Story Based on True Incidents. Undercover Utopia. 2007. ISBN 9780979811609.
- The Prayer. Undercover Utopia. September 2007. ISBN 9780979811623.
- The Class of 2010. Undercover Utopia. September 2008. ISBN 9780979811661.
- Soul Search Engine : Till Now... Undercover Utopia. February 2008. ISBN 9780979811647.

== Filmography ==
Year	Film	Role	Notes
2004	Krishna Cottage	Story, screenplay writer	
-	Phir Zindagi	Screenplay writer	
-	GAACHH	Assistant producer	
2006	Sacred Evil – A True Story	Director, producer	English
2006	Gehra Paani	Director	Hindi

== Television ==
Year	TV/Web Show	Role	Channel
1999	Star Bestsellers Neeti	Story writer	StarPlus
1998	X Zone	Story writer	StarPlus
1999	Gubbare	Executive Producer	
1997	Movers & Shakers	Director, producer	Sony
1995	Rajani	Story writer	Doordarshan
2003	Tum Bin Jaaoon Kahaan	Story writer	Zee TV
2009	Jay Hind!	Director	for the Internet
2010	Kaali – Ek Agnipariksha	Producer	Star Plus
2012	The Late Night Show	Director	Colors TV
2022	Pishachini	Producer	Colors TV
2021	Qubool Hai 2.0	Producer	Zee 5
2024	Qayaamat Se Qayamaat Tak	Producer	Colors TV
2024	JANANI -AI Ki Kahani	Director & Producer	Dangal TV

== Awards & Nominations ==
Year	Award Category	TV show / Web Show / Film	Result
	Gold Award for Best Story	Maayka	Won
2011	Indian Television Academy Award for Best Director	Jay Hind!	Nomination
2022	Indian Television Academy Award for Best Singer	Pishachini	Won
2022	Indian Television Academy Award for Best Director	Pishachini	Nomination
2022	Indian Television Academy Award for Best VFX	Pishachini	Won
2023	Indian Television Academy Award for Best Visual Effects	Pichachini	Won
2024	Indian Television Academy Award for Best Fantasy Show	Janani-AI Ki Kahani	Won

== Personal life ==
He is married to Mrinal Jha and has a daughter. He is the son of Ramesh Rajhans, a theatre director and playwright.

Abhigyan Jha believes in nurturing young talent and empowering future storytellers. He co-founded Undercover Utopia, fostering creativity among young writers, and ProMytheUs, a machine-learning platform to identify children’s innate talents.
