= Amit Mehra =

International model and actor

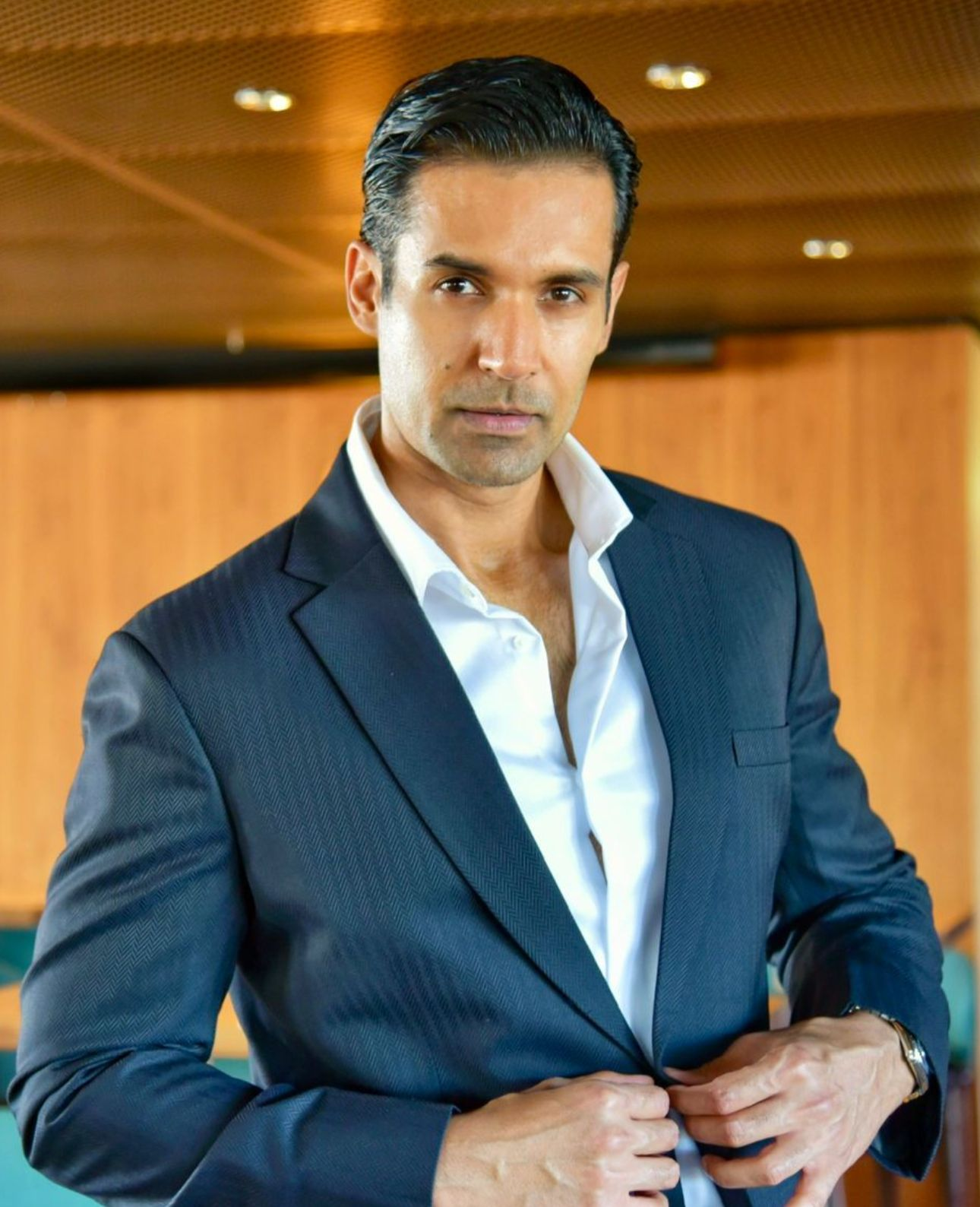
- Amit Mehra in 2026
- Born: 17 September 1992 (age 33); Delhi, India
- Years active: 2009
- Known for: Mr, Universe India, Mahabharata, Mahabali Hanuman, Pishachini, Khatron ke Khiladi,
- Website: https://amit-mehra.com/

Amit Mehra is an Indian actor and model born in Delhi. Mr. Universe India 2018, Mehra has acted in various films and television shows since 2014.

== Career ==
He began his career in 2009. He is known for Mahabharata, Mahabali Hanuman, Pishachini, Khatron Ke Khiladi (as a Celebrity), Mr Universe India. Amit started his modeling career while studying acting in California. He has working with major brand, including Coca-Cola, Amazon, Radisson Hotels, Airtel, Siyarams, HP, Schwarzkopf, and L'Oreal.

== Personal life ==
Mehra was born in Delhi into a Punjabi Hindu family associated with newspapers. From an early age, he excelled at sports, particularly cricket, badminton, volleyball, and athletics. As he grew taller, he embraced going to the gym, fostering a lifelong commitment to fitness. Amit works out everyday and also provides fitness advice to others.

== Mr. Universe India 2018 ==
In 2018, Amit won the title of Mr. Universe India and represented India at the "Mr. Universe World Championships" in the Dominican Republic, finishing runner-up in the sports and fitness category.

== Production work ==
Amit expanded into production, focusing on documentary Film-making. His current projects explores ancient Indian temples, aiming to showcase India's cultural heritage on globle scale.

== Philanthropy ==
Amit is actively involved in charity work supporting orphanages and children's education. He regularly donates to underprivileged children, providing them with resources for a better future.

== Filmography ==
Year	Title	Role	Notes
2014	Mahabharat	Shiva	
2014	Titoo MBA	Honey Singh	
2017	Sankat Mochan Mahabali Hanumaan	Shiva	
2019	Arjun Patiala	Baldev Rana	
2019	Marjaavaan	Gaitonde's son	
2022-2023	Pishachini	Sanchit Rajput	

== External Link ==
- Amit Mehra at IMDb
- Amit Mehra on Instagram
