= Sahara Movie Studios =

Indian film production and distribution firm

- Formerly: Sahara One Motion Pictures; Sahara Motion Pictures
- Type: Division
- Industry: Entertainment
- Founded: August 13, 2004; 22 years ago
- Defunct: November 5, 2014; 12 years ago
- Headquarters: Mumbai, India
- Key people: Sandeep Bhargava(COO); Subrata Roy (CEO)
- Products: Motion Pictures
- Services: Production, Distribution and Marketing of Films
- Parent: Sahara India Pariwar

Sahara Movie Studios or also known as (Sahara One Motion Pictures or Sahara Motion Pictures) was a film production company. They produced some films from 2004 to 2014. This company was owned by Sahara India Pariwar.

== Filmography ==
=== Films produced ===
Year	Film	Director	Notes	Ref
2004
2004	Sheen	Ashoke Pandit	Based on the Insurgency in Jammu and Kashmir, released and produced as Sahara India Mass Communications Ltd.	
2004	Kyun! Ho Gaya Na...	Samir Karnik	Co-produced by Boney Kapoor, debut Hindi film of Kajal Aggarwal.	
2004	Run	Jeeva	Remake of Tamil film Run	
2004	Hanan: An Assault on Faith	Makarand Deshpande		
2004	Gayab	Prawaal Raman	Remade in Tamil as Jithan	
2004	Naach	Ram Gopal Varma	Produced by Chitra Subramaniam	
2004	Inteqam: The Perfect Game	Pankaj Parashar	Produced by Ranjeet Shah	
2004	Phir Milenge	Revathi	Inspired from the Hollywood movie Philadelphia	
2005	Home Delivery	Sujoy Ghosh	Produced by Shabbir Boxwala	
2005	Film Star	Tanuja Chandra		
2005	Bachke Rehna Re Baba	Govind Menon	Produced by Vijay Galani	
2005	No Entry	Anees Bazmee	Remake of Tamil movie Charlie Chaplin	
2005	Pyaar Mein Twist	Hriday Shetty	Based on 2003 Kannada film Preethi Prema Pranaya	
2005	Pehchaan: The Face of Truth	Shrabani Deodhar	Released in Hindi and English	
2005	Yahaan	Shoojit Sircar	Produced by Sahara Movie Studios and Red Ice Films Star Screen Award for Best Lyrics (Won) - "Naam Adaa Likhna" (Gulzar) Star Screen Award for Best Film - Robby Grewal Star Screen Award for Best Director - Shoojit Sircar Star Screen Award for Best Actress - Minnisha Lamba Star Screen Award for Playback Singer Male - "Naam Adaa Likhna" (Shaan) Star Screen Award for Playback Singer Female - "Naam Adaa Likhna" (Shreya Ghoshal) Screen Award for Best Lyricist - "Naam Adaa Likhna" (Gulzar)	
2005	My Wife's Murder	Jiji Philip	Remake of the 2004 Telugu film Madhyanam Hathya	
2005	Jo Bole So Nihaal	Rahul Rawail	Released in Hindi, English, and Punjabi. Debut film of singer Kamaal Khan	
2005	D	Vishram Sawant		
2005	Bewafaa	Dharmesh Darshan		
2005	Tum... Ho Na	NS Raj Bharath		
2005	Hanuman	V. G. Samant	Produced by Percept Picture Company	
2005	99.9 FM - Nothing is 100%	Sanjay Bhatia		
2005	James	Rohit Jugraj		
2005	Hum Jo Keh Na Paaye	Vikas Desai		
2006	Malamaal Weekly	Priyadarshan	Remake of 1998 Hollywood film Waking Ned	
2006	Tathastu	Anubhav Sinha	Based on the 2002 Hollywood movie John Q.	
2006	Sacred Evil - A True Story Gehra Paani In Hindi (English Film)	Abhigyan Jha		
2006	Katputtli	Sanjay Khanna		
2006	Bas Ek Pal	Onir	Based on the 1997 Spanish film Live Flesh	
2006	Darna Zaroori Hai	Satish Kaushik, Ram Gopal Varma, Prawaal Raman, Vivek Shah, Jiji Philip, J. D. Chakravarthy, Manish Gupta	Anthology film	
2006	Banaras: A Mystic Love Story	Pankaj Parashar		
2006	Ladies Tailor	Udhyakanth		
2006	Dor	Nagesh Kukunoor	Based on the 2004 Malayalam movie Perumazhakkalam	
2006	Sandwich: Double Trouble	Anees Bazmee	Remade in Kannada as Double Decker	
2006	Prateeksha	Basu Chatterjee		
2006	The Truck of Dreams	Arun Kumar	Marathi Movie	
2007	Strangers	Aanand L. Rai	Based on the 1951 Alfred Hitchcock's Hollywood movie Strangers on a Train	
2007	Kaisay Kahein...	Mohit Hussein		
2007	Deha	Mahesh Manjrekar		
2008	EMI: Liya Hai Toh Chukana Padega!	Saurabh Kabra		
2008	Mumbai Cutting	Anurag Kashyap, Sudhir Mishra, Rahul Dholakia, Kundan Shah, Revathy, Jahnu Barua, Rituparno Ghosh, Shashanka Ghosh, Ruchi Narain, Ayush Raina, Manish Jha	Anthology film	
2008	My Name Is Anthony Gonsalves	Eeshwar Nivas		
2011	Kaccha Limboo	Sagar Ballary		
2012	Teen Yaari Katha	Sudeshna Roy	Bengali Film	
2014	Bhopal: A Prayer for Rain	Ravi Kumar	Based on the Bhopal Disaster at 1984 in Bhopal, Madhya Pradesh, released in Hindi and English	
2014	Familywala	Neeraj Vora		

=== Films distributed ===
Year	Film	Director	Production Company	Notes	Ref
1989	Jurrat	David Dhawan	Sahara One Motion Pictures	Remake of 1987 Hollywood film The Untouchables Distribution only	
1989	Dav Pech	Kawal Sharma	Sahara One Motion Pictures	Remake of 1983 Telugu film Roshagadu Distribution only	
2004	Netaji Subhas Chandra Bose: The Forgotten Hero	Shyam Benegal	Sahara One Motion Pictures	Based on the life of Indian Independence leader and Indian National Army leader Subhash Chandra Bose	
2004	Dil Maange More	Anant Mahadevan	Sahara One Motion Pictures		
2005	The Chronicles of Narnia: The Lion, the Witch and the Wardrobe	Andrew Adamson	Sahara One Motion Pictures	Indian distribution only	
2005	Mumbai Xpress	Singeetam Srinivasa Rao	Sahara One Motion Pictures	Released in Tamil and Hindi	
2005	Page 3	Madhur Bhandarkar	Sahara One Motion Pictures		
2005	Sarkar	Ram Gopal Varma	Sahara One Motion Pictures	First Installment of the Sarkar.	
2006	Corporate	Madhur Bhandarkar	Sahara One Motion Pictures		
2008	De Taali	Eeshwar Nivas	Sahara One Motion Pictures	Remake of 2001 Hollywood film Saving Silverman	
2008	Mere Baap Pehle Aap	Priyadarshan	Sahara One Motion Pictures	Remake of 2001 Malayalam Film Ishtam	
2008	Bhootnath	Vivek Sharma	Sahara One Motion Pictures		
2008	Sarkar Raj	Ram Gopal Varma	Sahara One Motion Pictures	Second Installment of Sarkar	
2009	8 X 10 Tasveer	Nagesh Kukunoor	Percept Picture Company		
2009	Wanted	Prabhu Deva	BSK Entertainment	Remake of 2006 Telugu film Pokiri	
2010	Milenge Milenge	Satish Kaushik	Sahara One Motion Pictures	Based on 2001 Hollywood film Serendipity	
2011	Love Breakups Zindagi	Sahil Sangha	Sahara Motion Pictures		
2014	Gulaab Gang	Soumik Sen	Sahara Movie Studios	Based on the Vigilante Activists Gulabi Gang from Bundelkhand.	

=== Unreleased/shelved films ===
Year	Film	Director	Production Company	Notes	Ref
2009	Mumbai Chakachak	Sanjay Jha	Sahara One Motion Pictures		
