= Mrinal Jha =

Indian writer, screenwriter and producer

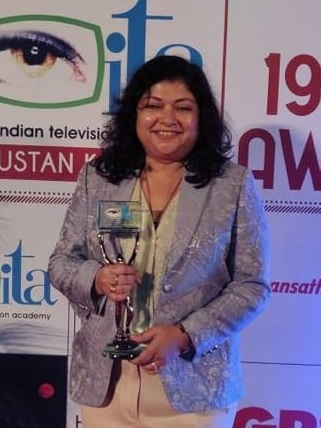
- Mrinal Jha at the 19th ITA Awards (2019)
- Occupations: Writer, Screenwriter, Author
- Years active: 2007–present
- Organization: Undercover Utopia
- Spouse: Abhigyan Jha
- Website: Official website

Mrinal Jha is an Indian writer, screenwriter and producer, who works in Hindi films and Television. She has written for popular TV shows such as Kaahin Kissii Roz, Banoo Main Teri Dulhann, Maayka, Agle Janam Mohe Bitiya Na Kijo, Qubool Hai, Divya Drishti, Naagin, Ishqbaaaz,Yehh Jadu Hai Jinn Ka!.

Mrinal Jha won Gold Award for Best Writer (story) in 2008 for the TV serial, Maayka. She is the winner of 2019 Indian Television Academy (ITA) Awards Best Story for the Sony TV's Tara From Satara. Her recent venture Pishachini. won ITA Award for Best Visual Effects and Best Singer in 2023. In 2024, She worked on Qayaamat se Qayaamat Tak for Colors TV and Janani-AI Ki Kahani for Dangal TV. The latter won the Award for Best Fantasy Show at the ITA Awards 2024.

== Personal life ==
She is married to Abhigyan Jha and has a daughter. She has three dogs.

== Career ==
Mrinal has been a scriptwriter and creative producer for several TV channels some of which include Zee TV, Balaji Telefilms, Doordarshan, Star Plus, UTV. She along with Abhigyan Jha produced, Kaali - Ek Agnipariksha in 2010. She was also the producer of Jay Hind! a standup comedy show for the Internet platform.

Mrinal has written scripts for TV serials like Kaahin Kissii Roz, Kya Haadsa Kya Haqeeqat, Tum Bin Jaaoon Kahaan, Banoo Main Teri Dulhan, Amber Dhara, Chhoona Hai Aasmaan, Kyunki Saas Bhi Kabhi Bahu Thi, Santaan, Kasturi, Kaali- Ek Agnipariksha, Sanjog Se Bani Sangini, Nazar and Pyaar Ka Bandhan. She has also penned for Mano Ya Na Mano, Meher, Yehh Jadu Hai Jinn Ka!, Tara From Satara.

She is also the co-founder of Undercover Utopia. Mrinal also won the Best Writer - Story award in 2008 at the Gold Awards function held in Dubai, for the TV series, Maayka.

== Published works ==
She debuted as a novelist with November Rain in 1994. Her novel, November Rain was transformed into a prime time TV series Tum Bin Jaaoon Kahaan, which was televised on Zee TV for over 300 episodes. Mrinal Jha has written four novels; November Rain, The Prayer, Soul Search Engine and Class MMX.

== Filmography ==
=== Television ===
Year	Title	Channel	Notes
2000	Kyunki Saas Bhi Kabhi Bahu Thi	Star Plus	
2001	Kaahin Kissii Roz	Star Plus	
2002	Kya Haadsa Kya Haqeeqat	Star Plus	
2003	Tum Bin Jaaoon Kahaan	Zee TV	
2004	Meher	DD National	
2006	Banoo Main Teri Dulhan	Zee TV	
2006	Mano Ya Na Mano	Zee TV	
2007	Amber Dhara	Sony Entertainment Television	
2007	Chhoona Hai Aasmaan	Star One	
2007	Santaan	Star Plus	
2007	Kasturi	Star Plus	
2007	Maayka	Zee TV	
2009	Pyaar Ka Bandhan	Sony Entertainment Television	
2009	Agle Janam Mohe Bitiya Na Kijo	Zee TV	
2010	Kaali- Ek Agnipariksha,	Star Plus	
2010	Sanjog Se Bani Sangini	Zee TV	
2012	Qubool Hai	Zee TV	
2015	Naagin	Colors TV	
2016	Ishqbaaaz	Star Plus	
2018	Nazar	Star Plus	
2019	Yehh Jadu Hai Jinn Ka!	Star Plus	
2019	Tara From Satara	Sony Entertainment Television	
2019	Divya Drishti	Star Plus	
2022	Pishachini	Colors TV	
2024	Qayaamat Se Qayamaat Tak	Colors TV	
2024	JANANI -AI Ki Kahani	Dangal TV	

=== Web series ===
Year	Title	Network	Notes
2021	Qubool Hai 2.0	ZEE5	
2021	The Socho Project	-	

== Awards and nominations ==
Year	Award(s)	Show	Result
2008	Gold Awards for Best writer - Story Award	Maayka	Won
2009	Indian Telly Jury Award for Best Story Writer	Agle Janam Mohe Bitiya Na Kijo	Nominated
2009	Indian Telly Jury Award for Best Screenplay Writer	Agle Janam Mohe Bitiya Na Kijo	Nominated
2019	Indian Television Academy Award for Best Story	Tara From Satara	Won
2021	Indian Television Academy Award for Best Visual Effects	Yehh Jadu Hai Jin Ka	Won
2022	Indian Television Academy Award for Best Singer	Pishachini	Won
2023	Indian Television Academy Award for Best Visual Effects	Pichachini	Won
2024	Indian Television Academy Award for Best Fantasy Show	Janani-AI Ki Kahani	Won
