= Zhang Huaicun =

Chinese author (born 1972)

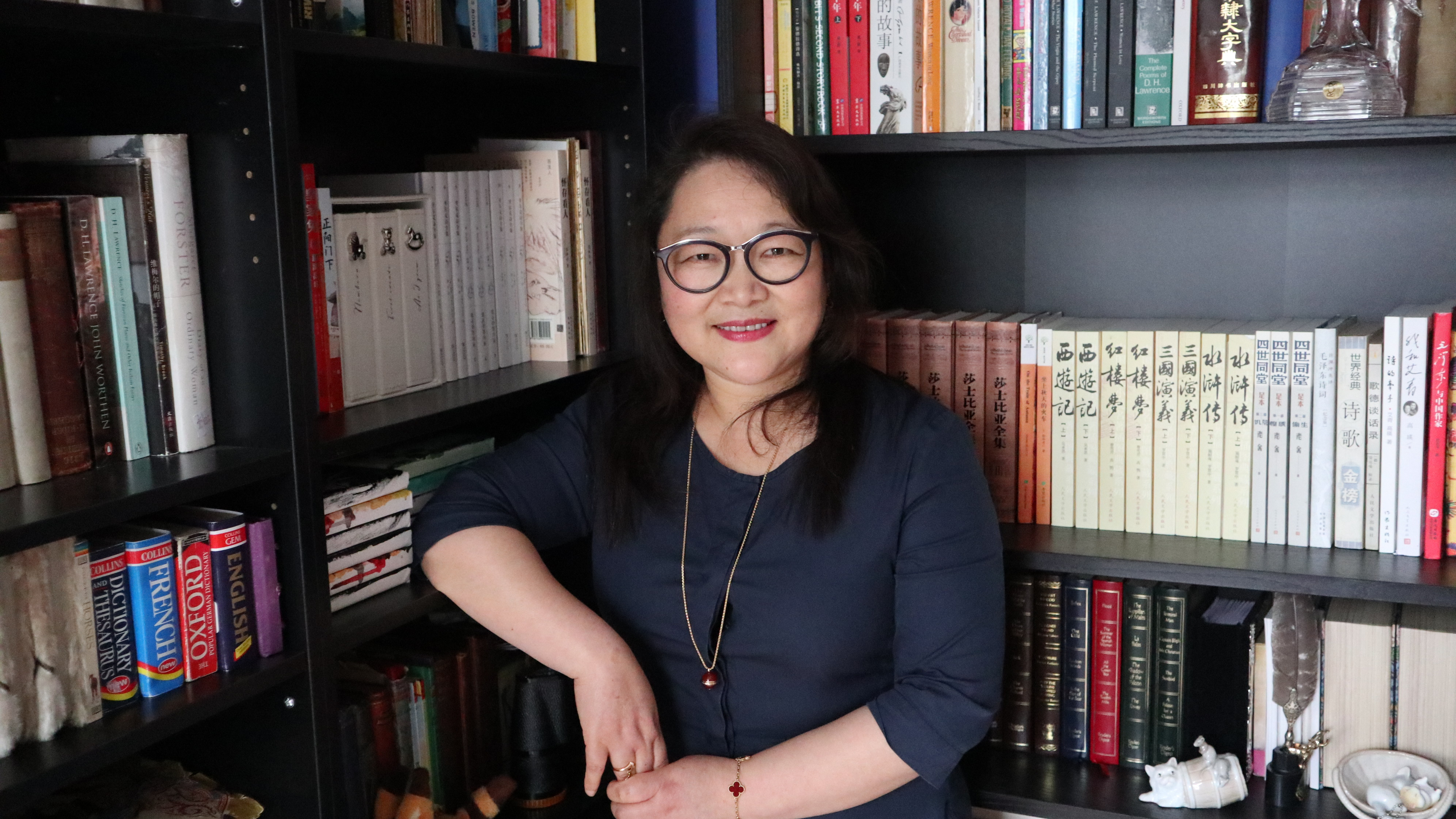
- Zhang Huaicun in 2020
- Born: December 1972 (age 53); Minhe Hui and Tu Autonomous County, Qinghai, China
- Education: Sun Yat-sen University
- Occupations: Novelist, teacher
- Writing career
- Pen name: 白靈
- Language: Chinese, English
- Period: 1998–present
- Genres: Poetry, Children's literature
- Notable works: One Snowflake; Listening to the Flower Bloom
- Notable awards: Bing Xin Children's Literature Award; 2020 On the Train of Autumn
- Website: penciltrees.co.uk

Huaicun (simplified Chinese: 张怀存; traditional Chinese: 張懷存; pinyin: Zhāng Huáicún; born December 1972) is a British Chinese artist, poet, and author of children's literature. She is of Tu ethnic minority heritage and is an Honorary Member and lifelong fellow of the Royal Society of British Artists, as well as a member of the Chinese Writers Association. She is also a member of the Chelsea Arts Club in London.

Huaicun is the founder of the charitable organisation Pencil Tree CIO and the Freya Foundation, both dedicated to children's education, art development, creative writing, and international cultural exchange.

She is the founder and namesake of the Huaicun Zhang Award, an international art award established in collaboration with the Royal Society of British Artists, and has initiated a number of charitable and cultural awards and programmes supporting emerging artists and cross-cultural dialogue, including support for the Rome Scholarship and Rising Star programmes.

== Biography ==
Zhang Huaicun, born in December 1972, Tu Ethnic Minority, British Chinese. Member of the Chinese Writers Association. Artist, author of children's literatures. Member of the Royal Society of British Artists.

Her Publication including Pencil Tree, One Snowflake, The Oasis in My Heart, The Red House, On the Train of Autumn, Space of Freedom, Huaicun and Her Friends, Listening to the Flower Bloom, Huaicun's Chinese Painting and Calligraphy. Held art exhibitions in Hong Kong, Macau, Seoul, Tokyo, New York City, Paris and other cities successfully. Translated The Sun on the Tree, My Name is Bob, BBC Nation's Favourite Poetry about Childhood and other English illustrated books and poetry selections. Her most recent books including: On the Train of Autumn and The Habitat for Fairy Tales. She lives in London now.

== Works ==
=== Poetry collection ===
- 1999 One Snowflake, Writers Publishing House
- 2000 The Oasis in My Heart, China Workers' Publishing House
- 2001 A Collection off Short Poems by Huaicun, Huaxia International Publishing House

=== Essay collection ===
- 2002 Listening to the Flower Bloom, Haifeng Publishing House
- 2005 Space of Freedom, China Pictorial Press
- 2007 Huaicun and Her Friends, Huacheng Publishing House
- 2019 On the Train of Autumn, Hope Publishing House

=== Children's poetry ===
- 2004 Pencil tree, Writers Publishing House
- 2009 Little Koala Bear on the Pencil tree, The Second Classroom
- 2011 Pencil tree : Illustrated Picture Book, China Children's Publishing House
- 2019 The Habitat for Fairy Tales, Beijing Children's Publishing House

=== Plays for children ===
- 2008-Huacheng Publishing House

Nap in Spring
Home For Bird Here and Everywhere
Talking Flowers
Play with the Sun
Looking for the Stars
The Fish From Next Door

=== Painting ===
- 2002 Collections of Zhang Huaicun's Paintings, inscription by Zhuang Shiping, People's Fine Arts Publishing House
- 2011 Collections of Huaicun's calligraphy and paintings, inscription by Rao Zongyi, Guangdong Education Publishing House

=== Work translated ===
- The Sun on the Tree, Heilongjiang Children's Publishing House, May 2018
- My name is Bob: An Illustrated Picture Book, Guangming Daily Press, May 2016
- The Red Tiles by Cao Wenxuan, Path International Ltd, UK, 2020

=== Editor-in-chief ===
- Cao Wenxuan' s Novel Collection, Guangdong Education Press, March 2011
- Green Apple Library Series, Guangdong Education Press, April 2012
- Cao Wenxuan' s Novel: Collector's Edition, Guangdong Education Publishing House, cover work by Zhang huaicun, January 2018
- Let’s read Cao Wenxuan, Changjiang literature and Art Publishing House, cover work by Zhang huaicun, August 2018
- Fire Osmanthus and Sweet Orange Tree by Cao Wenxuan, Peking University Press, with oil paintings by Zhang huaicun on the inside pages, February 2020

== Awards ==
- In October 2003: Art exhibition was held at the Hong Kong Cultural Centre.
- In October 2004: Pencil Tree Seminar jointly held by the creative research department of China Writers' Association, writers' Publishing House, Guangdong writers' Association and Shantou writers' Association.
- In 2004, Solo art exhibition held in Seoul, South Korea.
- In March 2005, Solo art exhibition in Tokyo, Japan.
- In May 2007, She participated in the sixth senior seminar for young and middle-aged writers and children's literature writers class hold by Lu Xun Literary Institute.
- In August 2007, essay Falling in love with Lu Xun Literary Institute was collected by Lu Xun Literary Institute.
- In November 2007, she represented Guangdong in the National Youth creative Congress.
- In July 2008, she won the title of National Charming Poet.
- In July 2020, On the Train of Autumn won the Bing Xin Children's Literature Award.
- In 2020, she won the Literary and Artistic Contribution Award from the Federal Government of the United States.
- In April 2021, Three large-scale ink paintings by Zhang Huaicun are on display at the RBA Annual Exhibition 2021.
- In July 2022, British Chinese artist Zhang Huaicun's solo exhibition "Huaicun's World Blossom" was initiated at the Mall Galleries in London. It was hosted by the Royal Society of British Artists, and attracted more than 300 people from all walks of life in China and the UK.
  Alongside the display of 58 traditional Chinese ink paintings, 23 oil paintings and illustrations from her children's books, a collection of handmade brushes, pigments and Seals and stamps made from jade etc. will also be exhibited.
- At the opening evening exhibition on 11 July 2022, Mr Davies on behalf of the RBA, awarded the Whistler award to Zhang in recognition of her artistic achievements.
