= Jay Hind! =

Indian television series

- Genre: Talk show; Sketch comedy; Stand-up comedy
- Directed by: Abhigyan Jha
- Presented by: Sumeet Raghavan
- Opening theme: "Sabse Pahle kuch nahi tha" by Scrubber Band
- Country of origin: India
- Original languages: Hindi; English

Production
- Producer: Mrinal Jha
- Running time: 24 minutes

Original release
- Release: 15 August 2009 – 2 October 2014

Jay Hind! is an Indian Hindi-language standup comedy and late-night talk show hosted by Sumeet Raghavan, which was broadcast on the internet. It was launched on 15 August 2009, and published new episodes twice a week. The final episode was broadcast in October 2014.

The show was created by Abhigyan Jha as a sequel to the late-night television comedy show Movers & Shakers. It was produced by Mrinal Jha for Undercover Productions Ltd. By 2014, the show had a team of 15 scriptwriters.

Jay Hind! included satirical commentary on current events, jokes about politicians and other public figures, and comedy about sexuality and other controversial subjects. The presenter and guests freely used profanity. In 2012, a skit about the Sikh runner Fauja Singh, which included jokes about the 1984 Sikh massacre, was sharply criticized by the Sikh community.

In 2011, the show's website was hacked by anti-Indian fundamentalist activists.

A version of the show adapted for television, called The Late Night Show, was broadcast on Colors TV. It debuted on television on 3 March 2012. The Late Night Show excluded some of the more controversial commentary, in order to be accepted for syndication.

There was also an English-language version of Jay Hind!, called Better Late Than Never, which focused on international news.

Abhigyan Jha was nominated for the Best Director (Comedy) award at the Indian Television Academy Awards in 2011, for his work with Jay Hind!.
