= Oxenberg =

Oxenberg or Oxenburg may refer to:

- Catherine Oxenberg (born 1961), American actress of Serbian origin
- Christina Oxenberg (born 1962), Serbian-American writer, humorist, and fashion designer
- India Oxenberg (born 1991), American film producer and child actress
- Jan Oxenberg, American film producer, film director, film editor and scenarist
- Allen Oxenburg (1927–1992), American opera director

== See also ==
- The Princes of Oxenburg, a series of books by American author Karen Hawkins
- Oxemberg, an Indian clothing brand
