= Rupan Deol Bajaj case =

Indian legal case

The Rupan Deol Bajaj case or Rupan Deol Bajaj vs KPS Gill case was one of the most publicized, high-profile legal cases in India and remained in the media limelight for many years.

In this high-profile case, KPS Gill, at the time Director General of Police, Punjab, was held guilty of the charges of molestation. On 20 August 1988, the High Court of Punjab and Haryana upheld Gill's conviction under Section 354 (outraging the modesty of a woman) and Section 509 (word, gesture or act intended to insult a lady) for his action against Rupan Deol Bajaj . Rupan Deol Bajaj was at that time an officer of the Indian Administrative Service (I.A.S) belonging to the Punjab Cadre. She filed a complaint against KPS Gill, saying that he had molested her modesty by patting her posterior during a party hosted on 18 July 1988 at the Chandigarh residence of then Punjab Financial Commissioner, S L Kapoor. She was at that time working as the Special Secretary, Finance, as an I.A.S. officer.

Her husband, Mr. B.R. Bajaj, a senior I.A.S. officer of the Punjab Cadre, had filed a complaint in the Court of the Chief Judicial Magistrate for the same offences, described above, against KPS Gill and was a party to the case.

== Trial and sentencing ==
In 2005, the Supreme Court of India upheld the charges and conviction of KPS Gill for the offence. He was spared from undergoing the three-month jail sentence as it was converted into probation by Punjab and Haryana High Court. KPS Gill was sentenced to pay a fine of Rs 200,000, be imprisoned rigorously for 3 months and simply for 2 months, and finally to serve 3 years of probation. Rupan Deol Bajaj declined to accept the monetary compensation. The court ordered that it be donated to women's organizations. After final appeals before the Supreme Court of India in July 2005 the conviction was upheld and the jail sentences were reduced to probation.

== Media reaction ==
Rupan Deol Bajaj was highly praised in the media for both filing a case against such a powerful officer of police and for refusing to be intimidated.

In 2010, after the Government's decision to strip police officers convicted of 'moral turpitude' of medals and awards, she demanded that the Government take back the Padma Shri award given to KPS Gill. She wanted the Government to move against Gill in the same manner as it was proceeding against ex-Haryana top cop SPS Rathore, to strip him of his police medal in the aftermath of the Ruchika Girhotra molestation case.
