= Bhakton Ki Bhakti Mein Shakti =

- Inter-title
- Genre: Drama
- Written by: Saba Mumtaz
- Directed by: Saba Mumtaz
- Starring: Saurabh Raj Jain; Fahad Ali; Ashish Sharma
- Opening theme: Jai Mata Di
- Country of origin: India
- Original language: Hindi
- No. of seasons: 1
- No. of episodes: 32

Production
- Producers: Sachin Mohite; Sourabh Shrivastava
- Production location: Mumbai
- Running time: Approx 45 minutes
- Production companies: Jaasvand Enterprise; SMS Entertainment

Original release
- Network: Life OK
- Release: 9 April – 17 July 2016

Bhakton Ki Bhakti Mein Shakti is an Indian drama television series which aired from 9 April 2016 to 17 July 2016 on Life OK. Saurabh Raj Jain played the lead role.

== Cast ==
- Saurabh Raj Jain as Host
- Mouli Ganguly as Shivangi (Episode 2)
- Mazher Sayed as Inspector Mannu (Episode 2)
- Neetha Shetty as Rishika (Episode 1)
- Sachin Shroff as Rishika's Husband (Episode 1)
- Vaishnavi Dhanraj as Aditi (Episode 17)
- Vishal Watwani as Tejas (Episode 20)
- Kajal Jain as Maithili (Episode 29)
- Manoj Chandila as Girish (Episode 9)
- Vaishali Takkar as Shraddha (Episode 19)
- Debina Bonnerjee as Inspector Shyama Ganguly (Episode 26)
- Nayan Bhatt as Kasturi (Episode 1)
- Gauri Singh as Head of News Channel (Episode 3)
- Shahab Khan as Mr. Sethi (Episode 3)
- Shweta Gautam as Raj's Elder Brother's Wife (Episode 4)
- Bhavesh Balchandani as Mannu (Episode 11)
- Fahad Ali as Sagar (Episode 15)
- Mehul Kajaria as Anil (Episode 24)
