= Kaahin Kissii Roz =

Indian thriller television series

- Genre: Thriller
- Created by: Balaji Telefilms
- Developed by: Ekta Kapoor
- Screenplay by: Al-Raines; Pramod Singh; Dialogues; Pramod Singh; M P Anamika
- Story by: Mrinal Jha
- Directed by: Santram Varma; Yash Chauhan
- Creative directors: Prashant Bhatt; Nivedita Basu
- Starring: See Below
- Opening theme: "Kaahin Kissii Roz" by Sunidhi Chauhan
- Country of origin: India
- Original language: Hindi
- No. of seasons: 1
- No. of episodes: 895

Production
- Producers: Ekta Kapoor; Shobha Kapoor
- Cinematography: Deepak Malwankar; Sanjay Memane
- Editors: Dharmesh Shah; Dhiren Singh
- Running time: 21 minutes

Original release
- Network: StarPlus
- Release: 23 April 2001 – 23 September 2004

Kaahin Kissii Roz (transl. Somewhere, Someday) is an Indian thriller television series that was broadcast on StarPlus from 23 April 2001 to 23 September 2004. It is digitally available on Hotstar. The series starred Mouli Ganguly, Yash Tonk and Sudha Chandran in the lead roles.

== Plot summary ==
The story revolves around Shaina & Ramola. Kunal is also an important character. Ramola is behind the family's money whereas Shaina tries to challenge her every move. In the middle there is Kunal with webs of deception at the crux of the story that is 'Kahin kisi roz'.

== Cast ==
- Sudha Chandran as Ramola Sikand
- Mouli Ganguly as Shaina Sikand/ Sunaina Sikand died alias Devika Sikand (before plastic surgery) / Mansi (Shaina's lookalike) / Devika (after rebirth)
- Yash Tonk as Kunal Sikand / Shaan (after memory loss) / Kuljeet (Kunal's lookalike) / Nikhil (after rebirth)
- Shweta Salve as Anisha Shaina Second After Surgery (wife of Nikhil, daughter of ACP Verma)
- Smita Kalpavriksha Gupta as Sunaina Sikand (before plastic surgery)
- Poonam Narula as Malini Sikand (Alive) / Sunaina (before plastic surgery) looks Alike Radha Malhotra Dr. Suraj
- Manish Khanna as Ratan Raheja (Ramola's brother, father of Apoorva and Raashi)
- Gauri Tonk as Nisha Sikand
- Pratiba Kapoor as Nisha's mother
- Mazher Sayed as Anish Sikand
- Hiten Tejwani replaced by Vishal Watwani (2002–2003) as Nakul Sikand
- Kanika Kohli as Sunidhi Sikand (2002–2003)
- Abhilin Pandey as Mohit
- Sushmita Mukherjee as Avanti Rajpal
- Mohan Kapoor as Dhananjay Rajpal alias 'DJ'
- Rahil Azam as Karan Seth (Mansi's husband)
- Rohit Bakshi replaced by Sikandar Kharbanda as Vikram
- Nandita Thakur as Nirupa Sikand
- Kamini Khanna replaced by Ruma Sengupta as Daiji
- Raavee Gupta replaced by Nivedita Bhattacharya as Monica Bose
- Shalini Kapoor Sagar replaced by Suchitra Bandekar as Natasha Sikand
- Malvika Shivpuri replaced by Monalika Bhonsle as Avantika Sikand
- Pamela Mukherjee as Malvika Sikand
- Mayuri Kango as Malaika Rajpal
- Amita Chandekar as Malini Original (before plastic surgery)
- Itishree Singh as Surabhi
- Surbhi Tiwari as Bhairavi
- Sudesh Berry as DJ's partner
- Manish Raisinghani as Apoorva Sikand
- Nazneen Patel as Rashi Sikand
- Naveen Saini as Aman
- Pawan Chopra as Akash
- Manoj Bidwai as Praveen
- Puneet Vashisht as Anupam
- Darshil Mashru as Aditya
- Palak Jain as Aditi
- Dheeraj Sarna as Aseem
- Kanika Shivpuri as Jasvinder Kaur, Kuljeet's mother
- Abhijeet Khurana as Karan
- Manini Mishra as Sanya
- Pratichi Mishra as Mohini
- Vishal Kotian as Raja
- Gaurav Gera
- Mahesh Kanwal
- Harshula Jhala as Aditi
- Firdaus Dadi as Nandini (Kuljeet's nurse working for Ramola)
- Saptrishi Ghosh as ACP Verma (after a twenty-year leap, DIG Verma)
- Ajit Mehra as Dr khurana (plastic surgeon of Sunaina/Shaina. Later killed by Ramola)

== Production ==
=== Development ===
The storyline of the series took a twenty-year leap in January 2004.

=== Casting ===
In March 2004, lead Mouli Ganguly quit the series stating monotonicity.

== Reception ==
=== Ratings ===
The show opened with a low rating of 2.2 TVR in its debut week. But it saw a decline in ratings at its prime slot of 8:00 pm (IST) and thus that slot was taken by Kasautii Zindagii Kay in October 2001 while Kaahin shifted to a late night slot of 11.00 pm (IST). The decision was in show's favor as it became the first show to rake at good ratings ranging more than 5 TVR in that slot, also entering top ten weekly list of most watched Indian programs, which was before considered as a dead slot. In week 45 of 2002, it was at seventh position with 5.94 TVR. However, in September 2003, it was pushed to 11:30 pm (IST) slot after which the ratings of the series decreased the following weeks, garnering 3.4, 3.1 and 2.7 TVR during the following three weeks. Later, it settled down between 3.5 and 4 TVR.

=== Critics ===
India Today stated Sudha Chandran's role Ramola Sikand being one of the ideal vamps of Indian television.

=== Impact ===
A snacks shop named Bunty Juice Centre at Borivali in Mumbai sold juices with different flavours under the names of Balaji Telefilms soap operas including the series Kaahin Kissi Roz.

=== Re-Run ===
The show is re-telecasted on Star Plus since 4 July 2022 at 3:30 PM.

== Awards ==
=== Indian Telly Awards ===
- 2003; Best Music Director - Lalit Sen
- 2003; Best Editor (Fiction) - Diren Singh
