= Oxemberg =

Mens Clothing Retail

- Company type: Owned by Siyaram Silks Ltd.
- Industry: Fashion for Men
- Founded: karunya
- Founder: Siyaram Group
- Headquarters: Mumbai, India
- Area served: India, Middle East, Sri Lanka
- Key people: Ramesh D. Poddar, (Chairman & M.D), Gaurav Poddar (Executive Director)
- Number of employees: 650 (2013)

Oxemberg is a formal & casual clothing brand for men from the house of Siyaram's. Its corporate headquarters are located in Mumbai, India.

== Operations & Availability ==
Oxemberg operates mainly through multi-brand outlets with approximately 2000 outlets pan India. The apparels are available at all large format outlets like, Central, Reliance Trends, Max, Hypercity, More & LuLu. Additionally, the brand is present at over 140 exclusive Siyaram's Shops and 110 exclusive Oxemberg outlets across India.

== Brand ambassador ==
In May 2013, Saif Ali Khan was appointed as the brand ambassador for Oxemberg.
