= Mazher Sayed =

Indian television actor

- Born: 5 March; Mumbai
- Occupations: Actor; Host; Model
- Years active: 2001–present
- Known for: Kaahin Kissii Roz Sasural Simar Ka
- Spouse: Mouli Ganguly (m. 2010)

Mazher Sayed is an Indian actor. A veteran of the Indian television industry for over two decades, he has played many roles in various Hindi television shows. He is well known for his portrayal of Anish in Ekta Kapoor's popular hit thriller series Kaahin Kissii Roz that aired from 2001–2004 on Star Plus. He is currently seen as Inspector in Crime Patrol solving Crime & Murder Cases.

== Early life ==
He has completed his high schooling from International Indian School Riyadh. He studied at Jamnabai Narsee School and graduated from Mithibai College with a bachelor's degree in commerce.

== Career ==
Sayed started his career with the popular show Kaahin Kissii Roz. He started doing theatre shows at an early age and worked with veterans like Salim Ghouse, Kader Khan, and Atul Kumar.

He went on to do shows such as Kuch Jhuki Palkien, and Kamini Damini with Hema Malini. He also appeared in Saat Phere, Kahani Ghar Ghar Ki, Rakt Sambandh and Chajje Chajje Ka Pyaar. In 2013 he was seen in Colors' show Mrs. Pammi Pyarelal.

He did episodes for Saavdhaan India and Crime Patrol. He was a participant in reality dance show Nach Baliye season four with actress and wife Mouli Ganguly.

He also appeared in commercials for Colgate, Castrol GTX, and others.

He played the main male lead role of Prem Rajendra Bharadwaj in Sasural Simar Ka on Colors TV.

== Personal life ==
He married his co-star from Kaahin Kissii Roz, Mouli Ganguly, in 2010. He is also the co-owner of an event management company called Gyan Productions.

== Filmography ==
=== Films ===
Year	Title	Role	Notes	Ref.
2011	Yeh Faasley	Unknown		
2020	My Client's Wife	Cable operator		

=== Television ===
Year	Title	Role	Notes	Ref.
2001	Ssshhhh...Koi Hai	Abee		
2001–2003	Kaahin Kissii Roz	Anish Sikand		
2004	Raat Hone Ko Hai	Santosh	Story: "Contest #86"	
2004–2005	Kesar	Dr. Walia		
2004–2005	Kamini Damini	Damini's son		
2005–2009	Saat Phere – Saloni Ka Safar	Samar Singh		
2006–2008	Kahaani Ghar Ghar Kii	Sameer Kaul		
2008–2009	Nach Baliye 4	Contestant	10th place	
2010–2011	Rakt Sambandh	Rohit Deshmukh		
2011	Sammaan Ek Adhikaar	Aadhaar "Addy"		
2013	Mrs. Pammi Pyarelal	Ranjit Faujdar		
2013–2023	Crime Patrol	P. I. Ajay Kumar / P. I. Vijay Gaikwad / P. I. Ranjeet Sharma / P. I. Sarthak Gangwar (Note: Sayed played several characters in Crime Patrol, from 2013 to 2023. He played an inspector several times and few of them are listed here.)		
2014	Encounter	Sub Inspector Manish Kadam		
2015	Yeh Rishta Kya Kehlata Hai	Sameer Desai		
2015	Naagin	Suri		
2016	Devanshi	Ashish "Rasik" Upadhyay		
2016	Bhakton Ki Bhakti Mein Shakti	Inspector Mannu	Episode 2	
2017–2018	Sasural Simar Ka	Prem Bharadwaj		
2018–2019	Crime Patrol Dial 100	Inspector Balbeer Solanki		
2024	Janani – AI Ki Kahani	Virat Sharma		
2025–present	Anupamaa	Anil Kothari		
