= Kaali – Ek Agnipariksha =

Indian crime thriller series

- Genre: Crime thriller
- Created by: Mrinal Jha; Abhigyan Jha
- Directed by: Yash Chauhan; Sushen Bhatnagar; Vicky Chauhan
- Starring: See below
- Narrated by: Mrinal Kulkarni
- Country of origin: India
- Original language: Hindi
- No. of episodes: 136

Production
- Producers: Mrinal Jha; Abhigyan Jha
- Running time: 24 minutes

Original release
- Network: StarPlus
- Release: 13 September 2010 – 18 March 2011

Kaali – Ek Agnipariksha is an Indian crime thriller series that aired on StarPlus from 13 September 2010 to 18 March 2011. The series is inspired from Ruchika Girhotra case.

== Synopsis ==
Mehta family, a simple and middle-class family with middle-class values and dreams composed of Veerender Mehta and his two children 16-year-old Rachna and 11-year-old Rahul. Rachana is a girl with big dreams who is sure to make a mark in Badminton one day. Rachana's cousin, Anu is her best friend. Rachana is all through encouraged in her pursuit of playing Badminton by her family. And it's during this pursuit that the menacing bahubali of her town- Thakral, lays his eyes on her. It is from here on the journey of Rachana who decides to fight back against the big and mighty Thakral. Anu stands by Rachana and they remain deeply connected through the terror and trauma that Thakral unleashes on Rachana and her family. The story is the tale of Rachana who belongs to a small, peaceful and happy family and what happens to her and her family when disaster strikes in the form of a monster of a man called Thakral the Bahubali of Ghaziabad.

== Cast ==
- Ashutosh Rana as Keshav Thakral, character inspired by Shambu (S.P.S. Rathore).
- Swati Kapoor as Rachana, character inspired by Ruchika, an Indian badminton player.
- Nia Sharma as Anu, Rachna's cousin and her best-friend
- Varun Jain as Arjun
- Arif Zakaria as Virendra, Rachana's father
- Perin Malde as Rahul, Rachana's brother
- Vipra Rawal as Rajni
- Pranitaa Pandit as Janvi Thakral, Keshav Thakral's daughter
- Akshay Anand as Amar
- Dimple Inamdar as Rajshree
- Neelu Kohli as Babli
- Mrinal Kulkarni as Sushma Rai / Aditi Chaudhary
- Anuj Thakur as Mohit
- Aham Sharma as Aditya Ahlawat
- Sonali Kulkarni as Narrator
- Aarun Nagar as Birju
- Dinesh Sharma as Siddharth
