= Saaksshi =

- Promotional logo
- Genre: Crime
- Written by: Anuradha Tiwari
- Directed by: Rakesh Sarang
- Starring: See below
- Country of origin: India
- Original language: Hindi
- No. of seasons: 1
- No. of episodes: 48

Production
- Camera setup: Multi-camera
- Running time: Approx. 24 minutes
- Production company: Cinevistaas Limited

Original release
- Network: Sony Entertainment Television
- Release: 10 April 2004

Saaksshi is an Indian crime television series based on the story of an undercover cop Saaksshi Singh in an anti-terrorist squad. The series premiered on Sony TV on 10 April 2004, and starring Mouli Ganguly.

== Cast ==
- Mouli Ganguly as Saaksshi Singh
- Samir Soni as Shekhar Gupta
- Amit Sadh as Deepak
- Hrishikesh Pandey

== Plot ==
Saaksshi is the story of an Indian middle-class girl who lives with her family of a brother, sister and her parents. Saaksshi's brother is an Army officer who has been missing since his last mission in Kashmir. Saaksshi's mother, deeply affected by his absence, has been awaiting his arrival. Saaksshi, a courageous activist, tries to bond her family in the best possible way.

A chance encounter with a terrorist and an anti terrorism squad changes Saaksshi's life. ASTRA - the anti terrorism squad headed by Shekhar (Sameer Soni) asks Saaksshi to join their mission as they feel she can make a difference to society. Saaksshi initially rejects the offer but later accepts and chooses to keep this a secret from her family. Saaksshi starts work and is part of several cases related to terrorism, putting her own life in danger.

Saaksshi is surprised to learn that her own boss Shekhar is actually a spy and an informer looking for a data CD to sell information to other spies. Saaksshi is wounded while trying to stop him and is framed and declared a spy herself. After a heated chase, Saaksshi manages to expose Shekhar and kills him. After the incident, Saaksshi quits ASTRA. Saaksshi now plans for a normal family life. When she is about to marry, Saaksshi's fiancée is killed on the wedding day and Saaksshi is framed once again. The murder is executed by Shekhar's brother (Deepraj Rana) who has arrived to take revenge. Saaksshi manages to find out about him and breaks out from jail to settle scores.

The show abruptly ended when Saaksshi is shown to have been killed by Shekhar's brother when the truck she is travelling crashes.
