= Sacred Evil – A True Story =

Sacred Evil
- Directed by: Abhigyan Jha; Abhiyan Rajhans
- Screenplay by: Abhigyan Jha; Mrinal Jha
- Based on: Sacred Evil: Encounters With the Unknown by Ipsita Roy Chakraverti
- Produced by: Abhigyan Jha
- Starring: Sarika; Lynsey Pow; Frédéric Andrau
- Cinematography: Ivan Kozelka
- Edited by: Sanjib Datta
- Music by: Claver Menezes
- Production companies: Sahara One Motion Pictures; Undercover Productions
- Distributed by: Percept Pictures Company
- Release date: 2006
- Running time: 109 minutes
- Country: India
- Languages: Hindi; English

Sacred Evil (Hindi: Gehra Paani) is a 2006 Indian supernatural/surreal film directed by Abhigyan Jha and Abhiyan Rajhans. It is based on the book Sacred Evil: Encounters With the Unknown by Indian Wiccan priestess Ipsita Roy Chakraverti and portrays various cases of healing described in the book. The film stars actress Sarika as Ipsita.

== Plot ==
Based on a true story from the case files of a real-life Wiccan, Ipsita Roy Chakraverti, Sacred Evil is the story of three women separated by a twenty-year-old secret: a nun, a Wiccan, and a girl in search of her mother.

The nun is Martha, a 45-year-old withering woman who lives in a secluded convent in Calcutta. Even in the sanctuary of the church, she is haunted by a specter that threatens her sanity. The Wiccan, Ipsita, is called upon by the unconventional Mother Superior to heal Martha's soul.

The task is difficult as Martha is reticent about talking about the events in her past. Using her skills as a healer and her training as a Jungian psychotherapist, Ipsita gradually opens the door to Martha's story of the one who haunts her.

An Anglo-Indian girl called Claudia grows up with the angst of not knowing her mother, Maureen, alienated in her Indian surroundings by her blue eyes and blonde hair.

The story now goes back and forth as events from Claudia's life begin to intersect Martha's, and Ipsita tries to sort out the tangled threads of the past and present. In her search for the lost Maureen, whom everyone says looked much like her, Claudia becomes obsessed with her mother's image. She begins to turn into her mother. Like her, she seeks out and falls in love with a foreigner, Pierre, a young Frenchman who is in Calcutta for a doctorate. But Pierre is never sure who is in love with him, Claudia or Maureen.

As she tries to heal Martha with centuries-old Egyptian rituals of the Wicca, Ipsita learns of Claudia's struggle to keep her sanity and Martha's attempts to save her soul — how she tried hard to bring her to the church and let God heal her. Ipsita also learns that somewhere the attempts failed. Something happened. Claudia's burden became Martha's. With her own efforts failing to heal Martha's spirit, Ipsita is led to a startling discovery in the end, which makes her wonder if the sacred will ever be as strong in us as the evil is.

== Cast ==
- Sarika as Ipsita
- Lynsey Pow as Claudia and Martha
- Frédéric Andrau as Pierre

== Music ==
1. Tu Pyaar Ka Saagar Hai" - Asmita Sen
2. O Majhi" - Kailash Kher

== Reception ==
=== Critical and commercial ===
Upon its release, the movie received mixed reviews from critics and was compared to Satyajit Ray's work.

Commercially the film fared poorly as it was released without proper context by Percept Picture Company in India; it has still not been released in Europe, USA and Canada — the markets for which the film was made. The Indian audience found it difficult to grasp the conflict between the church and the Wiccan and the subdued and surreal drama. A lot of people in India refer to Sacred Evil as a horror film though it is not in the horror genre. It deals with the paranormal, but it is more about alienation and loneliness and how strange life can be than ghosts and goblins.

=== Political ===
The Catholic Secular Forum demanded a separate screening of the film as they said that it promoted witchcraft and violence and indoctrinated the people in evil. There were warnings of possible arson and violence.
