= Mumbai Chakachak =

- Directed by: Sanjay Jha Mastan
- Produced by: Sunil Shetty; Brihanmumbai Municipal Corporation; Popcorn Motion Pictures
- Starring: Cyrus Broacha; Mandira Bedi; Rahul Bose; Ayesha Dharker; Vinay Pathak
- Cinematography: Rajeev Shrivastava
- Release date: May 2009
- Country: India
- Language: Hindi

Mumbai Chakachak is a Hindi film produced by Suniel Shetty and the Municipal Corporation of Greater Mumbai as part of their clean-up campaign. The movie was released in May 2009. The film featured Rahul Bose and Ayesha Dharker, Mandira Bedi and Vinay Pathak in lead roles. It is the first commercial movie of BMC for their clean-up campaign. The film's message of keeping the city clean is conveyed in a subtle way without being preachy.

== Plot ==
The movie tells the story of Koka, a BMC employee residing in the BMC Colony at Colaba in Mumbai, who desires to make Mumbai as clean as Shanghai. He falls in love with Basmati, a girl from Bihar who aspires to become an air hostess. Koka's ultimate goal is to keep the city clean and he works tirelessly to achieve this.

== Production and release ==
The film was announced by Suniel Shetty, who produced the film. Mahindra & Mahindra, an automotive manufacturing company was also engaged in the production of Mumbai Chakachak.

Mumbai Chakachak was made under the banner of Popcorn Motion Pictures. The film was directed by Sanjay Jha Mastan, features music composed by Shamir Tandon and lyrics written by Piyush Pandey.
