= Pishachini =

Indian supernatural series

- Genre: Supernatural; Drama
- Written by: Mrinal Jha
- Screenplay by: Mrinal Jha; Surbhi Sharma
- Story by: Mrinal Jha
- Starring: See below
- Opening theme: Raat Rani.... Pishachini
- Country of origin: India
- Original language: Hindi
- No. of seasons: 1
- No. of episodes: 114

Production
- Producers: Mrinal Jha; Abhigyan Jha; Shyamashish Bhattacharya; Nilima Bajpai
- Production location: Mumbai
- Camera setup: Multi-camera
- Running time: 18-32 min
- Production companies: Shakuntalam Telefilms; Mrinal and Abhigyan Jha Production

Original release
- Network: Colors TV
- Release: 8 August 2022 – 13 January 2023

Pishachini (transl. Demoness) is an Indian Hindi-language television supernatural drama series that aired from 8 August 2022 to 13 January 2023 on Colors TV. It is digitally available on JioHotstar. Produced by Shakuntalam Telefilms and MAJ Productions, it stars Nyra Banerjee, Jiya Shankar and Harsh Rajput.

== Premise ==
The show is set against the backdrop of Bareilly where a beautiful girl (actually a Pishachini) named Rani, seeks revenge from the Rajput family for settling on her land. Rani was an evil and greedy woman when she was a human but due to her misdeeds and murders, she was cursed to become a Pishachini after her death. She wants to destroy the Rajputs and use their blood to bring her child to life, who will become the most powerful Pishacha as it will be a crossbreed of a demon and human. But a divine power rises to stop her from winning. It is the granddaughter of the priest (Pandit Ji or Nanu) who had imprisoned Rani in a box years ago, Pavitra, who now lives in London after Rani's curse killed most of her family except her aunt Kanika, who raised her. Pavitra has the mark of Lord Hanuman on her hand which actually has many hidden powers she is still not aware of. Rani escaped from the box after some tim3 of her imprisonment, by tempting the younger son of the Rajput family, Prateek and manipulated his greed for money as Pishachinis can grant any wish but the price paid for that deal is very horrible, which is the reason why the Rajputs do not speak with him and his wife Amrita anymore. But his daughter, Nikita, is getting married, whose friend is Pavitra and she is forced to come to India, where she meets Rakshit (Rocky), the grandson of the Rajput family, and he takes an instant liking towards her but she does not immediately reciprocate his feelings.

The Rajputs reach Chail for the wedding while Rani enchants Rocky as she wants to impregnate herself with his child and become the most powerful dark entity. Pavitra senses something is wrong and Ayodhya, Rocky's grandfather who knows Rani's truth, is attacked by her and is left paralyzed. Rani manipulates Rocky's sister Shikha and promises to cure the scar on her face if she is taken back to Bareilly where her original land is. Pavitra follows them as she knows about her Nanu's past and his relation with the Pishachini, which claimed her family and she does not want the same fate to be repeated with any other family and hence wants to protect them from the Pishachini, who is disguised as a normal human amongst them. Rani enters the household as a prospective bride for Rocky and he agrees to marry her as he falls for her delusions.

Pavitra collects clues and pieces them together to unearth that Rani is indeed the Pishachini she is looking for and she is the evil entity her Nanu had asked her to destroy before taking his last breathe, and she must stop her from marrying Rocky before it is too late. Pavitra makes various attempts to expose Rani but no one believes her as all her plans fail due to Rani's wicked conspiracies. Rocky does not trust her claims either and asks her to leave India. To protect Rocky from Rani and to thwart all her ulterior motives, Pavitra marries him herself under the veil to everyone's shock. The Rajputs do not accept the marriage, and Rocky, after some initial hesitation, agrees to take Pavitra as his wife. Rani vows to defeat Pavitra and their fight begins. Rani tricks Pavitra and marries Rocky's elder brother Sanchit by enchanting him and faking the death of her parents and sister. She becomes pregnant, and Pavitra must find a way to end her. To her horror, Ayodhya is also transformed into a Pishacha as are Prateek and Amrita, the couple dies but Ayodhya survives and continues to help Rani and fool everyone. Rani starts manipulating everyone against Pavitra to oust her from the house but she retaliates and Rani's truth is exposed to Rocky who apologizes to Pavitra, and agrees to help her defeat Rani. Pavitra starts discovering her powers and learns that she is the only one capable of killing the Pishachini. Rani's plot of acquiring the Maha-Pishacha crown (to become the strongest Pishacha) on Dusshera is foiled by Pavitra who gains the divine powers of the Goddess Durga and uses a trident to break the crown. Rocky becomes invisible and disappears later on into the Pishacha world but Pavitra, who realizes she has fallen in love with him, brings him back and they unite. They free Sanchit from Rani's control and use the unborn child of Rani as a bait to trap her and unveil her reality to the rest of the family. The Rajputs are shocked when they realize Rani's truth and apologize to Pavitra for not trusting her earlier and even humiliating her at many instances, while she was fighting to protect them all this time.

Rani is trapped to a tree and the Rajputs think they won but then Maha-Pishacha comes to the house to take Pavitra and sacrifice her to dark forces so that he can gain infinite powers, in the disguise of Shikha's boyfriend, Veer. Rocky realizes Veer's truth and he rushes to rescue Pavitra who has embarked on a journey with Veer, not knowing that he wants to kill her. Rocky gets help from an unexpected source, the Nashak, who knows about the evil forces and how to stop them, and the Nashak is revealed to be Pavitra's aunt, Kanika. Kanika and Rocky encourage Pavitra when she falls weak in front of Maha Pishacha's power but she rises again and kills him. Shikha is hurt after Veer's death and blames Pavitra even after knowing he was evil and blindly agrees to release Rani to get revenge from Pavitra. Rani returns and pretends to have changed and takes the family to a lava pool to test her purity, which is actually a trap and they get surrounded by Agni Vetaals who are zombie-like creatures. Pavitra gains divine help and defeats the Vetaals to protect her family but Rocky gets bitten by one and is infected and starts becoming an Agni Vetaal himself. Kanika heals him temporarily while Rani is locked inside a cave by Pavitra after the battle. Sanchit dies due to Shikha's mistake and Pavitra takes the blame on herself to save Shikha, who realizes she was wrong for helping Rani as Pavitra did nothing unjust ever. The Pishacha Ayodhya is released as well by Sudhakar and Sapna accidentally and he puts Pavitra under a trance like state through a spell but Rocky's true love brings her back into consciousness. The real Ayodhya is separated from the Pishacha one and the latter is annihilated but Rani returns to the house disguised as Sanchit's friend Shreya to mourn his death, as she gained the powers of a Sarp or a shapeshifting snake from the cave Pavitra had trapped her in. She tricks everyone and transforms Rocky into an Agni Vetaal and he forgets his real self and past memories and agrees to marry Rani, mistreating his family members and denying his love for Pavitra.

Pavitra loses Rocky and her family is also pushed behind a mirror world by Rani, and she feels helpless. But Kanika fills her with confidence and she agrees to revive Rocky into a human again, rescue her family and end Rani. After much struggle, the Rajput family reunites and they trick Rani and kill her helper Mandy, a shapeshifting frog. They are also able to heal Rocky who becomes a human again and he reunites with Pavitra. The family makes a trap for Rani during the wedding rituals. Rani unleashes her terror and her snake ally tries to consume the Rajputs, but then Pavitra takes the form of Goddess Durga and kills the giant snake. Rani's unborn child also does not take her side and turns against her, Rani is forced to escape once she realizes she has been overpowered. Kanika dies while protecting Rocky's younger cousin Vidya and gives her Nashak powers to Vidya. Vidya becomes the next Nashak and helps Pavitra and Rocky to find a way to kill Rani once and for all. Rani kills the Pishacha Devata and becomes a ten-headed Pralaya Pishachini (the ultimate and the most destructive Pishachini) and ends up taking Ayodhya's life. Pavitra will not let Rani take away any of her loved ones again and prepares to fight her, even agreeing to sacrifice herself for their sake. There is one final confrontation between Pavitra, Rocky, Nashak (Vidya), all the remaining Rajputs and the Pralaya Pishachini. Rocky earns magical wings due to Lord Hanuman's blessings and at last Rani is vanquished by Pavitra and the Rajputs after a prolonged battle, when Pavitra attacks the back of Rani's head where her mortal wound was concealed. The Rajputs celebrate their victory over the dark force that has been haunting them for years. Rocky and Pavitra adopt Sanchit and Rani's Pishacha child as their own and are blessed with their own daughter later on. Everything seems to be going good and positive for the family, but dark forces once again descend on earth to claim Rani's daughter.

== Cast and characters ==
=== Main ===
- Nyra Banerjee as Raat Rani Singh Rajput — A Powerful Pishachini; Sanchit's wife; mother of a baby boy; Pavitra's biggest enemy (Dead)
- Jiya Shankar as Pavitra "Piku" Singh Rajput — A girl with divine powers; Rakshit's wife; mother of a baby girl; Rani's biggest enemy
- Amit Mehra as Sanchit Singh Rajput — Sudhakar and Sapna's son; Rakshit and Shikha's brother; Manohar, Babli, Prateek and Amrita's nephew; Vidya and Nikita's cousin; Rani's husband; father of a baby boy (Dead)
- Harsh Rajput as Rakshit "Rocky" Singh Rajput — Sudhakar and Sapna's son; Sanchit and Shikha's brother; Manohar, Babli, Prateek and Amrita's nephew; Vidya and Nikita's cousin; Pavitra's husband; father of a baby girl

=== Recurring ===
- Susheel Parashar as Ayodhya Singh Rajput — Sudhakar, Manohar and Prateek's father; Sapna, Babli and Amrita's father-in-law; Sanchit, Rakshit, Shikha, Vidya and Nikita's grandfather; Rani's puppet temporarily (Dead)
- Sachin Parikh as Sudhakar Singh Rajput — Sapna's husband; Sanchit, Rakshit and Shikha's father
- Anjali Gupta as Sapna Singh Rajput — Sudhakar's wife; Sanchit, Rakshit and Shikha's mother
- Rutuja Sawant as Shikha Singh Rajput — Sudhakar and Sapna's daughter; Sanchit and Rakshit's sister; Manohar, Babli, Prateek and Amrita's niece; Vidya and Nikita's cousin; Rani's puppet
- Sagar Rambhia as Manohar Singh Rajput — Babli's husband; Vidya's father
- Jhumma Mitra as Babli Singh Rajput — Manohar's wife; Vidya's mother
- Meghna Kukreja as Vidya Singh Rajput — The New Nashak; Manohar and Babli's daughter; Sudhakar, Sapna, Prateek and Amrita's niece; Sanchit, Rakshit, Shikha and Nikita's cousin
- Priyank Tatariya as Prateek Singh Rajput — Amrita's husband; Nikita's father; Rani's puppet (Dead)
- Shweta Dadhich as Amrita Singh Rajput — Prateek's wife; Nikita's mother; Rani's puppet (Dead)
- Saumya Saraswat as Nikita Singh Rajput — Prateek and Amrita's daughter; Sudhakar, Sapna, Manohar and Babli's niece; Sanchit, Rakshit, Shikha and Vidya's cousin
- Amit Behl as Pandit Ji — Kanika's father; Pavitra's grandfather (Dead)
- Raymon Singh as Kanika Sharma — The Old Nashak — Pandit Ji's daughter; Pavitra's aunt (Dead)
- Shrey Mittal as Veer - A Maha-Pishacha (Dead)
- Raghav Binani as Mandy – A humanified Frog; Rani's puppet and helper
- Garima Dixit as Himani – Sanchit's fiancée; Rani's puppet (Dead)
- Farukh Khan – Himani and Vikas's father; Rani's puppet and fake father (Dead)
- Reshma Merchant as Suddha – Himani and Vikas's mother; Rani's puppet and fake mother (Dead)

== Production ==
=== Casting ===
In June 2022, Nyra Banerjee was cast for the title role. Jiya Shankar finalized for a female protagonist.

=== Filming ===
The shooting of the series began in June 2022.

=== Release ===
On 19 June 2022, the first teaser featuring Nyra Banerjee as Pishachini released.
