= The Real Dream Girls =

- Theatrical release poster
- Directed by: Suresh Jain
- Screenplay by: Laljee Gorakhpuri
- Story by: Laljee Gorakhpuri
- Starring: Gulshan Rana; Tanveer Hashmi
- Cinematography: Gopal Dey
- Edited by: Kamal Saigal
- Music by: Shivam–Farhaan
- Production company: Om Siddhi Vinayak Creators
- Release date: 21 July 2006
- Running time: 123 minutes
- Country: India
- Language: Hindi

The Real Dream Girls is a 2006 Hindi B-grade romantic-drama film directed by Suresh Jain and produced under the banner of Om Siddhi Vinayak Creators. It features actors Gulshan Rana and Tanveer Hashmi in the lead roles. Shivam–Farhaan scored the music for the film. The film was re-released on 21 November 2014.

== Cast ==
- Gulshan Rana
- Tanveer Hashmi
- Karishma
- Dipti Verma
- Aktar Khan
- Alpana Upadhyay
- Ayaz Azmi
- Satyam Chohan

== Music ==
Shivam–Farhaan have given the soundtrack of the film. Lyrics have been written by Anjan Sagri. A track titled "Hum Kaun Hai Tumhare" have been sung by Shreya Ghoshal and Shaan. The other playback singers include notable Bollywood artists Poornima and Madhushree.
