= Mouli Ganguly =

Indian actress (born 1982)

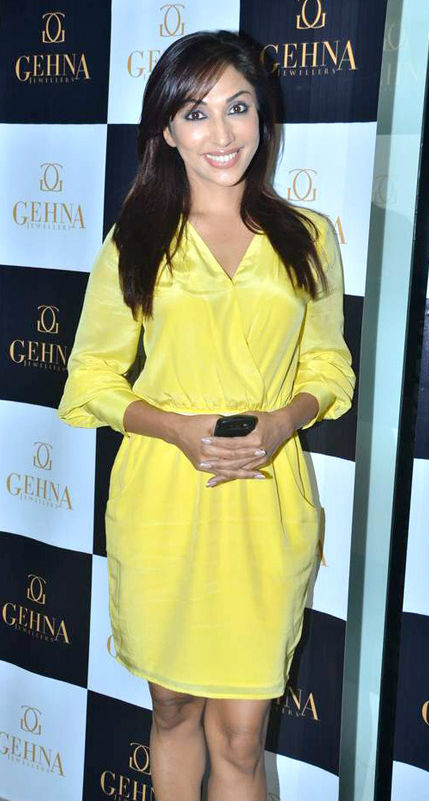
- Ganguly in May 2012
- Born: 15 December 1982 (age 43); Kolkata, West Bengal, India
- Occupations: Actor; Host; Model
- Known for: Kaahin Kissii Roz
- Spouse: Mazher Sayed (m. 2010)

Mouli Ganguly is an Indian actress, who has worked in both Hindi and Bengali cinema. She shot to fame as Shaina in Ekta Kapoor's thriller series Kaahin Kissii Roz that aired from 2001 to 2004 on Star Plus. She played the title role in Saaksshi (2004). She was also seen in Season 3 of Jamai Raja on Zee TV as Payal Walia. She was nominated in the Best Actor - Female category at the 2002 Indian Telly Awards. Currently, she is playing as Ira Sharma in Janani – AI Ki Kahani .

== Early life ==
Ganguly was born in Kolkata, West Bengal on 15 December 1982 and graduated in science from the University of Calcutta.

== Career ==
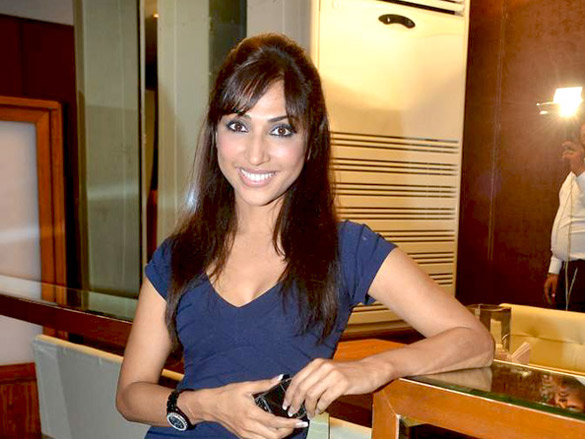
Ganguly in 2012

She started modelling and has been in a number of TV and print ads. She has modelled for products like Pears, Rin, Ponds Face Wash, Horlicks, Rasna, Ariel, Close-Up, Pepsodent, Asian Paints, Britannia, Maggie, Saffola and Bombay Dyeing.

She has also worked as an assistant director before she started acting.

In April 2001, Ganguly was cast in the lead role as Shaina in Kaahin Kissii Roz. The highly rated show garnered her a lot of positive reviews. The show went on until September 2004. She later starred in Kutumb and Kkusum. In 2004, Ganguly starred in the Sony TV serial Saaksshi in the lead role opposite Samir Soni and Amit Sadh.

Her television success led to an appearance in Rituporno Ghosh's film Raincoat (2004) alongside Aishwarya Rai and Ajay Devgan. Thereafter she took a hiatus and made a comeback with Aathvaan Vachan (2008).

In 2009, she appeared on the reality dance show Nach Baliye with her then boyfriend and co-star Mazher Sayed.

She played the role of the antagonist in the serial Kya Huaa Tera Vaada which aired on Sony TV in 2012 starring as a shrewd businesswoman who rekindles a romance with a married man. In 2016, she returned as an antagonist, this time in Season 3 of Zee TV's Jamai Raja.

== Personal life ==
Mouli married her longtime boyfriend, Kaahin Kissii Roz co-star Mazher Sayed, in 2010 in a private ceremony attended by close friends and family.

== Filmography ==
=== Films ===
Year	Title	Role	Language	Ref.
1996	Baksho Rahashya	Receptionist	Bengali	
1999	Shudhu Ekbar Bolo		Bengali	
2000	Bhalobasar Choan		Bengali	
2004	Raincoat	Sheila	Hindi	
2007	68 Pages	Mansi	Hindi	
2010	It's a Man's World	Unknown	Hindi	
2011	Chalo Paltai	Malini	Bengali	
2019	Kissebaaz	Inspector Madam	Hindi	

=== Television ===
Year	Title	Role	Notes	Ref.
2000	Thriller At 10	Shammi Narang	Episode 56–60	
2000	Milan			
2001	Karam	Manasi		
2001	Kudrat	Gayatri Chaudhary Seth		
2001–2004	Kaahin Kissii Roz	Sunaina "Shaina" Sikand / Mansi / Devika		
2002	C.I.D.	Dr. Amrita	Episodes "The Case of the Invisible Bullet Part I and II"	
2002	Krishna Arjun	Smriti / Malini;	Episodes 16-17	
2003	Kutumb	Shweta Chattopadhyay		
2004	Saaksshi	Saaksshi Singh		
2004	Sahib Biwi Gulam	Jaba		
2005	Kkusum	Vidhi Chopra / Vidhi Trishul Kapoor		
2005–2006	Sarkarr:Rishton Ki Ankahi Kahani	Kritika		
2006	Resham Dankh	Divya		
2008–2009	Aathvaan Vachan	Manali		
2008-2009	Nach Baliye 4	Contestant		
2010	Laagi Tujhse Lagan	Subalakshmi		
2010	Mano Ya Na Mano 2	Kamini	Episode 10	
2012	Aasman Se Aage	Roshni		
2012	Adaalat	Mouli		
2012–2013	Kya Huaa Tera Vaada	Anushka Sarkar / Amrita Shaurya Mitra / Anushka Balbir Bhalla		
2013	Ek Thhi Naayka	Tanushree Dheeraj Dasgupta		
2015	Suryaputra Karn	Radha		
2016–2017	Jamai Raja	Payal Walia		
2019	Shakti - Astitva Ke Ehsaas Ki	Shruti Nishant Bhalla		
2021–2022	Baal Shiv – Mahadev Ki Andekhi Gatha	Devi Anusuya		
2024	Janani – AI Ki Kahani	Ira Sharma		

== See also ==
- List of Indian television actresses
