= Siyaram Silk Mills =

Indian textile manufacturer

Siyaram Silk Mills Ltd.
- Trade name: Siyaram's
- Type: Public
- Traded as: NSE: SIYSIL; BSE: 503811
- Industry: Textile and garment manufacture, Fashion
- Founded: 1978; 48 years ago
- Founder: Dhara Prasad Poddar; Mahabir Prasad Poddar; Purushottamdas S.Mahasaria
- Headquarters: Mumbai, India
- Number of locations: 267 outlets (2026)
- Area served: India, Middle East, Sri Lanka
- Key people: Ramesh Poddar (Chairman & Managing Director); Pawan Poddar (Joint MD); Kishan Poddar (Executive Director); Gaurav Poddar (ED)
- Products: Fabrics(Polyester,Cotton,Wool, Viscose,Blends,Rayon, Poly Bamboo,Linen); Apparel; Home furnishings; Yarns
- Brands: Tessio; Mozzo; Inspiro; Oxemberg; J Hampstead; Unicode; Royale Linen; Den-kit; Mistair; Cadini; Cavalero; Canetti; Devo; Zecode
- Operating income: ▲₹1719.1 crores(9MFY26); ₹1485.4 crores(9MFY25)
- Number of employees: 650 (2013)

Siyaram Silk Mills Ltd, also known as Siyaram's or SSM, is an Indian blended fabric and garment manufacturing company, with an associated chain of retail outlets, and branded showrooms. Siyaram's was incorporated in 1978, and has its headquarters in the Kamala Mills compound, Lower Parel, Mumbai.

== Structure ==
Siyaram Silk Mills Ltd. (SSM) is a subsidiary of the Siyaram Poddar Group, the parent company of Balkrishna Industries Ltd. and Govind Rubber Ltd., which are all listed companies on the Bombay Stock Exchange. SSM is a small-cap company with a market capitalization of ₹936.75 crores. Siyaram manufactures and sells fabrics, ready-made men's and women's apparel, home furnishings, and yarns. SSM is associated with one lakh retail outlets, and has over 170 branded showrooms across the country. In the March 2014 quarter, the company's annual net profit was ₹20.2 crores. Siyaram produces over 4 million meters of fabric per month, totalling over 60 million meters annually.

== Product line ==
According to The Economic Times, polyester viscose, which is derived from crude oil, accounts for approximately 85% of Siyaram's raw material. In 2014, Siyaram reported 80% of its revenue came from fabric sales, 16% from garments, and 4% from yarn. Siyaram's weaving capacity is approximately 80 million meters and its garment production capacity is around 40 lakh pieces annually.

Like some other textile manufacturers, Siyaram's has produced the ready-made garment (RMG) sector. Starting in 2004, the company introduced product lines including home furnishings, uniforms, children's apparel, and women's clothing.

On 24 September 2015 Siyaram's Silk Mills announced a partnership with Italian brand Cadini at an event held at Sahara Star in Mumbai.
