= Childhood education =

Childhood education may refer to:

- Early childhood education, the education of children from infancy until around eight
- Primary education, the education of children up until around 16, including elementary and junior high schools
- Secondary education, the education of children up until around 18, including high schools
- Child care, the care and supervision of one or more children
