= Janani – AI Ki Kahani =

Indian television series

- Genre: Science drama Sitcom
- Screenplay by: Mrinal Jha
- Story by: Mrinal Jha; Dialogues; Rekha Modi
- Directed by: Abhigyan Jha
- Creative director: Preeti Bijlani
- Starring: Prapti Shukla; Mouli Ganguly
- Composers: lyricist Abhigyan Jha; Niranjan
- Country of origin: India
- Original language: Hindi
- No. of seasons: 1
- No. of episodes: 66

Production
- Producers: Mrina Jha; Abhigyan Jha
- Production location: Mumbai
- Animators: VFX; Ganesh Reshawat; Arpit Agarwal (Flying Todes Entertainment)
- Editors: Sujit Das; Shambhu Singh; Sanjeet Kumar
- Camera setup: Multi-camera
- Running time: 24 minutes
- Production company: MAJ Productions

Original release
- Network: Dangal TV
- Release: 15 April – 29 June 2024

Janani – AI Ki Kahani (transl. Mother (originator), Story of AI) is an Indian science fiction Drama television series, produced by MAJ Production, which aired from 15 April 2024 on Dangal. It stars Prapti Shukla, Mouli Ganguly and Nitin Guleria. It is the first Indian show based on AI and the fourth Hindi show based on robot. The show was went off-air on 29 June 2024 without an ending.

== Plot ==
The need to save her daughter's life from a fatal disease, forces Ira, a scientist-turned-mother, to invent an AI robot.

== Cast ==
=== Main ===
- Prapti Shukla as
  - Tara Sharma: Ira and Virat's daughter; Pranali and Mauli's cousin; Ritik's girlfriend
    - Kiara Bhanushali as Child Tara Sharma
  - Sitara: An AI robot
- Mouli Ganguly as Ira Sharma: Scientist and Employee at ISAR; Virat's wife; Tara's mother
- Nitin Guleria as Ritik Parmar: Paresh's son; Monish's cousin; Tara's boyfriend

=== Recurring ===
- Sumit Kaul as Paresh "PP" Parmar: Scientist and Director at ISAR; Naresh's brother; Ritik's father; Virat and Ira's rival
- Harsha Gupte as Mrs. Sharma: Virat, Yogesh and Roshan's mother; Pranali, Mauli, and Tara's grandmother
- Mazher Sayed as Virat Sharma: Scientist; Mrs. Sharma's eldest son; Yogesh and Roshan's brother; Ira's husband; Tara's father
- Ayesha Khan as Shalu Sharma: Yogesh's wife; Pranali and Mauli's mother
- Priyank Tatariya as Yogesh Sharma: Mrs. Sharma's second son; Virat and Roshan's brother; Shalu's husband; Pranali and Mauli's father
- Mitali Pandey as Pranali "Polly" Sharma: Shalu and Yogesh's elder daughter; Mauli's sister; Tara's cousin; Monish's fiancée
- Meghna Kukreja as Mauli Sharma: Shalu and Yogesh's younger daughter; Pranali's sister; Tara's cousin
- Ayush Viz as Roshan Sharma: Mrs. Sharma's youngest son; Virat and Yogesh's brother
- Aashika Bhatia as Chandini: Sitara in disguise as Ritik's ex-girlfriend
- Varun Jain as Monish Parmar: Maya and Naresh's son; Ritik's cousin; Pranali's fiancé
- Bindia Kalra as Maya Parmar: Naresh's wife; Monish's mother
- Parimal Bhattacharya as Naresh Parmar: Paresh's brother; Maya's husband; Monish's father
- Dhyey Mehta as Jeete: Pranali's ex-boyfriend
- Raman Sharma as Ishaan: Pranali's friend

== Production ==
=== Casting ===
The series was announced by MAJ Productions and was confirmed Dangal TV. The first promo was released March 2024 featuring Prapti Shukla and Mouli Ganguly. It was Launched on 15 April 2024. It replaced the television series Daalchini.

=== Cancellation ===
The Show Went off air Within three Months. The last episode aired on 29 June 2024. The show ran for 66 episodes.

== See also ==
- List of programmes broadcast by Dangal TV
