= Ruchika Girhotra case =

Girl molestation case of 1990

The Ruchika Girhotra case involves the molestation of 14-year-old Ruchika Girhotra in 1990 by the Inspector General of Police Shambu (S.P.S. Rathore) in Haryana, India. After she made a complaint, the victim, her family, and her friends were systematically harassed by the police, leading to her eventual suicide. On 22 December 2009, after 14 years, 40 adjournments, and more than 400 hearings, the court finally pronounced Rathore guilty under Section 354 IPC (molestation) and sentenced him to six months' imprisonment and a fine of Rs 1,000. The CBI had opposed Rathore's plea and had sought an enhancement of his sentence from six months to the maximum of two years after his conviction. Rejecting his appeal against his conviction by a Central Bureau of Investigation (CBI) special court, Chandigarh District Court on 25 May sentenced the disgraced former police official to one-and-a-half years of rigorous imprisonment, enhancing his earlier six-month sentence and immediately taken into custody and taken to the Burail prison. On 11 November 2010, the Supreme Court granted bail to S.P.S. Rathore on the condition that he remain in Chandigarh. Recently, the Supreme Court of India upheld Rathore's conviction in molestation case but restricted the punishment to six months' jail already served by him considering his age.

== Background ==
Ruchika Girhotra was a student in Class X A (Batch of 1991) at Sacred Heart School for Girls in Chandigarh. Her father, S.C Girhotra, was a manager with UCO Bank. Her mother died when she was ten years old. She had one brother, Ashu.

Ruchika, along with her friend Aradhna Prakash, were enrolled as trainees at the Haryana Lawn Tennis Association (HLTA).

Aradhna's parents Anand and Madhu Prakash attended over 400 hearings, after Ruchika's father and brother had to leave Panchkula due to harassment. Supreme Court lawyers Pankaj Bhardwaj and Meet Malhotra fought the case for free since 1996.

Born in 1941 and a 1966-Batch Indian Police Service officer of the Haryana Cadre, Rathore was on deputation to Bhakhra Beas Management Board as Director, Vigilance and Security, when he molested Ruchika. He was the founding president of the Haryana Lawn Tennis Association, and Rathore used the garage of his house at 469 Sector 6, Panchkula, as its office. The house used to have a clay tennis court behind it, built by encroaching on government land. A few young girls played in this court. Action by local authorities later led to the tennis court being reduced to a badminton court.

Rathore's wife Abha is an advocate. She defended his case from the beginning. She practices law in Panchkula and Chandigarh. Ajay Jain is another counsel for Rathore.

Rathore's daughter, Priyanjali, was Ruchika's classmate. She is now a practising lawyer. His son, Rahul, used to practice law at the Punjab and Haryana High Courts. He used to be an advocate with Cox & Kings in Mumbai.

Sub-Inspector Prem Dutt and Assistant Sub-Inspectors Sewa Singh and Jai Narayan of the Crime Investigation Agency (CIA) Staff Office in Mansa Devi tortured Ashu under the directions of Rathore.

Sewa Singh is currently the Assistant Station House Officer of Pinjore police station. He has not reported for work since the sentencing of Rathore created national headlines. He lives in Ratpur colony in Pinjore. Ajay Jain is also serving as his counsel.

== Molestation ==
Ruchika was a promising tennis player. On 11 August 1990, Rathore visited Ruchika's house and met her father S. C. Girhotra. As head of the Haryana Lawn Tennis Association, Rathore promised to get special training for Ruchika. He requested that Ruchika meet him the following day in connection with this.

On 12 August (Sunday), Ruchika, along with her friend Aradhana (Aradhana Prakash), went to play at the lawn tennis court and met Rathore in his office (in the garage of his house). On seeing both of them, Rathore asked Aradhana to call the tennis coach (Mr. Thomas) to his room. Aradhana left, and Rathore was alone with Ruchika. He immediately grabbed her hand and waist and pressed his body against hers. Ruchika tried to push him away, but he continued molesting her.

But Aradhana returned and witnessed what was going on. On seeing her, Rathore released Ruchika and fell back in his chair. He then asked Aradhana to go out of his room and personally bring the coach with her. When she refused, Rathore rebuked Aradhana loudly, asking her to bring the coach. He insisted that Ruchika stayed in his room, but she managed to run out.

Ruchika told Aradhana everything that happened. Both girls did not tell anybody at first. The next day, they did not go to play tennis. The following day, 14 August, they changed the time of practice to avoid Rathore, and played till 6:30 pm. However, as they were leaving, the ball picker, Patloo, told them Rathore had called them to his office. It was at this point that the girls decided to tell their parents about the incident.

Following this, Panchkula residents, mostly parents of tennis players, gathered at the residence of Anand Prakash, father of Ruchika's friend Aradhana, and decided that some strong action must be taken by way of bringing up the matter with higher authorities.

They could not contact either the Chief Minister Hukum Singh or Home Minister Sampat Singh, but met Home Secretary J K Duggal, who, on 17 August 1990, discussed the matter with the Home Minister and asked DGP Ram Rakshpal Singh to investigate.

Rathore allegedly paid some residents of Rajiv Colony (a slum) in Panchkula and also garnered the support of people from his community in Naraingarh, Ambala district. They staged dharnas outside the office and home of R R Singh.

On 3 September 1990, the inquiry report submitted by R R Singh to Home Secretary J K Duggal indicted Rathore. It recommended that an FIR be filed immediately against Rathore. Duggal forwarded the report to the Home Minister Sampat Singh, who failed to forward it to the Chief Minister for necessary action. The Home Secretary who replace Duggal never followed up on the report.

The report also revealed that an ex-MLA, Jagjeet Singh Tikka organised a large group of men to shout slogans in front of Ruchika's house and harass her family. Rathore enjoyed the patronage of both the Hukam Singh and the Om Prakash Chautala governments.

Instead of filing an FIR as recommended by the report, the government preferred departmental action, and, on 28 May 1991, issued a chargesheet against Rathore. However, the government's legal remembrancer, R. K. Nehru, suggested in 1992 that state government was not competent to issue the chargesheet, insisting that an FIR be registered. Then, the C M Bhajan Lal's office referred the case to the chief secretary for advice. Eventually, no action was taken.

Rathore was enjoying support from all the Chief Ministers and was using his influence and loop holes in the system to escape possible conviction.

== Harassment ==
On 20 September 1990, two weeks after the inquiry indicted Rathore, Ruchika was expelled from her school, Sacred Heart School for Girls, in Sector 26, Chandigarh. Ruchika had studied there from Class I.

The school actively plotted against Ruchika. The official reason for her expulsion was non-payment of fees. The school had actually refused to accept her fees. No notice was given to Ruchika for non-payment of fees, as is the school's normal procedure. The school's brochure states that non-payment of fees can only lead to being disallowed to take exams. It is not grounds for expulsion.

A magisterial inquiry has found that there were 135 similar cases of non-payment of fees at Sacred Hearts, but Ruchika was the only student ever expelled on these grounds. Of the 17 cases of late fees in 1990, at least 8 students paid their fees later than Ruchika did, but no action was taken against them. Ironically, the defaulters included Rathore's daughter Priyanjali.

The principal of the school, Sister Sebastina, who used to occupy the office then, accepted to the magisterial inquiry that she personally issued instructions for the removal of Ruchika's name from school register.

Ruchika's expulsion from school was later used by Rathore's lawyers to question her character.

It has been alleged that Ruchika was expelled to avoid embarrassing Rathore's daughter Priyanjali, who was her classmate.

The school tried to stall the magisterial inquiry into Ruchika's dismissal. Sister Sebastina only appeared before the inquiry after five days. The Chandigarh authorities threatened the school with legal action if they continued to stall the investigation.

After her expulsion, Ruchika confined herself indoors. Whenever she went out she was followed and abused by Rathore's henchmen. Rathore deployed policemen in plainclothes in front of Ruchika's house to keep an eye on the family.

False cases of theft, murder and civil defamation were filed against Ruchika's father and her 10-year-old brother Ashu. Five theft cases against Ashu were registered by Sub-Inspector Prem Dutt. The cases were filed when KP Singh was the Superintendent of Police, Ambala. Singh has been named in an FIR filed by Ashu. Singh later provided Rathore's advocates a statement absolving Rathore. Singh is now the Inspector General of Police (Training) in Haryana and works at the Chandigarh Head Office.

Cases were filed against Anand Parkash, his wife Madhu, and their minor daughter Aradhana.

Anand Parkash worked as chief engineer in the Haryana State Agriculture Marketing Board and had a spotless record until this incident. Rathore then instigated more than 20 complaints against him. He was suspended from his job for some time and demoted to superintendent engineer. He was eventually given premature retirement. He did, however, challenge the government orders and was given relief by the court and cleared of all the complaints.

Aradhana, who is the sole witness in the molestation case, had ten civil cases filed against her by Rathore. She received abusive and threatening calls for months until she got married and left for Australia. Pankaj Bhardwaj, the lawyer who took up Ruchika's case, was slapped with two court cases by Rathore -a defamation case and a case for compensation.

When Rathore was heading the vigilance team in the Haryana State Electricity Board (HSEB), he sent special teams from Bhiwani to raid houses of several of his complainants. Rathore also filed two cases against each of the journalists who had reported on the matter—one criminal and another civil—demanding compensation of Rs. 10 million each.

On 23 September 1993, Ruchika's then 13-year-old brother, Ashu, was picked up in the market place near his house by police in plain clothes. They drove him in a jeep to the Crime Investigation Agency (CIA) Staff Office in Mansa Devi. There, he was tortured by Sub-Inspector Prem Dutt and Assistant Sub-Inspectors Jai Narayan.

His hands were tied on his back and he was made to bend. His feet were tied with a weight. He was kept in this uncomfortable position for an extended period of time.

After some time, Rathore also arrived there. Ashu was then tortured further. A roller, referred to by the police as "Mussal', was rolled on his legs and thighs after four constables boarded the roller.

While still in illegal confinement, Ashu was taken to his house and beaten mercilessly in front of Ruchika by Rathore. Rathore then threatened her, saying that if she did not take back the complaint, her father, and then she herself, would face the same fate. Ashu was paraded in handcuffs in his neighbourhood.

Ashu was picked up again on 11 November 1993. He was tortured again and was unable to walk due to the beatings. He was not given food or water for days at a stretch and was beaten mercilessly. He was repeatedly told to convince his sister to withdraw her complaint. He was allegedly forced to sign on blank papers, which were used by the police to show his "confessions" that he stole 11 cars. He would not be released until after his sister's suicide.

No charges were ever framed in any of these cases filed against Ashu.

The Panchkula Chief Judicial Magistrate exonerated Ashu in 1997, saying he had "no hesitation to pinpoint that nothing is on record to prima facie indict the accused" and that the disclosure statement made by the main accused, Gajinder Singh, was "just wastepaper".

Gajinder Singh, a resident of Bihar, had been arrested by the Panchkula Police for a car theft and police claimed he had named Ashu as his accomplice. Singh later absconded and was named a proclaimed offender. He was arrested by a team of Haryana Police assisted by their Pune counterparts on 9 January 2010 from the Baner Road area, where he was running a dhaba.

The Girhotra's one-kanal bungalow in Sector 6 Panchkula was forcibly sold to a lawyer working for Rathore. Ruchika's father was suspended from his job as bank manager, on charges of alleged corruption, after coercion from Rathore. They moved to the outskirts of Simla, and had to take up earth filling to make a living.

== Suicide ==
On 28 December 1993, days after Ashu was paraded in handcuffs in his locality, Ruchika consumed poison. She died the next day. Rathore threw a party that night to celebrate.

Rathore refused to release Ruchika's body to her father Subash unless he signed blank sheets of paper. The blank papers were later used by the police to establish that the family had accepted Ruchika's forged autopsy report. Rathore also threatened to kill Ashu, who was still in illegal police custody. At this time, Ashu was allegedly unconscious in CIA lock-up. He had been stripped naked and beaten the previous night by drunk policemen. He was brought back to his house, still unconscious, after Ruchika's last rites were over.

The government closed the case filed against Rathore less than a week after her death.

Unable to bear the harassment, her family moved out of Chandigarh.

Just a few months later, Rathore was promoted to additional DGP in November 1994, when Bhajan Lal was the chief minister.

== Case dropped ==
In November 1994, Rathore was promoted. No action was taken on the inquiry report. Anand Parkash started trying to get copy of the report. After 3 years, he finally obtained it in 1997, and in November, moved the Punjab and Haryana High Court. On 21 August 1998, the High Court directed the CBI to conduct an inquiry.

In Oct 1999, the INLD government led by Om Prakash Chautala made Rathore the police chief (DGP) of the state. His name was even recommended for a President's Police Medal For Distinguished Service by the same government in November 1999. Birbal Das Dhalia, who as then Home Secretary, defended the decision, saying there was no chargesheet.

Shanta Kumar, who was then vice-president of the BJP, in 2000, wrote a letter to Om Prakash Chautala, urging him to take strict action against Rathore in the case.

However, instead of acting on the letter, Chautala complained to then Prime Minister Atal Bihari Vajpayee about it. Shanta Kumar was the Minister for Consumer Affairs in the NDA government at the time. Chautala's Indian National Lok Dal was an alliance partner.

== Ashu's Case ==
Ashu's case had reached before the HC following suo motu cognizance taken of a media report highlighting his plight, by justice Mehtab Singh Gill on 12 December 2000. The then chief justice had referred the matter before a division bench comprising justice N K Sodhi and justice N K Sood.

While deposing before the division bench, Ashu stated that he had undergone inhuman treatment at the instance of Rathore and the Panchkula police. This was his first statement since the family was forced to leave Panchkula. At the time of making the statement, the family was living in Sector-2, New Shimla.

On 13 December 2000, the division bench voiced support for compensation to Ashu for the harassment caused to him at the hands of Panchkula police.

Rathore filed an affidavit in 2001 denying the allegations.

The HC then referred the inquiry to sessions judge Patiala. On 3 September 2002, Ashu detailed the torture he was put through to a Patiala Sessions Court.

But Rathore approached the Supreme Court and got the high court order quashed on technical grounds.

== CBI Inquiry ==
On 21 August 1998, the Punjab and Haryana High Court directed the CBI to conduct an inquiry.

The High Court had ordered completion of investigation of the case and filing of chargesheet expeditiously, "preferably within six months". However, more than a year passed before the CBI filed a chargesheet.

On 16 November 2000, the CBI filed a charge sheet against Rathore.

Despite the CBI chargesheet, the Chautala government allowed Rathore to continue as police chief.

The case was put to hearing in the CBI special court in Ambala from 17 November. The hearings in Ambala would continue till May 2006.

The chargesheet was filed only under Section 354 (molestation). Abetment to suicide was inexplicably not included.

On 8 October 2001, counsel for Anand Parkash moved an application demanding the addition of abetment to suicide (306 of IPC) against Rathore. Rathore argued that Prakash had no standing to move the court.

However, in a scathing judgment on 23 October 2001, Special CBI Judge Jagdev Singh Dhanjal demanded that the offence be added. In his 21-page judgement, the CBI Judge underlined witness statements, including those of Ruchika's father, Anand Parkash, friend Aradhana and others in adding Section 306 (abetment) of IPC against Rathore. Dhanjal was forced to take premature retirement two years later.

However, in February 2002, Justice K. C. Kathuria of the Punjab and Haryana High Court dismissed the CBI court's decision to register an FIR against Rathore for abetment to suicide, claiming the lack of a complaint regarding harassment. Justice Kathuria was a neighbour of the Girhotras, with whom he was engaged in a property dispute.

In another glaring conflict of interest, he was also a close relative of O. P. Kathuria who is an associate of Rathore, had served as secretary of the Haryana Lawn Tennis Association which was floated by Rathore.

Justice Kathuria is now the President of the Haryana State Consumer Disputes Redressal Commission.

Incredibly, after filing the chargesheet in 2000, the CBI took 7 years to record evidence from 16 prosecution witnesses. On the other hand, the defence counsel took nine months to complete examination of 13 out of the total 17 witnesses.

Rathore tried to use his influence with the CBI. R M Singh, who was CBI Joint Director in 1998 and retired in 2001, said Rathore was tracking the case. Once the file arrived at Singh's desk, he started getting frequent visits to his office from Rathore. Rathore visited multiple times in 1998, trying to influence the CBI to clear him on all charges. Rathore had learnt that Singh was constructing a house in Gurgaon, and offered to provide building materials and other assistance. Singh also found out that Rathore had also approached the Investigating Officer for the case, Rajesh Ranjan, CBI's Deputy Superintendent of Police. When he failed to influence the officers, Rathore had the case transferred. Rathore enjoyed access to all levels of the CBI since he was DGP.

Ruchika's was one of the few cases heard in three subordinate courts of three different states: Haryana, Punjab and Chandigarh – apart from one in high court and the Supreme Court as well. Around 15 applications were accepted in Punjab and Haryana High Court on behalf of Rathore, a strategy meant to delay the case.

For example, on 23 January 2006, Rathore moved an application demanding transfer of trial from Ambala CBI Special Magistrate Ritu Garg to any other court. The application was moved when evidence of only two prosecution witnesses was remaining. The grounds claimed was that Rathore knew Ritu's father and that Rathore's son Rahul was friendly with Ritu. Surprisingly, the CBI didn't object. In his reply filed in February 2006, S S Lakra, the then Additional Superintendent of Police, New Delhi, said he did not object to the transfer, allegedly so the case would "conclude expeditiously". The case was then transferred to Patiala. Again when the case was at the last stage, Rathore accused the then Special CBI Judge of Patiala, Rakesh Kumar Gupta, of overawing the defence witnesses and scolding Rathore. This time also the CBI did not object to transferring the case to Chandigarh.

Rathore also used other technical grounds like demanding that the trial be videographed to cause more delays. Ironically, he later claimed that the long delays were grounds for a reduced sentence.

On 5 November 2009, the case was transferred from the Ambala court to CBI Chandigarh. In December, the court closed all final arguments, gave its verdict and on 21 December, special judge J.S. Sidhu pronounced a six-month jail sentence and a fine of Rs 1,000 to Rathore. The sentence was suspended until 20 January 2010.

He was granted bail minutes after the sentencing, after furnishing a bail bond of Rs. 10,000. Rathore's wife Abha has said they will be appealing the sentence on 4 January 2010.

== Impact ==
The case was brought up for debate in Parliament. "After 19 years, the criminal has been found guilty but all he got as punishment was 6 months in prison. Within 10 minutes of conviction, he was out on bail. Is it not a shame for all of us?" asked CPI (M) leader Brinda Karat.

Former Haryana C.M Om Prakash Chautala, when asked about the case, dismissed it as a "frivolous issue". It was during his rule that Rathore was promoted to DGP for Haryana. After the public outcry over the case, Chautala backtracked and accused the courts and the ruling Congress Government in Haryana of "letting Rathore off with a light punishment." Ruchika's father has blamed Chautala for actively supporting Rathore as he harassed his family.

Aradhna Parkash has started a signature drive to reopen the case.

However, the power of the law seems to be limited to grabbing hold of the DGP SPS Rathore, who will be stripped of his police medal. The decision to take back Rathore's police medal, given to the police officer for meritorious service in August 1985, was taken by a committee.

== Attack on Shambhu Pratap Singh Rathore ==
On 8 February 2010, a man, identified as Utsav Sharma, a resident of Varanasi, Uttar Pradesh, attacked Rathore with a pocket knife as Rathore walked out of the court. Rathore was rushed to a nearby hospital and the attacker was taken into custody. Television grabs show Sharma stepping up and stabbing Rathore in the face 2 times while missing a third stab before being over powered by the police. Television grabs also show a constable holding the weapon of attack with her bare hands with disregard for the sanctity of its use as evidence.

== Timeline ==
=== 1990 ===
- 12 August: IGP Rathore molests 14-year-old Ruchika in his office
- 16 August: Formal complaint submitted to CM Hukam Singh, Home Secretary
- 17 August: DGP asked to investigate
- 3 September: DGP finds Rathore prima facie guilty, submits report

=== 1991 ===
- 12 March: Home Minister Sampat Singh okays departmental action
- 13 March: CM gives consent to the proposal
- 22 March: OP Chautala becomes CM for 14
- 6 April: President's Rule imposed
- 28 May: Charge sheet against Rathore cleared
- 23 July: Bhajan Lal-led Congress government takes over

=== 1992 ===
- 6 April: First FIR against Ruchika's brother, lodged for car theft

Till Sept 1993, 11 cases of car theft lodged against Ashu.

=== 1993 ===
- 23 October: Ashu is kept in illegal detention for almost two months
- 28 December: Ruchika commits suicide by consuming poison
- 29 December: Ashu is released

=== 1994 ===
- April: Charges against Rathore dropped
- 4 November: Rathore promoted as Addl DGP

=== 1996 ===
- 11 May 1996: Bansi Lal becomes CM. Rathore promoted to DGP

=== 1998 ===
- 5 June: Rathore suspended by Bansi Lal govt in connection with parole of a detainee
- 21 August: HC orders CBI probe into Ruchika

=== 1999 ===
- 3 March: Rathore reinstated Additional DGP by Bansi Lal
- 23 July: Chautala becomes Chief Minister
- 30 September: Departmental inquiry exonerates Rathore
- 10 October: Rathore promoted to DGP

=== 2000–2010 ===
- 16 November 2000: CBI files charge sheet against Rathore in Ruchika molestation case
- 5 December 2000: Rathore removed as Haryana DGP. Sent on leave.
- March 2002: Rathore retires from service
- 21 December 2009: CBI special court convicts Rathore in the case. Sentenced to six months' imprisonment and fined Rs. 1,000.
- 25 May 2010: Sentence enhanced by 18 months.

=== 2016 ===
- Supreme Court upheld the conviction of former Haryana DGP S.P.S. Rathore in the Ruchika molestation case but reduced the 18-month jail term awarded to him to around six months already undergone by him in custody, keeping in view his advanced age as a "special case".

== See also ==
- Law of India
- Murder of Jessica Lal
- Rizwanur Rahman
- Priyadarshini Mattoo
- Nitish Katara murder case
