= Movers & Shakers (TV series) =

Television series

- Genre: Late-night talk show
- Opening theme: "Movers & Shakers" by Krishnakumar Kunnath
- Country of origin: India
- Original language: Hindi

Production
- Running time: 20 minutes

Original release
- Network: Sony Entertainment Television (1997–2001); SAB TV (2012)
- Release: 31 December 1997 – 22 June 2012

Movers & Shakers is an Indian late-night talk show hosted by Shekhar Suman that launched in 1997. The show aired on Sony Entertainment Television until June 2001. A revival season aired on Sony SAB from March till June 2012.

The show format included interviews, comedy routines, and performances with celebrity guests. The host also comically impersonated politicians of the time.

== List of episodes ==
=== Season 2 (2012) ===
Episode #	Date	Guests
Episode 1	12 March 2012	Govinda
Episode 2	13 March 2012	Sandeep Singh & Sardar Singh
Episode 3	14 March 2012	Bappi Lahiri
Episode 4	15 March 2012	Sonu Sood
Episode 5	16 March 2012	Terence Lewis
Episode 6	17 March 2012	Mika Singh
Episode 7	18 March 2012	Om Puri
Episode 8	21 March 2012	Tigmanshu Dhulia
Episode 9	22 March 2012	Nupur Mehra
Episode 10	23 March 2012	Shaan (singer)
Episode 11	26 March 2012	Sameera Reddy
Episode 12	27 March 2012	Prakash Jha
Episode 19	5 April 2012	Kader Khan
Episode 22	10 April 2012	Surendra Sharma
Episode 39	3 May 2012	Jay Soni & Ragini Khanna
Episode 40	4 May 2012	Giaa Manek
Episode 41	7 May 2012	Sudesh Bhonsle
Episode 63	5 June 2012	Sanaya Irani & Sakshi Tanwar
