= Tum Bin Jaaoon Kahaan =

Indian drama television series

- Genre: Thriller, Romance
- Directed by: Santosh Bhatt
- Starring: see below
- Opening theme: "Tum Bin Jaaoon Kahan" by Roop Kumar Rathod & Alka Yagnik
- Country of origin: India
- Original language: Hindi
- No. of seasons: 1
- No. of episodes: 289

Production
- Producers: Aruna Irani; Kuku Kohli
- Running time: Approx. 22 minutes
- Production company: AK Films

Original release
- Network: Zee TV
- Release: 12 October 2003 – 3 March 2005

Tum Bin Jaaoon Kahaan is a Hindi television serial that aired on Zee TV and starred Vikas Bhalla and Jividha Sharma in the main leads. It aired from 12 October 2003 to 3 March 2005.

== Plot ==
Muskaan lives in Delhi with her parents and younger sister. They go to Mumbai to visit relatives and Muskaan ends up staying there to go to Medical School. She meets Aryan and they fall in love. Aryan has a friend Monty, who does dark arts and knows how to talk to spirits. Aryan and Muskaan want to get married. Aryan has to attend to his ailing father and leaves. Due to a misunderstanding Muskaan agrees to marry someone else. On the day of her wedding Aryan convinces her to elope with him but on their way they meet with an accident. Aryan is injured but Muskaan loses her life.

A depressed Aryan convinces Monty to make him talk to Muskaan's spirit. The spirit tells him to move on but tells him that Muskaan will be reborn after 13 months in the town of Omkareshwar and throws yellow flowers on Aryan. Using the clue, Aryan finds a house in the town with yellow flowers. Though he doesn't find a newborn there, that very night after he leaves a couple visits the homeowners looking for a place where the woman can give birth. Thus, Khushi is born.

=== 3 years later ===
Khushi lives in Omkareshwar at her grandparents house with her mother and grandfather. Aryan falls into depression after Muskaan's demise. Aryan's parents get him engaged to Shweta. When a toddler Khushi finds out about Aryan's fiance Shweta, she kills her in a car accident. Aryan is shattered and starts to think that marriage is not for him. He spends all his time working in the hospital.

=== 3 years later ===
Three years later Aryan is still unable to forget Muskaan and blames himself for her death. Khushi's mother, Vrinda, shifts the family to Mumbai where they live with Vrinda's brother, Vishwanath and his wife. Vishwanath and Aryan's families know each other professionally.

Aryan's childhood friend Durga comes to Mumbai and helps him move on. Aryan eventually falls in love with her, and they decide to get married. Khushi tries to make use of her stronger senses to kill Durga. Noticing these mishaps, Sumitra takes advice from Guruma who advises her to ask Durga to keep herself away from Aryan for 40 days. This causes a rift in their marriage but they go for a vacation. Meanwhile, noticing Khushi's odd behaviour, her grandfather's friend Parikshit, takes her to Guruma and asks for help. Guruma realises Khushi has a power within her and wants it for herself but is unable to get it.

Failing to kill Durga, Khushi seeks help of Guruji. They talk about her past life but Parikshit overhears the conversation. As he is about to inform her grandfather, she makes him fall off a roof leading him to be completely paralyzed. He writes about her truth in a diary which is lost. Meanwhile, Durga decides to disobey Sumitra. On her way to reconcile with Aryan, she meets with an accident and is killed by Khushi. Aryan is devastated.

=== 3 years later ===
Khushi, now 8 years old, is very attached to Neelu and Shalini. Khushi has developed better senses, and is now able to predict what will happen the next moment. However, she now sees Aryan in a very blurry vision. She doesn't know why she keeps having nightmares. Khushi goes to Aryan's house for a party, and encounters Akash who is Devika's (Guruji's granddaughter) fiancé. Khushi sees him committing a murder but is unable to prevent it from happening.Akash realises Khushi's power and wants to kill her. Mysteriously, Durga reappears and she and Aryan discover she is pregnant.

Khushi is still confused about her visions of Muskaan. It is revealed that Akash, in fact, killed Muskaan because she left him on the day of their wedding. Akash is confined to a mental asylum. Looking for answers, Khushi goes back to the temple as Guruji looks on.

10 years later

Now 18, Khushi has been living in Australia with her parents but decides to go to India for an internship. Khushi visits her grandfather in Omkareshwar before heading to Mumbai. She joins an architectural firm where she hears about an upcoming project - the Kali Ma temple Khushi visited with Aryan. Khushi vaguely remembers the temple.

Meanwhile, Aryan and Durga are happily living with their daughter Shraddha. Khushi is sick of the games her mind keeps playing on her and one day, she goes back to the temple and asks God to reveal her purpose on earth. Khushi suddenly gets flashbacks of Aryan and her, and fully remembers her past. She then realizes that she is Muskaan who was brought back to earth to reunite with Aryan. Khushi catches Aryan when he is alone and tries to make him believe that she is Muskaan. Aryan gets a shock and does not trust her at first, until she talks about how they were about to get married, and met with an accident. Khushi is crazy about Aryan and refuses to leave him. Aryan explains to her that he has moved on in life and cannot leave Durga.

Eventually, everyone in the family finds out that Khushi is Muskaan. After being paralytic for years, Parikshit dies in the hospital. Khushi professes her love to Aryan and tells him that she will wait at the same temple as a bride to marry him but Aryan explains to Khushi that he cannot marry her as he loves Durga. This breaks Khushi’s heart.

Khushi falls into depression. At a park Khushi is bitten by a snake after which she is consumed by a negative force which turns her into a completely evil and heartless person. She vows to destroy Durga’s life. Durga eventually finds out that Khushi is Muskaan, and tries to keep her away from Aryan but in vain. Khushi creates misunderstandings between the couple and finally when Durga decides to go on holiday with Aryan and Shraddha, Khushi leads her to be involved in an accident where a man dies. Pretending to help Durga, Khushi helps cover up the incident but turns on Durga during the court hearing. Durga is sentenced to life imprisonment and the entire family is left in shock.

Khushi begs Aryan to marry her and divorce Durga. He gets compelled to break his relationship with Durga and marry Khushi. This shatters Durga. Aryan develops hatred for Khushi and tells her that he will never be able to love her the way he loves Durga. A heartbroken Durga meets Guruma in prison. Guruma helps Durga escape from prison using black magic and everyone believes Durga is dead. Aryan and Khushi consummate their marriage and Khushi believes that Aryan loves her once again.

Durga tries to expose Khushi and succeeds. Aryan and his family finally realize that Khushi was the mastermind behind Durga’s jail sentence and Aryan decides to sever all ties with Khushi. Aryan and Durga get back together. During the ceremony where they are remarrying, Khushi meets Aryan and tells him that she is pregnant with his child. Coincidentally, Durga also becomes pregnant the same time as Khushi. Khushi decides to kill Durga. She sets a car on fire, but ends up killing Aryan instead. Devastated, she vows to bring up Aryan’s child with pride and dignity when he is born. During both Durga and Khushi’s delivery, Guruma swaps the newborns.

The evil newborn is named Timir by Durga. As Timir transitions from a newborn to a little boy, he kills three people. Timir is under Guruma’s shadow. Meanwhile, Guruji’s men look for Timir because they know he is a demonic spirit disguised as a child. Maahir and Timir study in the same school and hate each other. Timir tries to torture Aryan’s mother when she finds out that he is evil spirited.

Shraddha’s doctor, Ritvik, tries to win over Durga’s heart and confesses his love to her. Khushi's friend Dhruv proposes to her. Ritvik and Dhruv tell Durga and Khushi to marry them respectively. Both women agree for the sake of their children’s happiness. Maahir warns Durga about Ritvik but she fails to understand his gestures. Ritvik turns out to be appointed by Guruma to assist in killing Durga. On their wedding day Durga exposes Ritvik, and he leaves. During an architectural project Dhruv discovers a mummy at the construction site, which turns out to be Timir! Timir kills Dhruv and dumps his dead body somewhere untraceable.

It is revealed that Aryan survived the car accident and was abducted by Guruma who kept him with her in a den for 7 years. She takes advantage of his memory loss by turning him against Durga and making it seem like Durga was the reason for the accident. A lost Aryan believes her, and starts plotting against Durga. Durga and Khushi discover Aryan is still alive. Meanwhile, Aryan is unable to bring himself to kill Durga. Affected by Maahir, he chooses to live with Khushi and Maahir breaking Durga's heart. Khushi remains unconvinced that Aryan loves her.

Guruma finds a dangerous convict who is Aryan's lookalike. She gets him to pretend being Aryan and live with Durga. The lookalike tries killing Durga but fails each time. He slowly starts getting attracted to Durga and sympathizes with her situation. On the day of Karva Chauth it is revealed that the man Durga was living with is not the actual Aryan. In an accident both Aryans are badly injured and one of them dies. At the hospital, the surviving 'Aryan' decides to keep Guruma in the dark.

During the final battle, Maahir and Timir vow to destroy each other. Just before Timir finally dies, Khushi and Durga realize that they had been under the wing of each other’s children. A few months pass. Guruma is now helpless, powerless, and completely disheveled from her endless battle.

Khushi requests Durga to let Maahir stay with her. Durga agrees, while Aryan, Durga and Shraddha reunite. As Aryan meets Khushi one last time, Maahir senses that Durga’s life is in danger. He tells Khushi to 'help him save his mother.' Khushi decides to do a good deed. A mentally ill Guruma attempts to put Durga in danger by causing an accident. Aryan tries to save Durga on his motorbike, while Khushi sits behind as a pillion rider. She recalls the first time they sat on the bike which was when they eloped. She smiles to herself and thinks how lucky she had been to be with Aryan. Aryan manages to save Durga and as the rocks tumble down, Khushi tries to save Aryan. In doing so, she gets buried under a heavy rock. Khushi dies in Aryan's arms as she whispers Tum Bin Jaoon Kahaan (Where do I go without you) under her breath and dies with the ending credits showing flashbacks of Muskaan reincarnating as Khushi.

== Cast ==
- Vikas Bhalla as
  - Dr. Aryan Rajsingh
  - Rudra
- Jividha Sharma as Muskaan Mathur
- Urvashi Dholakia as Shweta
- Neetha Shetty as Khushi Mehra / Khushi Aryan Rajsingh
- Rammohan Sharma as Guruji
- Sanober Kabir as Durga Aryan Rajsingh (Before Plastic Surgery)
- Sudha Chandran as Guruma
- Amrita Prakash as Neelima (Neelu) Mathur (Muskaan's Younger Sister)
- Pankit Thakker as Dhruv (Guruji's Grandson)
- Satyen Kappu as Virendra Diwan (Vrinda's Father)
- Anil Dhawan as Avinash Mathur (Muskaan's Father)
- Adi Irani as Harshvardhan Rajsingh (Aryan's Father)
- Utkarsha Naik as Mridula Harshvardhan Rajsingh (Aryan's Mother)
- Vineeta Thakur as Diya Rajsingh / Diya Vishal Diwan (Aryan's Younger Sister)
- Aruna Irani as Shalini Avinash Mathur (Muskaan's Mother)
- Puneet Sachdev as Monty
- Rakesh Paul as Advocate Akash
- Manoj Bidwai as Vishal Diwan
- Yusuf Hussain as Parikshit
- Dharmesh Vyas as Aditya Rajsingh
- Tiya Gandwani as Sumitra Aditya Rajsingh
- Dharam Taneja as Sumeet Mehra (Khushi's Father)
- Aliraza Namdar as Vishwanath Diwan
- Indira Krishnan as Vrinda Diwan / Vrinda Sumeet Mehra (Khushi's Mother)
- Manisha Kanojia as Revati Vishwanath Diwan
- Seema Shetty as Dr. Durga Aryan Rajsingh (After Plastic Surgery)
- Dinesh Kaushik as Sumitra & Durga's Father
- Ajay Trehan as Prabhat Mukherjee
- Prithvi Zutshi as Public Prosecutor
- Ruhana Khanna as Baby Khushi Mehra
- Lavina Tandon as Child Khushi Mehra
- Abir Goswami as Advocate Akash
- Smita Malhotra as Neelima (Neelu) Mathur (Muskaan's Younger Sister)
- Rohit Bakshi as Sahil
- Vineet Raina as Dhruv (Guruji's Grandson)
- Itishree Singh as Devika (Guruji's Granddaughter)
- Prithvi as Dr. Vikram
- Jayshree Rao as Vidhi Jindal
- Karishma Mehta as Nisha Diwan
- Sanjay Mitra as Sandeep (Sandy) Verma
- Ashlesha Sawant as Shipra Jindal / Shipra Sandeep Verma
- Ranjeev Verma as Surendra Jindal
- Niyati Joshi as Iravati Mathur / Iravati Surendra Jindal
- Aashka Goradia as Annu
- Shilpa Shinde as Diya Rajsingh
- Aruna Sangal as Pammi Rajsingh
- Mukesh Rawal as Ramakant
- Shweta Rastogi as Aditi
- Shweta Gautam as Madhu
- Rupa Divetia as Mother Superior
- Cindrella D' Cruz as Sunidhi
- Daljeet Soundh as Mrs. Diwan (Vrinda's Mother)
