= List of accolades received by Omkara (2006 film) =

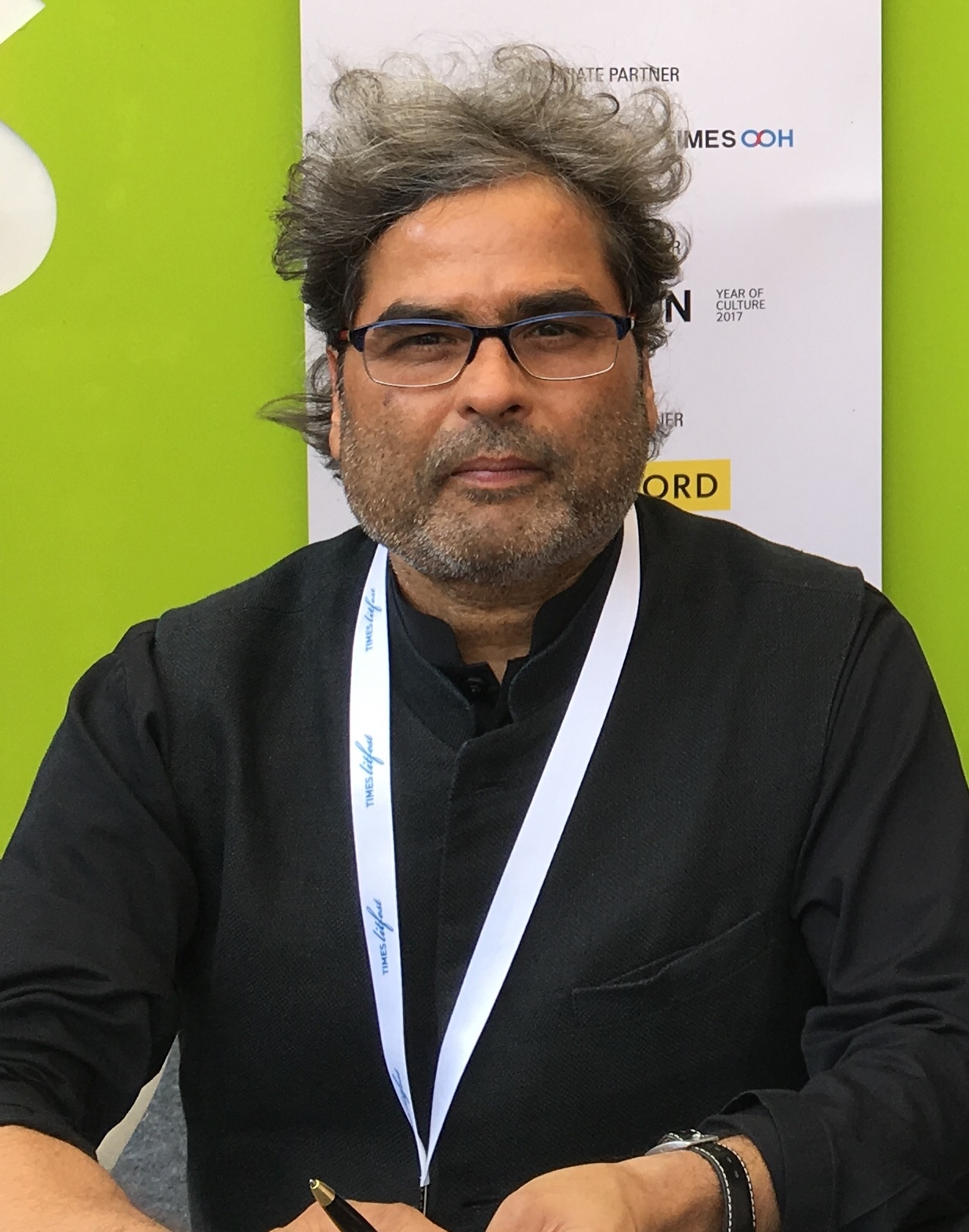
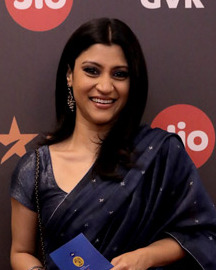
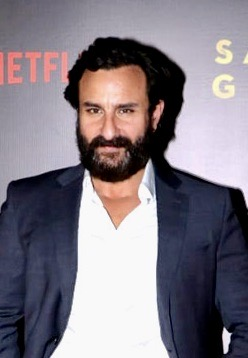
- Vishal Bhardwaj's direction and music, and Konkana Sen Sharma and Saif Ali Khan's performances in Omkara garnered them several awards and nominations respectively.
Accolades
Award	Wins	Nominations
Asian Festival of First Films	1	1
Bollywood Movie Awards	2	14
Cairo International Film Festival	1	1
Filmfare Awards	9	19
Global Indian Film Awards	3	13
International Indian Film Academy Awards	4	13
Kara Film Festival	3	3
National Film Awards	3	3
Screen Awards	5	18
Stardust Awards	5	10
Zee Cine Awards	5	11

Totals (Note: Certain award groups do not simply award one winner. They acknowledge several different recipients, have runners-up, and have third place. Since this is a specific recognition and is different from losing an award, runner-up mentions are considered wins in this award tally. For simplification and to avoid errors, each award in this list has been presumed to have had a prior nomination.)
- Wins: 41
- Nominations: 106

Omkara is a 2006 Indian crime drama film adapted from Shakespeare's Othello, co-written and directed by Vishal Bhardwaj. It starred an ensemble cast of Ajay Devgn, Kareena Kapoor, Saif Ali Khan, Konkona Sen Sharma, Vivek Oberoi and Bipasha Basu. The director Vishal Bhardwaj himself composed the entire music for the film, including the background score, with lyrics by Gulzar. The film is set in Meerut, a city in Western Uttar Pradesh.

Produced on a budget of ₹260 million, Omkara was released on 28 July 2006 and grossed ₹424.12 million worldwide. The film was cited as "10 Must-Watch Indian Titles" by The National. The film garnered awards and nominations in several categories, with particular praise for its direction, music, screenplay, cinematography, and the performances of the ensemble cast, with particular praise for Khan's performance. The film won 41 awards from 106 nominations.

At the 54th National Film Awards, Omkara won awards in three categories, Best Supporting Actress (Konkona Sen Sharma), Best Audiography (Shajith Koyeri, Subhash Sahoo and K. J. Singh) and Special Jury Award (Vishal Bhardwaj). At the 52nd Filmfare Awards, it received nineteen nominations and won nine, including those for Best Actress (Critics), Best Supporting Actress, Best Performance in a Negative Role, Best Production Design, Best Costume Design, Best Sound Design, Best Female Playback Singer and Best Choreography. At the 8th IIFA Awards, it received thirteen nominations and won four, including those for Best Performance in a Negative Role, Best Female Playback Singer, Best Choreography and Special Award for Best Adaptation. Among other wins, the film received two Bollywood Movie Awards, three Global Indian Film Awards, five Screen Awards, five Stardust Awards and five Zee Cine Awards.

At 30th Cairo International Film Festival, Vishal Bhardwaj received "Best Artistic Contribution in Cinema of a Director" award, at 6th Kara Film Festival, it won awards in three categories, Best Adapted Screenplay, Best Actor and Best Music and at 2nd Asian Festival of First Films, Tassaduq Hussain received Best Cinematography Award.

== Awards and nominations ==
Award (Note: Awards, festivals and organizations are in Alphabetical order.)	Date of ceremony (Note: Date is linked to the article about the awards held that year, wherever possible.)	Category	Recipient(s)	Result	Ref.
Asian Festival of First Films	29 November – 7 December, 2006	Best Cinematography	Tassaduq Hussain	Won	
Bollywood Movie Awards	26 May 2007	Best Film	Kumar Mangat	Nominated	
Bollywood Movie Awards	26 May 2007	Best Director	Vishal Bhardwaj	Nominated	
Bollywood Movie Awards	26 May 2007	Best Dialogue	Vishal Bhardwaj	Nominated	
Bollywood Movie Awards	26 May 2007	Best Actor	Ajay Devgn	Nominated	
Bollywood Movie Awards	26 May 2007	Best Actress	Kareena Kapoor	Nominated	
Bollywood Movie Awards	26 May 2007	Best Supporting Actor	Vivek Oberoi	Won	
Bollywood Movie Awards	26 May 2007	Best Supporting Actress	Konkona Sen Sharma	Nominated	
Bollywood Movie Awards	26 May 2007	Best Villain	Saif Ali Khan	Won	
Bollywood Movie Awards	26 May 2007	Best Music Director	Vishal Bhardwaj	Nominated	
Bollywood Movie Awards	26 May 2007	Best Lyricist	Gulzar for "Beedi"	Nominated	
Bollywood Movie Awards	26 May 2007	Best Male Playback Singer	Sukhwinder Singh for "Omkara"	Nominated	
Bollywood Movie Awards	26 May 2007	Best Female Playback Singer	Rekha Bhardwaj for "Namak"	Nominated	
Bollywood Movie Awards	26 May 2007	Best Female Playback Singer	Sunidhi Chauhan for "Beedi"	Nominated	
Bollywood Movie Awards	26 May 2007	Best Choreography	Ganesh Acharya for "Beedi"	Nominated	
Cairo International Film Festival	28 November – 8 December, 2006	Best Artistic Contribution in Cinema of a Director	Vishal Bhardwaj	Won	
Filmfare Awards	17 February 2007	Best Director	Vishal Bhardwaj	Nominated	
Filmfare Awards	17 February 2007	Best Background Score	Vishal Bhardwaj	Nominated	
Filmfare Awards	17 February 2007	Best Dialogue	Vishal Bhardwaj	Nominated	
Filmfare Awards	17 February 2007	Best Cinematography	Tassaduq Hussain	Nominated	
Filmfare Awards	17 February 2007	Best Production Design	Samir Chanda	Won	
Filmfare Awards	17 February 2007	Best Costume Design	Dolly Ahluwalia	Won	
Filmfare Awards	17 February 2007	Best Action	Jai Singh	Nominated	
Filmfare Awards	17 February 2007	Best Performance in a Negative Role	Saif Ali Khan	Won	
Filmfare Awards	17 February 2007	Best Actress	Kareena Kapoor Khan	Nominated	
Filmfare Awards	17 February 2007	Best Actress (Critics)	Kareena Kapoor Khan	Won	
Filmfare Awards	17 February 2007	Best Supporting Actress	Konkona Sen Sharma	Won	
Filmfare Awards	17 February 2007	Special Jury Recognition	Deepak Dobriyal	Won	
Filmfare Awards	17 February 2007	Best Lyricist	Gulzar for "Beedi"	Nominated	
Filmfare Awards	17 February 2007	Best Female Playback Singer	Sunidhi Chauhan for "Beedi"	Won	
Filmfare Awards	17 February 2007	Best Choreography	Ganesh Acharya for "Beedi"	Won	
Filmfare Awards	17 February 2007	Best Editing	Meghna Manchanda	Nominated	
Filmfare Awards	17 February 2007	Best Sound Design	Shajith Koyeri, K.J. Singh and Subash Sahu	Won	
Global Indian Film Awards	7–9 December, 2006	Best Film	Kumar Mangat	Nominated	
Global Indian Film Awards	7–9 December, 2006	Best Director	Vishal Bhardwaj	Nominated	
Global Indian Film Awards	7–9 December, 2006	Best Cinematography	Tassaduq Hussain	Won	
Global Indian Film Awards	7–9 December, 2006	Best Actor	Ajay Devgn	Nominated	
Global Indian Film Awards	7–9 December, 2006	Best Actress	Kareena Kapoor	Nominated	
Global Indian Film Awards	7–9 December, 2006	Best Supporting Actress	Bipasha Basu	Nominated	
Global Indian Film Awards	7–9 December, 2006	Best Villain	Saif Ali khan	Won	
Global Indian Film Awards	7–9 December, 2006	Best Music Director	Vishal Bhardwaj	Nominated	
Global Indian Film Awards	7–9 December, 2006	Best Lyrics	Gulzar for "Omkara"	Nominated	
Global Indian Film Awards	7–9 December, 2006	Best Lyrics	Gulzar for "O Saathi Re"	Nominated	
Global Indian Film Awards	7–9 December, 2006	Best Male Playback Singer	Sukhwinder Singh for "Omkara"	Nominated	
Global Indian Film Awards	7–9 December, 2006	Best Female Playback Singer	Shreya Goshal for "O Saathi Re"	Nominated	
Global Indian Film Awards	7–9 December, 2006	Best Female Playback Singer	Sunidhi Chauhan for "Beedi"	Nominated	
Global Indian Film Awards	7–9 December, 2006	Best Choreography	Ganesh Acharya for "Beedi"	Won	
International Indian Film Academy Awards	7–9 June, 2007	Best Director	Vishal Bhardwaj	Nominated	
International Indian Film Academy Awards	7–9 June, 2007	Best Story	Vishal Bhardwaj	Nominated	
International Indian Film Academy Awards	7–9 June, 2007	Best Dialogue	Vishal Bhardwaj	Nominated	
International Indian Film Academy Awards	7–9 June, 2007	Best Screenplay	Vishal Bhardwaj, Abhishek Chaubey and Robin Bhatt	Nominated	
International Indian Film Academy Awards	7–9 June, 2007	Best Actor	Ajay Devgn	Nominated	
International Indian Film Academy Awards	7–9 June, 2007	Best Actress	Kareena Kapoor	Nominated	
International Indian Film Academy Awards	7–9 June, 2007	Best Supporting Actress	Konkona Sen Sharma	Nominated	
International Indian Film Academy Awards	7–9 June, 2007	Best Performance in a Negative Role	Saif Ali Khan	Won	
International Indian Film Academy Awards	7–9 June, 2007	Best Music Director	Vishal Bhardwaj	Nominated	
International Indian Film Academy Awards	7–9 June, 2007	Best Lyricist	Gulzar for "Beedi"	Nominated	
International Indian Film Academy Awards	7–9 June, 2007	Best Female Playback Singer	Sunidhi Chauhan for "Beedi"	Won	
International Indian Film Academy Awards	7–9 June, 2007	Best Choreography	Ganesh Acharya for "Beedi"	Won	
International Indian Film Academy Awards	7–9 June, 2007	Special Award for Best Adaptation	Vishal Bhardwaj adapted from Shakespeare’s Othello	Won	
Kara Film Festival	7–17 December, 2006	Best Adapted Screenplay	Vishal Bhardwaj, Abhishek Chaubey and Robin Bhatt	Won	
Kara Film Festival	7–17 December, 2006	Best Actor	Saif Ali Khan	Won	
Kara Film Festival	7–17 December, 2006	Best Music	Vishal Bhardwaj	Won	
National Film Awards	2 September 2008	Best Supporting Actress	Konkona Sen Sharma	Won	
National Film Awards	2 September 2008	Best Audiography	Shajith Koyeri, Subhash Sahoo and K. J. Singh	Won	
National Film Awards	2 September 2008	Special Jury Award	Vishal Bhardwaj	Won	
Screen Awards	6 January 2007	Best Film	Kumar Mangat	Nominated	
Screen Awards	6 January 2007	Best Director	Vishal Bhardwaj	Nominated	
Screen Awards	6 January 2007	Best Dialogue	Vishal Bhardwaj	Nominated	
Screen Awards	6 January 2007	Best Music Director	Vishal Bhardwaj	Won	
Screen Awards	6 January 2007	Best Background Music	Vishal Bhardwaj	Nominated	
Screen Awards	6 January 2007	Best Cinematography	Tassaduq Hussain	Nominated	
Screen Awards	6 January 2007	Best Actor	Ajay Devgn	Nominated	
Screen Awards	6 January 2007	Best Actress	Kareena Kapoor	Won	
Screen Awards	6 January 2007	Best Supporting Actress	Konkona Sen Sharma	Nominated	
Screen Awards	6 January 2007	Best Actor in a Negative Role	Saif Ali Khan	Won	
Screen Awards	6 January 2007	Best Lyricist	Gulzar for "Beedi"	Won	
Screen Awards	6 January 2007	Best Male Playback Singer	Sukhwinder Singh for "Omkara"	Nominated	
Screen Awards	6 January 2007	Best Female Playback Singer	Rekha Bhardwaj for "Namak"	Nominated	
Screen Awards	6 January 2007	Best Female Playback Singer	Shreya Ghoshal for "O Saathi Re"	Nominated	
Screen Awards	6 January 2007	Best Female Playback Singer	Sunidhi Chauhan for "Beedi"	Won	
Screen Awards	6 January 2007	Best Choreography	Ganesh Acharya for "Beedi"	Nominated	
Screen Awards	6 January 2007	Best Sound Design	Shajith Koyeri, K.J. Singh and Subash Sahu	Nominated	
Screen Awards	6 January 2007	Best Art Direction	Samir Chanda	Nominated	
Stardust Awards	18 February 2007	Hottest Movie of the Year	Kumar Mangat	Won	
Stardust Awards	18 February 2007	Dream Director	Vishal Bhardwaj	Nominated	
Stardust Awards	18 February 2007	Editor's Choice Best Director	Vishal Bhardwaj	Won	
Stardust Awards	18 February 2007	Actor of the Year – Male	Saif Ali Khan	Nominated	
Stardust Awards	18 February 2007	Best Actor in a Negative Role	Saif Ali Khan	Won	
Stardust Awards	18 February 2007	Actor of the Year – Female	Kareena Kapoor	Nominated	
Stardust Awards	18 February 2007	Editor's Choice Best Performance of the Year	Kareena Kapoor	Won	
Stardust Awards	18 February 2007	Best Supporting Actress	Konkona Sen Sharma	Nominated	
Stardust Awards	18 February 2007	New Menace	Deepak Dobriyal	Nominated	
Stardust Awards	18 February 2007	New Musical Sensation – Female	Rekha Bhardwaj for "Namak"	Won	
Zee Cine Awards	1 April 2007	Best Film	Kumar Mangat	Nominated	
Zee Cine Awards	1 April 2007	Best Director	Vishal Bhardwaj	Nominated	
Zee Cine Awards	1 April 2007	Best Actor – Female	Kareena Kapoor	Nominated	
Zee Cine Awards	1 April 2007	Best Actor in a Supporting Role – Female	Konkona Sen Sharma	Won	
Zee Cine Awards	1 April 2007	Best Performance in a Negative Role	Saif Ali Khan	Won	
Zee Cine Awards	1 April 2007	Best Music Director	Vishal Bhardwaj	Nominated	
Zee Cine Awards	1 April 2007	Best Lyricist	Gulzar for "Beedi"	Nominated	
Zee Cine Awards	1 April 2007	Best Playback Singer – Female	Sunidhi Chauhan for "Beedi"	Nominated	
Zee Cine Awards	1 April 2007	Best Choreography	Ganesh Acharya for "Beedi"	Won	
Zee Cine Awards	1 April 2007	Best Track of the Year	"Beedi"	Won	
Zee Cine Awards	1 April 2007	Best Song Recording	Salman Afridi	Won	

== See also ==
- List of Bollywood films of 2006
