= Dwarak Warrier =

Indian Sound Designer and Sound Mixer

- Born: Hareendranath Dwarak Warrier; Thiruvananthapuram, Kerala, India
- Occupation: Sound engineer
- Years active: 2000 – present

Hareendranath Dwarak Warrier (Malayalam:ഹരീന്ദ്രനാഥ് ദ്വാരക് വാര്യർ ), better known as Dwarak Warrier is an Indian sound designer and sound mixer. He has worked in Hindi, Malayalam, and French cinemas.

== Biography ==
Dwarak Warrier, who hails from Thiruvananthapuram, is a 1992 graduate from Film and Television Institute of India, Pune. He is known for his association with director Ram Gopal Varma. He is currently working as Content Services Engineer at Dolby Laboratories.

== Filmography ==
=== Feature films ===
Year	Title	Director	Language	Notes	Credit
2012	Dabangg 2	Arbaaz Khan	Hindi		Sound Designer
2012	Ek Tha Tiger	Kabir Khan	Hindi		Sound Designer
2012	Agent Vinod	Sriram Raghavan	Hindi		Re-recording Mixer
2011	Not a Love Story	Ram Gopal Varma	Hindi		Sound Designer
2011	Delhi Belly	Abhinay Deo	Hindi		Sound Designer
2011	Stanley Ka Dabba	Amole Gupte	Hindi		Sound Designer
2010	Badmaash Company	Parmeeet Sethi	Hindi		Supervising Sound Editor
2010	Aladin	Sujoy Ghosh	Hindi		Sound Designer
2009	Agyaat	Ram Gopal Varma	Hindi		Sound Designer
2009	Luck	Soham Shah	Hindi		Sound Designer
2008	Jumbo	Kompin Kemgumnird	Hindi		Supervising Sound Editor
2008	Kidnap	Sanjay Gadhvi	Hindi		Sound Designer
2008	Love Story 2050	Harry Baweja	Hindi		Sound Designer
2008	Bhoothnath	Vivek Sharma	Hindi		Sound Effects Designer
2007	Dhan Dhana Dhan Goal	Vivek Agnihotri	Hindi		Sound Designer
2007	Unni	Murali Nair	Malayalam		Re-recording Mixer
2007	Johnny Gaddaar	Sriram Raghavan	Hindi		Sound Designer
2006	Baabul	Ravi Chopra	Hindi		Re-recording Mixer
2006	Dhoom 2	Sanjay Gadhvi	Hindi		Supervising Sound Editor
2006	Darna Zaroori Hai	Ram Gopal Varma, J.D Chakravarthy, Manish Gupta, Prawal Raman, Sajid Khan, Jijy Philip, Vivek Shah	Hindi		Sound Designer
2005	James	Rohit Jugraj	Hindi	Produced by Ram Gopal Varma	Sound Designer
2005	Kaal	Soham Shah	Hindi	Produced by Shah Rukh Khan	Sound Designer
2004	Naach	Ram Gopal Varma	Hindi		Sound Designer
2004	Dhoom	Sanjay Gadhvi	Hindi		Audiographer
2004	Gayab	Prawaal Raman	Hindi	Produced by Ram Gopal Varma	Sound Designer
2004	Ab Tak Chhappan	Shimit Amin	Hindi	Produced by Ram Gopal Varma	Sound Designer
2004	Ek Hasina Thi	Sriram Raghavan	Hindi		Supervising Sound Editor
2003	Jhankaar Beats	Sujoy Ghosh	Hindi		Sound Designer
2003	Bhoot	Ram Gopal Varma	Hindi		Sound Designer
2002	Company	Ram Gopal Varma	Hindi		Sound Designer
2001	Aśoka	Santosh Sivan	Hindi		Sound Effects Designer
2000	Jungle	Ram Gopal Varma	Hindi		Sound Designer
1999	Naukar Ki Kameez	Mani Kaul	Hindi		Audiographer

=== Short films ===
Year	Title	Director	Language	Notes	Credit
2013	Avec Mes Souvenirs	Vinayak Radhakrishnan	French		Sound Designer
2012	Death of a Tune	Vinayak Radhakrishnan	French		Sound Designer

=== Documentaries ===
Year	Title	Director	Topic	Credit
2009	One Crazy Ride	Gaurav Jani	Journey across Himalayas	Re-recording Mixer
2006	Riding Solo to the Top of the World	Gaurav Jani	Experience of a lonesome traveler	Re-recording Mixer
2006	The Return	Carl Parker	Riding Western China	Re-recording Mixer

== Awards ==
Filmfare Awards

- 2004 – Best Sound Design – Bhoot
- 2005 – Best Sound Design – Dhoom
- 2008 – Best Sound Design – Johnny Gaddaar

Screen Awards

- 2002 – Best Sound Design – Company
- 2004 – Best Sound Design – Bhoot

Zee Cine Awards

- 2004 – Best Audiography – Bhoot

Bollywood Movie Awards

- 2004 – Best Sound Design – Dhoom 2

Indian Documentary Producer's Association Awards

- 2006 – Best Sound Design – Riding Solo to the Top of the World

Sansui Viewer's Choice Movie Awards

- 2004 – Best Sound Design – Bhoot

Star Guild Awards

- 2004 – Best Sound Recording – Bhoot
