= Shaurya (disambiguation) =

Shaurya (transl. Valour) is a 2008 Indian film. Shaurya may also refer to:

- Shaurya (name), an Indian male given name
- Shaurya (missile), an Indian hypersonic surface-to-surface tactical missile
- Shaurya Chakra, an Indian military decoration
- Shaurya Smarak, a war memorial in Bhopal, India

== See also ==
- Shourya (disambiguation)
- Shaurya Aur Suhani, and Indian TV show
- Shaurya Aur Anokhi Ki Kahani, an Indian television drama series
