= K. J. Singh =

Kanwarjit Singh Sawhney
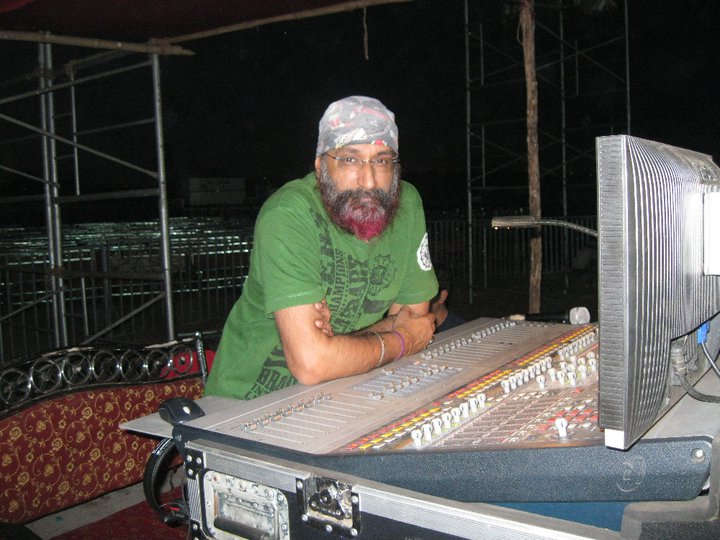
- Occupation: Sound Engineer/Music Producer
- Website: kjsingh.com

Kanwarjit Singh Sawhney, a.k.a. K.J. Singh is an Indian audio engineer/music producer based in Mumbai who won the 54th National Film Award for Best Audiography and Filmfare Award for Best Sound Design with Shajith Koyeri and Subash Sahu for his work on the 2006 film Omkara.

He studied at Springdales School and finished his master's degree in Political Science from Hindu College, Delhi. He put together a popular live band, Graffiti, in his college days. Went to Trebas Institute, Toronto, Canada to study Sound engineering and Music Production. He came back in 1987 to start his own music production company called Fast Forward Productions and composed jingles, title tracks, and songs. Most notably the tracks for India Quiz, Super Quiz, The India Show, Firdaus, Kauwa Chala Hans Ki Chaal, Manch Masala, Khula Manch, Style Today, Cooking with Tarla Dalal, Super Six, Doordarshan International News. Meanwhile, he helped cut demos for bands like Parikrama 'Till I'm No One Again, Euphoria Shibani Kashyap

He moved from Delhi to Mumbai, in 1997, starting is career in the Indian Film Industry with Maachis with composer/film director Vishal Bhardwaj and worked on all is films, namely Chachi 420, Betaabi, Jahan Tum Le Chalo, Satya, Daya, Godmother, Hu Tu Tu, Hum Dil De Chuke Sanam, Dil Pe Mat Le Yaar, Ramji Londonwaley, Love Ke Liye Kuch Bhi Karega, Paanch, Chupke Se, Makdee, Maqbool, till Omkara. He has worked with Shankar–Ehsaan–Loy Nadeem-Shravan Amit Trivedi - Udaan, Ik Tara from Wake up Sid, Sneha Khanwalkar and on many A. R. Rahman films, starting with Rang De Basanti, Guru, Ghajini, Delhi-6, Robot, Raavan, Jaane Tu... Ya Jaane Na, Jhootha Hi Sahi, Vinnaithaandi Varuvaayaa, Sakkarakatti, and Tamasha, and also been FOH Sound Engineer for many of his concerts. His clientele, for live engineer, boasts of names like Hariharan Colonial Cousins Jagjit Singh Kavita Seth Harris Jayaraj and G.V. Prakash, A. R. Rahman's nephew. KJ Singh also worked as music producer/sound engineer for the band Indian Ocean and for Rabbi Shergill.

His latest venture is 'Asli Music', an independent music label launched with the production of a spiritual album ‘ik On’kãr’ featuring Harshdeep Kaur. He has released artist/bands like Deepa Nair Rasiya, Spud In The Box, Jasleen Kaur Monga, Ronkini Gupta collective, Jaspreet 'Jazim' Sharma, Deva Sengupta, Chaar Yaar

He has produced music for installations like the Virasat-e-Khalsa, Phase II, Anandpur Sahib, Punjab, The Golden Temple, Sri Harmandir Sahib ji, Amritsar, Punjab, Shaurya Smarak, Bhopal, Madhya Pradesh.
