= One Crazy Ride =

- Directed by: Gaurav Jani
- Starring: Nicolitta Pereira; Vinod Panicker; Sanjeev Sharma; Gursaurabh Singh Toor; Gaurav Jani
- Edited by: Kishore Jadhav
- Music by: Ved Nair
- Production companies: Dirt Track Productions; 60KPH Club
- Release date: February 2009 (India)
- Running time: 87 minutes
- Country: India
- Languages: Hindi; English

One Crazy Ride is a 2009 Indian documentary film based on a 2002 route-charting expedition in India. It is directed by Gaurav Jani and produced by Dirt Track Productions. The film follows five biking enthusiasts (Nicolitta Pereira, Vinod Panicker, Sanjeev Sharma, Gursaurabh Singh Toor and director Gaurav Jani) as they journey across the Himalayas via an untried route. It was commercially released in Indian cinemas in February 2009.

== Cast ==
=== Riders ===
- Gaurav Jani: Formerly in the fashion industry, Gaurav quit his job to become a filmmaker. He founded a bikers club named 60KPH Club in India. In 2002, Gaurav, along with four other biking enthusiasts, organized a motorcycle expedition across the Himalayas to chart a route that was said to not exist.
- Nicolitta Pereira
- Vinod Panicker
- Sanjeev Sharma
- Gursaurabh Singh Toor

== Synopsis ==
Arunachal Pradesh (highlighted in red), one of the locations visited

Lesser known parts of India are explored as a five fellow bike riders from the 60KPH club set out on an expedition across the less travelled Indian north eastern state of Arunachal Pradesh to chart a route that supposedly does not exist. The bikers chronicle their attempt to travel from Tawang in west Arunachal to Dong in the east without entering the state of Assam.

== Background ==
Prior to One Crazy Ride, director Gaurav Jani embarked alone on an expedition across the Changthang region of Ladakh. Footages of the journey soon became his first documentary film, Riding Solo to the Top of the World. Following the success of the film, Jani decided to attempt a similar feat across Arunachal Pradesh.

== Production ==
It is claimed that there was no film crew or any chase vehicle. Footage of the expedition was entirely shot with director Jani's tripod. Filming locations include various parts of Arunachal Pradesh, such as Tawang and Dong.

The film features Dolby Digital audio.

== Accolades ==
- Certificate of Merit for Cinematography and Editing at IDPA Film Awards, India
- Jury Award at Flagstaff Mountain film Festival, USA
- Best Mountain Culture Film at Kendal Mountain Film Festival, UK
- Best Film at the International Motorcycle Film Festival
- Invited Entry at Asian Heritage Month Film Festival, Canada
- Invited Entry at Salt Spring Film Festival, Canada
- Invited Entry at Himalayan Film Festival, Netherlands
- Invited Entry at Mill Valley Film Festival, USA
- Invited Entry at 2010 Wisconsin Film Festival, USA
- Invited Entry at Kathmandu Mountain Film Festival, Nepal
- Invited Entry at Shaff Adventure film Festival, UK
- Invited Entry at CMS Vatavaran Nature and Wildlife Film Festival, India
- Invited Entry at Mumbai International Film Festival, India
- Invited Entry at Himalaya Film Festival, UK

== See also ==
- Riding Solo to the Top of the World
