= Shourya =

Shourya may refer to:

- Shourya (2010 film), an Indian Kannada-language action film
- Shourya (2016 film), an Indian Telugu-language romantic thriller film

== See also ==
- Shaurya (disambiguation)
