= Filmfare Award for Best Sound Design =

Annual award for Hindi films

The Filmfare Best Sound is given by India's Filmfare magazine as part of its annual Filmfare Awards for Hindi films.

Here is a list of some of the award winners and the films for which they won.

== List ==
Year	Winner	Film
2025	Subhash Sahoo	Kill
2024	Kunal Sharma (MPSE)	Sam Bahadur
2024	Sachin Sudhakaran & Hariharan Muralidharan (Sync Cinema)	Animal
2023	Bishwadeep Chatterjee	Brahmāstra: Part One – Shiva
2022	Dipankar Chaki and Nihar Ranjan Samal	Sardar Udham
2021	Kaamod Kharade	Thappad
2020	Bishwadeep Dipak Chatterjee, Nihar Ranjan Samal	Uri: The Surgical Strike
2019	Kunal Sharma	Tumbbad
2018	Anish John	Trapped
2017	Vivek Sachidananda	Phobia
2017	Ravi Soni	Neerja
2016	Shajith Koyeri	Talvar
2015	Anilkumar Konakandla and Prabal Pradhan	Mardaani
2014	Bishwadeep Chatterjee & Nihar Ranjan Samar	Madras Cafe
2013	Sanjay Maurya & Allwin Rego	Kahaani
2012	Nakul Kamte	Don 2
2011	Pritam Das; Kunal Sharma	Love Sex aur Dhokha; Udaan
2010	Manas Chaudhury	Firaaq
2009	Baylon Fonseca, Vinod Subramanian	Rock On!!
2008	Leslie Fernandes	Johnny Gaddaar
2007	Shajith Koyeri, Subash Sahu & K. J. Singh	Omkara
2006	Bishwadeep Chatterjee	Parineeta
2005	Dwarak Warrier	Dhoom
2004	Dwarak Warrior	Bhoot
2003	Arun Nambiar	Road
2002	Ranjit Ranjan	Aks
2001	Anuj Mathur	Mohabbatein
2000	Rakesh Ranjan	Taal
1999	H. Sridhar	Satya
1998	Vinod Potdar	Border
1997	Jitendra Chowdhary	Khamoshi: The Musical
1996	Rakesh Ranjan	Barsaat
1995	Jitendra Chaudhary and Namita Nayak	1942: A Love Story
1994	Rakesh Ranjan	Damini – Lightning
1993	Bhagat Singh Rathod and Kuldeep Sood	Khuda Gawah
1992	S.C. Bhambri	Pathar Ke Insan
1991	E. Rudra	Azaad Desh Ke Gulam
1990	B.V. Chaturvedi	Tridev
1989	J.P. Seghal	Hatya
1988	No Ceremony Held	No Ceremony Held
1987	No Ceremony Held	No Ceremony Held
1986	A. Radha Swamy	Shiva Ka Insaaf
1985	Brahmamand Sharma	Sohni Mahiwal
1984	Hitendra Ghosh	Vijeta
1983	P. Harikishan	Shakti
1982	Hitendra Ghosh	Kalyug
1981	P. Harikishan	Qurbani
1980	Hitendra Ghosh	Junoon
1979	Ranjit Biswas	Devata
1978	Dinshaw Billimoria	Agent Vinod
1977	P. Harikishan	Bairaag
1976	M.A. Shaikh	Deewaar
1975	L.H. Bhatia	Amir Garib
1974	Allauddin Khan Qureshi	Bobby
1973	Jehangir Nowroji	Amar Prem
1972	Allauddin Khan Qureshi	Mera Naam Joker
1971	S. C. Bhambri	Talash
1970	M.A. Shaikh	Ittefaq
1969	P. Thakkersey	Shikar
1968	J. M. Barot	Jewel Thief
1967	Manohar Amberkar	Mera Saaya
1966	Essa M. Suratwala	Yaadein
1965	Allauddin Khan Qureshi	Sangam
1964	Dinshaw Billimoria	Bandini
1963	S. Y. Pathak	Bees Saal Baad
1962	Kuldeep Singh	Junglee
1961	George D'Cruz	Parakh
1960	A. K. Parmar	Navrang
1959	Ishan Ghosh	Chandan
1958	R. Kaushik	Mother India
1957	A. K. Parmar	Jhanak Jhanak Payal Baaje
1956	R. Kaushik	Amar
1955	Ishan Ghosh	Jeewan Jyoti

== See also ==
- Filmfare Awards
- Bollywood
- Cinema of India
