= Tassaduq Hussain Mufti =

Indian politician

Member of Legislative Council
- In office 22 December 2017 – August 2019
- Constituency: Nominated Member

Minister For Tourism
- In office 2017–2018

Personal details
- Born: Mufti Tassaduq Sayeed; 1973 (age 52–53)
- Party: Jammu and Kashmir Peoples Democratic Party (PDP)
- Occupation: Cinematographer, Politician

Tassaduq Hussain Mufti is an Indian politician and a cinematographer known for his work in Omkara and Kaminey. He is now the member of Jammu and Kashmir Peoples Democratic Party and the former member of Jammu and Kashmir Legislative Council. He served as the Cabinet Minister for Tourism, from 2017 to 2018, in the government of Jammu and Kashmir. He is the son of former Home Minister of India and two time Chief Minister of Jammu and Kashmir, Mufti Mohammad Sayeed, and brother of former Chief Minister of Jammu and Kashmir, Mehbooba Mufti.
