= Unni (2007 film) =

- Directed by: Murali Nair
- Produced by: Jean Roke Patouden
- Starring: Ajith; Kumar K. Sarath
- Cinematography: Jean Mark Selva
- Edited by: Lathika Krishna
- Release date: 2007
- Language: Malayalam

Unni is a 2007 Malayalam-language Indian feature film directed by Murali Nair, starring Ajith, Kumar K. Sarath in lead roles.

== Cast ==
- Kumar K. Sarath as Unni
- V. N. Ajith as Gopi
- Bharathan Njarakkal
- Kodakara Sukumaran
- Leela Hari
- Likhil
- Noble
- Rajan Engakkad
- Sreedharan
- Vypin Lenin
