= Shaurya (name) =

Shaurya is a Hindi given name and surname. Notable people with the name include:

- Shaurya Chauhan (born 1977), Indian model, actress and TV host
- Shaurya Sanandia (born 1987), Indian cricketer
- Shelly Shaurya (born 1993), Indian cricketer
