= Shaurya Smarak =

War memorial in Bhopal, India

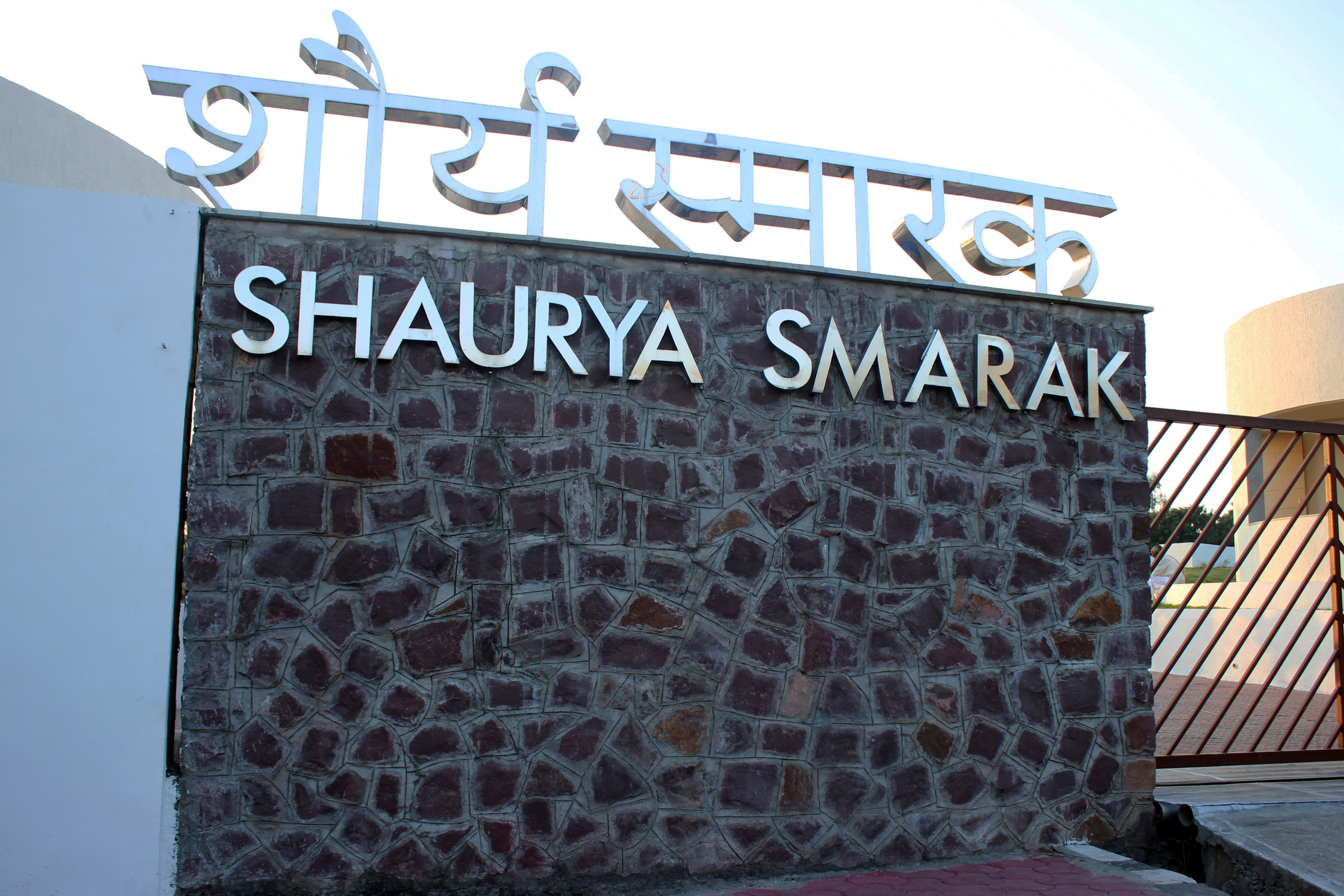
- Shaurya Smarak Entrance Gate
- Interactive map of the Shaurya Smarak area

General information
- Location: Bhopal, India
- Coordinates: 23.2316297°N 77.4281971°E
- Inaugurated: 14 October 2016

Dimensions
- Other dimensions: Area 12.67 acres (51,250 sq m) approx

Technical details
- Floor area: 8,000 sqm

Design and construction
- Architect: Shona Jain

Shaurya Smarak (Sanskrit : शौर्य स्मारक) is a war memorial situated at Bhopal, inaugurated by the Prime Minister of India Narendra Modi on 14 October 2016. Shaurya Smarak is established by the government of Madhya Pradesh at Bhopal in the heart area of Arera Hills near M.P. Nagar and Secretariat. It is sprawled over a large area of about 12 acres. It is developed as a public park with imaginative and interesting architectural installations depicting the sacrifice of the soldiers. In the park, there is a 62-feet high sculpture rising from the ground called Shaurya Stambh depicting the Indian Army, Navy, and Air Force. The Army is signified by Granite, The Navy in Grey, and the Air Force in White. Around the Shaurya Stambh names of the martyred soldiers have been inscribed on glass boards. Beside the Shaurya Stambh, there is Smarak Jyoti which is lit in holographic flame for the honor of the martyrs. Not only this there is a red sculpture kept in the park which when seen from the main axis it appears as a 'Namaskar' and when looked at from another axis it appears as 'A Drop of Blood'.It is the first war memorial of the country built in the memory of martyrs.

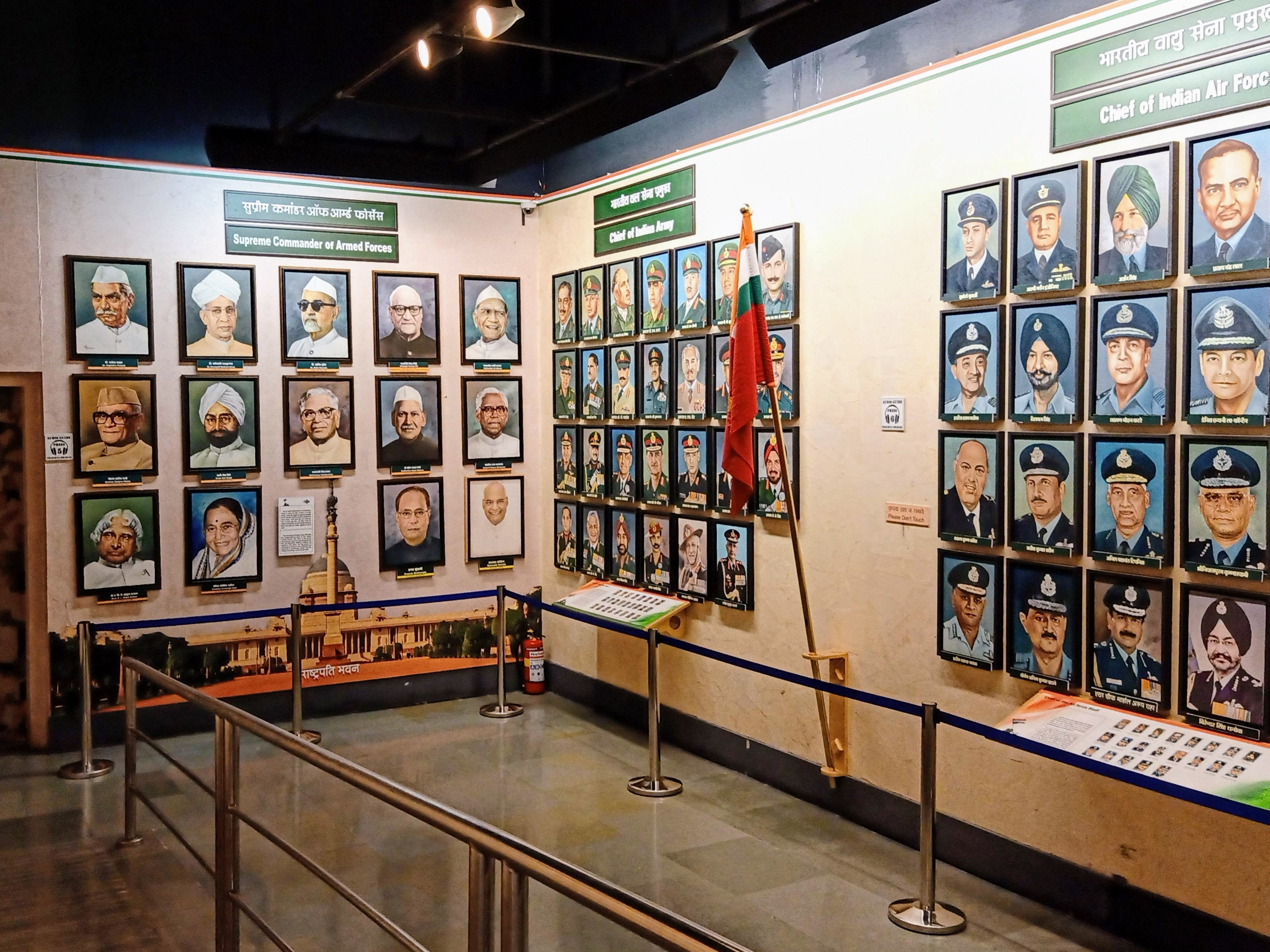
Photo gallery showing Supreme Commanders of the Armed forces along with the various Chiefs of the Indian Army and Air Force

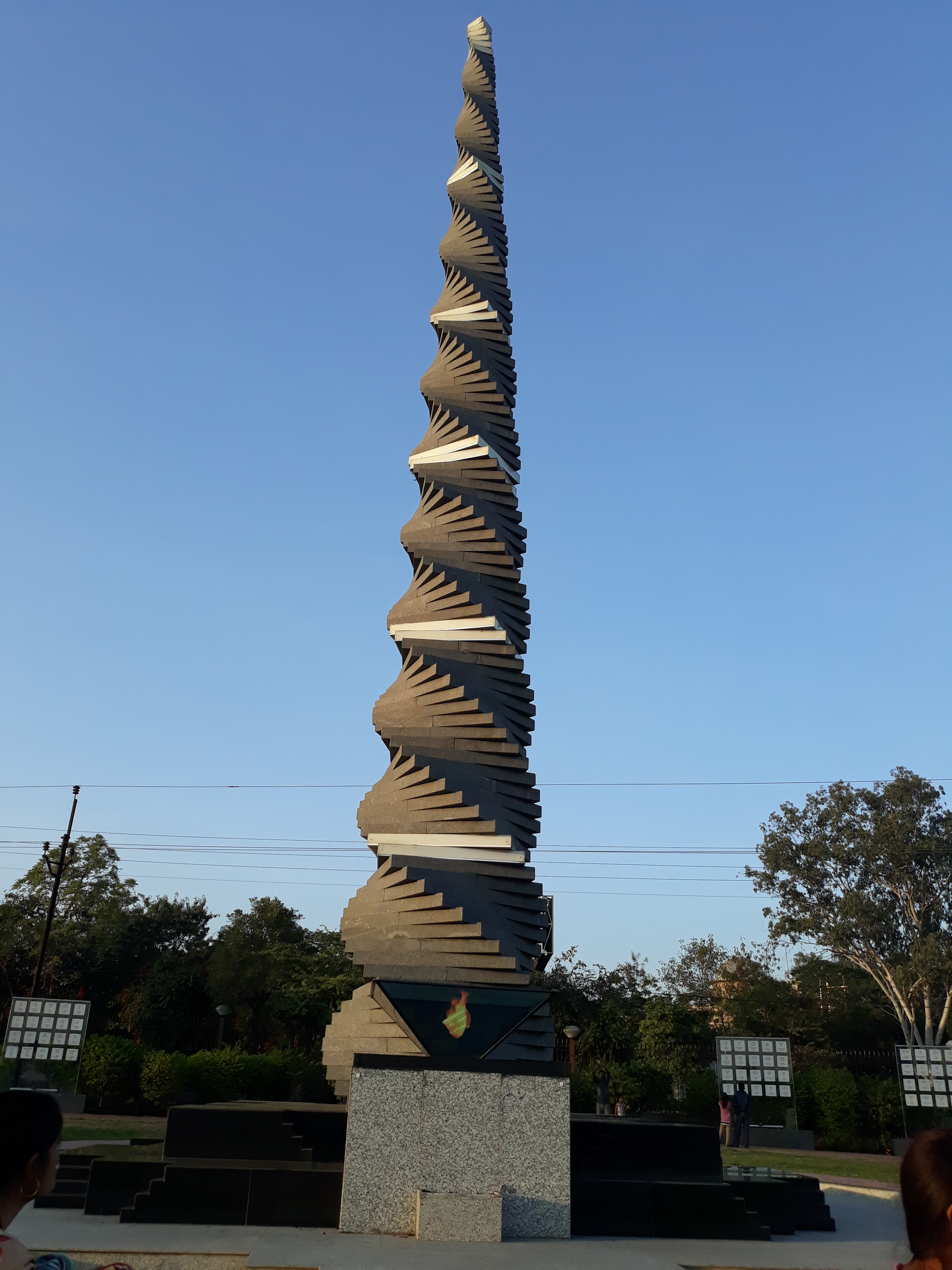
62-feet high sculpture

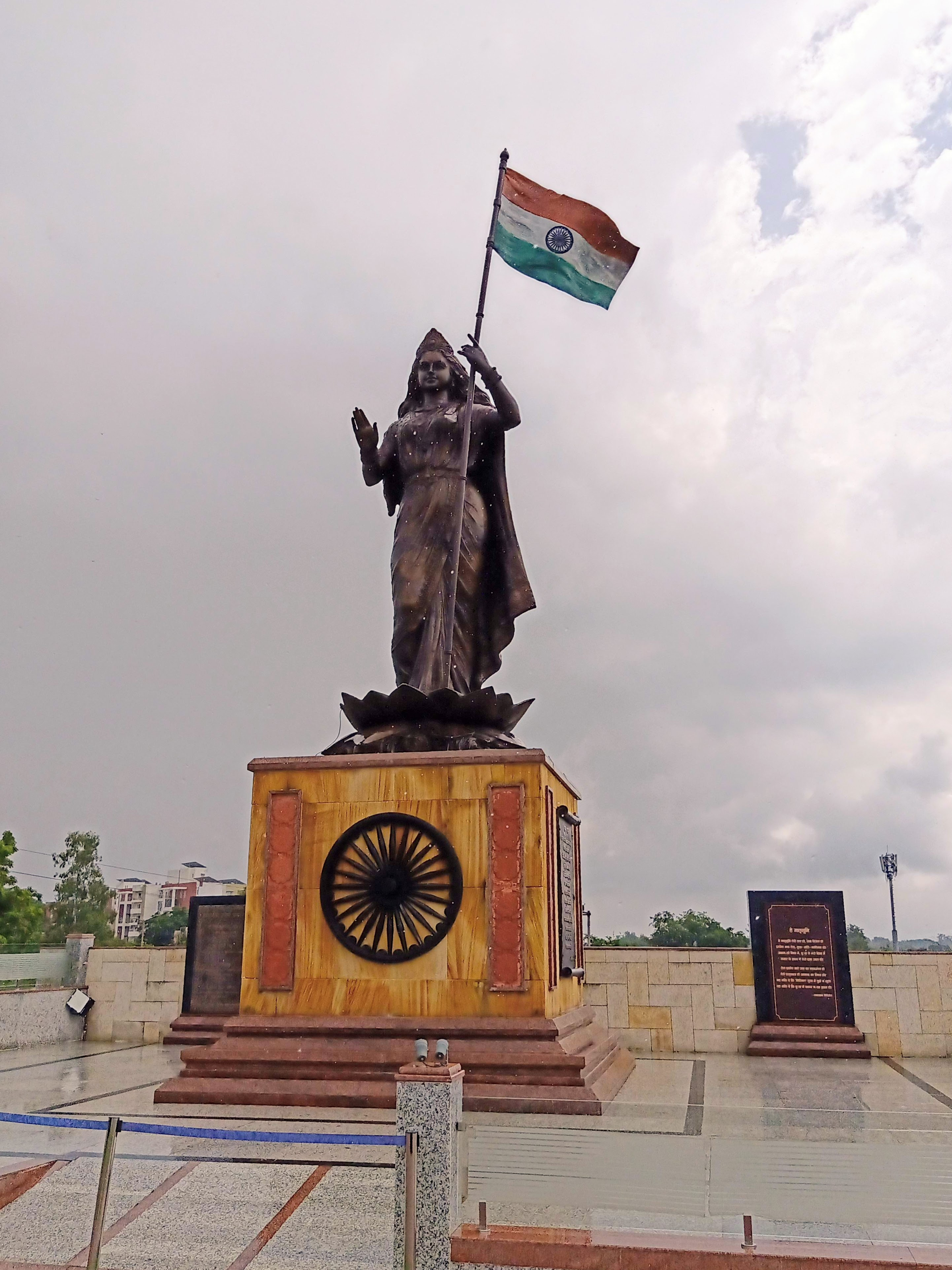
Bharat Mata statue in Shaurya Smarak Bhopal

If we move further in the park there is an underground museum having dedicated galleries and landmarks in the memory of war heroes who had shown their gallantry in the various wars with Pakistan and China. It also shows some historical heroes like Maharana Pratap and Tipu Sultan. The galleries portray the original handmade art pieces and portraits of war heroes and displays of different arms. Many displays show the various ranks and badges for different ranks of Army, Navy, and Air force. Some galleries are dedicated to winners of gallantry awards including the Paramvir Chakra and the Mahavir Chakra, withshort descriptions of their heroic acts. The models of various warships, submarines, aircraft are also shown as an educational supplement. On the outside periphery, various display boards show the proud list of martyrs of various wars of Madhya Pradesh origin along with the national heroes. The main attraction of the museum is a gallery that allows visitors to experience the cold of Siachen Glacier and understand the terrain of the Siachen war zones. Apart from this Shaurya Smarak has an amphitheater. On August 15, Indian independence day, Madhya Pradesh Chef Minister Shivraj Singh Chouhan unveiled a 37 feet high bronze statue of Bharat Mata

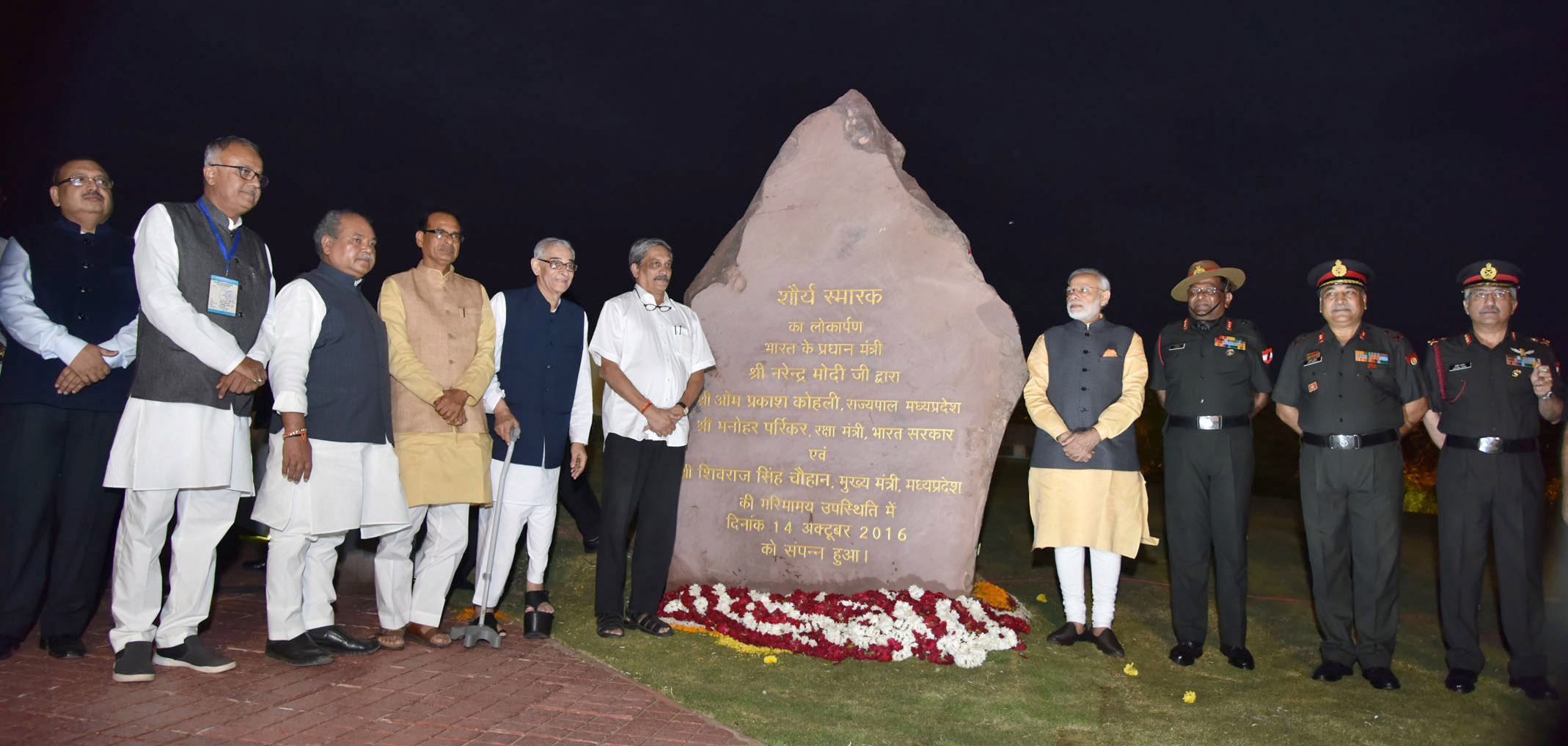
Prime Minister Narendra Modi dedicates the Shaurya Smarak to the nation

== Gallery ==
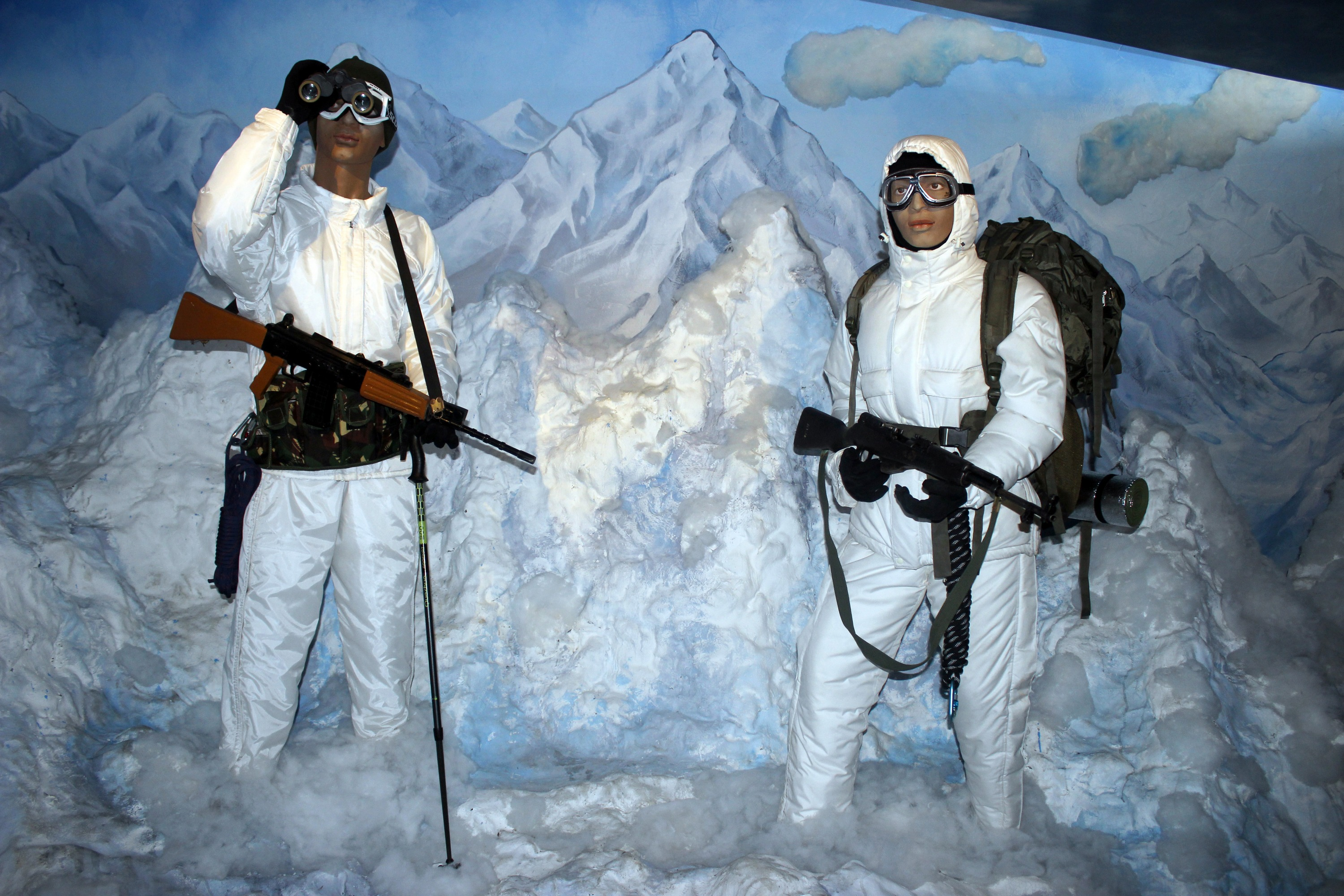
Cap

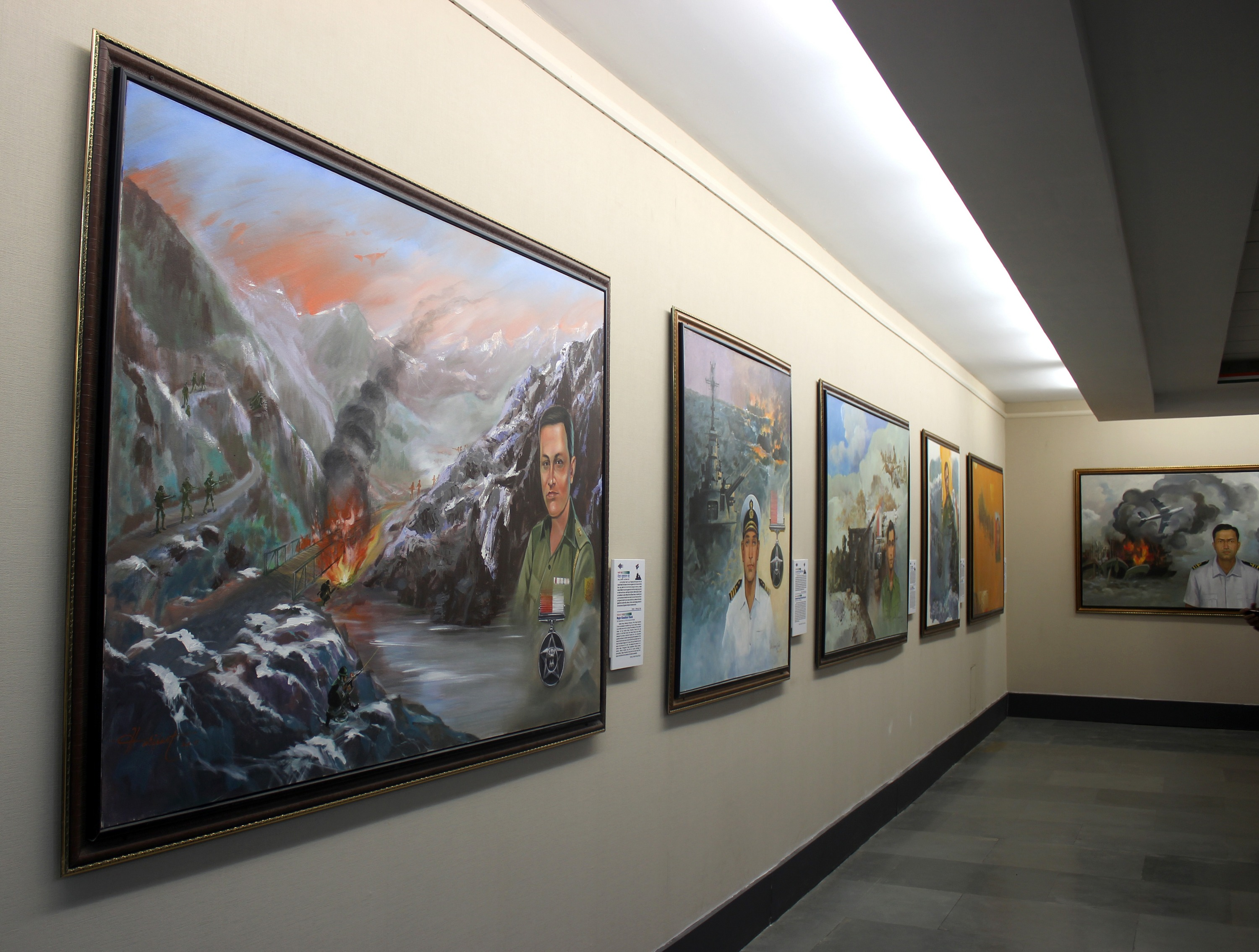
Photo Gallery

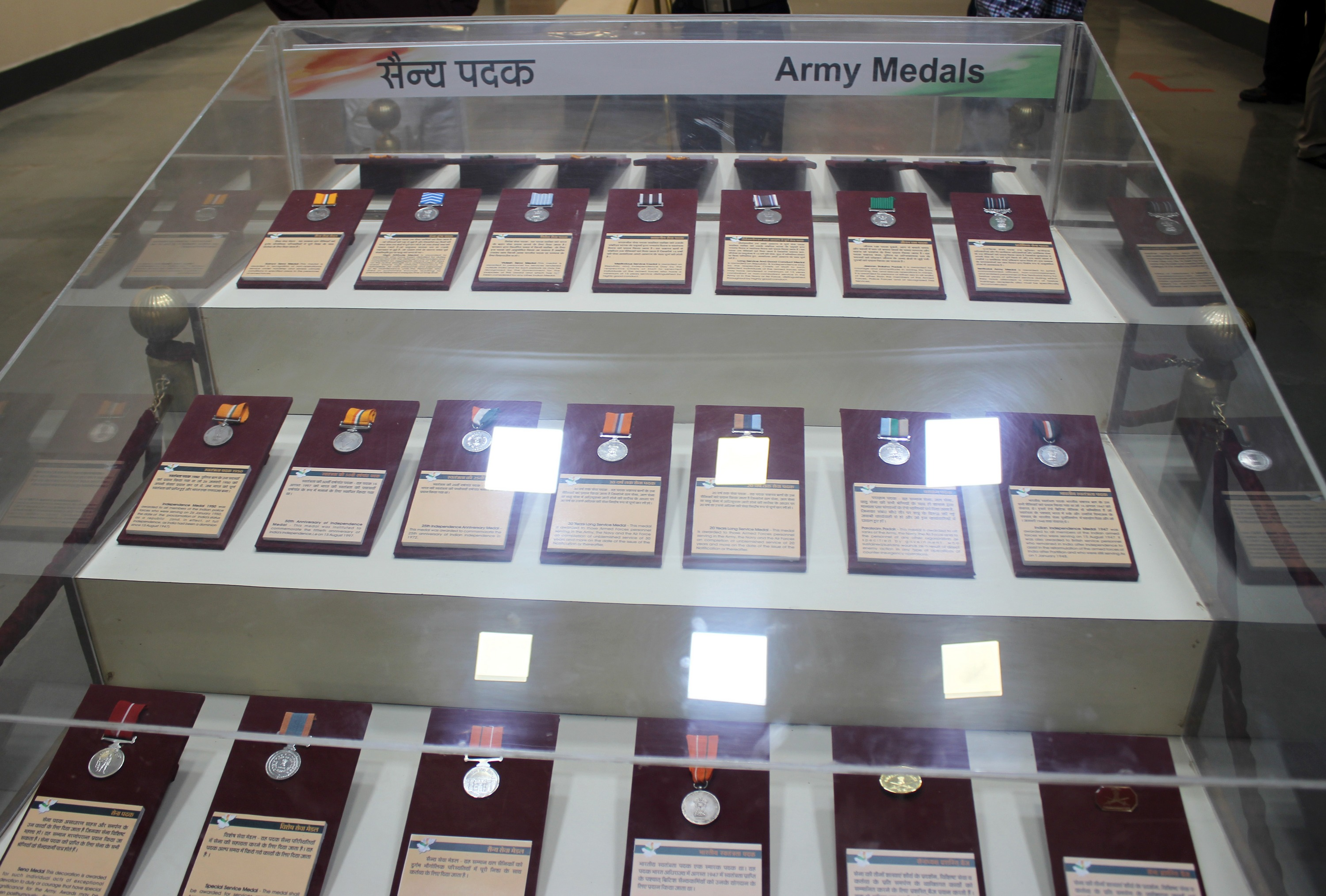
Army Medals

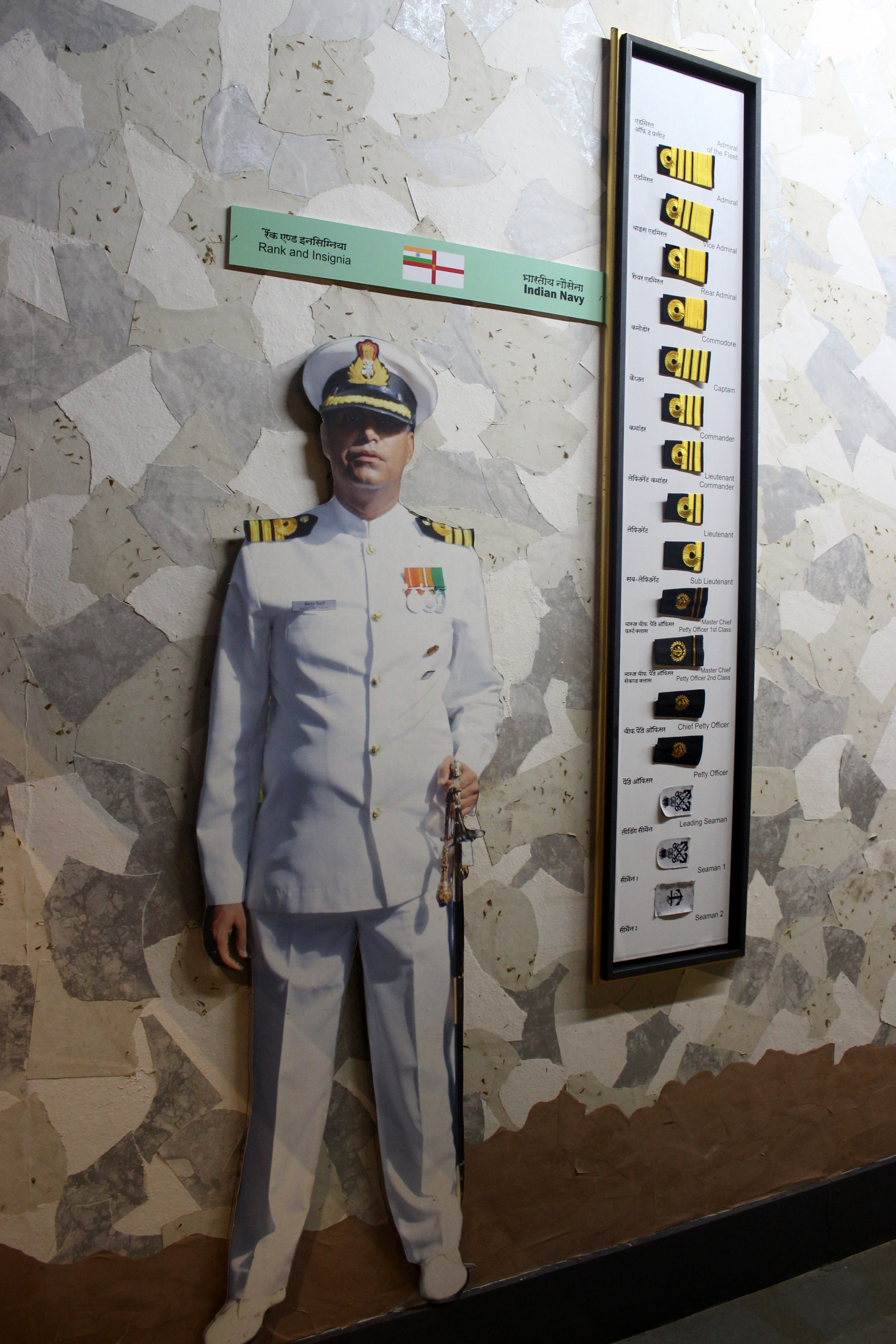
Indian Navy Rank and insignia

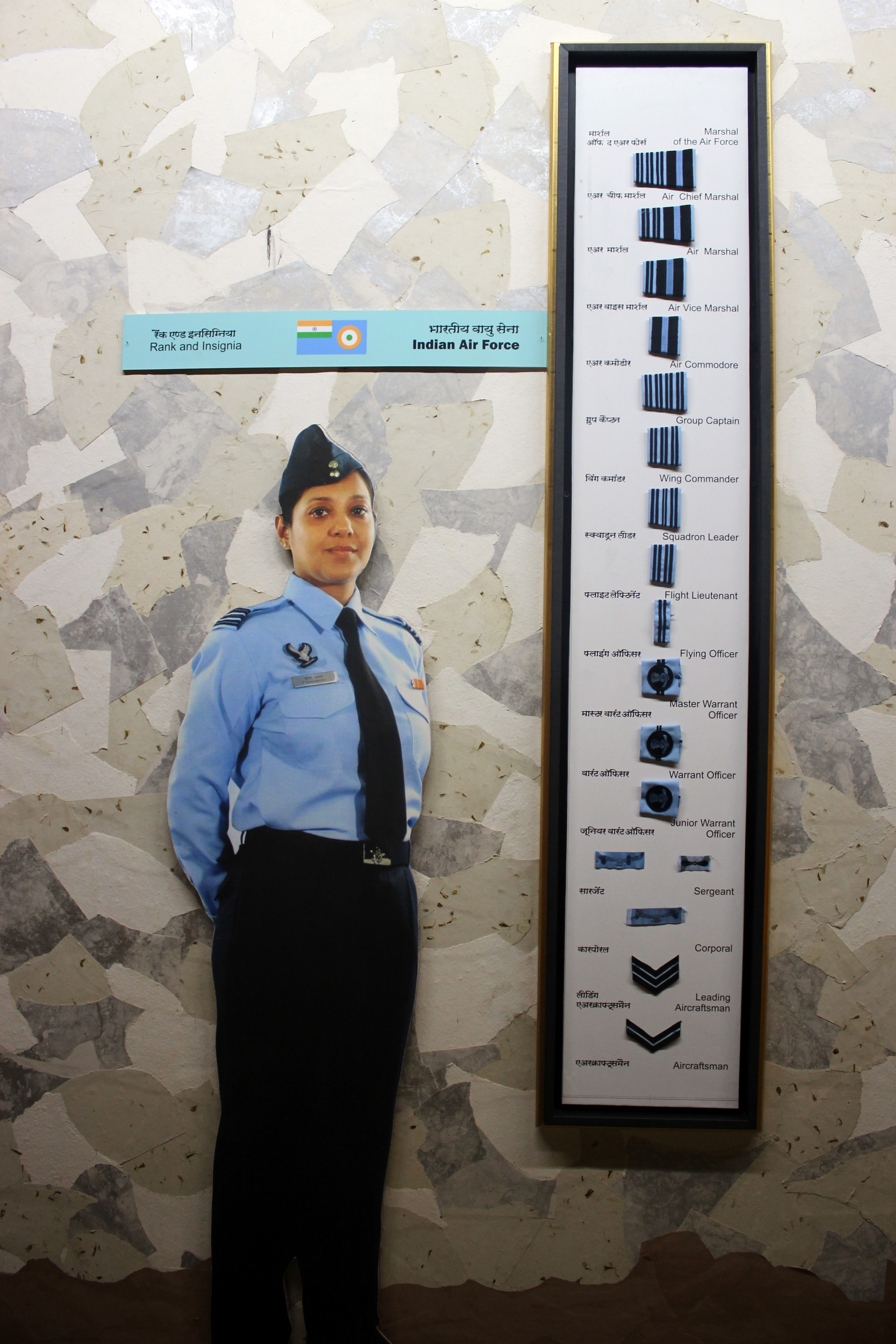
Indian Air Force Rank and insignia

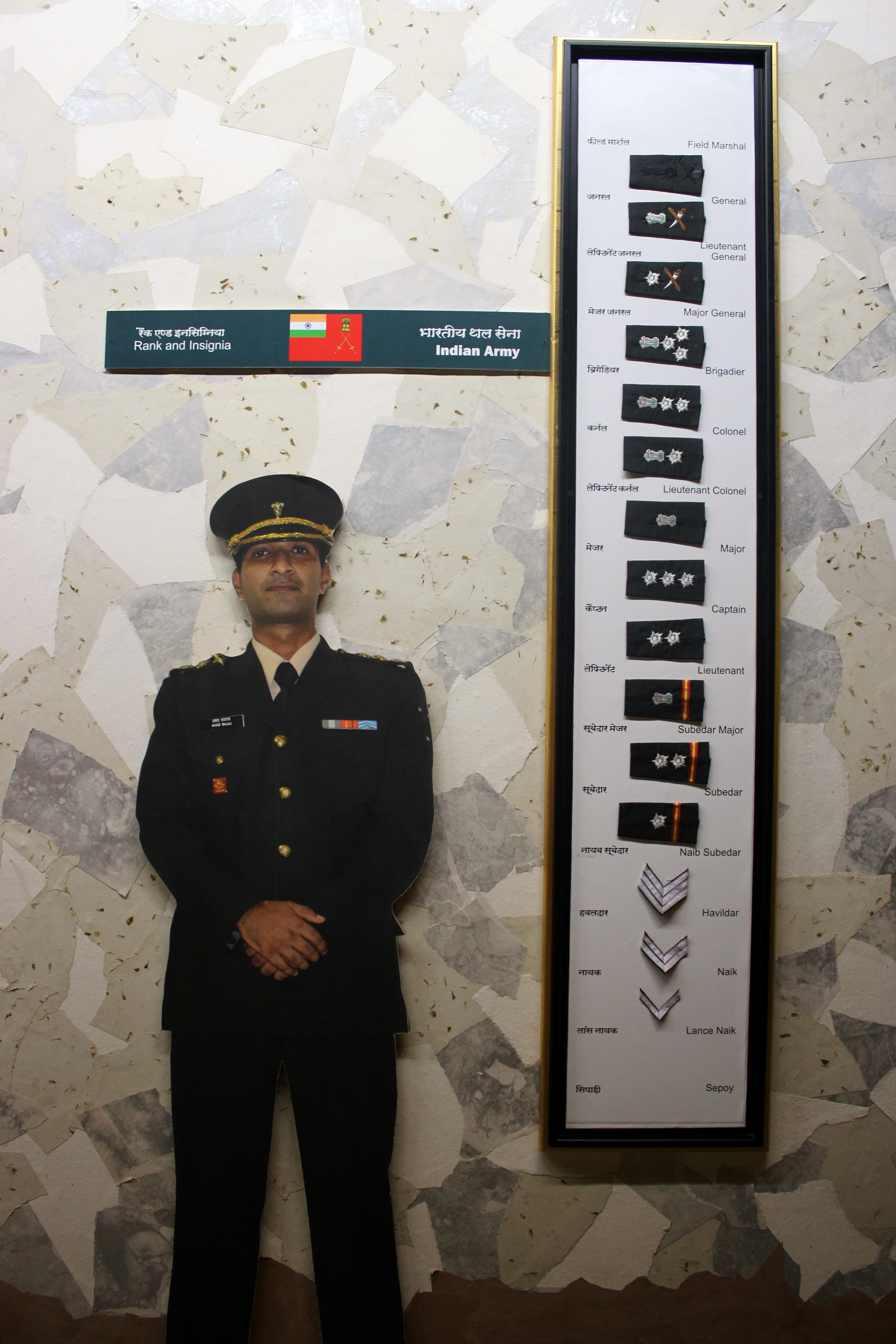
Indian Army Rank and insignia

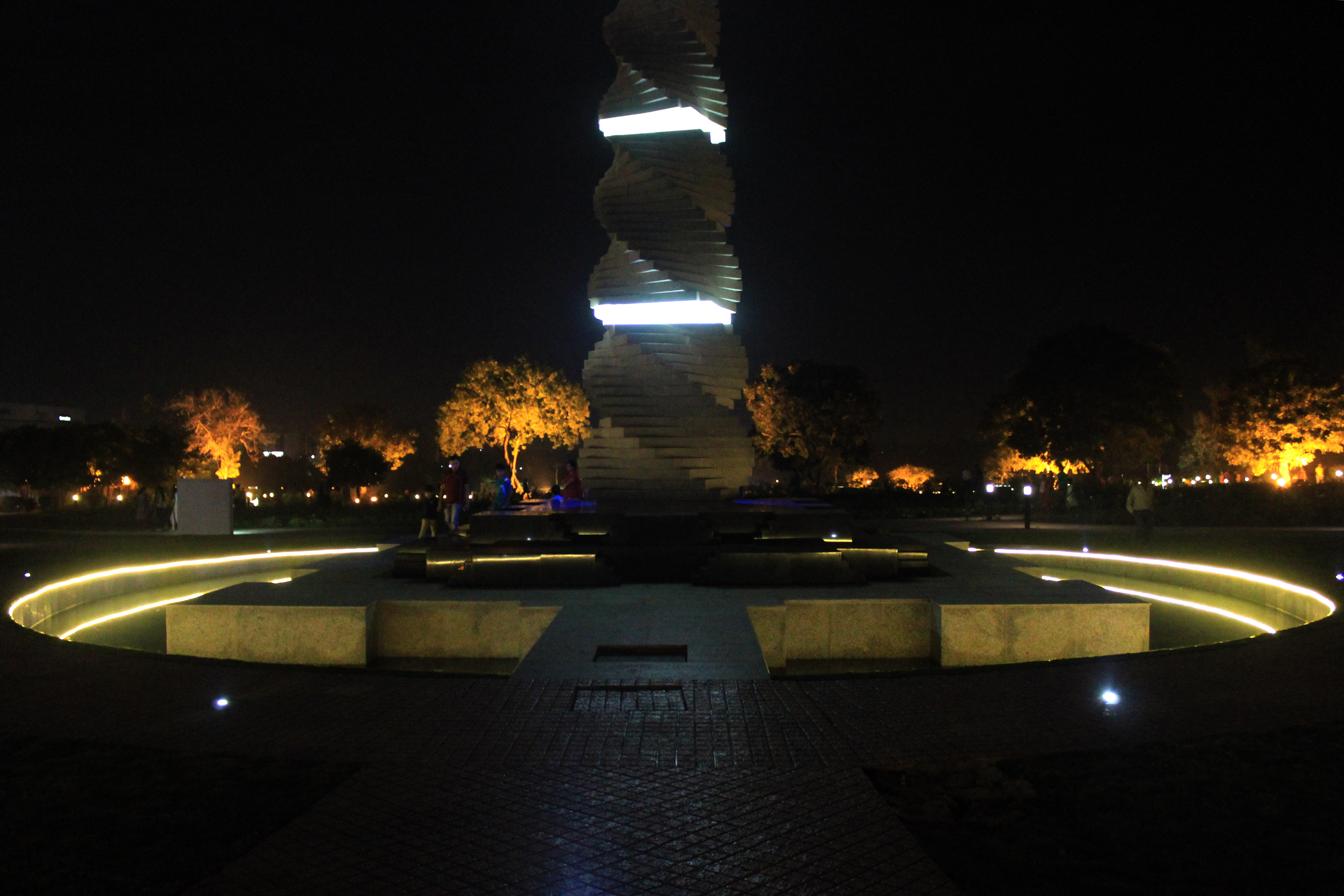

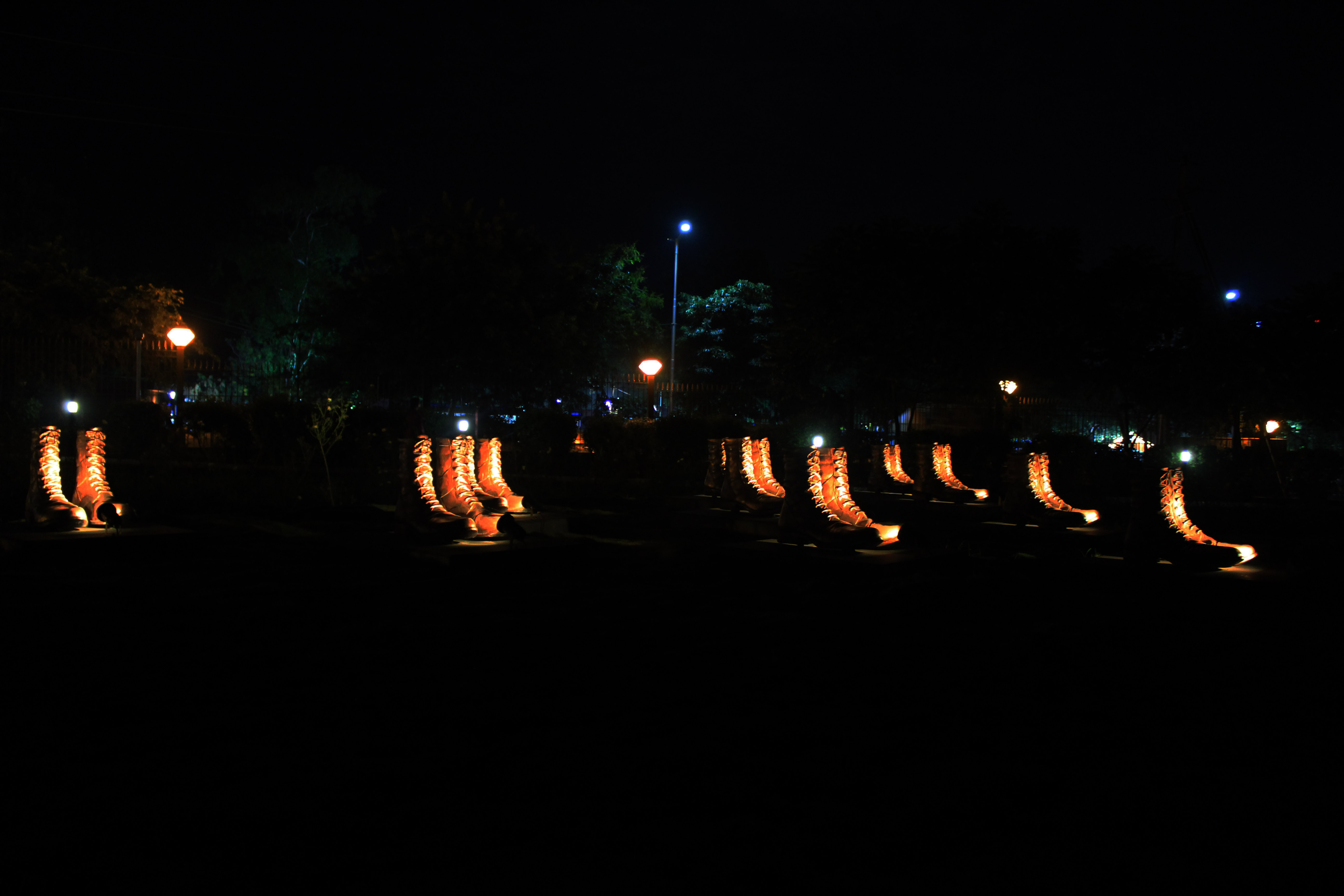

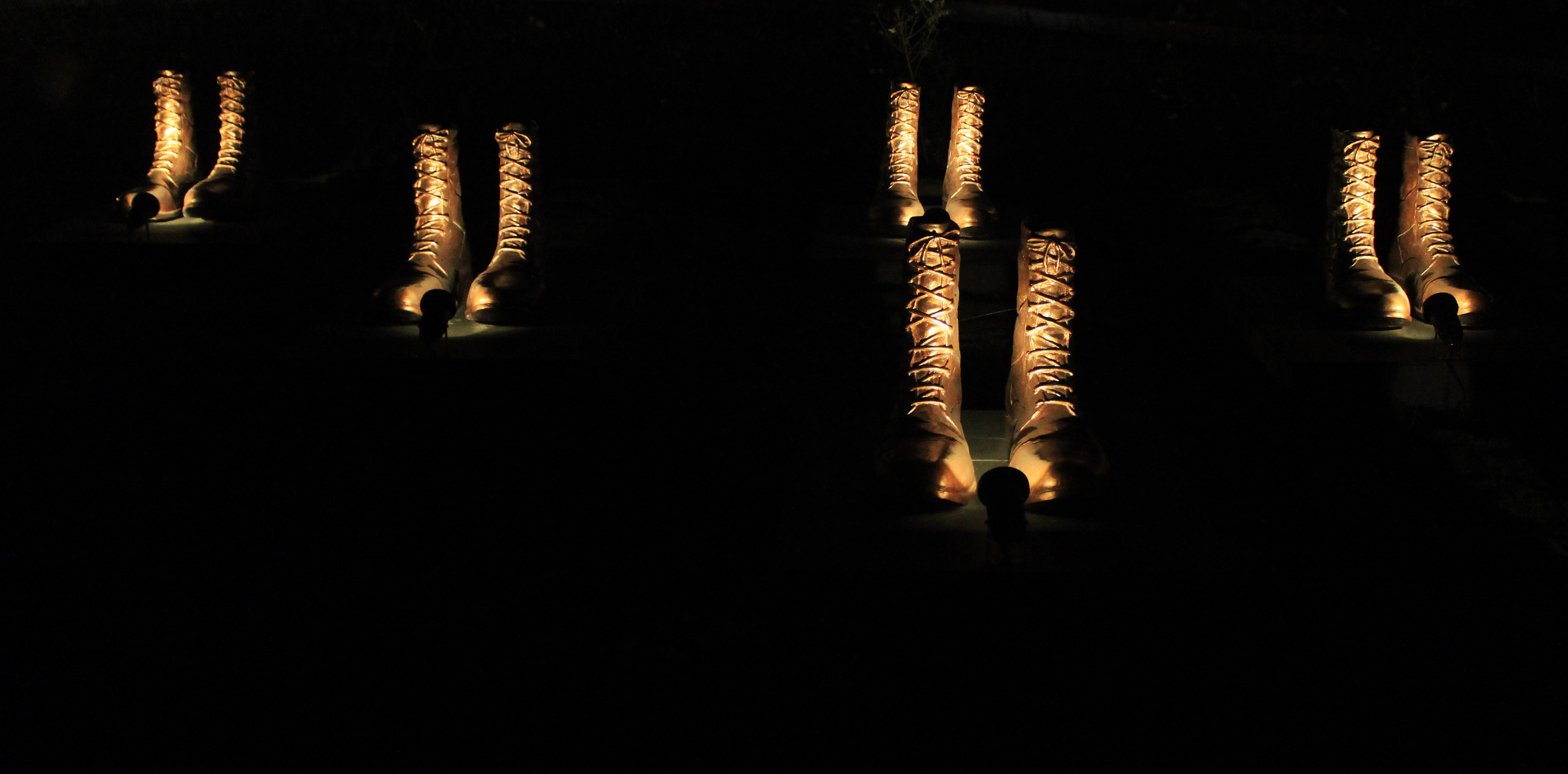

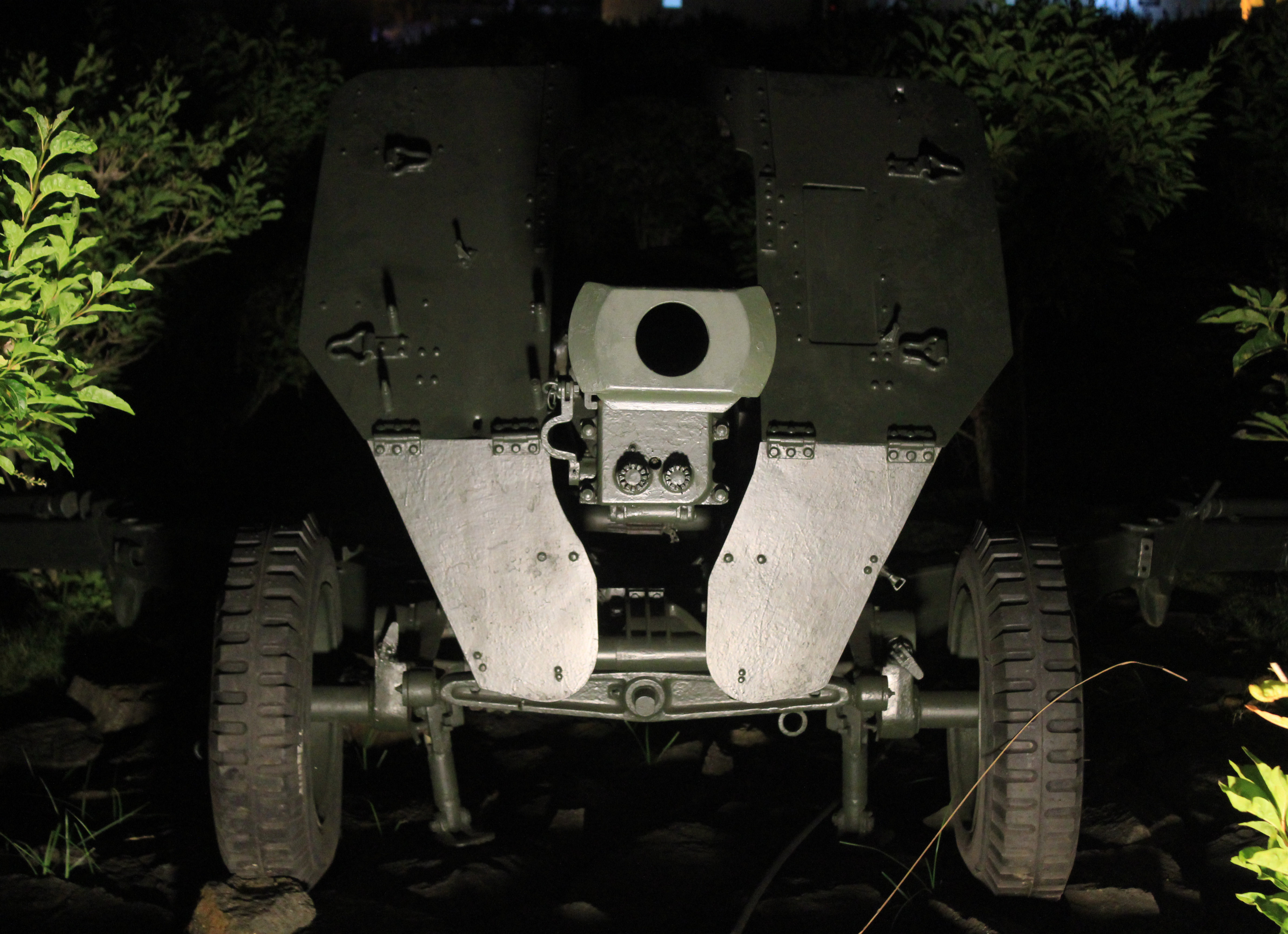

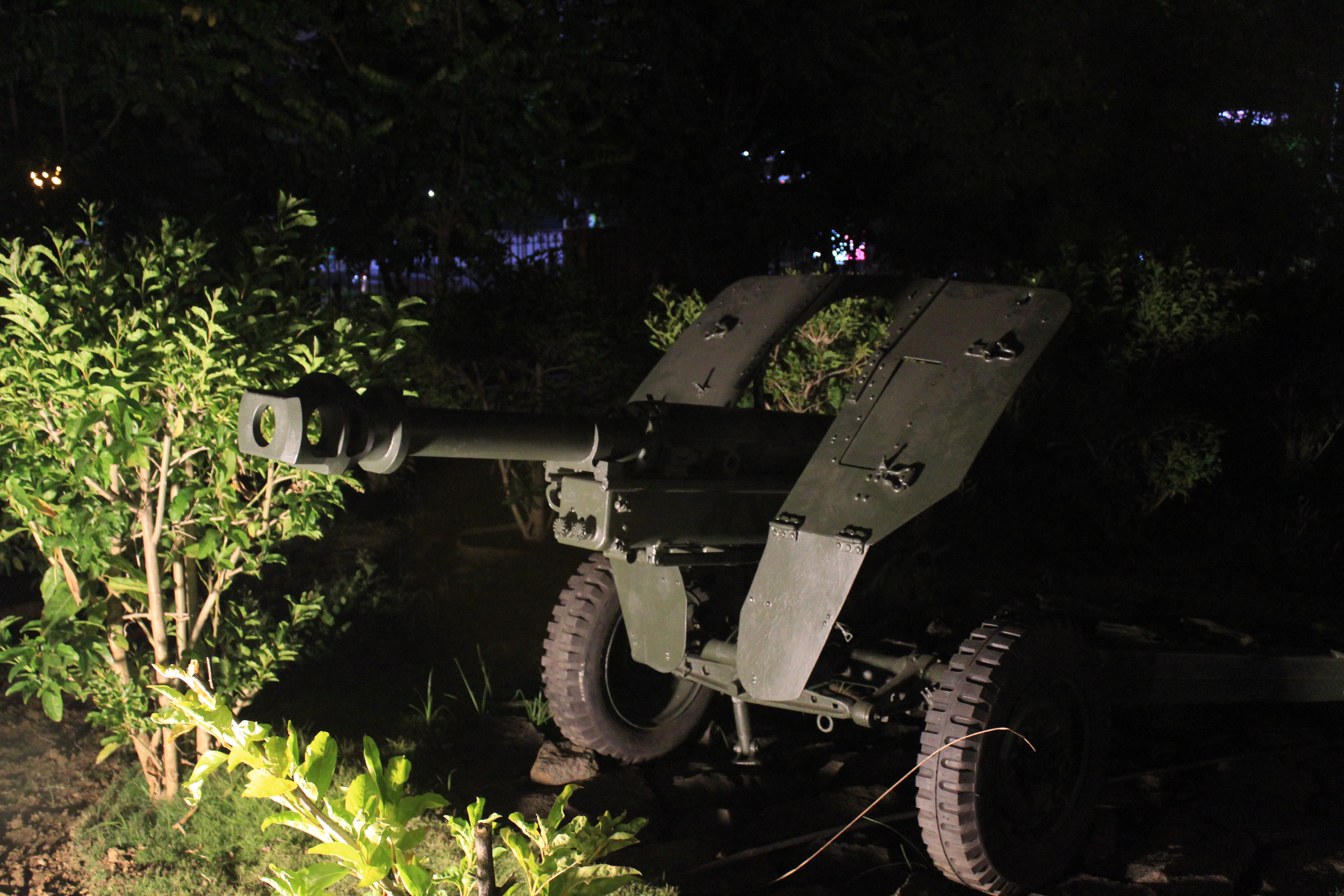

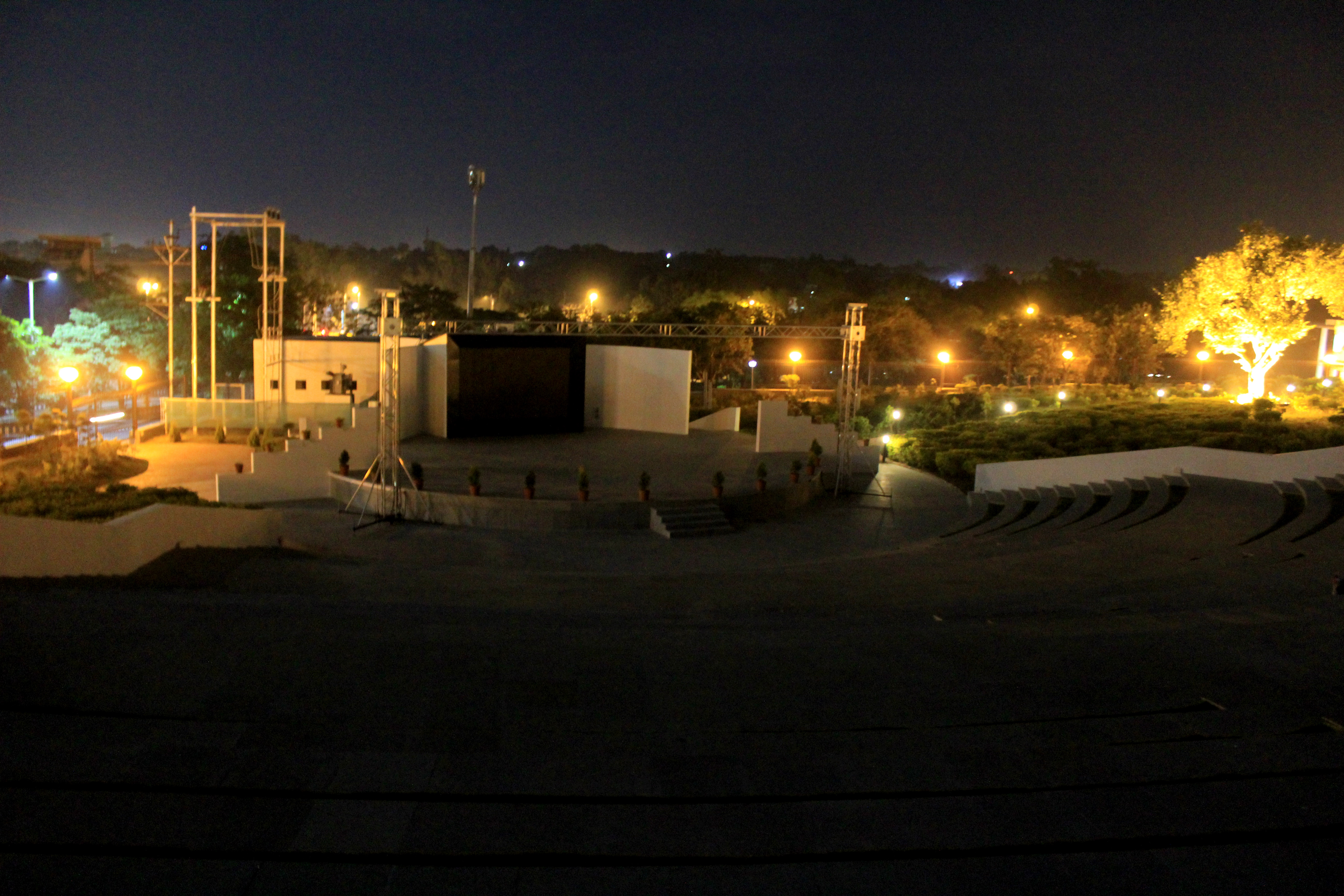
