= Riding Solo to the Top of the World =

- Directed by: Gaurav Jani
- Produced by: Dirt Track Productions
- Cinematography: Gaurav Jani
- Edited by: Sankalp Meshram
- Music by: Ved Nair
- Release date: 1 November 2006
- Running time: 94 minutes
- Country: India
- Language: English

Riding Solo to the Top of the World is a 2006 documentary film in English language directed by Gaurav Jani on the Chang pas of Ladakh, in India, about a journey of self-discovery.

== Plot ==
At Tso Kar during the filming of Riding Solo

Riding Solo is a film about filmmaker Gaurav Jani's solo motorcycle journey from Mumbai to one of the remotest places in the world, the Changthang Plateau in Ladakh, bordering China. Jani was a one-man camera crew unit who loaded his Royal Enfield Bullet 350CC Motorcycle (Loner) with 300 kilograms (660 lb) of equipment/supplies and set off on a journey to one of the world's most difficult terrains.
