= Shajith Koyeri =

Indian sound designer

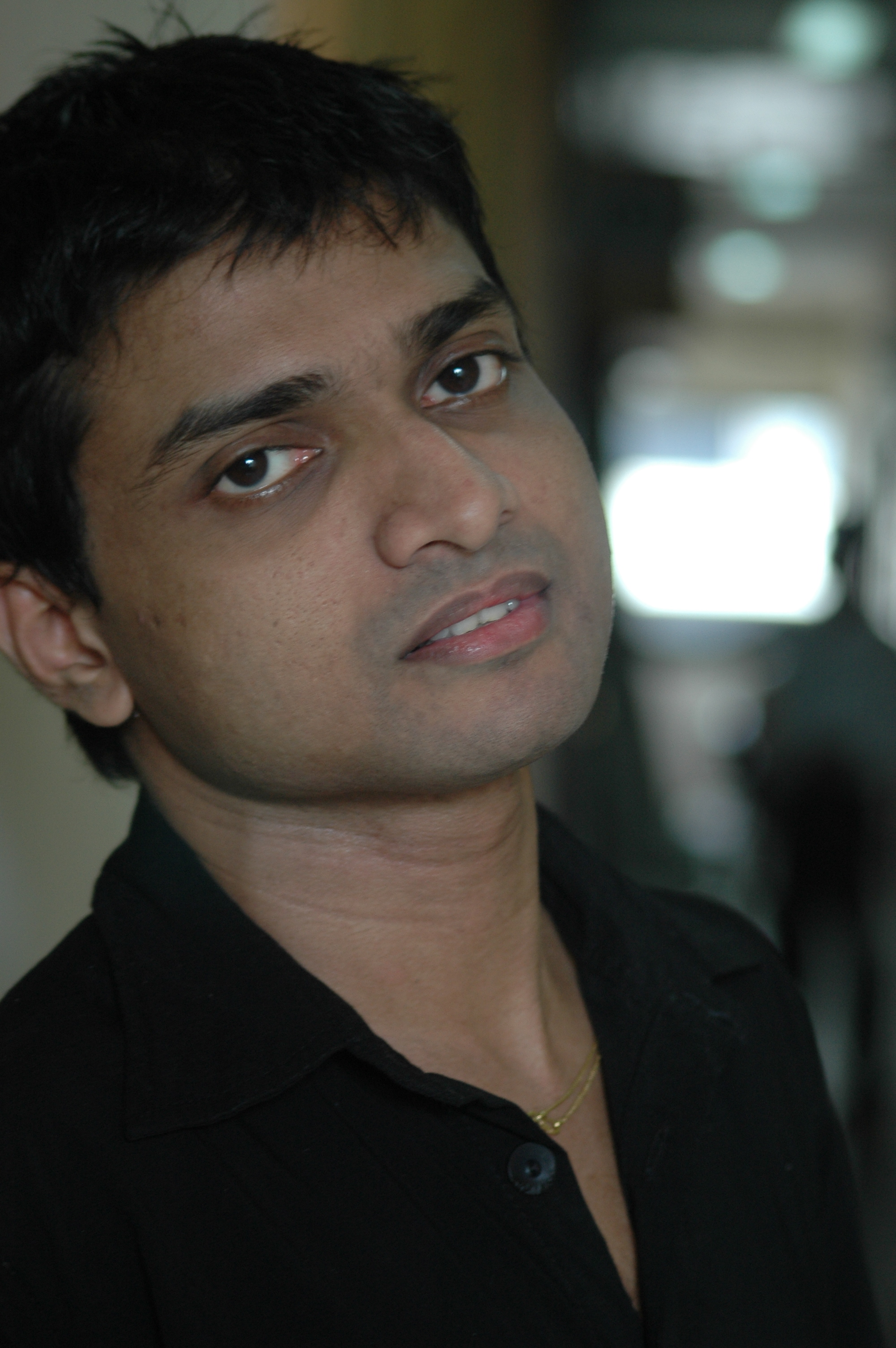
- Koyeri in 2009
- Born: Punnol, Kannur, Kerala, India
- Occupations: Sound editor, Sound designer, Dialogue editor, Foley editor, Premixing
- Years active: 1999 - Present

Shajith Koyeri is a sound designer specializing in sync sound technique in Indian cinema. He received the National Film Awards for Omkara and has won two Filmfare awards and two IIFA Awards. He is also the recipient of the Star Screen Award for Kaminey. Additionally, Shajith is known for his work in Foley editing and pre-mixing.

== Early life ==
Shajith Koyeri was born in Punnol, Thalassery in Kannur district of Kerala, to Soma Sundaran and Rathibayi. He attended Brennan College in Thalassery for his higher studies. He later relocated to Mumbai in 1999. His first independent work was with the movie, Perfect Husband in 2003. Later he worked for films like Sanjay Leela Bhansali's Black and Saawariya, Shimit Amin's Ab Tak Chappan, Ketan Mehta's Mangal Pandey: The Rising, Rohan Sippy's Bluffmaster!, Shashant Shah's Dasvidaniya and Chalo Dilli, Aparna Sen’s 15 Park Avenue, Abhishek Chaubey’s Ishqiya, Vishal Bhardwaj's Maqbool, The Blue Umbrella, Omkara and Kaminey, 7 Khoon Maaf to jot down a few. Besides, he has also worked on many documentaries and short films that have been showcased in film festivals around the world . The Life story of Shajith was narrated in The Echo which appeared in Malayala Manorama.

== Awards and nominations ==
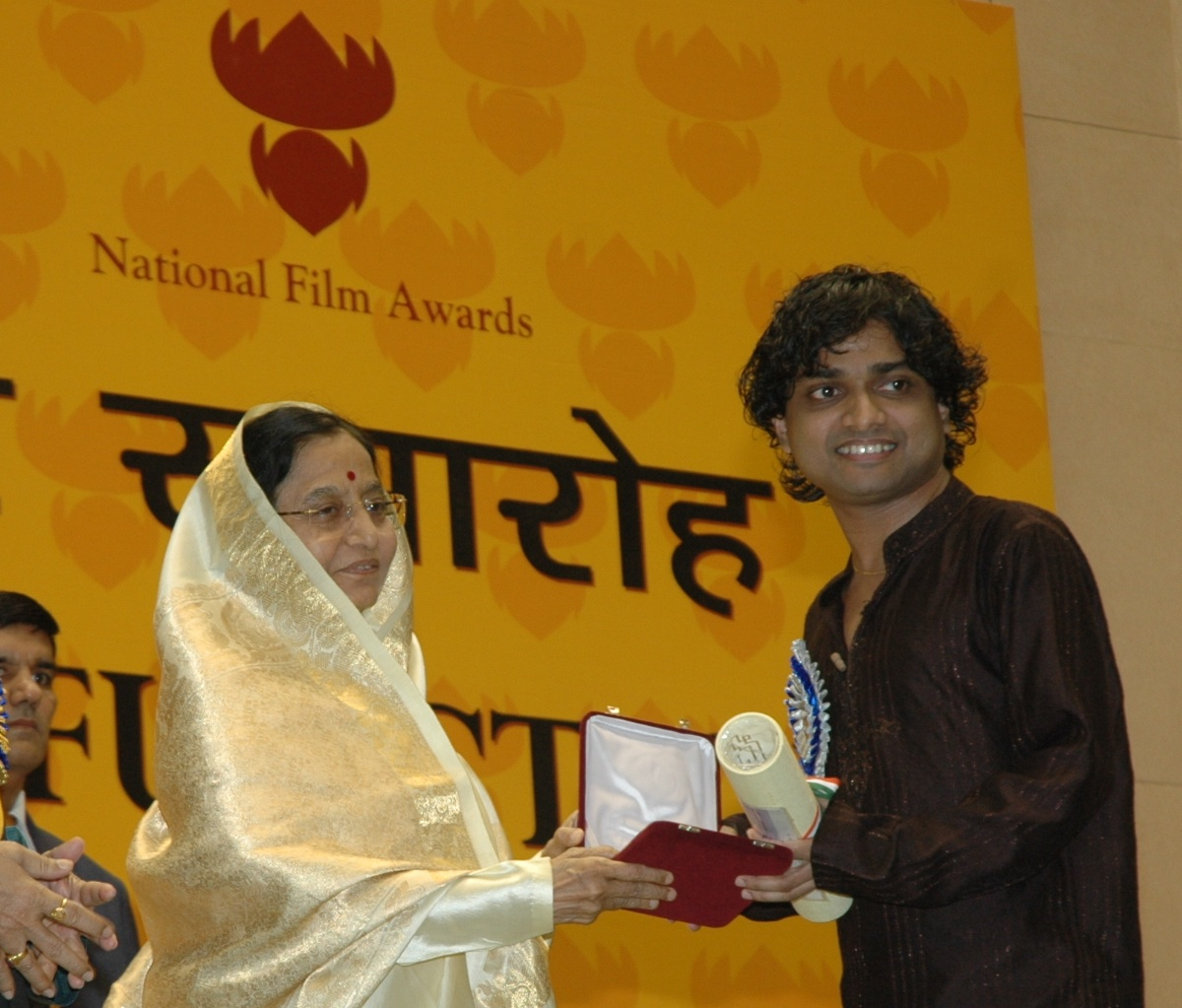
Shajith Koyeri receiving National Film Award

- 2006 Won: National Film Award for Omkara
- 2006 Won: Filmfare Award for Omkara
- 2006 Nominated: Star Screen Award for Omkara
- 2006 Nominated: Zee Cine Awards for Omkara
- 2006 Nominated: Bollywood Movie Awards for Omkara
- 2010 Won: Star Screen Award for Kaminey
- 2010 Nominated: Filmfare Award for Kaminey
- 2010 Nominated: Zee Cine Awards for Kaminey
- 2011 Nominated: Filmfare Award for Ishqiya
- 2011 Nominated: Star Screen Award for Ishqiya
- 2012 Nominated: Apsara Film & Television Producers Guild Awards for 7 Khoon Maaf
- 2012 Nominated Golden Rooster Awards for Dam999
- 2013 Won: IIFA Awards for Barfi!
- 2013 Nominated: Filmfare Award for Barfi!
- 2013 Nominated: Star Screen Award for Barfi!
- 2015 Won: Star Guild Awards for Haider
- 2015 Won: IIFA Awards for Haider
- 2015 Nominated: Filmfare Award for Haider
- 2016 Won: Filmfare Award for Talvar
- 2016: Nominated: Star Screen Award for Talvar and Dum Laga Ke Haisha
- 2017: Won: Star Screen Award for Rangoon and Dangal

== Selected filmography ==
- Amar Kaushik's Bala (2019 film)
- Nitesh Tiwari's Chhichhore
- Zoya Akhtar's Made in Heaven (TV series)
- Sharat Katariya's Sui Dhaaga
- Raj Kumar Gupta's India's Most Wanted
- Amar Kaushik's Stree
- Majid Majidi's Beyond the Clouds (2017 film)
- Dinesh Vijan's Raabta (film)
- Nitesh Tiwari's Dangal
- Vishal Bhardwaj’s Rangoon
- Rahul Bose’s Poorna
- Manish Harishankar's Laali Ki Shaadi Mein Laaddoo Deewana
- Meghna Gulzar's Talvar
- Sharat Katariya's Dum Laga Ke Haisha
- Vishal Bhardwaj’s Haider (film)
- Anurag Basu's Barfee
- Vishal Bhardwaj’s Maqbool
- Vishal Bhardwaj’s Kaminey
- Vishal Bhardwaj’s Omkara
- Abhishek Chaubey’s Ishqiya
- Shashant Shah's Dasvidaniya
- Ribhu Dasgupta's Te3n
- Arnab Chaudhuri's Arjun: The Warrior Prince
- Dev Benegal’s Road, Movie
- Raj Kumar Gupta's Ghanchakkar (film)
- Prabhu Deva's Rambo Rajkumar (film)
- Sanjay Leela Bhansali’s Black and Saawariya
- Shimit Amin’s Ab Tak Chappan
- Ketan Mehta’s Mangal Pandey: The Rising
- Vishal Bhardwaj’s Saat Khoon Maaf
- Rohan Sippy’s Bluffmaster!
- Vishal Bhardwaj’s The Blue Umbrella
- Shashant Shah's Chalo Dilli
- Manish Jha’s Matrubhoomi-A Nation Without Women
- Madhur Bhandarkar’s Traffic Signal (film)
- Aparna Sen’s 15 Park Avenue
- Rajesh Pillai's Traffic (2014 film)
- Shashant Shah's Bhajathe Raho
- Aditya Datt's Table No.21
- Reema Kagti’s Talaash (2012 film)
- Saahil Prem’s Mad About Dance
- Ishraq Shah's Ek Bura Aadmi
- Sohan Roy’s Dam 999
- Ajoy Varma's S.R.K
- Ajoy Varma's Dus Tola
- Feroz Abbas Khan’s Gandhi My Father
- Samir Karnik’s Kyun! Ho Gaya Na...
- Sudhir Mishra’s Hazaaron Khwaishen Aisi
- Roger Christian’s American Daylight
- Kaizad Gustad’s Boom
- Sriram Raghavan’s Ek Hasina Thi
- Aanand Surapur's The Fakir of Venice
- Rajat Kapoor’s Raghu Romeo
- Maneej Premnath's The Waiting Room
- Ritu serin & Tenzing's Dreaming Lhasa
- Rajat Kapoor’s Mithya
- Sanjay Gupta’s Musafir
- Rajshree Ojha’s Yatna
- Priya Singh's Perfect Husband
- Arjun Sajnani's Agni Varsha
- Rahul Bose’s Everybody Says I'm Fine!
- Yogesh Prathap's Boolean Mind
- Rajan Kumar Patel's Feast of Varanasi

Work as a Sound designer for Short films & Documentary

- Gitanjali Rao's Printed Rainbow
- Joy roy's Bimal Roy
- Shimona's Atreyee
- Avijit Mukul Kishore's Snapshots from family album
- Eye of the fish
- We home chaps
- Turtle people
- Mother Teresa
- Orange & Lemons
- Gandhi
- Rita Ranis Bombay Skies
- Highway
- Zahir

Documentary

- Truck Driver
