= Ram Gopal Varma filmography =

Ram Gopal Varma, often referred to by his initials RGV, is an Indian film director, screenwriter and producer, primarily known for his works in Hindi and Telugu cinema. Varma has directed films across multiple genres, including parallel cinema and docudrama noted for their gritty realism, technical finesse, and craft. Regarded as one of the pioneers and prolific filmmakers of new age Indian cinema.

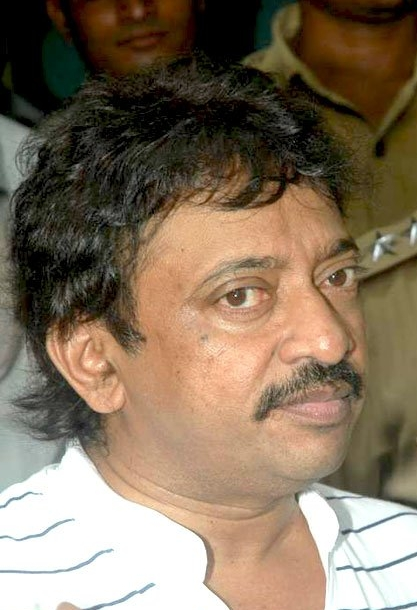

In 2010, Varma received critical acclaim at the Fribourg International Film Festival, Switzerland; a retrospective of his filmography, highlighting Mumbai Noir was staged by film critic Edouard Waintrop, a delegate in the Directors' Fortnight of the Cannes Film Festival. Satya and Company, in particular, were cited by British director Danny Boyle as influences on him for their "slick, often mesmerising portrayals of the Mumbai underworld", their display of "brutality and urban violence".

== Films ==
=== Feature films ===
Year	Title	Language	Director	Producer	Writer	Notes
1989	Siva	Telugu	Yes		Yes	
1990	Shiva	Hindi	Yes		Yes	
1991	Kshana Kshanam	Telugu	Yes		Yes	
1992	Antham; Drohi	Telugu, Hindi	Yes	Yes	Yes	
1992	Raat; Raatri	Telugu, Hindi	Yes	Yes	Yes	
1993	Gaayam	Telugu	Yes	Yes	Yes	
1994	Govinda Govinda	Telugu	Yes		Yes	
1995	Rangeela	Hindi	Yes	Yes	Yes	
1996	Deyyam	Telugu	Yes		Yes	
1996	Anaganaga Oka Roju	Telugu	Yes	Yes	Yes	
1997	Daud	Hindi	Yes	Yes	Yes	Also editor
1998	Satya	Hindi	Yes	Yes		
1999	Prema Katha	Telugu	Yes		Yes	
1999	Kaun	Hindi	Yes			
1999	Mast	Hindi	Yes	Yes		
2000	Jungle	Hindi	Yes			
2002	Company	Hindi	Yes	Yes		
2003	Bhoot	Hindi	Yes		Yes	
2004	Naach	Hindi	Yes	Yes		
2004	Madhyanam Hathya	Telugu	Yes	Yes	Yes	
2005	Sarkar	Hindi	Yes	Yes	Yes	
2006	Shiva	Hindi	Yes	Yes		
2006	Darna Zaroori Hai	Hindi	Yes	Yes		Segment: "Imaginary Ghost"
2007	Nishabd	Hindi	Yes	Yes	Yes	
2007	Ram Gopal Varma Ki Aag	Hindi	Yes	Yes	Yes	
2007	Darling	Hindi	Yes			
2008	Sarkar Raj	Hindi	Yes	Yes	Yes	co-produced with Praveen Nischol; story credits
2008	Contract	Hindi	Yes			
2008	Phoonk	Hindi	Yes		Yes	
2009	Agyaat	Hindi	Yes	Yes	Yes	
2010	Rann	Hindi	Yes		Yes	
2010	Rakta Charitra	Telugu, Hindi	Yes		Yes	
2010	Rakta Charitra 2	Telugu, Hindi	Yes		Yes	Partially reshot in Tamil as Raththa Saritham
2011	Katha Screenplay Darsakatvam Appalaraju	Telugu	Yes		Yes	
2011	Dongala Mutha	Telugu	Yes		Yes	
2011	Not a Love Story	Hindi	Yes		Yes	
2012	Department	Hindi	Yes		Yes	
2012	Bhoot Returns	Hindi	Yes		Yes	
2013	The Attacks of 26/11	Hindi	Yes		Yes	
2013	Satya 2	Hindi, Telugu	Yes		Yes	
2014	Rowdy	Telugu	Yes		Yes	
2014	Ice Cream	Telugu	Yes		Yes	
2014	Anukshanam	Telugu	Yes		Yes	
2014	Ice Cream 2	Telugu	Yes		Yes	
2015	365 Days	Telugu	Yes		Yes	
2016	Killing Veerappan	Kannada	Yes		Yes	
2016	Attack	Telugu	Yes		Yes	
2016	Veerappan	Hindi	Yes		Yes	
2016	Vangaveeti	Telugu	Yes		Yes	
2017	Sarkar 3	Hindi	Yes			
2018	Officer	Telugu	Yes	Yes	Yes	
2019	Lakshmi's NTR	Telugu	Yes		Yes	Co-directed with Agasthya Manju
2019	Amma Rajyam Lo Kadapa Biddalu	Telugu	Yes		Yes	Co-directed with Siddartha Thatolu
2021	D Company	Hindi	Yes		Yes	
2021	12 'O' Clock	Hindi	Yes	Yes	Yes	
2021	Deyyam	Telugu	Yes		Yes	
2022	Konda	Telugu	Yes	Yes	Yes	
2022	Dangerous	Hindi	Yes	Yes	Yes	Also editor
2022	Ladki: Dragon Girl	Hindi	Yes	Yes	Yes	
2022	Aasha Encounter	Telugu	Uncredited	Uncredited	Uncredited	
2024	Vyuham	Telugu	Yes		Yes	
2024	Shapadham	Telugu	Yes		Yes	
2027	Police Station Mein Bhoot †	Hindi	Yes		TBA	Post-production
2027	Police Company †	Hindi	Yes		Yes	Filming

=== Writer and/or producer only ===
Year	Title	Language	Producer	Writer	Notes
1993	Money	Telugu	Yes		
1993	Thiruda Thiruda	Tamil		Story	
1994	Money Money	Telugu	Yes		
1995	Gulabi	Telugu		Yes	
1997	Wife of V. Varaprasad	Telugu	Yes		
1998	Dil Se..	Hindi	Yes		
1999	Shool	Hindi	Yes	Yes	
2001	Love Ke Liye Kuchh Bhi Karega	Hindi	Yes		
2001	Pyaar Tune Kya Kiya	Hindi	Yes		
2002	Road	Hindi	Yes		
2003	Darna Mana Hai	Hindi	Yes		
2004	Ek Hasina Thi	Hindi	Yes		
2004	Ab Tak Chhappan	Hindi	Yes		
2004	Vaastu Shastra	Hindi	Yes		
2004	Gayab	Hindi	Yes		
2005	My Wife's Murder	Hindi	Yes		
2005	Main Madhuri Dixit Banna Chahti Hoon	Hindi	Yes		
2005	D	Hindi	Yes	Yes	
2005	James	Hindi	Yes		
2005	Mr Ya Miss	Hindi	Yes		
2006	Darwaza Bandh Rakho	Hindi	Yes		
2006	Shock	Telugu	Yes		
2007	Go	Hindi	Yes		
2008	Raksha	Telugu	Presenter	Story	
2010	Phoonk 2	Hindi	Yes		
2011	Shabri	Hindi	Yes		
2011	Bejawada	Telugu	Yes	Story	
2013	Psycho	Telugu	Yes	Yes	
2018	Bhairava Geetha	Telugu; Kannada	Yes	Yes	
2020	Beautiful	Hindi	Yes		
2020	Murder	Telugu	Yes		
2020	Corona Virus	Telugu	Yes	Story	
2025	Saaree	Telugu		Yes	
TBA	Untitled Mohit Suri film †	Hindi	Yes	Yes	Pre-production

== Acting credits ==
Year	Title	Role	Language	Notes
2014	Ice Cream 2	Producer	Telugu	
2016	Vangaveeti	Narrator	Telugu	Voice role
2019	Amma Rajyam Lo Kadapa Biddalu	Himself	Telugu	Cameo
2024	Kalki 2898 AD	Chintu	Telugu	Cameo

== Short films ==
Year	Title	Language	Director	Producer	Screenwriter	Notes	Ref.
2014	A day in the life of Lakshmi Manchu's feet	Sound	Yes				
2017	Meri Beti Sunny Leone Banna Chaahti Hai	Hindi	Yes	Yes			
2018	God, Sex and Truth	English	Yes		Yes	Documentary	
2020	Climax	Telugu	Yes			Released on RGV World; also editor	
2020	Naked	Telugu	Yes			Released on RGV World; also editor	
2020	Power Star	Telugu	Yes	Yes	Yes	Released on RGV World; also editor	
2020	Thriller	Telugu	Yes	Yes	Yes	Released on RGV World; also editor	

== Television ==
Year	Title	Language	Credited as
2005	Darna Mana Hai	Hindi	Producer
2019	Guns and Thighs	Hindi	Creator, director, writer
2021	Idhi Mahabharatam Kaadhu	Telugu	Director, editor
2022	Dhahanam	Telugu	Producer

== Discography ==
Song	Year	Album	Composer
"Luck To Siva Cinema"	2011	Katha Screenplay Darsakatvam Appalaraju	Koti
"Maya Bazaaru"	2011	Katha Screenplay Darsakatvam Appalaraju	Koti
"Naa Peru Srisailam"	2011	Katha Screenplay Darsakatvam Appalaraju	Koti
"Emetti Penchare"	2011	Katha Screenplay Darsakatvam Appalaraju	Koti
"Unbelievable"	2011	Katha Screenplay Darsakatvam Appalaraju	Koti
"Ring Roadu"	2011	Katha Screenplay Darsakatvam Appalaraju	Koti
"Publicity"	2011	Katha Screenplay Darsakatvam Appalaraju	Koti
"Kottukundam Thittukundam"	2011	Katha Screenplay Darsakatvam Appalaraju	Koti
"Caste Feeling"	2019	Amma Rajyam Lo Kadapa Biddalu	Ravi Shankar
"Babu Champesthaadu"	2019	Amma Rajyam Lo Kadapa Biddalu	Ravi Shankar

== Frequent collaborators ==
Frequent collaborator	Siva (1989)	Shiva (1990)	Antham (1992)	Rangeela (1995)	Daud (1997)	Satya (1998)	Kaun? (1999)	Mast (1999)	Jungle (2000)	Bhoot (2003)	Sarkar (2005)	Darna Zaroori Hai (2006)	Nishabd (2007)	Aag (2007)	Sarkar Raj (2008)	Rann (2010)	Department (2012)	Sarkar 3 (2017)	Officer (2018)
Amitabh Bachchan	No	No	No	No	No	No	No	No	No	No	Yes	Yes	Yes	Yes	Yes	Yes	Yes	Yes	No
Urmila Matondkar	No	No	Yes	Yes	Yes	Yes	Yes	Yes	Yes	Yes	No	No	No	Yes	No	No	No	No	No
Nagarjuna	Yes	Yes	Yes	No	No	No	No	No	No	No	No	No	No	No	No	No	No	No	Yes
