= Sarkar (film series) =

Sarkar film series
- Directed by: Ram Gopal Varma
- Written by: Manish Gupta (Sarkar); Prashant Pandey (Sarkar Raj); P. Jaya Kumar; Nilesh Girkar (Sarkar 3)
- Screenplay by: Ram Gopal Varma
- Produced by: Ram Gopal Varma; Parag Sanghvi (Sarkar); Praveen Nischol (Sarkar Raj); Rahul Mittra; Anand Pandit; Gopal Shivram Dalvi; Krishan Choudhary; WeOne (Sarkar 3)
- Starring: Amitabh Bachchan; Abhishek Bachchan; Aishwarya Rai Bachchan; Supriya Pathak; Tanishaa
- Cinematography: Amit Roy; Amol Rathod (Sarkar 3)
- Edited by: Amit Parmar; Nitin Gupta (Sarkar); Nipun Ashok Gupta (Sarkar Raj); Anwar Ali (Sarkar 3)
- Music by: Amar Mohile; Bapi-Tutul; Ravi Shankar (Sarkar 3)
- Production companies: Alumbra Entertainment; Wave Cinemas; Company Product; AB Corp Ltd
- Distributed by: K Sera Sera; Sahara One (Sarkar); Showman Pictures; Balaji Motion Pictures (Sarkar Raj); Eros International (Sarkar 3)
- Release dates: 1 July 2005 (1); 6 June 2008 (2); 12 May 2017 (3)
- Country: India
- Language: Hindi
- Budget: ₹76 crore (US$7.9 million) (Three films)
- Box office: ₹100 crore (US$10 million) (Two films)

Sarkar is a series of Indian political crime thriller films set in the world of Marathi politics and crime, co-produced and directed by Ram Gopal Varma. The first part Sarkar released in 2005, the second part Sarkar Raj in 2008, and the third installment Sarkar 3 in 2017.

== Overview ==
=== Sarkar (2005) ===
Subhash Nagre (Amitabh Bachchan), known to his followers as Sarkar, lives in Mumbai. The opening scenes show a rape victim's father (Veerendra Saxena) approaching Sarkar for justice (which the corrupt law and order system has failed to deliver) which Sarkar promptly establishes by having the rapist beaten up by his henchmen. His son, Vishnu (Kay Kay Menon), plays a sleazy producer who is more interested in the film actress Sapna (Nisha Kothari) than his wife Amrita (Rukhsar). Sarkar's other, more upright son, Shankar (Abhishek Bachchan), returns from the United States with his love Pooja (Katrina Kaif) after completing his education there. Pooja's doubts about Sarkar's image cause Shankar, who firmly believes in his father's righteousness, to break up with her later in the movie.

One day, a Dubai-based don, Rasheed (Zakir Hussain) tries to strike a deal with Sarkar; he promptly refuses on moral grounds and also forbids him from doing it himself. Rasheed tries to eliminate Sarkar's supremacy with the help of Selvar Mani (Kota Srinivasa Rao), Sarkar's former associate, Vishram Bhagat and Swami Virendra (Jeeva). Meanwhile, they trap Sarkar by assassinating a righteous, upright, Ahimsa political leader and an outspoken critic of Sarkar, Motilal Khurana (Anupam Kher). Everyone, including Vishnu believe that Sarkar is guilty but Shankar has deep faith in his father. Sarkar gets arrested. Shankar now takes over the position of Sarkar temporarily. On learning of a plot to murder his father in prison, he approaches the police commissioner (Anant Jog) who mocks him and his father besides not providing protection. By the time he reaches the prison and appropriate action is taken, the attempt on Sarkar's life is already made. Sarkar is later acquitted. He remains bedridden as Shankar takes on Sarkar's enemies.

Meanwhile, Selvar Mani, Swami, Vishram and Rasheed try to convince Vishnu to murder Sarkar. Vishnu was previously thrown out of Sarkar's house because he had murdered the actor who was having an affair with Sapna. Vishnu returns home pretending to have repented. When he approaches Sarkar in the dark of the night with the intent of murdering him, Shankar foils his plan and later kills him (establishing justice by the way of his father). Shankar eliminates Rasheed, Vishram and Selvar Mani. He also succeeds in making Swami his puppet. Shankar has also realised that Chief Minister Madan Rathore (Deepak Shirke) also has a part in the attempt to end Sarkar and his rule. This results in legal action against the Chief Minister. The closing scenes show people approaching Shankar for justice and his father apparently retired.

=== Sarkar Raj (2008) ===
The sequel is chronologically set two years after the first film. Anita Rajan (Aishwarya Rai Bachchan), CEO of an international electrical power firm based in London, holds a meeting with Mike Rajan (Victor Banerjee), her father and boss and Hassan Qazi, as a seemingly shady adviser and facilitator; regarding an ambitious proposal to set up a multimillion-dollar power plant in rural parts of the state of Maharashtra in India.

Qazi states that this project will be impossible due to possible political entanglements. When Anita asks him for a solution, Qazi states that enlisting the support of Subhash Nagre (Amitabh Bachchan) (commonly referred to by his title of Sarkar), who he describes as a criminal in the garb of a popular and influential political leader, might help their cause. The resulting socio-political drama forms the crux of the story.

=== Sarkar 3 (2017) ===
In 2009, Ram Gopal Varma stated that he had no plans finalised for the third installment in the series and subsequently shelved Sarkar 3. However, in 2012, it was reported that the sequel was in the pre production stage. The film was expected to go on floors at the end of 2013, primarily with the same cast of Amitabh and Abhishek Bachchan, albeit leaving the latter's character dead at the end of Sarkar Raj. Aishwarya Rai was reported to have been left out.

In August 2016, director Ram Gopal Varma confirmed Sarkar 3. He stated on Twitter that Abhishek and Aishwarya will not be a part of the third installment.

== Cast and characters ==
Character	Film		
Character	Sarkar (2005)	Sarkar Raj (2008)	Sarkar 3 (2017)
Subhash Nagre Sarkar	Amitabh Bachchan	Amitabh Bachchan	Amitabh Bachchan
Pushpa Nagre	Supriya Pathak	Supriya Pathak	Supriya Pathak
Shankar Nagre	Abhishek Bachchan	Abhishek Bachchan	Abhishek Bachchan (Archived footage)
Avantika	Tanishaa	Tanishaa	
Chander	Ravi Kale	Ravi Kale	
Vishnu Nagre	Kay Kay Menon	Kay Kay Menon (Archived footage)	
Pooja	Katrina Kaif		
Motilal Khuana	Anupam Kher		
Amrita	Rukhsar		
Khan Saab	Ishrat Ali		
Vishram Bhagat	Raju Mavani		
Rashid	Zakir Hussain		
Selver Mani	Kota Srinivasa Rao		
Girl's father	Virendra Saxena		
Police Commissioner	Anant Jog		
Chief Minister Madan Rathod	Deepak Shirke		
Hero in Vishnu's film	Carran Kapoor		
Heroine in Vishnu's film	Nisha Kothari		
Virendra Swami	Jeeva		
Shobha	Mangal Kenkre		
Pooja's father	Saurabh Dubey		
Anita Rajan		Aishwarya Rai Bachchan	
Hassan Qazi		Govind Namdeo	
Mike Rajan		Victor Banerjee	
Karunesh Kaanga		Sayaji Shinde	
Rao Saab		Dilip Prabhavalkar	
Bala		Sumeet Nijhawan	
Kantilal Vora		Upendra Limaye	
Sanjay Somji		Rajesh Sringarpure	
Chief Minister Sunil Shinde		Shishir Sharma	
Negi (the mystery man)		Javed Ansari	
Shivaji "Cheeku" Nagre	Chintan Atul Shah		Amit Sadh
Annu Karkare			Yami Gautam
Govind Deshpande			Manoj Bajpayee
Gokul Satam			Ronit Roy
Michael Vallya (Sir)			Jackie Shroff
Raman Guru			Parag Tyagi
Gorakh Rampur			Bharat Dhabolkar
Rukku Bai Devi			Rohini Hattangadi

== Crew ==
Occupation	Film		
Occupation	Sarkar (2005)	Sarkar Raj (2008)	Sarkar 3 (2017)
Director	Ram Gopal Varma	Ram Gopal Varma	Ram Gopal Varma
Producer(s)	Ram Gopal Varma; Parag Sanghvi	Ram Gopal Varma; Praveen Nischol	Rahul Mittra; Anand Pandit; Gopal Shivram Dalvi; Krishan Choudhary; WeOne
Screenplay	Manish Gupta; Ram Gopal Varma	Prashant Pandey; Ram Gopal Varma	Ram Gopal Varma; P. Jaya Kumar
Story	Manish Gupta; Ram Gopal Varma	Prashant Pandey; Ram Gopal Varma	Nilesh Girkar; Ram Gopal Varma
Composer(s)	Amar Mohile; Bapi-Tutul	Amar Mohile; Bapi-Tutul	Ravi Shankar
Cinematography	Amit Roy	Amit Roy	Amol Rathod
Editor	Amit Parmar; Nitin Gupta	Amit Parmar; Nipun Ashok Gupta	Anwar Ali

== Production ==
The first film, Sarkar (2005), is often said to be a remake of The Godfather (1972).

Debutante Rajesh Shringarpore's character of Sanjay Somji in its sequel Sarkar Raj (2008) was also reportedly based on Raj Thackeray, the estranged nephew of political leader Bal Thackeray; thus furthering the general viewpoint that the series is based on Bal Thackeray and his family. Apparently Ram Gopal Verma had even shown Raj Thackeray rushes of the film to allay his fears of being wrongly portrayed.

== Release and revenue ==
Film	Release date	Budget	Box office revenue
Sarkar	1 July 2005	₹130 million (US$1.4 million)	₹400 million (US$4.2 million)
Sarkar Raj	6 June 2008	₹280 million (US$2.9 million)	₹594.6 million (US$6.2 million)
Sarkar 3	12 May 2017	₹350 million (US$5.4 million)	₹99.3 million (US$1.5 million)
Total		₹760 million (US$7.9 million) Three films	₹1.09 billion (US$11 million) Three films

== Awards and nominations ==
=== Sarkar ===
- Filmfare Best Supporting Actor Award for Abhishek Bachchan
- Zee Cine Award Best Actor in a Supporting Role - Male for Abhishek Bachchan
- IIFA Award for Best Supporting Actor for Abhishek Bachchan

=== Sarkar Raj ===
==== Star Screen Awards ====
Nominated

- Screen Award for Best Film (2009)
- Screen Award for Best Director (2009)- Ram Gopal Varma
- Screen Award for Best Actor (2009)- Amitabh Bachchan
- Screen Award for Best Actor in a Supporting Role (2009)- Abhishek Bachchan
- Screen Award for Best Actor in a Negative Role (Male/Female) (2009)- Dilip Prabhawalkar
- Screen Award for Best Background Music (2009)- Amar Mohile

==== Stardust Awards ====
Nominated

- Stardust Award for Star of the Year – Male (2009)- Amitabh Bachchan
- Stardust Award for The New Menace (2009)- Rajesh Shringapure
- Stardust Award for Best Director (2009)- Ram Gopal Varma
- Stardust Award for Star of the Year – Male (2009)- Abhishek Bachchan
- Stardust Award for Star of the Year – Female (2009)- Aishwarya Rai

==== Filmfare Awards ====
Nominated

- Filmfare Award for Best Actor in Supporting Role (2009)- Abhishek Bachchan

==== IIFA Awards ====
Nominated

- IIFA Award for Best Actor in Supporting Role (2009)- Abhishek Bachchan

== Games ==
A promotional mobile video game based on the Sarkar Raj was released by Mauj Mobile in 2008.

== Remake ==
The Telugu sequel, titled Rowdy, in the backdrop of south Indian factionism, was released on 4 April 2014. Rowdy had also received equally positive reviews from critics but was a moderate commercial success, grossing approximately ₹8 crores in its full run.
