= P. Jaya Kumar =

Indian filmmaker and author

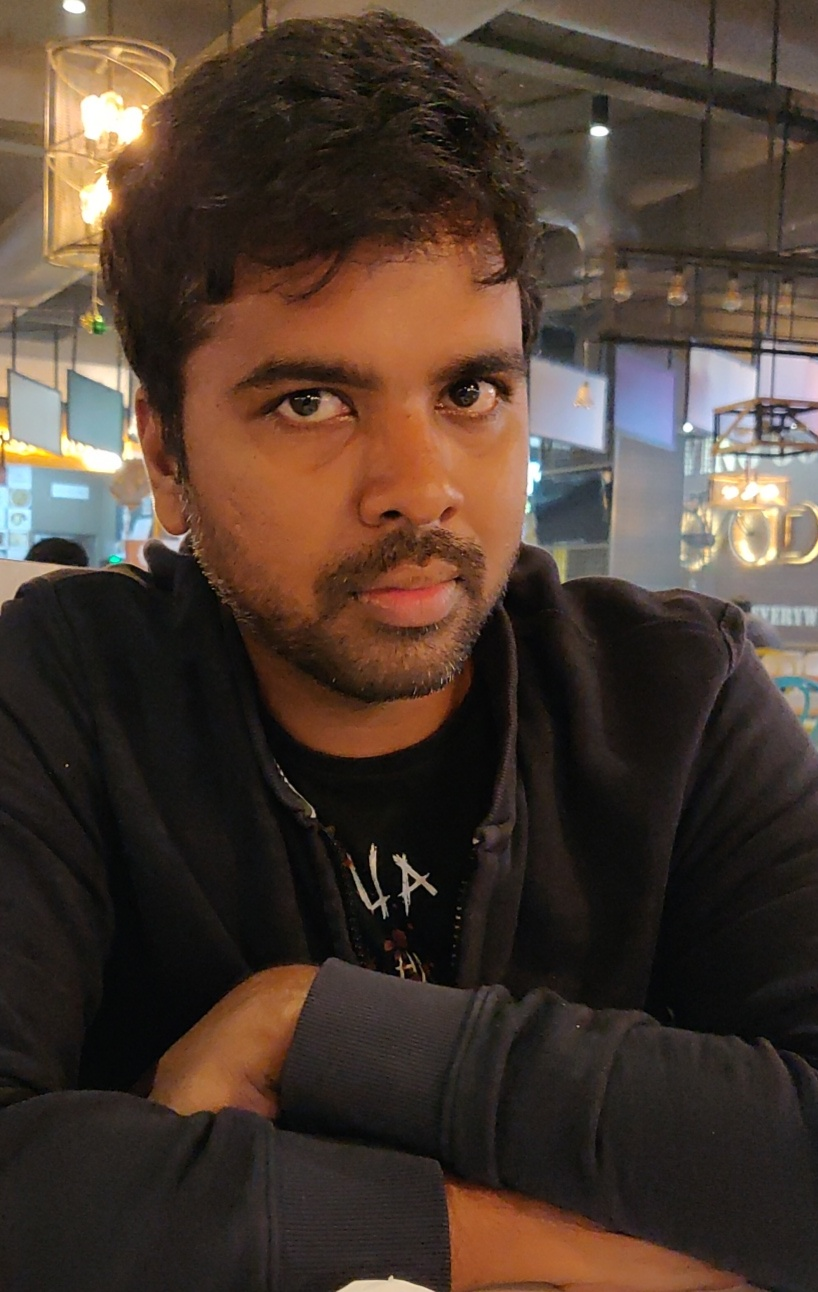
- Kumar in 2021
- Education: Jawaharlal Nehru University
- Occupations: director, screenwriter, author
- Years active: 2016–present
- Known for: Sarkar 3, Officer

P. Jaya Kumar is an Indian filmmaker, screenwriter and author working predominantly in Hindi and Telugu films. He debuted as the screenplay writer for Amitabh Bachchan's Bollywood film Sarkar 3 and Akkineni Nagarjuna's Telugu film Officer. He published multiple books of fiction which were later adapted by Ram Gopal Varma namely Meri Beti Sunny Leone Banna Chaahti Hain and God, Sex and Truth.

== Personal life ==
P. Jaya Kumar graduated as a Mechanical Engineer and later enrolled for a Masters in Sociology and a Master in Arts and Aesthetics from Jawaharlal Nehru University.

== Career ==
P. Jaya Kumar does not have any background in film industry. At the age of 24, when he was still pursuing his master's degree at JNU, Ram Gopal Varma who was impressed with him asked him to work as a creative consultant for many of his projects like Vangaveeti, Veerappan, Killing Veerappan; after which he got his break as the writer in 2017 for Sarkar 3. Ram Gopal Varma then went on to adapt P. Jaya Kumar's literary works namely Meri Beti Sunny Leone Banna Chaahti Hain and God, Sex and Truth. He worked as an executive script consultant for Sye Raa Narasimha Reddy starring Chiranjeevi, Amitabh Bachchan and Vijay Sethupathi.

== Filmography ==
Year	Title	Role	Notes
2016	Killing Veerappan	Creative consultant	
2016	Vangaveeti	Creative consultant	
2017	Sarkar 3	Screenplay Writer	
2017	Meri Beti Sunny Leone Banna Chaahti Hai	Story, Screenplay	
2017	God, Sex and Truth	Story and Dialogues from his novel	
2018	Officer	Story, Screenplay	
2019	Sye Raa Narasimha Reddy	Executive script consultant	

== Lawsuit ==
P. Jaya Kumar filed a lawsuit against Ram Gopal Varma in a civil court in India for plagiarizing and distorting his literary work and making an obscene film named God, Sex and Truth. Following his lawsuit of copyright claim, the trailer of God, Sex and Truth was taken down by Youtube.
