= Sarkar (2005 film) =

2005 Indian film by Ram Gopal Varma

- Theatrical release poster
- Directed by: Ram Gopal Varma
- Written by: Manish Gupta
- Produced by: Parag Sanghvi; Ram Gopal Varma
- Starring: Amitabh Bachchan; Abhishek Bachchan; Kay Kay Menon; Tanishaa; Katrina Kaif; Anupam Kher
- Cinematography: Amit Roy
- Edited by: Nitin Gupta; Amit Parmar
- Music by: Songs: Bapi–Tutul; Prasanna Shekhar; Score: Amar Mohile
- Production company: RGV Film Company
- Distributed by: KSS Limited; Sahara One Motion Pictures
- Release date: 1 July 2005
- Running time: 123 minutes
- Country: India
- Language: Hindi
- Budget: ₹140 million
- Box office: ₹393 million

Sarkar (transl. Leader) is a 2005 Indian Hindi-language political crime drama film directed by Ram Gopal Varma. The film stars Amitabh Bachchan, Abhishek Bachchan, Kay Kay Menon, Katrina Kaif, Tanishaa Mukerji, Supriya Pathak, Kota Srinivasa Rao, and Anupam Kher. It is the first installment of the Sarkar film series.

An unofficial remake of The Godfather; it spawned two sequels: Sarkar Raj (2008) and Sarkar 3 (2017). Sarkar was premiered at the New York Asian Film Festival and released in India on 1 July 2005. The film is preserved at the American Academy of Motion Pictures library.

== Plot ==
Subhash Nagre, who is known by his followers as Sarkar, lives in Mumbai. The opening scenes show a rape victim's father approaching Sarkar for justice (which the corrupt law and order system has failed to deliver), which Sarkar promptly establishes by having the rapist beaten up by his henchmen. His son Vishnu plays a sleazy producer who is more interested in the film actress Sapna than his wife Amrita. Sarkar's other, more upright son Shankar returns from the United States with his love Pooja after completing his education there. Pooja's doubts about Sarkar's image eventually cause Shankar, who firmly believes in his father's righteousness, to break up with her.

One day, a Dubai-based don, Rasheed, tries to strike a deal with Sarkar; he promptly refuses on moral grounds and also forbids him from doing it himself. Rasheed tries to eliminate Sarkar's supremacy with the help of Selvar Mani, Sarkar's former associate, MLA Vishram Bhagat, and Swami Virendra. Meanwhile, they trap Sarkar by assassinating a righteous, upright, Ahinsa political leader and an outspoken critic of Sarkar, Motilal Khurana, and frame Sarkar for the murder. Everyone, including Vishnu, believes that Sarkar is guilty, but Shankar has deep faith in his father. Sarkar is arrested and imprisoned. Shankar now takes over the position of Sarkar temporarily. On learning of a plot to murder his father in prison, he approaches the police commissioner and asks him to arrange stronger security for his father, only for the commissioner to mock Shankar and his father beside not providing protection. Shankar gets a feeling that the police commissioner wants Sarkar to get murdered. Shankar and Khansaab, one of Sarkar's men, try to ask Mani for help to prevent possible murder, but Mani ultimately betrays them when he reveals that he is in an alliance with Rasheed. Rasheed prepares to kill Shankar and Khansaab, but only Khansaab is killed when he decides to sacrifice himself for Shankar. By the time Shankar reaches the prison and appropriate action is taken, the attempt on Sarkar's life is already made. Sarkar is later acquitted. He remains bedridden as Shankar takes on Sarkar's enemies.

Meanwhile, Mani, Swami, Vishram, and Rasheed try to convince Vishnu to murder Sarkar. Vishnu was previously expelled from Sarkar's house because he had murdered the actor who was having an affair with Sapna. Vishnu returns home pretending to have repented. When he approaches Sarkar in the dark of the night with the intent of murdering him, Shankar foils his plan and later kills him. Shankar eliminates Rasheed, Vishram, and Selvar Mani. He also succeeds in making Swami his puppet. Shankar has also realised that Chief Minister Madan Rathod was really behind everything; Rasheed and everyone else were merely pawns. This results in legal action against Rathod. The closing scenes show a woman approaching Shankar for justice to a fake encounter of her husband by the police and calling Shankar the Sarkar, while Subhash is busy with family.

== Cast ==
- Amitabh Bachchan as Subhash Nagre alias "Sarkar"
- Abhishek Bachchan as Shankar Nagre, Sarkar's younger son
- Kay Kay Menon as Vishnu Nagre, Sarkar's elder son
- Supriya Pathak as Pushpa Nagre, Sarkar's wife
- Katrina Kaif as Pooja Chauhan, Shankar's girlfriend (voice dubbed by Mona Ghosh Shetty)
- Tanishaa as Avantika, Shankar's wife
- Rukhsar Rehman as Amrita Nagre, Vishnu's wife
- Anupam Kher as Motilal Khurana
- Kota Srinivasa Rao as Selvar Mani
- Zakir Hussain as Rashid
- Raju Mavani as MLA Vishram Bhagat
- Jeeva as Virendra Swami
- Deepak Shirke as CM Madan Rathod, Sarkar's best friend and confidant
- Anant Jog as Police Commissioner
- Ishrat Ali as Bochya
- Saurabh Dubey as Pooja's father
- Ravi Kale as Chander, Sarkar's right-hand man
- Virendra Saxena as Girl's father
- Carran Kapoor as a hero in Vishnu's film
- Nisha Kothari as a heroine in Vishnu's film
- Narendra Sachar as IG Police
- Mangal Kenkre as Shoba
- Shivam Shetty as Bhushan
- Chintan Atul Shah as Shivaji Nagre alias "Cheeku", Vishnu's son and Sarkar's grandson

== Production ==
Sarkar's director Ram Gopal Varma was deeply influenced by the Francis Ford Coppola's Hollywood classic The Godfather (1972), which he mentions in the opening credits of the film. He changed the film's setting to modern-day Mumbai.

== Soundtrack ==
Sarkar

Soundtrack album by Bapi–Tutul and Prasanna Shekhar
- Released: 27 June 2005
- Genre: Feature film soundtrack
- Length: 33:35
- Language: Hindi
- Label: T-Series

The soundtrack was composed by Bapi–Tutul and Prasanna Shekhar with lyrics written by Sandeep Nath.

Tracklist
No.	Title	Singer(s)	Length
1.	"Deen Bandhu"	Reeta Ganguly	4:36
2.	"Deen Bandhu Theme"		4:24
3.	"Govinda – Song"	Amitabh Bachchan, Kailash Kher, Bapi, Tutul	2:59
4.	"Govinda – Trance"	Bapi, Tutul, Janaki	3:25
5.	"Jitni Oochaeeyan"	Krishna, Farhad	3:27
6.	"Mujhe Jo Sahi Lagta Hai"	Amitabh Bachchan, Kailash Kher	3:03
7.	"Sam Dam Bhed"	Kailash Kher	3:29
8.	"Shaher, Shaher Ke Hazaron Sawal"	Kailash Kher	3:54
9.	"The Govinda Omen"	Choir	1:58
10.	"The Want For Power"	Krishna, Farhad, Prasana Shekhar	2:04

== Reception ==
Raja Sen of Rediff said that the film "had the potential to be great. It turns out to be passable." Taran Adarsh of Bollywood Hungama praised the movie saying that, "Sarkar is without doubt an interesting film. The story, its execution, the performances, the drama… The outcome leaves you spellbound." but criticized the slow pacing of the film and gave it a rating of 3.5 out of 5. William Thomas of Empire Online gave the film a rating of 4 out of 5 saying that, "Constructed with flair and crackling with intelligence, this is one of the most edgiest and grittiest releases to come out of Bollywood in years."

== Accolades ==
Award (Note: Awards, festivals and organizations are in alphabetical order.)	Date of ceremony (Note: Date is linked to the article about the awards held that year, wherever possible.)	Category	Recipient(s)	Result	Ref.
Bollywood Movie Awards	10 June 2006	Best Film	Sarkar – Parag Sanghvi, Varun Sanghvi	Nominated	
Bollywood Movie Awards	10 June 2006	Best Director	Ram Gopal Varma	Nominated	
Bollywood Movie Awards	10 June 2006	Best Supporting Actor	Abhishek Bachchan	Nominated	
Bollywood Movie Awards	10 June 2006	Best Villain	Kay Kay Menon	Nominated	
Bollywood Movie Awards	10 June 2006	Best Villain	Zakir Hussain	Nominated	
Bollywood Movie Awards	10 June 2006	Best Editing	Nitin Gupta, Amit Parmar	Nominated	
Filmfare Awards	25 February 2006	Best Director	Ram Gopal Varma	Nominated	
Filmfare Awards	25 February 2006	Best Actor	Amitabh Bachchan	Nominated	
Filmfare Awards	25 February 2006	Best Supporting Actor	Abhishek Bachchan	Won	
Filmfare Awards	25 February 2006	Best Performance in a Negative Role	Kay Kay Menon	Nominated	
International Indian Film Academy Awards	15–17 June 2006	Best Actor	Amitabh Bachchan	Nominated	
International Indian Film Academy Awards	15–17 June 2006	Best Supporting Actor	Abhishek Bachchan	Won	
Producers Guild Film Awards	21 January 2006	Best Editing	Nitin Gupta	Won	
Screen Awards	11 January 2006	Best Director	Ram Gopal Varma	Nominated	
Screen Awards	11 January 2006	Best Supporting Actor	Abhishek Bachchan	Nominated	
Screen Awards	11 January 2006	Best Actor in a Negative Role	Kay Kay Menon	Nominated	
Screen Awards	11 January 2006	Best Background Music	Amar Mohile	Nominated	
Screen Awards	11 January 2006	Best Editing	Nitin Gupta, Amit Parmar	Nominated	
Screen Awards	11 January 2006	Best Sound	Kunal Mehta, Parikshit Lalwani	Nominated	
Zee Cine Awards	4 March 2006	Best Film	Sarkar – Ram Gopal Varma	Nominated	
Zee Cine Awards	4 March 2006	Best Director	Ram Gopal Varma	Nominated	
Zee Cine Awards	4 March 2006	Best Screenplay	Ram Gopal Varma	Nominated	
Zee Cine Awards	4 March 2006	Best Actor in a Supporting Role – Male	Abhishek Bachchan	Won	
Zee Cine Awards	4 March 2006	Best Performance in a Negative Role	Kay Kay Menon	Nominated	
Zee Cine Awards	4 March 2006	Most Promising Debut – Female	Katrina Kaif	Nominated	
Zee Cine Awards	4 March 2006	Best Background Score	Amar Mohile	Nominated	
Zee Cine Awards	4 March 2006	Best Editing	Nitin Gupta, Amit Parmar	Nominated	
Zee Cine Awards	4 March 2006	Best Sound	Kunal Mehta, Parikshit Lalwani	Nominated	

== Remake ==
A Telugu remake, titled Rowdy, was made replacing the background of Marathi politics with that of Rayalaseema Factionism. Veteran actor Mohan Babu reprised the role portrayed by Amitabh Bachchan, while his son, Vishnu Manchu, reprised the role played by Abhishek Bachchan. Rowdy released on 4 April 2014 to positive reviews from critics, but was a moderate commercial success, grossing approximately ₹8 crores in its theatrical run.

== Sequels ==
A sequel titled Sarkar Raj was released on 6 June 2008 with Amitabh Bachchan, Abhishek Bachchan (who reprise their roles from the original) with Aishwarya Rai Bachchan. Supriya Pathak, Tanishaa Mukerji and Ravi Kale also reprised in their respective roles from Sarkar. The film released on 6 June 2008,

Another sequel Sarkar 3 was,released on 12 May 2017.

== See also ==
- The Godfather (1972) by Francis Ford Coppola from which this Sarkar's story and lead characters are adapted and have similarities.
