= Beautiful (2020 film) =

Beautiful: An Ode to Rangeela
- Promotional release poster in Telugu
- Directed by: Agastya Manju
- Written by: K. K. Binojee
- Screenplay by: Agastya Manju
- Story by: Agastya Manju
- Produced by: Naresh Kumar T Sridhar T. Ram Gopal Varma (presenter)
- Starring: Naina Ganguly; K. K. Binojee; Parth Suri
- Cinematography: Agastya Manju
- Edited by: Abhishek Ojha
- Music by: Ravi Shankar
- Production company: A Tiger / Company Production
- Release date: 1 January 2020
- Running time: 123 minutes
- Country: India
- Language: Hindi

Beautiful: An Ode to Rangeela is a 2020 Indian Hindi-language romantic drama film directed by Agastya Manju, and produced by Naresh Kumar T. The film stars Naina Ganguly, K. K. Binojee, and Parth Suri in pivotal roles. It was released on 1 January 2020, and simultaneously dubbed into Telugu language.

== Premise ==
The film is an ode to Ram Gopal Varma's classic Rangeela. The story revolves around a poor mechanic who falls in love with an aspiring actress who becomes popular.

== Cast ==
- Naina Ganguly
- K. K. Binojee
- Parth Suri
