= Dhahanam =

- Genre: Action; Crime
- Written by: Kalyan Raghav
- Directed by: Agasthya Manju
- Starring: Isha Koppikar; Naina Ganguly; Sayaji Shinde; Pradeep Rawat; Ravi Kale
- Music by: Anand
- Composer: Manish Thakur
- Country of origin: India
- Original language: Telugu
- No. of seasons: 1
- No. of episodes: 7

Production
- Executive producer: Gautam Talwar
- Producer: Ram Gopal Varma
- Cinematography: V. Malhar Bhatt Joshi
- Camera setup: Multi-camera
- Running time: 25-35 minutes
- Production company: People Media Factory

Original release
- Network: MX Player
- Release: 14 April 2022 – present

Dhahanam (Telegu: దహనం) is a 2022 Telugu language streaming television series written by Kalyan Raghav, produced by Ram Gopal Varma and directed by Agasthya Manju. It stars Abhishek Duhan, Ashwat Kanth, Abhilash Chaudhary, Isha Koppikar, Kancharapalem Kishore, Naina Ganguly, Parvathy Arun, Pradeep Rawat and others.

== Cast ==
- Isha Koppikar as Anjana Sinha
- Naina Ganguly as Pavani
- Parvathy Arun as Sunitha
- Abhishek Duhan as Hari
- Ravi Kale as Suresh
- Abhilash Chaudhary as Obul Reddy
- Kancharapalem Kishore as Chaman
- Sayaji Shinde as Chenna Reddy
- Pradeep Rawat as MLA Narayana Reddy
- Vinod Anand as Sriramulaiah
- Zakir Hussain as Kabir
- Kailash Pal as Siddappa
- Sunil Sharma as Ramana Reddy
- Sana as Krishnaveni
- Rakhi as Narayanaddmma
- Sanjay Raichura as DGP
- Aalwin as Raghunath Reddy
- Naveen Jayan as Bhairagi
- Giridhar as Sai
- Ravi Mallepati as Seenaiah
- Sandeep Boreddy as Paidithali
- Vinod as Chengal Rayadu
- Nagaraj as Chowdappa

== Production ==
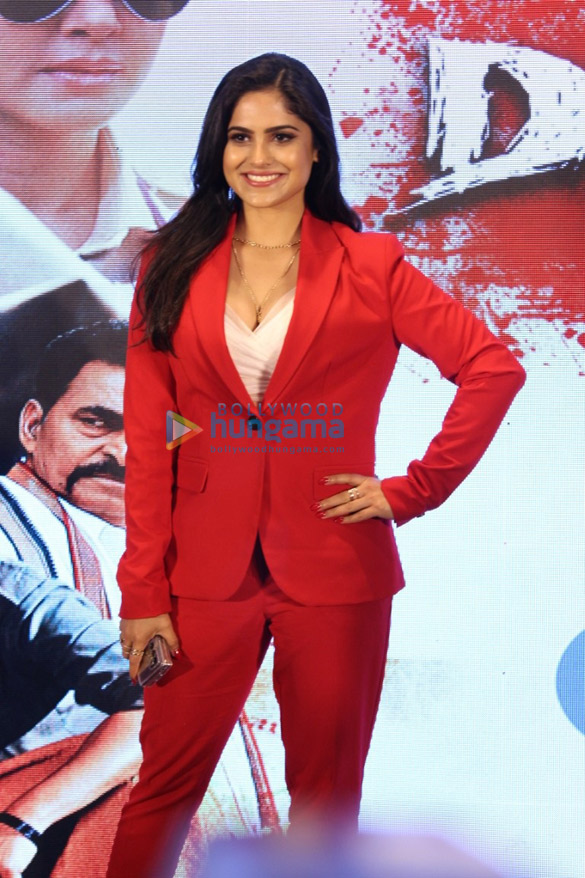
Naina Ganguly at the promotional event of Dhahanam

The series was announced by Ram Gopal Varma in early April 2022. The series was shot during the COVID-19 pandemic in locations of Andhra Pradesh.

The trailer of the series was unveiled in April 2022.

== Release ==
Dhahanam was released on 14 April 2022 with a dubbed version in Tamil and Hindi.

== Critical reception ==
Ameen Fatima of Leisurebyte wrote "The end of the series doesn’t feel satisfactory or rather incomplete". OTTPlay wrote "Agasthya Manju's direction comes as a disappointment with loosely executed sequences." Binged staff wrote "The gruesome killings, the conversations etc., are all typical Ram Gopal Varma."

The series was also reviewed by Hindustan Times Telegu, NTV and Sakshi.
