= Dangerous (2022 film) =

- Promotional release poster
- Directed by: Ram Gopal Varma
- Written by: Ram Gopal Varma
- Produced by: Natti Kumar
- Starring: Naina Ganguly; Apsara Rani; Rajpal Yadav
- Cinematography: V. Malharbhatt Joshi
- Edited by: Ram Gopal Varma
- Music by: Paul Praveen Kumar
- Production companies: A Company Production; Tricky Media; Artsee Media
- Distributed by: Bheemavaram Talkies; Rimpy Arts
- Release date: 9 December 2022
- Running time: 92 minutes
- Country: India
- Language: Hindi

Dangerous is a 2022 Indian Hindi language film directed by Ram Gopal Varma and produced by Natti Kumar. The film stars Naina Ganguly, Apsara Rani, and Rajpal Yadav in pivotal roles. It was released on 9 December 2022, and was dubbed into Telugu, Tamil, Kannada, Malayalam languages.

== Premise ==
Billed as India's first lesbian crime drama, the film follows two lesbian women's journey to love and life in the backdrop of a criminal nexus.

== Cast ==
- Naina Ganguly
- Apsara Rani
- Rajpal Yadav
- Mithun Purandare as Abusive Husband
- Gordhan Singh as Kookie
