= D Company (2021 film) =

2021 Indian film

- Promotional poster
- Directed by: Ram Gopal Varma
- Written by: Nitin Raikwar (Lyrics)
- Screenplay by: Ram Gopal Varma; Hareesh M Kotian
- Story by: Ram Gopal Varma
- Produced by: Sagar Machanuru
- Starring: Ashwat Kanth; Shaleen Malhotra; Rudr Kanth; Naina Ganguly; Irra Mor; Apsara Rani; Mursaleen Qureshi; Pranay Dixit; Sandeep Bose; Abhilash Chaudhary
- Cinematography: V. Malhar Bhatt Joshi
- Edited by: Pratap Kumar Sanga (Bobby)
- Music by: Paul Praveen
- Production company: Spark Productions
- Distributed by: Spark Productions; A Company Production
- Release date: 21 March 2021
- Running time: 90 minutes
- Country: India
- Language: Hindi

D Company is a 2021 Indian Hindi language docudrama film, written and directed by Ram Gopal Varma. It was produced by Sagar Machanuru of Spark Production. The film was theatrically released on March 21, 2021, as a prelude to Ram Gopal Varma's D Company web series, also produced by Spark OTT.

The web series and film make up the fifth and sixth installments of the Gangster franchise. They are unrelated to the original trilogy and Satya 2.

== Premise ==
The film chronicles the events leading to Dawood Ibrahim's rise and subsequent formation of the "D" company - an organized crime syndicate running outside India's borders.

== Cast ==
- Ashwat Kanth as Dawood Ibrahim
- Naina Ganguly as Sujatha
- Shaleen Malhotra as Manya Surve
- Rudr Kanth as Saabir Ibrahim
- Pranay Dixit as Chota Shakeel
- Abhilash Chaudhary as Alamzeb
- Gaurav Daagar as Vishal Cheeta
- Rocky Mahajan as Samad Khan
- Irra Mor as Chitra
- Mursaleem Qureshi as Jhoni Akhawat
- Anshu Rajput as Haseena
- Heramb Tripathi as Aamir Zada
- Vikas Rao as Javed
- Sandeep Bose
- Apsara Rani (Special appearance in the song "Khatham")
