= Amma Rajyam Lo Kadapa Biddalu =

Indian film directed by Ram Gopal Varma

- Theatrical release poster
- Directed by: Siddartha Thatolu; Ram Gopal Varma
- Written by: Ram Gopal Varma; Karun Venkat
- Produced by: Ajay Mysore
- Starring: Ajmal Ameer; Dhananjay Prabhune; Brahmanandam; Ali
- Cinematography: Jagadeesh Cheekati
- Edited by: Anwar Ali
- Music by: Ravi Shankar
- Production companies: TigerProduction; Ajay Mysore Productions
- Release date: 12 December 2019
- Running time: 133 minutes
- Country: India
- Language: Telugu

Amma Rajyam Lo Kadapa Biddalu (transl. Sons of Kadapa in the mother's kingdom), originally titled Kamma Rajyam Lo Kadapa Reddlu (transl. The Reddys of Kadapa in the Kamma kingdom), is a 2019 Indian Telugu-language political satire film directed by Siddartha Thatolu and Ram Gopal Varma and produced by Ajay Mysore. The film stars Ajmal Ameer, Dhananjay Prabhune, Brahmanandam, and Ali.

== Premise ==
The plot depicts the political rivalry between the two dominant castes of Andhra Pradesh, namely, Reddy and Kamma, at the onset of 2019 Legislative Assembly election.

== Cast ==
- Ajmal Ameer as V. S. Jagannnath Reddy, (based on Y. S. Jaganmohan Reddy)
- Dhananjay Prabhune as Babu, (based on N. Chandrababu Naidu)
- Brahmanandam as Rambabu, driver of Babu
- Ali as speaker Pammineni Ram (based on Thammineni Seetharam)
- Srikanth Iyyengar as politician Dayaneni Rama (based on Devineni Uma)
- K. V. Dheeraj as Aakash Babu, Babu's son (based on Nara Lokesh)
- Nidhi Kushalappa as Ramani, Aakash's wife (based on Nara Brahmani)
- Kathi Mahesh as Special officer
- Swapna as Police Inspector
- Dhanraj as Gangaveeti Bhavani (based on Jr. Vangaveeti Mohana Ranga)
- Rakesh Bhavsar as Paul (based on K. A. Paul)
- Jaffar Babu as himself
- Ram Gopal Varma as himself
- Prudhvi Raj in a cameo appearance as Political expert Durgeswar (based on Professor K. Nageshwar)

== Soundtrack ==
Kamma Rajyam Lo Kadapa Reddlu

Soundtrack album by Ravi Shankar
- Released: 2019
- Recorded: 2019
- Genre: Feature film soundtrack
- Length: 27:17
- Producer: Ravi Shankar

Ravi Shankar chronology
Bhairava Geetha (2018)	Kamma Rajyam Lo Kadapa Reddlu (2019)	Beautiful (2019)

Music is composed by Ravi Shankar. The song "Pappu Laanti Abbayi" is based on "Chukkalanti Ammayi" from Abhinandana (1988).

Track list
No.	Title	Lyrics	Singer(s)	Length
1.	"Kamma Rajyam Lo Kadapa Reddlu"	Sirasri	Ravi Shankar	4:25
2.	"Caste Feeling"	Sirasri	Ram Gopal Varma / RGV	7:05
3.	"Babu Champesthaadu"	Sirasri	Ram Gopal Varma / RGV	4:44
4.	"Nene KA Paul"	Sirasri	Ravi Shankar	3:30
5.	"Pappu Laanti Abbayi"	Sirasri		2:47
6.	"Dhandam"	Sirasri	Hamsika Iyer, Sakshi holkar, Harman Nazim	3:45
Total length:				27:17

== Release ==
The film, originally titled Kamma Rajyam Lo Kadapa Reddlu, was scheduled to release on 29 November 2019, but postponed due to censor issue and Telangana High Court has put a stay to change the title of the film. After censor clearance Ram Gopal Varma announced the release date as 12 December 2019.

=== Marketing ===
A first look poster was released on 7 September 2019. Another poster was released on 25 October 2019 revealing the characters and announcing the trailer release date and time. The trailer was released on the occasion of Diwali, 27 October 2019.

== Reception ==
The Times of India gave 1.5 of 5 stars and stated, "Be it movies or politics, the only thing people of this country want is entertainment,” says RGV in a grand statement, "but where is the entertainment in ARKB, we ask? All we see is a film that's a hot mess of random scenes stitched together." The Hans India gave 2 of 5 stars and stated, "The movie doesn't have a solid story which will be the biggest minus point of this film. Director Siddharth Thatholu along with the supervision of Ram Gopal Varma focused more on the unnecessary elevations for the hero and the slow-paced narration will test the patience of the audience. The performances are decent but the story execution is very poor. The screenplay is also terrible and most of the scenes don't have any connection. Also, the violence and the bloodshed in the film will irk some sections of the audience. Especially, the second half is extremely slow and some of the scenes are just logicless".
