= Meri Beti Sunny Leone Banna Chaahti Hai =

2017 Indian film

- Directed by: Ram Gopal Varma
- Written by: P. Jaya Kumar
- Produced by: Ram Gopal Varma
- Starring: Naina Ganguly; Makrand Deshpande; Divya Jagdale
- Cinematography: Amol Rathod
- Release date: 5 June 2017
- Running time: 11 minute 29 seconds
- Country: India
- Language: Hindi

Meri Beti Sunny Leone Banna Chaahti Hai (transl. My daughter wants to be Sunny Leone) is a 2017 Indian Hindi-language short film which was directed and produced by Ram Gopal Verma. The film stars Naina Ganguly, Makrand Deshpande and Divya Jagdale.

Ram Gopal Verma made his debut in the short film arena with this film. This short film is the debut short film of Naina Ganguly too in her lead role. It was released on 5 June 2017 on YouTube.

== Plot ==
This film depicted a living room conversation of a family where the family's daughter (Naina Ganguly) told her father (Makrand Deshpande) and mother (Divya Jagdale) about her intention to become a porn star like Sunny Leone. Later, they went through an argument over sexuality, the porn business, women's bodies and society. At the end of their argument the daughter did not change her intention. She told her mother that if she listened her words carefully and understood those a little bit, she would be happy as her daughter wanted to become a porn star like Sunny Leone. She also added that if she fully understood her words she would regret for not becoming a porn star like Sunny Leone.

== Cast ==
- Naina Ganguly as daughter
- Makrand Deshpande as father
- Divya Jagdale as mother

== Release ==
Meri Beti Sunny Leone Banna Chaahti Hai was released on YouTube on 5 June 2017.

== Reception ==
Meri Beti Sunny Leone Banna Chaahti Hai crossed 1.5 million views on YouTube in 15 hours. Daily News and Analysis criticised the film as it is not a usual matter to say the word "porn star" in front of parents on a middle-class family let alone saying intention to become a porn star. It also criticised the acting of Naina Ganguly. In spite of criticism it praised the stigma and double standard attached to a woman's sexuality, her suppression under the name of "what will people say" and demonising her right to choose which was depicted in the conversation. In the review of Firstpost it described that the film reflected "shameless opportunism". It also criticised the conversation of the film.
