= Tanishaa =

Indian actress (born 1978)

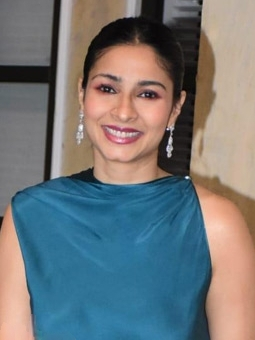
- Mukerji in 2024
- Born: 3 March 1978 (age 48); Mumbai, Maharashtra, India
- Occupation: Actress
- Years active: 2003–present
- Parent(s): Shomu Mukherjee; Tanuja Samarth
- Relatives: Mukherjee-Samarth family

Tanishaa S Mukerji (born 3 March 1978), known mononymously as Tanishaa, is an Indian actress known for her works in Hindi films and reality television shows. A member of the Mukherjee-Samarth family, daughter of filmmaker Shomu Mukherjee and actress Tanuja, and the younger sister of actress Kajol.

Mukherji made her debut with the slasher film Sssshhh... in 2003 and had her first success with the political crime thriller film Sarkar, and its sequel Sarkar Raj in which she had a supporting role. This was followed by a career decline, In 2013, she made her television debut as a contestant in Colors TV's reality show Bigg Boss 7, where she finished as first runner-up.

== Early life and family ==
Mukerji was born in Mumbai on 3 March 1978, into the family of Shomu Mukherjee, a Bengali Hindu film director and his Marathi wife, actress Tanuja, and is the younger sister of Bollywood actress Kajol, who is married to actor Ajay Devgn. She is the first cousin of film director Ayan Mukherjee and second cousin of actress Rani Mukherji.

Mukherji was in a relationship with her Bigg Boss 7 housemate, Armaan Kohli for a year before they broke up in October 2014.

== Career ==
=== Debut with commercial failures and career decline (2003–2008) ===
Mukherji got her first break in Bollywood with the thriller slasher film, Sssshhh... opposite Karan Nath and Dino Morea. It received poor reviews Taran Adarsh from Bollywood Hungama called, "Sssshhh? a weak screenplay with excessive length and most importantly, a half-baked climax" and wrote, "Mukerji needs to work on her dialogue delivery along with screen appearance". The film was a critical and commercial failure. Her next release the romantic comedy film Popcorn Khao! Mast Ho Jao (2004) received negative reviews from critics, upon its premiere and performed poorly at the box office. In 2005, she starred in the romantic comedy film Neal 'n' Nikki co-starring Uday Chopra under the banner of Yash Raj Films. The film was released on 9 December 2005 to negative reviews from critics and was a commercial failure at the box office. A reviewer wrote, "Neal 'n' Nikki concentrates more on skin show than a sound story terrible letdown in terms of content".

The same year, she appeared in a supporting role of Avantika in the political crime thriller film Sarkar alongside an ensemble cast. The film released on 1 July 2005, with positive reviews and became commercially successful. Her last release in 2005 was the war film Tango Charlie opposite Bobby Deol. This was her foirth consecutive box office failure. After a two year hiatus in 2007, she made her Tamil film debut with the romantic musical film Unnale Unnale, opposite Vinay Rai. The film was successful at the box office and received positive reviews for its storyline and performances. It earned her a nomination for Best Debut Female at the Vijay Awards. In 2008, she appeared in the comedy film One Two Three opposite Upen Patel. This too had an unsuccessful run at the box office. The same year, she reprised her role in the second installment of Sarkar film series, Sarkar Raj. The sequel also became critical and commercial success.

=== Bigg Boss and further work (2013–present) ===
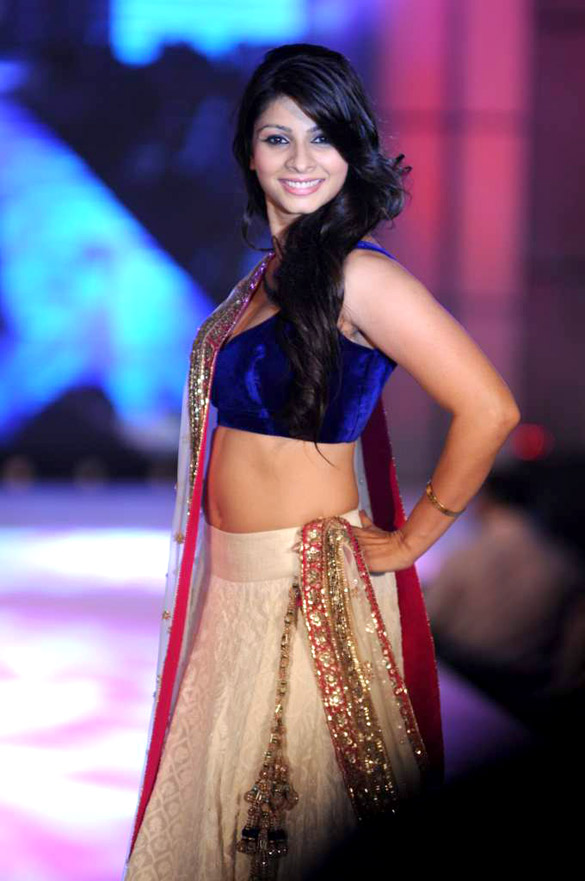
Mukerji walks for Manish Malhotra & Shaina NC's show for CPAA in 2012

She made her comeback by participating in the television reality show Bigg Boss 7 and became the first runner-up. She was later seen as one of the judges in the stand-up comedy show Gangs of Haseepur. In 2016, she participated in Fear Factor: Khatron Ke Khiladi 7 and became a finalist. She participated as a contestant on Sony TV's dance reality show Jhalak Dikhhla Jaa 11 where she finished in 13th place.

== Filmography ==
=== Films ===
- All films are in Hindi unless otherwise noted

| Year | Title | Role | Notes |
|---|---|---|---|
| 2003 | Sssshhh... | Mahek Gujral | |
| 2004 | Popcorn Khao! Mast Ho Jao | Tanya Sharma | |
| 2005 | Neal 'n' Nikki | Nikita 'Nikki' Bakshi | |
| 2005 | Sarkar | Avantika | |
| 2005 | Tango Charlie | Lachchi Narayan / Lachchi Tarun Chauhan | |
| 2007 | Unnale Unnale | Deepika | Tamil film |
| 2008 | One Two Three | Chandni | |
| 2008 | Kantri | Pyaasi Priya | Telugu film |
| 2008 | Sarkar Raj | Avantika | |
| 2010 | Tum Milo Toh Sahi | Herself | Special appearance |
| 2011 | Be Careful | Anjali | |
| 2011 | Chop | Emily Reed | English film |
| 2016 | Anna | Shikha | |
| 2021 | Code Name Abdul | Salma | |
| 2024 | Luv You Shankar | Geeta | |
| 2026 | Veer Murarbaji | TBA | Marathi-Hindi film |

=== Television ===
| Year | Title | Role | Notes | Ref. |
|---|---|---|---|---|
| 2013 | Bigg Boss 7 | Contestant | 1st runner-up | |
| 2014 | Gangs of Haseepur | Judge | | |
| 2016 | Fear Factor: Khatron Ke Khiladi 7 | Contestant | 4th place | |
| 2023 | Jhalak Dikhhla Jaa 11 | Contestant | 13th place | |

== See also ==
- List of Indian film actresses
