= Code Name Abdul =

2021 spy-thriller film by Eshwar Gunturu

- Theatrical release poster
- Directed by: Eshwar Gunturu
- Written by: Eshwar Gunturu
- Screenplay by: Eshwar Gunturu
- Story by: Eshwar Gunturu
- Produced by: Hemangi Shah
- Starring: Tanishaa; Akku Kulhari; Ashok Chaudhary; Khatera Hakimi; Sumend Wankhade; Anshuman Sharma
- Cinematography: Ajay Loka
- Music by: Amar Mohile
- Production companies: Avantika Productions; A Mise en Scene Films Production
- Release dates: 17 December 2017 (SAIFF); 10 December 2021 (India, USA)
- Running time: 1 hour 54 minutes
- Countries: India, USA
- Language: Hindi

Code Name Abdul is a 2017 Indian Hindi-language spy thriller film directed by Eshwar Gunturu. The film stars Kajol's sister Tanishaa in the lead role. The film revolves around a secret mission given to RAW. The film theatrically released on 10 December 2021.

== Cast ==
The film features the following casts

- Tanishaa as Salma
- Ashok Chaudhry as Stalin
- Khatera Hakimi as Mehek
- Sumend Wankhade as Ajay
- Anshuman Sharma as Anwar
- Deepak Ravella as Srinivas
- Anil Sachdeva as Khalid
- Bharat Tiwari as Ali Baksh
- Vikram Singh as Sahab
- Deepen Shah as Major
- Jiten Mehta as Tracker
- Rome Keshav Chopra as Frank
- Adriano Esposito as Jimmy
- Aman Singh Mukar as Nasha
- Ashish Mathur as Seth
- Madhukar Reddy as Jamal
- Akku Kulhari as Johny

== Marketing ==
The first look poster of the movie was released on 14 September 2019 that featured an image of Tanishaa and the other star-cast in black and white scrapbook style.
