= Mia Malkova =

American pornographic film actress (born 1992)

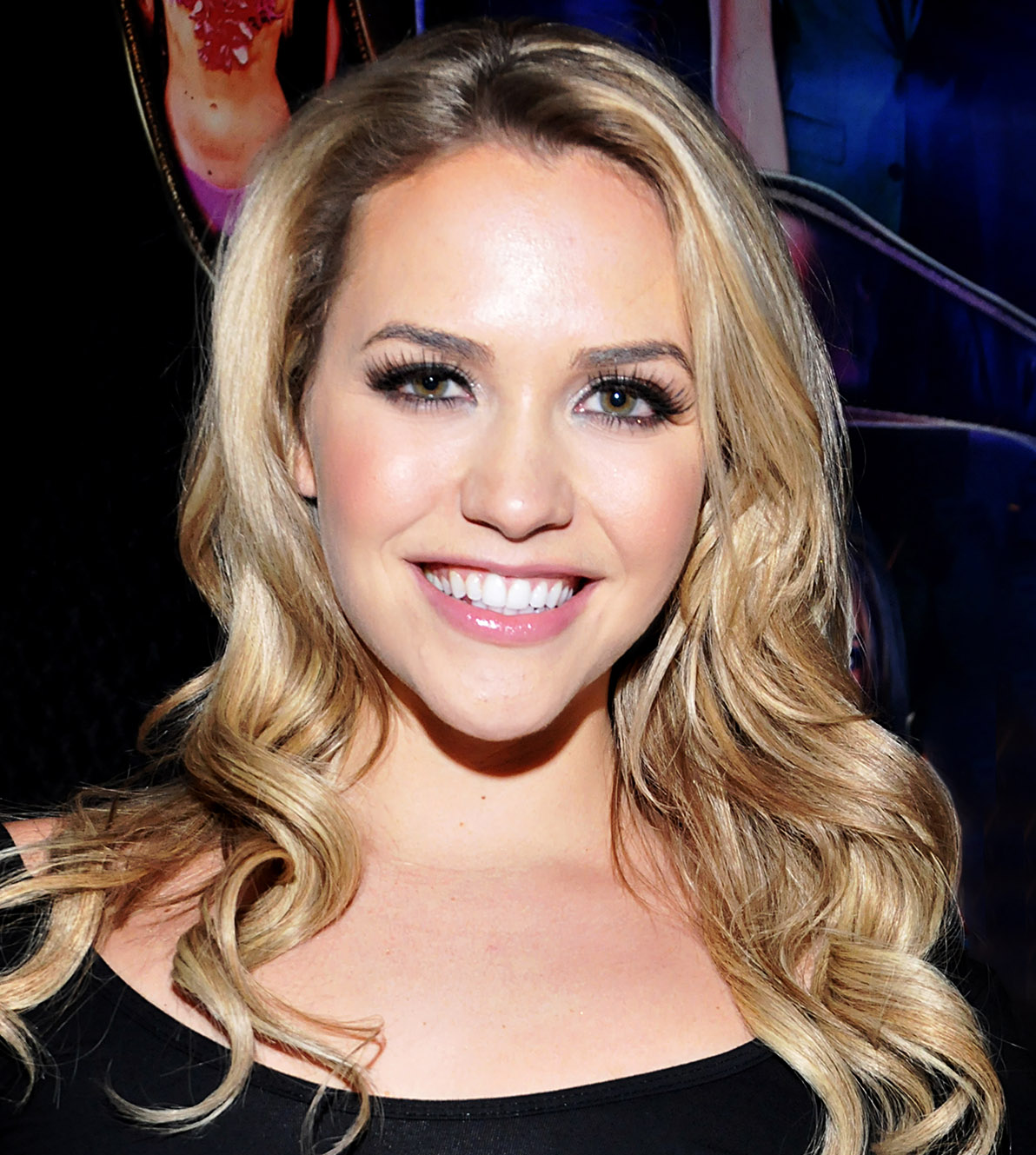
- Malkova in 2016
- Born: July 1, 1992 (age 34)
- Occupations: Pornographic film actress; livestreamer
- Years active: 2012–2021 (porn actress); 2022–present (online content creator)

Mia Malkova (born July 1, 1992) is an American pornographic film actress and video game livestreamer. She has won various porn industry awards, including the 2014 AVN Award for Best New Starlet and the 2017 XBIZ Award for Best Actress. She appeared in an Indian pornographic short monologue documentary and an Indian erotic thriller film, both directed by Ram Gopal Varma. In 2022, she began livestreaming video games on Twitch. Malkova has been described as one of the most popular porn actresses in the world.

== Career ==
Malkova was "Twistys Treat of the Month" in December 2012 and was "Twistys Treat of the Year" in 2013. She was a contract performer for Twistys' parent company, Aylo, during that time. When the contract lapsed in 2014, she signed with Hard X to exclusively perform scenes with men, while being allowed to perform scenes without men with other companies. Malkova was the October 2016 Penthouse Pet of the Month.

Malkova is the focus of Ram Gopal Varma's short monologue documentary God, Sex and Truth (2018), which examines female sexuality and beauty. In a 2018 interview, Malkova said she entered the porn industry because she loves sex, and she feels the industry is the best and safest place to explore sex in all its forms. In December 2019, she and the Hearthstone streamer Trump released a duet of "A Whole New World".

In 2020, Malkova appeared in music videos for the songs "Still Be Friends" by G-Eazy and "Wondering Tonight" by Ninja Sex Party. The same year, she starred in Varma's erotic thriller Climax. In January 2022, she co-hosted the 39th AVN Awards with fellow porn performer Mighty Emelia.

During the early 2020s, Malkova started gaining attention as a Twitch streamer and as an OnlyFans content creator. As of March 2022, she has more than 634,000 followers on Twitch.

== Personal life ==
Malkova's hometown is Palm Springs, California. Her brother, Justin Hunt, is also a porn actor. Malkova is an atheist.

== Filmography ==
=== Films ===
Year	Title	Role	Notes	Refs.
2018	God, Sex and Truth	Herself	Short film	
2020	Climax	Diane	Movie	

== Awards and nominations ==
Year	Award	Category	Work	Result	Ref(s)
2013	Twistys	Treat of the Year	—N/a	Won	
2014	AVN Award	Best All-Girl Group Sex Scene (with Gracie Glam and Raven Rockette)	Meow! 3	Won	
2014	AVN Award	Best Boy/Girl Sex Scene (with Manuel Ferrara)	Cuties 4	Nominated	
2014	AVN Award	Best Girl/Girl Sex Scene (with Jessie Andrews)	Girl Crush 3	Nominated	
2014	AVN Award	Best New Starlet	—N/a	Won	
2014	AVN Award	Best Oral Sex Scene	Swallow This 30	Nominated	
2014	AVN Award	Best Solo Sex Scene	All Natural Glamour Solos 3	Nominated	
2014	AVN Award	Best Three-Way Sex Scene – Boy/Boy/Girl (with Mick Blue and Ramón Nomar)	Mia	Nominated	
2014	XBIZ Award	Best New Starlet	—N/a	Nominated	
2014	XBIZ Award	Best Scene – Non-Feature Release (with Danny Mountain)	Eternal Passion	Nominated	
2014	XBIZ Award	Best Scene – All-Girl (with Malena Morgan)	We Live Together 29	Nominated	
2014	XRCO Award	New Starlet	—N/a	Nominated	
2014	XRCO Award	Cream Dream	—N/a	Won	
2014	Fame Registry Award	Brightest New Star	—N/a	Won	
2017	XBIZ Award	Best Actress – Feature Release	The Preacher's Daughter	Won	
2018	Pornhub Award	Hottest Female Ass	—N/a	Won	
2018	Pornhub Award	Most Popular Female Performer by Women	—N/a	Won	
2018	Urban X Award	Best Couples Scene (with Jason Luv)	Interracial Icon 7	Won	
2019	AVN Award	Best Group Sex Scene	After Dark	Won	
2019	Fleshbot Award	Best Group Sex Scene	After Dark	Won	
2019	Pornhub Award	Blowjob Queen – Top Blowjob Performer	—N/a	Won	
2021	AVN Award	Mainstream Venture of the Year	—N/a	Won	
2026	AVN Award	Hottest All-Girl Creator Collab (with Angela White and Riley Reid)	—N/a	Won	
