= Swapna (journalist) =

Indian journalist

- Born: 6 September 1974 (age 51); Hyderabad, India
- Occupations: Journalist and TV anchor, singer

Swapna (born 6 September 1974) is the managing editor of the Telugu-language news channel 10TV. She is also a Telugu-language TV presenter who initially worked for Tv9 and is also a Singer and journalist.

== Biography ==
Swapna was born in Hyderabad to Jyotsna, an FM radio presenter known for the popular programme JAPA 4. Her maternal grandmother is a presenter of Radio Bhanumati of All India Radio.

Swapna started her career in TV anchoring with TV9 (Telugu) and hosted popular shows such as Shara Maamule. She later moved to radio as the regional programming head of BIG FM 92.7. She hosted the Ramuism series with RGV.She is a trained performer of Carnatic classical vocal and musical instruments.

== Filmography ==
Year	Title	Role	Notes
2011	Key	Candidate 9	
2014	Race Gurram	Nijam show anchor	
2019	Amma Rajyam Lo Kadapa Biddalu	Police inspector	
2019	Nani's Gang Leader	Interviewer	
