= Officer (2018 film) =

2018 film directed by Ram Gopal Varma

- Movie Poster
- Directed by: Ram Gopal Varma
- Written by: P. Jaya Kumar
- Screenplay by: Ram Gopal Varma
- Story by: Ram Gopal Varma
- Starring: Nagarjuna Akkineni; Myra Sareen
- Cinematography: Bharat Vyas N. Rahul Penumatsa
- Edited by: Anwar Ali; R. Kamal
- Music by: Ravi Shankar
- Production company: R Company Production
- Release date: 1 June 2018
- Running time: 124 mins
- Country: India
- Language: Telugu

Officer is a 2018 Indian Telugu-language action film produced and directed by Ram Gopal Varma on his R Company Production banner. The film stars Nagarjuna Akkineni, Myra Sareen in the lead roles and music composed by Ravi Shankar. The Tamil dubbed version, Simtaangaran was released on 1 January 2021.

This film was a failure both critically and commercially.

== Plot ==
Sivaji Rao is a Hyderabad-based IPS officer who is posted as an SIT officer in Mumbai.

== Cast ==
- Nagarjuna Akkineni as Sivaji Rao
- Myra Sareen as Meena Narang
- Anwar Khan as Narayan Pasari
- Sayaji Shinde as JCP Ramdas
- Ajay as Prasad
- Srikanth Iyengar as Bajrangi
- Ankur Ratan as John
- Baby Kavya as Shaalu
- Vizag Prasad as Producer (cameo appearance)

== Production ==
The film shooting started on 20 November 2017 at the Annapurna Studios, Hyderabad. Nagarjuna & Ram Gopal Varma are pairing up almost after 25 years, this is the fifth film in their combination, their previous works being Shiva (1989), Shiva (1990), Antham/Drohi (1992) and Govinda Govinda (1994). The motion poster of the film released on 28 February 2018 and its teaser was released on 9 April 2018. The second teaser released on 4 May while the theatrical trailer released on 12 May.

== Soundtrack ==
Officer

Film score by Ravi Shankar
- Released: 28 May 2018
- Recorded: 2018
- Genre: Soundtrack
- Length: 10:20
- Label: Mango Music
- Producer: Ravi Shankar

Music composed by Ravi Shankar. Lyrics were written by Sira Sri. The music was released on Mango Music Company.

No.	Title	Singer(s)	Length
1.	"Navve Nuvvu"	Ravi Shankar, Ramya Behera	04:09
2.	"Shehanai Baje"	Manish Ragire, Manya Narang, Shakshi	03:13
3.	"Officer Theme"	Instrumental	02:58
Total length:			10:20
