= Sarkar Raj =

2008 Indian film by Ram Gopal Varma

- Theatrical release poster
- Directed by: Ram Gopal Varma
- Written by: Prashant Pandey
- Produced by: Ram Gopal Varma; Praveen Nischol
- Starring: Amitabh Bachchan; Abhishek Bachchan; Aishwarya Rai Bachchan; Tanishaa; Dilip Prabhavalkar; Supriya Pathak
- Cinematography: Amit Roy
- Edited by: Nipun Ashok Gupta; Amit Parmar
- Music by: Score: Amar Mohile; Songs: Bapi–Tutul
- Production companies: Adlabs; Raksha Entertainment; K Sera Sera Productions; Z Picture Company
- Distributed by: Balaji Motion Pictures (India); Eros International (International)
- Release date: 6 June 2008
- Running time: 125 minutes
- Country: India
- Language: Hindi
- Budget: ₹ 280 million
- Box office: ₹ 594.6 million

Sarkar Raj (transl. Government rule) is a 2008 Indian Hindi-language political action thriller film directed by Ram Gopal Varma. The film is a sequel to the 2005 film Sarkar and the second installment of the Sarkar film series. The film premiered at the 2008 Cannes Film Festival, the New York Asian Film Festival, and the 9th IIFA World Premiere-Bangkok.

The film was archived at the Academy of Motion Pictures library. The primary cast features Amitabh Bachchan, Abhishek Bachchan (who reprise their roles from the original) and new entrant Aishwarya Rai Bachchan. Supriya Pathak, Tanishaa, and Ravi Kale also reappeared in their respective roles from Sarkar. The film was released on 6 June 2008 and was critically and commercially successful. The continuation and third installment Sarkar 3, was released on 12 May 2017 to positive reviews.

A promotional mobile video game based on the film was released by Mauj Mobile in 2008.

== Plot ==
The sequel is chronologically set two years after the original film. Anita Rajan (Aishwarya Rai Bachchan), is the CEO of Shepard Power Plant based in London, holds a meeting with Mike Rajan (Victor Banerjee), her chairman father, and Hassan Qazi (Govind Namdeo), as a seemingly shady business adviser and facilitator; regarding an ambitious proposal to set up a multibillion-dollar power plant in rural parts of the state of Maharashtra in India.

Qazi states that this project will be impossible due to possible political entanglements. When Anita asks him for a solution, Qazi states that enlisting the support of Subhash Nagre (Amitabh Bachchan) (commonly referred to by his title of Sarkar), who he describes as a criminal in the garb of a popular and influential political leader, might help their cause. Along with the Chief Minister of Maharashtra, Shinde (Shishir Sharma), they approach Sarkar with the idea of this project, who refutes the idea, due to the fact that the power plant will be built in various villages, affecting the livelihood of 40,000 people. However, when Shankar (Abhishek Bachchan) convinces him of the benefits of the project to the state, Sarkar agrees to the proposal. Shankar advises Anita to stay away from Qazi, as he is not trustworthy. Qazi joins hands with Kaanga (Sayaji Shinde), who wants to become the Chief Minister of Maharashtra but could not as Sarkar is the overlord for Shinde's political party. Shankar and Anita begin campaigning in Thackerwadi to gain support of local public for the project. During their chat Shankar mentions that his toughest decision of life was to kill his own elder brother Vishnu, Anita tells that her father never saw her as a daughter and was her boss.

Sanjay Somji (Rajesh Shringarpure), leader of farmer's association is shown to be protesting the Nagre's. Meanwhile, Avantika, now Shankar's wife reveals to him that she is two months pregnant, Shankar also has growing friction in relationship with old family aid Chander (Ravi Kale). On the other hand, Shankar's wife Avantika's car is bombed within the premises of Sarkar's villa, and Avantika is killed, Sarkar who is shaken suffers a shock and is admitted to a hospital. Shankar replaces Bala (Sumit Nijhawan) as head over Chander (Ravi Kale), and asks him to quickly find out who was behind this brutal attack. Kantilal Vohra (Upendra Limaye) come to Sarkar requesting him to shift the project to Gujarat. As Sarkar refuses, Vohra, Kaanga, Qazi, are shown together hatching a plan. Chander calls up Shankar telling Qazi was behind the blast, Shankar shoots Qazi in his house. Mike comes to India and is seen to be meeting Vohra discussing about eliminating Shankar as, they both want only profit and Shankar aims for development for 40,000 villagers living in Thackerwadi also.

Vohra and Kaanga now hire a hitman to kill Shankar for 5-Crore. While Shankar and Anita are on a holiday, Anita cautions Shankar about an impending attack on them, a sniper shoots at Shankar six bullets, who later succumbs to his injuries in hospital. A furious Subash suspecting Vohra, kidnaps him.

Sarkar tells Anita that his men have killed-Kaanga, Chander, Vohra and her father who was in London as revenge. He also tells her that these people were just pawns and the mastermind behind all this was his own guru, Rao Sahab (Dilip Prabhawalkar) who wanted his grandson Somji to take over Shankar. His guru comes to home to pay tributes to Shankar, where Sarkar shows him his dead grandson. The film ends with Anita becoming Shankar's replacement.

== Cast ==
- Amitabh Bachchan as Subhash Nagre
- Abhishek Bachchan as Shankar Nagre
- Aishwarya Rai Bachchan as Anita Rajan
- Tanishaa as Avantika, Shankar's wife
- Govind Namdeo as Hassan Qazi
- Victor Banerjee as Mike Rajan, Anita's father
- Supriya Pathak as Pushpa Nagre
- Sayaji Shinde as Karunesh Kaanga
- Dilip Prabhavalkar as Rao Saab
- Sumeet Nijhawan as Bala
- Kay Kay Menon as Vishnu Nagare (archive footage)
- Upendra Limaye as Kantilal Vohra
- Rajesh Shringarpure as Sanjay Somji
- Shishir Sharma as Sunil Shinde
- Ravi Kale as Chander
- Javed Ansari as The Hitman

== Reception ==
=== Critical reception ===
The film mostly garnered a positive critical reception. Critic Taran Adarsh from Bollywood Hungama gave the film four stars out of five and noted "Besides its strong content, Sarkar Raj has been filmed exceptionally well with superb performances. Amitabh Bachchan, expectedly, comes up with a terrific performance. He's as ferocious as a wounded tiger in the finale and takes the film to great heights. Abhishek Bachchan is cast opposite the finest actor of this country, yet he sparkles in every sequence. Aishwarya Rai Bachchan is fabulous and delivers her career-best performance." Sify gave a two-star rating and said, "The only reason you might want to catch this is the performance level and the relatively good ending. Amitabh Bachchan is dependably good. Abhishek holds his own, though with a more filled-out character, he could have taken it to another level. Aishwarya is superb in the emotional scenes, but again, is let down by the unforgivably simplistic character sketching." Rediff which also gave a two-star rating noted "This is a watchable".

The Economic Times gave a three star rating out of five and said "Sarkar Raj clearly gains major marks for its clever culmination, which was so much lacking from recent RGV products. The considerately and crisply penned dialogues by Prashant Pandey add a lot of insight to the scenes and depth to the characterizations." Anupama Chopra from NDTV stated "What works here are the performances. The Bachchans-all three of them are in fine form. Despite wonderful performances and nicely done dramatic moments, Sarkar Raj doesn't pack the visceral punch of Sarkar".

Nikhat Kazmi of The Times of India rated the film with three and a half stars and applauded the lead performances saying "This film carries the sequel forward without losing out on the gritty feel and retains the charisma of the central characters". Critic Nathan Southern of MSN gave four stars citing that "Sarkar Raj thrives on its narrative cliffhangers, that the film never once fails to engage the audience; the premise and its characters are rock-solid, its dialogue convincing, and its suspense palpable. Varma and scriptwriter Prashant Pandey pack such unusual twists and double-crosses into the tale that even the most hardened and seasoned moviegoer will find the conclusion impossible to foresee".

=== Box office reception ===
Sarkar Raj grossed almost ₹ 340 million in India and over $1 million in the USA. The Filmfare Magazine (August 2008 issue) and other media declared it to be among the only four hits in the first half of 2008 (along with Race, Jodhaa Akbar and Jannat).

The producers reported that the movie had earned more than the entire grossings of its hit prequel in its first two weeks itself. According to the year end report of The Free Trade Journal, Sarkar Raj was the seventh highest all-India grosser of the year after (in order) Ghajini, Rab Ne Bana Di Jodi, Golmaal Returns, Singh Is Kinng, Dostana and Race. The trade magazine also reported high international collections. It was declared an average grosser at the box office with noted film journal Film Information mentioning that although the film was a profitable venture for its producers, the distributors outside of Bombay circuit stood to lose.

== Soundtrack ==
Sarkar Raj

Soundtrack album
- Released: 15 June 2008
- Recorded: 2007 (most songs) 2005-2006 (Jhini Jhini)
- Genre: Feature film soundtrack
- Language: Hindi
- Label: T-Series

The music is composed by Bapi and Tutul. Lyrics are penned by Sandeep Nath and Prashant Pandey.

=== Track listing ===
No.	Title	Lyrics	Singer(s)	Length
1.	"Chaah Bhanwar Trishna"	Sandeep Nath	Sunayana Sarkar Dasgupta	3:30
2.	"Jalte Rawan"	Prashant Pandey	Abhishek Nailwal	3:02
3.	"Jalwa Re Jalwa"	Prashant Pandey	Kailash Kher, Sunayana Sarkar Dasgupta	4:37
4.	"Jhini Jhini"	Prashant Pandey	Roop Kumar Rathod, Shweta Pandit	4:04
5.	"Saam Daam"	Sandeep Nath	Kailash Kher	3:29
6.	"Saher Saher Ke Hajharon Sawal"	Sandeep Nath	Arun Ingle, Bapi, Tutul	2:49
7.	"Subah"	Prashant Pandey	Pamela Jain	3:43
8.	"The Govinda – Chant"	Sandeep Nath	Kailash Kher, Bapi, Tutul	2:59
9.	"The Govinda – Groove"	Sandeep Nath	Bapi, Tutul, Jankee Parikh	3:03
10.	"The Govinda – Theme"	Prashant Pandey	Bapi, Tutul	3:34
11.	"The Govinda – Trance"	Sandeep Nath	Bapi, Tutul, Jankee Parikh	3:25
12.	"The Jalwa – Club Mix"	Sandeep Nath	Kailash Kher, Sunayana Sarkar Dasgupta	4:47

== Accolades ==
Award (Note: Awards, festivals and organizations are in alphabetical order.)	Date of ceremony (Note: Date is linked to the article about the awards held that year, wherever possible.)	Category	Recipient(s)	Result	Ref.
Filmfare Awards	28 February 2009	Best Supporting Actor	Abhishek Bachchan	Nominated	
International Indian Film Academy Awards	11–13 June 2009	Best Supporting Actor	Abhishek Bachchan	Nominated	
Producers Guild Film Awards (Note: Previously known as Apsara Film & Television Producers Guild Awards.)	5 December 2009	Best Actress in a Supporting Role	Supriya Pathak	Nominated	
Producers Guild Film Awards	5 December 2009	Best Actor in a Negative Role	Govind Namdev	Nominated	
Producers Guild Film Awards	5 December 2009	Best Screenplay	Prashant Pandey	Nominated	
Producers Guild Film Awards	5 December 2009	Best Cinematography	Amit Roy	Nominated	
Producers Guild Film Awards	5 December 2009	Best Art Director	Sunil Nigvekar	Nominated	
Producers Guild Film Awards	5 December 2009	Best Sound Recording	Debashish Mishra	Nominated	
Producers Guild Film Awards	5 December 2009	Best Re-Recording	Leslie Fernandes	Nominated	
Screen Awards	14 January 2009	Best Film	Sarkar Raj	Nominated	
Screen Awards	14 January 2009	Best Director	Ram Gopal Varma	Nominated	
Screen Awards	14 January 2009	Best Actor	Amitabh Bachchan	Nominated	
Screen Awards	14 January 2009	Best Supporting Actor	Abhishek Bachchan	Nominated	
Screen Awards	14 January 2009	Best Actor in a Negative Role	Dilip Prabhavalkar	Nominated	
Screen Awards	14 January 2009	Best Background Music	Amar Mohile	Nominated	
Screen Awards	14 January 2009	Best Cinematography	Amit Roy	Nominated	
Screen Awards	14 January 2009	Best Editing	Nitin Gupta, Amit Parmar	Nominated	
Screen Awards	14 January 2009	Best Sound Recording	Debashish Mishra	Nominated	
Stardust Awards	15 February 2009	Best Director	Ram Gopal Varma	Nominated	
Stardust Awards	15 February 2009	Actor of the Year – Male	Amitabh Bachchan	Nominated	
Stardust Awards	15 February 2009	Actor of the Year – Male	Abhishek Bachchan	Nominated	
Stardust Awards	15 February 2009	Actor of the Year – Female	Aishwarya Rai Bachchan	Nominated	
Stardust Awards	15 February 2009	The New Menace	Rajesh Shringarpure	Nominated	

== Controversy ==
Debutante Rajesh Shringarpore's character of Sanjay Somji was also reportedly based on Raj Thackeray, the estranged nephew of political leader Bal Thackeray; thus furthering the general viewpoint that the series is based on Bal Thackeray and his family. Apparently Ram Gopal Verma had even shown Raj Thackeray rushes of the film to allay his fears of being wrongly portrayed.

== Sequel ==
In 2009 Ram Gopal Verma stated that he had no plans finalised for the third instalment in the series and shelved Sarkar 3. However, in 2012 it was reported that the sequel would go ahead once again and currently is in the pre production stage where the script is being written. The film is expected to go on floors at the end of 2013, primarily with the same cast of Amitabh and Abhishek Bachchan although his character dies at the end of this film and also Aishwarya Rai is to be left out.

In August, 2016 director Ram Gopal Varma confirmed Sarkar 3. He told on his Twitter that Abhishek and Aishwarya will not be a part of the third installment.
