= Sarkar 3 =

- Theatrical release poster
- Directed by: Ram Gopal Varma
- Written by: P. Jaya Kumar
- Screenplay by: P. Jaya Kumar
- Produced by: Rahul Mittra; Amitabh Bachchan; Anand Pandit; Weone Films
- Starring: Amitabh Bachchan; Yami Gautam; Jackie Shroff; Manoj Bajpayee; Amit Sadh; Ronit Roy; Fiza; Parag Tyagi; Bajrangbali Singh
- Cinematography: Amol Rathod
- Edited by: Anwar Ali
- Music by: Ravi Shankar; Rohan Vinayak
- Production companies: Wave Cinemas; Raju Chadha Films; Alumbra Entertainment; A Company Product; AB Corp Ltd
- Distributed by: Eros International
- Release date: 12 May 2017
- Running time: 131 minutes
- Language: Hindi

Sarkar 3 (transl. Government 3) is a 2017 Indian Hindi-language political action thriller film directed by Ram Gopal Varma. It is the third installment of the Sarkar franchise and the continuation of the events of Sarkar Raj. The film stars Amitabh Bachchan again in the titular lead role, along with Yami Gautam, Jackie Shroff, Manoj Bajpayee, Amit Sadh, Ronit Roy and Parag Tyagi.

It was released on 12 May 2017.

== Plot ==
Business tycoon Deven Gandhi approaches Subhash Nagre "Sarkar" for a real estate project over a large slum in Dharavi Mumbai. Sarkar suggests that Gandhi should offer appropriate compensation and relocate the slum dwellers. Gandhi deems that too expensive and would rather offer a smaller commission to Sarkar to force the relocation. Sarkar refuses, and when Gandhi insists that he will go to another power bastion, Sarkar asserts that he will not let Gandhi go ahead. Gandhi reports back to his Dubai-based boss, Vallya. They join hands with a rival opposition leader named Govind Deshpande and plot to oust Sarkar.

Sarkar's wife pleads with him to permit their grandson Shivaji Nagre "Chiku" to join him. Sarkar hesitates: the boy is hot-headed and volatile like his deceased father, Vishnu Nagre, but ultimately relents. Chiku immediately clashes with Gokul (Sarkar's long-time loyal right-hand man) and accomplice Raman Guru over various matters, including whether or not to eliminate Deshpande. It is implied that Chiku's girlfriend Annu is using him to get to Sarkar because Sarkar had apparently eliminated her father. Meanwhile, Gandhi approaches Gokul with the proposition to help him; otherwise, Chiku would become the next Sarkar and Gokul would remain a servant.

Deshpande plots with Gandhi and Vallya to instigate mill workers against Sarkar. Chikku is on the warpath to attack Deshpande. Sarkar tries to determine who is behind everything. One day, Deshpande is hotly pursued and killed, and Sarkar, who has long held a reputation for bumping the opposition, is blamed. Sarkar notes that whoever did this is determined and cunning and will stop at nothing. When assassins open fire on Sarkar at the Ganpati Visarjan festival, it becomes clear that Sarkar's inner circle has been breached. Chiku shows Sarkar the video of Gandhi meeting Gokul and, separately, Gokul remonstrates and says that Chiku, used by the wily Annu and his own vengeance for his father, is behind everything. Sarkar expels Chiku, and Chiku joins Gandhi.

Vallya organises a bomb blast at the mill. Gokul reports that it was executed by Chikku, who is now out to destroy Sarkar, and Gandhi. Around this time, Sarkar's wife passes away, and Gokul beseeches Sarkar to give the order to kill Chikku. Chikku is shot at, but he escapes. Gokul begins hunting him down. But Gokul is then, presumably, shot dead by Chiku, and Sarkar swears vengeance.

Vallya arrives in India to meet Sarkar. He points out that Chiku is too inexperienced to become Sarkar and is useless, and offers to help Sarkar eliminate Chiku. Sarkar discloses that Chiku was dispatched to infiltrate Gandhi by none other than Sarkar himself and that it was he who ordered Gokul's killing. Annu discovers that it was Gandhi who killed her father, not Sarkar, and she shoots him.

Hindsight reveals that differences with Annu had been cleared and she was taken into confidence, and that Gokul had turned to Gandhi and played a part in the mill agitation and the slum development in order to sideline Chiku, eventually hoping to become Sarkar. Their objective was to draw out Vallya. Chiku walks in, kills Raman Guru, there is another gunshot, and Vallya is shown dead. With their adversaries now dead, Sarkar and Chiku sip tea while Sarkar educates the inexperienced Chiku on 'palace politics'.

== Cast ==
- Amitabh Bachchan as Subhash Nagre "Sarkar"
- Amit Sadh as Shivaji Nagre "Cheeku"
- Yami Gautam as Annu Karkare
- Jackie Shroff as Michael Vallya "Sir"
- Manoj Bajpayee as Govind Deshpande
- Supriya Pathak as Pushpa Nagre
- Fiza as Theba, Vallya's girlfriend
- Ronit Roy as Gokul Satam
- Parag Tyagi as Raman Guru
- Bharat Dabholkar as Gorakh Rampur
- Rohini Hattangadi as Rukku Bai Devi
- Shiv Sharma as Mukul Shumpre
- Bajrangbali Singh as Deven Gandhi
- Abhishek Bachchan as Shankar Nagre (cameo appearance)

== Production ==
In 2009, Ram Gopal Varma stated that he had no plans finalised for the third installment in the series and subsequently shelved Sarkar 3. However, in 2012, it was reported that the sequel was in the pre production stage. The film was expected to go on floors at the end of 2013, primarily with the same cast of Amitabh and Abhishek Bachchan, albeit leaving the latter's character dead at the end of Sarkar Raj. Aishwarya Rai was reported to have been left out.

In August 2016, director Ram Gopal Varma confirmed Sarkar 3. He stated on Twitter that Abhishek and Aishwarya will not be a part of the third installment.

== Soundtrack ==
The soundtrack was released by Eros Now Music. The music was composed by Rohan Vinayak and Ravi Shankar. The full soundtrack was released on 3 May 2017 and has seven songs.

Track listing
No.	Title	Singer(s)	Length
1.	"Angry Mix"	Mika Singh, Sukhwinder Singh	5:07
2.	"Ganpati Aarti"	Amitabh Bachchan	4:04
3.	"Gussa"	Sukhwinder Singh	5:05
4.	"Sam Dham"	Kailash Kher, Saket Bairoliya	3:30
5.	"Thamba"	Navraj Hans	5:03
6.	"Shakti"	Sukhwinder Singh, Saket Bairoliya, Adarsh Shinde	4:32
7.	"Sarkar Trance"	Niladri Kumar	3:18
Total length:			30:40
