= Politics in South India =

Politics in South India are heavily influenced by the language-based state divisions of India, from which several state parties have formed their identities, and popular opposition to the use of Hindi as an official language, along with demographic differences such as the higher population of Christians and historically lower population of Muslims.

Despite the trope that religious politics have had less success in South India, the BJP is one of the two major parties in two of the six states in India (Karnataka, Puducherry), part of a duopoly involving the NDA in two of the six states (undivided Andhra Pradesh), and was part of a ruling alliance in Tamil Nadu. Only Kerala, where Hindus form 54% of the population, has never had the BJP in power. Hindu nationalism is less pronounced, although the BJP is influential in most states of South India, and the AIADMK can be considered to be the Hindu nationalist party in Tamil Nadu (with Christians/Muslims voting for DMK).

South India has a population of 253,051,953, with a population replacement level of 2.1 for all states combined, with Kerala and Tamil Nadu having the lowest TFRs in India at 1.7, meaning that it has a declining youth population. Christians were historically the largest minority religious group in Tamil Nadu and remain influential in Kerala politics. The political culture of promising freebies in return for votes primarily emerged in South India, notably Tamil Nadu.

== Andhra Pradesh ==
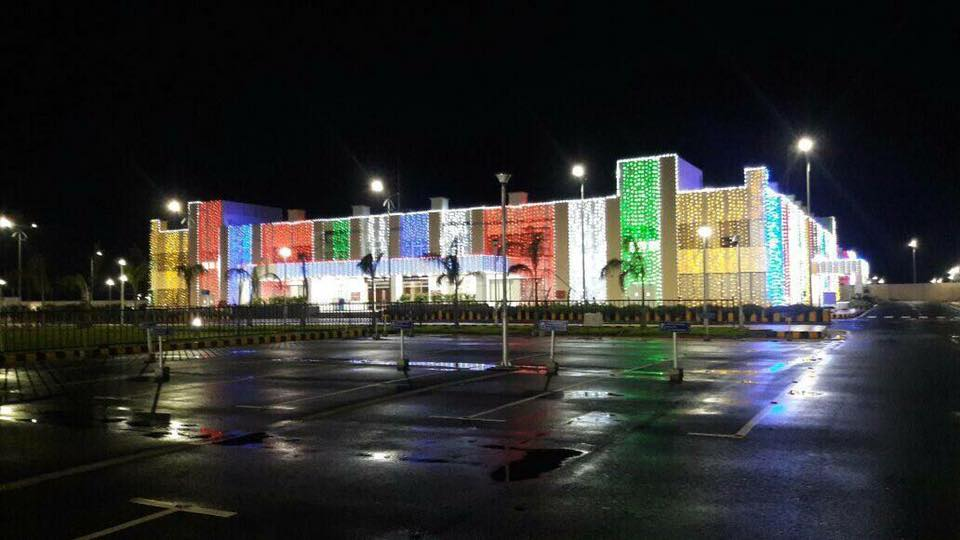
Andhra Pradesh Secretariat at Amaravati, India

After the formation of Andhra Pradesh in 1953, the Indian National Congress ruled the state for 30 years, winning all elections in the period. This changed in the 1980s due to the establishment of a regional party named Telugu Desam Party (TDP) by Telugu film superstar Nandamuri Taraka Rama Rao. They won the 1983 Assembly election by a landslide, NTR becoming the first non-Congress Chief Minister of Andhra Pradesh. Since then, both the TDP and the Congress have dominated Andhra politics, with either party coming to power.

The main issue which dominates Andhra politics is the Telangana movement aimed at the formation of a separate Telangana state consisting of the northern districts of Andhra Pradesh. The idea is widely opposed by the members from Rayalaseema and Coastal Andhra regions, who favour a united Andhra Pradesh. Caste also figures prominently with politics dominated by major castes like the Reddys, the Kammas and the Kapus. Naxalism is a political issue in the state, especially Uttarandhra and Telangana regions. Like Tamil Nadu, the film industry in the state has influenced Andhra politics. Besides NTR, film stars like Chiranjeevi, Pawan Kalyan and Dasari Narayana Rao among others have successfully made their mark in the politics of the state.

Andhra Pradesh state leaders have contributed at the national level, with former Chief Ministers Neelam Sanjeeva Reddy and P. V. Narasimha Rao becoming the President of India and Prime Minister of India respectively and NTR involved in the formation of the National Front which ruled India between 1989-91. BJP also ruled Andhra Pradesh as a part of alliance govt with TDP.

== Telangana ==
The President issued a gazette notification that Telangana state would be carved out of Andhra Pradesh on 2 June 2014.

In the early Telangana movement, Marri Chenna Reddy formed a party call Telangana Praja Samithi to lead the Telangana movement. In November 1969, there was a major split in the party and as result the movement went down. After two years the Telangana Praja Samithi was dissolved and its members rejoined the Congress. On 29 November 2009, KCR started a fast-unto-death, demanding that the Congress party introduce a Telangana bill in Parliament. Student organisations, employee unions, and various organisations joined the movement. As general strikes shut down Telangana, the Telangana Bill was passed in the Lok Sabha on 18 February 2014 and in the Rajya Sabha on 18 February 2014, with support from the BJP. On 4 March 2014 the Government of India declared that 2 June would be Telangana Formation Day. BJP now has a significant role in Telangana politics. They won 4 Loksabha seats in the 2019 Indian General Elections and 8 seats in 2024 General Elections.

== Karnataka ==
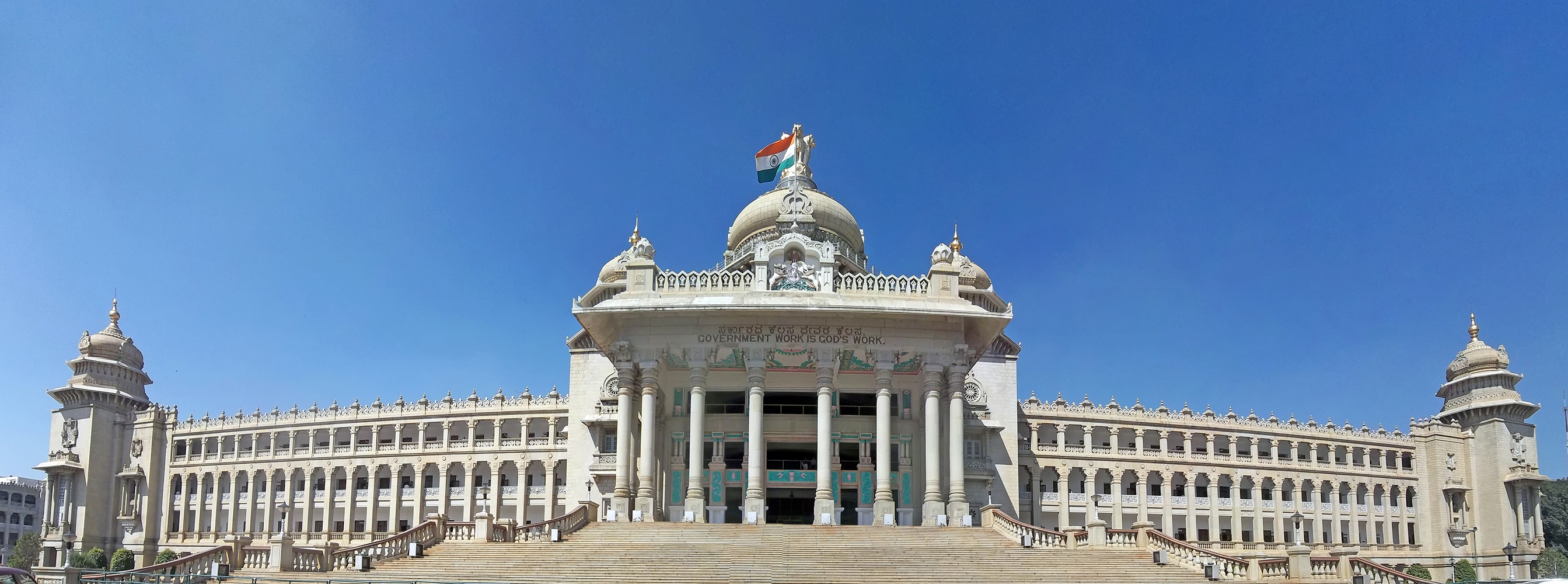
Vidhana Soudha

The Indian National Congress has been far more successful in Karnataka than it has been in national politics. National political parties such as the Bharatiya Janata Party have experienced comparatively more success in Karnataka than they have in other states of South India. Karnataka's political environment is dominated by two caste groups — the southern Karnataka dominated by Vokkaligas and the north and central Karnataka dominated by Lingayats but Dalits are major voters and the deciding factor of the ruling party in Karnataka . Ramakrishna Hegde played an integral part in the ascent of the Janata Dal into the national foray in the late 1980s. However, it was his political rival H.D. Deve Gowda, then the Chief Minister of Karnataka, who later went on to become the Prime Minister of India. Caste has figured prominently in Karnataka politics. Anti-Hindi and anti-Tamil movements were prominent in Karnataka politics in the 1960s and 1970s. Language activism is high in the state, with organisations like the Karnataka Rakshana Vedike and the Kannada Chaluvali Vatal Paksha often launching agitations for protecting the interests of Kannada and Kannadigas. The Kaveri water dispute with Tamil Nadu and the Belgaum border dispute with Maharashtra both hold an important place in the politics of the state. In the 2018 state assembly elections Yedyurappa led BJP, winning 104 seats out of 224, followed by INC 78, JD(S)37; but on the day of results none of the party reached the magic number 113 so INC offered unconditional support to JDS form a government on basis of ideology. But after a 14 month stint in office H.D Kumaraswamy's government fell on July 23, 2019 and as a result both congress and JD(S) parted ways after 14 months. BJP is the largest Political party & the ruling party in the state now.

== Kerala ==
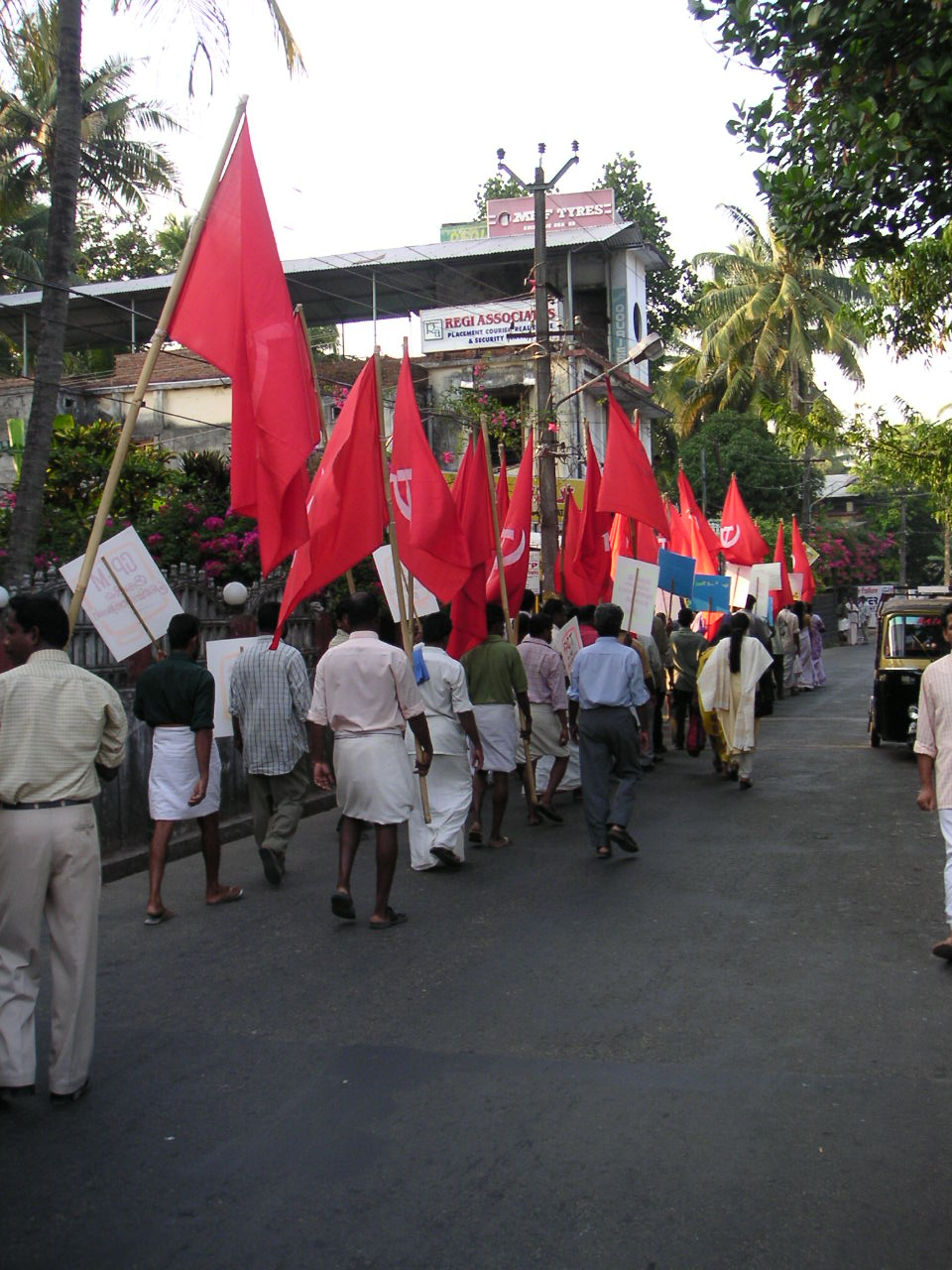
A political rally of the Left Democratic Front in Kerala.

Politics in Kerala comprises two major political alliances: the United Democratic Front (UDF — led by the Indian National Congress), the Left Democratic Front (LDF — led by the Communist Party of India (Marxist)) alternating to power. Kerala has a significant Muslim and Christian population which traditionally form the base of UDF, whereas Ezhavas, a backward class community form the core of LDF. Former president K R Narayanan, and first Leader of opposition in the Lok Sabha A K Gopalan of CPM, were both from Kerala. Kerala created history by democratically electing communists to power in 1957, being the first in the world to do so.

== Tamil Nadu ==
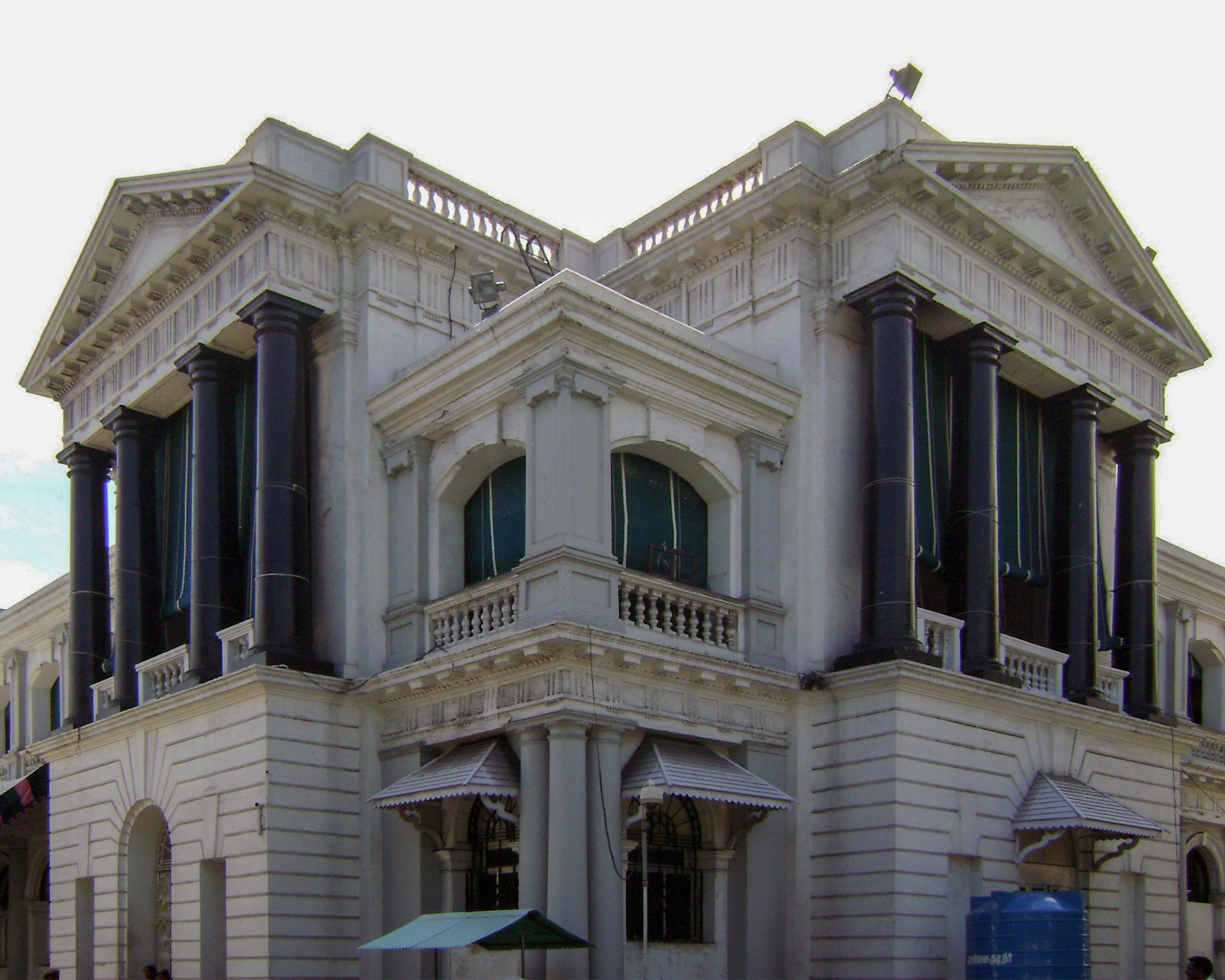
Fort St. George, India, the seat of Tamil Nadu assembly

Indian National Congress dominated the political scene in the initial years post independence with leaders like C. Rajagopalachari and K. Kamaraj. The political influence shifted towards Dravida Munnetra Kazhagam in the late 1960s. The shift in political power in Tamil Nadu was due to the rise of Dravidan Nationalism spearheaded by leaders such as Periyar Ramasami and C. N. Annadurai, who extolled the achievements of Tamilians in ways that the common man could relate to. The main facets of state politics in Tamil Nadu included language — the distinction between Tamil and non-Tamil speakers was an important tool used by the DMK in the 1960s and caste — such as the Self-respect Movement. The imposition of Hindi on non-Hindi speaking areas of India has often been a contentious issue in Tamil Nadu. In January–February 1965, large scale Anti-Hindi agitations, a cause championed by the DMK, occurred in Tamil Nadu. In 1972, a split in the DMK resulted in the formation of the All India Anna Dravida Munnetra Kazhagam led by MG Ramachandran. Since then, the two major Dravidian parties DMK headed by Karunanidhi and ADMK led by Jayalailtha alternate to power.

Former Presidents R Venkataraman and APJ Abdul Kalam were from the state.

== See also ==
- List of political parties in India
- Politics of India
- Dravida Nadu
