= Parag Tyagi =

Indian actor (born 1975)

- Born: 27 November 1975 (age 50); Modinagar, Uttar Pradesh, India
- Occupation: Actor
- Years active: 2008–present
- Known for: Pavitra Rishta; Jodha Akbar; Brahmarakshas; Shakti Astitva Ke Ehsaas Ki
- Spouse: Shefali Jariwala (m. 2014; died 2025)

Parag Tyagi (born 27 November 1975) is an Indian television and film actor.

== Career ==
He made his television debut portraying Vinod Karanjkar in Zee TV's popular drama Pavitra Rishta. Working in several daily soaps, Tyagi rose to fame and became a household name. He later appeared in notable television series, including Brahmarakshas, Jodha Akbar, and Shakti – Astitva Ke Ehsaas Ki.

In addition to television, Tyagi has acted in both Hindi and Telugu films. He made his film debut in the critically acclaimed thriller A Wednesday! (2008), and later appeared in Sarkar 3 (2017). He also made his mark in Telugu cinema with a role in the commercially successful film Agnyaathavaasi (2018), starring alongside Pawan Kalyan.

He was married to actress Shefali Jariwala, and the couple participated together in the dance reality show Nach Baliye.

== Filmography ==
=== Films ===
Year	Title	Role
2008	A Wednesday!	Aakash Duraivanshi
2017	Sarkar 3	Raman Guru
2018	Agnyaathavaasi	Parag Saran
2019	Venky Mama	Abu Osman
2020	Ruler	Bhuvneshwara
2022	Sarkaru Vaari Paata	Bihari
2023	Kisi Ka Bhai Kisi Ki Jaan	Yogeshwar Kodati

=== Television ===
Year	Title	Role	Notes
2009–2013	Pavitra Rishta	Vinod Karanjkar	
2012–2013	Nach Baliye 5	Contestant	7th place
2013–2014	Jodha Akbar	Mirza Sharifuddin	
2015	Kalash	Abhay Singh Deol	
2015	Nach Baliye 7	Contestant	7th place
2015–2016	Pyaar Ko Ho Jaane Do	Kailash Khurana	
2016	Brahmarakshas	Brahmarakshas/Sanjay	
2017	Kaala Teeka	Thakur Dev Sinha	
2019	Aghori	Rudranath/Aghori	
2020–2021	Shakti Astitva Ke Ehsaas Ki	DSP Santbaksh Singh	
2020–2021	Naagin 5	Head of Kite bird Clan / Balwant Singhania	
2021	Paapnashini Ganga	Maharaj Tarakasur	
