= God, Sex and Truth =

- Promotional release poster
- Directed by: Ram Gopal Varma
- Written by: P. Jaya Kumar
- Story by: Ram Gopal Varma
- Produced by: Ram Gopal Varma
- Starring: Mia Malkova
- Narrated by: Mia Malkova
- Music by: M. M. Keeravani
- Production company: Strike Force LLC
- Distributed by: Vimeo
- Release date: 27 January 2018
- Running time: 19 minutes
- Country: India
- Language: English

God, Sex and Truth is a 2018 Indian short monologue documentary directed by Ram Gopal Varma and starring American pornographic actress Mia Malkova. The film is a short documentary about the strength of female sexuality and beauty. It is scored by M. M. Keeravani and produced by Strike Force LLC, USA. It was released on 27 January 2018 on Vimeo OnDemand.

== Plot ==
In the film, Mia Malkova delivers a monologue about her sexuality, the role of women in society and the matriarchal and ultrafeminist bonds that attempt to tie them.

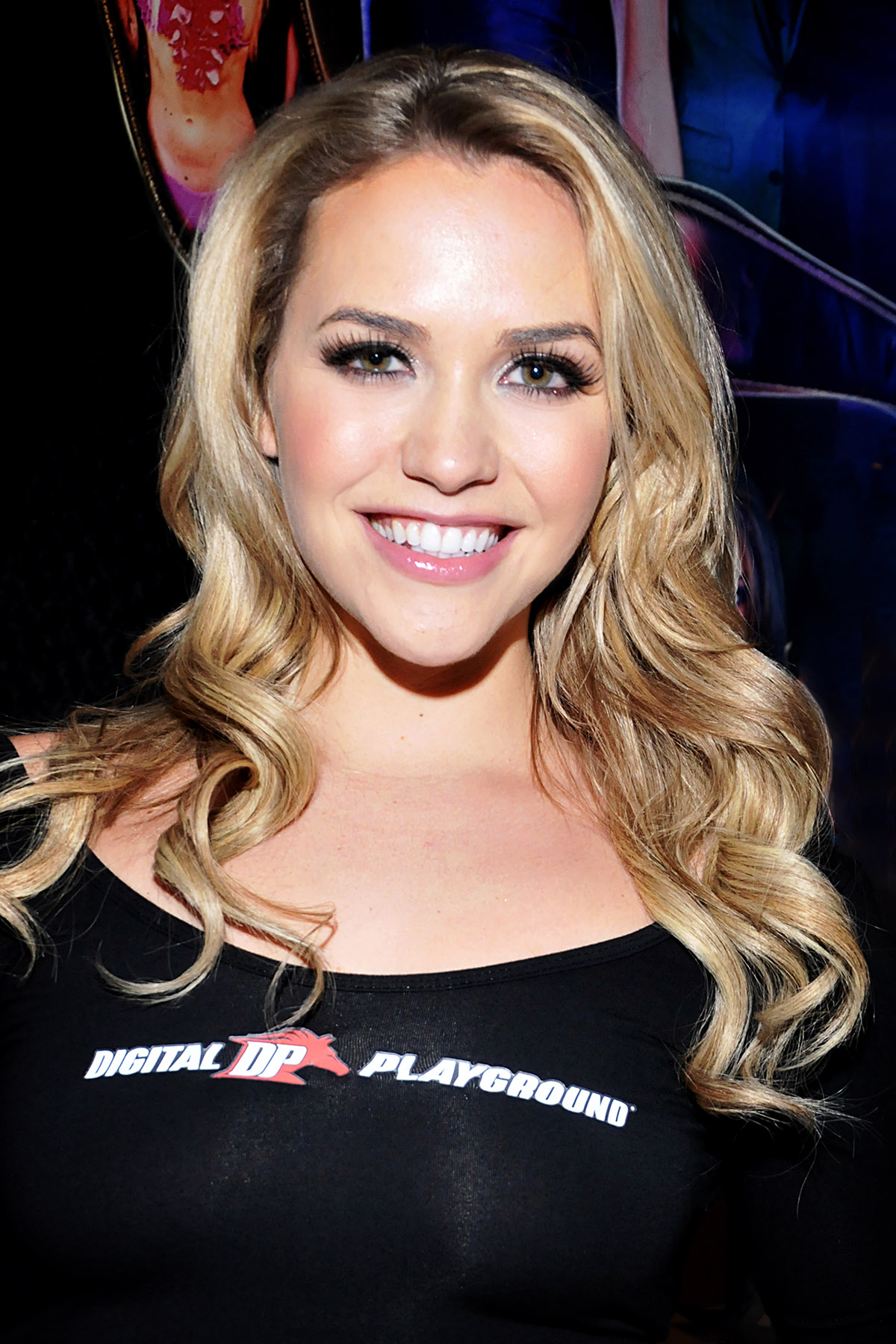
Mia Malkova, 2016

== Cast ==
- Mia Malkova as herself

== Controversy ==
The film was mired in controversy as a result of a creative dispute between the director and one of the scriptwriters, Jaya Kumar. This dispute eventually spiralled into lurid allegations of plagiarism, sexual harassment in the workplace, and improper compensation. This dispute resulted in a lawsuit filed against the director by Kumar in a civil court in India.

A case was filed against Varma for obscenity, one day prior to the film's release, on a complaint by a social activist in Hyderabad. The complaint was registered against him for publishing or transmitting obscene material in electronic form.

== Sequel ==
After positive reviews and critics, Ram Gopal Varma announced the sequel "GST2".
