= Prashant Pandey =

Indian film director

Prashant Pandey is an Indian screenwriter, lyricist, and director. He began his career writing Amitabh Bachchan's critically acclaimed Sarkar Raj (2008) featuring Amitabh Bachchan, Abhishek Bachchan and Aishwarya Rai.

Educated at Hansraj College University of Delhi, and AJK, Mass Communication Research Centre Jamia Millia Islamia, Prashant Pandey had a brief stint as a journalist for ANI-REUTERS and later as a creative head with Zee TV talent hunt SAREGAMAPA.

== Filmography ==
- Dil Dosti Etc (lyrics)
- Sarkar Raj (2008) (screenplay, dialogue and lyrics for 5 songs)
- Contract (2008) (story, screenplay, dialogue and lyrics)
- Phoonk (2008) (lyrics)
- Agyaat (2009) (lyrics)
- Rann (2010)
- Rakta Charitra (2010) (story, screenplay and dialogues)
- Turning 30 (2011) (lyrics)
- Always Kabhi Kabhi (2011) (lyrics)
- Bubble Gum (2011) (lyrics)
- The Attacks of 26/11 (2013) (dialogue)
- Traffic (2016) (dialogue)
- Poorna: Courage Has No Limit (2017)
