= Naina Ganguly =

Indian actress

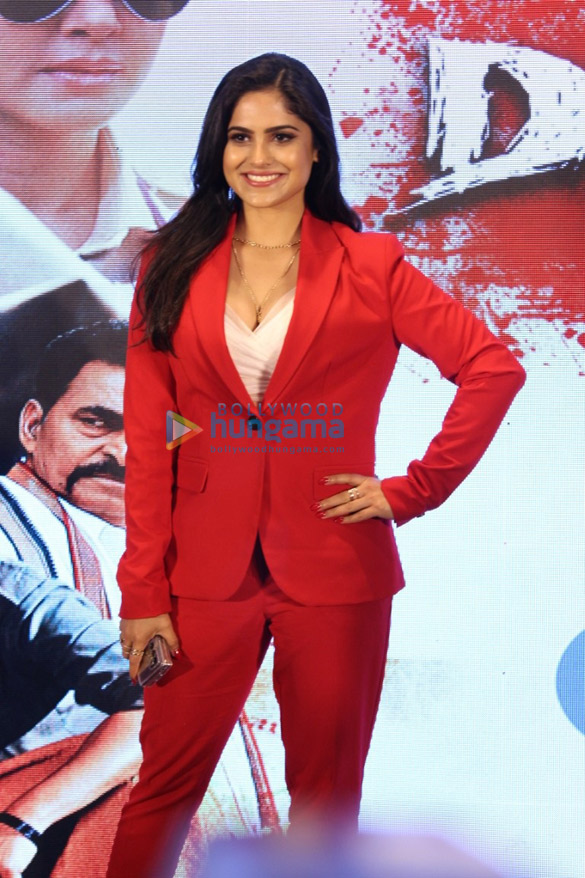
- Ganguly at RGV's Dhahanam Event
- Born: Calcutta, West Bengal, India
- Occupation: Actress
- Years active: 2016–present

Naina Ganguly is an Indian actress who appears in predominantly Telugu films. She is known for her frequent collaborations with Ram Gopal Varma including her role in Meri Beti Sunny Leone Banna Chaahti Hai (2017) and Charitraheen (2018 web series).

== Filmography ==
Key
†	Denotes films that have not yet been released

Year	Title	Role	Language	Notes	Ref.
2016	Vangaveeti	Ratna Kumari	Telugu		
2017	Meri Beti Sunny Leone Banna Chaahti Hai	Daughter	Hindi	Short film	
2020	Johaar	Bala	Telugu		
2021	D Company	Sujatha	Hindi		
2022	Malli Modalaindi	Pavithra	Telugu	Released on ZEE5	
2022	Dangerous		Telugu		
2022	Thaggedele		Telugu	Special appearance in the title song	
2024	Pranayam	Amrutha	Kannada		

=== Television ===
Key
†	Denotes films that have not yet been released

Year	Title	Role	Language	Notes	Ref.
2018	Charitraheen	Kiran/ Kiranmoyee	Bengali	Web series	
2019	Charitraheen 2	Kiran/ Kiranmoyee	Bengali	Web series	
2020	Charitraheen 3	Kiran/ Kiranmoyee	Bengali	Web series	
2021	D Company	Sujatha	Hindi	Web series	
2021	Parampara	Jenny	Telugu	Web series on Disney+ Hotstar	
