= Rao Gari Illu =

- Film poster
- Directed by: Tharani Rao
- Written by: Tharani Rao
- Dialogue by: D. V. Narasa Raju
- Produced by: Yarlagadda Surendra
- Starring: Akkineni Nageswara Rao; Revathi; Jayasudha
- Cinematography: Mahidhar
- Edited by: Gautham Raju
- Music by: Chakravarthy
- Production companies: Annapurna Studios; S. S. Creations
- Release date: 6 June 1988
- Running time: 166 minutes
- Country: India
- Language: Telugu

Rao Gari Illu (transl. Rao Sir's House) is a 1988 Indian Telugu-language drama film, produced by Y. Surendra under Annapurna Studios and S. S. Creations banner and directed by Tharani Rao. It stars Akkineni Nageswara Rao, Jayasudha and Revathi, while Nagarjuna made a cameo appearance and music was composed by Chakravarthy.

== Plot ==
Anand Rao, a public prosecutor, leads a happy life with his wife Jaya and five children. One day, Jaya dies in a road accident. From then on, Anand Rao becomes a drunkard, and his house is completely disintegrated. Anand Rao's friend SP Raghava Rao sends his cousin Shanti as governess to take care of the children, in her acquaintance, they become as a straight arrow and develop a lot of affection towards Shanti. Parallelly, Anand Rao and Raghava Rao always have a rivalry with Tata Rao, an underworld mafia broker; they want to arrest him red-handed and are just waiting for an opportunity. Meanwhile, Anand Rao's elder daughter Lata is a big fan of an actor Nagarjuna; one day, her classmates trap her, but her fortune is protected by Nagarjuna only. After some time, Anand Rao and Raghava Rao decide to marry Shanti marriage, but the children are not able to leave her, so they ask Anand Rao to marry her, but he refuses, and Shanti leaves the house. Eventually, Tata Rao kidnaps the children. Finally, Anand Rao saves his children, gets Shanti back, and marries her.

== Cast ==
- Akkineni Nageswara Rao as Anand Rao
- Jayasudha as Jaya
- Revathi as Shanthi
- Akkineni Nagarjuna as himself (guest)
- Murali Mohan as SP Raghava Rao
- Nutan Prasad as Tata Rao
- Brahmanandam as Tufan Baba
- Suthi Velu as Kalakullu Ludhavadanulu
- Bhimeswara Rao as an Officer
- Surya as Sivaji
- Uttej as Raghu's Friend
- Srikanth as Raghu
- Indira as Lata
- Master Minraj as Ramu
- Baby Kalyani as Bujji
- Baby Raasi as Chitti

== Soundtrack ==
The songs were composed by Chakravarthy. Lyrics written by Veturi.

Track listing
No.	Title	Singer(s)	Length
1.	"Sa Sa Saragaladali"	S. Janaki	3:40
2.	"Madhura Madhura Meevela"	Mano, S. Janaki	4:14
3.	"Bore Bore Chaduvu"	S. P. Balasubrahmanyam, P. Susheela	3:04
4.	"Chura Chura Chuse"	S. P. Balasubrahmanyam, P. Susheela	4:04
5.	"Manushula Mamathala"	S. P. Balasubrahmanyam	3:23
6.	"Magapurushulakika"	S. P. Balasubrahmanyam, Ramola	1:29
Total length:			18:25

== Reception ==
Giddaluri Gopalrao writing his review for Zamin Ryot on 17 June 1988, praised the director Tharani Rao for handling a sensitive storyline with ease.
