= Vangaveeti (film) =

2016 film by Ram Gopal Varma

- Film poster
- Directed by: Ram Gopal Varma
- Written by: Ram Gopal Varma
- Produced by: Dasari Kiran Kumar
- Starring: Sandeep Kumar; Vamsi Nakkanti; Vamsi Chaganti; Naina Ganguly; Kautilya; Sritej
- Narrated by: Ram Gopal Varma
- Cinematography: Rahul Srivastav; K. Dilip Varma; Surya Chowdhary
- Edited by: Siddhartha Thatholu
- Music by: Ravi Shankar
- Production company: Bad-Cow films
- Distributed by: Ramadutha Creations; A.K.S. Global Media LLC
- Release date: 23 December 2016
- Running time: 139 minutes
- Country: India
- Language: Telugu

Vangaveeti is a 2016 Indian Telugu-language biographical action film written and directed by Ram Gopal Varma. The film is based on the life of politician Vangaveeti Mohana Ranga, and his elder brother Vangaveeti Radha Krishna and their altercation with communist dominated Vijayawada of the 1970s-80s in Andhra Pradesh.

The film stars Sandeep Kumar, Vamsi Nakkanti, Kautilya, Shritej, Vamsi Chaganti, and Naina Ganguly. The theatrical trailer of the film was released on 2 October 2016 in Hyderabad, and the film was released on 23 December 2016.

== Plot ==
Set up in the 1970s Vijayawada, Vangaveeti Ranga's elder brother, Vangaveeti Radha also known as "Bustand Radha", gets associated with Communist Party of India, secretary for Vijayawada, Venkata Rathnam. After few years, conflicts arise between Venkata Rathnam, and Vangaveeti Radha, to get a hold on the Vijayawada transport business, dominated by the followers of Venkata Rathnam.

In 1972, Venkata Rathnam was murdered by Vangaveeti Radha and his supporters. These events, in turn, lead to retaliation by a rival group, and the murder of Vangaveeti Radha. Upon the death of Vangaveeti Radha, his brother Mohana Ranga takes over the leadership of United Independent Organization with the support of student union leaders Devineni Gandhi, and Devineni Nehru.

However, leadership issues and power struggles between politically powerful Mohana Ranga, and the Devineni Family leads to the splitting of the United independent organization, and in retaliation, Mohana Ranga's associate's murder Devineni Gandhi in 1979. At this juncture, Mohana Ranga's political career begins in 1981, when he contests in the municipal election when the Indian National Congress Party withdrew its official candidate in his favour. Later, his rival in the district, Nehru, gets sponsored by the Telugu Desam Party (TDP), which was dominated by the Kamma caste, while Ranga becomes a leader from Kapu community and stood for downtrodden. Ranga becomes an MLA for the Congress Party in 1985; Nehru becomes a TDP MLA, and eventually a minister.

Starting in 1983, both leaders implicate themselves in gang warfare, which was fed by caste rivalry between Kamma and Kapu; while N. T. Rama Rao was at the time the first Kamma chief minister of Andhra Pradesh. In 1988, Devineni Nehru's younger brother, Devineni Murali, was murdered by Mohana Ranga's associates in retaliation for his killings of few Ranga's associates. Subsequently, while on a hunger strike in support of issues of farmers, a group of men led by political rivals in the region, attack Mohana Ranga's camp in the early hours of 25 December 1988.

== Cast ==
- Sandeep Kumar in a dual role as Vangaveeti Radha and Vangaveeti Ranga
- Vamsi Nakkanti as Chalasani Venkata Ratnam
- Kautilya as Devineni Gandhi
- Sritej as Devineni Nehru
- Vamsi Chaganti as Devineni Murali
- Naina Ganguly as Ratna Kumari, Vangaveeti Ranga's wife
- Surya Chowdary as Gaja
- Kalyan Krishna as a member of radha gang
- Swarnakanth as Ambati Subbarao
- Rama Rao Jadhav as Mudragada Padmanabham
- Laxman Meesala

== Soundtrack ==
The music was composed by Ravi Shankar and released by Mango Music.

Vangaveeti

Soundtrack album by Ravi Shankar
- Released: 3 December 2016
- Recorded: 2016
- Genre: Soundtrack
- Length: 38:56
- Label: Mango Music
- Producer: Ravi Shankar

Track list
No.	Title	Lyrics	Singer(s)	Length
1.	"Na Pere Kumari"	Sira Sri	Geetha Madhuri	3:49
2.	"Ammalaganna Amma Durgamma"	Sira Sri	Saket Bairoliya	3:25
3.	"Pelli Aha Pelli"	Sira Sri	Hema Chandra, Srikanth, Malavika, Srushti Bandari	3:59
4.	"Maranam Adi Tadhyam"	Sira Sri	Ram Gopal Varma	4:36
5.	"Vangaveeti Katti"	Sira Sri	Rajasekhar Pannala	4:06
6.	"Mounam"	Chaitanya Prasad	Karunya, Saket Bairoliya	3:09
7.	"Kasi Kasi"	Chaitanya Prasad	Navraj Hans	4:01
8.	"Champara"	Chaitanya Prasad	Ram Gopal Varma	5:09
9.	"Ayigiri Nandini"	Sri Adi Sankaracharya	Vinayaka, Lokesh, Anurag, Puishmora	2:10
10.	"Revenge"	Sira Sri	Ram Gopal Varma, Saket Bairoliya	4:32
Total length:				38:56

== See also ==
- Gaayam, a 1993 action film based on Vijaywada Gang Warfare, directed by Ram Gopal Varma
- Gaayam 2, a 2010 sequel to Gaayam, directed by Praveen Sri
- Bejawada, a 2011 action film directed by Vivek Krishna
