= Parag Sanghvi =

Indian film producer

- Born: Mumbai
- Occupations: film producer, CEO Alumbra Entertainment, former M.D. K. Sera Sera
- Years active: 1990 - Present
- Website: https://paragsanghvi.com/

Parag Sanghvi is an Indian film, producer, CEO of Alumbra Entertainment & Lotus Film company. He is a business management graduate. The former M.D. of media company K. Sera Sera, is known for financing and distributing films. His recent home productions include Partner, Bhoot Returns and The Attacks of 26/11.
