= Ram Gopal Varma =

Indian film director, screenwriter and producer

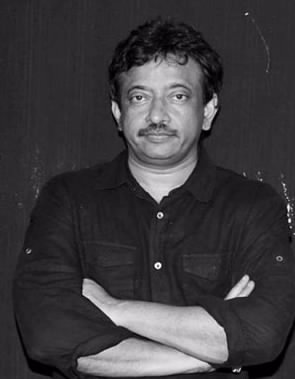
- Varma in 2012
- Born: Penmetsa Ram Gopal Varma; 7 April 1962 (age 64); Hyderabad, Andhra Pradesh (now in Telangana), India
- Other name: RGV
- Occupations: Film director; film producer; screenwriter
- Years active: 1989–present
- Works: Full list
- Spouse: Ratna (divorced)
- Children: 1
- Relatives: Madhu Mantena (cousin)
- Awards: Full list

Penmetsa Ram Gopal Varma (born 7 April 1962), also referred to by his initials RGV, is an Indian film director, screenwriter, and producer, primarily known for his work in Hindi and Telugu cinema. Varma has directed films across multiple genres, including parallel cinema and docudrama noted for their gritty realism, technical finesse, and craft. Regarded as one of the pioneers of new age Indian cinema, he is known for introducing new talents, who eventually become successful in the Indian film industry.

Starting his career as a civil engineer, he made an entry into Telugu cinema with the path-breaking crime thriller, Siva (1989) featured at the 13th IFFI' 90 Indian Panorama mainstream section, and has won Varma, the state Nandi Awards for Best direction, Best first film of a director, and the Filmfare Award for Best Film – Telugu. Subsequently, the film was included in CNN-IBN's list of 100 greatest Indian films of all time. Varma's next directorial was Kshana Kshanam (1991), the neo-noir heist film being featured at the Ann Arbor Film Festival, won him another Nandi Award for Best Direction, and the Nandi Award for Best Screenplay Writer. The 1993 political drama, Gaayam received six state Nandi Awards. In 1999, he directed Prema Katha for which he received his third Nandi Award for Best Director.

Varma is known for directing and presenting pan-Indian works casting actors across the country, such as the Indian Political Trilogy, and the Indian Gangster Trilogy; film critic Rajeev Masand had labelled the latter series as one of the "most influential movies of Indian cinema. The first installment of the trilogy, Satya, was also listed in CNN-IBN's 100 greatest Indian films of all time, fetching Varma the "Bimal Roy Award" for Best Direction. Varma fetched the National Film Award for scripting and producing the political crime drama, Shool (1999) cited by India Today as the "Best Cop Movie" of the 90's. His recent avant-garde works include hits such as the dramatised re-enactment of "Rayalaseema factionism" in Rakta Charitra (2010), the "2008 Mumbai attacks" in The Attacks of 26/11 (2013), the "Operation Cocoon" in Killing Veerappan (2016), the "Vijayawada riots" in Vangaveeti (2016), N. T. R. in Lakshmi's NTR (2019), and Konda politics in Konda (2022).

== Early life and background ==
Penmetsa Ram Gopal Varma was born on 7 April 1962 into a Telugu family in Hyderabad, Andhra Pradesh (now in Telangana), to Krishnam Raju Varma and Suryavathi. According to Varma, he was born in the Nampally locality of Hyderabad. He completed his schooling at St. Mary's High School, Secunderabad, and pursued his intermediate education at New Science College, Ameerpet, Hyderabad.

Varma obtained a Bachelor of Engineering degree in Civil Engineering from V. R. Siddhartha Engineering College, Vijayawada, which is affiliated with Acharya Nagarjuna University. During his college years, Varma developed a keen interest in films. He has stated in multiple interviews that he often skipped classes to watch movies and would rewatch particular scenes repeatedly to analyse the direction and camerawork. He later cited this as an informal part of his education in filmmaking.

Before entering the film industry, Varma operated a video rental store in Hyderabad, where he claims to have studied audience preferences by observing which films were rented most frequently. This period, according to Varma, helped shape his understanding of mainstream tastes and film narrative techniques.

== Film career, craft and style ==
After a brief stint as a site engineer for Krishna Oberoi hotel in Hyderabad, he put his dreams on the back burner and decided to go to Nigeria to make some money. It was at this moment that he visited a video rental library in Hyderabad. He loved the idea and decided to start one of his own at Ameerpet in Hyderabad, through which he slowly developed connections with the film world. His father at that time was a long time sound engineer at Annapurna Studios. After working as an assistant director in Collector Gari Abbai and Rao Gari Illu, Akkineni Nageswara Rao gave him the opportunity to direct the 1989 cult blockbuster, Siva, after being impressed by him.

=== International acclaim ===
Rachel Dwyer, a reader in world cinema at the University of London-Department of South Asia, marked Varma's Satya as an experiment with a new genre, a variation of film noir that has been called Mumbai Noir, of which Varma is the acknowledged master. In 2010, Varma received critical acclaim at the Fribourg International Film Festival, Switzerland; a retrospective of his filmography, highlighting Mumbai Noir was staged by film critic Edouard Waintrop, a delegate in the Directors' Fortnight of the Cannes Film Festival. Satya and Company, in particular, were cited by British director Danny Boyle as influences on his Academy Award-winning film Slumdog Millionaire (2008), for their "slick, often mesmerizing portrayals of the Mumbai underworld", their display of "brutality and urban violence", and their gritty realism.

In 2005, Varma directed the Godfatheresque-Sarkar, another super-hit thriller inspired by the life of Bal Thackeray and North Indian politics, which was screened to special mention at the New York Asian Film Festival, along with its sequel Sarkar Raj, which premiered at the 2008 Cannes Film Festival and the 9th IIFA World Premiere-Bangkok, and was archived at the Academy of Motion Pictures library. In 2013, he directed a docudrama, The Attacks of 26/11, showcased to critical acclaim at the Berlin International Film Festival, in the Panorama as well as the Competition section, and was premièred at Films Division of India. The film received highly positive reviews, with critics praising Varma's narrative of assistant commissioner N. R. Mahale, and the discrepancies associated with Mahale's interaction with Ajmal Kasab on anti terrorism.

=== Influences ===
Varma's philosophy is influenced by Russian-American Novelist Ayn Rand, Philosopher Friedrich Nietzsche and authors like James Hadley Chase and Frederick Forsyth, as well as by Mad magazine. Varma's first runaway hit in Hindi cinema was Shiva (1990), the remake of his 1989 film Siva. Varma introduced the steadicam to Indian cinema with Siva. Later, he garnered attention in Bollywood with the romantic comedy film, Rangeela (1995) starring Aamir Khan. The film won seven Filmfare Awards. Rangeela was later remade in Hollywood as Win a Date with Tad Hamilton!.

He then directed Satya (1998), which won six Filmfare Awards, including the Critics Award for Best Film, In 2005, Indiatimes Movies included Satya in its list of 25 Must See Bollywood Movies. Satya was showcased among the Indian panorama section, at the 1998 International Film Festival of India, Varma received the Bimal Roy memorial award for best direction for this film. In the same year, he co-produced Dil Se.., directed by Mani Ratnam, screened at the 1999 Berlin Film Festival, and won the Netpac Award, as well as two National Film Awards and six Filmfare Awards. Satya, together with his 2002 film Company (which he directed, won three IIFA Awards, seven Filmfare Awards, and a Bollywood Movie Award for best direction, and was premiered at the 2004 Austin Film Festival) and the 2005 film D (which he produced), were also featured in the Fribourg International Film Festival, and the New York Asian Film Festival.

=== Experimental films ===
In the early 1990s, Varma experimented with the supernatural thriller, Raat (1991), and the neo-noir crime thriller, Drohi (1992), which were not commercially successful, but gained a cult following post-release. During the years between his trilogy, from Satya in 1998 to D in 2005, Varma implemented different film genres in his craft. In 1999, he directed Kaun, a suspense thriller set entirely in one house and featuring only three actors, and Mast, a subversion of Hindi cinema's masala genre. In 2000, he directed Jungle, set entirely in a jungle, for which he was nominated for the Star Screen Award for Best Director. In 2003 he directed another supernatural thriller Bhoot on the lines of his earlier hit Raat. Bhoot became a major hit at the box office, and Varma was nominated for the Filmfare Best Director Award for the film.

Bhoot was followed by even more horror movies, including hit films such as Darna Mana Hai (2003), Darna Zaroori Hai (2006), and Phoonk (2008), gaining Varma the status of ster of the Indian horror genre. Other experimental productions of Varma include Ek Hasina Thi (2003), a psychological thriller, and Ab Tak Chhappan (2004), a film about an inspector in the Mumbai Encounter Squad noted for having killed 56 people in encounters, featured at the Fantastic Fest. In 2006, he re-made a new instla of Shiva, which was screened at the New York Asian Film Festival, where a retrospective featuring Varma's experimental hits such as Company, Ek Hasina Thi, Ab Tak Chhappan, Sarkar, Contract, and Shabri was staged. Shabri was also screened at Rome Film Festival. The 2010 film on media, Rann was screened at Toronto International Film Festival. A two-part bilingual Parallel cinema Rakta Charitra (2010), on the theme of South Indian politics, was based on the life of Paritala Ravindra, and Maddela Cheruvu Suri; the film received praise from critics.

=== Mainstream films ===
Varma started his career in the Telugu film industry as an assistant director on the sets of films such as Collector Gari Abbai and Rao Gari Illu. His father Krishnam Raju Varma, was a sound recordist at the Annapurna Studios. Varma met Nagarjuna Akkineni at the studio and narrated a scene to the actor which impressed him. The result of their collaboration was a film on the criminalisation of student politics – Siva. It was a commercially successful film that gave Varma an opportunity to demonstrate his technical expertise and story telling skills.

Kshana Kshanam with Venkatesh, Gaayam with Jagapathi Babu and Anaganaga Oka Roju with J.D. Chakravarthy were successful; Govinda Govinda with Nagarjuna proved to be a moderate success at the box office. During this period, Varma produced films such as Money (1993), Money Money (1994), and Gulabi (1995). Other films by Varma in Telugu include Deyyam (1996), Prema Katha (1999), Madhyanam Hathya (2004), Katha Screenplay Darsakatvam Appalaraju (2011), Rowdy (2014), Ice Cream (2014), and Anukshanam (2014). Varma introduced online auction based film distribution model for this venture, and tasted success.

Varma's notable mainstream works in Hindi cinema include Daud (1997), Darna Zaroori Hai (2006), Nishabd (2007), Darling (2007), and Phoonk (2008). Bollywood film makers such as Anurag Kashyap, Madhur Bhandarkar, Puri Jagannadh, E. Nivas, Prawaal Raman, Krishna Vamsi, and Vishram Sawant assisted Varma, before venturing into direction. In 1993, he scripted the Tamil thriller Thiruda Thiruda, screened at Toronto International Film Festival. In 2015, Varma was fined for Rs 10 Lakhs, for an alleged copyright violation with the film Aag (2007). He made his directorial debut in Kannada cinema with the thriller Killing Veerappan. In 2023, Ram Gopal Varma announced his retirement from political filmmaking, declaring 'Shapadham' as his final project.

== Other work ==
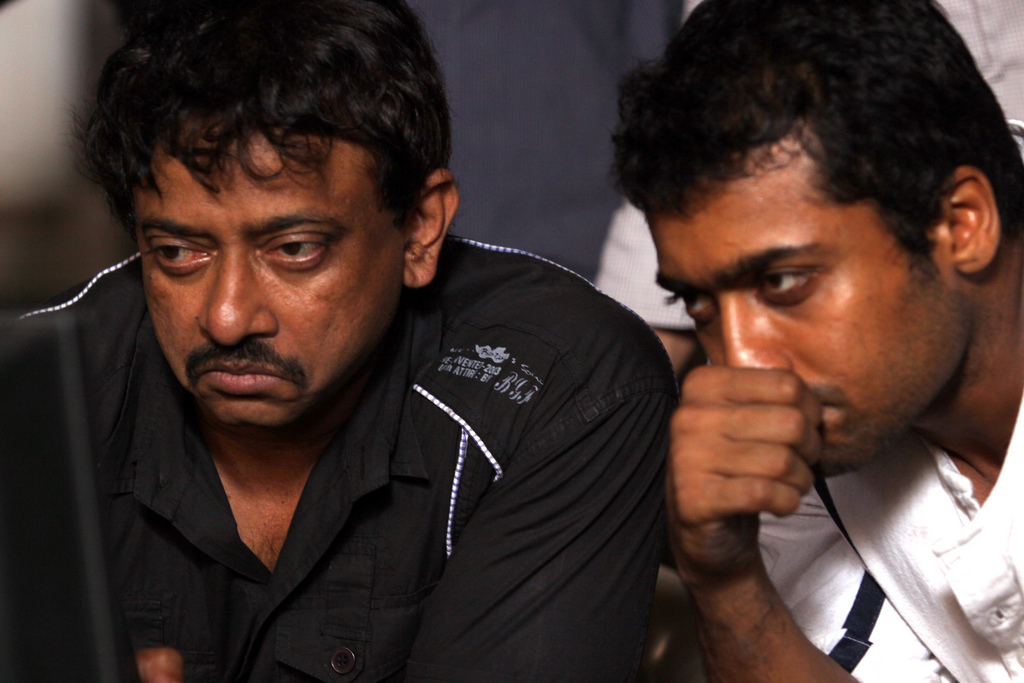
Ram Gopal Varma with Suriya on the sets of Rakta Charitra 2

=== Television ===
Ram Gopal Varma made his début in Television through a Talk Show titled Ramuism. The show is being aired on a Telugu channel since September 2014. The show is noted for its fresh and witty appeal. The show focuses on Varma's Point of View on social issues such as Education, Religion, Mythology, Children, Crime, Death, Anger, Godmen, Woman, Philosophy, Cinema etc. The show is hosted by Swapna, the managing editor of Sakshi TV.

=== Online media ===
He has also made a documentary called God, Sex and Truth with adult actress Mia Malkova.

=== Biographies ===
Varma wrote an autobiography titled Na Ishtam ("As I Please"), which discusses his life experiences and philosophy. 'Naa Ishtam' was released in December 2010 at Taj Banjara, Hyderabad. Sirasri, poet, lyricist and writer wrote a biographical book on the interactions he had with Ram Gopal Varma with the title Vodka With Varma. Director Puri Jagannadh launched the book in December 2012.

In November 2015, Varma published his book Guns and Thighs: The Story of My Life, which discusses a wide range of subjects, from the influences and circumstances that drew him to cinematic techniques, his successful and unsuccessful films, his Hindi cinema idols, his live-in relationship with Suchitra Krishnamoorthi, his relationship with the media and the controversies dogging him, his philosophy of life, and Indian cinema. On this occasion, Varma said "I dedicated my book to Ayn Rand, Bruce Lee, Urmila Matondkar, Amitabh Bachchan, and a few gangsters."

== Personal life ==
Varma was married to Ratna, whom he later divorced. They have a daughter who is a classical dancer.

== Controversies ==
On 21 October 2025, Ram Gopal was slammed for posting an "insensitive" tweet from his verified Twitter handle on Diwali by comparing the situation in Gaza with Diwali festivities, where he wrote "In INDIA only one day is DIWALI and in GAZA, every day is DIWALI", while the situation in Gaza has been described by leading human rights organisations as a genocide.

=== Legal issues ===
In January 2025, Varma was convicted by a Mumbai court in a cheque bounce case and sentenced to three months of simple imprisonment. The case, originating 2018, was filed by a company named Shree, represented by Maheshchandra Mishra, under Section 138 of the Negotiable Instruments Act.

Varma was also ordered to pay a compensation of ₹3.72 lakh to the complainant within three months, failing which he would face an additional three months of imprisonment. Varma was absent during the proceedings, leading to a non-bailable warrant for his arrest.

== Awards ==
Year	Award	Category	Work	Result	Ref.
1989	Nandi Awards	Best Direction	Siva	Won	
1989	Nandi Awards	Best First Film of a Director	Siva	Won	
1989	Filmfare Awards South	Best Film – Telugu	Siva	Won	
1991	Nandi Awards	Best Direction	Kshana Kshanam	Won	
1991	Nandi Awards	Best Screenplay Writer	Kshana Kshanam	Won	
1993	Nandi Awards	Best Direction	Gaayam	Won	
1996	Filmfare Awards	Best Story	Rangeela	Won	
1999	Nandi Awards	Best Direction	Prema Katha	Won	
1999	Filmfare Awards	Best Film	Satya	Won	

== Recognition ==
Ram Gopal Varma's films marked a departure from conventional Indian cinema's song-and-dance dominated narratives toward gritty realism, particularly in depictions of urban crime and gangster life. Varma is recognised a pioneer of new age Indian cinema., was featured in the BBC World series Bollywood Bosses in 2004. In 2006, Grady Hendrix of Film Comment, published by the Film at Lincoln Center cited Varma as "Bombay's Most Successful Maverick" for his works on experimental films.

Several successful film directors such as Puri Jagannadh, SS Rajamouli, Anurag Kashyap, Aditya Dhar and Sandeep Reddy Vanga have cited Varma's influence on their works.

== See also ==
- Gangster (franchise)
