= K Sera Sera Limited =

Indian media company

KSS Limited (formerly known as K Sera Sera Limited)
- Type: Public
- Traded as: BSE: 532081; NSE: KSERASERA
- Founded: 1 January 1993 (Private); 20 December 1999 (Public)
- Founder: Mr. Satish Panchariya (CMD)
- Headquarters: Mumbai, Maharashtra, India
- Area served: Worldwide
- Owner: Mr. Satish Panchariya (CMD)
- Website: www.kserasera.com

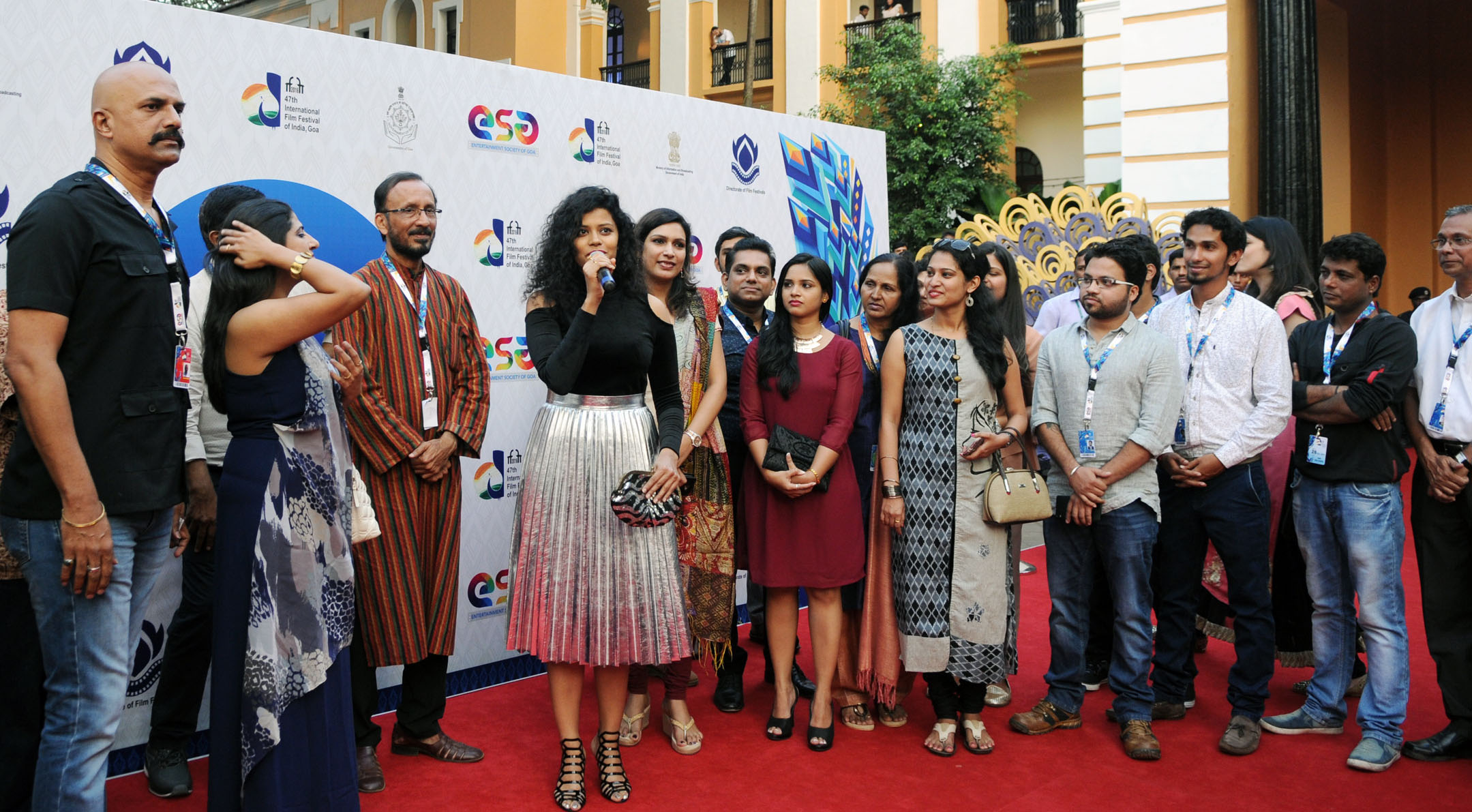
The cast and crew of ‘K Sera Sera’ at the red carpet, during the 47th International Film Festival of India (IFFI-2016), in Panaji, Goa on November 26, 2016

KSS Limited (formerly known as K Sera Sera Limited) is a media company based in Mumbai, India. KSS is a publicly listed company on the BSE (Bombay Stock Exchange), NSE (National Stock Exchange of India Ltd.), and was formerly listed on the Luxembourg Stock Exchange. KSS Limited operates within the entertainment industry, specifically in digital cinema deployment, Miniplex cinema screen development, and alternative content programming. The company has distributed over 100 films and produced 28.

== History ==
The organization was founded on September 14, 1995, under the name Garnet Paper Mills Limited. In 2002, it was rebranded and renamed K Sera Sera Production Limited.

In April 2011, K Sera Sera Technologies Private Limited was renamed K Sera Digital Cinema Private Limited. The company was established in 2009 and is headquartered in Mumbai, India. K Sera Sera Digital Cinema Private Limited is a subsidiary of KSS Limited.

== Filmography ==
The company has produced and distributed the following films and TV shows:

=== Films produced ===
Year	Title	Director	Writer	Producer / Presented by	Cast	Notes	Ref.
2004	Ab Tak Chhappan	Shimit Amin	Sandeep Shrivastava	Ram Gopal Varma	Nana Patekar Yashpal Sharma Nakul Vaid Prasad Purandare	Based on the life of a Police sub-inspector with the Mumbai Police force Daya Nayak, remade in Telugu as Siddham	
2004	Ek Hasina Thi	Sriram Raghavan	Sriram Raghavan; Pooja Ladha Surti	Ram Gopal Varma	Saif Ali Khan, Urmila Matondkar	Based on the elements from the Sidney Sheldon story If Tomorrow Comes and the 1999 film Double Jeopardy; adaptation is based on The Bone Collector	
2004	Gayab	Prawaal Raman	Prawaal Raman; Kona Venkat	Ram Gopal Varma	Tushar Kapoor Antara Mali	Remade in Tamil as Jithan	
2004	Naach	Ram Gopal Varma	Pooja Ladha Surti; Sulekha Bajpai; Musharaff Ali Khan	Ram Gopal Varma; Chitra Subramaniam	Abhishek Bachchan Antara Mali Ritesh Deshmukh		
2005	D: Underworld Badhshah	Vishram Sawant	Ram Gopal Varma; Manish Gupta	Ronnie Screwvala; Ram Gopal Varma	Randeep Hooda Chunky Pandey Rukhsar Rehman Isha Koppikar Yashpal Sharma Sushant Singh Goga Kapoor Ishrat Ali Nagesh Bhonsle	Third Installment in the Gangster film series	
2005	James	Rohit Jugraj	Rohit Jugraj; Kona Venkat; Manish Gupta	Ram Gopal Varma; R. R. Venkat	Mohit Ahlawat; Nisha Kothari; Zakir Hussain; Mohan Agashe; Snehal Dabi; Rajpal Yadav; Raima Sen; Rajendra Gupta; Ishat Ali; Ravi Kale		
2005	My Wife's Murder	Jiji Philip	Atul Sabharwal	Ram Gopal Varma	Anil Kapoor; Suchitra Krishnamurti; Boman Irani; Nandana Sen; Rajesh Tandon	Remake of 2004 Telugu film Madhyanam Hathya	
2006	Bhagam Bhag	Priyadarshan	Neeraj Vora	Sunil Shetty; Dhilin Mehta	Akshay Kumar; Govinda; Paresh Rawal; Lara Dutta; Rajpal Yadav; Jackie Shroff; Arbaaz Khan; Shakti Kapoor; Manoj Joshi; Razak Khan; Sharat Saxena; Asrani; Gurleen Chopra	Based on the 1995 Malayalam film Mannar Mathai Speaking, which was inspired by 1958 Alfred Hitchcock's Hollywood movie Vertigo; Plot elements were based on the 1987 Malayalam movie, Nadodikkattu; the twist climax was based on 1999 Marathi movie Bindhaast; climax scene adapted from Stanley Kramer's 1963 Hollywood movie It's a Mad, Mad, Mad, Mad World; remade in Telugu as Brahmanandam Drama Company	
2006	Golmaal: Fun Unlimited	Rohit Shetty	Neeraj Vora	Dhilin Mehta; Parag Sanghvi	Ajay Devgn; Arshad Warsi; Sharman Joshi; Tusshar Kapoor; Rimi Sen; Paresh Rawal	First Installment of Golmaal film series	
2007	Aag	Ram Gopal Varma	Sajid-Farhad	Ram Gopal Varma	Amitabh Bachchan; Mohanlal; Ajay Devgn; Sushmita Sen	Based on the Adaptation of Salim-Javed's Bollywood movie Sholay	
2007	Evano Oruvan	Nishikant Kamat	R. Madhavan; Seeman	Abbas–Mustan	Madhavan; Sangeetha; Seeman	Tamil remake of the director's Marathi movie Dombivali Fast, which was based on Michael Douglas Hollywood movie Falling Down	
2007	Nanhe Jaisalmer	Samir Karnik	Samir Karnik	K Sera Sera	Bobby Deol Dwij Yadav Vatsal Sheth		
2007	Partner	David Dhawan	David Dhawan, Yunus Sajawal, Sanjay Chhel	Sohail Khan, Parag Sanghvi	Govinda Lara Dutta Salman Khan Katrina Kaif	Based on the 2005 Hollywood film Hitch	
2007	Risk	Vishram Sawant	Vishram Sawant	K Sera Sera	Vinod Khanna; Randeep Hooda; Tanushree Dutta; Zakir Hussain	Based on the Mumbai Underworld	
2008	Sarkar Raj	Ram Gopal Varma	Prashant Pandey	Ram Gopal Varma; Praveen Neel	Amitabh Bachchan; Abhishek Bachchan; Aishwarya Rai Bachchan; Dilip Prabhavalkar; Supriya Pathak	Second Installment of Sarkar film series	
2009	Chal Chala Chal	T. K. Rajeev Kumar	T. K. Rajeev Kumar	Dharmesh Rajkotia, Manna Shetty, G.P. Vijayakumar	Govinda; Rajpal Yadav; Reema Sen; Om Puri	Remake of 1989 Malayalam film Varavelpu; scenes of this movie based on 2001 Malayalam film Ee Parakkum Thalika	
2009	Kisse Pyaar Karoon	Ajay Chandok	Yunus Sajawal	Bala Kumar	Arshad Warsi; Aashish Chaudhary; Yash Tonk; Udita Goswami; Aarti Chhabria	Basic plot is lifted from the Hollywood film Saving Silverman which, in turn, was also the main theme of the 2008 Bollywood movie De Taali	
2012	Life Ki Toh Lag Gayi	Rakesh Mehta	Rakesh Mehta	Rakesh Mehta	Ranvir Shorey; Kay Kay Menon Manu Rishi Jackie Shroff; Neha Bhasin; Neeraj Vora; Sharat Saxena; Tom Alter Asrani		
2015	Ghayal: Once Again	Sunny Deol	Sunny Deol	Dharmendra; Jay Dev Banerjee	Sunny Deol; Om Puri; Shivam Patil; Rishabh Arora; Abhilash Kumar; Neha Khan; Aanchal Munjal; Soha Ali Khan; Narendra Jha	Sequel to 1990 Bollywood film Ghayal	
2017	Romeo-N-Bullet	Aditya Kumar	Vishal Kumar Patil	Aditya Kumar	Vije Bhatia Aradhya Taing Rishi Verma		
2022	Judaa Hoke Bhi	Vikram Bhatt	Mahesh Bhatt	K Sera Sera Longranger Production Pvt. Ltd.	Akshay Oberoi Aindrita Ray Meherzan Mazda Jiya Mustafa Rushad Rana		
2022	Holy Cow	Sai Kabir		K Sera Sera YS Entertainment	Sanjai Mishra Tigmanshu Dhulia Nawazuddin Siddiqui		
2022	Modi Ji Ki Beti	Eddy Singh	Tripurari Avni Modi Eddy Singh	K Sera Sera An E Creatives	Avni Modi Pitobash Tripathi Vikram Kochhar Tarun Khanna Eddy Singh		

=== Films distributed ===
Year	Title	Director	Writer	Producer	Cast	Production Company	Notes	Ref
2003	Darna Mana Hai	Prawaal Raman	Atul Sabharwal; Rajnish Thakur; Abbas Tyrewala	Ram Gopal Varma	Nana Patekar; Vivek Oberoi; Saif Ali Khan; Boman Irani; Sanjay Kapoor; Shilpa Shetty; Sohail Khan; Antara Mali; Sameera Reddy; Rajpal Yadav; Aftab Shivdasani; Isha Koppikar; Peeya Rai Chowdhary; Revathi; Raghuvir Yadav; Gaurav Kapur; Kiku Sharda; Abir Goswami	K Sera Sera Productions		
2004	Vaastu Shastra	Saurab Narang	Charu Du Acharya	Ram Gopal Varma	Peeya Rai Chowdhary; J. D. Chakravarthy; Sushmita Sen	K Sera Sera Productions	Dubbed in Telugu as Marri Chettu	
2005	No Entry	Anees Bazmee	Anees Bazmee	Boney Kapoor	Salman Khan; Anil Kapoor; Fardeen Khan; Bipasha Basu; Esha Deol; Lara Dutta; Celina Jaitly	SK Film Entertainment	Remake of 2002 Tamil film Charlie Chaplin	
2005	Sarkar	Ram Gopal Varma	Manish Gupta	Ram Gopal Varma; Parag Sanghvi	Amitabh Bachchan; Abhishek Bachchan; Kay Kay Menon; Supriya Pathak; Katrina Kaif; Tanisha Mukherjee; Anupam Kher; Kota Srinivasa Rao	RGV Film Company	First installment of Sarkar	
2006	Darna Zaroori Hai	Sajid Khan; Ram Gopal Varma; Prawaal Raman; Vivek Shah; Jiji Philip; J. D. Chakravarthy; Manish Gupta	Sajid Khan; Prawaal Raman; Ashish Deo; Nikhil Mishra; Manish Gupta	Satish Kaushik; Ram Gopal Varma	Amitabh Bachchan; Anil Kapoor; Sunil Shetty; Arjun Rampal; Riteish Deshmukh; Bipasha Basu; Randeep Hooda; Mallika Sherawat; Rajpal Yadav; Sonali Kulkarni; Makarand Deshpande	RGV Film Company	First installment of Darna Mana Hai	
2006	I See You	Vivek Agrawal	Vivek Agrawal	Mehr Jesia	Arjun Rampal; Vipasha Agrawal	Chasing Ganesha Films	Based on the novel If Only It Were True (Et si c'était vrai...) by Marc Levy; elements from the Malayalam film Vismayathumbathu, 2005 Hollywood film Just Like Heaven, and debut film of Vipasha Agrawal	
2009	Ek: The Power of One	Sangeeth Sivan	Trivikram Srinivas	Jasswant Khera	Bobby Deol; Nana Patekar; Shriya Saran	Dharam Films	Remake of 2005 Telugu film Athadu	
2010	332 Mumbai to India	Mahesh Pandey	Chirag Jain	Sangeeth Sivan	Amitriyaan; Ali Asgar; Chetan Pandit; Vijay Mishra; Sharbani Mukherjee	Sangeeth Sivan Productions		

=== Television ===
Year	Show	Network	Ref(s)
2004	Kuchh Love Kuchh Masti	Sahara One	
2005	Kasshish	Zee TV	
