= Ru Ba Ru =

- Directed by: Arjun Bali
- Written by: Soumik Sen; Anvita Dutt Guptan
- Story by: Christina Welsh
- Based on: If Only by Gil Junger
- Produced by: Shailendra Singh; Mahesh Ramanathan
- Starring: Randeep Hooda; Shahana Goswami
- Cinematography: Andre Menezes
- Edited by: Sanjib Datta
- Music by: Satyadev Barman; Ranjit Barot; Sameer Uddin
- Production company: Percept Picture Company
- Distributed by: Percept Picture Company
- Release date: 12 September 2008
- Running time: 120 minutes
- Country: India
- Language: Hindi

Ru Ba Ru is a 2008 Indian Hindi-language romantic drama film directed by Arjun Bali. The film revolves around the relationship between a live-in couple caught amidst their busy professional careers. It stars Randeep Hooda and Shahana Goswami in the lead roles. Rati Agnihotri, Kulbhushan Kharbanda and Jayant Kripalani play supporting roles. This film is an adaptation of If Only (2004).

== Plot ==
Tara Mishra (Shahana Goswami), an aspiring actress and singer, and Nikhil Singh (Randeep Hooda), a young professional in an advertising firm have been in a relationship for a few years. Kulbhushan Kharbanda is a taxi driver.

Tara wants to cement their relationship by having him meet her parents as a commitment to marriage. But Nikhil, who is a workaholic and professionally ambitious, is always pre-occupied with his work. Saying that he is happy with the way things are between the two of them, he stashes away her proposal for marriage.

Trouble brews between them when Nikhil constantly forgets little things about her and their relationship. He begins to take Tara, her family and friends for granted. When Tara cannot take this behavior of Nikhil anymore, she decides to take matters in her own hand. That's when a strange magical, mystical force intervenes, and what happens next forms the rest of the story.

Tara is hit by a taxi, and dies in the hospital. Nikhil is left helpless and sobbing. However, the next morning, he finds Tara lying on the bed besides him alive! This makes him realise that he's been given a second chance to patch up and rectify his mistakes. All is well, until at the end another tragedy occurs, and that is the taxi got hit by another vehicle.

== Cast ==
- Randeep Hooda as Nikhil "Nick" Singh
- Shahana Goswami as Tara Mishra / Ms. Ria
- Kulbhushan Kharbanda as Taxi Driver
- Rati Agnihotri as Meera Singh, Nikhil's mother
- Jayant Kripalani as Dilip Khandelwal, Nikhil's step-father
- Avinesh Rekhi as Wedding Singer
- Jeneva Talwar as Nadia Hassan
- Jeetu Savlani as Jay Rajput, Nikhil's friend
- Prince Shah as Tybalt

== Production ==
Debutant director Arjun Bali previously worked on advertisements before venturing into commercial cinema. Randeep Hooda, who had previously worked in action films such as D (2005) and Risk (2007), thought of experimenting with a romantic film hoping that it might bring him the much elusive success in the Bollywood film industry. When Bali approached Hooda with the film's story, the latter instantly liked the title. The film was titled Ru Ba Ru, which transliterates into soul to soul, with actress-model Mandira Bedi's suggestion. For the film, Hooda shaved his moustache away as he "wanted to look soft and romantic." While saying that his character in the film was quite similar to his real life persona, Hooda thought it was great working with relative newcomer Shahana Goswami. Goswami previously featured in Yun Hota Toh Kya Hota (2006), Honeymoon Travels Pvt. Ltd. (2007) and Rock On!! (2008), the former two being cameo appearances. She was signed on for this film before her graduation. The characters she portrays in Rock On!! and this film were strikingly similar. Due to this, she was worried that this might typecast her in her future films.

== Reception ==
The Economic Times gave 2 out of 5 stars writing "Ru-Ba-Ru literally translates in English as face-to-face. The film confronts the original source with equivalent impudence when it comes to imitation". Nithya Ramani of Rediff.com gave 1 out of 5 stars and wrote "Director Arjun Chandramohan Bali's Ru Ba Ru tries to portray what happens in a relationship when you do not express your love to each other from time to time. As Randeep Hooda and Sahana Goswami go through the motions on screen, you may sense a feeling of deja vu if you have watched the Hollywood film, If Only, starring Jennifer Love Hewitt".
