= Rang Rasiya =

2014 Indian film

- Theatrical release poster
- Directed by: Ketan Mehta
- Written by: Ketan Mehta
- Based on: Raja Ravi Varma by Ranjit Desai
- Produced by: Deepa Sahi; Aanand Mahendroo
- Starring: Randeep Hooda; Nandana Sen
- Cinematography: Rali Raltschev; Christo Bakalov
- Edited by: Pratik Chitalia
- Music by: Sandesh Shandilya
- Production companies: Maya Movies; Infinity Filmed Entertainment; Pen Studios
- Release dates: November 2008 (London Film Festival); 7 November 2014 (India)
- Country: India
- Languages: Hindi; English
- Budget: ₹12 crore

Rang Rasiya, titled Colours of Passion in English, is a 2008 Indian drama film written and directed by Ketan Mehta, based on the life of the 19th century Indian painter Raja Ravi Varma. It was released bilingually in Hindi as Rang Rasiya and in English as Colours of Passion. The film was a cinematic adaptation of the novel Raja Ravi Varma by Ranjit Desai. It stars Randeep Hooda as Raja Ravi Varma and Nandana Sen as his love interest.

Colours of Passion was released at The Times BFI London Film Festival in November 2008. Rang Rasiya was theatrically released in India on 7 November 2014.

== Cast ==
- Randeep Hooda as Raja Ravi Varma
- Nandana Sen as Sugandha
- Gaurav Dwivedi as Raj Varma
- Vipin Sharma as Paachan
- Paresh Rawal as Seth Govardhan Das
- Jim Boeven as Fritz Schleicher
- Feryna Wazheir as Frenny
- Rashaana Shah as Kaamini
- Darshan Jariwala as Chintamani Maharaj
- Suhasini Mulay as Sugandha's mother Bakubai
- Sachin Khedekar as Dewanji Madhavrao
- Triptha Parashar as Poorutarthy
- Vikram Gokhale as Keshav Shastri
- Sri Vallabh Vyas as Sugandha's father Hirachand
- Tom Alter as Justice Richards
- Ashish Vidyarthi as Raja Thirunal
- Rajat Kapoor as Auctioneer
- Shamim Ahmed Shaikh as Old Man Praying

== Production ==
=== Development ===
After his last commercial production Mangal Pandey: The Rising (2005), Mehta chose to make a film on the 19th-century painter, Raja Ravi Varma's life. Incidentally both these movies were based on a subject from the 19th century. Rang Rasiya is an adaptation of the biographical novel Raja Ravi Varma authored by the Marathi writer Ranjit Desai.

Mehta thought that Varma was the most fascinating artist of that era and his character, persona and paintings. He was fascinated with Ravi Varma right from his days at Film and Television Institute of India. After reading Desai's novel, Mehta felt inspired to make a film based on the life and times of Ravi Varma, and set about formulating the story of his new film.

=== Cast and crew ===
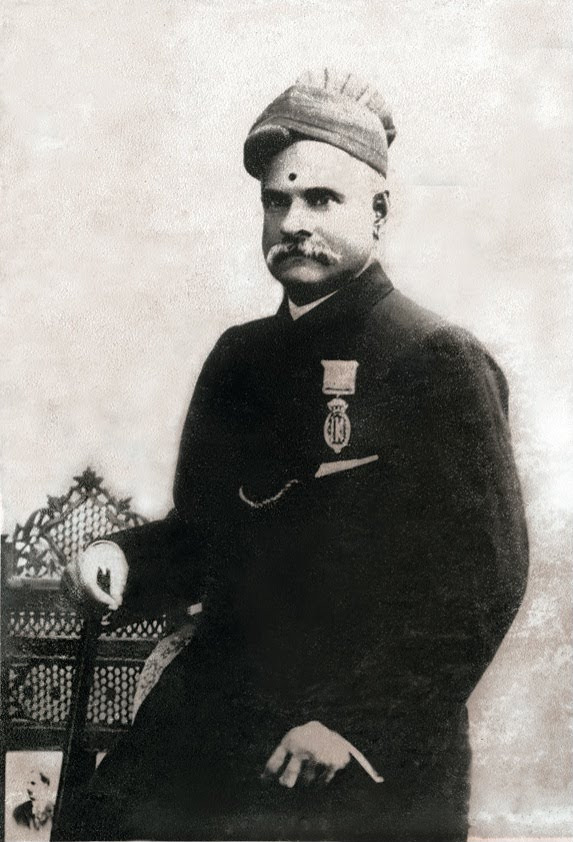
Raja Ravi Varma

When Mehta first met Nandana Sen at her house, he saw two life-size reproductions of Raja Ravi Varma's paintings. This indicated to him that she was familiar with the artist and his works, something that he thought would make his job as a director easier. Speaking of the character she was to portray, he said:

"To me, she was the perfect woman to play the muse of an artist who sparked off debates about censorship of art. She has that child-woman quality, which was so much a part of Sugandha's personality."

The much desired controversy regarding "censorship of art" was quickly forthcoming, and Nandana was the willing lynchpin of that achievement. Among several scenes in the film that depict her in various grades of undress, one wide angle shot shows the bare breasts of a skimpily clad Nandana. The Central Board of Film Certification, which regulates the ratings and certification of media in India, duly objected to the scene, terming it nudity.

Mehta saw Hooda's previous films Risk and D. In this film, he played the role of Raja Ravi Varma in two phases — first as a 60-year-old and then as a 20-year-old in a span of 10 days. As a preparation for his role, Hooda tried to learn the basics of painting. He was happy working in the film and said that his acting skills were well-groomed by Mehta's abilities.

Paresh Rawal plays an important role in the film. Triptha Parashar, whom Mehta spotted in an advertisement, was immediately offered the role of a princess without auditioning. Feryna Wazheir, who was born and raised in the UK to Kashmiri parents, plays a Parsi girl in the film.

Sangita Kathiwada is the creative consultant and Niharika Khan, the award-winning designer is the costume designer.

== Soundtrack ==
The soundtrack of Rang Rasiya is composed by Sandesh Shandilya and lyrics are written by Manoj Muntashir

=== Track listing ===
No.	Title	Singer(s)	Length
1.	"Rang Rasiya (title)"	Sunidhi Chauhan, Keerthi Sagathia	4:01
2.	"Kahe Sataye"	Roop Kumar Rathod, Sunidhi Chauhan	3:57
3.	"O Kamini"	Sonu Nigam,	3:39
4.	"Anhad Naad"	Kailash Kher, Anwar Khan	4:38
5.	"Sun Balam"	Rajashwari Pathak	3:56
6.	"Rang Rasiya (Re-mix )"		5:15
Total length:			24:06

== Release ==
The film was screened at 2008 The Times BFI London Film Festival. Rang Rasiya had been languishing in post-production from 2008 due to the Censor Board's objection with certain scenes that involved nudity. It was given a release date on 7 November 2014.

== Reception ==
=== Box office ===
The film, made on a budget of ₹12 crore reportedly grossed ₹4.8 crore in India.

=== Critical response ===
Shubhra Gupta of The Indian Express gave the film two out of five, calling it a "choppy costume drama marred by false notes and static acting." Derek Elley of Variety wrote, "Choppy narrative checks all the boxes but lacks a broad dramatic arc, and Varma comes across as an unsympathetic, self-centered character."

== See also ==
- Makaramanju
