= Mahankali (film) =

- Official poster
- Directed by: Jeevitha Rajasekhar
- Written by: Writer Mohan (dialogues)
- Screenplay by: Rajasekhar
- Produced by: Yeluru Surendra Reddy; Parandhama Reddy
- Starring: Rajasekhar
- Cinematography: Madhu A. Naidu
- Edited by: Murali Gurappa
- Music by: Chinna
- Release date: 8 March 2013
- Running time: 129 minutes
- Country: India
- Language: Telugu

Mahankali is a 2013 Indian Telugu-language action drama film directed by Jeevitha Rajasekhar starring her husband Rajasekhar in the title role.

The film was released on 8 March 2013. The film was dubbed into Tamil as Ithu Thaanda Police 2. The film is based on Risk (2007) by Vishram Sawant.

== Cast ==
- Rajasekhar as Mahankali
- Madhurima as Tanisha
- Pradeep Rawat as Harshad Bhai
- Kalakeya Prabhakar as Nayak Bhai
- Chalapathi Rao as Anand Rao (Police Commissioner)
- Nalini as Jayalakshmi alias Jayakka (Politician), Harshad's Proxy
- Supreeth Reddy as Reddy
- Vinod Kumar Alva as DCP
- Salim Panda as Salim
- Chatrapathi Sekhar as Ramakrishna alias RK
- Satya Prakash as Laddu
- Narsing Yadav as Raheem
- Suthi Velu

== Production ==
While shooting a chase sequence, Rajasekhar was severely injured and the film's shoot was halted. The delay of the film shoot by the director reportedly increased the cost of the film. Home Minister Sabitha Indra Reddy attended the film's trailer launch as the chief guest.

== Soundtrack ==
The music was composed by Chinna.

- "Oo La La" - K. S. Chithra
- "Premounno" - Kumar Sanu, Sunitha
- "Maguvala Marman" - S. P. Balasubrahmanyam, Shreya Ghoshal
- "Kichaka Vaadaa" - P. Unnikrishnan, Bhavatharini
- "Trigger Nokadam" - S. P. Balasubrahmanyam

== Release and reception ==
The film was initially scheduled for release in February 2013.

Sushil Rao of The Times of India rated the film two out of five stars and said that "Killing. Killing. And killing. That is the only thing that happens all through the movie". A critic from 123 Telugu said that "Mahankaali is a routine and boring cop saga". Bojja Kumar of Filmibeat said that the film is only for Rajasekhar fans.
