= Ranjit Desai =

Indian writer (1928–1992)

- Born: Ranjit Ramchandra Desai; 8 April 1928; Kowad, Kolhapur, Maharashtra, India
- Died: 6 March 1992 (aged 63); Mumbai, Maharashtra, India
- Occupations: Novelist, Writer
- Awards: Sahitya Akademi Award (1964); Padma Shri (1973)

Ranjit Ramchandra Desai (8 April 1928 – 6 March 1992) was an Indian Marathi-language writer from Maharashtra, India. He is best known for his historical novels Swami and Shriman Yogi. He was awarded the Sahitya Akademi Award in 1964 and the Padma Shri in 1973.

== Works ==
Desai's most prominent creations are "Swami" and "Shriman Yogi". His other works are as below.

=== Novels ===
- Radheya - A Story narrating the life of 'Karna' - The Eldest of all Pandav's and his tyranny.
- Swami - Received Sahitya Akademi award
- Shriman Yogi - Based on Shivaji I
- Baari
- Raja Ravi Varma
- Pavankhind
- Lakshavedh
- Maza Gaon
- Shekara
- Pratiksha
- Abhogi
- Samidha

=== Collections of short stories ===
- Roop Mahal
- Madhumati
- Jaan
- Kanav
- Gandhali
- Aalekh
- Kamodini
- Morpankhi Sawalya
- Katal
- Babulmora
- Sanket
- Prapat
- Megh
- Vaishakh
- Ashadh
- Mekh Mogari
- Sneha Dhara

=== Plays ===
- Kanchan Mrug
- Dhan Apure
- Pankh Zale Vairi
- Sangeet Samrat Tansen
- Garud Zep
- Ram Shashtri
- Shriman Yogi
- Swami
- Warasa
- Pangulgada
- Lok Nayak
- He Bandh Reshmache
- Tuzi Wat Wegali
- Sawali Unnhachi

=== Movie scripts ===
- Rangalya Ratri Ashya
- Sawal Maza Aika
- Nagin
- Sangoli Rayana
- Rang Rasiya

== Awards ==
- Maharashtra Rajya Award (1963) (for Swami)
- Hari Narayan Apte Award (1963) (for Swami)
- Sahitya Akademi Award (1964) (for Swami)
- Padma Shri from the Government of India (1973)
- Maharashtra Gaurav Puraskar (1990)
