= Feryna Wazheir =

British actress

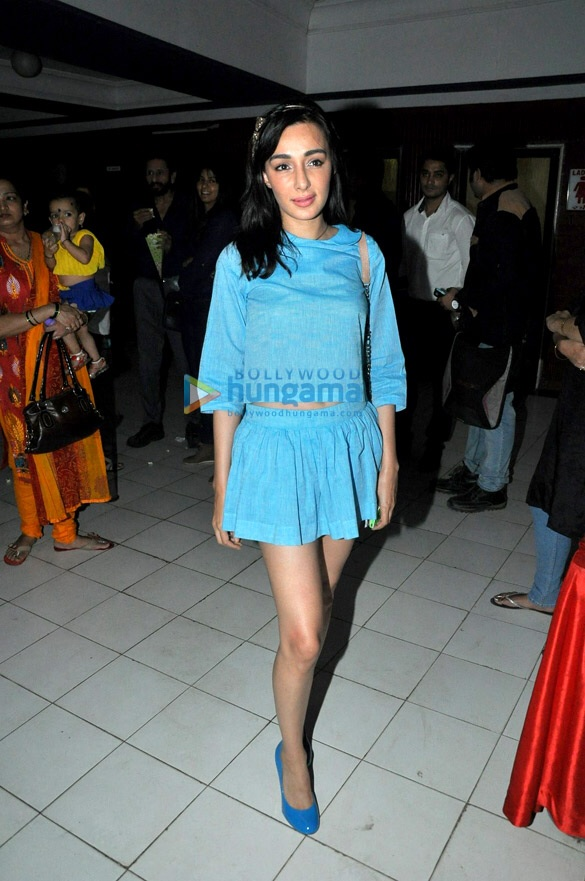
- Feryna Wazheir in special screening of Kill Dil
- Born: Glasgow, Scotland
- Occupation: Actress
- Years active: 2008–present

Feryna Wazheir is a British actress. She began her acting career in amateur theatre and made her break in the industry after she was discovered by Indian photographer Farrokh Chothia.

Feryna has been a part of Bollywood films; Ketan Mehta's Rang Rasiya with Randeep Hooda, Raj Kanwar's Sadiyaan opposite Shatrugan Sinha's son Luv Sinha and Rekha, Rishi Kapoor and Hema Malini. Wazheir was also the brand ambassador of Kolkata jewellery brand, P.C. Chandra Jewellers, for two years. She also played the character of "Tasneem" in the 2016 film Airlift alongside Akshay Kumar and Nimrat Kaur. She recently acted in a short British film titled as A Secret Heart by director Cary Sawhney. In this film, she is essaying the role of a British Jewish girl from World War 2.

== Early life ==
Feryna was born into an Indian family in Glasgow, Scotland.

She took part in amateur theatre and voice-overs and also performed in the play The Vagina Monologues by playwright Eve Ensler. At university, Feryna studied film communication and cultural studies. During a vacation to India, Feryna was spotted by photographer Farookh Chotia who used her in shoots for Elle India, Seventeen and L'Officiel.

Feryna has since trained and worked under Satyadev Dubey and Alyque Padamsee, as well as at the Royal Academy of Dramatic Arts [RADA] in London.

== Career ==
Feryna started her career in lead roles in music videos by A. R. Rahman and Hariharan. Soon after, in 2010, she made her Bollywood debut in Sadiyaan. The late Yash Chopra, once said that she is "beauty, innocence and vulnerability personified".

Feryna then acted in Ketan Mehta's Rang Rasiya, which won the Audience Award at London Indian Film Festival in 2011 before it was released in 2014. In the film, which is based on 19th century Indian painter, Raja Ravi Varma's life, Feryna plays a journalist and the third woman in his life. Following her festival accolade, Feryna was appointed official Brand Ambassador for the London Indian Film Festival (LIFF) 2012. She reprised her role as the face of LIFF in 2013.

In 2012, Feryna also did a short British film Khaana directed by LIFF's creative director Cary Sawhney. The film explores the boundaries between home and the outside world and Feryna plays a young orthodox Muslim woman who loves the British dish of fish and chips. The film, which has toured the festival circuit in the US, won the "Future Filmmaker Award 2012" at the Palm Springs Short Film Festival 2012 and "Best Short Film" at the New York City film festival 2013.

In 2016 Feryna appeared in film Airlift as Tasneem alongside Akshay Kumar and Nimrat Kaur, set in Kuwait 1990 when Saddam Hussein invaded Kuwait. She also acted in a short British film titled as A Secret Heart by director Cary Shawney. In this film, she is seen in the role of a British Jewish girl from World War 2. The story is inspired by the British film A Matter of Life & Death, by Powell and Pressburger.

== Filmography ==
Year	Title	Role	Language
2008	Rang Rasiya	Frenny	Hindi
2012	Khaana		Hindi
2010	Sadiyaan	Chandni	Hindi
2016	Airlift	Tasneem	Hindi
2018	Manto	Nargis	Hindi
2019	Commando 3	Zaheera	Hindi
