= Dharti Kahe Pukar Ke =

Dharti Kahe Pukar Ke (lit. 'Earth Calls Out') may refer to:

- Dharti Kahe Pukar Ke (1969 film), a 1969 Indian Hindi-language film
- Dharti Kahe Pukar Ke (2006 film), a 2006 Indian Bhojpuri-language film
