= Satya (1998 film) =

1998 film by Ram Gopal Varma

- Theatrical release poster
- Directed by: Ram Gopal Verma
- Written by: Anurag Kashyap; Saurabh Shukla; Ram Gopal Varma
- Produced by: Ram Gopal Varma
- Starring: J. D. Chakravarthy; Urmila Matondkar; Manoj Bajpayee; Paresh Rawal; Aditya Srivastava; Saurabh Shukla; Shefali Shah
- Cinematography: Gerard Hooper; Mazhar Kamran
- Edited by: Apurva Asrani; Bhanodaya
- Music by: Songs: Vishal Bhardwaj; Sandeep Chowta; Background Score: Sandeep Chowta
- Release date: 3 July 1998
- Running time: 167 minutes
- Country: India
- Language: Hindi
- Budget: ₹2.5 crore
- Box office: est. ₹15 crore

Satya is a 1998 Indian Hindi-language crime film, produced and directed by Ram Gopal Varma; written by Saurabh Shukla and Anurag Kashyap. It stars J. D. Chakravarthy, Urmila Matondkar and Manoj Bajpayee, alongside Saurabh Shukla, Aditya Shrivastava, Paresh Rawal, and Shefali Shah. It is the first of Varma's Gangster trilogy about organised crime in India. The film follows Satya (Chakravarthy), an immigrant who comes to Mumbai looking for a job, befriends Bhiku Mhatre (Bajpayee) and is drawn into the Mumbai underworld.

Varma initially planned to make an action film but decided to make a film focusing on felonies after meeting some criminals. He hired Kashyap and Shukla to write the film and opted to use lesser-known actors. The soundtrack and score were composed by Vishal Bhardwaj and Sandeep Chowta, respectively, while the lyrics were written by Gulzar. Its early cinematography was done by Gerard Hooper, who was replaced by Mazhar Kamran. The film was shot in Mumbai on a budget of ₹2.5 crore (US$260,000).

Satya was released on 3 July 1998 with widespread critical acclaim, particularly for its realistic depiction of the Indian underworld and Bajpayee's performance. It was also very commercially successful, grossing ₹15 crore (US$1.6 million), and helped launch a number of careers (especially for Kashyap and Bajpayee). The film won six Filmfare Awards and a National Film Award. Manoj Bajpayee won the National Film Award for Best Supporting Actor for Satya. Over the years, Satya has been regarded as a cult film, and is considered one of the greatest films ever in Indian cinema, credited with laying the foundation for gangster films in Bollywood. It inspired several sequels like Company (2002) and D (2005), and a direct sequel, Satya 2 (2013). Danny Boyle watched Satya and Company (2002) to understand the true colour of Mumbai before he started filming his acclaimed Slumdog Millionaire. He acknowledged this in an interview.

== Plot ==
Satya arrives in Mumbai in search of employment and secures a job at a local dance bar. When a volatile criminal named Jagga throws a drink in Satya's face out of dissatisfaction, tension escalates. Soon after, Jagga's underling, Pakya, attempts to extort money from Satya, who responds by slashing Pakya's face with a razor. In retaliation, Jagga’s henchmen brutally assault Satya. Meanwhile, a parallel gang war unfolds as two gangsters, Bapu and Vitthal Manjrekar, assassinate a prominent film producer on the orders of their syndicate boss, Bhiku Mhatre. Manjrekar is apprehended during the getaway and confesses Mhatre's involvement to Inspector Khandilkar, resulting in Mhatre's arrest.

Jagga subsequently frames Satya for procuring, leading to Satya's imprisonment. In jail, Satya crosses paths with Mhatre, and the two engage in a fistfight. Impressed by Satya's resilience and lack of fear, Mhatre utilizes a corrupt lawyer, Chandrakant Mule, to secure Satya's release. Upon his release, Satya is given an apartment by Kallu Mama and meets Vidya, an aspiring singer living next door. When Manjrekar recants his confession in court, Mhatre is released as well. Backed by Mhatre, Satya guns down Jagga inside the dance bar and officially joins the gang. The syndicate targets a wealthy builder named Malhotra for extortion; however, a scheduled meeting turns into an ambush. After narrowly escaping the trap, Satya interrogates a captured assailant, who reveals the hit was ordered by Mhatre's fierce rival, Guru Narayan. Concurrently, Satya intimidates a music director into signing Vidya for a prestigious project, sparking a romantic relationship between Satya and Vidya, who remains entirely oblivious to his criminal lifestyle.

Guru Narayan returns to Mumbai to eliminate Mhatre's faction, but both syndicates are ordered to cease hostilities by Bhau Thakurdas Jhawle, an influential politician who provides protection to both gangs. Bhau warns them that a bloody gang war will jeopardize his upcoming election campaign. Secretly, Guru Narayan contacts Bhau to demand permission to execute Satya to avenge Jagga. Unaware of this backdoor deal, Mhatre agrees to a truce, but Satya convinces him that Guru Narayan must be eliminated preemptively. Satya leads a ruthless strike, wiping out Guru Narayan and his entire faction, an act that deeply alienates Bhau.

To curb the rising violence, the government appoints a ruthless new police commissioner, Amodh Shukla. Simultaneously, Bhau feigns forgiveness toward Mhatre's gang to maintain their muscle for the elections. Under Shukla's command, the police launch an aggressive encounter campaign, killing numerous gang members. At Satya's strategic suggestion, Mhatre assassinates Commissioner Shukla to terrorize the police force, successfully securing Bhau’s landslide electoral victory.

While Satya and Vidya are attending a movie theater, Pakya spots Satya and alerts the authorities. Inspector Khandilkar surrounds the cinema, locking all exits except one to trap Satya. Satya outsmarts the police by firing a blank cartridge inside the theater, triggering a massive stampede that allows him and Vidya to escape. Recognizing the danger to Vidya, Satya begs Mhatre to let him retire from the underworld. Mhatre agrees and promises to relocate the couple safely to Dubai. However, when Mhatre arrives at Bhau's villa to celebrate the election victory, Bhau betrays him, executing Mhatre on the spot as retribution for Guru Narayan’s death. While Kallu Mama and Mule manage to flee the scene, the police raid Satya's apartment. Satya is forced to escape alone, leaving a devastated Vidya behind to learn the horrific truth of his criminal identity from Khandilkar.

Satya retreats to Kallu Mama's hideout. When Mule orders Mama to execute Satya, Mama rebels and kills the lawyer instead, cementing a pact with Satya to avenge Mhatre. During a crowded Ganesh Chaturthi festival on the beach, Satya successfully assassinates Bhau but sustains critical gunshot wounds. Mama attempts to smuggle the dying Satya onto a Dubai-bound cargo ship, but Satya insists on seeing Vidya one last time. Satya arrives at her apartment and knocks frantically on the door. As Vidya tearfully refuses to open it, Khandilkar ambushes the perimeter, killing Mama inside the getaway vehicle. Satya successfully breaks down the apartment door, but Khandilkar corners him and shoots him down. Satya collapses and dies just a few inches away from Vidya.

== Cast ==
- J. D. Chakravarthy as Satya
- Urmila Matondkar as Vidya
- Manoj Bajpayee as Bhiku Mhatre
- Paresh Rawal as Police Commissioner Amod Shukla
- Saurabh Shukla as Kallu Mama
- Govind Namdeo as Thakurdas Jhawle aka 'Bhau' (Gangster turn politician)
- Makrand Deshpande as Advocate Chandrakant Mule
- Shefali Shah as Pyari Mhatre
- Raju Mavani as Guru Narayan
- Aditya Srivastava as Inspector Khandilkar
- Neeraj Vora as Music Director Ronusagar
- Rajesh Joshi as Bapu
- Sabir Masani as Yeda, Bhiku's Gang Member
- Snehal Dabi as Chander Krishnakant Khote
- Jeeva as Jagga Hyderabadi
- Jyotsna Karyekar as Vidya's Mother
- Utkarsh Mazumdar as Vidya's father
- Sanjay Mishra as Vitthal Manjrekar
- Rajeev Mehta as Lawyer Harshad Chawla
- Sushant Singh as Pakya
- Manoj Pahwa as tabela(buffalo dairy) owner
- Anupam Shyam in a special appearance as a police officer who puts Satya in jail for fake charges of procuring
- Mithilesh Chaturvedi as Builder Abhinav Malhotra
- Shishir Sharma as Head of Inquiry Committee
- Arun Bali as Home Secretary Mr. Vishal Sharma
- Jyoti Dogra as Jyoti Shukla, Amod Shukla's wife
- Banerjee as Bhau's henchman

== Production ==
=== Development ===
... It suddenly struck me that you always hear about these gangsters only when they either kill or when they die. But what do they do in between? That was the first thought which eventually resulted in Satya.

— Varma, on the film's conception

Director Ram Gopal Varma, fascinated with Mumbai, wanted to return to making action films after a long break. While he was planning the film, Varma encountered some people from the underworld and became interested in their human side. Music producer and singer Gulshan Kumar was shot dead outside the Jeeteshwar Mahadev temple in Mumbai on 12 August 1997. Varma learned about the murder from Jhamu Sughand, who had produced Rangeela. Sughand told Varma that Gulshan had awakened at about 7 am and told the producer he would meet a singer at 8 am and a friend at 8:30; he would then go to the temple and meet him afterwards. Varma then thought, "If Gulshan had woken up at 7 am, then at what time would the killer have woken up?" He then decided to make a film about gangsters and, as an Ayn Rand fan, wanted to "put Howard Roark in the underworld".

Varma had intended to leave songs out of the film, but " ... at that time it was very difficult to make a film without a song since the music companies were almost 'ruling the industry' and it was impossible to promote a song-less film". With a basic story in his mind, the director wanted Vijay Tendulkar to write the film's dialogue; he admired Tendulkar's work, particularly Ardh Satya (1983). However, Tendulkar was unable to work on Satya. The film was edited by newcomer Apurva Asrani, who edited the trailer for Daud, and Bhanodaya. Impressed by his work, Varma offered Apurva the editing position on Satya when he was nineteen years old. Varma incorporated several scenes from real life in the film including the scene were gangster Bhiku Mhatre abuses one of his dead friends over his death, asking, "how could you die?". One of his friends told him that his neighbor was a criminal whom he used to greet every day but could not guess that he was involved in crime. Varma liked this angle and used it in the film as well. Varma said that the characters in the film "are at a very low level of the gangster hierarchy". On the film's title, Varma said that he named it Satya for two reasons: one being a homage to Ardh Satya and the other one was a namesake girl whom he used to love in college who did not love him back.

=== Casting ===
A struggling Manoj Bajpayee auditioned for the role of Paresh Rawal's henchman in Daud, and Varma asked him if he had done any other film work; Bajpayee mentioned his supporting role in Bandit Queen. Varma, impressed by his performance in Bandit Queen, said that he wanted to give him a bigger role and advised him not to do Daud. However, Bajpayee wanted to appear in the film and Varma agreed. After filming was completed, Varma told Bajpayee that he regretted giving him a minor role and promised him a prominent role in his next film. Bajpayee suggested newcomer Anurag Kashyap's name to Varma for the screenplay. Varma liked Kashyap's Auto Narayan, and signed him to write the script. Although Kashyap was already writing the film, Varma felt that he needed a more experienced writer and asked Saurabh Shukla. Shukla was initially hesitant, since he wrote films he could direct. He went to Varma's office to decline, but Varma told him that he wanted to cast him in the film and outlined the plot. Shukla then agreed to do the film, since he was "stuck" with the narration. They went to Varma's farmhouse in Hyderabad and wrote the first draft in a week without doing research, since Kashyap felt that a gangster's psychology is "very similar to anybody else". Bajpayee had never met any gangster in his life and was not good at speaking Marathi, even though he was playing a Maharashtrian character. He then decided to first work on his external look and grew a beard, a heavy face and curly hair. He took suggestions from his maid on how to get the nuances of the Marathi accent and worked on the character for three to four months before filming began.

Varma wanted to cast new actors in the film. He cast J.D. Chakravarthy, who had worked with him on Shiva (1990), in the title role. Chakravarthy said that he tried to imitate Varma to prepare for the role. The title role was initially planned for Bajpayee, but after the characters clarified for Varma he felt that he needed someone more fluent in Hindi for Bhiku Mhatre; Chakravarthy, a native Telugu speaker, was not sufficiently fluent in Hindi. Bajpayee was unhappy with the decision since he wanted to play the title role, but agreed to remain on the film because no other role was available. He based Mhatre on a person from his hometown who was a Jeetendra fan, wore coloured T-shirts and was short-tempered; he took the accent from his cook who was from Kolhapur. He also gathered his own costume from 25,000 given to him by the production. When Shukla and Kashyap were discussing authentic-sounding character names, an office boy named Bhiku came in, and they decided to use his name for Bajpayee's character. Although the female lead was initially offered to Manisha Koirala, she was later replaced by Urmila Matondkar, with whom he had worked in Rangeela and Daud. Newcomer Sushant Singh was cast as Mhatre's henchman. Matondkar's costume was designed by Manish Malhotra.

=== Filming ===
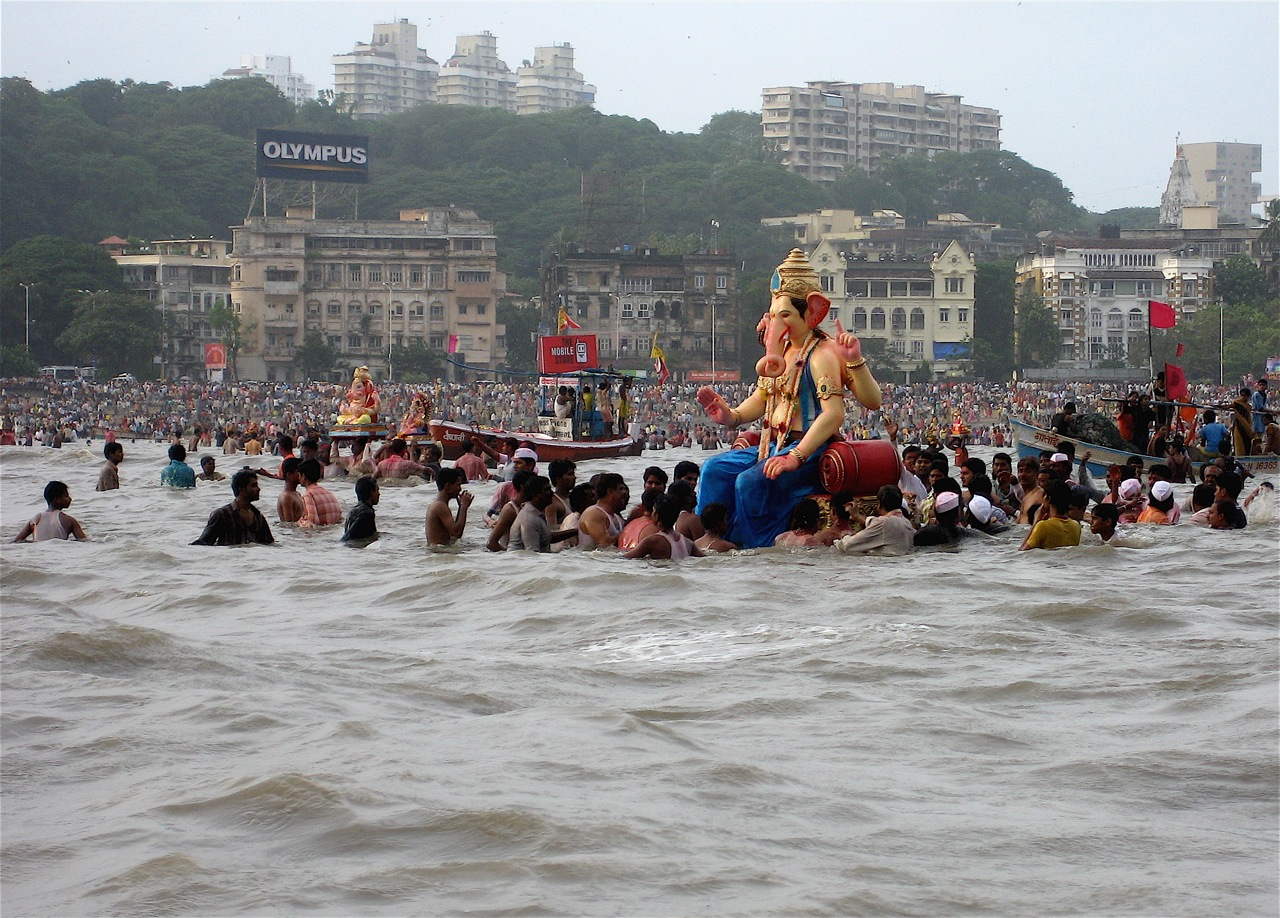
The film's climax was shot during Ganesh Chaturthi in Mumbai.

Satya was filmed in Mumbai during the monsoon season. The scene where Sushant Singh's face is slashed by Chakravarthy was supposed to end there, but Varma forgot to say "cut" and the rest of the scene was improvised by the actors. The film's opening montage, when Chakravarthy arrives in the city, was given to Kashyap to shoot. He planned the scene and filmed it with the cinematographer. The scene was very different from what Kashyap had imagined because of his inexperience in filming. Varma instructed him to re-shoot it and taught him how to communicate with the cameraman. Several scenes in the film were improvised, including the entire death scene of Bhiku Mhatre.

Bajpayee, who has acrophobia, was apprehensive while filming a scene for two hours where he is standing at the edge of a cliff. Satya's climactic scene was filmed during Ganesh Chaturthi, when the team recreated the Juhu beach with about 500 junior artists. The song "Kallu Mama" was filmed by Varma himself because the cinematographer was absent on the day of the shoot. The film's final scene to be shot, the song was largely improvised because the actors had been drinking. Satya was filmed in 50 days. The scene in the beginning of the film where Manjrekar and Bappu murder a film producer on a busy street was shot on a set; the street was created inside the studio, with parked cars belonging to the film crew. The first cinematographer was American Gerard Hooper, recommended to Varma by Kannan Iyer (who had written Daud). Hooper roamed Mumbai, filming the city even when no shooting was scheduled. However, he could not devote enough time to the project and left when it was thirty percent complete. Mazhar Kamran was the cinematographer for the rest of the film. According to Shukla, the film was shot on celluloid with "very low-light" and "low aperture."

== Soundtrack ==
The Mood of Satya
An example of Sandeep Chowta's background score

The film's soundtrack was composed by Vishal Bhardwaj, with lyrics by Gulzar. Sandeep Chowta composed the background score, which was released on the Venus Worldwide Entertainment label on 3 July 1998. The album has six tracks, including one instrumental. The film's 23-track background score was released as a separate album, Satya: The Sound, in November 1998. The singers were Lata Mangeshkar, Asha Bhosle, Suresh Wadkar, Mano, Hariharan and Bhupinder Singh.

== Release ==
A test screening of Satya's rough cut was shown to 60 people at the Dimple theatre in Bandra. The response was negative; the audience thought the film advocated amorality, and portions of its second half were re-shot. Satya was released in India on 3 July 1998 on a commission basis, so distributors would not lose money. The film targeted an urban audience, and dubbed Telugu and Tamil-language versions were released in their regional markets. It was dubbed in English for screenings at international film festivals, with Vivek Oberoi dubbing one of the characters. Satya was part of the Indian Panorama section at the 1998 International Film Festival of India.

The Central Board of Film Certification retained its strong language and violence, since its members found them an integral part of the film. Satya received an A (adults-only) certificate, with no objections from the board. Several cast and crew members attended the film's premiere at the Eros Cinema, where it received a good audience response. Star Plus acquired the film's satellite-telecast rights, and it was telecast on 26 December 1998 while it was still running in theatres. Its DVD was released on 22 September 2006.

=== Critical reception ===
Satya opened to praise from film critics. Shobhaa De wrote in her review, "Satya spoke the language of the streets-rough, crude, brutal. And yet, did not offend sensibilities. It perfectly captured the savagery of what has become our daily reality while also uncovering the final futility and pathos of mind-less gang wars." In his review, Khalid Mohammed wrote: "Satya is a gritty, hellishly exciting film which stings and screams. No one will go away from it unprovoked or unmoved." According to Anupama Chopra, "The maverick director ... has broken all Bollywood rules this time... Satya is an exercise in integrated aesthetics. It has a decidedly realistic feel and taut pacing." Suparn Verma of Rediff.com wrote, "Satya is a culmination of Ram Gopal Varma's work to date. His characters have the intensity and anger of Shiva, and the Urmila-Chakravathy relationship is better tuned version of what he did in Drohi". Another reviewer called to the film a "no punches pulled movie mirroring, authentically, the visage of a sick society."

Its retrospective reviews have also been positive. Jai Arjun Singh wrote, "Ram Gopal Varma shattered movie tastes with it, inventing a new language", and he called it his "favourite Indian gangster film". Raja Sen, giving the film a five-out-of-five rating, called Satya "... a visceral ride up the ranks of Mumbai's underworld, a film that influenced every gangster film after it, and one where all the elements-performances, characters, music, cinematography, action-came together very memorably indeed." At the 20 years of the film's release, Sukanya Verma wrote: "Shot in a blue-brown palette, the clever compositions – a mix of cool camera angles, hand-held view, long shots and noir lighting – capture the stifling complexity and conflicting emotions of its characters."

=== Box office ===
The film, made on a budget of ₹2.5 crore (US$260,000)., earned an estimated ₹15 crore (US$1.6 million). It did "record-breaking" business in Mumbai, with first-week occupancy rate of 85 percent and earnings of ₹1.5 crore (US$160,000). Satya earned ₹24 lakh (US$25,000) on fifteen screens in one week in Delhi and Uttar Pradesh, and the film benefited from the government of Maharashtra's entertainment tax exemption. It earned ₹1.27 crore (US$130,000) in its second week, with a 97 percent occupancy rate in its third week. Satya ran for eleven weeks, when it earned ₹3.27 crore (US$340,000). The film did 65 percent of its business on the Mumbai circuit, netting over ₹9 crore (US$930,000) in the city. Declared a box-office hit, it was one of 1998's highest-grossing Indian films.

== Accolades ==
46th National Film Awards:

- Best Supporting Actor – Manoj Bajpayee

44th Filmfare Awards:

Won

- Best Film (Critics) – Ram Gopal Varma
- Best Actor (Critics) – Manoj Bajpayee
- Best Actress (Critics) – Shefali Shah
- Best Background Score – Sandeep Chowta
- Best Editing – Apurva Asrani and Bhanodaya
- Best Sound Design – H. Sridhar

Nominated

- Best Film – Ram Gopal Varma
- Best Director – Ram Gopal Varma
- Best Actress – Urmila Matondkar
- Best Supporting Actor – Manoj Bajpayee
- Best Supporting Actress – Shefali Shah
- Best Villain – Govind Namdev

== Analysis ==
Although Satya is known for its realistic depiction of the Mumbai underworld, Varma has often said that his films do not glorify crime. In his book, Studying Indian Cinema, Omar Ahmed wrote that unlike American crime films (where success is measured by the accumulation of wealth), Satya is about individual survival; Ahmed called it a "post-modern gangster film." The title character's background remains a mystery throughout the film, and his and other characters' location in the city is unspecified. In her book Bombay Cinema: An Archive of the City, Ranjani Mazumdar wrote that Satya's Mumbai resembles a "documentary montage of claustrophobic spaces" with "documentary-styled visuals".

The film's characters speak in a local, tapori dialect of Hindi. In his book, Lunch with a Bigot, Amitava Kumar wrote that Satya's language of abuse "erupts more than the guns exploding". The authors of Locating Cultural Change: Theory, Method, Process compared the characters of Amod Shukla and Khandilkar to former Mumbai police commissioner Rakesh Maria. Varma used Sudhir Mishra's 1996 film, Is Raat Ki Subah Nahin, as a reference point for Satya.

== Legacy ==
Satya is considered a modern masterpiece by several critics, and one of the best films of the 1990s. It has achieved cult status, and is cited as one of the best Indian gangster films for its realistic portrayal of violence; "paving the way" for future gangster films. Reviewing Varma's 2008 film, Contract, critic Rajeev Masand called Satya one of the most influential films of the past ten years. The film introduced a new genre, a variation of film noir which has been called "Mumbai noir". Satya was a breakthrough film for Manoj Bajpayee. Kay Kay Menon credited his role as a turning point for other method actors: "If it were not for Manoj's brilliant performance in Satya, actors like Irrfan and me might still be waiting to be accepted. Manoj opened the doors for us." His performance as Bhiku Mhatre (with his line, "Mumbai ka king kaun? Bhiku Mhatre"; "Who is king of Mumbai? Bhiku Mhatre") is considered one of the most memorable in Hindi cinema. Filmmaker Karan Johar placed Satya in his list of the 11 films that changed Bollywood forever, calling it "quite simply the mother of all underworld films."

Ram Gopal Varma said that every character in the film was based on "someone he met or heard of". Music director and composer Vishal Bhardwaj named his studio Satya Studio, after the film. Satya also gave 24-year-old screenwriter Anurag Kashyap his Bollywood break: "I learnt everything to do with films while working with [Varma] on [Satya] and I still reflect in my movies what I learnt during the making of [the film]." Meghna Gulzar said that in the song "Kallu Mama", she could smell the beer on the character's breath. The film also propelled the career of editor Apurva Asrani, since it was his first. Reviewing Satya 2, critic Paloma Sharma wrote: "Satya 2 is as bad as Satya was good". Satya is also credited for a trend toward Hindi films with no stars, high concepts and low budgets. After seeing the film, Shah Rukh Khan told Chakravathy that if "you want to ruin this film, you should replace yourself with me in it". Amitabh Bachchan called Kashyap with praise. British director Danny Boyle cited Satya as an inspiration for his 2008 Academy Award-winning Slumdog Millionaire. Satya's "slick, often mesmerizing" portrayal of the Mumbai underworld, which included gritty, realistic "brutality and urban violence," influenced Boyle's depiction of the Mumbai underworld.

Satya was on IBN Live's 2013 list of the 100 greatest Indian films of all time, in the 100 Filmfare Days series and on the "70 iconic movies of independent India" list. It was mentioned in Rachel Dwyer's 100 Bollywood Films (where she called it a "masterpiece"), and in critic and author Shubhra Gupta's 50 Films That Changed Bollywood, 1995-2015.

In 2021, critic Uday Bhatia wrote a book titled Bullets Over Bombay: Satya and the Hindi Film Gangster about the making of the film.

== Sequels ==
Satya was the first film of Varma's Gangster series. It was followed by two other films – Company (2002) and D (2005) – and a sequel, Satya 2 (2013). Company, starring Mohanlal, Manisha Koirala, Vivek Oberoi and Ajay Devgn, was loosely based on Dawood Ibrahim's D-Company and received positive reviews. It was followed by D, starring Randeep Hooda and also produced by Varma, which was less successful than its predecessors. Satya 2 was a critical and commercial failure. According to Saibal Chatterjee, "Satya, the ultimate guns-and-gangs saga, was clearly in no need of re-interpretation."

== Bibliography ==
- Mazumdar, Ranjani (2008). Bombay Cinema: An Archive of the City. U of Minnesota Press. ISBN 9781452913025.
- Ahmed, Omar (2015). Studying Indian Cinema. Columbia University Press. ISBN 9780993238499.
- Gupta, Shubhra (2016). 50 Films That Changed Bollywood, 1995-2015. Harper Collins. ISBN 9789351778486.
- Dwyer, Rachel (2005). 100 Bollywood Films. Roli Books Private Limited. p. 157. ISBN 9788174369901.
- Kumar, Amitava (2015). Lunch with a Bigot. Pan Macmillan. ISBN 9781509814152.
- Miguel, Helio San (2012). Mumbai. Intellect Books. p. 68. ISBN 9781841506326.
- Rai, Amit S. (2009). Untimely Bollywood: Globalization and India's New Media Assemblage. Duke University Press. ISBN 9780822392330.
- Chanda, Ipshita; Basu, Partha Pratim (2011). Locating Cultural Change: Theory, Method, Process. SAGE Publishing India. p. 89. ISBN 9788132118886.
