= Gangster (franchise) =

Indian crime thriller franchise

- Directed by: Ram Gopal Varma; Vishram Sawant
- Screenplay by: Ram Gopal Varma; Anurag Kashyap; Saurabh Shukla; Manish Gupta; Jaideep Sahni
- Story by: Ram Gopal Varma
- Produced by: Ram Gopal Varma; C. Ashwini Dutt; Ronnie Screwvala
- Production companies: Varma Corporation Ltd; Vyjayanthi Movies; UTV Motion Pictures
- Country: India
- Languages: Hindi; Telugu

Gangster is an Indian Hindi and Telugu-language crime thriller franchise written, directed and produced by Ram Gopal Varma. It is based on the Indian mafia organization D-Company, known to be run by Dawood Ibrahim. The first film came in 1998: the critically acclaimed Satya, later followed by Company and then the prequel D, with storylines based on the Mumbai underworld. Satya has won six Filmfare Awards, including the Critics Award for Best Film. These three films make up the original Gangster trilogy.

Consequent unrelated installments were also produced which were not as well received as the original trilogy, Satya 2, serving as an unrelated sequel to Satya, D Company (web series) and D Company, a prelude to the web series.

In 2002 came his commercial as well as critical success, Company, an example of parallel cinema, was based on the real-life underworld organization, the D-Company. It won seven Filmfare Awards and earned him a Filmfare Best Director Award nomination. Malayalam actor Mohanlal debuted in Bollywood doing an extended cameo in this film. A prequel to Company was made in 2005: D, produced by Varma and directed by Vishram Sawant. Satya, Company and D are together considered an "Indian gangster trilogy".

Satya and Company, in particular, were cited by British director Danny Boyle as influences on his Academy Award-winning film Slumdog Millionaire (2008), for their "slick, often mesmerizing portrayals of the Mumbai underworld", their display of "brutality and urban violence", and their gritty realism.

== Features ==
=== Original Trilogy ===
- Satya (1998)
- Company (2002)
- D (2005)

=== Unrelated Sequel to Satya ===
- Satya 2 (2013)

=== Unrelated Docudramas ===
- D Company (2021 web series)
- D Company (2021 prelude film)

== Films ==
=== Satya (1998) ===
Mumbai is in the midst of a turf war between many gangs, collectively referred to as the Mumbai underworld when Satya (J.D Chakravarthy), a man without a past, comes to the city looking for employment. While waiting tables at the local dance bar, he gets involved in a scuffle with Jagga (Jeeva), bag man for dreaded don Guru Narayan (Raju Mavani). Jagga takes his revenge by getting Satya arrested on false charges of pimping. In jail, Satya clashes with yet another member of Mumbai's mafia, underworld don Bhiku Mhatre (Manoj Bajpai), who is in prison pending trial for the murder of a prominent film producer. Mhatre, pleased with Satya's bravado, extends a hand of friendship and arranges for his release as well as accommodation. With Mhatre's help, Satya avenges himself by gunning down Jagga in the very same dance bar and joins Mhatre's gang.

Before branching out on his own, Mhatre was part of a gang that included himself, Guru Narayan, Kallu Mama (Saurabh Shukla) and lawyer Chandrakant Mule (Makrand Deshpande). Bhau Thakurdas Jhawle (Govind Namdeo), presently a corporator in the Mumbai Municipal Corporation, was the gang leader. After Jhawle joined politics, the gang split into two with Kallu and Mule joining Mhatre and Narayan going his own way. While the gangs had carved out their own territories which were off-limits to the rival gang, both still maintained a relationship with Jhawle. Jagga's assassination breaks the uneasy truce and Narayan reneges on his promise by attacking Mhatre's gang when they are out on business. Mhatre decides to kill Narayan but is forced to abandon his project at the last moment on orders from Jhawle; the murder on the eve of the municipal elections would have triggered a gang war and would be detrimental to Jhawle's political prospects. Meanwhile, Satya, who has risen up the ranks and become a key decision-maker in the gang, has met and fallen in love with Vidya (Urmila Matondkar), an aspiring playback singer who lives next door, but has not informed her of his underworld connections. At one point he even threatens a music director and gets him to sign her up for a project, with Vidya being unaware of the entire episode.

Satya tells Mhatre, fuming over Jhawle's orders to stay away from Narayan, to ignore him and they assassinate Narayan. Mhatre is now the unchallenged ruler of the underworld and Jhawle, knowing that he needs Mhatre's help to win the elections, patches up with him. This is when the city sees the appointment of a new police commissioner, Amodh Shukla (Paresh Rawal). Shukla and his force begin targeting Mhatre's gang through encounters. Satya, seeing the situation getting out of hand, convinces the gang that the commissioner has to be eliminated and gets him killed. The police respond by intensifying the crackdown. Jhawle wins the elections thanks to Mhatre's muscle power as well as public anger on the brutal methods adopted by the police in its fight against organized crime. In the midst of this, Satya and Vidya decide to catch a movie. Inspector Khandilkar (Aditya Shrivastava), on the basis of a tipoff that Satya is present in the cinema hall, surrounds the premises and orders that all doors be shut. Satya fires a gun, triggering a stampede which results in many fatalities, and escapes with Vidya. But the man who did not fear death now fears for Vidya's life. He decides to quit the underworld and reveals his decision to Mhatre, who decides to send them to Dubai where they would be safe.

Jhawle holds a party to celebrate his victory and invites Mhatre, Mule and Kallu to attend the same. During the party, he shoots Mhatre dead for having disobeyed his order and sends Kallu along with Mule to kill Satya. Satya, unaware of Mhatre's death, runs off to Vidya and lies to her one last time, but has to flee when the police arrive. Khandilkar spills the beans in front of Vidya. Kallu returns to his headquarters, kills Mule instead of Satya, and informs Satya about Mhatre's fate. Satya takes his revenge by murdering Jhawle during Anant Chaturdashi celebrations but suffers a bullet wound in the process. Satya returns to Vidya's house to meet her but she refuses to open the door. He manages to break it open but Khandilkar, who has arrived to arrest him, shoots him multiple times. Satya collapses a few inches away from Vidya's feet, and breathes his last.

=== Company (2002) ===
The film highlights the economics behind running an Indian mafia organization. In the opening, Ajay Devgan describes the modus operandi of underworld. He states "Despite anybody telling anything else, in this world everything is done for profit, so is this business. We don't pay taxes, neither do we keep accounts; For this work is done by inducing fear. Anybody can join us anytime, but can never resign. Whoever breaks our law, is broken by us. Here friendship, respect or honesty, the only real reason behind all these is same thing -- Profit". During murder / extortion scenes following, Ajay Devgan adds "profit happens -- like this, like this or like that".

The story revolves around a young man named Chandu (full name: Chandarkant Nagre) (played by Vivek Oberoi) joining the world of crime in the Mumbai underworld to "make it big" someday. Gradually he learns tricks of the trade and increases the gang's earnings and profits. This leads to his affinity with Malik (played by Ajay Devgan) who is the leader of the gang.

The film features one cold-blooded murder scene wherein Malik and Chandu kill Saeed and his brother Anis in the rear seat of the car on a chilling rainy day. Thereafter Malik goes on a bloody rampage killing all his opponents, so as to take the reins of underworld in his hands.

They include his rival gang leader and colleague under Aslam's umbrella Sharma, who was in a meeting with police inspector Rathod, also killed off. Inspector Rathod, who once tortured and abused Chandu in jail in early days, was also killed at Malik's permission.

However, both come at loggerheads during the execution of a contract killing. Here a slight influence of Scarface can be felt when the hero refuses to go ahead because the victim's children would also be killed - (Al Pacino shoots down his Bolivian partner's cold-blooded killing expert to stop the bomb explosion arranged by him and thus digs his own grave : Chandu stops the deliberate vehicle crash and falls from Malik's favor.) The contract was from a politician who tries to use Malik's gang to eliminate a front-runner, a contender for Home Minister's post. The assassination (a staged truck-car collision) takes place in-spite of Chandu's emotional misdemeanor since Malik, not relaying on Chandu anymore, takes reins in his own hands and gives direct orders.

The rift between Chandu and Malik widens due to various misunderstandings. The Commissioner of Police, Sreenivasan IPS (Mohanlal) makes use of the rift to bring the mafia under control. Chandu and Malik end up becoming bitter enemies. After Chandu's retaliation of the assassination of his lifelong friend of one of lieutenants Warsi, two factions of Mumbai's once most powerful gang 'Company' went to a full-scale war.

Malik and Chandu killed as many members of each opponent gangs as possible. Sreenivasan, as the police chief of the city of murders due to the war, became criticized greatly, but he and his men knew this war ultimately is shortening the to-do list of his department. Big numbers of button men and lieutenants from both gangs were being killed. The war results in an intense chase sequence shot in Kenya where Malik hires hitmen to kill Chandu.

Chandu survives, though he is injured severely. Sreenivasan convinces Chandu to come back to Mumbai and fight his war with Malik by helping the police bring the mafia under control.

The story reaches its climax when Chandu kills the politician (the mastermind of the contract killing) within the prison. At the same time, one of Chandu's aides named Koda Singh, who swore revenge to kill who went against his friend Chandu, shoots Malik point-blank to death in Hong Kong.

This shows, Chandu and Malik came to a truce but Chandu never withdrew his order to Koda to kill Malik. It's not confirmed that whether Chandu has forgotten to withdraw his orders or deliberately kept that on. But, after the assassination, Sreenivasan notified Chandu and Chandu became tremendously shocked at this news. So, possibly Chandu forgot to send a come back call to Koda.

Koda Singh was arrested by Hong Kong Police on that day. The end shows Chandu spending the rest of his life in prison after being persuaded by the Police Commissioner to surrender.

=== D (2005) ===
Deshu (Randeep Hooda) is a mechanic in Dubai, who has come home after his mother's death. His father is a dry, gruff police constable. Deshu unwittingly becomes a witness to a murder, when Mangli Bhai's goons chase a man, burst into his chawl, and proceed to kill the man right there. Roughened up by the police to act as a witness, and threatened by the goons to not do so, Deshu keeps his mouth shut. Later, he joins a rival gang (Hashim Bhai's), and proceeds to kill Mangli. Little by little, with his bravery and intelligence he manages to become Bhai's right-hand man, much to the dismay of his two sons, Muqarram and Shabbir.

Slowly, he becomes the most important member of the gang. Once, a secretary from a film-actress gives him the contract of pulling out her of a trouble of being harassed by a male colleague. The actress, impressed by Deshu's attitude, later becomes his girlfriend.

The rest of the film chronicles his take-over of the gang when Bhai, bending to his son's wishes, allows an unwarranted attack on Deshu and his faithful lieutenant Raghav. Raghav is killed with his girlfriend, but Deshu survives the attack. He takes on the gang and kills Bhai's sons, but does not kill Hashim. He does this not out of any generosity, but purposely to take the sweet revenge as he knows that Bhai is not in a position to harm him. The film ends with Deshu, having crowned himself underworld king, dreaming of forming the "D" company and running it as a well-tuned machine from outside India's borders.

=== Satya 2 (2013) ===
Satya 2 revolves around a young man name Satya, a man without a past, who comes to the city envisions the rebirth of his company. By the year 2013, Mumbai underworld was erased by Mumbai police.

=== D Company (2021) ===
The biggest saga of the year is about to unfold the dark side of India's underworld enterprise. The film will showcase the true story behind India's biggest underworld enterprise, D Company, a Mumbai-based underworld gang headed by Dawood Ibrahim Kaskar.

== Awards ==
=== Satya ===
Satya won six Filmfare Awards including all three Critics awards (Best Movie, Best Actor and Best Actress awards, male and female, for Bajpai and Shah), Best Editing (Apurva Asrani and Bhanodaya), Best Sound Recording (H. Sridhar) and Best Background Score (Sandeep Chowta). It won four Star Screen Awards including Best Supporting Actor (Bajpai), Best Supporting Actress (Shah), Best Screenplay (Kashyap and Shukla) and Screen Award Special Jury Award (J. D. Chakravarthy). Ram Gopal Varma won the Bollywood Movie Award – Best Director for this film. Bajpai also won the Zee Cine Award and the National Film Award for best actor in a supporting role.

In 2005, Indiatimes Movies included Satya in its list of 25 Must See Bollywood Movies.

=== Company ===
Filmfare Awards

- Won, Critics' Award for Best Actor - Ajay Devgn
- Won, Critics' Award for Best Actress - Manisha Koirala
- Won, Best Actor in a Supporting Role - Vivek Oberoi
- Won, Best Debut - Vivek Oberoi
- Won, Best Dialogue - Jaideep Sahni
- Won, Best Editing - Chandan Arora
- Won, Best Story - Jaideep Sahni
- Nominated, Best Actor - Ajay Devgan
- Nominated, Best Actress - Manisha Koirala
- Nominated', Best Actor in a Supporting Role - Vivek Oberoi
- Nominated, Best Actress in a Supporting Role - Antara Mali
- Nominated, Best Director - Ram Gopal Varma
- Nominated, Best Film

IIFA Awards

- Won, IIFA Best Supporting Actor Award - Vivek Oberoi
- Won, Award for Technical Excellence - Best Action - Allan Amin
- Won, Best Editing - Chandan Arora

Bollywood Movie Awards

- Won, Bollywood Movie Award – Best Director - Ram Gopal Varma

Star Screen Awards

- Won, 2002:Best Actor Award - Mohanlal
- Won, 2002:Best supporting Actor Award - Ajay Devgan
- Won, 2002:Star Screen Award Most Promising Newcomer - Male for Vivek Oberoi

== Cast ==
=== Satya ===
- J. D. Chakravarthy as Satya
- Urmila Matondkar as Vidya
- Paresh Rawal as Commissioner Amod Shukla
- Manoj Bajpayee as Bhiku Mhatre

=== Company ===
- Mohanlal as Srinivasan IPS
- Ajay Devgan as N. Malik
- Manisha Koirala as Saroja
- Vivek Oberoi as Chandrakant (Chandu)
- Seema Biswas as Ranibai
- Antara Mali as Kannu

=== D ===
- Randeep Hooda as Deshu
- Chunky Pandey as Raghav
- Rukhsar Rehman as Bhakti Bhatnagar
- Isha Koppikar as Gunjan

=== Satya 2 ===
- Puneet Singh Ratn as Satya (Hindi version)
- Sharwanand as Satya (Telugu version)
- Anaika Soti as Chitra
- Mahesh Thakur as Builder Lahoti
- Amitriyaan as Naara (Satya's only friend)
- Aradhna Gupta as Special
- Raj Premi as RK
- Sana Khan as Special
- Amal Sehrawat as TK
- Ashok Samarth as Solomon
- Kaushal Kapoor as Retd. Dy. Commissioner Purshottam
- Vikram Singh as Anna

=== D Company ===
- Ashwat Kanth as Dawood Ibrahim
- Pranay Dixit as Chota Shakeel
- Abhilash Chaudhary as Alamzeb
- Rudra Kanth as Sabir
- Naina Ganguly as Sujatha
- Gaurav Daagar as Vishal Cheeta
- Rocky Mahajan as Samad Khan
- Irra Mor as Chitra
- Mursaleem Qureshi as Jhoni Akhawat
- Anshu Rajput as Haseena
- Heramb Tripathi as Aamir Zada
- Vikas Rao as Javed
