= Judaa Hoke Bhi =

2022 film by Vikram Bhatt

- Teaser poster
- Directed by: Vikram Bhatt
- Written by: Principal Script: Mahesh Bhatt; Contributions: Suhurita Sengupta; Shweta Bothra; Zuhaebb
- Produced by: Pooja Bhatt; Raj Kishor Khaware; Krishna Bhatt; Amar Thakkar
- Starring: Akshay Oberoi; Aindrita Ray
- Cinematography: Prakash Kutty
- Edited by: Kuldip Mehan
- Music by: Songs: Puneet Dixit; Harish Sagane; Amjad Nadeem Aamir; Chote Baba; Score: Gregory Dombrowski
- Production companies: Loneranger Productions; Houseful Motion Pictures
- Distributed by: K Sera Sera
- Release date: 15 July 2022
- Country: India
- Language: Hindi
- Box office: est. ₹0.25 crore

Judaa Hoke Bhi (transl. Even after parting ways) is a 2022 Indian Hindi-language supernatural horror film directed by Vikram Bhatt and written by Mahesh Bhatt. It was jointly produced by Loneranger Productions and Houseful Motion Pictures, and presented by Mahesh Bhatt and K Sera Sera Vikram Bhatt Productions. The film stars Akshay Oberoi and Aindrita Ray, alongside Meherzan Mazda.

The film was completely shot inside K Sera Sera and Vikram Bhatt's newly set up Studio Virtual Worlds, using virtual production (VP) technology, with the support of Unreal Engine. Judaa Hoke Bhi was released on 15 July 2022.

== Plot ==
Aman and Meera are a married couple. Aman does not like it when Meera talks to him about practical things like bills, EMIs, and earning money to run the home. He would rather drink and sing at random bars than in a studio that actually wants to pay him. The supposed reason behind Aman's drinking is that the couple lost their only son some years ago.

Meera is a successful writer who has been offered a suspiciously lucrative ‘ghost’ writing assignment at a secluded spot in Uttrakhand. Just when Meera is about to leave, Aman has an accident and slips into a coma. Meera decides to skip the assignment and stay by Aman's side to care for him. To change her mind, the villainous client sends a creature to the hospital where Aman is admitted. The creature then impersonates a nurse, and gets the ward boy to substitute Aman's medicine with alcohol. Meera smells the alcohol, gets angry with Aman and reverts to her decision of going to Uttrakhand.

Once she reaches there, Meera is immediately warned by a random Yamdoot-like middle aged blind man to run for her life. The Yamdoot-man then tries to convince Aman to save Meera. Aman relents and leaves for Uttrakhand. In Uttrakhand, Meera's new boss is into pet monsters and herbs that are aphrodisiacs. Aman arrives to rescue Meera, but he must fight several battles. Aman wins over the monsters and successfully rescues Meera.

== Cast ==
- Akshay Oberoi as Aman Khanna
- Aindrita Ray as Meera
- Meherzan Mazda as Siddharth Jaiwardhan
- Jiya Mustafa
- Rushad Rana
- Puneet Tejwani

== Production ==
In March 2022, K Sera Sera and Vikram Bhatt announced the setting up of their new virtual production (VP) studio named Studio Virtual Worlds. In May end, they announced that Judaa Hoke Bhi directed by Vikram Bhatt will be their first production. The film was completely shot in the studio using virtual production technology, with the help of Epic Games' game engine Unreal Engine.

== Soundtrack ==
Judaa Hoke Bhi

Soundtrack album by Puneet Dixit, Amjad Nadeem Aamir, Chote Baba, Harish Sagane
- Released: 24 June 2022
- Recorded: 2021–2022
- Genre: Feature film soundtrack
- Length: 34:14
- Language: Hindi
- Label: Zee Music Company

Official audio
- Judaa Hoke Bhi - Full Album on YouTube

The film's music was composed by Puneet Dixit, Amjad Nadeem Aamir, Chote Baba, and Harish Sagane. Lyrics of the songs were penned by Shweta Bothra and Puneet Dixit. The songs were released by Zee Music Company. The album was released on 1 July 2022.

=== Track list ===
No.	Title	Lyrics	Music	Singer(s)	Length
1.	"Mera Naseeb Ho"	Shakeel Azmi	Amjad Nadeem Aamir, Chote Baba	Stebin Ben	4:39
2.	"O Meri Jaan"	Puneet Dixit, Purvi Pathak	Puneet Dixit	Puneet Dixit	6:51
3.	"Aye Mere Dil Bata"	Shweta Bothra	Harish Sagane	Ankit Tiwari	5:12
4.	"Andekhi"	Shweta Bothra	Puneet Dixit	Sunidhi Chauhan	5:21
5.	"Rootha Hoon"	Shweta Bothra	Puneet Dixit	Mohit Chauhan	5:21
6.	"Judaa Hoke Bhi"	Shweta Bothra	Puneet Dixit	Stebin Ben	6:50
Total length:					34:14

== Reception ==
Archika Khurana of The Times of India rated the film 2.5 out of 5 stars and praised the songs writing, "The songs are soulful and heighten the impact of the drama". Concluding her review Khurana wrote, "All said, this overstretched drama is way too cliched and soppy to hold your attention, but it does amuse you in its own unique ways. The performances and the soulful music definitely make this 122-minute drama worth a one-time watch."
