= Mohandas (2008 film) =

- Movie poster for Mohandas
- Directed by: Mazhar Kamran
- Written by: Uday Prakash
- Produced by: Abha Sonakia
- Starring: Nakul Vaid; Sonali Kulkarni; Aditya Srivastava; Sushant Singh; Uttam Halder
- Cinematography: Mazhar Kamran
- Edited by: Suresh Pai
- Music by: Vivek Priyadarshan
- Distributed by: Saregama
- Release dates: 26 October 2008 (SAIFF); 4 September 2009 (India)
- Running time: 112 minutes
- Country: India
- Language: Hindi

Mohandas is a 2008 drama film directed by Mazhar Kamran based on a story by noted Hindi writer Uday Prakash. The film stars Sonali Kulkarni, Nakul Vaid, Sushant Singh, Uttam Halder, Sharbani Mukherjee and Aditya Srivastava.

Mohandas was released on 4 September 2009. The film received positive reviews and was nominated for the Grand Prix at the Fribourg International Film Festival.

== Synopsis ==
Meghna, a Delhi-based journalist, receives a disturbing videotape from a man in Anuppur claiming his identity has been stolen. Intrigued, she travels to the remote town to investigate. She discovers the story of Mohandas, a brilliant student from a marginalized basket-weaving community who had successfully secured a position at Oriental Coal Mines. However, despite being selected, he was never called to start work. Mohandas eventually uncovers a surreal truth, an impostor aided by local corruption has assumed his name and is already working in his place. When the real Mohandas attempts to reclaim his life, he is met with brutal violence and cast out, which eventually gets filmed by a small time journalist Anil Yadav. Moved by his plight, Meghna broadcasts his story, catching the attention of Harshvardhan, a local lawyer who decides to fight for Mohandas’s legal rights.

The legal battle is rigged from the start. The local powerhouse, Nagendranath (the father of the impostor, Bishnath), manipulates the law to protect his son. The case takes several dark turns. Harshvardhan is accused of bribery by his one of the witness to ruin his reputation. Even when evidence surfaces such as Bishnath's wife is interrogated and Bishnath’s father-in-law agreeing to testify a corrupt legal system, which leads to Bishnath getting arrested, an obstinate Nagendranath ensures Bishnath gets exonerated at any cost. The presiding judge, Muktibodh, is transferred for trying to remain fair, and Harshvardhan is ultimately killed in a staged truck accident after attempting to expose the conspiracy and an unsuccessful attempt to get Bishnath behind bars.

Devastated by the death of his lawyer and the total collapse of the justice system, Mohandas retreats to a broken-down house in a distant village. When Meghna finds him again, he is a shell of his former self. Having lost all faith in the law, he has surrendered to his fate, heartbreakingly accepting that he is no longer "Mohandas."

== Cast ==
- Nakul Vaid as Mohandas
- Sonali Kulkarni as Meghna Sengupta
- Sharbani Mukherji as Mrs. Kasturi Mohandas
- Sushant Singh as Fake Mohandas / Bishnath
- Govind Namdeo as Justice Muktibodh
- Uttam Halder as Anil Yadav
- Aditya Srivastava as Advocate Harshvardhan Soni
- Akhilendra Mishra Nagendranath (Bishnath's father)

== Reception ==
The film was critically acclaimed. Film critic Namrata Joshi wrote in Outlook "Hindi litterateur Uday Prakash’s Mohandas is a compelling tale about a young man in small-town MP struggling to reclaim his job and identity, stolen by a crook. Mazhar Kamran turns it into a simple, sincere and persuasive film." Avijit Ghosh wrote in his review in the Times of India "Mohandas is the sort of film that Govind Nihalani and his ilk don't make any more. Not that the film is an angry or persuasive visual document like Aakrosh or Ardh Satya, but director-cinematographer Mazhar Kamran's maiden offering shows a willingness to engage and dares to raise uncomfortable questions that feel-good Bollywood prefers to ignore these days." Utpal Borpujari writing in the Deccan Herald remarked that "It is an important film of recent films" Shoma Chatterji wrote in an essay on the film : "Kamran has gathered an ensemble cast of actors chosen mostly from television. Each one of them has performed brilliantly, their characters one with themselves."

== Accolades ==
- Special Jury Prize at Innsbruck International Film Festival Austria.
- Nominated – 2009 Grand Prix ( Le Regard d'Or ) at Fribourg International Film Festival ( Artistic Director Édouard Waintrop )
- Nominated – 2008 South Asian International Film Festival New York
- Nominated – 2008 Osian's-Cinefan Film Festival New Delhi
- 2009 Selected in the "New Directors Emerging in the International Scene" section of the 52nd San Francisco International Film Festival
