= Kasshish =

- Logo
- Genre: Television drama
- Written by: Reshma Khan
- Directed by: Ravi Rai
- Starring: see below
- Opening theme: "Kasshish" by Jagjit Singh
- Country of origin: India
- Original language: Hindi
- No. of seasons: 1
- No. of episodes: Total 78

Production
- Camera setup: Multi-camera
- Running time: Approx. 23 minutes
- Production company: K Sera Sera Limited

Original release
- Network: Zee TV
- Release: 20 June – 1 November 2005

Kasshish is an Indian Hindi language drama series which premiered on 20 June 2005 on Zee TV. The series is produced by Ravi Rai of K Sera Sera Limited and stars Simone Singh and Ayub Khan in the main lead.

== Overview ==
The story focuses on the lives of four protagonists: Pia, Anand, Ratna and Aman and how life takes them on a path they never thought they would walk on one day. At the beginning of the story, everything goes well when Pia and Anand get married. They live their normal lives, such as Pia works in a travel agency while Anand works in a construction company. Besides that Pia is greatly appreciated by her in-laws, and life seems like a bed of roses. But, like every other story, this story also has a negative side, when Pia discovers that her husband is having an affair with the other woman. Her entire world comes crashing down instantaneously. What shatters her further is when she discovers that the other woman is none other than her own cousin sister Ratna.

Besides having such a loyal wife as Pia, Anand still gets attracted toward Ratna because of her style of living. But unlike any ordinary traditional Indian girl, Pia decides to abide by her responsibilities as a wife and a daughter in law of a prestigious family. She initially overlooks Anand's mistakes, but things reach at such a point that she gives him a final warning to come out of the relationship within a month's time. But Anand admits that he is unable to come out of the relationship. This gives Pia even greater shock and leads to Pia receiving the worst blow - miscarriage. Finally, she is so much fed up with Anand that she decides to walk out of his life.

As the story moves on, there enters the other man name Aman in Pia's life. He is an airforce pilot with an equally painful past - his wife died leaving him with a young child to look after. What draws Pia to Aman is her belief of the term 'a perfect man' is repaired after Anand broke it. Aman is a doting father and an affectionate man. What more could a woman ask for? The question remains that: Will Aman be the same man after marrying Pia? Will Pia ever be happy with her life again? These unanswered questions form the roots of 'Kasshish'.

== Cast ==
- Mukul Dev as Aman
- Ayub Khan as Anand
- Simone Singh as Piya
- Kitu Gidwani as Ratna
- Faizan Kidwai as Karan Seth
- Pubali Sanyal
- Sheetal Shah
- Supriya Karnik
- Imran Hasnee
- Rita Bhaduri
