= Mitti (2001 film) =

2001 film by Iqbal Durrani

- Poster
- Directed by: Iqbal Durrani
- Written by: Iqbal Durrani
- Produced by: Salim Akhtar
- Starring: Ferdous Ahmed; Sharbani Mukherjee; Kulbhushan Kharbanda; Arif Zakaria; Vishal
- Cinematography: Nimesh Bhat
- Edited by: Waman Bhonsle
- Music by: Sajid–Wajid, Ali-Gani, Monty
- Production company: Aftab Pictures
- Release date: 26 October 2001
- Country: India
- Language: Hindi

Mitti is a 2001 Hindi crime-thriller film written and directed by Iqbal Durrani, produced by Salim Ahamed, and starring Ferdous Ahmed, Sharbani Mukherjee, Kulbhushan Kharbanda, Arif Zakaria, and Mukesh Tiwari

== Cast ==
- Ferdous Ahmed as Deva (the main protagonist
- Sharbani Mukherjee as Pooja (Deva's love interest)
- Kulbhushan Kharbanda as Dadaji (Deva's grandfather)
- Arif Zakaria as Pahelwaan
- Kiku Sharda as Qasma
- Raju Mavani as Phala Keshto
- Mukesh Tiwari as Paglajaan (the main antagonist)
- Raza Murad as Narrator (uncredited role)

== Track listing ==
No.	Title	Singer(s)	Length
1.	"Chori Chori Akhiyon Mein"	Anuradha Paudwal, Mohammed Salamat	5:33
2.	"Na Jaane Kya Jadoo Kiya"	Sonu Nigam, Vicky	4:34
3.	"Oh Calcutta"	Sunidhi Chauhan, Abhijeet	5:13
4.	"Na Jaane Kya Jadoo Kiya - 2"	Vicky	4:32
5.	"Malum Nahin Mujhko"	Sonu Nigam, Kavita Krishnamurthy, Vinod Rathod	11:26
6.	"Na Jaane Kya Jadoo Kiya - 1"	Sonu Nigam	4:33
7.	"Papaji Tusi Great Ho"	Sonu Nigam	4:38
8.	"Dhol Bajhe"	Udit Narayan, Kavita Krishnamurthy, Mohammad Aziz	6:41
9.	"Oh Calcutta (version 2)"	Abhijeet, Sunidhi Chauhan	5:11
10.	"Malum Nahin Mujhko"	Ali-Ghani, Sonu Nigam	9:03
11.	"Ishq Na Hota"	Anuradha Paudwal
