= Luv Sinha =

Indian actor

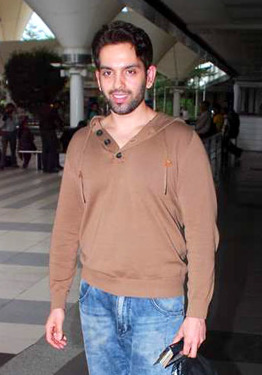
- Born: 5 June 1983 (age 43); Patna, Bihar, India
- Occupations: Actor; politician
- Years active: 2010–present
- Political party: Indian National Congress
- Parents: Shatrughan Sinha (father); Poonam Sinha (mother)
- Relatives: Sonakshi Sinha (sister)

Luv Sinha is an Indian actor and politician who works in Hindi films. He began his career by playing the lead role in the Hindi film Sadiyaan (2010). He also starred in J. P. Dutta's Paltan (2018). He is the son of actors Shatrughan Sinha and Poonam Sinha and the elder brother of actress Sonakshi Sinha. Luv Sinha studied filmmaking at the New York Film Academy.

== Filmography ==
Year	Film	Role	Notes
2010	Sadiyaan	Ishaan	
2018	Paltan	Second Lieutenant Attar Singh, 2 Grenadiers	
2023	Gadar 2	Farid	

== Political career ==
He contested in 2020 Bihar Legislative Assembly election from INC in Bankipur Constituency against Nitin Nabin from BJP and lost by 39,036 votes.
