= Operation Fryday =

2023 Indian Hindi-language film

- Directed by: Vishram Sawant
- Screenplay by: Vishram Sawant
- Produced by: Swaty Satyam; Venkatrao l Satyam
- Starring: Randeep Hooda; Suniel Shetty; Nitu Chandra
- Cinematography: Samala Bhasker
- Edited by: Nipun Gupta
- Music by: Amar Mohile; Vikaas Vishwakarma
- Production company: Tutri Ventures
- Distributed by: ZEE5
- Release date: 26 January 2023
- Country: India
- Language: Hindi

Operation Fryday is a 2023 Indian Hindi-language film, written and directed by Vishram Sawant. The film stars Randeep Hooda, Suniel Shetty and Nitu Chandra in lead roles. The film was released on 26 January 2023 by ZEE5 on its official OTT platform.

== Plot ==
Ghulam (Randeep Hooda) works as an informer for encounter specialist Sada Nair (Sunil Shetty). His driving force is ensuring his younger brother’s education, and he spares no effort to support him. Tragedy strikes when his brother is killed in a gang war— a loss Ghulam blames on the Mumbai police.

Disillusioned, he distances himself from the force and starts his own business. Soon, a businessman hires him to deliver packages. Unaware of their contents, Ghulam’s involvement inadvertently triggers a series of bomb blasts across Mumbai.

Shaken by the devastation and betrayal, he resolves to take matters into his own hands, setting out alone to hunt down and avenge the masterminds behind the attacks.

== Cast ==
- Randeep Hooda as Ghulam
- Suniel Shetty as Sada Nair
- Nitu Chandra
- Kiran Rathod
- Rukhsar Rehman
- Michelle Krusiec
- Zakir Hussain
- Siddharth Jadhav
- Mrunal Jain
- Nitesh Kalbande

== Reviews ==
Archana Khurana of The Times of India wrote "Given Bollywood’s track record in the crime drama genre, ‘Operation Fryday’ could have been a pleasant watch if it had been released a decade ago when it was actually shot. But, for now, it's best to give it a pass".

== Production ==
The film was originally titled Shooter in 2012. The film was shot in Mumbai and Lucknow.
