= Mazhar Kamran =

Indian filmmaker

- Born: India
- Education: IIT Madras; Film and Television Institute of India
- Occupations: Film director and cinematographer
- Writing career
- Period: 1989-present
- Notable works: Satya; Mohandas
- Website: www.mazharkamran.in

Mazhar Kamran is an Indian film and documentary film director and cinematographer.

== Early life and career ==
Kamran graduated with a B.Tech. in Electrical Engineering from the Indian Institute of Technology Madras, but because of his love for films he chose film making as a profession. He started his career as a cinematographer in the 1998 Ram Gopal Varma film Satya.

Kamran studied cinematography from Film and Television Institute of India (FTII). Kamran's directorial debut Mohandas dealt with stolen identity.

He is a faculty member in filmmaking at the IDC School of Design (IDC SoD) at IIT Bombay.

== Filmography ==
=== Director ===
- Mohandas (2008)

=== Cinematographer ===
- Satya (1998)
- Kaun? (1999)
- Tarkieb (2000)
- Jhankaar Beats (2003)
- Masti (2004)
- Mohandas (2008)

=== Documentary ===
- Ainie Apa

Film on the eminent Urdu author Qurratulain Hyder for the archives of Sahitya Akademi The 30 minute film fuses Hyder's memories with her writings along with reflections from literary figures. Hyder is considered to be a trendsetter novelist in the world of Urdu literature. Her monumental work is ‘Aag Ka Darya’ which moves from 4BC to the post independence period.

- Lucknow Legacy of an Era

Film on his home town Lucknow for UP Tourism

- In Search of the Agaria.

Film on the iron-smelting tribe Agaria for the History Channel (FOX India) The Agaria Tribes are an indigenous tribe in India and are known for their traditional technique of iron smelting. Yet this traditional knowledge is fast fading with fewer Agarias practicing iron smelting and instead turning to metal work or farming to meet their needs. Presented under the series "Colours of India", In Search of the Agaria, directed by Mazhar Kamran, is a film that revolves around this theme. The film documents Kamran's search of an agrarian iron smelter and is interspersed with the view points of various experts, graphical representations and the lifestyle of this tribe.

== Awards ==
=== Nominations ===
- Grand Prix (Regard d'Or) Fribourg International Film Festival 2009
- New Directors, San Francisco International Film Festival 2009
- Special Jury Prize (won) Innsbruck International Film Festival, Austria
