= Sadiyaan =

- Film poster
- Directed by: Raj Kanwar
- Written by: Abhay Kanwar; Raj Kanwar; Javed Siddiqui (dialogues)
- Produced by: Raj Kanwar
- Starring: Luv Sinha; Feryna Wazheir; Rekha; Rishi Kapoor; Hema Malini
- Cinematography: Anshul Chobey
- Edited by: Kuldip Mohan
- Music by: Songs: Adnan Sami; Score: Raju Rao
- Production company: Inderjit Films Combine
- Distributed by: PVR Pictures
- Release date: 2 April 2010
- Running time: 162 minutes
- Country: India
- Language: Hindi

Sadiyaan (transl. Centuries) is a 2010 Indian Hindi-language drama film directed by Raj Kanwar, starring Luv Sinha, Feryna Wazheir, Rishi Kapoor, Hema Malini, Jawed Sheikh, and Rekha. The story is about a family during the partition of India. It was released on 2 April 2010.

== Plot ==
During the 1947 partition, the Lahore-based family of Rajveer (Rishi Kapoor) and Amrit (Rekha) had to flee Pakistan and settle in Amritsar, Punjab. In the house where they get to stay, Amrit finds an abandoned baby boy of a Muslim family who owned the house but fled to Pakistan because of communal riots. Amrit raises the boy as her own, and he grows up to be Ishaan (Luv Sinha). During a summer camp visit to Kashmir, Ishaan falls in love with Chandni (Feryna Wazheir). When he goes to her house to ask for her hand in marriage, her father (Deep Dhillon) and uncle (Ahmed Khan) tell him to forget her as they are against her marrying a Sikh boy. When Amrit and Rajveer come to know about this, they finally declare the truth to Ishaan that he is a Muslim in reality and not their child. He doesn't believe them, and Chandni's parents refuse to believe it without proof. The old couple then decides to track Ishaan's real parents down and also succeed. Ishaan's real mother, Benazir (Hema Malini), comes down with his real father (Javed Sheikh) to take back custody of a now-grown-up Ishaan. Chandni's parents immediately agree to the marriage when Ishaan's real parents visit their house. What complications arise when Ishaan's parents start making plans to take Ishaan and his bride back to Pakistan and how they are handled by the principal characters forms the rest of the plot.

== Cast ==
- Luv Sinha as Ishaan R Singh
- Feryna Wazheir as Chandni Noor Mohammed
- Rekha as Amrit R Singh
- Hema Malini as Benazir Shahbuddin
- Rishi Kapoor as Rajveer Singh
- Jawed Sheikh as Pervez Shahbuddin
- Vivek Shauq as Haldiram
- Shakeel Siddiqui as Mamu
- Deep Dhillon as Imran Noor Mohammed
- Ahmed Khan as Noor Mohammed
- Avtar Gill as Kartar Singh
- Gurpreet Ghuggi as Professor Harbhajan Chandok
- Neetu Chandra as Dancer / Singer

== Soundtrack ==
- "Taron Bhari Hai Ye Raat Sajan" - Adnan Sami & Sunidhi Chauhan
- "Dekha Tujhay Jo Pehli Baar" - Shaan
- "Jadu Nasha, Ehsas Kya" - Shaan & Sadhana Sargam
- "Man Mouji Matwala" - Mika Singh
- "Pehla Pehla Tejurba Hai" - Kunal Ganjawala & Sunidhi Chauhan
- "Sargoshiyo Ke Kya Silsile Hai" - Raja Hasan & Shreya Ghoshal
- "Sona Lagdha Mahi Sona Lagdha" - Richa Sharma & Sabri Brothers
- "Waqt Ne Jo Bij Boyaa" - Rekha Bhardwaj

== Awards and nominations ==
=== 2011 Zee Cine Awards ===
Nominated

- Best Male Debut – Luv Sinha
- Best Female Debut – Feryna Wazheir
