= Dharti Kahe Pukar Ke (2006 film) =

2006 Indian film by Aslam Sheikh

- Directed by: Aslam Sheikh
- Written by: Aslam Sheikh
- Produced by: Nirmal Jani
- Starring: Manoj Tiwari; Sharbani Mukherjee
- Cinematography: Nirmal Jani
- Music by: Dhananjay Mishra
- Distributed by: Yashi Films Pvt. Ltd.
- Release date: 10 February 2006
- Running time: 148 minutes
- Country: India
- Language: Bhojpuri

Dharti Kahe Pukar Ke is a 2006 Bhojpuri Drama film directed by Aslam Sheikh. The film stars Manoj Tiwari, and Sharbani Mukherjee with Bollywood star Ajay Devgn in a special appearance. The music was conducted by Dhananjay Mishra and the lyrics by Vinay Bihari. Original background music was composed by Anil Saxena. The film was released on 10 February 2006 . The film was a super hit at the box office and received generally positive reviews from the critics.

== Plot ==
The movie charts the emotional journey of Arjun. A college student with dreams of becoming an IPS officer, Arjun is basically a son of the soil. One day, when he is coming back to his village on a vacation with his bosom friend Deepak, a car accident changes his life dramatically. Deepak, who is driving the car, happens to run over a villager, Shankar, who subsequently succumbs to his injuries. Arjun, however, insists on taking the blame on himself and surrenders to the police.

Even as he does this, he is aware that by doing so, he is not merely distancing himself from his dreams but also from his beloved Rajni. In his darkest hour, SP Kunal Singh enters his life like sunlight and obtains his conditional freedom. What also draws Arjun and Kunal close to each other is their distaste for the activities of the village bully, Veer Mongia.

Kunal inspires Arjun to fight Veer Mongia in the village election. How Kunal (Who is also in the guise of a dacoit, Kanhaiyya) manages to turn the tables on Veer Mongia and how Arjun finally escapes from the shadow of guilt, form the climax.

== Cast ==
- Manoj Tiwari as Arjun
- Ajay Devgn as SP Kunal Singh (special appearance)
- Sharbani Mukherjee as Rajun
