= Kowad =

Village in Maharashtra

- Town
- Location in Maharashtra, India
- Coordinates: 15.9885°N 74.3807°E
- State: Maharashtra
- District: Kolhapur
- Tehsil: Chandgad

Population (2021)
  - Total: 3,837

Kowad is a town located in Chandgad tehsil in Kolhapur district of Maharashtra. According to the 2021 census, the town has a population of 3837. Kowad is situated on the banks of the river Tamraparni. The village lies close to the border of Karnataka, near Belgaum.Abc

== See also ==
- Wikinews : A Christian congregation attacked in India, 12 injured
