= Sharbani Mukherjee =

Indian actress

Sharbani Mukherji
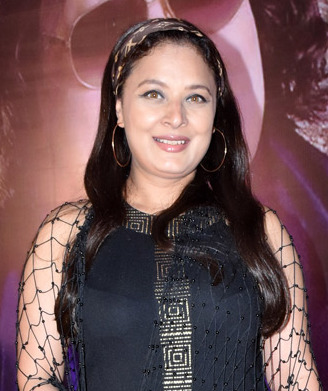
- Mukherjee in 2018
- Born: India
- Occupation: Actress
- Years active: 1997 - 2015
- Parent: Rono Mukerji

Sharbani Mukherjee (alternate name: Sharbani Mukherji) is an Indian actress working predominantly in Hindi films and in a few Malayalam language films to her credits.

== Biography ==
She is the daughter of Rono Mukerji and thus part of the Mukherjee-Samarth family. Her paternal uncles were Deb Mukherjee, Joy Mukherjee and Shomu Mukherjee. Her paternal grandfather, Sashadhar Mukherjee, was a filmmaker. His wife Satirani Devi was the sister of Ashok Kumar, Anoop Kumar and Kishore Kumar. Her paternal cousins are actresses Rani Mukerji, Kajol and Tanisha, director Ayan Mukerji and noted MIT algebraic geometer Davesh Maulik. Her brother Samrat Mukerji is also a Bollywood and Bengali actor.

== Career ==
Sharbani made her debut with the hit film Border. She was featured opposite Samir Soni in the song "Ghar Aaja Sonia", sung by Shazia Mansoor. She has also acted in various ads. By 2008 she shifted her focus into Mollywood, her debut Malayalam film Raakilipattu was a mystery-thriller film directed by Priyadarshan and co-starring Jyothika, Tabu and Ishitta Arun. She played the lead role in the film Sufi Paranja Katha. It is widely regarded as one of the defining movies of the Malayalam New Wave.

== Filmography ==
Year	Film	Role	Language	Notes
1997	Border	Phoolkanwar	Hindi	Debut
2000	Snegithiye	Radhika Menon	Tamil	Tamil Debut;Bilingual film shot as Raakilippatu in Malayalam
2001	Mitti	Pooja	Hindi	
2002	Ansh: The Deadly Part	Shweta	Hindi	
2003	Kaise Kahoon Ke... Pyaar Hai	Priya	Hindi	
2003	Aanch	Vidya	Hindi	
2006	Dharti Kahe Pukar Ke	Rajni	Bhojpuri	
2007	Raakilipattu	Radhika Menon	Malayalam	Malayalam Debut
2008	Mohandas	Kasturi	Hindi	
2010	332 Mumbai to India	Tanu	Hindi	
2010	Sufi Paranja Katha	Kaarthi, Suhara	Malayalam	
2010	Athma Kadha	Mary	Malayalam	
2015	Namukkore Akasham	Gaury (old)	Malayalam	

== See also ==
- List of Bollywood Clans: The Mukherjees
- Mukherjee-Samarth family
- Mohnish Behl
