= Nakul Vaid =

Indian film actor

- Born: Mumbai, Maharashtra, India
- Occupation: Actor
- Years active: 2002–2022

Nakul Vaid is a former Indian actor. He is known for his roles in the films Baghban (2003), Chak De! India (2007) and The Lunchbox (2013). His most notable role was in the 2009 critically acclaimed film Mohandas.

== Career ==
He rose to fame in 2002 when he played the younger brother of Rajesh Khanna in the television series Ittefaq. The Indian Express in their review appreciated the storyline but criticized his role writing that Vaid "neither looks nor sounds like a Mohandas".

== Filmography ==
=== Films ===
Year	Title	Role	Ref.
2002	Samvedna		
2002	Vadh	Inspector Vijay Singh	
2003	Baghban	Kapil	
2004	Ab Tak Chhappan	Sub-Inspector Jatin Shukla	
2006	Yatra	Mohan	
2006	With Love Tumhara	Akshay	
2007	Chak De! India	Rakesh	
2008	Rama Rama Kya Hai Dramaa?		
2009	Mohandas	Mohandas	
2011	Happi	Adil	
2013	The Lunchbox	Rajiv	
2014	The Xpose	Virman Shah	
2016	Shankhachil	BSF Jawan	

=== Television ===
Year	Title	Role	Ref.
1998–2001	Hip Hip Hurray		
2021–2022	Zindagi Mere Ghar Aana	Dr. Karan Sakhuja	
