= 332 Mumbai to India =

2010 film directed by Mahesh Pandey

- Promotional poster
- Directed by: Mahesh Pandey
- Written by: Chirag Jain
- Produced by: Sangeeth Sivan
- Starring: Amitriyaan; Ali Asgar; Chetan Pandit; Vijay Mishra; Sharbani Mukherjee
- Cinematography: Krishna Ramanan
- Music by: Shamir Tandon
- Production company: Sangeeth Sivan Productions
- Distributed by: K Sera Sera
- Release date: 17 December 2010
- Country: India
- Language: Hindi

332 Mumbai to India is a Hindi thriller film directed by Mahesh Pandey and starring Amitriyaan, Ali Asgar, Chetan Pandit, Vijay Mishra, and Sharbani Mukherjee. It was produced by Sangeeth Sivan. The film was released on 17 December 2010 under the Sangeeth Sivan Productions banner.

== Plot ==
A misled youth commits a stupid crime just to prove a point. There are repercussions on the general public and people connected to him.

== Cast ==
- Amitriyaan in a lead role Rahul Raj
- Ali Asgar as Ismail
- Chetan Pandit as Thakur Baba
- Vijay Mishra as Santosh
- Sharbani Mukherjee as Tanu
