= D (film) =

- Film's poster
- Directed by: Vishram Sawant
- Written by: Ram Gopal Varma; Manish Gupta
- Produced by: Ronnie Screwvala; Ram Gopal Varma
- Starring: Randeep Hooda; Chunky Pandey; Rukhsar Rehman; Isha Koppikar; Yashpal Sharma; Sushant Singh; Goga Kapoor; Ishrat Ali; Nagesh Bhonsle
- Cinematography: Srikanth Naroj
- Edited by: Nipun Gupta; Amit Parmar
- Music by: Prasanna Shekhar; Nitin Raikwar
- Production companies: UTV Motion Pictures; Sahara One Motion Pictures; RGV Film Company; K Sera Sera
- Release date: 3 June 2005
- Running time: 107 minutes
- Country: India
- Language: Hindi
- Budget: est. ₹3.5 crore
- Box office: est. ₹8.5 crore

D is a 2005 Indian Hindi-language crime thriller film directed by Vishram Sawant, co-written by Manish Gupta and Ram Gopal Varma. Produced by Varma and Ronnie Screwvala, it was released in India on 3 June 2005. It is the third film in the Gangster film series.

The film is a sequel to Varma's 2002 film Company. Like its predecessor, D is based on the real-life Mumbai underworld organization, the D-Company. The three Varma films Satya, Company and D are together considered an Indian Gangster Trilogy. The film features Randeep Hooda in his first lead appearance.

== Plot ==
Deshu (Randeep Hooda), a mechanic working in Dubai, returns to India after his mother's death in order to console his grieving sister and retired police constable father. Sometime later, Deshu unwittingly becomes the witness to a murder, when the henchmen of a gang led by Mangli chase and kill a man in front of him. Even though he is aggressively pursued by the police to be a state witness, Deshu chooses not to testify after the gang intimidates and threatens him. Seeking revenge for the harassment, he joins a rival gang led by Hashim and ultimately kills Mangli. Due to his bravery and intelligence, Deshu quickly rises up the ranks, becoming the gang's unofficial second-in-command, much to the dismay of Hashim's two sons, Mukarram and Shabbir.

Deshu begins a relationship with beautiful Bollywood actress, Bhakti Bhatnagar, after protecting her from sexual harassment by a male colleague, an association that opens him up to connections that go above and beyond the level of the gang. Resentful of his meteoric rise to power and his glamorous relationship, Mukarram and Shabbir begin to plot his demise. They plant the seeds of doubt in Hashim's mind and try to turn their father against his once most trusted member. At the same time, the Mumbai Police have begun to monitor Deshu and assign an encounter specialist to the case in the hopes of bringing him down.

Hashim finally relents and allows his sons to carry out an unwarranted attack on Deshu, his friend and partner, Raghav. Raghav and others are killed while Deshu survives; hellbent on revenge. He takes on the gang single-handedly and eliminates those involved in this attempted assassination one by one until he finally kills Mukarram and Shabbir. He intentionally spares the life of Hashim, since he is aware that Hashim has nothing left and will never be able to rebuild his gang again - effectively condemning him to a life of prolonged misery. Deshu, having successfully established himself as a crime lord and managing to evade the police on many occasions, crowns himself the Underworld King and dreams of forming the "D" company - an organized crime syndicate that he plans to run like a well-tuned machine from outside India's borders.

== Cast ==
- Randeep Hooda as Deshu
- Rukhsar Rehman as Bhakti Bhatnagar
- Chunky Pandey as Raghav
- Isha Koppikar as Gunjan
- Goga Kapoor as Hashim Bhai
- Yashpal Sharma as Shabbir
- Sushant Singh as Mukarram
- Jeeva as Gangaram
- Raju Mavani as Mangli
- Ishrat Ali as Tambe
- Jaspal Sandhu as Uncle
- Zakir Hussain as Babban Tikkekar
- Deepak Shirke as Qureshi
- Raj Arjun as Bhupesh
- Mukesh Tiwari as Mukesh
- Dinesh Lamba as Dinesh
- Rajpal Yadav as Dance Artiste (uncredited)
