= Vishram Sawant =

Indian film director

- Born: Mumbai, Maharashtra
- Occupations: Director, Photographer
- Years active: 2003 - present

Vishram Shivram Sawant is an Indian film director. He made his directorial debut with D, which is about the meteoric rise of a fictional underworld don, Deshu (played by Randeep Hooda), which appears to be loosely based upon Dawood Ibrahim's career (though Sawant denies it). His next film was Risk in which the same actor plays an errant police inspector with Vinod Khanna as villain.

Sawant was a photographer by profession before he joined films and designed Ram Gopal Varma's office at his company The Factory. He also did publicity work for Varma's horror film Bhoot.

== Filmography ==
- D (2005)
- Risk (2007)
- Operation Fryday (2023) (Note: Originally titled Shooter, the film was stuck in development hell for more than a decade before finally releasing in 2023.)
