= Risk (2007 film) =

- Directed by: Vishram Sawant
- Written by: Atul Taishete
- Produced by: Parag Sanghvi
- Starring: Vinod Khanna; Randeep Hooda; Tanushree Dutta; Zakir Hussain
- Cinematography: Mahesh Muthuswami
- Edited by: Vivek Shah
- Music by: Akbar Sami; Bappi-Tutul
- Release date: 19 January 2007
- Running time: 155 minutes
- Country: India
- Language: Hindi

Risk is a 2007 Indian Hindi-language action thriller film directed by Vishram Sawant. It stars Vinod Khanna, Randeep Hooda, Tanushree Dutta, Zakir Hussain, Yashpal Sharma and Anant Jog in the lead roles. The film is based on the Mumbai underworld. Randeep Hooda plays the role of an honest cop, Suryakant Satam, fighting against the might of a Bangkok-based don (crime lord) Khalid Bin Jamal, played by Vinod Khanna. The music was composed by Bapi-Tutul, Akbar Sami and Sandesh Shandilya, and the lyrics are written by Sandeep Nath, Amitabh Verma and Sudhir. The background score is composed by Amar Mohile. This film was remade in Telugu as Mahankali (2011) starring Rajasekhar, Madhurima and Pradeep Rawat.

== Plot ==
For years, Khalid Bin Jamal has ruled the Mumbai crime underworld by staying in Bangkok, Thailand. Despite his distance from Mumbai, Khalid is able to control the Mumbai underworld by keeping the ruling members of his network very close to him. He is extremely ruthless and shows no hesitation or remorse towards his enemies.

The Indian police have been trying for years to extradite Khalid to India, but in vain. Inspector Suryakant has been in the police force for some time and has been keeping track of Khalid's activities. He makes up his mind to put an end to Khalid's criminal empire and bring Khalid to justice. To do so, he starts carrying out encounters against Jamal's henchmen. Over the course of a few weeks, Khalid's network suffers, as his men are simply killed in encounters and raids by Suryakant, who is supported by DCP Uttam Bhandari.

Khalid becomes increasingly alarmed but comes up with a counter-plan. He arranges for one of his leading associates, the politician Devki Wardhan, to be attacked, while Suryakant is arresting her. Her opponent, the Home Minister A. R. Sarang, has been known to be in favour with Suryakant and is blackmailed by Khalid into open-firing on Devki Wardhan. This implicates Suryakant as being an accomplice to Devki Wardhan's attempted murder, as two of Devki's men are shot dead by Suryakant. Soon, a string of allegations that include taking bribes from different crime lords is formed against Suryakant. His plan to capture Khalid with bold moves thus backfires because of Khalid's premeditated scheme.

The Police Commissioner is close to Devki Wardhan and is against Suryakant and tries all the time to suppress him. Suryakant's girlfriend, Shraddha, also does not support him and distances herself from him due to his involvement with the underworld. Eventually, Suryakant is jailed. He receives messages from Khalid. He is offered back his police officer position by Khalid, as long as he does his bidding for him. He is also handsomely rewarded financially. Suryakant starts working energetically for Khalid and wipes out Khalid's sworn enemy, S.P. Naidu's men. Arbaaz, Khalid's hot-headed brother, smells a rat and suspects the designs of Suryakant. He travels to India with Hari without informing Khalid to personally deal with Naidu. Arbaaz, along with Hari and Suryakant, go to Naidu to finish him. He is killed by Arbaaz, but Suryakant reveals his true colors by killing Arbaaz, Hari, and Home Minister A. R. Sarang. He makes it appear as if Arbaaz had murdered Sarang and Hari.

The supposed death of a Home Minister at the hands of Khalid's brother is enough to have Khalid extradited to Mumbai for trial. However, despite all of Suryakant's painstaking uncovering of Khalid's illicit activities, the Indian police cannot make a firm case against him. Moreover, Khalid heavily bribes the police prosecutor in his favour. Khalid is sure his case will be dismissed by the Court and that he will leave India in a day, but before doing so, he wants retribution for Arbaaz's death and orders his men to dispose of Suryakant's comrades in the police force. Shraddha realizes her folly of not being supportive of Suryakant and asks for his apology. Suryakant is told that Shraddha's life is in danger and that she will be killed by Khalid's men. He decides to take the last stand and sends Shraddha safely out of the country.

Khalid sends a message to Suryakant to meet him in jail. Before Suryakant has a chance to find out about the murders of DCP Bhandari, Inspector Shridhar and his other close colleagues, Khalid himself, tells him that he killed them during their meeting. He also tells Suryakant that he will go free, despite everything he has done. Suryakant is shocked by the revelation and decides to eliminate Khalid. He storms the heavily guarded jail, where Khalid is being held, and manages to kill him, though he is mortally wounded. Upon seeing Khalid's lifeless body, he smiles.

== Cast ==
- Randeep Hooda as Suryakant Satam
- Vinod Khanna as Khalid Bin Jamal: Biggest don (ruler) of the crime-ridden Mumbai underworld.
- Yashpal Sharma as Arbaaz Bin Jamal: The hot-tempered brother of Khalid.
- Zakir Hussain as S.P. Naidu: A rival gang leader of Khalid's.
- Anant Jog as A.R. Sarang: Home-minister of Mumbai. He has many underworld connections.
- Seema Biswas as Devki Wardhan: associate of Khalid's. She is heavily involved in politics.
- Tanushree Dutta as Shraddha: Suryakant's Girlfriend.
- Ganesh Yadav as Inspector Shridhar: Suryakant's superior and an honest officer.
- D. Santosh as Khalid Jamal's mentally challenged son.
- Makarand Deshpande as Hari, Khaled's man.
- Shivkumar Subramaniam as DCP Uttam Bhandari.
- Chetan Pandit as Devki's lawyer.
- Murari Kumar as a goon.
- Madhuri Bhagwat as Suryakant's mother.
- Pradeep Velankar as Police Commissioner
- Suhas Palshikhar
- Rajendra Sethi
- Ashraful Haque

== Soundtrack ==
The music was composed by Akbar Sami, Bapi–Tutul, Sandesh Shandilya and released by Home Records Audio.

Risk

Soundtrack album by Akbar Sami Bapi–Tutul Sandesh Shandilya
- Released: 2007
- Recorded: 2007
- Genre: Soundtrack
- Length: 23:16
- Label: Home Records Audio
- Producers: Akbar Sami; Bapi–Tutul; Sandesh Shandilya

Track list
No.	Title	Lyrics	Music	Singer(s)	Length
1.	"Hitchki"	Amitabh Verma	Akbar Sami	Sonu Kakkar	4:30
2.	"Lakhon Karodo Mein"	Sandeep Nath	Bapi–Tutul	Krishna Beura	4:45
3.	"Kali Sadke"	Sudhir Kumar	Sandesh Shandilya	Kunal Ganjawala	4:11
4.	"Hitchki (Remix)"	Amitabh Verma	Akbar Sami	Sonu Kakkar	4:25
5.	"Le Le Risk (Trance)"		Bapi–Tutul	Instrumental	3:13
6.	"Theme Music"		Bapi–Tutul	Instrumental	2:12
Total length:					23:16
