= Randeep Hooda =

Indian actor (born 1976)

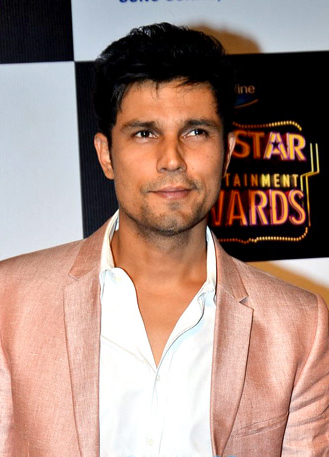
- Hooda in 2014
- Born: 20 August 1976 (age 50); Rohtak, Haryana, India
- Occupation: Actor
- Years active: 2001–present
- Spouse: Lin Laishram (m. 2023)
- Children: 1

Randeep Hooda (pronounced [rəɳdiːp ɦʊɖːa]; born 20 August 1976) is an Indian actor, who works predominantly in Hindi cinema. Hooda is known for his versatility and physical transformations for his roles. He made his Hindi film debut with Monsoon Wedding (2001). He had a turning point in his career with the gangster film Once Upon a Time in Mumbaai (2010), and continued to gain attention with supporting roles in films such as Saheb, Biwi Aur Gangster (2011), Jannat 2 (2012), Jism 2 (2012), Cocktail (2012), Heroine (2012) and Jaat (2025).

Hooda starred in leading roles in several films, including Murder 3 (2013), John Day (2013) and Rang Rasiya (2014); for later, he was nominated for Filmfare Award for Best Actor. He received widespread critical acclaim for his performance in films such as Highway (2014), Main Aur Charles (2015) and Sarbjit (2016). Other notable films are Do Lafzon Ki Kahani (2016), his biggest hits Kick (2014) and Sultan (2016), and also the action film Baaghi 2 (2018). He has also starred in the American film Extraction (2020) and the television series CAT (2022).

== Early life and background ==
Hooda was born on 20 August 1976, in Rohtak, Haryana, India in a Haryanvi Jat family. His father Ranbir Singh Hooda, is a medical surgeon and his mother Asha Hooda, is a social worker. He spent most of his childhood with his grandmother in their hometown as his parents travelled extensively and resided in the Middle East for the most part. He has an elder sister, Anjali Hooda Sangwan, a medical (MBBS, MD) doctor trained in India and in the United States, and a younger brother, Sandeep Hooda, a Software Engineer working in Singapore.

He was educated at Motilal Nehru School of Sports (MNSS), a boarding school in Rai, Haryana, where he participated in swimming and equestrian sports and won medals at the national level. Hooda later developed an interest in theatre and participated in school productions, one of which he directed. In an interview with Rediff.com, he said he enjoyed appearing in front of people. However, his family wanted him to become a doctor and he was transferred to Delhi Public School, R. K. Puram in New Delhi. Hooda described the transition from an environment in which he was popular to one in which he was known as "difficult".

After completing his schooling, Hooda moved to Melbourne, Australia in 1995, where he studied for a bachelor's degree in marketing and a master's degree in business management and human resource management. During that period, he worked in a Chinese restaurant, a car wash, as a waiter, and as a taxi driver for few years.

During mid-2000, Hooda returned to India and worked in the marketing department of an airline. He subsequently started modelling and working in amateur theatre in Delhi. While rehearsing for the play To Teach His Own, director Mira Nair approached Hooda to audition for a role in her upcoming film.

Besides films, Randeep Hooda came into the limelight because of his relationship with Sushmita Sen, with whom he eventually broke up. Hooda married Manipuri actress and model Lin Laishram in a traditional Manipuri Meitei wedding ceremony in November 2023.

== Film career ==
=== 2001–09: Debut and struggle ===
Hooda made his acting debut in Mira Nair's film Monsoon Wedding (2001), playing a non-resident Indian from Australia. Although the film was a critical and commercial success, Hooda waited four years for a second project. In the meantime, he worked in theatre and appeared in television commercials to support himself financially. He also attended and assisted an imagination and improvisation workshop conducted by Naseeruddin Shah at the National School of Drama in New Delhi.

In 2005, Hooda was cast as the male lead in Ram Gopal Varma's gangster film D. His performance in the film received positive reviews; Taran Adarsh wrote, "D wouldn't be what it is without Randeep. He changes his expressions like a chameleon changes colours and that's where he scores." After D, Hooda appeared in a series of critically and commercially unsuccessful films including Darna Zaroori Hai (2006), Risk (2007), Ru Ba Ru (2008), and Love Khichdi (2009).

=== 2010–18: Breakthrough and critical acclaim ===
The year 2010 marked a significant turning point in Hooda's career; he appeared in Milan Luthria's Once Upon a Time in Mumbaai, a period action drama depicting the rise of organised crime in Mumbai. Co-starring alongside Ajay Devgn, Emraan Hashmi, Kangana Ranaut and Prachi Desai, Hooda played a police officer in the film. His performance in the film was variously appreciated by critics. Sudish Kamath of The Hindu compared his screen presence to that of Amitabh Bachchan and wrote that despite his limited screen time, "[he] chews the scenery around him with [...] his baritone firing away dialogue as if he were born to play this role." Film critic Komal Nahta described him as a "revelation" in his own right. The film was a critical and commercial success, earning over ₹780 million (US$8.3 million) in India. Hooda too attributed his subsequent success to the film saying that his professional prospects really changed after the role. He had been on sabbatical from acting prior to the role and noted that it, "brought me back in a big way. Now other directors and production houses look at me as an actor who can carry bigger parts and a longer screen presence."

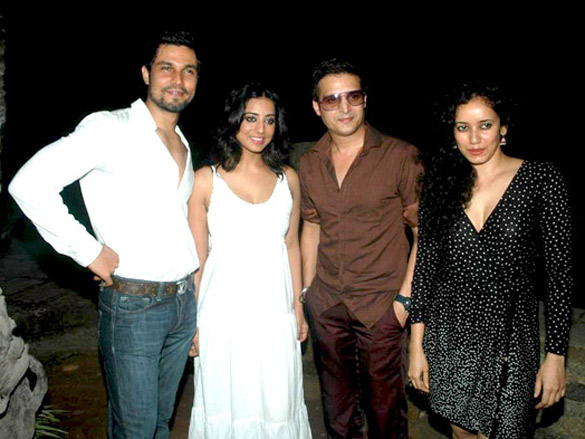
Hooda with Mahie Gill, Jimmy Shergill and Shreya Narayan at the Saheb Biwi aur Gangster success party in 2011.

The following year, Hooda featured in Tigmanshu Dhulia's romantic thriller Saheb, Biwi Aur Gangster with Jimmy Shergill and Mahie Gill. The film (and his portrayal of a gangster who falls in love with a married woman while working as her driver) earned rave reviews from critics. In an interview with Digital Spy, Hooda said "My inspiration for this character went back to my roots in Haryana, to the time I grew up and people I observed. My uncles were drivers and I thought of those times and people around me." Nikhat Kazmi of The Times of India called him "absolutely mesmerising"; Gaurav Malani wrote, "Randeep Hooda plays the best character of his career so far and gets immense scope to show his performance prowess. The passion, obsession, emotions and expressions he brings to his character is simply outstanding."

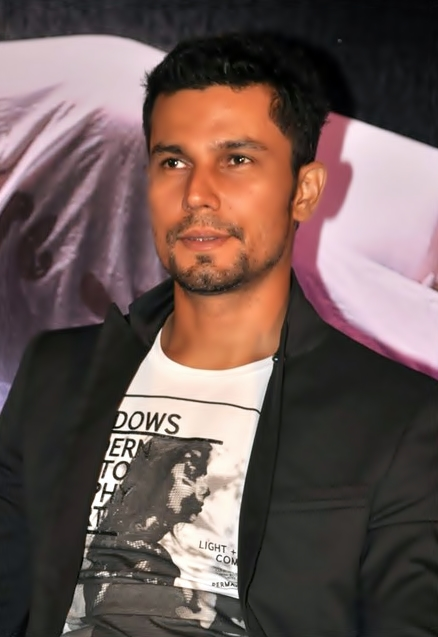
Hooda at Jism 2 conference

Hooda's first film in 2012 was Kunal Deshmukh's crime thriller Jannat 2, a sequel to Jannat (2008). Jannat 2 received mixed reviews from critics and Hooda was praised for his performance. Taran Adarsh wrote, "the actor delivers yet another knockout performance. He dominates in several sequences, making you realize that if given an opportunity, the guy can steal the thunder from the best of actors." Sonia Chopra of Sify said, "Randeep Hooda is the best thing about the film." It was a commercial success and earned a domestic revenue of over ₹410 million (US$4.4 million).

Hooda's next appearance was in Pooja Bhatt's erotic thriller Jism 2 opposite Sunny Leone. The film and Hooda's performance received mixed reviews from critics. Lisa Tsering of The Hollywood Reporter said Hooda "smoulders to the best of his ability in the role of a violent criminal". Rajeev Masand, who was less impressed by his performance, wrote, "The usually dependable Hooda, goes a little overboard with all the feeling; alternating clunkily between melancholic and hyper, Hooda constructs a wildly implausible character that inspires most of the unintended laughs in this film". Jism 2 was a moderate commercial success, earning ₹350 million (US$3.7 million) in India.

Hooda's final film of the year was Madhur Bhandarkar's drama Heroine, starring Kareena Kapoor, in which he played cricketer Angad Paul. Before the start of principal photography, Arunoday Singh was chosen for the role but was dropped for unknown reasons. Media reports began speculating about several actors (such as Ranbir Kapoor, Imran Khan and Prateik Babbar), although Bhandarkar later confirmed that he selected Hooda after seeing his performance in Saheb, Biwi Aur Gangster (2011). The film received mixed to negative reviews, but Hooda's performance was appreciated by the critics. Kanika Sikka of Daily News and Analysis wrote, "Randeep, as usual does justice to his role." The film was fared poorly at the domestic and international box office.

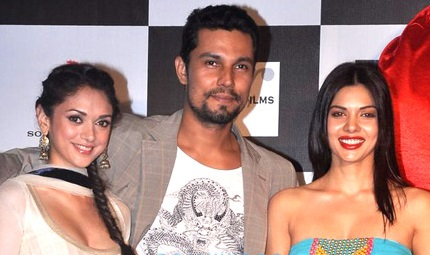
Hooda with Aditi Rao Hydari and Sara Loren promoting Murder 3 in 2013

In 2013, Hooda starred opposite Aditi Rao Hydari and Sara Loren in Vishesh Bhatt's Murder 3, an official remake of the 2011 Colombian thriller The Hidden Face. The film and his portrayal of Vikram (a fashion and wildlife photographer) garnered mixed to negative feedback from critics. A review from Mint said that Hooda "is hundreds of shades below his ability to enact a character." The film earned a worldwide gross of ₹250 million (US$2.7 million) in ten days and was an average grosser.

Later that year, Hooda acted in Ketan Mehta's biographical period film Rang Rasiya, based on the life of the 19th-century Indian painter Raja Ravi Varma. The film earned him a nomination for the Filmfare Award for Best Actor.

Hooda also featured in the thriller John Day, alongside Naseeruddin Shah.

He also appeared alongside Rani Mukerji and Saqib Saleem in a segment directed by Karan Johar for the anthology film Bombay Talkies. The film was made as a celebration of the 100th year of Indian cinema and was screened at the 2013 Cannes Film Festival.

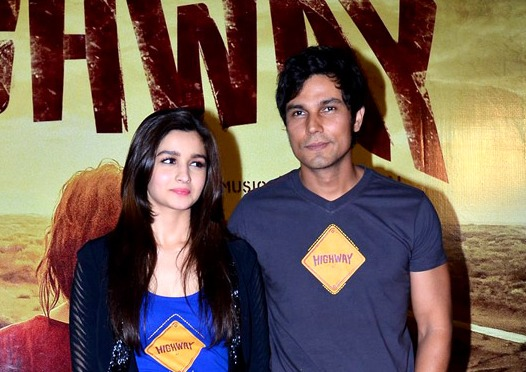
Hooda with Alia Bhatt at the first look launch of Highway in 2014

In 2014, Hooda appeared opposite Alia Bhatt in Imtiaz Ali's Highway. To get used to his character, who had a distant relationship with Bhatt's character, he avoided speaking to her for about 25 days. Parmita Uniyal for Hindustan Times praising Hooda's "nuanced yet controlled" performance wrote that he lent, "authenticity to his character".

He then starred in Sajid Nadiadwala's action film Kick, co-starring Salman Khan and Jacqueline Fernandez. The film emerged as one of Bollywood's biggest blockbusters of 2014, with the total revenue of ₹4.2 billion (US$45 million).

Hooda's last release for the year was the Emraan Hashmi and Kangana Ranaut starrer Ungli. The film focused on both a commercial failure and was panned by critics. Emphasizing on the fim's potential Mid-Day critic Shubha Shetty Saha said the film would have been "wonderful" had it not been for its "downright idiotic" dialogue.

In 2015, Hooda portrayed the serial killer Charles Sobhraj in Prawaal Raman's, Main Aur Charles. It was told from the perspective of Amod Kanth, the cop who handled his case and was also based on his 1986 jail escape. The film was released in India on 31 October 2015 to mostly positive response from critics.

In 2016, Hooda starred in four films, the first one was the drama thriller Laal Rang, based around illegal blood selling. The film was a box office failure and received a lukewarm response from critics. Hooda's performance was highlighted as the only bright spot in the film.

Omung Kumar's biographical drama Sarbjit, was his next release, where he portrayed the role of Sarabjit Singh, who was captured by Pakistan and later sentenced to death by their Supreme Court for alleged terrorism. Hooda lost eighteen kg of weight in 28 days for the preparation of the role. The film premiered at the 69th Cannes Film Festival, and received mixed reactions from critics. Anupama Chopra called Hooda "terrific". Sarbjit proved to be a box-office success.

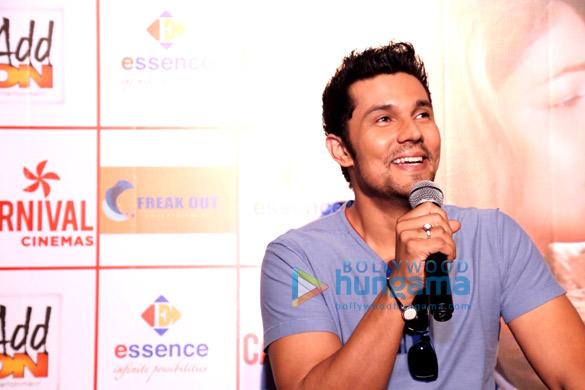
Hooda at the press conference of Do Lafzon Ki Kahani

Hooda's next release was Deepak Tijori's Do Lafzon Ki Kahani alongside Kajal Aggarwal. A remake of the 2011 Korean film Always, the film was a critical and commercial failure.

His final release of 2016 was the sports drama Sultan, co-starring Salman Khan and Anushka Sharma, where he played the coach of Sultan. With earnings of over ₹5 billion (US$53 million) worldwide, it ranks among Indian cinema's biggest grossers.

Hooda played a supporting role in the 2018 action hit Baaghi 2 after a gap of two years. He was working on a film based on the Battle of Saragarhi, but the project was ultimately dropped after being stuck in development hell for over three years.

=== 2019–present: Career expansion ===
Hooda made his Hollywood debut with the American action-thriller film Extraction (2020) starring along with Chris Hemsworth and Goldshifteh Farahani. The film was released on 24 April 2020. Netflix estimated the film will be watched by 90 million viewers in the first month of release.

Hooda played the main antagonist in Radhe (2021). The film received negative reviews from critics.

He made his television debut by starring in the Netflix series, CAT (2022). Hooda received critical acclaim for his role. He was next seen in Swatantra Veer Savarkar (2024), based on Vinayak Damodar Savarkar.

In 2025, Hooda played a Sri Lankan refugee in Jaat alongside Sunny Deol and Regina Cassandra. It became a moderate commercial successes.

== Other works ==
=== Theatre ===
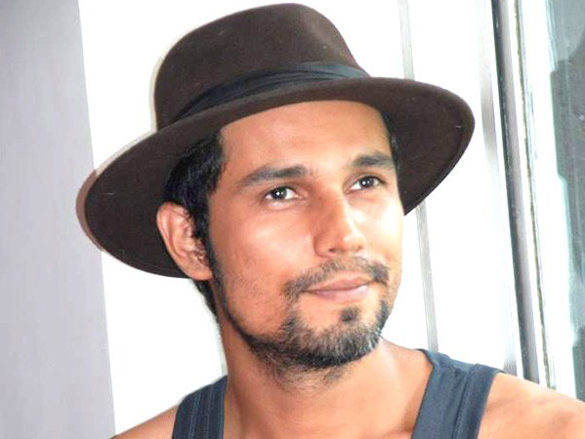
Hooda at a Motley Theatre Group Meet

Hooda has been associated with theatre since the beginning of his acting career; he is an active member of Naseeruddin Shah's Motley Theatre Troupe. In an interview with Daily News and Analysis he said, "My first stint with theatre was in school, where I was asked to wear a lion mask and roar for several minutes. My parents came to see me with a lot of expectations and sadly, they couldn't even recognise me on stage because of the mask." During his film career, Hooda has participated in theatrical productions. He said, "Juggling between the two [theatre and films] does get difficult, but I don't see myself ever give up Theatre. It's got a deeper connect with who I really am. So, if films give you the wings to fly, Theatre is a reality check, it keeps you grounded. Films can give you the satisfaction of feeling like a hero, but theatre gives you the real satisfaction of being an actor."

Hooda has appeared in Kali Shalwar Aur Kuchchh Kahaniyan (a play based on Saadat Hasan Manto's short stories), To Teach His Own, and Arms and The Man. He described the latter as a typical George Bernard Shaw play; "It is complete with elements to entertain an audience. It delves into true love, heroism and some confused relationships that are pretty baffling even in the current social structure." Hooda made his theatrical debut as a writer, adapting Lee Blessing's A Walk in the Woods into an Indian context. Ratna Pathak directed the play and Naseerudin Shah appeared in it.

=== Equestrian sports ===
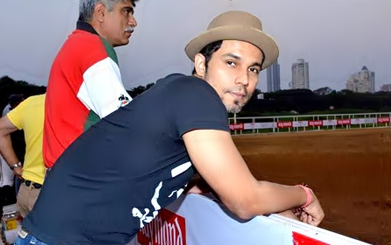
Hooda at the Raymond National and Junior National Equestrian Championship

"My taking to polo in a big way was only natural. Today, polo is not just restricted to the royalty and the Indian Army, many companies and firms to patronise the sport. [...] Even if you do not get the chance to play, there is every chance of being able to watch the sport as an observer—which is almost as good as playing."

— Randeep Hooda, in an interview with Deccan Herald

Hooda is the only Bollywood actor who regularly participates in professional equestrian sports, including polo and show jumping. He started competing at a professional level after the release of his film D. Hooda was coached by Colonel SS Ahalawat and Brigadier Bishnoi in show-jumping and dressage. He described riding as his "passion"; "My first stint with horses happened when I was in class eight at the Motilal Nehru School of Sports in Haryana, but thereafter I didn't ride horses for 17 years". He owned eight horses, but gave away two of them to new trainees. He keeps his horses at the Mahalaxmi Racecourse in Mumbai.

In December 2008, Hooda underwent surgery after suffering a severe ankle injury in a fall from his horse during a polo match in Mumbai. The following year, he won a silver medal at an open dressage event organised by the Equestrian Federation of India in Delhi. Hooda has also won medals at equestrian events in Mumbai and Delhi, where he participated with riders from the Indian Army. In 2014, Hooda won seven medals, including three gold and two silver and bronze medals respectively, at the National Equestrian Championship in dressage and show-jumping events. Additionally, he has won a silver medal each at the Delhi Horse Show, in 2009 and the Bombay Horse Show, in 2011.

=== Journalism ===
In 2009, Hooda was a guest contributor to "In The Script", a column published by Asian Correspondent. His article titled "Racism against Indians in Australia ..." discussed the violence against Indians in Australia controversy. Hooda wrote about his experience in Australia, where he was subjected to racial discrimination; he said, "My experiences were not in my mind incidents of racial discrimination but more a challenge of an individual assertion of mental and physical superiority". In conclusion, he wrote, "The point is to get tough inside out, play a sport apart from cricket, have heart and stand up in unity and say 'we'll not take shit'. All it needs is a few pioneers and I'm proud to say that I tried [and will continue to do so] and I hope a few others do that too." In 2011, Hooda began writing a blog for Hindustan Times.

=== Social activism ===
In September 2010, Hooda and Jackky Bhagnani appeared in a charity fashion show for Khushi, Kapil Dev's NGO to improve poor communities in India. The following year, Hooda raised public awareness of chronic hunger in India. He presented a video to the cast and crew of Jism 2, who shared it on their social media accounts. In December 2012, Hooda participated in an anti-suicide initiative with Imtiaz Ali, Rahul Bose, Mahesh Bhupati, and Nishikant Kamath. Hooda, who had failed Class 12, said, "Don't accept defeat. Fight back adversities. Failure is a myth. Every experience is a just fodder for the future. Suicide doesn't solve the problem, It ends you."

== Media image and personal life ==
Apart from his reputation as an intense actor, Hooda is considered one of India's most attractive celebrities. In 2010, he ranked 21st in The Times of India's annual list of the 50 most desirable men. In 2011, a global online survey conducted by Internet Movie Database (IMDb) ranked him seventh on its list of the "20 sexiest men in the world". Although he was surprised and grateful, Hooda said he is not influenced by such labels; "I want people to know me for my body of work, than just my body ... Being sexy can always just be an added advantage, not the be-all and end-all for an actor". During an interview with Mid-Day, he said during his early years in the industry, people saw him as an "explosive Jat boy" who had a calculated approach to his work. He said, "Now, I'm a bit more careful. I've changed the way I express myself".

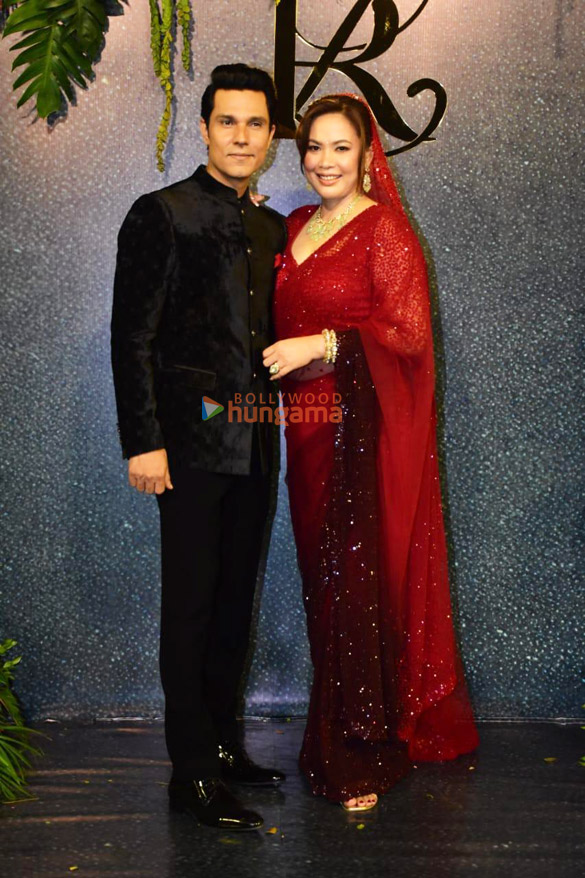
Hooda with wife Lin Laishram in 2023

Hooda lived in a hostel from a young age; he said, "I've always had a good time, it's something that gives me my spirit and fuels my spirit as well. Now, I want my parents to live with me, I want to enjoy their company more." He said he had a good relationship with his parents, who live in Faridabad, and that their openness to everything has helped him in life. He considers Naseeruddin Shah to be his "mentor, friend and confidant", saying, "He's an inspiration and somebody who has helped nurture me as an actor not necessarily my career but my craft. He's also the one who opened my eyes to the world of acting."

Hooda was in a relationship with former Miss Universe and actress Sushmita Sen from 2004 to 2006. He later said ending their relationship changed his career; "The break-up was the best thing that happened to me and I realised that I gave it too much time in my life. It freed my energy to do things for myself."

He met model and actor Lin Laishram at Naseeruddin Shah’s theatre group Motley, and fell in love. They started living together during the lockdown, and made their relationship Instagram official in 2022. Eventually, they got married on 29 November 2023 in a traditional Meitei ceremony in Imphal, Manipur. Their first child, a girl named Nyomica, was born on 10 March 2026.

Hooda owns a stray dog named Candy.

Born into a Hindu family, in recent years Hooda has identified as a Sikh.

== Filmography ==
=== Films ===
Key
†	Denotes films that have not yet been released

List of film credits
Year	Title	Role	Notes	Ref.
2001	Monsoon Wedding	Rahul Chadha	English film	
2005	D	Deshu		
2006	Darna Zaroori Hai	Ajay Doshi	Segment: "A Bride's Revenge"	
2007	Risk	Suryakant Satam		
2008	Ru Ba Ru	Nikhil "Nick" Singh		
2008	Rang Rasiya	Raja Ravi Varma		
2009	Mere Khwabon Mein Jo Aaye	Jai Hoods		
2009	Karma Aur Holi	Dev Kohli		
2009	Love Khichdi	Vir Pratap Singh		
2010	Once Upon a Time in Mumbaai	ACP Agnel Wilson / Narrator		
2011	Saheb Biwi Aur Gangster	Lalit "Babloo"		
2012	Jannat 2	ACP Pratap Raghuvanshi		
2012	Cocktail	Kunal Ahuja		
2012	Jism 2	Kabir Wilson		
2012	Heroine	Angad Paul		
2013	Murder 3	Vikram		
2013	Bombay Talkies	Dev		
2013	John Day	ACP Gautam		
2014	Highway	Mahabir Bhati		
2014	Kick	Himanshu Tyagi		
2014	Ungli	Abhay Kashyap		
2015	Beeba Boys	Jeet Johar	English-Punjabi film	
2015	Main Aur Charles	Charles Sobhraj		
2016	Laal Rang	Shankar Malik		
2016	Sarbjit	Sarabjit Singh		
2016	Do Lafzon Ki Kahani	Sooraj Singh Rathod		
2016	Sultan	Fateh Singh		
2018	Baaghi 2	Loha Singh Dhull		
2020	Love Aaj Kal	Raghvendra "Raghu" Singh / Raj		
2020	Extraction	Saju Rav	English film	
2021	Radhe	Rana		
2023	Sergeant	Nikhil Sharma		
2023	Operation Fryday	Ghulam		
2024	Tera Kya Hoga Lovely	Inspector Sombir Sangwan		
2024	Swatantrya Veer Savarkar	Vinayak Damodar Savarkar	Also director, writer and producer	
2025	Jaat	Ranatunga / Muthuvel Karikalan		
2026	Matchbox: The Movie	Mustafa	English film	
2026	Eetha			

=== Television ===
List of television credits
Year	Title	Role	Ref.
2022	CAT	Gurnam Singh / Gary	
2023-2026	Inspector Avinash	Inspector Avinash Mishra	

=== Music videos ===
List of music video credits
Year	Title	Singer	Ref.
2023	"Zohrajabeen"	B Praak	

== Awards and nominations ==
List of awards and nominations received by Randeep Hooda
Year	Award	Category	Film	Result	Ref.
2006	Zee Cine Awards	Best Debut Actor	Darna Zaroori Hai	Nominated	
2006	Bollywood Movie Awards	Best Debut Actor	Darna Zaroori Hai	Nominated	
2006	Annual Central European Bollywood Awards	Breakthrough Role (Actor)	Darna Zaroori Hai	Won	
2011	Annual Central European Bollywood Awards	Best Supporting Actor	Once Upon a Time in Mumbaai	Nominated	
2011	Lions Gold Awards	Favorite Supporting Actor	Once Upon a Time in Mumbaai	Won	
2011	Global Film Awards	Best Supporting Actor	Once Upon a Time in Mumbaai	Nominated	
2012	Apsara Film & Television Producers Guild Awards	Best Actor in a Supporting Role	Saheb, Biwi Aur Gangster	Nominated	
2012	International Indian Film Academy Awards	Best Actor in a Supporting Role	Saheb, Biwi Aur Gangster	Nominated	
2013	Stardust Awards	Best Actor	Jannat 2	Nominated	
2014	Stardust Awards	Best Actor	Highway	Won	
2014	BIG Star Entertainment Awards, India	Most Entertaining Actor In a Social - Drama	Highway	Nominated	
2015	Screen Awards	Best Actor	Highway	Nominated	
2015	Producers Guild Film Award for Best Actor in a Leading Role	Best Actor	Highway	Nominated	
2015	International Indian Film Academy Awards	Best Actor in a Supporting Role	Highway	Nominated	
2015	Apsara Film & Television Producers Guild Awards	Best Actor in a Supporting Role	Kick	Nominated	
2015	Arab Indo Bollywood Awards	Best Actor in a Supporting Role	Kick	Nominated	
2015	International Indian Film Academy Awards	Best Actor in a Supporting Role	Kick	Nominated	
2015	Filmfare Awards	Best Actor	Rang Rasiya	Nominated	
2015	Stardust Awards	Best Actor in a Negative Role	Main Aur Charles	Won	
2016	Screen Awards	Best Actor in a Negative Role	Main Aur Charles	Nominated	
2016	BIG Star Entertainment Awards, India	Most Entertaining Actor in a Drama	Sarbjit	Nominated	
2016	Jagran Film Festival	Best Actor	Sarbjit	Won	
2016	FOI Online Awards	Best Actor	Sarbjit	Won	
2017	News18 REEL Movie Award	Best Actor in a Supporting Role	Sarbjit	Won	
2017	Stardust Awards	Best Actor	Sarbjit	Nominated	
2021	Indian Film and Television Awards	Best Actor in a Supporting Role	Love Aaj Kal	Nominated	
2022	Indian Film and Television Awards	Best Actor in a Negative Role	Radhe	Nominated	
2023	News18 REEL Movie Award	Best Actor	CAT	Nominated	
2023	Hitlist OTT Awards	Best Actor	CAT	Nominated	
2023	Indian Television Academy Awards, India	Best Actor in an Original Film	Sergeant	Won	
2023	Lokmat Stylish Awards	Most Stylish Trendsetter - Male	--	Won	
2023	Indian Television Academy Awards, India	Best Actor - Drama (OTT)	Inspector Avinash	Nominated	
2024	International Iconic Awards	Best Actor in a Web Series	Inspector Avinash	Nominated	
2025	70th Filmfare Awards	Best Actor (Critic)	Swatantrya Veer Savarkar	Nominated	

== See also ==
- List of Indian film actors
