= List of Hindi films of 2003 =

A list of films produced by the Bollywood film industry based in Mumbai in 2003.

== Highest-grossing films ==
The top 10 highest-grossing films worldwide in 2003.

Rank No.	Title	Production company	Worldwide gross
1	Kal Ho Naa Ho	Dharma Productions	₹86.09 crore (US$18.48 million)
2	Koi... Mil Gaya	Filmkraft Productions Pvt. Ltd	₹82.32 crore (US$17.67 million)
3	The Hero: Love Story of a Spy	Time Magnetics (India) Pvt. Ltd	₹45.13 crore (US$9.69 million)
4	Chalte Chalte	Dreamz Unlimited; UTV Motion Pictures	₹43.29 crore (US$9.29 million)
5	Baghban	B. R. Films	₹43.11 crore (US$9.25 million)
6	Munna Bhai M.B.B.S.	Vinod Chopra Productions; Entertainment One	₹36.29 crore (US$7.79 million)
7	Main Prem Ki Diwani Hoon	Rajshri Productions	₹39.31 crore (US$8.44 million)
8	LOC: Kargil	J. P. Films	₹31.67 crore (US$6.8 million)
9	Andaaz	Shree Krishna International	₹28.81 crore (US$6.18 million)
10	Qayamat: City Under Threat	Bawaja Movies	₹28.52 crore (US$6.12 million)

== List of released films ==
Title	Director	Cast	Genre
2 October	Sunil Tiwari	Ashutosh Rana, Sharat Saxena, Saadhika Randhawa, Mukesh Tiwari	Action, thriller
3 Deewarein	Nagesh Kukunoor	Naseeruddin Shah, Jackie Shroff, Juhi Chawla	Drama
88 Antop Hill	Kushan Nandy	Rahul Dev, Shweta Menon, Harsh Khurana, Atul Kulkarni	Thriller
Aaj Ka Andha Kanoon	Amit Chandra Sahay	Sudesh Berry	Action, drama
Aanch	Rajesh Kumar Singh	Nana Patekar, Paresh Rawal	Romance, drama
Aapko Pehle Bhi Kahin Dekha Hai	Anubhav Sinha	Priyanshu Chatterjee, Sakshi Shivanand, Manoj Pahwa, Om Puri, Farida Jalal	Romance
Andaaz	Suneel Darshan	Akshay Kumar, Priyanka Chopra, Aman Verma, Lara Dutta	Romance
Armaan	Honey Irani	Amitabh Bachchan, Anil Kapoor, Preity Zinta, Gracy Singh, Randhir Kapoor, Aamir Bashir	Drama, family
Baaz: A Bird in Danger	Tinu Verma	Sunil Shetty, Karisma Kapoor, Dino Morea, Preeti Jhangiani, Jackie Shroff	Thriller
Baghban	Ravi Chopra	Amitabh Bachchan, Hema Malini, Sharat Saxena, Aman Verma, Lillete Dubey, Samir Soni, Rimi Sen, Suman Ranganathan, Divya Dutta, Salman Khan, Paresh Rawal, Mahima Chaudhry	Drama, family
Bas Yun Hi	Raja Menon	Nandita Das, Purab Kohli, Sameer Malhotra, Sandhya Shetty	Drama
Basti	Basharat Khan	Samir Soni, Faisal Khan	Action
Bhoot	Ram Gopal Varma	Urmila Matondkar, Ajay Devgn, Rekha, Nana Patekar, Fardeen Khan	Horror
Boom	Kaizad Gustad	Amitabh Bachchan, Jackie Shroff, Gulshan Grover, Katrina Kaif, Madhu Sapre, Padma Lakshmi	Black comedy thriller
Calcutta Mail	Sudhir Mishra	Anil Kapoor, Rani Mukerji, Manisha Koirala	Drama
Chalte Chalte	Aziz Mirza	Shah Rukh Khan, Rani Mukerji, Jas Arora, Lillete Dubey, Satish Shah, Rajeev Verma	Drama, romance, comedy, musical
Chori Chori	Milan Luthria	Ajay Devgn, Rani Mukerji, Sonali Bendre	Romance
Chupke Se	Shona Urvashi	Zulfi Syed, Masumeh Makhija	Romance, comedy
Chura Liyaa Hai Tumne	Sangeeth Sivan	Zayed Khan, Esha Deol	Action, drama, romance, thriller
Darna Mana Hai	Prawaal Raman	Saif Ali Khan, Shilpa Shetty, Sameera Reddy, Vivek Oberoi, Sohail Khan, Aftab Shivdasani, Antara Mali, Nana Patekar, Rajpal Yadav, Isha Koppikar, Sanjay Kapoor	Horror, thriller
Dhoop	Ashwini Chaudhary	Murli Sharma, Gul Panag, Om Puri, Revathi, Sanjay Suri	War drama
Dhund	Shyam Ramsay	Amar Upadhyay, Aditi Gowitrikar, Irrfan Khan, Gulshan Grover, Apoorva Agnihotri	Horror
Dil Ka Rishta	Naresh Malhotra	Arjun Rampal, Aishwarya Rai, Priyanshu Chatterjee, Isha Koppikar, Raakhee, Paresh Rawal	Drama, romance
Dil Pardesi Ho Gayaa	Saawan Kumar Tak	Kapil Jhaveri, Ashutosh Rana, Saloni Aswani, Amrish Puri	Romance
Dum	Eeshwar Nivas	Vivek Oberoi, Diya Mirza, Vivek Shauq, Atul Kulkarni	Action, drama, romance
Ek Alag Mausam	K. P. Sasi	Nandita Das, Anupam Kher	
Ek Aur Ek Gyarah	David Dhawan	Sanjay Dutt, Govinda, Amrita Arora, Gulshan Grover, Jackie Shroff, Ashish Vidyarthi	Comedy
Ek Din 24 Ghante	Anant Balani	Rahul Bose, Nandita Das, Kabir Sadanand, Prithvi Zutshi	Thriller
Escape from Taliban	Ujjal Chattopadhyaya	Manisha Koirala	Drama
Final Solution	Rakesh Sharma		Documentary
Footpath	Vikram Bhatt	Aftab Shivdasani, Bipasha Basu, Emraan Hashmi, Rahul Dev, Irrfan Khan	Drama
Fun2shh... Dudes in the 10th Century	Imtiaz Punjabi	Gulshan Grover, Paresh Rawal, Farida Jalal	Fantasy, comedy
Gangaajal	Prakash Jha	Ajay Devgn, Gracy Singh, Ayub Khan	Drama, social
Haasil	Tigmanshu Dhulia	Jimmy Sheirgill, Irrfan Khan, Ashutosh Rana, Hrishita Bhatt, Sudhir Pandey	Drama
Hawa	Guddu Dhanoa	Tabu, Shahbaz Khan	Horror
Hawayein	Ammtoje Mann	Babbu Mann, Ammotje Mann	Docudrama
The Hero: Love Story of a Spy	Anil Sharma	Sunny Deol, Preity Zinta, Priyanka Chopra	Drama, action, thriller
Humein Tumse Pyar Ho Gaya Chupke Chupke	Pramod Mandloi	Siddharth Dhawan, Shraddha Sharma, Kiran Kumar, Raza Murad, Shakti Kapoor, Mehmood Junior	Romance, drama
Hungama	Priyadarshan	Akshaye Khanna, Rimi Sen, Aftab Shivdasani, Rajpal Yadav, Paresh Rawal	Comedy
Indian Babu	Lawrence D'Souza	Jaz Pandher, Gurleen Chopra, Johnny Lever	Drama
Inteha	Vikram Bhatt	Ashmit Patel, Vidya Malvade, Anup Soni, Nauheed Cyrusi	Drama, thriller
Ishq Vishk	Ken Ghosh	Shahid Kapoor, Amrita Rao, Vishal Malhotra, Satish Shah, Yash Tonk, Neelima Azeem	Romance
Jaal: The Trap	Guddu Dhanoa	Sunny Deol, Tabu, Reema Sen	Action, romance
Jajantaram Mamantaram	Soumitra Ranade	Javed Jaffrey	Fantasy
Janasheen	Feroz Khan	Fardeen Khan, Celina Jaitley, Feroz Khan	Thriller
Jhankaar Beats	Sujoy Ghosh	Juhi Chawla, Rahul Bose, Rinke Khanna, Kurush Deboo, Sanjay Suri, Riya Sen, Archana Puran Singh, Dinyar Contractor	Drama, musical
Jism	Anurag Basu	Bipasha Basu, John Abraham, Gulshan Grover	Drama, romance, thriller
Jodi Kya Banayi Wah Wah Ramji	Raman Kumar	Amar Upadhyay, Reema Sen	Drama
Joggers Park	Anant Balani	Victor Banerjee, Perizaad Zorabian, Hiten Tejwani	Drama
Kagaar: Life on the Edge	N. Chandra	Om Puri, Nandita Das, Amitabh Dayal	
Kahan Ho Tum	Vijay Kumar	Sharman Joshi, Samir Soni, Sonu Sood, Ishitta Arun	Thriller
Kaise Kahoon Ke... Pyaar Hai		Sunny Deol	
Kal Ho Naa Ho	Nikhil Advani	Jaya Bachchan, Shah Rukh Khan, Saif Ali Khan, Preity Zinta, Uday Chopra	Drama, romance, comedy, family, musical, social
Kash Aap Hamare Hote	Ravindra Peepat	Juhi Babbar, Sonu Nigam	Romance
Khanjar: The Knife	Chander Sharma	Sunil Shetty, Tabu	Action
Khel – No Ordinary Game	Yusuf Khan	Sunil Shetty, Sunny Deol, Ajay Jadeja, Celina Jaitley	Thriller
Khushi	S. J. Suryah	Fardeen Khan, Kareena Kapoor, Anup Soni, Amrish Puri, Sharat Saxena	Romance
Khwahish	Govind Menon	Mallika Sherawat, Himanshu Malik	Drama
Koi... Mil Gaya	Rakesh Roshan	Rekha, Hrithik Roshan, Preity Zinta	Romance, fantasy, musical
Kucch To Hai	Anurag Basu	Tusshar Kapoor, Esha Deol, Natassha, Yash Tonk, Rishi Kapoor, Jeetendra, Moonmoon Sen, Johnny Lever	Thriller
Kuch Naa Kaho	Rohan Sippy	Abhishek Bachchan, Aishwarya Rai, Arbaaz Khan	Drama, romance, musical
LOC: Kargil	J. P. Dutta	Ajay Devgn, Sanjay Dutt, Suniel Shetty, Saif Ali Khan, Abhishek Bachchan, Akshaye Khanna, Kareena Kapoor, Rani Mukerji, Sanjay Kapoor, Manoj Bajpai, Isha Koppikar, Mahima Chaudhry, Karan Nath, Esha Deol, Raveena Tandon	War, drama, historical
Love at Times Square		Dev Anand, Moon Moon Sen, Heenee Kaushik	Drama
Main Madhuri Dixit Banna Chahti Hoon	Chandan Arora	Antara Mali, Rajpal Yadav	Comedy
Main Prem Ki Diwani Hoon	Sooraj R. Barjatya	Hrithik Roshan, Kareena Kapoor, Johnny Lever, Abhishek Bachchan	Romance, drama, comedy
Market	Jay Prakash	Manisha Koirala	Crime drama
Mudda: The Issue	Saurabh Shukla	Arya Babbar, Prashant Narayanan	Drama
Mumbai Matinee	Anant Balani	Rahul Bose, Perizaad Zorabian, Anusha Dhandekar, Vijay Raaz, Saurabh Shukla	Romance comedy
Mumbai Se Aaya Mera Dost	Apoorva Agnihotri	Abhishek Bachchan, Lara Dutta	Drama
Munna Bhai M.B.B.S.	Rajkumar Hirani	Sanjay Dutt, Arshad Warsi, Gracy Singh, Jimmy Sheirgill, Boman Irani, Sunil Dutt	Comedy, social, musical
Nayee Padosan	B. H. Tharun Kumar	Mahek Chahal, Vikas Kalantri, Anuj Sawhney	Comedy
Om	Ashok Honda	Attin Bhalla, Sandali Sinha, Pankaj Dheer, Sharat Saxena	Action
Oops!	Deepak Tijori	Kiran Janjani, Vikas Sethi, Mink Brar, Mita Vashisht	Erotic comedy
Out of Control	Apurva Asrani, Ramanjit Juneja	Ritesh Deshmukh, Hrishita Bhatt, Brande Roderick, Amrish Puri	Comedy, romance
Paap	Pooja Bhatt	John Abraham, Udita Goswami, Gulshan Grover	Thriller, crime
Parwana	Deepak Bahry	Ajay Devgn, Amisha Patel, Pooja Batra	Action, drama, thriller
Patth		Milind Gunaji, Sharad Kapoor, Nirmal Pandey, Payal Rohatgi, Hyder Kazmi	
Pinjar	Chandrakant Dwivedi	Urmila Matondkar, Manoj Bajpai, Sanjay Suri, Priyanshu Chatterjee, Isha Koppikar	Drama, social
The Pink Mirror	Sridhar Rangayan		Social drama
Praan Jaye Par Shaan Na Jaye	Sanjay Manjrekar	Aman Verma, Rinke Khanna, Vivek Shauq, Raveena Tandon, Namrata Shirodkar, Dia Mirza	Comedy
Qayamat: City Under Threat	Harry Baweja	Ajay Devgn, Sunil Shetty, Sanjay Kapoor, Neha Dhupia, Arbaaz Khan, Isha Koppikar, Riya Sen, Aashish Chaudhary, Chunky Pandey	Thriller
Raghu Romeo	Rajat Kapoor	Vijay Raaz, Sadiya Siddiqui	Drama
Raja Bhaiya	Raman Kumar	Govinda, Aarti Chhabria	Comedy
Right Here, Right Now	Anand Gandhi		Parallel short
Rules: Pyaar Ka Superhit Formula	Parvati Balagopalan	Milind Soman	Romance, comedy
Saaya	Anurag Basu	John Abraham, Tara Sharma, Mahima Chaudhry	Drama
Samay: When Time Strikes	Robby Grewal	Sushmita Sen, Jackie Shroff, Sushant Singh	Thriller
Satta	Madhur Bhandarkar	Raveena Tandon	Drama, social
Sssshhh...	Pawan S. Kaul	Karan Nath, Dino Morea, Tanishaa Mukerji	Thriller
Stumped	Gaurav Pandey		Sports drama
Supari		Uday Chopra, Namrata Shirodkar	
Tada	Sisir. P. Mishra	Monica Bedi, Sharad Kapoor	
Talaash: The Hunt Begins...	Suneel Darshan	Akshay Kumar, Kareena Kapoor	Thriller
Tehzeeb	Khalid Mohamed	Urmila Matondkar, Shabana Azmi, Arjun Rampal, Rishi Kapoor, Diya Mirza, Namrata Shirodkar	Drama
Tere Naam	Satish Kaushik	Salman Khan, Bhoomika Chawla, Sarfaraz Khan	Drama, romance
The Perfect Husband	Priya Singh Paul	Parvin Dabas, Neha Dubey, Rajeshwari Sachdev	Drama
Tujhe Meri Kasam	K. Vijaya Bhaskar	Riteish Deshmukh, Genelia D'Souza	Romance
Tumse Milke Wrong Number	Jignesh M. Vaishav	Tinnu Anand	Thriller
Waisa Bhi Hota Hai Part II	Shashanka Ghosh	Arshad Warsi, Sandhya Mridul, Prashant Narayanan	Action drama
Xcuse Me	N. Chandra	Sahil Khan, Sharman Joshi, Payal Rohatgi	Comedy
Yeh Dil	Teja	Tusshar Kapoor, Natassha, Akhilendra Mishra, Sharat Saxena	Romance, drama
Zameen	Rohit Shetty	Ajay Devgn, Abhishek Bachchan, Bipasha Basu	Thriller
Zinda Dil	N/A	Abbas, Ashima Bhalla, Om Puri, Sharad Kapoor, Gulshan Grover, Johnny Lever	Romance

== See also ==
- List of Hindi films of 2004
- List of Hindi films of 2002
- Freaky Chakra – 2003 Indian English-language film
