= Reza Shariffi =

Costume designer (born 1967)

- Born: April 16, 1967
- Other names: Agha Reza
- Occupation: Costume Designer
- Awards: National Film Award for Best Costume Design for Devdas; Star Guild Award for Best Costume Design (Nomination) for Tanu Weds Manu; Indian Telly Jury Award for Best Costumes for a TV Program for Kahin Na Kahin Koi Hai
- Website: www.reza.co.in

Reza Shariffi (born April 16, 1967) is a costume designer from India. He has designed for many leading actresses in Bollywood.

He was nominated as ‘best costume designer’ for Kangana Ranaut’s costumes in the movie Tanu Weds Manu. He has designed costumes for many actors in the Indian film industry, both Hindi and regional. He has won awards including an IIFA and Zee Cine Award for his designs in Devdas. His designs in Main Madhuri Dixit Banna Chahti Hoon were nominated for an award. He is known for designing the costumes of stars including Madhuri Dixit, Kareena Kapoor, Priyanka Chopra, Kangana Ranaut, Malaika Arora Khan, Sushmita Sen, Jacqueline Fernandez, Shraddha Kapoor, Huma Qureshi, Padma Priya, Hansika Motwani and many others.

His work ranges from the opulent and glamorous Devdas to the realistic and unglamorous Shabri. He has over 70 films to his credit.

Shariffi has also designed for dance reality shows like Nach Baliye (four seasons), Jhalak Dikhhla Jaa (seasons 3, 4 and 5), and many others.

The ace designer found place in the 9th Annual India Leadership Conclave 2018 award as six final nominees in the category of "Indian Affairs Most Promising & Innovative Fashion Designer of the Year 2018".

== Latest designs ==
He designed costumes for Kangana Ranaut in her first ever double role as Tanuja Trivedi and Kusum aka Datto in Tanu Weds Manu Returns. Shariffi created two very distinct looks for the characters.

== Awards ==
=== Won ===
- 2003 - International Indian Film Academy Award for Best Costume - Devdas
- 2003 - National Film Award Silver Lotus for Best Costume Design - Devdas
- 2003 - Zee Cine Award Zee Cine Award for Costume Design for Devdas
- Indian Telly Jury Award for Best Costumes for a TV Program for Kahin Na Kahin Koi Hai
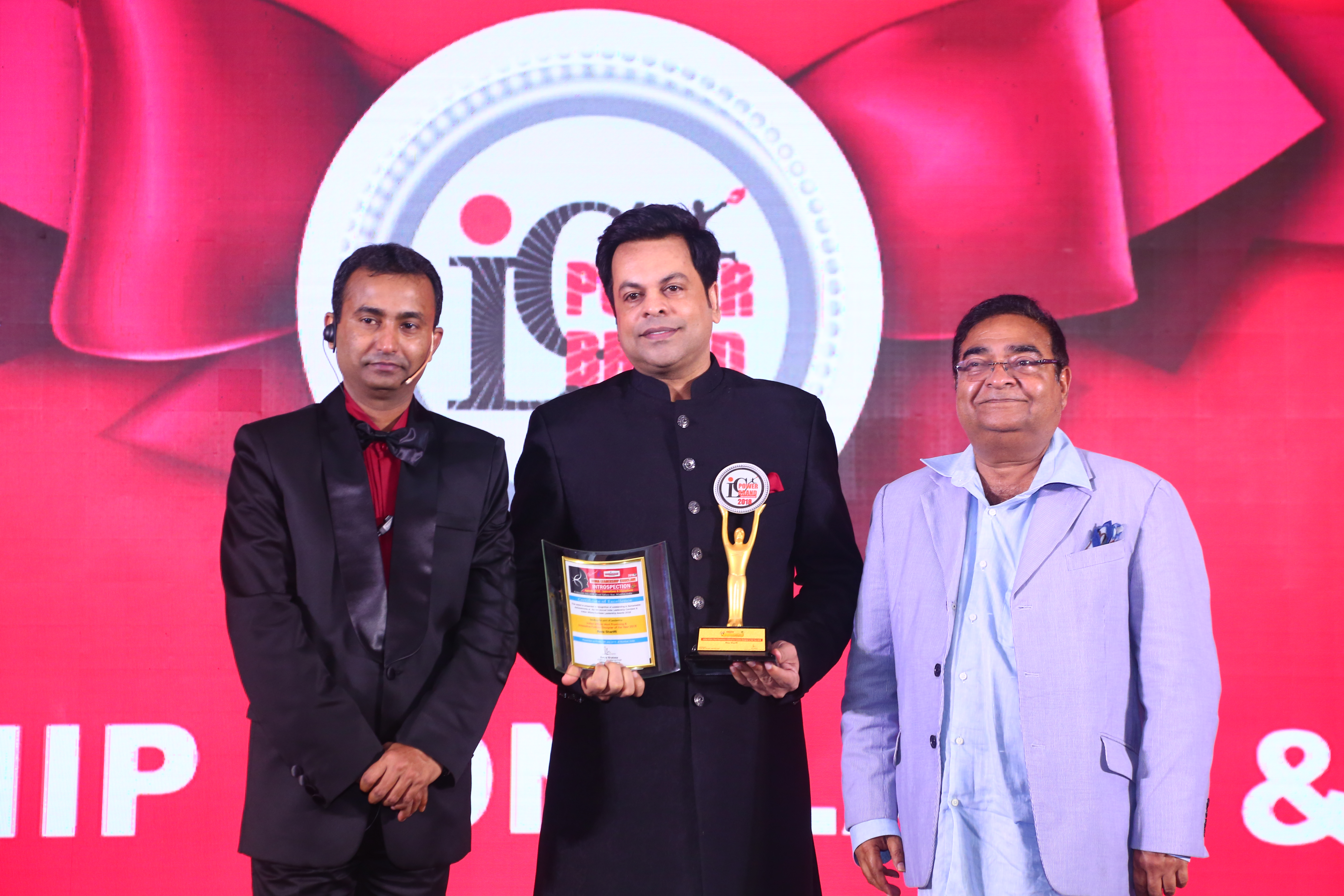
- Reza awarded as "Indian Affairs Most Promising & Innovative Fashion Designer of the Year 2018"
  2018 - Indian Affairs Most Promising & Innovative Fashion Designer of the Year 2018 at India Leadership Conclave 2018.

=== Nominations ===
- 2004 Zee Cine Award for Best Costume Design for Main Madhuri Dixit Banna Chahti Hoon
- 2012 Apsara Award Best Costume Design for Tanu Weds Manu

== Costume design filmography ==
Year	Film	Actors designed for
1995	Hum Sab Chor Hain	Ritu Shivpuri
1996	Rajkumar	Madhuri Dixit
1996	Hindustani	Kamal Hasan
1997	Aar Ya Paar	Ritu Shivpuri and Deepa Sahi
1997	Hameshaa	Saif Ali Khan
1997	Mohabbat	Madhuri Dixit
1998	Wajood	Madhuri Dixit
2000	Hey Ram	Kamal Hasan, Shah Rukh Khan
2000	Bagunnara (Telugu)	Priya Gill
2000	Gaja Gamini	Madhuri Dixit, Shabana Azmi, Shilpa Shirodkar
2000	Raju Chacha	kids
2001	Bas Itna Sa Khwaab Hai	Rani Mukherjee
2001	Rehnaa Hai Terre Dil Mein	Dia Mirza
2001	Indian	Malaika Arora
2001	Deewaanapan	Dia Mirza
2001	Aalavandhan	Kamal Hasan and Raveena Tandon
2002	Panchathantiram	Kamal Hasan
2002	Pammal K. Sambandam	Kamal Hasan
2002	Filhaal...	Palash Sen and other characters
2002	Tumko Na Bhool Paayenge	Dia Mirza
2002	Hum Tumhare Hain Sanam	Madhuri Dixit
2002	Devdas	Madhuri Dixit, Milind Gunaji, Vijendra Ghatge and other male characters
2002	Karz: The Burden of Truth	Shilpa Shetty
2002	Saathiya	Shamita Shetty
2003	Pilisthe Palukutha (Telugu)	Shamita Shetty
2003	Darna Mana Hai	Shilpa Shetty, Sameera Reddy
2003	Main Madhuri Dixit Banna Chahti Hoon	Antara Mali
2003	Samay: When Time Strikes	Sushmita Sen
2004	Plan	Priyanka Chopra, Sameera Reddy, Ria Sen
2004	Paisa Vasool	Sushmita Sen
2004	Kismat	Priyanka Chopra
2004	Surya	Rakhi Sawant
2004	Hum Tum	Saif Ali Khan, Ishaa Koppikar, Kiron Kher
2004	Garv: Pride and Honour	Shilpa Shetty
2004	Gayab	Antara Mali
2004	Rakht	Neha Dhupia
2004	Vaastu Shastra	Sushmita Sen
2004	Naach	Antara Mali
2005	Zameer	Mahima Chaudhry
2005	Mumbai Xpress	Kamal Hasan
2005	Khamoshh... Khauff Ki Raat	Shilpa Shetty
2005	Kyaa Kool Hai Hum	Isha Koppikar, Neha Dhupia
2005	Yakeen	Priyanka Chopra
2005	Fareb	Shilpa Shetty
2005	I Did Not Kill Gandhi	Urmila Matondkar
2005	Mr Ya Miss	Antara Mali
2005	Auto Shankar (Kannada)	Shilpa Shetty
2006	Banaras	Urmila Matondkar
2006	Alag: He Is Different.... He Is Alone...	Sunny, Dia Mirza
2007	Big Brother	Priyanka Chopra
2007	Saawariya	Ranbir Kapoor
2007	Dus Kahaniyaan	Amrita Singh, Minishaa Lambaa and others
2010	Seeta Ramula Kalyanam (Telugu)	Hansika Motwani
2010	Right Yaaa Wrong	Isha Koppikar
2010	Raajneeti	Katrina Kaif
2010	Hello Darling	Isha Koppikar
2011	Tanu Weds Manu	Kangana Ranaut
2011	Double Dhamaal	Kangana Ranaut
2011	Kandireega (Telugu)	Aksa Pardesani
2011	Shabri	Isha Koppikar
2011	Velayudham (Tamil)	Hansika Motwani
2011	Loot	Rakhi Sawant
2012	Oru Kal Oru Kannadi (Tamil)	Hansika Motwani
2013	Rajjo	Kangana Ranaut
2015	Tanu Weds Manu Returns	Kangana Ranaut
