= Seema Shinde =

Indian Actress

- Born: Mumbai, India
- Occupation: Actress
- Years active: 1988-2004
- Notable work: Justice Chowdhary; Main Madhuri Dixit Banna Chahti Hoon; Aanch; Marathi Play Turtur; National Awarded documentary film Kamli
- Spouse: Sandeep Patil
- Children: Sarah Patil, Simmoney Patil
- Relatives: Sayaji Shinde; Shilpa Shinde
- Website: seemashinde.com india2usamedia.com

Seema Shinde is an Indian actress who predominantly works in Hindi and Marathi cinema and television. She is best known for her role in the television series Captain Vyom. She has also starred in films, including Justice Chowdhary, Main Madhuri Dixit Banna Chahti Hoon, and Aanch. Seema married Sandeep Patil, a USA-based Maharastrian Hotelier who owns resorts and condos in Maine. She is the founder and Publisher of India2Usa Media E-Magazine.

== Early life and education ==
Seema Shinde was born and brought up in Mumbai, India. She completed her schooling at Sir Elly Kadoorie High School Mumbai. She later attended Ruparel College.

== Television ==
Year	Serial Name	Role	Channel
1988-1989	Durga Zali Gauri	Girl	DD1
1996	Alagooj	Sayaji Shinde's Daughter	DD1
1996-1997	Ashiyana	Vrajesh Hirjee's Girlfriend	DD1
1996-1997	Tu Tu Main Main	Neighbor	Star Plus
1997-98	Mohandas B.A.L.L.B.	Mohan's fellow officer	Zee TV
1997-1998	Hi Zindgi Bye Zindagi	Jaspal Bhatti's Bhabhi	Zee Tv
1998	Captain Vyom		DD National
1999-2000	Bandini	Daughter In-Law	Zee Marathi
2000	Astitva...Ek Prem Kahani	Dr. Simran Mathur's assistant	Zee TV
2001	Aankhen (TV series)	Raju Kher's daughter	DD National
2002	Jagavegali	Suhas Joshi's Daughter In-Law	Zee Marathi

== Filmography ==
Year	Film	Role	Language
2000	Justice Chowdhary	Ravi Kishan Wife	Hindi
2000	kulswami Tulja Bhawani	Lead Actress	Hindi & Marathi
2003	Aanch	Vidya's cousin	Hindi & Awadhi
2003	Main Madhuri Dixit Banna Chahti Hoon	Antara Mali's Friend	Hindi

== Theater ==
Year	Play's Name	Role	Language
1994	Natarang	Village Girl	Marathi
1994	Padmashree Dhundiraj	Padmashree's Daughter	Marathi
1994	Bhaubandki	Salkaya	Marathi
1994	Savalya		Marathi
1995	Tur Tur	Rani / Cleaner Boy	Marathi
1995	Tu Teech Ti	Kidnapped Girl	Marathi
1996	Sarvasvi Tujhi	Mahesh Manjrekar's Wife	Marathi
