= Rasika Joshi =

Indian actress (1972–2011)

- Rasika Joshi in 2009
- Born: 12 September 1972; Mumbai, Maharashtra, India
- Died: 7 July 2011 (aged 38); Mumbai, Maharashtra, India

Rasika Joshi (12 September 1972 – 7 July 2011) was an Indian actress. A Marathi theatre, Indian television and film actress, she was known for Maharashtrian roleplays in Hindi films.

== Career ==
She began her career with a Marathi play by Lata Narvekar called Uncha Mazha Zoka, starring Avinash Masurekar and Smita Talvalkar. Her last movie was Ram Gopal Verma's movie Not a Love Story. She worked as writer, director and actor in the play White Lily And Night Rider.

== Filmography ==
=== Hindi ===
She was first noticed and applauded in Ek Hasina Thi. She became quite a favourite of directors RGV and Priyadarshan and frequently appeared in their works. Some of her Hindi movies include:

Key
| † | Denotes films that have not yet been released |

| Year | Title | Role(s) | Notes |
|---|---|---|---|
| 2003 | Darna Mana Hai | | |
| 2004 | Ek Hasina Thi | Gomati | |
| 2004 | Gayab | Shanti Devi | |
| 2004 | Vaastu Shastra | Rukma | |
| 2006 | Malamaal Weekly | Mary | |
| 2006 | Darna Zaroori Hai | murdered woman's mother-in-law | |
| 2006 | Bhoot Unkle | Mami | |
| 2007 | Darling | Mrs. Shah Rukh Khan | |
| 2007 | Dhol | Landlady Brinda J. Bose | |
| 2007 | Johnny Gaddaar | Shiva's mother | |
| 2007 | Bhool Bhulaiyaa | Janki Batukshankar Upadhyay (née Chaturvedi) | |
| 2008 | De Taali | Mrs. Moolchand Nahata | |
| 2009 | Billu | Principal Gahalot | |
| 2011 | Not a Love Story | Ashish's mother | posthumous release |

==== Television ====
She became a household name with the Marathi serials Prapanch, Ghadlay Bighadlay, Bua Alaa and Yeh Duniya Hai Rangeen (1999). Her performance as Tarulata in Bandini was much appreciated.

=== Marathi ===
Rasika Joshi was a talented actress who worked in many films, theatre as well as television serials. Zabardast and Khabardaar are some of her notable works. T.V. shows like Ghadlay Bighadlay and Prapanch made her popular. She has also authored the Marathi movie Yanda Kartavya Aahe. Her self written, directed, essayed play, White Lily & Night Rider along with Milind Phatak won many awards, praises as well as accolades.

== Death ==
She died from leukaemia on 7 July 2011 in a nursing home in Mumbai, aged 38, and was survived by her husband Girish Joshi and family.
