= Jagdish Mali =

Indian fashion photographer

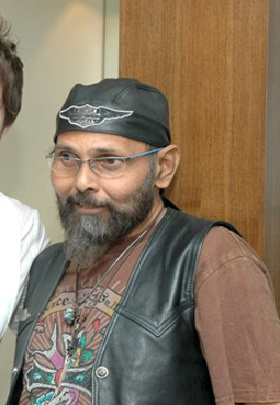
- Jagdish Mali at the 1st Bharat and Dorris makeup and hair style awards ceremony in 2009
- Born: 18 January 1954
- Died: 13 May 2013 (aged 59); Mumbai, Maharashtra, India
- Occupation: Photographer
- Children: Antara Mali

Jagdish Mali (18 January 1954 – 13 May 2013) was an Indian fashion and film photographer. He was the father of Bollywood actress Antara Mali. In his career he photographed celebrities like Rekha, Anupam Kher, Irrfan Khan, Manisha Koirala, and Shabana Azmi.

== Early life ==
Mali was born on 18 January 1954. He was not interested in school and studies and had dreamt since childhood of becoming a professional photographer. He was brought up in a middle-class family living in Bandra East and his father was an artist.

== Career ==
Mali worked for the cine magazine Cine Blitz in the 1980s. During this period he photographed actress Rekha for a span of about 10 years. His pictures of the actress are considered the best and have been selected to feature on the cover of the magazine. His other notable shots include that of actor Aamir Khan for his film Ghulam (1998) where Khan is seen in a black and white photograph packing a punch. Actress and social activist Kavita Radheshyam credits her career's launch to Mali.

Mali's work has been compared and appreciated with his peers like Gautam Rajadhyaksha and Ashok Salian. He had worked with various celebrities like Anupam Kher, Shabana Azmi, Nina Gupta, Manoj Bajpai. He also created portfolios of actors like Luv Sinha after his father Shatrughan Sinha insisted.

== Health and Death ==
In January 2013, Mali was reportedly found semi-nude wandering in the Mumbai suburban areas of Andheri. Model-actress Mink Brar and actor Salman Khan helped him. Khan, who runs an NGO named Being Human, blamed Mali's daughter for his condition. But Mali's daughter and his friends reportedly denied it and planned to take legal actions on Brar for giving wrong information to press, claiming it to be her publicity stunt. Mali had diabetes and needed regular insulin injections.

Mali died on 13 May 2013 at Nanavati hospital in Mumbai at the age of 59. The medical superintendent of the hospital reported the reason of his death to be multiple organ failure. He was suffering from liver cirrhosis for 15 years and had diabetes and high blood pressure. He was admitted on 1 May for a hip fracture.

His funeral took place at the Shivaji Park Crematorium.
