= The Bong Connection =

2006 Indian Bengali film

- Directed by: Anjan Dutt
- Produced by: Joy Ganguly
- Starring: Raima Sen; Shayan Munshi; Parambrata
- Music by: Neel Dutta
- Distributed by: Moviex Entertainment
- Release date: 2006
- Running time: 131 minutes
- Country: India
- Languages: Bengali; English

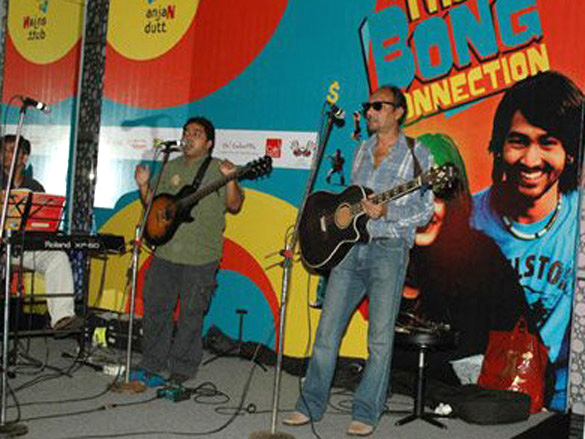
Anjan Dutt and Neel Dutt in premiere function of film

The Bong Connection is a 2006 Bengali-English language Indian film starring Raima Sen, Shayan Munshi and Parambrata Chatterjee and directed by Anjan Dutt. The movie, which is based on the lives of Bengalis in the U.S. and Kolkata, was screened at the Museum of Modern Art in New York City in 2005.

== Plot ==
The story revolves around two young men, Apu and Andy. Apu is leaving for the U.S. He promises his girlfriend, Sheela that he will come back soon and take her to the U.S.

Andy, a second-generation Bengali born and brought up in New York City, has dreams of becoming a musician and working in films. He comes to Kolkata to pursue his passion and stays at the house of his paternal uncle and grandfather. In Kolkata he meets Sheela, befriends her and falls in love with her.

Meanwhile, Apu, arrives in the U.S. and struggles to find his way in an alien nation. In the process he befriends Rita whose parents want to get her married to Apu. The rest of the movie revolves around the socio-comic adventures of Apu and Andy as they struggle to find their calling in life.

The movie featured an appearance by Kolkata alt-rock band Cassini's Division.

== Cast ==
- Shayan Munshi as Andy
- Parambrata Chatterjee as Apu
- Raima Sen as Sheela
- Peeya Rai Chowdhary as Rita
- Soumitra Chatterjee
- Victor Banerjee
- Mamata Shankar
- Biswajit Chakraborty
- Avijit Dutt
- Saswata Chatterjee
- Samrat Chakrabarti
- Shauvik Kundagrami
- Mir Afsar Ali
- June Malia

== Reception ==
Khalid Mohamed of Hindustan Times gave the film two out of five stars, writing, "Quite a guzzle puzzle, this". Rajeev Masand gave it the same rating and concluded, "it’s not entirely unwatchable, but it’s not a film you’re going to remember even five minutes after you’ve left the cinema." The Times of India, however, was highly positive of the film, writing, "It’s a delightful canvas of introspective comment which captures the psyche of the young Bengalis, even as it brings forth stirring performances by all the characters."
