= Shayan Munshi =

Indian actor

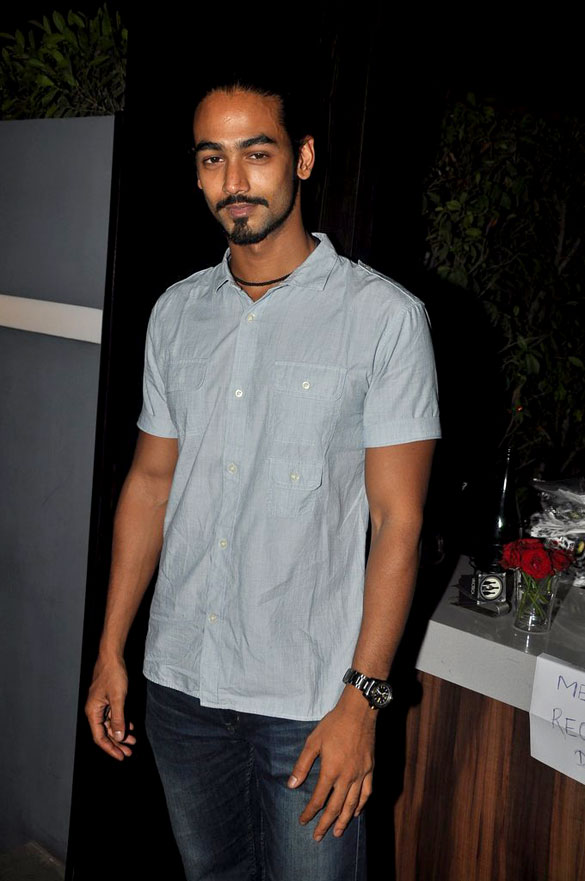
- Born: Kolkata, West Bengal, India
- Occupations: Model, Actor
- Years active: 2003–2017
- Spouse: Peeya Rai Chowdhary (m. 2006–2010)

Shayan Munshi is an Indian actor and model. He made his debut in the 2003 Bollywood film Jhankaar Beats and has performed in award-winning films such as The Bong Connection and Carnival. Shayan has hosted Television series like Cook Na Kaho, High Tension, and worked with brands like L'Oreal, Levi's, Samsung and Bacardi.

He was a key witness in the murder trial of Jessica Lal. He is facing perjury charges as a result.

== Filmography ==
=== Film ===
Films	Year	Role	Language	Notes
Chef	2017	Prateek	Hindi	
Cross Connection 2	2015		Bengali	
Unfreedom	2014	Anand	English	
Mere Dost Picture Abhi Baki Hai	2012	Romantic Hero	Hindi	
Mausam	2011	Yasin	Hindi	
Banshiwala	2010	Mridul	Bengali	
Ekti Tarar Khonje	2010	Abhisheikh	Bengali	
Morning Walk	2009	Ajay	Hindi	
The Bong Connection	2006	Andy Sen	Bengali	
Ahista Ahista	2006	Dheeraj Ansaria	Hindi	
Home Delivery : Aapko...Ghar Tak	2005	Corporate Man 1	Hindi	
My Brother...Nikhil	2005	Kelly Menzes	Hindi	
Power 18 Non Stop Dance Remix	2004	Dancer	Hindi	Album Song / Special Appearance in Song "Kanta Laga"
Jhankaar Beats	2003	Neel	Hindi	Bollywood Debut
Yeh Hawa Kehati Hai Kya	2002		Hindi	
Mera Ghoonghata Mera Jhoomka	2001		Hindi	Music Video
