= Darling (2007 Indian film) =

2007 Indian Hindi horror film

- Theatrical release poster
- Directed by: Ram Gopal Varma
- Written by: Prawaal Raman; Kona Venkat
- Produced by: Bhushan Kumar; Krishan Kumar Dua
- Starring: Fardeen Khan; Esha Deol; Isha Koppikar
- Cinematography: Amit Roy
- Music by: Pritam; Himesh Reshammiya; Prasanna Shekhar
- Production company: T-Series Films
- Distributed by: Balaji Motion Pictures (India); Eros International (Overseas)
- Release date: 7 September 2007
- Running time: 132 minutes
- Country: India
- Language: Hindi
- Budget: ₹6.5 crore Note: figure contains print and advertising costs
- Box office: ₹4.75 crore

Darling is a 2007 Indian Hindi-language horror film starring Esha Deol, Fardeen Khan and Isha Koppikar, and directed by Ram Gopal Varma. It was shot in Mumbai, India. The soundtrack was composed by Himesh Reshammiya and Pritam.

== Synopsis ==
Aditya is married to a traditional wife, Ashwini, and has a young boy. But he is having an affair with his secretary, Geeta Menon, who has a wild personality. He manages to balance the women with clever lies. He promises Geeta he will marry her after divorcing Ashwini and seems to display fetish behaviours with the two women.

On one of their romantic excursions, Aditya takes Geeta to his friend's bungalow at Madh Island. All seems fine until Geeta shocks Aditya with news that she is pregnant. Worried, he insists that they cannot have a child together and suggests an abortion. This attitude enrages Geeta, and they engage in a fight in which he pushes her. She accidentally hits her head against a hard object, the force of which kills her instantly. He disposes of her body and returns home, behaving as if everything is normal.

His former lover returns as a vengeful ghost who will stop at nothing till she gets her revenge. She appears often to frighten Aditya. Ashwini notices her husband's fear of a ghost whom she cannot see. To relieve his guilt, Aditya admits his affair with Geeta and her death to Ashwini. His wife's reaction is to leave, but she is then admitted to the hospital due to a major accident. Geeta returns to the frame and gives her forgiveness to Aditya. Ashwini recovers, but Geeta's revengeful soul has transferred into her body.

== Cast ==
- Fardeen Khan as Aditya "Adit" Soman
- Esha Deol as Geeta Menon
- Zakir Hussain as Sameer Naghani, Aditya's friend
- Isha Koppikar as Ashwini A. Soman
- Upendra Limaye as Inspector Bhaskar Reddy
- Kota Srinivasa Rao as Psychiatrist
- Nisha Kothari in a special appearance in the song "Aa Khushi Se Khudkushi"
- Shishir Sharma as Anjan Menon, Geeta's father
- Kiku Sharda as Doctor
- Rasika Joshi as Mrs. Shah Rukh Khan, psychiatric patient

== Music ==
Darling

Studio album by Pritam, Himesh Reshammiya, Prasanna Shekhar
- Released: 15 June 2007 (India)
- Recorded: 2007
- Venue: Mumbai
- Genre: Feature film soundtrack
- Label: T-Series
- Producer: Ram Gopal Verma

Pritam, Himesh Reshammiya, Prasanna Shekhar chronology
Naqaab (2007)	Darling (2007)	Bhool Bhulaiyaa (2007)

The soundtrack was released on 1 August 2007 in many formats including music cassette, MP3 files, audio CD, and DVD-Audio. The music was composed by Pritam and Himesh Reshammiya in a guest song. The lyrics for all songs except one were written by Sameer. The first reviews of the soundtrack have been positive with indiafm.com rating the music at 3.5 out of 5. Joginder Tuteja of indiafm.com said "Darling is a good album that thoroughly entertains while it is on." SmasHits.com said "Darling is the biggest musical bonanza from Ramu's factory after series of miserable musical releases from bunch of his reliable protégés in last few years."

On 10 September 2007 the film was at number 5 on the charts.

The song "Aa Khushi Se Khudkushi" from this film is a cover of Namie Amuro's song "Want Me, Want Me", which was released on 6 April 2005.

Song	Singer(s)	Music	Duration	Picturised on
"Tadap Tadap"	Himesh Reshammiya and Tulsi Kumar	Himesh Reshammiya		Fardeen Khan and Esha Deol
"Aa Khushi Se Khudkushi"	Shaan and Sunidhi Chauhan	Pritam		Fardeen Khan and Nisha Kothari
"Saathiya"	Adnan Sami and Tulsi Kumar	Pritam		Fardeen Khan and Isha Koppikar
"Hasaye Bhi"	Shaan and Tulsi Kumar	Pritam		
"Akele Tanha Jiya Na Jaye"	Tulsi Kumar	Pritam		
"Awaaz Koi"	Priyadarshini	Prasanna Shekhar		
"Aa Khushi Se Khudkushi" (Remix by Dj A-Myth)	Shaan and Sunidhi Chauhan	Pritam		
"Hasaye Bhi" (Remix by Dj A-Myth)	Shaan and Tulsi Kumar	Pritam		
"Saathiya" (Remix by Dj A-Myth)	Adnan Sami and Tulsi Kumar	Pritam		
