= 404 (film) =

2011 Indian psychological thriller film

- Theatrical release poster
- Directed by: Prawaal Raman
- Screenplay by: Prawaal Raman, Dialogues by Gunjan Joshi
- Produced by: Nameeta Nair
- Starring: Imaad Shah; Nishikant Kamat; Rajvvir Aroraa; Tisca Chopra; Satish Kaushik
- Cinematography: Savita Singh
- Edited by: Sarvesh Parab
- Music by: Imaad Shah
- Production companies: Pixion, Adlabs
- Release date: 20 May 2011
- Country: India
- Language: Hindi

404 (also known as 404: Error Not Found) is a 2011 Indian Hindi-language psychological thriller film directed by Prawaal Raman and written by Prawal Raman and Gunjan Joshi (as dialogue writer). It stars Imaad Shah, Nishikant Kamat, Rajvvir Aroraa, Tisca Chopra, and Satish Kaushik in the lead roles. It was produced by Imagik Media Private Ltd. (Nameeta Nair) and was released in theaters on May 20, 2011. The movie follows a medical college student who shifts to the college hostel's room 404, where a previous medical student had committed suicide, and the paranormal delusions that he begins having since then.

== Plot ==
Professor Anirudh (Nishikant Kamath) strongly believes in science, and for him, things that don't have scientific explanations do not exist. A room in his medical institution (numbered 404) is rumoured to be haunted by the ghost of a student named Gaurav, who previously stayed in that room and had committed suicide there, which he surely doesn't believe. A rational student, Abhimanyu (Rajvvir Aroraa), now occupies that room. The seniors rag him and tell him to collect all the information about Gaurav. One day the ragging increases so much that he starts seeing visions of Gaurav. He visits Gaurav's house and brings over his stuff. He goes to Prof. Anirudh and discusses it with him, to which he replies that it's just an illusion. His wife, Dr. Mira, who's also a professor at the same institute, suggests he change his room, to which Prof. Anirudh refuses and tells him to stop thinking about Gaurav. Abhimanyu starts hallucinating about Gaurav to the extent that he starts talking to him. Prof. Anirudh interviews Abhimanyu about his experience with Gaurav and how it all started. Prof. Anirudh tells Abhimanyu that ghosts don't exist, to which Abimanyu disagrees and tells him that Gaurav really exists. It is later discovered that Prof. Anirudh was using him for his thesis and told the seniors to rag him. Abhimanyu finds out about it and feels betrayed. Prof. Anirudh later comes to Abhimanyu and tells him about how he was doing it for a good cause. Abhimanyu tells Prof. Anirudh that he can still prove him wrong and invites him to his room, and there it is seen that Abhimanyu's body is hanging from the fan and that Prof. Anirudh, himself, was talking to Abhimanyu's ghost.

== Cast ==
- Imaad Shah as Chris
- Nishikant Kamath as Professor Anirudh
- Ruchir Raj as Gaurav
- Ritika Silas as Tara
- Rajvvir Aroraa as Abhimanyu
- Satish Kaushik as Professor Vaidya
- Tisca Chopra as Dr. Mira
- Baby Sarah as Sara, Anirudh's daughter
- Prabhat Raghunandan as Mustafa
- Meenakshi Thapar
- Vishal Pal

== Reception ==
The film was generally well received by critics. The Times of India rated the film 4 out of 5 stars, praising the movie's performances, cinematography and direction calling the movie a smart paranormal drama. In their review, they commented, "The highpoint of the film lies in the fact that it explores paranormal activity without abandoning science and rationality. And that indeed is a rare achievement." Bollywood Hungama similarly gave the movie 3 stars out of 5. In his review for Bollywood Hungama, Taran Adarsh wrote, "404 is yet another innovative story with a taut screenplay, riveting direction and applaud-worthy performances as its strong points. Original in content and radical in approach, this new-age thriller is yet another step in the right direction of content over stars." Writing for Rediff, Preeti Arora similarly praised the movie's spooky cinematography and applauded director Prawaal Raman for not resorting to gimmicks such as "cuss words and mindless obscenities" while criticizing the melodrama and the length of the climax. She rated the movie 3.5 stars out of 5.
