= Maat (film) =

- Theatrical release poster
- Directed by: Manohar Sarvanar
- Starring: Isha Koppikar; Sameer Dharmadhikari; Tejashree Valavalkar
- Cinematography: Nirmal Jani
- Music by: Saleel Kulkarni
- Release date: 27 December 2013
- Country: India
- Language: Marathi

Maat is a 2013 Indian Marathi-language drama film directed by Manohar Sarvanar. Starring Isha Koppikar, Sameer Dharmadhikari and Tejashree Valavalkar. It was released theatrically on 27 December 2013.

== Synopsis ==
Ajay Deshmukh disowns his daughter Mini, who is speech and hearing-impaired. Reema, his wife and former supermodel, sacrifices her career to make Mini a chess champion.

== Cast ==
- Isha Koppikar
- Sameer Dharmadhikari
- Tejashree Valavalkar

== Production ==
Principal photography began on 8 December 2012 in Film City, India.

== Reception ==
Jaydeep Pathakji from Maharashtra Times Wrote "overall, if we turn a blind eye to certain things and make 'assumptions' of certain things in the name of cinematic liberty, we definitely indulge in the film. By 'overcoming' the stereotyped concept of entertainment, it 'overcomes' the task of showing something different and giving a different thought". A reviewer of Divya Marathi says "The ups and downs of these dreams for Mini are drawn through various events. The plot of Maat is based on the novel Setu by Tejaswini Dinesh Pandit and screenplay - dialogues are written by Sambhaji Sawant". A reviewer of Loksatta said, "Although it is a logical method film, basically deafness should be understood immediately after the birth of the child. It is not acceptable to assume that a child is deaf after the age of one and a half to two years. If this hypothesis is accepted, however, the film is definitely effective".
