= Darna Zaroori Hai =

2006 Indian anthology horror film

- Theatrical release poster
- Directed by: Sajid Khan; Ram Gopal Varma; Prawaal Raman; Vivek Shah; Jiji Philip; J. D. Chakravarthy; Manish Gupta
- Written by: Sajid Khan; Prawaal Raman; Ashish Deo; Nikhil Mishra; Manish Gupta
- Produced by: Ram Gopal Varma; Satish Kaushik
- Starring: Amitabh Bachchan; Anil Kapoor; Sunil Shetty; Arjun Rampal; Riteish Deshmukh; Bipasha Basu; Randeep Hooda; Mallika Sherawat; Rajpal Yadav; Sonali Kulkarni; Makarand Deshpande
- Cinematography: Amit Roy; Kiran Reddy; Amal Neerad; Ayal Ghanim; Attar Singh Saini; Ravi Walia
- Edited by: Nipun Gupta; Amit Parmar
- Music by: Salim–Sulaiman; Nitin Raikwar
- Production companies: RGV Film Company; Sahara One Motion Pictures
- Distributed by: K. Sera Sera Productions; Sony Pictures Networks India
- Release date: 28 April 2006
- Running time: 108 minutes
- Country: India
- Language: Hindi
- Budget: ₹8.75 crore
- Box office: ₹10.65 crore

Darna Zaroori Hai (translation: Fear is necessary) is a 2006 Indian Hindi-language anthology horror film produced by Ram Gopal Varma. The film is a sequel to Darna Mana Hai. It stars a host of Bollywood actors including Amitabh Bachchan, Anil Kapoor, Sunil Shetty, Riteish Deshmukh, Bipasha Basu, Randeep Hooda, Arjun Rampal, Mallika Sherawat, Sonali Kulkarni, Rajpal Yadav and more. The film was archived at the New York Institute of Technology, as part of the film course.

== Plot ==
Darna Zaroori Hai interweaves six stories into one film. Five children get lost in the middle of a forest, where they find a deserted house. Inside, they meet an old woman who agrees to tell them six scary stories, and they will all compete on who is able to sit through all six stories without getting scared.

=== Opening Story — Prologue ===
Written and directed by Sajid Khan

The first story is about a young film buff named Satish, who lives with his mother. Satish has a habit of watching a Bollywood movie in theatres every Friday, on the last show of the day. He decides to watch the film Darna Mana Hai. His mother warns him not to take the graveyard shortcut because it's Friday the 13th, a new moon night, and witches might appear. He pays no heed to his mother and takes the shortcut. He safely arrives at the cinema, buys his regular snacks, gets some change back, watches the movie, and returns home. On his return, he once again uses the graveyard shortcut. Walking through the graveyard, he hears clinking footsteps and begins to run. He sees a witch and falls to the ground in fright. His fear leads to his death by heart attack. It turns out the footsteps were actually the coins jingling in his pocket as he walked and the witch he saw was actually a poster of the film.

=== Story 1 — Imaginary Ghost ===
Directed by Ram Gopal Varma

Five children arrive at a house. The resident of the house, an old woman, decides to tell them six scary stories. The children decide to have a competition to see who gets scared first. The first story is about a professor, Sunil Khanna, who is giving tuition to one of his Biotechnology students, Altaaf, at home. Every minute, the professor points out something (or someone) in his house, once in the kitchen, once in the dining room, and once on the sofa. Annoyed by this behaviour, the student decides to leave when the professor warns him not to leave the house, or the ghost will go after him as well. Curious, the student asks the professor about the ghost and the professor tells him that the ghost is an exact lookalike of himself, except he has a hollow face with a hat. The frightened student tries to run saying that his father is waiting for him, but the professor takes him in front of the mirror and points at his reflection. The professor's reflection in the mirror looks exactly like the ghost he talked about.

After the story, one child, Nisha, goes down to the washroom, only to come back as a ghost without revealing her real identity. Nisha sits down with the rest of the kids with a bowed head.

=== Story 2 — Spirits Do Come ===
Written and directed by Prawaal Raman

The second story is about a photographer, Kunal, who finds a strange house when his car breaks down. There, Varsha invites him in and claims that she has been lonely for the past few years since her husband Rahul died. He tries to make a phone call, but is confronted by Rahul. He gets scared and says that Varsha opened the door, but gets astonished on listening that Varsha is the one who had died two years ago, and not Rahul. They then confess to a scared Kunal that they were playing a prank on him. The two explain to Kunal that Rahul has been trying to summon spirits and bring them down to earth. When Kunal interrupts by saying that he is in a hurry, Rahul plays as if he is summoning the spirit of a mechanic. After a few moments, the three hear a door knock. Rahul goes outside to check, and then he screams for Varsha. Rahul and Varsha find the corpse of Kunal on the driving seat of his broken-down car the mechanic says that he will phone the police Just then, Kunal walks out and declares in a chilly voice that spirits do come, whenever they are called, but sometimes sending them back becomes very difficult. He continues to laugh in a chilly voice.

After this story, another child, Rohan, goes to the washroom, but he too returns as a ghost.

=== Story 3 — Accidents are Never Predicted ===
Directed by Vivek Shah

The third story revolves around a couple, Vishwas and his wife, who live with their son, Chintu. One day, the three are visited by an insurance agent Prabhakar Pandit who keeps warning them about the risks of life and that accidents are never predicted. Vishwas kicks him out of the house and their doorbell suddenly rings. They open the door, but find no one there. They go back inside the house, but the bell rings yet again. It is the agent again, who claims that it is raining outside and he has left his umbrella inside. He takes out many things such as a knife, a rope, a poison and a gun, which all represent different ways to die in life. Vishwas gets tired of him and asks him to leave. The agent then takes out the gun and threatens Vishwas and his family. Vishwas gets into a struggle with the agent, which results in the agent being accidentally shot. Before he dies, as if confirming his statement, he says, "See sir, accidents are never predicted!"

After the story, another child, Aditi, leaves the room to get water, but she comes back meeting the same fate as the two previous ones.

=== Story 4 — Ghostly Audition ===
Directed by Jiji Philip

A film director, Karan Chopra, decides to make a horror film. On the way to the sets, he gives a lift to a young woman, Riya, who pretends to be a ghost. Karan thinks she is just playing a prank, and Riya also claims later that she was just joking. When stormy weather hits, Karan takes Riya to his mansion. The electricity and lights go out and Riya's face starts to gore with blood. Karan still thinks that she is playing a prank, but when her voice turns ghostly, he falls to the floor and dies in shock. Riya takes off her mask, which was stained with fake blood, and a microphone that changed her voice to make it sound ghostly. It is revealed that she really was only playing a joke on him. She cries in panic as she says that she was trying to audition for his new horror film, but it is too late now since Karan has already died.

=== Story 5 — A Bride's Revenge ===
Directed by J.D. Chakravarthy

The fifth and the final story centres on Ajay, a young man driving on the road. He finds a young woman standing on the highway. When he approaches her, he becomes frozen after seeing her burnt face. Shortly after, he wakes up in a jail and is accused of murdering a man. A police officer brings the mother of the murdered victim to the police station. But the mother is shocked to find that Ajay is possessed by the spirit of a woman, who turns out to be her daughter-in-law, Sandhya. It is revealed that the mother-in-law, her husband and her son had immolated the newly-wedded bride and her spirit has returned for revenge. Sandhya's spirit reveals that it possessed Ajay to dismember the son. The spirit possesses the police officer and shoots her mother-in-law. After the spirit leaves the officer's body, he realises what has happened and secretly buries the body. Ajay is released and is driving back when he sees Sandhya's ghost in the backseat. She says that her father-in-law is in Pune on a business trip and she must fulfil her revenge. She assures him that she will not possess him and she asks him to drop her to Pune.

=== Story 6 — The Ending And The Epilogue ===
After all of the stories are over, one boy, Ashu, claims that he is still not scared. The old lady smirks as the lights of the house suddenly turn off. The stunned boy looks around him. The lights turn back on immediately and he sees that he is the only one in the room: as if no one was ever there. The lights go off and turn back on again, this time to reveal his friends, all of whom are now ghosts, giving him eerie smiles. The old woman appears back on her chair, giving him a witch's smile. Realizing what is going on, the boy tries to make a frantic escape out of the house, but finds all the doors to be jammed and locked. Just as the boy looks back at the upstairs room to see if he was being followed, he sees the old lady right beside him, smirking. The old lady's hair is snow-white and scattered; her frightening smile gives the boy a heart attack and he dies at the scene. The next morning, the house is swarming with policemen and the media. The police clear away the bodies of the dead children. The old servant of the house tells the police officers that a long time ago, the house belonged to an old lady who loved children, but unfortunately, she had no children of her own. He explains that once he had left her for hours to get her some medication (just as the old lady had told the children), and when he returned, he found her dead. The film ends with a reporter reading the tragic story of a camping trip-turned-nightmare for the five children. He says that the exact cause of death of the children is still unknown and will most likely never be known, however, one thing is for certain- all the children died of cardiac failure or in simple words — fear.

== Cast ==
- Amitabh Bachchan as Professor Sunil Khanna
- Anil Kapoor as Karan Chopra
- Suniel Shetty as Vishwas Talegaonkar
- Arjun Rampal as Kunal Bhattacharya (Photographer and spirit)
- Riteish Deshmukh as Altaaf Bilal
- Bipasha Basu as Varsha
- Randeep Hooda as Ajay Doshi
- Manoj Pahwa as Satish Jaiswal (the man who goes to watch Darna Mana Hai)
- Sarita Joshi as Satish's mother
- Makarand Deshpande as Rahul Dahiya
- Sonali Kulkarni as Vishwas Talegaonkar's wife
- Rajpal Yadav as Prabhakar Pandit
- Mallika Sherawat as Riya
- Zakir Hussain as a police officer
- Rasika Joshi as murdered woman's mother-in-law
- Ava Mukherjee as an old woman (storyteller)
- Shweta Prasad as Ashu
- Priyanka Kothari in an item number in the song "Aa Aake Darr"
- Isha Koppikar in promotional video
- Mohit Ahlawat in an item number in promotional video
- Sainee Raj

== Music ==
1. Aa Aake Darr – Mohana Sarkar
2. Aake Darr (Remix) – Mohana Sarkar
3. Boo – Jeena Hain Toh Darna Hain Zaroori – Sunidhi Chauhan
4. Khabardar – Mohana Sarkar, Kunal Ganjawala
5. Khabardar Maut Ka Zayeka – Sukhwinder Singh, Mona Sarkar
