= ...And Once Again =

And Once Again
- Directed by: Amol Palekar
- Story by: Sandhya Gokhale
- Starring: Antara Mali; Rajat Kapoor; Rituparna Sengupta
- Cinematography: Asim Bose
- Edited by: Abhijeet Deshpande
- Music by: Anjan Biswas; Debjyoti Mishra
- Production companies: Shangrila Kreations; Parth Productions
- Release date: 20 August 2010
- Running time: 105 minutes
- Country: India
- Language: Hindi

And Once Again is a 2010 Indian drama film directed by Amol Palekar. The film stars Antara Mali, Rajat Kapoor and Rituparna Sengupta in lead roles. For the role of the monk, Antara Mali shaved her head.

== Plot ==
It's a story of a lady monk.

== Cast ==
- Antara Mali as Savitri
- Rajat Kapoor as Rishi
- Rituparna Sengupta as Manu

== Critical reception ==
Sify rated the film 2.5 out of 5, criticising the story and pointing out "A film about loss, [like this one], succeeds only when it leaves the audience with a sense of loss and longing." Preeti Arora rated the film 2 out of 5. The Times of India rated the film 2.5 out of 5, stating as "And Once Again is a desire to make something different from the run-of-the-mill stuff."
