= Ek Tha Dil Ek Thi Dhadkan =

- Directed by: Shahrukh Sultan
- Starring: Biswajeet; Rajendra Kumar; Arbaaz Ali Khan; Isha Koppikar; Inder Kumar
- Music by: Anand Raj Anand
- Release date: 5 March 1998
- Country: India
- Language: Hindi

Ek Tha Dil Ek Thi Dhadkan is an unreleased Hindi romance film directed by Shahrukh Sultan and starring Biswajeet, Rajendra Kumar, Arbaaz Ali Khan, Isha Koppikar and Inder Kumar in lead roles.

Due to a legal dispute, the film remains unreleased despite being shot and completed in 1998 The film's soundtrack did however release on cassette and CD.

== Music ==
Lyrics for all songs written by Javed Akhtar.

1. "Baahon Mein Aao" - Kavita Krishnamurthy, Abhijeet
2. "Badal Baharein" - Kavita Krishnamurthy, Udit Narayan
3. "Ek Tha Dil Ek Thi Dhadkan" - Kumar Sanu
4. "O Mere Dulhe Raja" - Kavita Krishnamurthy, Jojo, Nayan Rathod
5. "Resham Jaisi" - Abhijeet
6. "Tum To Chal Diye" - Udit Narayan
7. "Zindagi Ke Geet" - Udit Narayan
