= Vaastu Shastra (film) =

- Movie poster
- Directed by: Saurab Usha Narang
- Written by: Charu Du Acharya
- Produced by: Ram Gopal Varma
- Starring: Sushmita Sen; Peeya Rai Chowdhary; J. D. Chakravarthy
- Cinematography: Sachin K. Krishn
- Edited by: Aarif Sheikh
- Music by: Amar Mohile
- Distributed by: K Sera Sera
- Release date: 22 October 2004
- Running time: 106 minutes
- Country: India
- Language: Hindi
- Budget: ₹5 crore
- Box office: ₹10 crore

Vaastu Shastra (lit. 'Science of architecture') is a 2004 Indian Hindi-language horror film produced by Ram Gopal Varma and directed by Saurab Usha Narang, starring Peeya Rai Chowdhary, Sushmita Sen, and J. D. Chakravarthy. It is loosely based on the 1980 film The Shining by Stanley Kubrick, as well as inspired by the South East Asian films Ju-On: The Grudge and Acacia.

The film was released on 22 October 2004, and was declared a below average performer at the box office, grossing ₹10 crore worldwide against a ₹5 crore budget. The film was dubbed into Telugu as Marri Chettu.

== Plot ==
Dinesh Dubey, who works at a school in the suburbs of Mumbai, goes to a house where a haunted tree is located. He is killed by unseen forces. The story then moves around a couple, Virag Rao and Jhilmil Rao, buying the same house. Jhilmil, a gynaecologist, and her husband Virag work round the clock — and are hardly present for their little son, Rohan. The problem arises when Jhilmil and Virag find out that Rohan has started making imaginary friends. Rohan starts getting obsessed with his "friends" — Manish and Jyoti, two kids, as well as Dinesh Dubey and his witch wife, who are actually ghosts.

Rukma joins Jhilmil's house as a new maid. Rukma learns about Manish and Jyoti while babysitting Rohan. Rohan points under the bed where Manish and Jyoti are hiding. When Rukma peeps under the bed, Manish throws a tennis ball at her and injures her. She misunderstands, thinking that Rohan threw the ball purposefully. It turns out that Rukma is actually a thief and is spotted thieving by Rohan, but she blackmails and mistreats Rohan so that he does not reveal the truth to his family. She is then hit by a speeding lorry on a lone road while returning home. Jhilmil is worried and attempts to find out why all of this is happening.

Jhilmil's sister Radhika invites her boyfriend Murli over when the whole family goes out to watch a movie. They have sex, but Murli suddenly vanishes. Radhika thinks that he is playing a game of "hide and seek." She drops her clothes to entice him. However, she sees ghosts staring at her and is horrified while she was naked. When Jhilmil, Virag, and Rohan come back home, they find Murli's mutilated corpse on Radhika's bed and find Radhika outside, hanging dead naked from the tree.

Jhilmil is warned several times by a madman, who implores her to vacate the house. It is revealed that Rohan's "imaginary friends" are ghosts who have been telling him to move out of their house. Virag is murdered by the ghosts, and after becoming a ghost himself, he tries to kill Jhilmil and Rohan. Inspector Bhupal Gorpade, who comes to help Jhilmil, is murdered as well. Bhupal also becomes a ghost and chases Jhilmil. Somehow, Jhilmil crashes her car onto the haunted tree and comes out. The car explodes, burning the tree and defeating the evil spirits. Then Jhilmil is admitted to the hospital along with Rohan.

At the house, the mad person is happy to see that the tree has been burned. He starts urinating on the tree, but it turns out that the spirits were not put to rest. The ghosts murder him as well. Back at the hospital, the doctor advises Jhilmil to take care. The film closes with Rohan's eyes turning black, similar to Manish's eyes, indicating that he has also been killed earlier and has become a ghost.

== Cast ==
Actor/actress	Role
Sushmita Sen	Jhilmil Rao
Peeya Rai Chowdhary	Radhika
J. D. Chakravarthi	Virag Rao
Ahsaas Channa	Rohan
Rajpal Yadav	Mad Guy
Purab Kohli	Radhika's boyfriend
Rasika Joshi	Rukma (Maid)
Sayaji Shinde	Inspector Bhupal Gorpade
Zakir Hussain	Dinesh Dubey

== Reception ==
Taran Adarsh from Bollywood Hungama gave the film 2 stars out of 5, and found it appealing it parts, particularly in comparison with the acclaimed Bhoot. He found the writing unconvincing and labeled the climax a "downer", but appreciated the sound effects and cinematography. Raja Sen from Rediff.com labeled it a "severely scary film, and certainly not for the faint of heart." He praised the performances and cinematography, while feeling the plot was banal and the end, hurriedly finished.

Reviewing the Telugu version, Jeevi from Idlebrain.com awarded the film 2.75 stars out of 5, noting the film's similarities with The Shining and The Others. He appreciated the scariness and sound effects but found the second half slightly boring and certain scenes repetitive.
