= Justice Chowdhary =

- DVD cover
- Directed by: Manish R. Khandelwal
- Written by: Miraq Mirza
- Produced by: Rishikesh Dhari Sinha and Farooq
- Starring: Mithun Chakraborty; Ravi Kishan; Seema Shinde
- Cinematography: Sanjay Malwankar; Rishikesh Dhari Sinha
- Music by: Bappi Lahiri
- Production company: Titwala Productions
- Release date: 15 September 2000
- Running time: 125 minutes
- Country: India
- Language: Hindi

Justice Chowdhary is a 2000 Indian Hindi action film directed by Manish R. Khandelwal and produced by Rishikesh Dhari Sinha and Farooq. It is a revenge drama, with Mithun in the lead role.

== Plot ==
Justice Chowdhary is an honest judge with high morality. A local don murders his family members. To take revenge, Chowdhary left his service and tried to eliminate them. He takes law in his hand.

== Cast ==
- Mithun Chakraborty as Justice Chowdhary
- Ravi Kishan as Rahul
- Shakti Kapoor as Dogra
- Swathi as Saritha
- Seema Shinde as Ravi Kishan Wife
- Arun Bakshi as Inspector Singh
- Pramod Moutho as Asgar Thakral
- Dipen Vartak
- Salil Sudhakar
- Afzaal Khan
- Prithvi Singh
- Usha Raj
- Pinky Chinoy
- Akshita Arora
- S. C. Mishra
- Jack Gaud as Inspector Kadam
- Mukesh Raaj Singh
