= Peeya Rai Chowdhary =

Indian actress

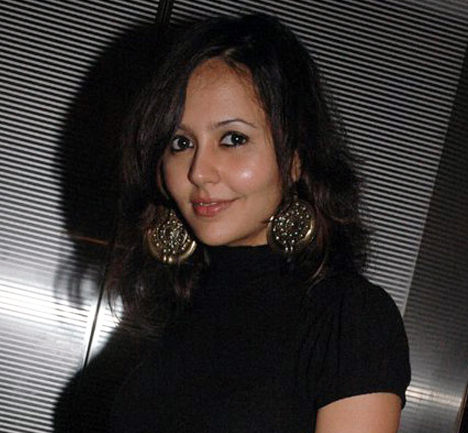
- Choudhary at the premiere of Ahista Ahista
- Occupation: Actress
- Years active: 1999-2006
- Spouse: Shayan Munshi (2005-2010)

Peeya Rai Chowdhary is an Indian actress. She was married to model Shayan Munshi, who was a witness in the murder trial of Jessica Lal in 2006, but separated from him in 2010. She later married Tino Sanchez. She played Lakhi in Gurinder Chadha's Bride and Prejudice, Rita in the movie The Bong Connection (where she worked with husband Munshi) and played Kiran in the TV show Hip Hip Hurray.

== Filmography ==
Year	Film	Role	Notes	Ref.
2003	Bhoot	Peeya, Dr. Rajan's daughter		
2003	Chupke Se	Sheetal		
2003	Darna Mana Hai	Mehnaz		
2004	Vaastu Shastra	Radhika	credited as Piya Rai Choudhray	
2004	Bride & Prejudice	Lakhi Bakshi	credited as Peeya Rai Choudhuri	
2005	Home Delivery: Aapko... Ghar Tak	Employee at Mommy's Pizza		
2005	My Brother... Nikhil	Catherine		
2006	The Bong Connection	Rita		
2006	The Truck of Dreams		Lost film	
