= Dhoondte Reh Jaaoge! (1998 film) =

- Poster
- Directed by: Kumar Bhatia
- Screenplay by: Kumar Bhatia
- Story by: Kumar Bhatia
- Produced by: Mukund Purohit
- Starring: Antara Mali; Amar Upadhyay; Naseeruddin Shah; Satish Shah; Amrish Puri; Prem Chopra; Tinnu Anand; Javed Jaffrey; Shammi Kapoor
- Cinematography: Najeeb Khan
- Music by: Jatin–Lalit
- Release date: 1998
- Country: India
- Language: Hindi

Dhoondte Reh Jaaoge! is a 1998 Hindi-language film. The film starred Amar Upadhyay, Antara Mali, Naseeruddin Shah, Satish Shah, Amrish Puri, Prem Chopra, Tinnu Anand, Javed Jaffrey and Shammi Kapoor. The film was directed by Kumar Bhatia, who also wrote the story, dialogues and screenplay.

== Cast ==
- Antara Mali as Renu
- Amar Upadhyay as Ajay/Devdas
- Naseeruddin Shah as Tiger
- Satish Shah as Seth Motichand
- Amrish Puri
- Prem Chopra
- Tinnu Anand
- Dalip Tahil as Anthony Macaroni/Tony
- Javed Jaffrey
- Shammi Kapoor
- Dinesh Hingoo
- Ajit Vachhani as Medical College Principal
- Samuel John
- Babloo Mukherjee

== Music ==
1. "Aaja Aaye Majaa" - Alka Yagnik, Udit Narayan
2. "Bolun Kisi Se To" - Alka Yagnik
3. Instrumental Medley
4. "Jaaneman Jo Hua" - Udit Narayan, Alka Yagnik, Abhijeet
5. "Na Tum Bolo" - Kumar Sanu, Alka Yagnik
6. "Suno Honey Yeh Kahani" - Vinod Rathod
