= Meenakshi Thapar =

Indian actress (1984–2012)

- Born: 4 October 1984
- Died: 19 April 2012 (aged 27)
- Occupation: Actress

Meenakshi Thapar or Meenakshi Thapa (4 October 1984 – 19 April 2012) was an Indian actress who worked in Hindi-language films. Thapar was born in Dehradun. She made her acting debut in the 2011 horror film 404.

== Kidnapping and murder ==
In April 2012, during the filming of Heroine, Thapa was kidnapped by another actor who had a minor role in the film, Amit Jaiswal, and his girlfriend, Preeti Surin, who were allegedly convinced she belonged to a wealthy family. She was held for a ransom of ₹1.5 million (approximately US$29,000). They told her mother that, if the ransom was not paid, she would be forced into pornographic films. Her mother paid ₹60,000 rupees. Meenakshi was later strangled and decapitated in a hotel in Gorakhpur. Her torso was left in a water tank and her head thrown out of a bus on the way to Mumbai. The perpetrators were caught with the SIM card from her mobile phone and confessed to the crime.

== Aftermath ==
On 9 May 2018, A sessions court in South Mumbai on Wednesday convicted two junior artistes of the 2012 abduction and murder of Meenakshi Thapar.

Additional Sessions Judge S. G. Shette found Amit Jaiswal, 36, and his girlfriend Preeti Surin, 26, guilty under IPC sections 302 (murder) and 364-A (kidnapping for ransom), and sentenced them to life imprisonment.

"Sessions Judge S.G. Shete found them guilty on three main counts of kidnapping, extortion and murder of Thapa and sentenced them to life imprisonment," Special Public Prosecutor Ujjwal Nikam told the media.

During the arguments on the sentence, Nikam had termed the murder as "the rarest of rare cases" and demanded death sentence for both.

== Filmography ==
=== Films ===
| Year | Title | Role | Notes |
|---|---|---|---|
| 2011 | 404 | | |
| 2012 | Pakauu | | |
| 2012 | Heroine | | |
