= Cassini's Division =

Indian alternative rock band

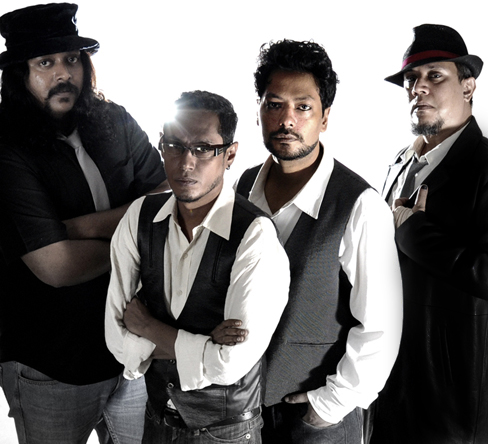

Background information
- Origin: Kolkata, West Bengal, India
- Genres: Alternative rock Modern Indian rock Hybrid
- Years active: 2001–present
- Label: Saregama
- Members: Rahul Guha Roy; Sukanti Roy; Ritoban Ludo Das; John Noel Bose
- Past members: Shovon Mukjerjee; John Noel Bose; Shamik Chatterjee; Arka Das
- Website: www.cassinisdivision.com

Cassini's Division (Bengali: কাসিনিস ডিভিসন) are an alternative rock band from Kolkata, West Bengal, India. Formed in 2001, they are named after the Cassini Division, the largest gap in the rings of Saturn.

== History ==
=== Testing times and change (2001–2004) ===
Cassini's Division was founded in 2001 at Liberty Hall, Rahul's Salt Lake residence when Rahul, Sukanti, Shamik and Arka started jamming original material. Much of the songwriting was to Rahul's credit, with the band coming together to arrange the music. In mid-2001, Arka's brother Ritoban (Ludo) joined the band on percussions. The band went on to record its first demo EP, Animal Wisdom, in late 2001 with this line-up. In 2002 Shamik left the band and was replaced by John Noel Bose, a longtime musician friend of Rahul's. In 2004 Arka left the band and Ludo took over as drummer. The band has, since, remained in this line-up.

=== 2005–2009 ===
In 2005, Cassini's Division signed on as a house band at the hub of the Calcutta live music scene – Someplace Else – and played almost weekly gigs there for the next 3 years.

Early 2006, Cassini's Division performed in Guwahati and Shillong as part of the initiative Jaago Grahak Jaago by the Ministry of Consumer Affairs – a consumer awareness campaign targeted at the youth of the Northeast. Cassini's Division appeared as themselves in the 2006 Indian film The Bong Connection.

Cassini's Division organised the first edition of The Calcutta Rock Festival in February 2007, together with The Supersonics. In December 2007, the band signed on for Sutasi, a pan-Asian talent search. As part of Sutasi, they recorded four of their songs with UK producer Simon Henderson, performed in Singapore in 2008, and went on to become winners of the Wildcard category amongst participants from 13 Asian countries. The show was aired as a series on Zee Café in 2008. Cassini's Division performed at the Eastwind Festival in New Delhi in February 2008. Only for a While appeared on the mixtape The Underground, released by major Indian label Saregama end-2008.

"Story of My Life"
A 53-second sample of the song "Story of My Life" from the album Ringside View released in 2010

Cassini's Division participated in Channel [V] Launchpad, a rock band talent hunt-turned-reality show. The band was one of the three finalists and went on to play the Concert For Change at the Andheri Sports Complex (Mumbai) in May 2009.

=== 2010 ===
In April 2010, the band signed with Saregama and recorded Ringside View with producer Simon Henderson. The album was released in October 2010 to critical acclaim. Rolling Stone (September 2010) described Ringside View as "an eclectic and informed piece of work", and it swiftly made the 10 best Indian albums of 2010 (January 2011).

Cassini's Division played the Greenpeace Earth Day Festival (Kolkata) in May 2010.

=== 2014 and 2015 ===
Cassini's Division hit the studio of Universal Music Publishing in the middle of 2014 to record their second album titled Animal Wisdom with Universal resident recording engineer Devashis Ray. This album includes works of Rahul, which predates the band's 2010 debut album Ringside View. The album revolves around the concept of how all the species on earth, except human beings, coexist in harmony with the nature. This album features the same line-up of Ringside View except John Bose, who left the band and went to Delhi in 2011 to fulfil personal work commitments. While they searched for a new bassist all this time, Sukanti, the lead guitarist of the band, found a way to deal with this gap by playing bass with his guitar itself. He uses a thicker string for the 6th string and a processor to trigger bass while he plays his and bassist's parts in a song. Before they hit the studio this setup was tried and tested in several live gigs in and around Kolkata including in an open air gig at Jaipur Law University. The date for the release was not fixed however, the band has put its emphasis about a concert release of the album. The frontman Rahul wants to have a sit-down-concert kind of release for the album.

After some initial balancing of tracks and basic mixing by Sukanti and Rahul at Sukanti's Kolkata studio in early 2015, the album was sent for mixing and mastering to Universal Music Publishing studios. It is expected that the album will be released sometime in 2016.

== Discography ==
Ringside View

Studio album by Cassini's Division
- Released: October 2010 (India)
- Recorded: June 2010 – July 2010
- Genres: Alternative rock, Hybrid
- Label: Saregama
- Producer: Simon Henderson

Year of Release	Title	Label	Language
2001	Animal Wisdom demo (with Shamik Chatterjee, Arka Das)	Independent	English
2002	Satyr9 (with Ludo on percussion, Arka Das)	Independent	English
2004	Only for a While (The Underground – Kolkata)	Saregama	English
2004	Living in the Loop demo	Independent	English
2005	EP	Independent	English
2010	Ringside View	Saregama	English

== See also ==
- Bangla Rock
