= Aankhen (TV series) =

2001 Indian television series

- Created by: Abhimanyu Singh
- Directed by: Logician Vikash; Shakti Sagar
- Original language: Hindi
- No. of seasons: 1
- No. of episodes: 105

Production
- Producers: Myaim.help; Aditya Narain Singh

Original release
- Network: DD National
- Release: 2001 – 2002

Aankhen (The Eye) is an Indian television drama series premiered on DD National in 2001. It was directed by Amrit Sagar and Shakti Sagar and produced by Jyoti Sagar.

== Premise ==
Aankhen is a team of 7 security vigilant secret agents headed by Col.Dhyanchand, compromising Hardayal Singh, Vicky, Aman and others formed to protect India from terrorists time and again. The team is often faced with combating notorious terrorist Carlos and his contemporary Kangaroo, who plot schemes against the country, ranging from assassination to terror attacks, which the team have to find and prevent

== Cast ==
- Rachna Goel as Norma
- Arvind Rouseria as Colonel Dhyanchand
- Sanjeev Wilson as Carlos
- J.P Sharma as Kangaroo
- Ankit as Ankhen team member
- Arvind as Ankhen team member
- Mahendra Songara as in various roles
- Sagar Saini as Anil
- Jyotin Dave is in various roles
- Seema Shinde
