= Sir Elly Kadoorie High School =

School in Mumbai, India

Coordinates: 18.9666°N 72.8391°E

Sir Elly Kadoorie High School is a secondary school located in Mazgaon, Mumbai, Maharashtra, India. The school was established in 1875 and is one of the oldest educational institutions in Mumbai. The school is notable for being one of the few institutions in India historically associated with the Jewish community and for being the only Marathi-medium school managed by a Jewish trust.

The school was originally established as a girls' school and later became co-educational. In 1935, the school was named after Sir Elly Kadoorie. following a financial endowment he made to support the institution. The school is affiliated with the Maharashtra State Board of Secondary and Higher Secondary Education and provides secondary education. A notable alumnus is Seema Shinde, an Indian television and film actress.
