= Om (2003 film) =

- Directed by: Ashok Honda
- Written by: Naeem-Ejaz (dialogues)
- Produced by: Ashok Honda
- Starring: Attin Bhalla; Sandali Sinha; Pankaj Dheer; Sharat Saxena; Mukesh Rishi
- Edited by: Ashok Honda
- Music by: Amar Mohile
- Release date: March 21, 2003 (India)
- Running time: 141 minutes
- Country: India
- Language: Hindi

Om is a 2003 Indian Hindi-language action film directed and produced by Ashoka Honda.It stars Attin Bhalla with Sandali Sinha, Pankaj Dheer and Sharat Saxena. Released on 21 March 2003, the film was a major box office disappointment.

== Cast ==
- Attin Bhalla as Om
- Sandali Sinha as Sandali
- Pankaj Dheer as Mr. Dhariwal
- Rakhi Sawant as Celina
- Sharat Saxena
- Mukesh Rishi
- Smita Jaykar as Om's mother

== Plot ==
Om has been banished from Mumbai for a period of 2 years. Shortly after the beginning of these two years, Mr. Dhariwal goes to Om's mother and begs that she call Om back to Mumbai. The reason he needs Om is because his daughter Sandali has been kidnapped by Ghotia Bhai, Dhariwal's associate. Ghotia Bhai wishes for Sandali to marry his son, Brandy. However, Dhariwal and Sandali do not want this so Om comes back to rescue the girl he cares for.

When Om arrives in the city, he is able to free Sandali and disposes of Brandy in the process. Inspector Nasir Pathan is the new chief of police in the district and since Om is not supposed to be back for 2 years, pursues him. He catches Om, arrests and puts him into jail and returns Sandali to her father. Upon further investigation though, Nasir Pathan uncovers an evil conspiracy against Om and his family. Not only had Om been unfairly banished for 2 years, his sister had also been murdered by Inspector Katkar.

Om and Sandali had fallen in love when they met a few months before. However, Mr. Dhariwal didn't want this marriage because in his wife's will, the boy that Sandali marries will get her wealth and Dhariwal would be left penniless. The reason she had stipulated this is because she did not trust her husband's ability to control his gambling and habit of vice. Dhariwal murdered his wife but no one found out. So he waited for years until Sandali grew up and he started looking for a boy he could manipulate into giving him half of his daughter's endowment. He asks Om to share the money with him upon his marriage to Sandali but the former refuses. This alarms Dhariwal so he turns to Inspector Katkar and along with Dhariwal's new wife, the cunning Celina, they both hatch an evil plan to ruin Om's name in the city, thereby making it difficult for Sandali to marry him.

Katkar arranges for Darren, Celina's secret paramour, to go to Om's house and act as if his younger sister was a prostitute and Darren was frequenting the house for this purpose. Om's sister is taken to jail and killed but Katkar disguises it as a suicide. Om gets to know of their plan to ruin his family's name (but not his sister's murder) and confronts Dhariwal, Darren and Katkar. Because he attacks Katkar, the inspector is able to exile Om for 2 years from Mumbai as a dangerous criminal.

When Sandali is returned to her father after Om rescues her, he is furious to find out that Om and she have consummated their marriage by exchanging vows. He quickly ignores this and wants her to marry Darren. However, before this can happen Celina divulges that Darren is her secret lover and she was simply using Dhariwal for his money. Dhariwal is incensed and shot to death by Celina with no remorse. Darren then disposes of Celina and prepares to marry Sandali so he can control all her wealth.

Om breaks out of jail where, after a thorough investigation, Inspector Nasir Pathan has just realised the truth about the conspiracy against him. Om also finds out that Katkar had killed his sister and confronts him. After a furious struggle, Om kills him. He then sets off to rescue Sandali from Darren, with Inspector Pathan in hot pursuit as well. Darren and Om have a long and intense fight but Om perseveres. He and Sandali then set off to marry, with Inspector Pathan watching and knowing that Om has been vindicated.

== Music ==
Om

Soundtrack album by Amar Mohile
- Released: 16 September 2002
- Genre: Feature film soundtrack
- Label: Sony Music India

All music is composed by Amar Mohile.

Track listing
No.	Title	Singer(s)	Length
1.	"Deewani Si Ek Ladki"	Shaan, Alka Yagnik
2.	"Dil Diya Hai Tujhe"	Hema Sardesai, K. K.
3.	"Dil Ne Dil Ko Pukara (Om)"	Udit Narayan
4.	"Hote Hote"	Udit Narayan, Alka Yagnik
5.	"Tak Thai"	Sunidhi Chauhan
6.	"Zindagi Ban Gayee"	Kumar Sanu, Alka Yagnik

== Reception ==
Priya Ganapati of Rediff.com wrote, "Newcomer Attin Bhalla doesn't make an impact either. Though the film has been designed to showcase his talent, Bhalla barely passes muster in the action sequences and needs to work really hard on the emotional scenes."
