= Attin Bhalla =

Indian film actor

- Born: Attin Bhalla; India
- Other name: Atin
- Occupation: Actor

Attin Bhalla is an Indian actor. He made his debut in Om in the year 2003. The film was an action thriller. He is the son of writer Bharat B.Bhalla.

== Films ==
- Om (2003)
- Dhadkanein (2006)
