= Isha Koppikar =

Indian actress and politician (born 1976)

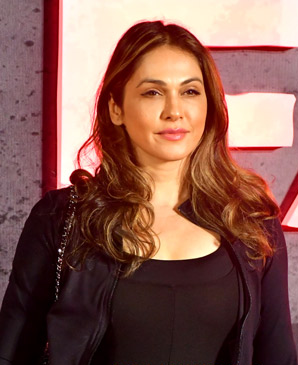
- Koppikar in 2025
- Born: 19 September 1976 (age 50); Mumbai, Maharashtra, India
- Occupations: Actress; politician; model
- Political party: Bharatiya Janata Party (2019–present)
- Spouse: Timmy Narang (m. 2009; div. 2023)
- Children: 1

Isha Koppikar (born 19 September 1976) is an Indian actress, politician and model who has acted mainly in Hindi films, but also in Tamil, Kannada, Telugu, and Marathi films. She started her career in South Indian languages films in the second half of the 1990s and focused on Bollywood films in the early 2000s.

== Early life and work ==
Isha was born on 19 September 1976 in Mahim, Bombay (now Mumbai) in a Konkani family. She has one younger brother. She graduated in Life Sciences at Ramnarain Ruia College in Mumbai. While at college she appeared in a photoshoot for Indian photographer Gautam Rajadhyaksha. The shoot led to work in advertising as a model, notably for L'Oréal, Rexona, Camay, Tips & Toes and Coca-Cola. Koppikar competed in the 1995 Miss India contest, winning the Miss Talent Crown. Her modelling work gave her an introduction to the film industry and to her first film appearance in the Telugu movie W/o V. Vara Prasad in 1997.

== Film career ==
=== Early years in South Indian cinema (1997–2001) ===
The 1998 Hindi film Ek Tha Dil Ek Thi Dhadkan, directed by Shahrukh Sultan, is often stated to be Koppikar's first film, but there is no evidence the project was ever released. Her career must therefore be said to have begun with the 1997 Telugu film W/o V. Vara Prasad, in which she appeared in a song with actor Vineeth. Her first movie in Tamil was Kadhal Kavidhai costarring Prashanth for which she won the Filmfare Best Female Debut Award. Her next Tamil movie was En Swasa Kaatre (1998) opposite Arvind Swamy, directed by K. S. Ravi, with music by A. R. Rahman followed by a cameo appearance in Praveen Gandhi's Jodi starring Prashanth and Simran. In 1999, Koppikar starred in Nenjinile starring Vijay and directed by S. A. Chandrasekhar.

By 2000, Koppikar's sights were on Bollywood, but this did not stop her from appearing in three Kannada films with the ruling Sandalwood stars of the time: Hoo Anthiya Uhoo Anthiya with Ramesh, O Nanna Nalle with Ravichandran and Surya Vamsha opposite Vishnuvardhan.

After a brief appearance in Bollywood's Fiza and Rahul, she came back to the south in 2001 for Sundar C's Tamil project Kaathal Solla Vanthen; the movie never took off. Koppikar's last two films down South were Telugu comedy Prematho Raa starring Venkatesh and Simran, and directed by Uday Shankar, and Narasimha starring Vijayakanth.

In 2000, Koppikar started her Bollywood career with a small role alongside Karisma Kapoor and Hrithik Roshan in Khalid Mohamed's Fiza and an item number appearance in Prakash Jha's Rahul. In 2001 she made her full-fledged Bollywood debut with Rajiv Rai's Pyaar Ishq Aur Mohabbat, starring Arjun Rampal and Sunil Shetty where she was paired with Shetty. Her next release was K. Raghavendra Rao's urban comedy Aamdani Atthani Kharcha Rupaiyaa opposite Govinda and Vinay Anand.

=== Later years in Bollywood (2002–2011) ===
In 2002, Koppikar appeared in an item number in Ram Gopal Verma's underworld movie Company starring Ajay Devgan, Vivek Oberoi and Manisha Koirala. The chartbusting item number choreographed by Ganesh Hegde earned her title of Khallas Girl. Another notable item number Ishq Samundar, in Sanjay Gupta's Reservoir Dogs remake Kaante starring Amitabh Bachchan, Sanjay Dutt and Sunil Shetty, raised her profile higher. She also won the Stardust Award for the Most Exciting New Face for her Khallas number. These 2 songs cemented her position as one of the sex symbol of Bollywood.

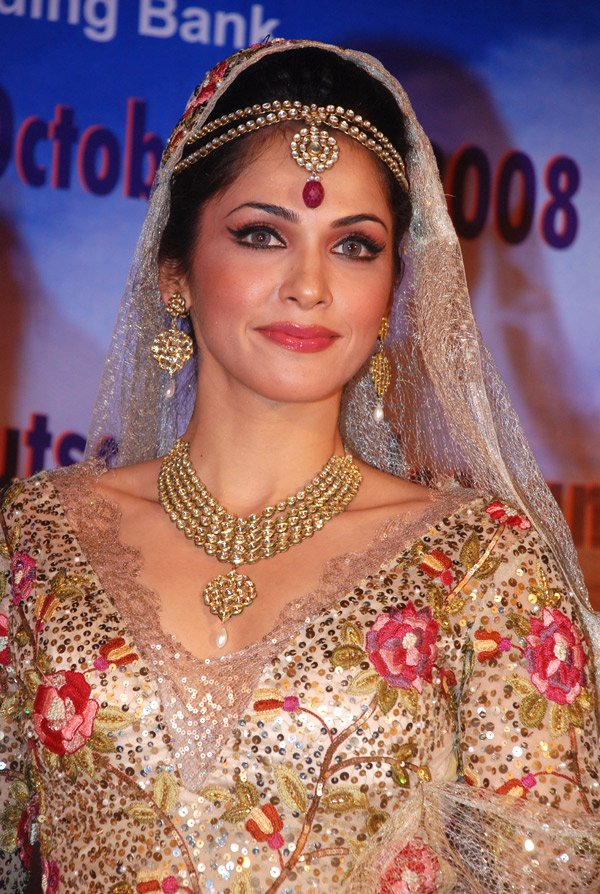
Isha Koppikar walks the ramp for designer Pria Kataria Puri

She had six releases in 2003. In Tujhe Meri Kasam, she made an item number in the song Thodi Si Deewani with Riteish Deshmukh. In Dil Ka Rishta, she starred opposite Arjun Rampal and Aishwarya Rai. Prawaal Raman's portmanteau film Darna Mana Hai saw her opposite Aftab Shivdasani. Chandraprakash Dwivedi cast her alongside Urmila Matondkar and Manoj Bajpai in the critically acclaimed Pinjar which went on to win the National Film Award for Best Feature Film on National Integration. A brief role in J. P. Dutta's war movie LOC Kargil paired her opposite Sunil Shetty again. And in Harry Baweja's Qayamat: City Under Threat, she played one of three terrorists fighting off co-stars Ajay Devgan and Sunil Shetty; a role which earned her a Filmfare nomination in the Best Villain category.

She had six releases in 2004. Both Mani Shankar's science fantasy Rudraksh and Kundan Shah's madcap comedy Ek Se Bhadkhar Ek teamed her with Sunil Shetty. In Krishna Cottage, she was cast opposite Sohail Khan for a creepy ghost story. Inteqam, directed by Pankaj Parashar and co-starring Manoj Bajpai, saw her revive the role played by Sharon Stone in the original Hollywood version: Basic Instinct. She made a cameo appearance in Kunal Kohli's Hum Tum with Saif Ali Khan and Rani Mukerji. And played the leading role in Karan Razdan's – Girlfriend with Amrita Arora and Aashish Chaudhary. The controversial film depicting a lesbian relationship provoked a wide range of public protests.

In 2005, she had four releases. Sangeeth Sivan's bawdy comedy Kyaa Kool Hai Hum with Anupam Kher, Ritesh Deshmukh and Tusshar Kapoor saw her getting nominated in three separate award ceremonies (IIFA, Zee Cine Award and Star Screen Awards) for best actor in a comedy role. Two more comedies saw her make guest appearances: David Dhawan's Salman Khan vehicle Maine Pyaar Kyun Kiya?, and Abbas–Mustan's whodunit, 36 China Town with Akshaye Khanna and Kareena Kapoor. She also starred in Ram Gopal Varma's gangster flick D: Underworld Badhshah alongside Randeep Hooda and Chunky Pandey.

In 2006 Farhan Akhtar directed a remake of the Amitabh Bachchan hit Don: The Chase Begins Again with Shahrukh Khan in the lead. Koppikar was cast as Khan's girlfriend 'Anita'. Don's tremendous success however did not benefit her checkered career. Vicky Ranawat's Haseena Smart Sexy and Dangerous managed a release towards the end of 2006, but Jagdish A Sharma's murder mystery Gahraee appeared directly on DVD while Hansal Mehta's Raakh and Jahnu Barua's Har Pal were shelved. Ram Gopal Varma's much discussed Shabri - struggled to attract a distributor.

Koppikar's high-profile film of 2007, Nikhil Advani's Salaam-e-Ishq, had her sharing limited screen time with Sohail Khan. Later in the year came the haunted love triangle, Ram Gopal Varma's Darling, with Fardeen Khan and Esha Deol. Koppikar's first film release of 2008 was Atul Agnihotri's Hello, based on the best-selling novel One Night @ the Call Center by Chetan Bhagat. This was followed by Ek Vivaah... Aisa Bhi, a Rajshri Production directed by Kaushik Ghatak and co-starring Sonu Sood.

Koppikar married Timmy Narang in 2009. She had two releases in 2010: Right Yaaa Wrong by Neeraj Pathak and Manoj Tiwari's Hello Darling. Both films fared poorly at the box office.

Shabri, where she played a woman gangster of Mumbai, was eventually released in 2011. Her performance was praised but the film only had a limited release and failed to make an impact at the box office.

=== Secondary roles (2013–present) ===
In 2013, she made her Marathi debut in Maat, directed by Manohar Sarvankar. In 2017, she makes her comeback in Telugu with Keshava followed by the Marathi film, FU: Friendship Unlimited. The following year, she is seen in the Kannada films, Looty and Kavacha. She made her digital debut with the ALTBalaji web series titled Fixerr (2019) where she plays the role of sub-inspector Jayanti Javdekar, who lives in a modest house with her young son and husband. Later, she was also seen in the crime thriller series Dahanam (2022). She also acted in the thriller web series Suranga (2022) with Rakesh Bedi and Fredy Daruwala, co-produced by Kaushik Izardar and others. Isha Koppikar, who is returning to Tamil cinema after two decades, will be seen playing an assassin in Sivakarthikeyan's science-fiction film Ayalaan (2024).

== Political career ==
In 2019, she joined the Bharatiya Janata Party in the presence of Union minister Nitin Gadkari. She has been appointed as the working president of the BJP's women transport wing.

== Other works ==
Between filming Koppikar, like many Bollywood actors, performs in stage music shows. In addition to this she has appeared in two music videos: Patli Kamar by KK for a private album commissioned by Sony in 2001/2002; and Bandish Projekt's Bhor (Satyam Shivam Sundaram) in 2004, choreographed by Bosco-Caesar. In 2006 she appeared onstage in the Indian Idol Grand Final to dance with the two finalists, and 2007 saw her as one of three judges in the celebrity dance competition Nach Baliye 3, alongside director David Dhawan and Vaibhavi Merchant. She had also owned a restaurant back in 2015. She served as a judge in the Miss Universe 2008 contest, held on 14 July in Vietnam alongside, amongst others, fashion designer Roberto Cavalli and former winner in 2004 Jennifer Hawkins. In August 2009, she presented the new Colors wrestling show 100% De Dana Dan.

She continues to model for fashion designers Anita Dongre and Pria Kataria Puri. In 2007, she became the Indian brand ambassador of the Italian fashion company Police Time and Jewellery. Koppikar is also a spokesperson for the animal rights organisation PETA and received the 10th Anniversary Humanitarian Award in December 2009.

== Personal life ==
Koppikar has a black-belt in Taekwondo.

Following the advice of numerologists, she has changed the spelling of her name twice, first to Ishaa Koppikar and later to Eesha Koppikhar. However, as of 2015 she has reverted to the original spelling of her name.

Isha married Timmy Narang, a businessman, on 29 November 2009 and has a daughter. However they were divorced on 29 November 2023.

== Filmography ==
Key
†	Denotes films that have not yet been released

=== Films ===
Years	Title	Role	Language	Notes
1997	W/o V. Vara Prasad	Song and dance	Telugu	Special appearance
1998	Chandralekha	Lekha	Telugu	Telugu debut
1998	Kaadhal Kavithai	Jothi	Tamil	Tamil debut
1999	En Swasa Kaatre	Madhu	Tamil	
1999	Nenjinile	Nisha	Tamil	
1999	Jodi	Prospective bride	Tamil	Guest appearance
1999	Surya Vamsha	Padma	Kannada	Kannada debut
2000	O Nanna Nalle	Rangu	Kannada	
2000	Fiza	Gitanjali	Hindi	Hindi debut
2001	Prematho Raa	Swetha	Telugu	
2001	Hoo Anthiya Uhoo Anthiya	Usha	Kannada	
2001	Narasimha	Vaanathi	Tamil	
2001	Rahul	Song and dance	Hindi	Special appearance
2001	Pyaar Ishq Aur Mohabbat	Rubaina Alam	Hindi	
2001	Aamdani Atthanni Kharcha Rupaiya	Anjali	Hindi	
2002	Company	Dance number	Hindi	Special appearance
2002	Kaante	Dance number	Hindi	Special appearance
2003	Pinjar	Rajjo	Hindi	
2003	Dil Ka Rishta	Anita	Hindi	
2003	Qayamat: City Under Threat	Laila	Hindi	
2003	Darna Mana Hai	Abhilasha	Hindi	Segment: Stop-Move
2003	LOC Kargil	Santho	Hindi	
2003	Tujhe Meri Kasam	Dance number	Hindi	Special appearance
2004	Rudraksh	Lali	Hindi	
2004	Krishna Cottage	Disha	Hindi	
2004	Hum Tum	Diana Fernandez	Hindi	special appearance
2004	Girlfriend	Tanya Singh	Hindi	
2004	Ek Se Badhkar Ek	Tracy D'Souza/Shalini Mathur	Hindi	
2004	Inteqam: The Perfect Game	Avantika Suryavanshi/Pinky Khanna	Hindi	
2005	Kyaa Kool Hai Hum	Urmila Matondkar	Hindi	
2005	D	Gunjan	Hindi	
2005	Maine Pyaar Kyun Kiya?	Nishika	Hindi	
2006	Darna Zaroori Hai	Abhilasha	Hindi	Sequel of Darna Mana Hai
2006	36 China Town	Sonia Chang	Hindi	
2006	Don	Anita	Hindi	
2006	Haseena	Haseena	Hindi	
2007	Salaam-e-Ishq: A Tribute to Love	Phoolwati	Hindi	
2007	Darling	Ashwini	Hindi	
2008	Hello	Esha	Hindi	
2008	Ek Vivaah... Aisa Bhi	Chandini Srivastava Ajmera	Hindi	
2010	Right Yaaa Wrong	Anshita	Hindi	
2010	Hello Darling	Satvati Chaudary	Hindi	
2011	Shabri	Shabri	Hindi	
2013	Maat	Reema Deshmukh	Marathi	Marathi debut
2017	Keshava	Sharmila Mishra	Telugu	
2017	FU: Friendship Unlimited	Sheena Mam	Marathi	
2018	Looty	ACP Durga Bhavani	Kannada	
2019	Kavacha	Gowri	Kannada	
2022	Love You Loktantra	Gulabi Didi	Hindi	
2024	Ayalaan	Eliza	Tamil	

=== Web series ===
Year	Title	Role	Platform	Ref(s)
2019	Fixerr	Jayanti Jaydev	Alt Balaji and ZEE5	
2022	Dhahanam	Anjana Sinha	MX Player	
2022	Suranga	Dakshyani	Atrangi	

=== Music video appearances ===
Year	Album	Song	Singer
2002	Bandish Projekt	"Bhor Remix"	Bandish Projekt
2004	Sweet Honey Mix	"Bhor Remix"	Smita

== Awards and nominations ==
List of acting awards and nominations
Year	Film	Award	Category	Result
1998	Kadhal Kavithai	Filmfare Awards South	Best Female Debut – South	Won
1999	Chandrodaya	Filmfare Awards South	Best Female Actress – South	Won
2004	Dil Ka Rishta	Asian Network Film Awards	Best Supporting Actress	Nominated
2004	Qayamat: City Under Threat	Filmfare Awards	Best Villain	Won
2005	Kyaa Kool Hai Hum	Annual Central European Bollywood Awards	Best Supporting Actress	Nominated
2006	Kyaa Kool Hai Hum	Zee Cine Awards	Best Actor in a Comic Role	Nominated
2006	Kyaa Kool Hai Hum	IIFA Awards	Best Performance in a Comic Role	Nominated
2006	Kyaa Kool Hai Hum	Screen Awards	Best Comedian	Nominated
