= Gayab =

- Directed by: Prawaal Raman
- Screenplay by: Prawaal Raman; Kona Venkat
- Dialogues by: Prawaal Raman; Kona Venkat
- Story by: Suresh Nair; Prawaal Raman; Kona Venkat
- Produced by: Ram Gopal Varma
- Starring: Tushar Kapoor; Antara Mali
- Cinematography: Piettro Zuercher
- Edited by: Amit Parmar; Nipun Gupta
- Music by: Songs: Ajay–Atul; Background Score: Amar Mohile
- Production company: RGV Factory
- Distributed by: Prime Focus Ltd
- Release date: 16 July 2004
- Running time: 156 minutes
- Country: India
- Language: Hindi

Gayab (English: Disappeared) is a 2004 Indian Hindi-language supernatural black comedy film directed by Prawaal Raman and produced by Ram Gopal Varma. It stars Tusshar Kapoor and Antara Mali. The film was declared below average at the box office. It was simultaneously shot in Tamil as Jithan, which had a delayed release in 2005.

== Plot ==
Vishnu Prasad is an unappreciated nerd. His mother nags him, and his father ignores him. He is in love with his neighbour Mohini, but she already has a boyfriend, Sameer. Vishnu sees Mohini in a cafe with Sameer. As Sameer goes to get drinks, Mohini's eyes meet Vishnu's. A shy and nervous Vishnu accidentally winks at Mohini, which angers Sameer into hitting him. Vishnu bursts into tears. Sad and depressed from his life, he goes to a beach.

Angry at God for the life he has given him, Vishnu asks the statue to make him disappear from the world as no one likes him. When he reaches home, he discovers that God took his wish literally and turned him invisible. Excited and happy, Vishnu gets many opportunities to spy on Mohini and get her boyfriend in trouble. He realises that he cannot wear any other clothes than the ones he was wearing on the day he received the boon because those were the only clothes that turned invisible with him realizing that it will show his invisible body with his other clothes on, so he quickly finds his white shirt which is invisible and puts it on before he gets caught. When Vishnu sees his father is worried about him and also because of a nagging wife, he tells his father about his secret and calms him down. He plays the role of an invisible ghost to teach his mother a lesson. His mother gets scared thinking that the ghost is of her late father-in-law and faints. Vishnu thinks that he needs money to impress Mohini. So, he robs a bank and brings her all the cash, but Mohini is shocked and terrified. Vishnu decides to tell her everything. Mohini flies in a rage and tells Vishnu to leave her alone as she is in love with Sameer.

Alone and heartbroken, Vishnu gets drunk and wanders the streets. The media makes up incredible stories after the bank robbery done by an "invisible force," and they try to get more information. The police department takes action and tries to hunt down the "invisible man". Sameer decides to leave town with Mohini before Vishnu comes back looking for them again, but they are unable to do so. So they go into hiding, and Vishnu demands that the police bring him Mohini, or else he will wreak havoc throughout the city.

He also threatens them by comically disturbing the streets and a portion of the city taxi by taxi (such as a restaurant, marathon race and politics). The police find Mohini and plead with her to help them find and kill Vishnu before he becomes an invisible murderer and a threat to the whole nation. Mohini agrees to help in their mission and goes to an abandoned building to meet Vishnu, as demanded by him. As Mohini diverts Vishnu's attention by involving him in a conversation, the cops surround the place to capture him. Vishnu tells Mohini that he has been wrong all along and that he has always loved her. He tells her that he has realised that loving her doesn't mean that he has control over her life. Mohini is struck by his words and realises that he is not a bad person.

She decides to save his life and tells him to run away as the cops are already in the building. Vishnu runs for his life and dives into a river as the cops shoot him. Minutes later, Vishnu's clothes (now visible and soaking wet) are the only things to surface. But his body is not found. Vishnu is presumed dead by the police and media. A few days later, Sameer and Mohini find Vishnu again on the side of the same river in which he supposedly drowned. Vishnu (now naked after escaping from the river) apologizes to them for whatever wrong he did and decides to lead a normal life. Vishnu is arrested and faces trial. Guilty of his acts, he spends a short time in jail and is later released. Many months later, Vishnu (now with his different clothes on) is recognised by the nation as a hero, and he has helped the police solve several cases while still leading an invisible but normal life.

== Cast ==
- Tusshar Kapoor as Vishnu Prasad
- Antara Mali as Mohini
- Raman Trikha as Sameer
- Raghuveer Yadav as Balwantrai, Vishnu's father
- Rasika Joshi as Shanti Devi, Vishnu's mother
- Govind Namdeo as DCP Rane
- Ikhlaq Khan as Sanjay Khanna
- Natasha Sinha as Gayatri
- Anil Mahtre as Inspector
- Hayat Asif as Doctor
- Rajendra Sethi as Home Minister
- Raj Arjun as Drunken Guy

== Production ==
Suresh Nair of The Times of India further developed the "Stop" story of Darna Mana Hai, which was also directed by Prawaal Raman and produced by Ram Gopal Varma. Kona Venkat and Raman additionally worked as writers for the story, which became Gayab. To create Tusshar Kapoor's character of an invisible man, he wore a green bodysuit underneath his clothes. Through the use of a software, his body was removed but his clothes remained. While in production the film became a multilingual film with Ram Gopal Varma producing the Hindi and Telugu versions while Radhika Sarathkumar produced the Tamil version titled Jithan. The Telugu version was dropped in favour of a simultaneous dubbed release titled Mayam.

== Soundtrack ==
Gayab

Soundtrack album by Ajay–Atul
- Released: April 2004
- Genre: Film soundtrack
- Length: 33:40
- Label: Times Music

Track list
No.	Title	Singer(s)	Length
1.	"Gayab Hoke"	Kunal Ganjawala	5:14
2.	"Tanha"	Sonu Nigam	6:03
3.	"Dilkash"	Shweta Pandit, Kunal Ganjawala	5:28
4.	"Main Love Tumse"	Vinod Rathod	4:21
5.	"Superman"	Sunidhi Chauhan, Kunal Ganjawala	3:55
6.	"Rampage Notes"	Instrumental	3:07
7.	"Ek Hasina Thi" (remix)	Zubeen Garg, Dominique	5:32
Total length:			33:40

== Reception ==
The film was released to negative reviews.

Sukanya Verma of Rediff.com wrote, "All said and done, Gayab offers 15 reels of invisible entertainment". Taran Adarsh of Bollywood Hungama rated the film 1.5/5 and wrote that "On the whole, GAYAB is strong on hype, but weak in content. The USP of the film is the invisible factor in the story, but an amateur screenplay ruins the show". Anupama Chopra of India Today wrote that "the script, performances and pacing don't match up. Like his first film, Darna Mana Hai, Gayab is a high-concept film that runs out of steam".
