= Shabri =

- Shabri promotion poster
- Directed by: Lalit Marathe
- Written by: Lalit Marathe
- Screenplay by: Lalit Marathe
- Story by: Lalit Marathe
- Produced by: vuyyala Vinay Anku Pande (Executive Producer)
- Starring: Isha Koppikar
- Cinematography: Amit Roy
- Edited by: Avinash Walzade
- Music by: Raju Singh
- Distributed by: Reliance Entertainment
- Release date: 26 August 2011
- Country: India
- Language: Hindi

Shabri is a 2011 Indian Hindi-language action film directed by Lalit Marathe and produced by Ram Gopal Varma. It is about a woman, played by Ishaa Koppikar, who becomes the first female crime lady in Mumbai. The film was completed in 2005 and was showcased as the opening film at the Rome Film Festival, and was also premiered at the New York Asian Film Festival. The film was officially released worldwide on 26 August 2011.

== Plot ==
The film starts with the accidental death of Kisnya (the younger brother of the villain), who insists that Shabri be handed over to the police for the murder of Inspector Khare, which Murad (a friendly neighbor of the Shabri family who is a bookie) forcefully opposes. Shabri is guilty of the murder of a wicked police inspector (Khare) who tried to rape her in a police station in front of her younger brother, who has already been tortured by Khare. After killing Kisnya, Murad and Shabri (now both murderers) run away from Mumbai to a farmhouse uptown but are nevertheless traced by Rajdar Bhau's gang (who is even helped by a corrupt officer named Inspector Kadam). There is a shootout. Murad gets shot and is captured by the gang (he is later put to death with two dozen bullets by an angry Rajdhar Bhau, who wants to avenge Kisnya's death). Shabri is taken to Kadam's flat, where the drunk officer tries to rape her, but Shabri somehow manages to run away after shooting Kadam in the foot and breaking a bottle of beer on his head.

Now another friend of the late Murad, namely Vilas, helps her. Here an interesting character, Irfan Kazi, enters the story, interesting because it is not possible to make out if he is good or evil. Nevertheless, he is an encounter cop who is fed up with killing criminals and wishes to do something more creative for his entertainment. He does this by giving Shabri inside know-how of Rajdar Bhau's gang, which is unknown to the egotist Rajdar. Almost everyone, by now fed up with the selfishness of their boss, is standing on the brink of rebellion. In the climax, Shabri at last comes face to face with Rajdar Bhau, and he is shocked to learn that Shabri is not there to beg for mercy but to kill him. Each gangster standing around them is now a friend of Shabri and ready to kill Rajdar at her signal; their guns are pointed at Rajdar Bhau (using her leadership qualities and Kazi's contacts, she has convinced all of them that their future and well-being are now in getting rid of Rajdar Bhau and reorganizing under Shabri's being their chief, under whom they will all work as equal partners). Rajdar Bhau, with Shabri's approval, shoots himself.

== Cast ==
- Isha Koppikar as Shabri
- Manish Wadhwa as Vilas
- Pradeep Rawat as Rajdhar Bhau
- Raj Arjun as Murad
- Zakir Hussain as Inspector Irfan Qazi
- Vijay Kadechkar as Bandya
- Sanjay Kulkarni as Inspector Kadam
- Datta Sonawane as Inspector Khare
- Niraj Kumar as Kisnya Bhau
- Parvez Khan as Rahuu
- Mohit Dwivedi as Arjun
- Anshul Joshi as Ram
- Vimal Mhatre as Shabri's mother
- Kishore Nandlaskar as Shabri's father
- Ragesh Asthana as Shardool Seth
- Chandan Pethkar as Nana
- Archana Thavre as Mrs. Khare
- Pravisht Mishra as Khare's son
- Urmila Matondkar in archived footage of Ek Hasina Thi, in the background of a scene

== Trivia ==
- Ishaa Koppikar's make-up was so convincing that security and producers wouldn't let her enter the set, as they didn't recognize her.
