= Main Madhuri Dixit Banna Chahti Hoon =

- Directed by: Chandan Arora
- Screenplay by: Mushi Ali
- Story by: Makrand Deshpande
- Produced by: Ram Gopal Varma
- Starring: Antara Mali; Rajpal Yadav; Seema Shinde
- Cinematography: Sanu Varghese (credited as Sanu John Varughese)
- Edited by: Amit Pawar
- Music by: Amar Mohile
- Production companies: Varma Corporation Limited; Entertainment One
- Release date: October 17, 2003
- Country: India
- Language: Hindi

Main Madhuri Dixit Banna Chahti Hoon (transl. I Want To Be Madhuri Dixit) is a 2003 Indian Hindi-language comedy-drama film directed by Chandan Arora and produced by Ram Gopal Varma. The story follows a poor, uneducated woman (Antara Mali) who is a huge fan of famous Bollywood actress, Madhuri Dixit. to the extent that she aspires to become the new Madhuri Dixit by attempting to join the Bollywood film industry. The film was shot in Mumbai, India.

In keeping with the story line, the costume designer (Reza Shariffi) created outfits for the lead character, Chhutki, which won him a nomination for the Zee Cine Award 2004 for Best Costume Design.

== Plot ==
Chutki is an enormous fan of Bollywood film star Madhuri Dixit and pines for the chance to follow in her idol's footsteps. As she makes her wishes known to her parents, she learns that her parents have other plans for her that include an arranged marriage. Chutki's best friend Raja shares her dreams and offers to marry her so that they can work on Chutki's acting career. As soon as the two small-town innocents arrive in Mumbai, they learn serious lessons about the hardships of the profession and discover the numerous wannabes in direct competition with Chutki.

== Cast ==
- Antara Mali as Chutki
- Rajpal Yadav as Raja
- Govind Namdeo
- Seema Shinde
- Raman Trikha
- Sudhir Pandey
- Reeta Bhaduri
- Benjamin Gilani
- Vandana Sajnani

== Music ==
1. "Tu Ban Jayegi Madhuri" – Nitin Raikwar, Ritika Sahani
2. "Hai Tumse Mili Nazar" – Remix – Ritika Sahani, Sonu Nigam
3. "Tumse Mili Nazar To" – Sonu Nigam, Ritika Sahani
4. "Kaisi Hai Uljhan" – The Duplicates Song – Sudesh Bhosle, Shreya Ghoshal
5. "Phir Teree Makkhan Mallai" – Poornima
6. "Rumi Saab" – Mohit Chauhan

== Reception ==
Taran Adarsh of IndiaFM gave the two out of five, writing, "Post-interval, the story continues to move forward, but the pace drops at this juncture. Although the story moves on a singular track, somehow it does not measure up to the expectations raised by the first half." Namrata Joshi of Outlook gave the film two out of four, writing, "Sadly, the filmmaker doesn't try and recreate Mumbai as a hyper-real entity. Once Chutki arrives in the big city, reality steps into the cinematic frame and with it so do the cliches about it."

== See also ==
- Chala Murari Hero Banne, 1977 Hindi film about a small-town man aspiring to join Bollywood film industry.
