= Prawaal Raman =

Indian film director and screenwriter

- Occupation: Film director
- Years active: 2003-present

Prawaal Raman is an Indian film director and screenwriter known for his works in Hindi cinema. He has written and directed films like Darna Mana Hai (2003), Gayab (2004), Darna Zaroori hai (2006), 404 (2011) and Main Aur Charles (2015).

== Career ==
Raman started his career as an assistant director to Ram Gopal Varma and assisted him as second unit director in Jungle and Company. Post Company, Ram Gopal Varma assigned the project Darna Mana Hai to him as the director. The multi starrer film released in 2003 and was critically acclaimed. In 2015, Raman wrote and directed Main Aur Charles, starring Randeep Hooda, Richa Chadda and Adil Hussain. His next directorial film, Dr. Ajoy Kumar is in its pre-production phase. He has produced documentaries for Prayas, an NGO in New Delhi operating in more than seven states in India.

== Non film work ==
In 2012 Due to the increasing suicide amongst school students, Raman organised an anti-suicide campaign in Jamshedpur with Jeevan NGO and Loyola School which had a series of seminar. Guest speakers were Randeep Hooda, Rahul Bose, Sunita Menon, Nishikant Kamat, Satyakaam Gupta and Raman, himself.

He has been a guest speaker for leadership training program for Praxair, organized by Abacus Management Consultants Pvt. Ltd. New Delhi in 2012 where he spoke about mutual faith and trust within a corporate structure. He has also been a guest speaker along with Tisca Chopra at Masina Metro Hospital and spoke about how to deal with people suffering from bipolar disorder.

Raman has been honored by Sandeep Marwah with the life membership of International Film And Television Club of Asian Academy of Film & Television at Noida Film City.

== Filmography ==
Year	Film	Director	Writer	Notes
2003	Darna Mana Hai	Yes	Yes	Nominated, Stardust Best Debut Director Award
2004	Gayab	Yes	Yes	
2006	Darna Zaroori Hai	Yes	Yes	Story segment spirits do come
2007	Darling		Yes	
2011	404: Error Not Found	Yes	Yes	Nominated, Screen Award for Best Story
2015	Main Aur Charles	Yes	Yes	
2017	Dobaara: See Your Evil	Yes	Yes	Adapted From Oculus
2023	Sergeant	Yes	Yes	
