= Darna Mana Hai =

- Movie poster for Darna Mana Hai
- Directed by: Prawaal Raman
- Written by: Atul Sabharwal; Rajnish Thakur; Abbas Tyrewala
- Produced by: Ram Gopal Varma
- Starring: Nana Patekar; Vivek Oberoi; Saif Ali Khan; Boman Irani; Sanjay Kapoor; Shilpa Shetty; Sohail Khan; Antara Mali; Sameera Reddy; Rajpal Yadav; Aftab Shivdasani; Isha Koppikar; Peeya Rai Chowdhary; Revathi; Raghuvir Yadav; Gaurav Kapur; Kiku Sharda
- Cinematography: Vishal Sinha; Debpriya Dutta
- Music by: Salim–Sulaiman
- Distributed by: K Sera Sera Productions
- Release date: 25 July 2003
- Running time: 121 minutes
- Country: India
- Language: Hindi
- Budget: ₹4.50 crore
- Box office: ₹9 crore

Darna Mana Hai (English: Fear is forbidden) is a 2003 Indian Hindi-language anthology horror film. The film consists of six different short stories. It stars Nana Patekar, Vivek Oberoi, Aftab Shivdasani, Shilpa Shetty, Sameera Reddy, Isha Koppikar, Saif Ali Khan, and Sohail Khan, among many others. Upon release, it met with an extremely negative response. Despite the fact, it became a cult classic movie. Like previous Ram Gopal Varma film Bhoot, it did not feature the songs composed for it.

Later in 2006, Ram Gopal Varma, the producer, spawned Darna Zaroori Hai, a sequel with a different ensemble cast, six new cinematographers, and seven different directors. Only Rajpal Yadav and director Prawaal Raman were back from the previous installment. Darna Mana Hai has been dubbed and released in Telugu with the same title. It is loosely based on the 1997 film Campfire Tales.

== Plot ==
Darna Mana Hai consists of six stories in one film. Seven friends: Shruti, Suman, Romi, Mehnaaz, Neha, Amar, and Vikas are on a road trip when they get a flat tyre. They spot a house in the distance. Vikas stays in the car. The others find the house in ruins but with signs that someone lives there. They set a bonfire and tell stories of the supernatural.

Story 1 — On The Way

Married couple Karan and Anjali are driving on a forest road. When their car suddenly stops, Karan gets out to investigate. He disappears and his cry for help makes Anjali run to rescue him. She thinks it's a prank until she finds Karan's flashlight covered in blood. She sees a hand reaching out of a swamp wearing Karan's watch and she tries to rescue him. After he sinks, someone creeps up on Anjali as she screams. It is Karan, completely normal and fine. He says he heard her screams when he went to find water. He's holding the flashlight, which is clean, and Anjali thinks she was hallucinating. After fixing the car, they drive off. Karan puts his arm around her as she leans on him and closes her eyes. He smirks into the rearview mirror in which he has no reflection, and Anjali is leaning on nothing.

Neha, frightened, asks Romi to walk her back to the car. He refuses because he doesn't want to see Vikas. She leaves by herself.

Story 2 — No Smoking

Photographer Anil checks into an inn. The owner insists that smoking is strongly prohibited. Anil tries to reason with him to let him smoke but is reminded of the diseases associated with smoking. When he tries to leave the owner locks him inside and pulls a gun, saying he can cure his addiction in six months. He says that he has cured 70% of people from smoking, and murdered the other 30%. He shows him piles of corpses in the basement. After six months, Anil, now clean shaven, is working at the lodge. When a client walks in smoking and asks him for a room, Anil tells him that smoking is strongly prohibited. The customer contemptuously blows smoke in Anil's face, and Anil shoots him dead as the owner laughs. Anil and the owner sit together, enjoying a Tom and Jerry show on television and watching an anti-smoking commercial.

Suman thinks he saw someone in the forest. The group dismisses it as either him being scared or attempting to scare the others. Mehnaaz goes back to the car to retrieve a blanket, declining Romi's offer to accompany her. As she leaves, Neha's body is shown lying in the forest. Mehnaaz is chased and stabbed by an unseen assailant. Back at the bonfire, Amar thinks he heard Mehnaaz scream but his concern is dismissed by the group.

Story 3 — Homework

School teacher Dayashankar Pandey confronts student Pramila for repeatedly not completing her homework. Pramila produces her homework, which elicits a strange reaction from Pandey. The incident repeats every day, making Pandey increasingly anxious. Upon the suggestion of a coworker that she might be receiving help, Pandey calls upon Pramila's mother, who denies helping her daughter. He asks about the Om sign that Pramila draws on every page of her homework. The mother shrugs it off. Later, Pandey goes to Pramila's house again and tells Pramila's mother that he had had an intelligent friend, Varun, who died falling off a building while they were a flying kite together (in fact, he had jealously pushed Varun) and that he thinks Pramila is a reincarnation of Varun. He says Varun used to draw the Om sign just as Pramila does now. He realises that he sounds mad and leaves apologising. On the way home, Varun's spirit warns him, "You are not insane yet. But you will be." The following morning, Pandey has lost his sanity, scribbling basic mathematics on the busy road.

Amar, worried about the girls who left, goes to look for them alone. He finds Vikas alone in the car, dead with a slash wound on his neck. Amar runs back towards the others but is confronted in the forest.

Story 4 — Cursed Apples

Housewife Gayatri comes across a market vendor selling apples for Rs. 20 while everyone else's are Rs. 60. She buys the apples but his demeanour unsettles her. At home, she throws the apples away, but they reappear in the fridge. Her husband Sanjay eats one while watching a cricket match on TV, and finds it very tasty. Gayatri worries that something bad might happen to Sanjay. When Gayatri awakes the next morning, she finds an apple next to her instead of her husband. She runs to inform the police but they have become apples as well. Slowly everyone on the street turns into apples after eating them. The apple vendor appears, offering Gayatri his last apple for free.

Story 5 — Ghostly Lift

An elderly man, John Rodrigues, stands near a graveyard by the highway at night. Young driver Amar offers John a lift. Amar assumes John was there to visit his wife's grave, but John says that it is actually he who is dead. Amar dismisses it as a joke and plays along, asking John to vanish as proof. He becomes increasingly annoyed at John's insistence that he's not joking. John says Amar's anger indicates he is getting scared and apologises, and shakes hands before showing that he is bleeding from gunshot wounds and gets blood on Amar. Amar is fed up and stops the car to physically remove John. John reveals that he is filming for a prank show, and shows Amar his hidden camera. He says Amar is the first person to not be scared by the prank and asks how he remained unnerved. Amar says he knew John was not a ghost because he is a ghost himself. Amar removes his sunglasses to reveal hollow eye sockets, before vanishing. John dies in shock as the film crew arrives.

The group wonders where the others are. Suman suggests they go together to check but Romi insists on going by himself. Shruti and Suman chat until a man joins them at the bonfire. He claims to live there and asks to hear a story.

Story 6 — Stop/Move

Student Purab has unrequited feelings for Abhilasha, but is a social pariah. He contemplates suicide by slitting his wrist, but is interrupted by his father. He vents in front of an idol, the idol blinks a light and Purab leaves for college. He discovers he can immobilise a person just by saying "Stop!" and he realises the idol gave him the power. He freezes Abhilasha, then demonstrates it to her by immobilising a number of students in their college. Frightened by Purab's power, Abhilasha agrees to date him. Purab returns home dancing victoriously with megalomaniac fantasies. Purab accidentally immobilises himself while saying "stop" in the mirror. His parents find him with a smile frozen on his face, they shake him but he does not reply. Abhilasha, looking from her window, sees Purab rushed to the hospital.

The Ending

The newcomer tells the two friends it is his turn to tell a story.

Seven friends are travelling at night when their car breaks down. They shelter in a ruined shack and tell each other stories. After each story, one friend goes into the forest and is killed, until only two are left. The killer, now bored, comes to the two. Labelling himself a genius, the newcomer says he cannot stand fear as it blocks progress, and he would kill anyone who is scared. He tells Shruti and Suman that their friends are all dead.

The man senses the fear in Suman and fatally stabs him. He turns to commend Shruti for not being scared, but she has fled. He catches her and stabs her.

Shruti awakens at daybreak and finds the place swarming with police, and her friends' corpses being taken into ambulances. She sees the killer sitting on a car. She tries to tell the police that he is the murderer, but they ignore her. The killer points to a body, which she recognises to be her own. She realises that she is now a ghost, as the killer tells her there is nothing left to fear as everyone is dead, including himself. They are joined by the ghosts of her friends.

== Cast ==
- Nana Patekar as John Rodrigues
- Saif Ali Khan as Anil Manchandani
- Vivek Oberoi as Amar Vashisht
- Sanjay Kapoor as Sanjay Joshi, Gayatri's husband
- Sohail Khan as Karan Ahuja
- Shilpa Shetty as Gayatri Pandit
- Isha Koppikar as Abhilasha Malhotra
- Aftab Shivdasani as Purab Khandelwal
- Boman Irani as a hotel owner
- Sameera Reddy as Shruti Kapoor
- Gaurav Kapoor as Romi Yadav
- Antara Mali as Anjali Deshmukh, Karan's wife
- Raghuvir Yadav as Dayashankar Pandey (teacher)
- Anuj Pandit Sharma as Varun
- Revathi as Pramila's mother
- Rajpal Yadav as an apple vendor
- Sushant Singh as a serial killer
- Malavika as Neha Bhatia
- Rahul Singh as Dev Bohra
- Peeya Rai Chowdhary as Mehnaaz
- Kiku Sharda as Amar Varma, friend of Shruti
- Yusuf Hussain as Mr. Khandelwal: Purab's father

== Soundtrack ==
Darna Mana Hai: The Original Motion Picture Soundtrack

Soundtrack album by Salim–Sulaiman
- Released: 13 June 2003
- Genre: Feature film soundtrack
- Length: min
- Label: ZEE Records
- Producer: Salim–Sulaiman

Salim–Sulaiman chronology
Bhoot (2003)	Darna Mana Hai: The Original Motion Picture Soundtrack (2003)	Kaal (2005)

The soundtrack features 6 songs composed by Salim–Sulaiman, with lyrics by Lalit Marathe.

Track listing:

1. "Darna Mana Hai" (4:20) – Sunidhi Chauhan, Ninad Kamat, Naresh Kamat
2. "Darna Mana Hai Remix" (4:15) – Sunidhi Chauhan, Ninad Kamat, Naresh Kamat
3. "Homework" (5:11) – Clinton Cerejo, Aparna Jha, Vijay
4. "Jo Dar Gaya Voh Mar Gaya" (4:45) – Sunidhi Chauhan, Salim Merchant, Naresh Kamat
5. "No Smoking" (4:56) – Ravi Khote
6. "Stop" (4:27) – Sonu Nigam, Sunidhi Chauhan

== Box office and reception ==
Taran Adarsh wrote, "The USPs of Darna Mana Hai are the sound quality and the scary moments that have been injected in the stories. Also, the length of most stories is concise, so boredom does not set in at all", concluding, "On the whole, Darna Mana Hai caters to the intelligentsia more than the average cinegoer of today, who may find the concept of the film difficult to digest".

The "Stop" segment was further developed into a feature film titled Gayab (2004) by Suresh Nair of The Times of India, Kona Venkat and Raman.
