= Antara Mali =

Indian actress

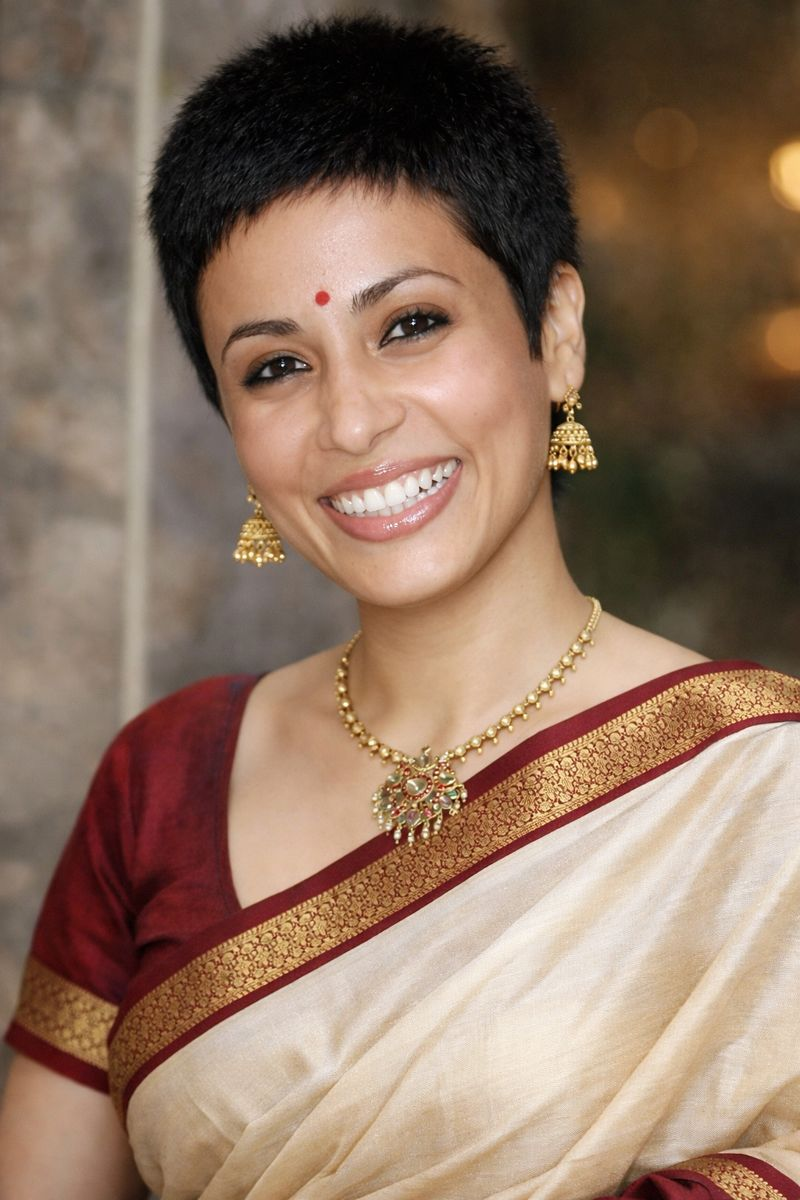
- Mali at wedding function in 2026
- Born: 11 May 1979 (age 47); Mumbai, Maharashtra, India
- Occupation: Actress
- Years active: 1998–2005, 2010
- Spouse: Che Kurrien (m. 2009)
- Children: 1
- Family: Jagdish Mali (Father)

Antara Mali is a former Indian actress, director, and screenwriter, who predominantly worked in Hindi films, and has also acted in a Malayalam and Telugu films.

== Early and personal life ==
Antara Mali was born in Mumbai to a well known Indian photographer Jagdish Mali. She is married to Che Kurrien, the editor of GQ magazine since 12 June 2009.

Mali's father had a history of diabetes and other illnesses. On being contacted after he was reported found disoriented in the streets, Antara Mali claimed that she was not in a position to take responsibility for her parent as she was soon to become a mother.

Mali gave birth to a baby girl at the Breach Candy Hospital in Mumbai and refuses to share her personal life in public.

== Career ==
Antara Mali made her acting debut in the 1998 film Dhoondte Reh Jaaoge!. The film, however, flopped. The next year was released her film Prema Katha directed by Ram Gopal Varma. Afterwards, Varma became Mali's frequent collaborator appearing in several of his films such as Mast (1999), Road (2002), Company (2002) and Darna Mana Hai (2003). Although Mali's performances were praised by critics, most of them did not do well at the box office. Mali paid her tribute to Madhuri Dixit by playing an aspiring actress inspired by Madhuri in the 2003 film Main Madhuri Dixit Banna Chahti Hoon. She received a Filmfare nomination for the Best Actress in a Supporting Role for Company.

She discontinued her acting career in 2005 after her last film Mr Ya Miss (which she had also written and directed) was received poorly and critically panned.

In 2010, she made a comeback to films with ...And Once Again, directed by Amol Palekar, but has not been active in films since then.

== Filmography ==
=== Actor ===
Year	Film	Role	Language	Notes
1998	Dhoondte Reh Jaaoge!	Renu	Hindi	Debut film
1999	Prema Katha	Divya	Telugu	Nominated-Filmfare Award for Best Actress – Telugu
1999	Mast	Nisha	Hindi	
2000	Ayyappantamma Neyyappam Chuttu	Latha	Malayalam	
2000	Khiladi 420	Monica D'Souza Chaudhary	Hindi	
2001	Urf Professor	Bindiya Chamkegi Choodi Khankegi / Maya Kapoor	Hindi	
2002	Company	Kannu	Hindi	Nominated - Filmfare Award for Best Supporting Actress
2002	Road	Lakshmikant	Hindi	
2003	Darna Mana Hai	Anjali Deshmukh	Hindi	Story segment: On The Way
2003	Main Madhuri Dixit Banna Chahti Hoon	Chutki	Hindi	Nominated - Zee Cine Award for Best Actress
2004	Gayab	Mohini	Hindi	
2004	Naach	Rewati	Hindi	
2005	Mr Ya Miss	Sanjana Patel	Hindi	Also director and writer
2010	...And Once Again	Savitri	Hindi	
