= Vinay Varma =

Indian actor

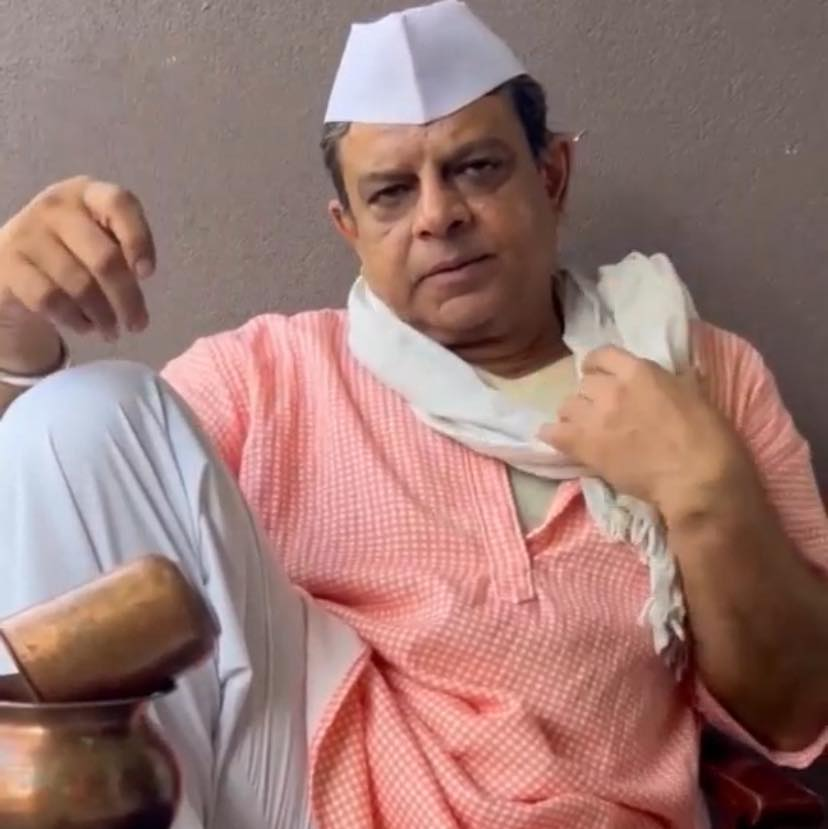
- Born: Hyderabad, India
- Occupations: Theatre practitioner, actor, scriptwriter, casting director
- Website: www.vinayvarma.in

Vinay Varma is an Indian theatre practitioner, actor, scriptwriter, and casting director. Straddling stage and screen, he has acted in and directed over 45 plays, while his career includes films mostly in Telugu and Hindi. His work further extends to the digital and television space, with roles in series such as Qubool Hai? and A Simple Murder.

== Early life and career ==
Born in Hyderabad to academic scholar Dr. Anand Raj Varma, he grew up with the ambition of becoming a physician. When he failed to fulfil this dream, he turned towards the humanities. Over the years, he worked as a lecturer, news reporter, administrator, and translator before resigning from his banking career in the early 2000s to pursue theatre.

Over the decades, he has directed 45+ plays, acted in more than 50, and performed in 200 productions across India and abroad. Some of his well-known performances include Natasamrat, Raktbeej, Main Rahi Masoom, Siyaah Haashiye, Stronger Than Superman, Main Nathuram Godse, Death Watch, Kanjoos Makkhi Choose, David Mamet's Oleanna. His play Main Rahi Masoom is based on the life of writer Dr Rahi Masoom Raza. Besides Hyderabad, Main Rahi Masoom has been performed in Kala Ghoda Arts Festival – Mumbai, 3rd Minerva National Theatre Festival – Kolkata, Pratyay Theatre Festival – Kolhapur, 12th Bharath Rang Mahotsav – New Delhi, 22nd National Drama Festival – Allahabad, 8th World Theatre Olympics-Chandigarh, Film and Television Institute of India-Pune. It was also performed in Chennai, Ahmedabad, Indore, Bengaluru etc. Vinay Varma was also invited by the Society of Friends International, London, to stage Main Rahi Masoom. On 2 March 2018, Main Rahi Masoom celebrated its 50th show, at Ravindra Bharathi, Hyderabad, India. He directed Sutradhar's debut Marathi play, Passwala. It premiered on World Theatre Day 2024 in Hyderabad. Passwala brings to life Jayant Pawar's (senior journalist & playwright) dialogue with a crematorium keeper in Worli, Mumbai.

Varma has been conducting Acting, Voice, Audition, and Body Language Workshops at Sutradhar since 1999 and has identified and trained more than 300 talents. Actors trained by him include Vijay Varma, Sree Vishnu, Aditi Sharma (Ahana of Kasam Tere Pyaar Ki), Vijay Deverakonda, Anand Deverakonda, and Aberaam Varma.

== Filmography ==
=== Telugu films ===
Year	Title	Role	Notes
2000	Love	Pakistani terrorist	
2002	Nee Thodu Kavali	Manasa's father	
2004	Tapana	Siddhu's father	
2005	Danger	Tantrik	
2006	Veedhi	Sivanna	
2009	Ninnu Kalisaka	Deepti's father	
2012	Nippu	Police Commissioner of Dubai	
2012	Ko Antey Koti	Inspector Ranjit Kumar	
2012	Dream	Doctor	
2014	Anaamika	DCP Ravi Chandra	Bilingual film
2016	Gentleman	David	
2016	Terror	DCP V. Rathod	
2016	Zindagi	Interrogating cop	
2018	Aravinda Sametha Veera Raghava	Timma Reddy	
2018	Idam Jagath	Police Commissioner Vikram Simha	
2019	Evaru	Banerjee	
2019	George Reddy	Minister Ramayya	
2019	Meeku Maathrame Cheptha	Uncle	
2019	Dorasaani	Raja Reddy	
2019	Boy	Nagendra	
2020	V	Saadik Haasan	
2020	IIT Krishnamurthy	ACP Vinay Varma	
2021	Zombie Reddy	Bhooma Reddy	
2021	Naandhi	Nagendra	
2021	Aakashavaani	Dora	
2021	Drushyam 2	CI J. Prathap	
2023	Waltair Veerayya	Police SP	
2023	Meter	DGP Dileep Raavath	
2023	Music School	Govind Rao Bhaskar Rao Kulkarni	Also co-wrote dialogue and casting director
2023	Aadikeshava	Vijay Mohan	
2024	Dhoom Dhaam	Narendra Bhoopathi	
2025	Kama and the Digital Sutras	Suryam	
2025	Artiste	Ravindra	
2025	Vrusshabha	Prakash	Partially reshot in Malayalam

=== Hindi films ===
Year	Title	Role	Notes
1999	Tu Hi Meri Ganga	Loknath	
2002	16 December	Home Minister Shiv Charan Shukla	
2004	Rudraksh	Mantrik	
2008	Mukhbiir	Ismail	
2010	Knock Out	Police Commissioner	
2011	Laadli Laila (Virgin Goat)	Butcher	
2014	Yeh Hai Bakrapur	Singhania	
2014	Bobby Jasoos	Tasawwur's father	
2022	Jersey	Major Krishna Rao	
2023	Music School	Govind Rao Bhaskar Rao Kulkarni	Also co-wrote dialogue and casting director
2024	Fighter	Debyajyoti Biswas "Debu"	

=== Other language films ===
Year	Title	Role	Language	Notes
2002	Beeper	Tiger	English	
2014	Nee Enge En Anbe	CI Ravi Chandra	Tamil	Bilingual film
2025	Test	Dharmesh Agarwal	Tamil	
2026	Jailer 2	Goan police officer	Tamil	

=== Web series ===
Year	Title	Role	Platform	Language	Ref.
2022	Qubool Hai?	Rafique Pehelwan	aha	Hyderabadi & Telugu	
2021	Game	Rana	Hotstar	Telugu	
2020	A Simple Murder	Pran Dawas	Sony Liv	Hindi	
2019	Sacred Games	National Security Advisor	Netflix	Hindi	

=== Television ===
Name	Language	Role	Notes
Bala	Urdu	Muazzam, the lecherous son of Aurangazeb	DD National.
Daanav Hunters	Hindi	Lankeshwar	Epic Channel
Dayasagar	Hindi	Judas Iscariot	DD National
Dharti Bane Phulwari	Hindi		DD National
Ek Kahani (Atmahatya); Ek Kahani (Narsayya ki Baodi)	Hindi	Chiranjeevi & bank loan broker respectively	Two Seasons - 1985 & 1989. On DD National.
Main Phir Janma Hoon	Hindi	Barabbas	Telefilm. DD National.
Madhavi	Telugu	Jaswant Rao, antagonist	DD National
Manushulu – Mamathalu	Telugu	Protagonist	DD National
Naghme ka Safar	Hindi	Doctor	DD National
Peter the Second	Hindi	Antagonist	Telefilm. DD National.
Shraddha	Hindi	Played a writer, husband of Rama Vij	DD National. Also wrote dialogues for all the episodes.

== Theatre ==
Latest Year of Performance	Play	Language	Actor/Director	Notes
2025	Passwala	Hindi	Actor/Director	Representation of Jayant Pawar’s conversation with a crematorium keeper
2025	Maha Periyava	Telugu	Director	Writer Hindu Ganesan. Episodes from the life of 68th Jagadguru Shankaracharya of Kanchi Kamakoti Peetham - Sri Chandrashekharendra Saraswati VIII, also known as Periyava.
2025	Ek Se Badhkar Ek	Hindi	Actor	Adapted from Sankaramanchi Parthasarathy's Abbey Em Ledu
2024	Ismat - Ek Aurat	Urdu/Hindi	Director	A collection of three short stories by Ismat Chughtai. Staged 15 shows so far.
2024	Passwala	Marathi	Director	Representation of Jayant Pawar’s conversation with a crematorium keeper
2023	Dushala	Hindi	Director	Writer Pritham K. Chakravarthy
2023	Raktbeej	Hindi	Actor/Director	Writer Dr. Shanker Shesh
2023	Jugger'Naatu'kam	Telugu	Director	Writer Srikant Sinker
2023	Weekend	Hindi	Director	Writer Nirmal Verma
2022	Dhuli Kanya Dushala	Bengali	Director	Writer Pritham K. Chakravarthy
2022	Main Rahi Masoom	Hindi/Urdu	Actor	Based on the life of Dr. Rahi Masoom Raza. Staged 65 shows so far.
2022	Aadhi Raat Ke Baad	Hindi	Director	Writer Dr. Shanker Shesh
2021	Abbey! Em Ledu	Telugu	Director	Writer Sankaramanchi Parthasarathy
2019	Oleanna	English	Actor	Writer David Mamet
2019	Andhere Mein	Hindi	Actor/Director	Partap Sehgal’s Indian adaptation of Peter Shaffer’s “Black Comedy”. Sponsored by the Ministry of Culture, Govt of India.
2019	White Rabbit Red Rabbit	Hindi	Actor	Writer Nassim Soleimanpour
2017	Sita Apaharan Case	Hindi	Actor/Director	Writer Dr. Prem Janmejay
2017	Mah Laqa Bai Chanda	Urdu/Hindi	Director	Writer Dr. Oudhesh Rani Bawa
2017	Bitter Chocolate	Hindi/English/Hyderabadi	Actor/Director	Based on Pinki Virani's book 'Bitter Chocolate'
2017	Siyaah Haashiye	Urdu	Actor/Director	Based on a collection of 40 short stories by Saadat Hasan Manto. Staged 13 shows so far.
2017	Kanjoos Makkhi Choose	Deccani/Hyderabadi	Actor/Director	Adaptation of Molière's The Miser
2017	Jaal – Dramatised play reading	Hindi	Actor/Director	Writer Annie Zaidi (writer)
2016	Maryada (a collection of two short plays: Touch & Sita Shoorpnakha)	Hindi	Co-director	Writer Shivani Tibrewala
2016	Kisi Aur ka Sapna	Hindi	Director	Writer Nand Kishore Acharya
2016	Pushp	Hindi	Actor	Hindi translation of Girish Karnad's play, Flower.
2015	Agnes of God	Hindi/English	Director	Writer John Pielmeier
2015	Out at Sea	Hindi	Actor/Director	Writer Slawomir Mrozek
2014	Post Mortem	Hindi	Director	Writer Milind Tikhe
2014	Aamne - Saamne	Hindi	Actor/Director	A collage of two short plays - "The Stronger" by August Strindberg, "Maranoparant" by Surendra Verma
2014	Birjees Qadar ka Kumba	Hindustani	Director	An adaptation of Federico Garcia Lorca’s The House of Bernarda Alba. Adapted and translated by Dr Raghuvir Sahay.
2014	Natasamrat	Hindi	Actor	Writer Kusumagraj
2012	Gadha Ya Aadmi	Hindi	Voice-over	Leather puppetry show
2012	Jungle Book	English	Actor	Directed by Vaishali Bisht
2011	Godse – An Assassin Speaks	Hindi/English	Actor/Co-Director	Nathuram Godse’s Monologue
2011	Isosceles Triangle	English	Actor/Director	Writer Dr. C.H. Phansalkar
2010	On Vacation	English	Actor/Director	Writer Sachin Kundalkar
2010	Voids, S p a c e s & Borders	Hindi	Director	An ensemble of 3 short performances Dramatic Space Writer: Theo Lesoualch; Kisi Seema Ki Ek Mamooli Si Ghatna, Writer Sagar Sarhadi; Avoid the Void, Writer Shivani Tibrewala
2009	Neem Hakim Khatar e Jaan	Hindi	Actor/Director	Adaptation of Molière’s The Doctor In Spite Of Himself (Le Médecin malgré lui)
2009	Four Dimensions	Hindi	Actor	A collage of four short plays: “Gandhaari”, pieces from Dharamvir Bharati’s “Andha Yug”, Benjamin Franklin’s “The Trial of Polly Baker”, Syed Junaidullah’s “Death of Poem”, Nathuram Godse’s Monologue “An Assassin Speaks”
2008	Kashmakash	A mix of languages: English, Hindi, Hyderabadi	Director/Actor	An organic play
2007	Uttararddha	Hindi	Director	Writer Vijay Mondkar, translated by Anant Kulkarni
2007	Shanivaar ke Do Baje	Hindi	Actor	Writer Surendra Verma
2006	Goodbye Swami	Hindi	Actor	Writer Susheel Kumar Singh
2006	Atmahatya ki Dukaan	Hindi	Director	Writer Asha Varma
2005	Kissa Karodimal Ki Laash Ka	Deccani/Hyderabadi	Director	Diwakar Babu’s Telugu play Kundeti Kommu. Adapted and translated by Anant Kulkarni.
2005	Andhon ka Haathi	Hindi	Director	Writer Sharad Joshi
2005	Room No 13 Block No 14	Hindi	Actor/Director	Writer Srikanth Sinkar
2004	Teen Apahij	Hindi	Director	Writer Vipin Agarwal
2004	Chakravyuha	Hindi	Director	Writer Rajesh Dhabre
2004	The Phoenix	Hindi	Director	Writer Abhijit Sircar
2002	Inspector Matadeen Chand Par	Hindi	Actor	Writer Harishankar Parsai
2002	Hay Mera Dil	Hindi	Actor/Director	Writer Ranbir Singh
2002	Deathwatch	Hindi	Actor	
2001	Prastaav	Hindi	Actor/Director	Anton Chekhov’s “The Proposal” adapted in Hindi by Anant Kulkarni
2001	Budh Kaam Shudh	Hindi	Director	Writer I. S. Johar
2001	Aarop	Hindi	Actor	Writer Suresh Khare, adapted by Anant Kulkarni
2000	Saiyan Bhaye Kotwal	Hindi	Actor/Director	Adapted from the popular Marathi play Vichha Majhi Puri Kara by Vasant Sabnis
2000	Kisi ko toh Jaana Hoga	Hindi	Actor/Director	Based on Subhash Parkhi's Marathi play Kalpana, translated in Hindi by Anant Kulkarni
2000	Gandhi Ambedkar	Hindi	Actor/Co-Director	Writer Dr. Premanand Gajvi
1999	Raja ka Baaja	Hindi	Actor/Director	First workshop production. Writer Safdar Hashmi.
1996	Kaath ka Ghoda	Hindi	Actor	Writer Manoranjan Das
1995	Ballabhpur ki Roopkatha	Hindi	Actor/Director	Writer Badal Sarkar
1993	Phandi	Hindi	Actor/Director	Writer Dr. Shanker Shesh
1988	Langda Ghoda	Hindi	Actor	Writer Kadir Zaman
1988	Stronger Than Superman	Hindi	Actor	Written by Roy Kift, adapted by Anant Kulkarni
1987	Guddi Pappu aur Munna	Hindi	Actor	Based on Volker Ludwig’s Max und Milli, adapted by Anant Kulkarni
1986	Aage Daudo Peeche Chhodo	Hindi	Actor	Based on Baban Prabhu’s Marathi play, adapted by Anant Kulkarni
1985	Krapp ke Antim Shabd	Hindi	Actor	Based on Samuel Beckett’s "Krapp's Last Tapes", translated by Vijay Ahluwalia
1983	Five	English	Actor	Writer Shreekumar Varma
1982	Tambe ke Keede	Hindi	Actor	Writer Bhuvaneshwar Prasad
1982	Aage Aage Premchand, Peeche Peeche Hum	Hindi	Actor	Writer Venugopal
1981	Mahatma	Hindi	Actor	Written and directed by Lingam Pandu Pradeep
1981	Cyclewaala	Hindi	Actor	Writer Venugopal
1981	Interview	Hindi	Actor	Written and directed by Dr. D.K. Goel
1980	Brecht ke Laghu Natak	Hindi	Actor	Adapted from Bertolt Brecht's short plays
1980	Coffee House Mein Intezaar	Hindi	Actor	Writer Dr. Laxminarayan Lal. Varma's first play as an actor.
