= Mukhbiir =

- Promotional poster
- Directed by: Mani Shankar
- Written by: Mani Shankar
- Produced by: Sudhish Rambottla
- Starring: Sameer Dattani; Suniel Shetty; Om Puri; Raima Sen; Rahul Dev; Sushant Singh; Jackie Shroff
- Cinematography: Ajayan Vincent
- Edited by: Apurva Asrani
- Music by: Pritam Chakraborty; Sandeep Chowta; Karthik Raja; Shashi Preetam
- Release date: 29 August 2008
- Running time: 137 minutes
- Country: India
- Language: Hindi

Mukhbiir (transl. Informer) is a 2008 Indian Hindi-language spy action-thriller film directed by Mani Shankar. The film revolves around the life and events surrounding an Indian spy. The film stars Sameer Dattani, Suniel Shetty, Om Puri, Raima Sen, Sushant Singh, Rahul Dev, and Jackie Shroff, and Raima Sen.

== Premise ==
Kailash is a police informer; however, the biggest threat to Kailash's life is the corrupt police who may reveal his identity to influential criminals for huge amounts of money.

== Cast ==
- Sameer Dattani as Kailash / Vinayak D. Marathe / Shahzad Khan
- Suniel Shetty as Rehman
- Om Puri as S.P. Rathod
- Raima Sen as Roshini
- Rahul Dev as Saaya
- Sushant Singh as Pasha
- Jackie Shroff as Home Minister
- Alok Nath as Mammu
- Vinay Varma as Ismil
- Kelly Dorji as Captain Dorji
- Raj Zutshi as Biju
- Supriya Karnik as Bharati Rathod
- Beneka as Didi
- Ali Reza as Saaya's henchmen

== Production ==
Director Mani Shankar had a story in mind in 1996 itself when he was shooting an anti-militancy music video for the Intelligence Bureau. It was during this time that he met a young Intelligence Bureau recruit who was badly tortured in militant captivity. The young man was left unaided by the Indian government thereafter as he offered them no utility. This rendezvous with the stark reality of their lives inspired Mani Shankar into the story for this film. Mani Shankar was once asked in an interview on why his previous films such as Rudraksh spent too much on research and very little on character emotions. He replied in affirmative and said that he strived to blend both of them well in this film. Since the subject of the film revolved around espionage, Mani Shankar resorted to intense research to avoid any unverifiable instances in his film. He worked closely with the Indian espionage service and utilised information for the film. Producer Sudhish Rambottla selected Mani Shankar's script after reviewing 40 of them.

Shankar felt that actor Sameer Dattani would not comprehend fear and hence not emote well while filming. To overcome this, Shankar insisted that Dattani spend a night in a prison. Only the local inspector knew him to be an actor. Besides conducting several training workshops for Dattani to prepare for his character, Mani Shankar also organized a visit to the underworld. Though he had a harrowing experience during the night, he was happy that his efforts brought him praise from the critics.

== Soundtrack ==
The music was composed by Pritam, Sandeep Chowta, Shashi Preetam and Karthik Raja. All lyrics were penned by P. K. Mishra.

Mukhbiir

Soundtrack album by Pritam, Sandeep Chowta, Shashi Preetam, Karthik Raja
- Released: 2008
- Recorded: 2008
- Genre: Soundtrack
- Length: 27:41
- Label: Sony Music India

Track list
No.	Title	Music	Singer(s)	Length
1.	"Tu Salaamat"	Pritam Chakraborty	KK	6:18
2.	"Jeena"	Sandeep Chowta	Sonu Kakkar	5:03
3.	"Dhoonde Dil"	Shashi Preetam	Hariharan	6:44
4.	"Tere Bina"	Karthik Raja	Madhushree	4:21
5.	"Piya Mera Banjaara"	Karthik Raja	Sonu Kakkar	5:15
Total length:				27:41

== Release ==
Prior to its release, director Mani Shankar claimed that he was able to help the producer recover the budget costs. He hypothesized that the revenue from television, home video rights along with the soundtrack is usually more than the cost of the production. Since Mani Shankar claimed "pre-release profit" for this film due to intelligent budgeting, he was confident even before the film's release.

The film released on 29 August 2008 across India. The film's release coincided with the release of six other movies – Hijack, Chamku, C Kkompany, Rock On!!, Wanted and WALL-E. Usually Indian film distributors don't expect much from the films which are released during the Ramadan season. Citing them as "gap fillers" and average films, the distributors didn't foresee much revenue for this film and for those released during this season. On the contrary, Mani Shankar said that they tried for the film to release during the holy month of Ramadan. This was because it had relevance to film's story that had the protagonist getting converted to Islam. Actor Dattani was not quite worried about the audience' expectations, but instead he was worried about his expectations from the film.

In the first week of its release, the film garnered ₹15 lakh (US$16,000). Producer Rambottla was so impressed with the efforts of actor Dattani and director Mani Shankar, that he declared a unique money-back offer to audiences. As per this, he was prepared to offer a ticket refund to 5,000 viewers across India if they did not like the film.

== Reception ==
Though film critic Taran Adarsh liked the idea of the film, he found it similar to Ram Gopal Varma's Contract. Despite various cinematic sequences which he found to be well written and enacted, Adarsh found the climax to be totally completely unnatural. Terming it as a film that "could've been a riveting experience, but it fails to register an impact."
