= Deepthi =

Deepthi is a given name. Notable people with the name include:

- Deepthi Kumara Gunarathne (fl. from 2024), Sri Lankan politician
- Deepthi Jeevanji (born 2003), Indian athlete

== See also ==
- Deepti (disambiguation)
