= Maira Doshi =

Indian actress

- Born: Pooja K. Doshi
- Occupation: Actress
- Years active: 2017–present

Maira Doshi (born Pooja K. Doshi) is an Indian actress who works in Telugu and Gujarati cinema. She played the lead role opposite Divyang Thakkar in the 2019 Gujarati film Chasani. Doshi won the Gujarat Iconic Film Award (GIFA) 2019 for Best Debut Actor Of The Year (Female) for the Gujarati film Chasani. She worked in a Telugu web series The Grill in 2019.

== Early life and background ==
Doshi was born in Rajkot city, Gujarat. She continued her schooling in Rajkot, at Nirmala Convent School when she returned to India. Following her early interest in computer science, she completed a Bachelor of Computer Applications from the Atmiya Institute of Technologies in Rajkot. She then completed an external technology certification. She has also participated in the Gujarati folk dance Garba competition. She decided to pursue her career in the film industry and moved to Mumbai in late 2014.

== Acting career ==
Doshi's first ad was Sunsilk in 2015 where she played a small role as a college junior. It was then followed by work in advertisements like Himalaya Face Wash, Airtel and Myntraa. Doshi debuted as a protagonist as Bandhvi in a Tollywood (Telugu) film Kaadhali.

In late 2018, Doshi's mother asked her to change her name as for astrology-related purposes. Doshi changed her screen name from Pooja K. Doshi to Maira Doshi.

In 2019, Doshi completed shooting for a Telugu film IIT Krishnamurthy. The film is scheduled to release in 2020. Doshi landed the main role as Aaradhya in a Telugu web series The Grill released on an OTT platform Viu. The Grill was directed by Sharan Kopishety, entertainingly portrays a unique college story. Later that year, she was given her first main dramatic role as Shreya in Gujarati cinema by the directors Abhinn-Manthan in the movie Chasani. The film portrayed a journey of an elderly married couple, learning from new generation couples to make their married life more joyful and romantic. She won Best Debut Actor (Female) of the year 2019 by GIFA (Gujarat Iconic Film Awards) for the role.

== Filmography ==
=== Films ===
Year	Film	Role	Language	Notes
2017	Kaadhali	Bandhvi Varadharajan	Telugu	Credited as Pooja Doshi
2019	Chasani	Shreya	Gujarati	Won GIFA-2019 Best Debut Actress
2020	IIT Krishnamurthy	Jahnavi	Telugu	Released on Amazon Prime
2023	Satyaprem Ki Katha	Kinjal Kapadia	Hindi	

=== Television ===
Year	Series	Role	Network	Language
2019	The Grill	Aaradhya	Viu	Telugu
