= Raj Zutshi =

Indian actor (born 1961)

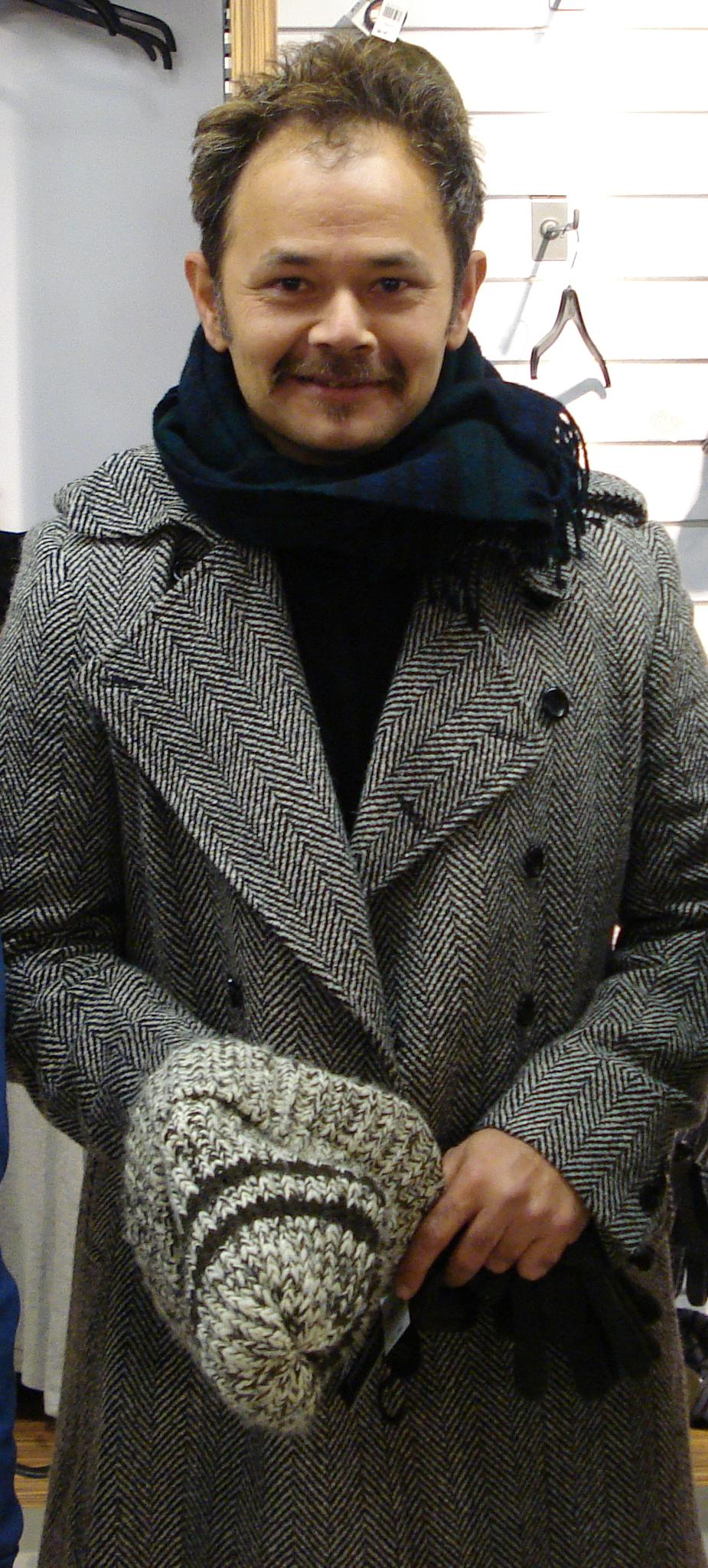
- Zutshi in 2007
- Born: Rajendranath Zutshi; 4 February 1961 (age 65); Srinagar, Jammu and Kashmir, India
- Spouse: Nuzhat Khan (divorced)

Rajendranath Zutshi (born 4 February 1961) is an Indian film and television actor.

== Personal life ==
Zutshi was born on 4 February 1961 in Srinagar, Jammu and Kashmir, India into a Kashmiri Pandit family. Raj Zutshi is a grandson of Dina Nath Zutshi, who was a radio and theatre artiste, perhaps best known to the public for his role as Halim Mirza, brother of Salim Mirza (Balraj Sahni), in the film Garam Hawa (1973).

Raj Zutshi was formerly married to Nuzhat Hussain, daughter of film-maker Nasir Hussain. He was her second husband and the step-father of actor Imran Khan, who was Nuzhat's son by her first husband, Anil Pal. Nuzhat is the sister of film-maker Mansoor Khan and the first cousin of actor Aamir Khan.

== Career ==
Raj Zutshi also began his career as a theatre artist. He made the transition from theatre to cinema in 1984 with the film Holi. He was also seen in the TV series Yugantar in 1990, which was based on the novel of Sunil Gangopadhyay, and in the TV series Shikast (1997).

== Filmography ==
Key
†	Denotes films that have not yet been released

Year	Title	Role	Other notes
1984	Holi	Rajendra Zutshi	
1986	Ankush		Uncredited
1987	Yeh Woh Manzil To Nahin		
1988	Qayamat Se Qayamat Tak	Shyam	
1989	Daddy	Nikhil Sen	
1989	Goonj	Salim	
1990	Shiva	Prakash	
1990	Tum Mere Ho	Damru	
1992	Parda Hai Parda		
1995	Ek Tha Rusty		Television Series
1996	Grihalakshmi Ka Jinn	Raj Zutshi	Television Series
1996	Maachis	Jaswant Singh Randhawa 'Jassi'	
1996	Mrityunjay	Karna	Television series
1997	Chachi 420	Dr. Rohit	
1999	Hu Tu Tu	Arun Barve	
1999	Dillagi		
2000	Hum To Mohabbat Karega		
2001	Grahan	Parvati's husband	
2001	One 2 Ka 4	Sawant	
2001	Lagaan: Once Upon a Time in India	Ismail	
2001	Dil Chahta Hai	Ajay (Tara's husband)	
2002	Nazrana	Ishita's dad	Television Series
2002	Kranti	Terrorist	
2002	Shaheed-E-Azam	Chandra Shekhar Azad	
2002	Shararat	Gajanan's son	
2002	Road	Kishan bhai	
2003	Haasil	Jackson	
2003	Saaya	Moses	
2003	Kahan Ho Tum	Police inspector	
2003	Rules: Pyaar Ka Superhit Formula	Uday	
2004	Kiss Kis Ko	Max	
2004	Lakeer - Forbidden Lines	Monty	
2004	Rudraksh	Man in mental institute	
2004	Love in Nepal	George	
2004	Murder	Inspector Rajvir Singh	
2004	Krishna Cottage	Prof. Siddharth 'Sid' Das	
2004	Lakshya	Maj. Kaushal Verma	
2004	Deewaar: Let's Bring Our Heroes Home	Jatin Kumar	
2004	American Daylight	Nirmal	
2005	Socha Na Tha	Gopal	
2005	Tango Charlie		
2005	Kyaa Kool Hai Hum	D.K.Bose	
2005	Ramji Londonwaley	Jay Kapoor	
2005	Freedom of Life	Doctor	
2005	Chocolate	Roshan Gandhi	
2005	Parzania		
2005	Ek Ajnabee		
2005	Shikhar	Raaka	
2005	Divorce: Not Between Husband and Wife	Shyam	
2006	Zinda	Woo Fong	
2006	36 China Town	Drunkard	
2006	Sandwich	Vicky B. Singh	
2006	Rockin' Meera	Prem	
2007	Just Married	Arjun Kohli	
2007	Life Mein Kabhie Kabhiee	Raj Gujral	
2007	Naqaab	Detective Sam	
2007	Frozen	Dawa	
2007	Gandhi, My Father	Grieving Fast Food Stall Owner	
2007	Speed	Raj	
2007	Goal	Monty Singh	
2008	Mukhbiir	Biju	
2008	Slumdog Millionaire	Director	
2008	1920	Father Thomas	
2008	Kidnap	Mahesh Verma	
2008	Home Comforts	Sunil	TV episode
2008	Mumbai Calling	Sunil	Featured in One Episode
2009	Kalpvriksh		
2009	Anubhav	Vanraj	
2009	Love Aaj Kal	Harleen's father	
2009	One Fine Monday		
2011	Queens! Destiny Of Dance	Hakim	
2011	Stanley Ka Dabba	History teacher	
2011	My Friend Pinto		
2012	Ekhon Nedekha Nodir Xhipare	Jayanta Doley	Assamese film
2012	Madhubala – Ek Ishq Ek Junoon	Balraj Choudhary	
2013	Gangoobai	Rohan	
2013	Woh		
2013	Kalpvriksh		
2014	Kya Dilli Kya Lahore	Barfi Singh	
2015	Ab Tak Chhappan 2	Rawle	
2015	Brothers	Baaz Raut	
2017	Viceroy's House	Head Chef	
2018	3rd Eye	Changez Khan	
2019	Family of Thakurganj	Ballu Thapa	
2019	Bhram	Dr. Rao	ZEE5 series
2021	Koi Jaane Na	Raj	
2024	Article 370	Salahuddin Jalal	
2024	Dharmarakshak Mahaveer Chhatrapati Sambhaji	Alamgir Aurangzeb	Marathi film
2025	Mirai	Banshi	Telugu film
2026	Dhurandhar: The Revenge	General Shamshad Hassan	

== Dubbing roles ==
Film title	Actor(s)	Character(s)	Dub language	Original language	Original Year release	Dub Year release	Notes
Dumbo	Michael Keaton	V. A. Vandevere	Hindi	English	2019	2019	

== Awards and nominations ==
Year	Award	Category	Show	Result
2002	Indian Telly Awards	Actor in a Negative Role	for playing Subrat in Bazaar	Nominated
