= Dream (2012 film) =

- Movie Poster
- Directed by: Bhavani Shanker K
- Written by: Bhavani Shanker K
- Produced by: Satish Mynam
- Starring: Rajendra Prasad; Pavani Reddy; Jayashree; Deepti
- Cinematography: Ravikumar Neerla
- Edited by: Basva Paidi Reddy
- Music by: Rajesh
- Production company: Kaipas' Film Production House
- Release date: 26 October 2012
- Running time: 2hrs 6minutes
- Country: India
- Language: Telugu

Dream is a 2012 Telugu-language psychological thriller film produced by Satish Mynam, Vijaya Mynam under the banner of Kaipa Film Production House and directed by Bhavani Shanker K. The film features Rajendra Prasad, Pavani Reddy and Jayashree and music composed by Rajesh. Dream is scripted and directed by Bhavani Shanker K and is his first feature film as director. The film won Royal Reel Award at the Canada International Film Festival and has also garnered selection at the New York City International Film Festival.

== Plot ==
The story runs around a retired Army officer who did not get to fight the Kargil war. He now lives with his wife in an upscale, gated community spending most of his time playing war video games. The hero suffers from Hypnagogia, a rare medical disorder. He starts dreaming and believes that his dreams are real. There is a story running in his dream and another in his real life. In a particular stage, he fails to see the demarcation and these subconscious thoughts play havoc in his life and the people around him. Dream is this journey into the mind of the protagonist. This is a Medical thriller film.

== Cast ==
- Rajendra Prasad as Army officer
- Pavani Reddy as neighbor
- Jayashree as Army officer's wife
- Deepti
- Vinay Varma

== Production ==
Dream news first came out in July 2011 by Kaipas Film Production house, the producers, with Rajendra Prasad in the lead role and Bhavani Shanker K as the director.

The director adds on the protagonist: "He is an interesting and a complex personality, youth will identify with his thoughts as dialogues are designed to appeal to them. The main lead actor Rajendra Prasad will be wearing shirts with his picture on him as he is slightly narcissistic. Jayasri, a Malayali actor plays his wife, Pavani Reddy a teenage girl and his neighbor."

== Reception ==
Dream released to positive reviews and is known to be a completely different kind of movie introduced for the first time in 60 years of Telugu movie industry. The preview show to directors, producers and movie artists of Telugu movie industry has got critical acclaim from many of the top movie industry stalwarts for both the Debutante Director and the Producers of the movie. Recently, Dream movie and its crew are getting international recognizance after getting selected in early International Film festivals of 2013 like Canada International Film Festival. The movie continued its winning spree by winning at six well-known International film festivals.

" Probably the most creative movie ever-made. Truly a new kind" - Venetia Evripiotou (Multiple Award-winning Greek Director)

" The way they depicted the mindset of psychic disorder is so perfectly true. I would love to show this movie to my students." - S. Siyani ( Psychiatrist & Medical School Professor )

" This is the only movie i have come across which can never be written in as a Novel/Story. It can only be made as a movie. Absolutely Brilliant direction" - Richard Drake ( Screenplay writer & Director )

The movie is taken as reference for its unique screenplay in Ireland Film school.

== Awards ==
Canada International Film Festival(CIFF), 2013 - Royal Reel Winner - K. Bhavani Shanker^{[13]}

LOS ANGELES MOVIE Awards 2013 - Won HONORABLE MENTION award. Winner - K. Bhavani Shanker

USA premiere at New York City International Film Festival(NYCIFF 2013)^{[14]}. http://www.nyciff.com/june-17-2013/
