= Qubool Hai? =

Indian drama television series

- Title card
- Genre: Drama
- Screenplay by: Faiz Rai
- Story by: Umair Hasan
- Directed by: Faiz Rai; Pranav Reddy; Umair Hasan
- Starring: Feroze; Manoj Muthyam; Abhilasha Poul; Vaishali Bisht; Vinay Varma; Mahesh Yadav
- Composer: Jerry Silvester Vincent
- Country of origin: India
- Original languages: Telugu; Deccani
- No. of seasons: 1
- No. of episodes: 6

Production
- Executive producers: Sanjiv Chakravarthy, Darshani
- Producer: Pranav Pingle
- Cinematography: Kartik Parmar
- Editors: Arvind Menon; Tanya Chhabria
- Camera setup: Multi-camera
- Running time: 45 minutes
- Production company: Mirage Media

Original release
- Network: Aha
- Release: 11 March 2022

Qubool Hai? (transl. I Accept?) is an Indian Telugu - Deccani language social crime action thriller webseries produced under the banner of Mirage Media and premiered on Aha on 11 March 2022. The series features Feroze, Manoj Muthyam, Abhilasha Poul, Vaishali Bisht, Vinay Varma, and Mahesh Yadav.

== Cast ==
- Feroze
- Manoj Muthyam
- Abhilasha Poul
- Vaishali Bisht
- Vinay Varma
- Mahesh Yadav
- Kamakshi Bhaskarla

== Production ==
The series was announced by Mirage Media for Aha consisting of six episodes. Feroze, Manoj Muthyam, Abhilasha Poul, Vaishali Bisht, Vinay Varma and Mahesh Yadav joined the cast. The trailer of the series was released on 8 March 2022.

== Reception ==
Akshay Krishna gave the series a three-star rating out of five in his review for OTT Play.

The series was reviewed by various other media publications, such as Hindustan Times and The Hindu.
