= Kaadhali (2017 film) =

2017 Telugu film by Pattabhi R Chilukuri

- Directed by: Pattabhi R Chilukuri
- Screenplay by: Pattabhi R Chilukuri; Anand Ranga
- Produced by: Pattabhi R Chilukuri
- Starring: Pooja Doshi; Harish Kalyan; Sai Ronak
- Cinematography: Sekhar V. Joseph
- Edited by: Marthand K. Venkatesh
- Music by: Prasan Praveen Shyam
- Production company: Anaganagana Film Company
- Release date: 16 June 2017
- Running time: 122 minutes
- Country: India
- Language: Telugu

Kaadhali (transl. Lover Girl) is a 2017 Telugu-language film directed by Pattabhi R Chilukuri in his directorial debut. The film stars debutant Pooja Doshi, Harish Kalyan and Sai Ronak in the lead roles and marks the Telugu lead film debut of Kalyan.

== Plot ==
The film is a triangular love story in which Bandhavi (Pooja Doshi) has to decide between Karthik (Harish Kalyan) and Kranti (Sai Ronak).

== Cast ==
- Pooja Doshi as Bandhavi Varadharajan
- Harish Kalyan as Karthikeyan "Karthik"
- Sai Ronak as Kranti
- Dr. Sharmila as Bandhavi's mother
- Mohan Raman as Bandhavi's father
- Sandhya Janak as Karthik's mother
- Pallavi Banothu as Bandhavi’s bestfriend
- Gururaj Manepalli
- Sudharshan as Kranti's friend
- Bhadram as Bandhavi’s friend

== Production ==
Director Pattabhi felt telling a story from a girl's point of view would be a good idea after his friends and family told him how films that featured a leading lady ran well. Harish Kalyan was roped in to be part of the cast after Pattabhi watched Kalyan's Vil Ambu. Debutant Pooja Doshi and Sai Ronak were cast after they auditioned for their respective roles. Pooja Doshi plays a Tamil girl in the film, so a Tamil title was chosen for the film.

== Soundtrack ==
The music was composed by Prasan Praveen Shyam.

Kaadhali

Soundtrack album by Prasan-Praveen-Shyam
- Released: 2017
- Recorded: 2017
- Genre: Soundtrack
- Label: Aditya Music
- Producer: Prasan-Praveen-Shyam

Prasan-Praveen-Shyam chronology
Yagavarayinum Naa Kaakka / Malupu (2015)	Kaadhali (2017)

All lyrics are written by Vanamali.

No.	Title	Singer(s)	Length
1.	"Ela Thelchaali"	Jonita Gandhi	3:32
2.	"Kaadhal Kaadhal"	Clinton Cerejo, Krishna Iyer, Farhad	3:49
3.	"Nuvvante Nenani"	Vijay Yesudas	3:58
4.	"Lokama"	Naresh Iyer, Sowmya Sharma	4:41
5.	"Valentine"	Krishna Iyer	3:35

== Release ==
This film received mixed reviews upon release.

Sangeetha Devi Dundoo of The Hindu stated that "A little more depth in characters would have helped this simple film from getting sluggish", but praised Harish Kalyan's performance stating that he "plays his part with maturity. This Tamil actor makes a promising entry into Telugu cinema". Ch Sushil Rao of The Times of India stated that "Nothing particularly great about the movie to suggest not to miss it", but also praised the performances of Kalyan and Sai Ronak and the film's music.
