= Boygiri =

- Genre: Web series Drama
- Written by: Adhir Bhat; Adhaar Khurrana; Siddharth Kumar
- Directed by: Akarsh Khurana
- Creative director: Nimisha Pandey
- Starring: See Below
- Theme music composer: Anurag Saikia
- Composer: Chaitanya Sharma
- Country of origin: India
- Original languages: Hindi, English
- No. of seasons: 1
- No. of episodes: 10

Production
- Executive producer: Kanishka Mehta
- Production locations: Mumbai, India
- Cinematography: Parthiva Nag; Mikhaeil Shah
- Editor: Ajay Sharma
- Camera setup: Multi-camera
- Running time: 18-27 minutes
- Production company: DING Entertainment

Original release
- Network: ALT Balaji
- Release: 21 April 2017

Boygiri is a 2017 Hindi web series, created and produced by Tanveer Bookwala for the video on demand platform ALTBalaji. The web series is about six friends whose lives are filled with adventures and crazy moments.

The series is available for streaming on the ALT Balaji App and its associated websites since its release date.

== Plot ==
The series revolves around six grown men, Manjot Bhasin (Adhaar Khurrana), Bandan Singh (Ajeet Singh Palawat), Bajirao Ghadigoankar (Amey Wagh), Advait Malhotra (Chaitnya Sharma), Pragnesh Wakharia (Divyang Thakkar) and Ravi Sinha (Mantra) who refuse to let go of two things in their life: their friendship and their Boygiri! The series explores their lives where there is a new adventure and every moments are crazy with uninhibited fun with their friends.

== Cast ==
- Adhaar Khurrana as Manjot Bhasin
- Ajeet Singh Palawat as Bandan Singh
- Amey Wagh as Bajirao Ghadigoankar
- Chaitnya Sharma as Advait Malhotra
- Divyang Thakkar as Pragnesh Wakharia
- Mantra Mugdh as Ravi Sinha
- Radhika Bangia
- Rashi Mal
- Sarthak Kakkar
- Shonita Joshi as Mandeep Bhasin

== List of episodes ==
- Episode 1: The Reunion
- Episode 2: The Night Out
- Episode 3: The Cricket Match
- Episode 4: The Donation
- Episode 5: The Dead Guy
- Episode 6: The Photoshoot
- Episode 7: The Nervous Bride
- Episode 8: The Birthday Party
- Episode 9: The Music Video
- Episode 10: Season Finale - The Reboot
