= Mani Shankar =

Indian filmmaker (born 1957)

- Born: Shankar Mani; 3 August 1957 (age 69); Guntur, India
- Education: BITS, Pilani
- Occupations: Film director, writer, editor
- Years active: 1980–present
- Children: Prem Shankar

Mani Shankar is an Indian film director, screenwriter and editor known for his works in Hindi cinema. He directed works such as 16 December, one of the highest-grossing films of 2002, and Tango Charlie, which was screened in several International Film Festivals and was named a permanent part of the UN's "anti-war" movies. Over his long career, Mani Shankar has worked on many films, advertisements and political campaigns.

== Early life ==
Mani Shankar graduated as a Chemical Engineer from BITS Pilani in 1978. He worked for a few years as a research engineer in process engineering and drug delivery. During his time at BITS Pilani, he won a record 4 consecutive Holofest 'Best Hologram of The Year', earning the nickname "Young Mani".

== Filmography ==
- Manishi (1991)
- 16 December (2002)
- Rudraksh (2004)
- Tango Charlie (2005)
- Mukhbiir (2008)
- Knock Out (2010)
- Hey Kameeni (2023)

== Music Videos ==
- Apna Desh - Meri jaan Hindustan (1995)

== Holography ==
Shankar introduced holograms to India. He spearheaded the first holographic campaign for Narendra Modi (the current PM of India) during the 2012 Gujarat Legislative Assembly election.

He has since conducted election campaigns for various parties, including the Telangana Rashtra Samithi during the 2014 Telangana Legislative Assembly election, who eventually won the race, as well as the Nationalist Congress Party during the 2014 Maharashtra Legislative Assembly election, which stemmed the decline of the party.

== Augmented Reality ==
In February 2017, Mani Shankar launched the first live augmented reality political campaign in the world for Shri Devendra Fadnavis, Chief Minister of Maharashtra State, India. For the first time, such a campaign enabled an electoral candidate to virtually enter people's homes and softly pitch for votes.

The campaign was declared a success. The effectivity of augmented reality as a political campaign tool was established.

A series of augmented reality projects thus followed, in various fields ranging from film publicity, sports, spirituality and corporate launches. AR Rahman announced on his official Facebook page that he got his augmented reality channels done by Mani Shankar and Kaali Sudheer.
