= College (2000 film) =

2000 Indian film by Ravi Chavali

- Directed by: Ravi Chavali
- Written by: Ravi Chavali (story, screenplay & dialogues)
- Produced by: Taranga Subramanyam
- Starring: Sivaji; Manya; Lahari; Sadanand; Duvvasi Mohan
- Cinematography: Vijay C. Kumar
- Music by: Sashi Preetam
- Production company: Taranga Films
- Release date: 10 November 2000
- Country: India
- Language: Telugu

College is a 2000 Telugu-language romantic drama film written and directed by Ravi Chavali and produced by Taranga Subramanyam under the banner of Taranga Films. The film stars Sivaji, Manya, Lahari, and Sadanand in lead roles, with music composed by Sashi Preetam.

The story revolves around a college student, Suri, who embarks on a journey to discover the identity of an anonymous admirer, eventually learning valuable lessons about love. Upon release, the film received positive reviews but was not commercially successful. The song "Maayadari Mysamma" became particularly popular.

== Plot ==
Suri, a final-year undergraduate student, is initially uninterested in love and believes it is a waste of time. However, his perspective begins to change when he receives a letter from an anonymous admirer who expresses her love for him and provides a clue about her identity. Despite dismissing the letter at first, Suri's curiosity is piqued, and he embarks on a quest to find out who the girl is as he follows the clues; his feelings for her start to develop.

Although Suri's friends help him in his search, he remains unable to uncover the sender's identity. To test true love, he places a musical pendant in the mailbox of the ladies' hostel. He suspects that his classmate, Lekha, may be the one in love with him, but remains indifferent to her affection.

At the farewell party, Suri dances with Pankajakshi, a less conventionally attractive student, and unexpectedly enjoys the dance. Pankajakshi's eyes reveal her love for him. Meanwhile, Lekha plans to announce her feelings for Suri at the party publicly. Just as she is about to declare her love, the pendant that Suri had placed in the mailbox falls from Pankajakshi's hands. With the music from the pendant playing, Suri realizes that Pankajakshi is his true love and confesses his feelings, leading to a happy conclusion.

== Cast ==
- Sivaji as Suri
- Manya as Lekha
- Lahari as Pankajakshi
- Sadanand
- Duvvasi Mohan
- Gundu Hanumantha Rao
- Babloo

== Production ==
Directed by Ravi Chavali, who had previously worked on Bachelors (2000), College targeted a youthful audience, particularly college students.

== Music ==
The soundtrack of College features music composed by Sashi Preetam. The song "Maayadari Maisammo," traditionally sung during the Bonalu festival in the Telangana region, has been used in this film. The song became popular and is considered one of the highlights of the film. Audio was released through Aditya Music.

Track list
No.	Title	Lyrics	Singer(s)	Length
1.	"Chirigina Jeans"	Sashi Preetam	Sashi Preetam	5:57
2.	"L.K.G.Nundi"	Kulasekhar	Smita	4:43
3.	"Ekkada Dagunnavu"	Sashi Preetam	Sashi Preetam	4:13
4.	"Okka Sari Back"	Kulasekhar	Malik, Ravi Varma, Srikanth, Sivaji	3:48
5.	"Mayadari Maisamma"	Gundeti Ramesh	Srikanth	4:21
Total length:				23:02

== Reception ==
Idlebrain.com rated the film 3 out of 5, stating, "This film is a neat film sans too much vulgarity. Best recommended for the college youth." Andhra Today reviewed College as a short but sweet love story with good entertainment, highlighting the director's clever handling of suspense and the popular song "Maayadari Mysamma" as a standout. Andhra Online also rated the film 3 out of 5 stars and wrote, "The film, College is based on the consummate screenplay and has no particular story line to narrate".
