= Friends (2002 film) =

- Directed by: Bandi Ramesh
- Written by: Bandi Ramesh
- Dialogue by: Chintapalli Ramana
- Produced by: Ch. Mallikharjuna Rao
- Starring: Sivaji; Ali; Sri Harsha; Navin; Amritha; Nivi
- Cinematography: Vijay Kumar C.
- Edited by: Kola Bhaskar
- Music by: Shashi Preetam
- Production company: Matha Productions
- Release date: 13 April 2002
- Country: India
- Language: Telugu

Friends is a 2002 Indian Telugu-language film directed by Bandi Ramesh and starring Sivaji, Ali, Sri Harsha, Navin, Amritha and Nivi.

== Cast ==
- Sivaji as Balu
- Ali as Chanti
- Sri Harsha as Vasu a.k.a. Dumbu
- Navin as Dattu
- Amritha as Swapna
- Nivi
- Rajeev Kanakala as Siddhu
- Brahmanandam as Boxer Baba
- M. S. Narayana as House Owner
- Narra Venkateswara Rao as Balu's father
- Naresh
- L. B. Sriram
- Mallikarjuna Rao
- Tanikella Bharani
- Rallapalli
- Banerjee
- Ananth
- Dharmavarapu Subrahmanyam
- Gautam Raju
- Annapoorna
- Jogi Brothers
- Delhi Rajeswari
- Junior Relangi

== Soundtrack ==
The music was composed by Shashi Preetam. The lyrics were written by Bhuvana Chandra, Kulasekhar, Venigalla Rambabu, and Vijayaditya.

Track listing
No.	Title	Singer(s)	Length
1.	"Be Happy Be Happy"		3:41
2.	"Sneham Sneham"	S. P. Balasubrahmanyam	0:54
3.	"Matthuga Chuse Javaraala"	Mano	2:46
4.	"Neekai Kalala Kallu Thericha"	S. P. Balasubrahmanyam	4:15
5.	"Bhale Kurrallu"		4:01
Total length:			15:39

== Reception ==
A critic from The Hindu wrote that "It is more a time pass drama, but for those last few reels. The dialogue and scenic structure are meant more for entertainment". A critic from Idlebrain.com rated the film 2 1/2 out of 5 and wrote that "The story of the film is good. Bandi Ramesh, the director, did the justice in portraying friendship in a very believable way. But the director failed to maintain the grip on the film throughout".
