= Chasani =

2019 film directed by Abhinn Manthan

- Directed by: Manthan Purohit; Abhinn Sharma
- Written by: Manthan Joshi; Virender Vashisht
- Produced by: Munna Shukul; Shikha Sharma; Jayesh Patel
- Starring: Manoj Joshi; Sejal Shah; Divyang Thakkar; Maira Doshi; Ojas Rawal
- Cinematography: Tapan Vyas
- Edited by: Bharat S Raawat; Nidhi Raawat
- Music by: Prashant Satose
- Production companies: Shukul Showbiz; Sagar S Sharma Production
- Release date: 19 July 2019 (India)
- Country: India
- Language: Gujarati

Chasani is a 2019 Indian Gujarati film directed by Abhinn Sharma and Manthan Purohit. The film is produced by Jayesh Patel, Munna Shukul and Shikha Sharma under the banners Sagar S Sharma Productions and Shukul Showbiz. Veer Vashisht has written the story. The film has an ensemble cast of Manoj Joshi, Sejal Shah, Divyang Thakkar, Maira Doshi and Ojas Rawal.

Chasani won four awards in the Gujarati Iconic Film Awards 2019 (GIFA). It also won an award in the Toronto GIFA 2020. It was nominated in the Critics Choice Film Awards 2020. The film was released on 19 July 2019 in theatres all around Gujarat and in Mumbai, Maharashtra. The film became available to watch on OTT platform like ShemarooMe.

== Cast ==
- Manoj Joshi as Ramniklal
- Sejal Shah as Vasanti
- Divyang Thakkar as Rahul
- Maira Doshi as Shreya
- Ojas Rawal as Logi
- Ashish Bhatt
- Vaidehi Upadhyay

== Synopsis ==
The story of Chasani runs in three parallel storylines all interlinked with each other. The first one is of Ramnik (Manoj Joshi), a businessman and his wife Vasanti (Sejal Shah), a dutiful, loving and caring wife who have been married for 25 years. Ramnik is the typical patriarchal male of the house who is dominating but also caring. Vasanti is a sorted woman who, like every Indian housewife, takes care of the house.

The other story is of Ramnik and Rahul (Divyang Thakkar), a young lad who believes that love has to be expressed in words and action. In the course of the story, Rahul makes Ramnik realize his mistake and helps him in expressing love to his wife Vasanti.

The third storyline is that of Rahul and Shreya (Maira Doshi), Ramnik's daughter. Rahul and Shreya love each other dearly. Initially, Shreya faces parental opposition in her decision to marry Rahul.

But finally, Rahul succeeds in sorting Ramnik's married life and in the process gets Ramnik to agree to marry off Shreya to him forms the crux of the story.

== Production ==
Shukul Showbiz along with Sagar S Sharma Productions was the production houses that together made the film. The story for the film was written by Veer Vashishth, Abhinn Sharma and Manthan Purohit. Tapan Vyas was the Director of Photography(DOP). The chief editors were Nidhi Rawat and Bharat Rawat. The art director was Rajesh Rathore and dance director was Dev Thape. The film was shot extensively in Vesu and Dumas Beach, Surat. The song ‘Chakdhol’ was filmed in Anand, Gujarat.

== Soundtrack ==
The music director for Chasani is Prashant Satose and Manthan Joshi has penned the lyrics.

Chakdol

Soundtrack album by Kirtidan Gadhvi Saveri Verma
- Genre: Garba (dance)
- Length: 4:10
- Label: Shukul Music
External audio
- Chakdol on YouTube

Tracklist
| No. | Title | Artist(s) | Length |
|---|---|---|---|
| 1. | "Chakdol" | Kirtidan Gadhvi, Saveri Verma | 4:35 |
| 2. | "Fuki Gai" | Prashant Satose | 4:31 |
| 3. | "Tuj Re" | Deepali Saathe, Jigardan Gadhavi | 4:46 |
| 4. | "Gujarati Re" | Jigardan Gadhavi | 2:46 |
| Total length: | | | 15:58 |

== Release ==
The movie made its official premiere at Surat on 19 July 2019. The film was released in theaters all over Gujarat and in Mumbai, Maharashtra. The film was released on 7 November 2019 in UAE. The movie made its world digital premiere on 14 August 2021 on ShemarooMe.

=== Reception ===
The family film opened to positive reviews both from the audience and the critics. The critics praised Manoj Joshi and Sejal Shah's stellar performance. Divyang Thakkar's role as Rahul also stood out for its simplicity and wisdom. Shruti Jambekar of Times Of India gave the film a 3-star rating and called the film a decent outcome. She praised the cinematography of Tapan Vyas, the dialogues of the film and the acting skills of Manoj Joshi and Sejal Shah. The film ran to packed houses in the initial weeks of its release. It continued its run in the theaters for continuous 125 days. It collected about 10 crores of revenue from its theaterical release.

== Awards and nominations ==
| Award | Category | Recipient(s) and nominee(s) | Result |
|---|---|---|---|
| Toronto GIFA (Gujarati Iconic Film Awards) 2020 | Best Emerging Film Of The Year 2020 | Chasani | Won |
| GIFA (Gujarati Iconic Film Awards) 2019 | Best Film Of The Year | Producer: Shukul Showbiz Director: Abhinn-Manthan | Won |
| GIFA (Gujarati Iconic Film Awards) 2019 | Story Writer Of The Year | Veer Vashisht, Abhinn-Manthan | Won |
| GIFA (Gujarati Iconic Film Awards) 2019 | Debutante Actor Of The Year (Female) | Maira Doshi | Won |
| GIFA (Gujarati Iconic Film Awards) 2019 | Best Editor Of The Year | Nidhi Raawat, Bharat Rawaat | Won |
| GIFA (Gujarati Iconic Film Awards) 2019 | Best Director Of The Year | Abhinn-Manthan | Nominated |
| GIFA (Gujarati Iconic Film Awards) 2019 | Best Actor In A Comic Role (Male) | Ojas Rawal | Nominated |
| GIFA (Gujarati Iconic Film Awards) 2019 | Best Choreographer Of The Year | Dev Thape | Nominated |
| GIFA (Gujarati Iconic Film Awards) 2019 | Best Cinematographer Of The Year | Tapan Vyas | Nominated |
| GIFA (Gujarati Iconic Film Awards) 2019 | Best Actor In A Supporting Role (Female) | Sejal Shah | Nominated |
| GIFA (Gujarati Iconic Film Awards) 2019 | Best Dialogue Of The Year | Manthan Joshi | Nominated |
| GIFA (Gujarati Iconic Film Awards) 2019 | Best Singer (Male) | Jigardan Gadhavi for Tuj Re song | Nominated |
| GIFA (Gujarati Iconic Film Awards) 2019 | Best Singer (Male) | Prashant Satose for Break Up song | Nominated |
| Critics Choice Film Awards (CCFA) | Best Director (Gujarati) | Abhinn-Manthan | Nominated |
| Critics Choice Film Awards (CCFA) | Best Film (Gujarati) | Chasani | Nominated |
| Critics Choice Film Awards (CCFA) | Best Writing (Gujarati) | Veer Vashisht, Abhinn-Manthan, Manthan Joshi | Nominated |
