= Tango Charlie =

2005 Indian film by Mani Shankar

- Theatrical release poster
- Directed by: Mani Shankar
- Written by: Mani Shankar
- Produced by: Nitin Manmohan
- Starring: Ajay Devgn; Bobby Deol; Sanjay Dutt; Suniel Shetty; Tanishaa; Nandana Sen; Kelly Dorji
- Narrated by: Bobby Deol
- Cinematography: T. Surendra Reddy
- Music by: Songs: Anand Raaj Anand; Anu Malik; Background Score: Ranjit Barot
- Production company: Neha Arts
- Distributed by: Shree Ashtavinayak Cine Vision
- Release date: 25 March 2005
- Running time: 143 minutes
- Country: India
- Language: Hindi
- Budget: ₹13.5 crore
- Box office: ₹11.08 crore

Tango Charlie is a 2005 Indian Hindi-language war film written and directed by Mani Shankar. The film stars Bobby Deol as the title character, alongside Ajay Devgn, Sanjay Dutt, Sunil Shetty, Tanishaa, Nandana Sen and Sudesh Berry. The film follows paramilitary man Tarun Chauhan's (Bobby Deol) journey from a young border guard recruit to a war-hardened fighter in the Indian Border Security Force. This film was banned for release in Assam for allegedly defaming the Bodo community of Northeast India.

== Plot ==
Two Indian Air Force helicopter pilots, Squadron Leader Vikram Rathore and Flight Lieutenant Shezad Khan (played by Sanjay Dutt and Sunil Shetty respectively) rescue an injured Indian trooper amidst a pile of dead terrorists in the Kashmir valley. They read his diary to learn his story, as the film unfolds. Tarun Chauhan (Bobby Deol), a young Border Security Force recruit, joins under the mentorship of veteran soldier Havaldar Mohammad Ali. Nicknamed Tango Charlie, Tarun is thrust into violent insurgencies, riots, and counter-terrorism operations across different regions of India. His journey takes him from battling separatists in the Northeast and Maoists in central India to witnessing communal strife in Gujarat and facing militancy in Kashmir. Through these experiences, he evolves from a naive recruit into a hardened soldier, grappling with questions of duty, morality, and the human cost of war. The film portrays his transformation against the backdrop of India’s internal conflicts, highlighting both his personal struggles and his role as a soldier upholding national security.

The film returns to the beginning, Chauhan being rescued by the helicopter pilots. Later the pilots are rewarded for finding Tango Charlie. Havaldar Ali is awarded posthumously with the Ashok Chakra.

== Cast ==
- Bobby Deol as BSF Soldier Sepoy Tarun Chauhan (Tango Charlie)
- Ajay Devgan as BSF Soldier Hawaldar Mohammad Ali (Mike Alpha)
- Sanjay Dutt as Squadron Leader Vikram Rathore
- Sunil Shetty as Flight Lieutenant Shezad Khan
- Tanishaa as Lachchi Narayan / Lachchi Tarun Chauhan
- Nandana Sen as Shyamoli, the daughter of the Bengali landlord
- Sudesh Berry as BSF Soldier Bhiku
- Shahbaz Khan as BSF Soldier Dev Dixit
- Rajesh Khera as BSF Soldier Constable Sangram Singh
- Suresh Ghera as Manipur BSF Officer
- Alok Nath as Mr. Anand Chauhan Tarun Chauhan's father
- Ayesha Jaleel as Mrs Chauhan Tarun Chauhan's mother
- Vivek Shauq as Abhay, Tarun's friend
- Sanjay Mishra as Tarun's friend
- Tiku Talsania as Ram Narayan (Lachchi's father)
- Kelly Dorji as Bodo people militant leader
- Arun Behl as Bodo militant
- Anjan Srivastav as Doctor
- Mukesh Tiwari as Pakistani Army Fidayeen Leader
- Rajendranath Zutshi as Bengali Naxal leader
- Subrat Dutta as Naxal leader's henchman
- Abhijit Lahiri as Landlord Rai Bahadur
- Atul Mongia as Pakistani Army Soldier Aslam Jehangir
- Pabitra Rabha as Bodo militant group deputy

== Soundtrack ==
Tango Charlie

Soundtrack album by Anu Malik Anand Raaj Anand
- Released: 5 March 2005
- Genre: Feature film soundtrack
- Label: T-Series

The music for the movie was mainly composed by Anu Malik.

#	Title	Singer(s)
1	"Odhani Odhali"	Udit Narayan, Mahalakshmi Iyer
2	"Akkad Te Bakkad Te"	Udit Narayan, Kailash Kher, Vijay Prakash, Kunal Ganjawala
3	"Ek Diwani Ladki"	Shaan, Shreya Ghoshal
4	"Dheere Dheere"	Sonu Nigam, Shreya Ghoshal
5	"Kya Bataaoon Dil Ruba"	Udit Narayan, Alka Yagnik
6	"Ae Aasmaan"	Sonu Nigam

== Release and reception ==
=== Critical reception ===
BBC's Jaspreet Pandohar described the film as "an interesting study of terrorism, violence, and valour". Ziya Us Salam of The Hindu called the film "a visual treat with a daring theme" and "dares to enter where the Indian media shies away". Harish Kotian of Rediff.com wrote, "The movie tries to glimpse into the life of soldiers, and the sacrifices they make, but somewhere in the middle, the movie loses its plot."
