= Sushant Singh =

Indian actor

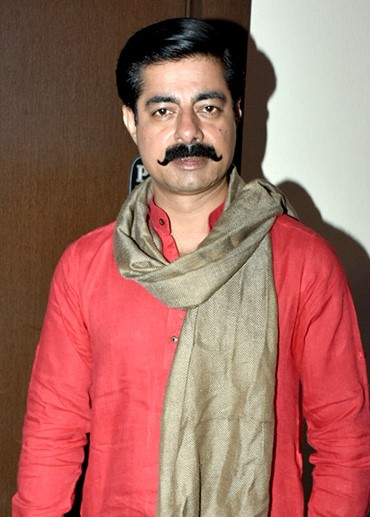
- Singh at the CINTAA event
- Education: Kirori Mal College
- Occupations: Actor; host; author; writer
- Known for: Jungle; The Legend of Bhagat Singh; Dubai Seenu; Rakta Charitra; Hate Story 2 Savdhaan India

Sushant Singh is an Indian actor and television presenter known for his work in Hindi cinema. He made his acting debut in 1998 with Ram Gopal Varma's Satya and gained critical acclaim for his role as the bandit Durgaa Narayan Chaudhary in Jungle (2000), for which he won the IIFA Award and Zee Cine Award for Best Performance in a Negative Role.

Singh went on to appear in acclaimed films like the period dramas Dr. Babasaheb Ambedkar (2000) and The Legend of Bhagat Singh (2002), further establishing his career in Hindi cinema. He has also worked in a few Telugu films like Dubai Seenu (2007). Beyond acting, he hosted the popular crime show Savdhaan India on Life OK and STAR Bharat.

Singh also served as the Honorary Secretary of the Cine and Television Artists Association (CINTAA) until May 2020, stepping down for personal reasons. He is also an author, having co-written the book Queens of Crime with Kulpreet Yadav.

== Filmography ==
Key
†	Denotes films that have not yet been released

=== Films ===
Year	Title	Role	Language
1998	Satya	Pakiya	Hindi
1999	Kaun	Qureshi	Hindi
2000	Josh	Gothiya	Hindi
2000	Jungle	Durga Narayan Chaudhary	Hindi
2000	Dr. Babasaheb Ambedkar	Asnodkhar	English
2002	16 December	Victor	Hindi
2002	The Legend of Bhagat Singh	Sukhdev Thapar	Hindi
2003	Dum	Mohan	Hindi
2003	Darna Mana Hai	Serial Killer	Hindi
2003	Matrubhoomi	Sooraj	Hindi
2003	Samay: When Time Strikes	Satya	Hindi
2004	Kuch to Gadbad Hai	Jai B. Khanna	Hindi
2004	Paisa Vasool	Example	Hindi
2004	Lakshya	Capt. Jalal Akbar	Hindi
2005	Sehar	Gajraj Singh	Hindi
2005	D	Muqarram	Hindi
2005	Shikhar	Bhajanlal	Hindi
2006	Family: Ties of Blood	Abhir V. Sahi	Hindi
2006	Waris Shah: Ishq Daa Waaris	Inayat	Punjabi
2007	Red: The Dark Side	ACP Abhay Rastogi	Hindi
2007	Dubai Seenu	Jinnah Bhai	Telugu
2007	Ram Gopal Varma Ki Aag	Tambe	Hindi
2007	Laaga Chunari Mein Daag	Ratan Sahay	Hindi
2007	Tsunami 81	Rajan Pillai	Hindi
2007	Showbiz	Sharad Baldev Singh Rajpoot	Hindi
2008	Mukhbiir	Pasha	Hindi
2008	Hulla	Raj Shiv Puri	Hindi
2009	Mohandas	Bishnath / Fake Mohandas	Hindi
2009	Toss: A Flip of Destiny	Two	Hindi
2009	Baabarr	Tabrez Alam	Hindi
2010	Lahore	Dheerender Singh	Hindi
2010	Idiot Box	Subhrojeet Chakraborty/Abhrojeet Chakraborty	Hindi
2010	Paathshaala	Vijendra Chauhan	Hindi
2010	Musaa: The Most Wanted	Veerji	Hindi
2010	Knock Out	Inspector Vikram	Hindi
2010	Rakhta Charitra I	Shankar Ravi	Hindi/Telugu
2010	Rakhta Charitra II	Shankar Ravi	Hindi/Telugu
2010	Mirch	Nitin	Hindi
2010	Ragada	Nanda	Telugu
2011	Yeh Saali Zindagi	Inspector Satbir	Hindi
2012	Chaar Din Ki Chandni	Yashwant Singh	Hindi
2012	Daruvu	Harbour Babu	Telugu
2013	Four Two Ka One	ACP Sushant Singh	Hindi
2013	Kirchiyaan	Inspector	Hindi
2014	Hate Story 2	Mandar Mhatre	Hindi
2015	Baby	Wasim Khan	Hindi
2017	Lipstick Under My Burkha	Rahim Aslam, Shireen's husband	Hindi
2019	Pailwaan	Raja Rana Pratap Singh	Kannada
2022	Good Luck Jerry	Daler	Hindi
2025	Inn Galiyon Mein	Anna Seth	Hindi
2025	Ek Chatur Naar	Inspector Triloki	Hindi
2025	Kis Kisko Pyaar Karoon 2	Inspector David D'Costa	Hindi
2026	Mirzapur	Bhairav Singh	Hindi

=== Television ===
Year	Title	Role	Channel	Notes
2001—02	Dhadkan	Dr. Alan Fernandes	Sony TV (India)	
2007—08	Virrudh	Sushant Sharma (Vasudha's Husband)	Sony Entertainment Television	
2010—11	Zindagi Ka Har Rang...Gulaal	Dushyant	StarPlus	
2011	Wanted: High Alert	Himself as host		
2016	Success Stories- Zameen Se Falak Tak	Himself as host		
2012—21	Savdhaan India	Himself as host	Life OK/Star Bharat	
2019	Rangbaaz	Jai Ram Godara	ZEE5	Web series
2019	Yehh Jadu Hai Jinn Ka!	Junaid Khan		
2019-2023	City Of Dreams	Jagan Hejmadi/ Anna	Disney+ Hotstar	Web Series
2020	A Simple Murder	Himmat	SonyLIV	Web series
2021	Jeet Ki Zid	Colonel Ranjeet Chaudhary	ZEE5	Web series
2023	Rana Naidu	Tej Naidu	Netflix	Web series
2023	Rafuchakkar	Sarvesh Pathania	JioCinema	Web series
2023	The Freelancer	Inayat Khan	Disney+ Hotstar	Web series
2024	IC 814: The Kandahar Hijack	Ravi Shankar	Netflix	TV mini series

== Awards and nominations ==
International Indian Film Academy Awards

Year	Category	Role	Film	Result	Ref.(s)
2001	Best Performance in a Negative Role	Durga Narayan Chaudhary	Jungle	Won	
2003	Best Supporting Actor	Sukhdev	The Legend of Bhagat Singh	Nominated	

Screen Awards

Year	Category	Role	Film	Result
2003	Best Supporting Actor	Sukhdev	The Legend of Bhagat Singh	Nominated

Zee Cine Awards

Year	Category	Role	Film	Result	Ref.(s)
2001	Best Performance in a Negative Role	Durga Narayan Chaudhary	Jungle	Won	
