= Jayeshbhai Jordaar =

2022 Indian film by Divyang Thakkar

- Theatrical release poster
- Directed by: Divyang Thakkar
- Written by: Divyang Thakkar
- Produced by: Maneesh Sharma
- Starring: Ranveer Singh; Shalini Pandey; Ratna Pathak Shah; Boman Irani; Diksha Joshi
- Cinematography: Siddharth Diwan
- Edited by: Namrata Rao
- Music by: Score: Sanchit Balhara and Ankit Balhara; Songs: Vishal–Shekhar
- Production company: Yash Raj Films
- Distributed by: Yash Raj Films
- Release date: 13 May 2022
- Running time: 124 minutes
- Country: India
- Language: Hindi
- Budget: ₹85 crore
- Box office: est. ₹26.31 crore

Jayeshbhai Jordaar is a 2022 Indian Hindi-language comedy-drama film written and directed by Divyang Thakkar. It is produced by Maneesh Sharma under Yash Raj Films. The film stars Ranveer Singh as the eponymous lead, alongside Shalini Pandey, Boman Irani, and Ratna Pathak Shah. It follows Jayesh Patel, the son of a Gujarati patriach, who believes in equal rights between males and females in society.

Principal photography commenced in Mumbai on 4 December 2019, which later shifted to Gujarat. Filming was concluded on 7 February 2020. The film was met with multiple postponements during 2020–2021, due to the COVID-19 pandemic. The film was released theatrically on 13 May 2022. Upon release, it received positive reviews from critics and audiences. However, due to lack of marketing and lower foot falls post Covid-19 pandemic, theaters were still impacted, therefore, the movie underperformed at the box office.

== Plot ==
Jayesh Patel (lovingly called Jayeshbhai Jordaar by his daughter) is an educated man who lives with his father Pruthvishbhai (the village sarpanch), his mother Jashoda, his pregnant wife Mudra, and his modern daughter Siddhi in the fictional village of Pravingadh. Mudra and Jayesh have a very superficial relationship, seeming that they are only together to produce a male heir. Regardless, Jayesh is madly in love with his wife and hopes to one day have his first kiss with her.

The family hopes that Mudra's child will be a boy, so that he can continue the family lineage and become the next Gujarati sarpanch after Jayesh. In a regular check up with the doctor, Jayesh learns that his second child is also a girl.

In a flashback, it is revealed that Siddhi's birth was forgiven because she was the firstborn, but after that, Mudra was forced to abort 6 female children in her womb in the past 9 years, for not being able to conceive a male heir; if Mudra has to abort one more child, it is likely she will not be able to get pregnant again. However, Jayesh, who strongly believes in having equal rights for both men and women, decides not to inform his family that the child is a girl as he wants the baby to be born.

He makes a plan to elope with Mudra and Siddhi to Laadopur, a fictional village in Haryana, whose entire population are strong males only. The men in this village posted a video to social media begging women to come to their town, saying that they will treat them with immense respect and love them like they are queens. Jayesh sees this video on the internet and decides that this will be the safest place for their family.

After Jashoda one day arranges a meeting with a doctor who could predict the gender for the expected child, Jayesh feels pressure to execute his plan. He, Mudra, and Siddhi put on an act where Mudra 'kidnaps' Jayesh and takes him hostage in front of Jashodha and Pruthvishbhai. She says she is leaving to have her child, and not to follow her.

This act sets off a series of events, some fortunate and some not, where Jayesh, his wife, and his child have to escape the clutches of his parents and all the men in the village of Pravingadh. Jayesh desperately tries to relocate his family to Laadopur, and will do anything to save his expected child. While doing this, he not only fights for the rights of his wife, who is starting to reciprocate his feelings of love, but also for the rights of all the other ladies in his sexist village; they face many issues along the way, one being Jayesh being forced to remarry, but they push through all of the hardships.

When Mudra's water finally breaks and she is going into labor, Jayesh and her go to the hospital which is being protected by Siddhi, the men of Laadopur, and the women of Pravingadh. Mudra finally gives birth to a healthy baby girl, kissing Jayesh in relief. As Jayesh goes to the waiting room, he finds all the women of Pravingadh waiting to relocate to Laadopur, as they are sick of living in a sexist village. Jayesh explains to them that change takes time, and that he takes back everything he said about fleeing Pravingadh with his family. He says that although it is wrong, they must understand why their husbands are the way they are, and not give up hope on changing them. His speech is extremely moving, and touches the heart of not only the women, but also the men of Pravingadh and Laadopur.

== Cast ==
- Ranveer Singh as Jayesh Patel aka Jayeshbhai Jordaar
- Shalini Pandey as Mudra, Jayesh's wife
- Boman Irani as Pruthvishbhai, Jayesh's father
- Ratna Pathak Shah as Jashoda, Jayesh's mother
- Jia Vaidya as Siddhi, Jayesh and Mudra's daughter
- Deeksha Joshi as Preeti, Jayesh's sister
- Puneet Issar as Amar Tau
- Ragi Jani as Sanjaybhai, Jayesh's uncle

== Production ==
The film was announced on 27 May 2019 under the title Jayeshbhai Jordaar, directed by Divyang Thakkar, produced by Yash Raj Films, starring Ranveer Singh as the titular Gujarati man. Principal photography began in Mumbai in December 2019. Boman Irani and Ratna Pathak Shah were cast as Singh's parents while Shalini Pandey was cast as the female lead. The Gujarat schedule commenced in January 2020. Filming was concluded on 7 February 2020.

== Release ==
Jayeshbhai Jordaar was initially scheduled to release on 2 October 2020 coinciding with Gandhi Jayanti. As a result of the COVID-19 pandemic, it was postponed to 27 August 2021, and then 25 February 2022. The film was released theatrically on 13 May 2022.

== Reception ==
=== Box office ===
Jayeshbhai Jordaar earned ₹3.25 crore at the domestic box office on its opening day. On the second day, the film collected ₹4 crore. On the third day, the film collected ₹4.75 crore, taking its total domestic weekend collection to ₹12 crore.

As of 27 May 2022, the film grossed ₹18.56 crore in India and ₹7.75 crore overseas, for a worldwide gross collection of ₹26.31 crore.

=== Critical response ===
On the review aggregator website Rotten Tomatoes, 80% of 5 critics' reviews are positive, with an average rating of 5.3/10.

Nairita Mukherjee of India Today rated the film 3.5 out of 5 stars and wrote "Ranveer Singh brings a surge of oestrogen in a wave of testosterone with Jayeshbhai Jordaar," praising the film's powerful social message and Ranveer's commendable performance. Umesh Punwani of Koimoi rated the film 3.5 out of 5 stars and wrote, "Jayeshbai Jordaar doesn't address an 'outdated subject', it picks up an issue tackled before adding its own charm, humour, 'pappi-worthy' emotions & 'oh so amazing' performances by Ranveer, Jia." Bollywood Hungama rated the film 3 out of 5 stars and wrote, "Divyang Thakkar's story is the need of the hour and blends entertainment and a social message. Thakkar's direction is supreme. It’s difficult to believe that this is his debut directorial venture. The execution is neat and impactful." Sukanya Verma of Rediff rated the film 3 out of 5 stars and wrote, "Essentially a message movie, Jayeshbhai Jordaar masks its horror in humour to play out like an on-the-run road trip. Thakkar lightens up a serious situation in a manner that's both ironic and telling." Devesh Sharma of Filmfare rated the film 3 out of 5 stars and wrote, "Divyang Thakkar has successfully created a likeable hero who is the antithesis of toxic masculinity. Ranveer Singh has been playing macho characters in most films, like Bajirao Mastani and Padmavat, and it’s great that he plays a different kind of warrior, bringing his burst of energy to this mild-mannered middle class hero."

Aishwarya Vasudevan of OTTplay rated the film 3 out of 5 stars and wrote, "Without becoming preachy, the film tells the story of a naive and feminist man who puts on his alpha persona in front of his family and the entire world." Sanchita Jhunjhunwala of India Forums rated the film 3.5 out of 5 stars and wrote, "Jayeshbhai Jordaar has a message that many know of, and yet unsee it. Putting it out on the big screen serves as a reminder for those who need one, and for others, it is truly a poignant watch." Anupama Chopra of Film Companion wrote, "Debutant writer-director Divyang Thakkar creates a sanitized, amiable, sometimes bordering on farcical but always heartfelt saga of a closet feminist who decides to rebel against his awful, overbearing Sarpanch father and protect his wife and unborn daughter."

== Soundtrack ==
Jayeshbhai Jordaar

Soundtrack album by Vishal–Shekhar
- Released: 25 April 2022
- Recorded: 2021
- Studio: Yash Raj Studio
- Genre: Feature film soundtrack
- Length: 18:15
- Language: Hindi
- Label: YRF Music

Vishal–Shekhar chronology
Bob Biswas (2021)	Jayeshbhai Jordaar (2022)	Vikram Vedha (2022)

Official audio
- Jayeshbhai Jordaar - Full Album on YouTube

The film music is composed by Vishal–Shekhar with lyrics written by Kumaar, Jaideep Sahni, Vishal Dadlani and Vayu.

Track Listing
No.	Title	Lyrics	Singer(s)	Length
1.	"Firecracker"	Kumaar, Vayu	Vishal Dadlani, Shekhar Ravjiani	2:46
2.	"Dheere Dheere Seekh Jaaunga"	Jaideep Sahni	Shekhar Ravjiani, Priya Saraiya	4:23
3.	"Jordaar"	Jaideep Sahni	Vishal Dadlani, Keerthi Sagathia	2:34
4.	"Dil Ki Gali"	Jaideep Sahni	Katyayni, Shekhar Ravjiani	2:59
5.	"Firecracker" (English)	Vishal Dadlani, Kumaar, Vayu	Vishal Dadlani, Shekhar Ravjiani	3:24
6.	"Nanki's Theme" (Music by Sanchit Balhara, Ankit Balhara)		Jonita Gandhi	2:09
Total length:				18:15
