= Raghava (film) =

- Official poster
- Directed by: Y. Nageswara Rao
- Written by: Satish Vegesna (dialogue)
- Screenplay by: Y. Nageswara Rao
- Produced by: L. B. Reddy; Suresh
- Starring: Suresh; Rajasree
- Cinematography: Poorna
- Music by: Shashi Preetam
- Release date: 1 February 2002
- Country: India
- Language: Telugu

Raghava is a 2002 Indian Telugu-language film directed by Y. Nageswara Rao and starring Suresh and Rajasree. The film was a box office failure.

== Cast ==
- Suresh as Raghava Reddy
- Rajasree as Anjali
- Kota Srinivasa Rao as Lakshma Reddy
- Ranganath as Veera Reddy
- Brahmanandam
- M. S. Narayana
- Chalapati Rao
- Ranganath
- Sudhakar
- Ali
- Mallikarjuna Rao
- G. V. Sudhakar Naidu
- Jeeva
- Gautam Raju
- Suma Kanakala
- Ramya Sri
- Padmajayanthi
- Sudeepa Pinky

== Soundtrack ==
The soundtrack was composed by Shashi Preetam.

Raghava

Soundtrack album by Shashi Preetam
- Released: 2001
- Genre: Feature film soundtrack
- Length: 20:53
- Language: Telugu
- Label: Lahari Music

Shashi Preetam chronology
Hands Up! (2000)	Raghava (2001)	Aamdani Atthanni Kharcha Rupaiya (2001)
External audio
- Raghava – Jukebox on YouTube

Track listing
No.	Title	Lyrics	Singer(s)	Length
1.	"Nuvve Nuvve"	Sahithi	Shashi Preetam, Mano, Usha	4:30
2.	"Prema Prema"	Bhuvana Chandra	Mano, Swarnalatha	4:47
3.	"Vamshoddara Vennela"	Vijayaditya	Mano, Usha	3:14
4.	"Maina Maina"	Vijayaditya	Kousalya, Sashi Preetam, Vijayaditya	3:57
5.	"Nuvve Nuvve (Pathos)"	Vijayaditya	Swarnalatha, Sashi Preetam	4:25
Total length:				20:53

== Reception ==
Jeevi of Idlebrain.com wrote that "Raghava is a badly made film with uninspiring story and direction". Gudipoodi Srihari of The Hindu wrote that "The film, with a focus on the faction fights in Rayalaseema, is rather disappointing".

A critic from Full Hyderabad wrote that "The film is nothing but an unabashed excuse to make money using what Tollywood considers the flavor of the season". Griddaluru Gopalrao of Zamin Ryot also a gave a negative review for the film, writing the film had a poor storyline and the director failed to handle the film's conflict properly.
