= Sashi Preetam =

Indian film composer and singer

- Born: 15 September 1970 (age 55); Kolkata
- Occupations: Music director, singer
- Years active: 1990 - present

Sashi Preetam is an Indian film composer and singer who primarily works in Telugu cinema. He rose to fame as a composer with the film Gulabi (1995), which became a major musical hit. He has composed background scores for many Telugu and Hindi films.

== Filmography ==
Year	Film	Language	Notes
1995	Gulabi	Telugu	
1997	Hello I Love You	Telugu	
1999	Samudram	Telugu	
2000	Hands Up	Telugu	
2000	College	Telugu	
2001	Aamdani Atthanni Kharcha Rupaiya	Hindi	BGM only
2002	Raghava	Telugu	
2002	16 December	Hindi	additional BGM only
2002	Friends	Telugu	
2008	Tathagatha Buddha	Hindi; Telugu	
2008	Mukhbiir	Hindi	1 song only
