= Hey Kameeni =

- Promotional release poster
- Directed by: Mani Shankar
- Written by: Anjali Joshi; Mani Shankar
- Produced by: Anjali Joshi; Mani Shankar
- Starring: Drishika Chander; Asheema Vardaan
- Production company: Bhairav Films
- Distributed by: JioCinema
- Release date: 22 December 2023
- Running time: 121 mins
- Country: India
- Language: Hindi

Hey Kameeni: Girl Gone Badass is an Indian Hindi-language drama film written and directed by Mani Shankar. Produced under Bhairav Films, it stars Drishika Chander and Asheema Vardaan. The film premiered on JioCinema on 22 December 2023.

== Cast ==
- Drishika Chander as Kamini
- Asheema Vardaan as Gauri
- Somanath Hotta as Tashi
- Avijit Dutt
- Supriya Karnik
- Adesh Pandit
- Bhuvan Kaila
- Siddharth Gollapudi

== Music ==
Hey Kameeni

Soundtrack album
- Released: 29 December 2023
- Genre: Feature film soundtrack
- Length: 25:52
- Language: Hindi
- Label: TuneCore

Track listing
No.	Title	Singer(s)	Length
1.	"Dil Awara"	Rinky Sharma	03:48
2.	"Dice"	Ken Goma	03:14
3.	"Tu Hai Kahan"	Rinky Sharma	03:46
4.	"Zindagi Ne Maari Palti"	Yogesh Verma	02:52
5.	"O Banane Wale"	Yogesh Verma	00:42
6.	"Dekho Na"	Jonathan Edward	04:19
7.	"Hey Kameeni (Title Track)"	Jonathan Edward	03:56
8.	"It's Now or Never"	Jonathan Edward	03:15
Total length:			25:52

== Reception ==
Archika Khurana of The Times of India gave the film 2/5 stars. Sonal Pandya of Times Now rated the film 2 stars out of 5.

== Accolades ==
Year	Award	Category	Recipients	Result	Ref.
2022	Hollywood International Diversity Film Festival	LGBTQ Perspective Award	Mani Shankar	Won	
2024	Indian Television Academy Awards	Popular Actress - OTT	Asheema Vardaan	Nominated	
