= A Simple Murder =

- Genre: Black comedy
- Written by: Akhilesh Jaiswal; Prateek Payodhi
- Directed by: Sachin Pathak
- Starring: Amit Sial; Ayaz Khan; Mohammed Zeeshan Ayyub; Priya Anand; Sushant Singh; Yashpal Sharma
- Music by: Karsh Kale
- Country of origin: India
- Original language: Hindi
- No. of seasons: 1
- No. of episodes: 7

Production
- Producer: Ajay G Rai
- Cinematography: S. Bharathwaaj
- Editor: Parikshhit Jha
- Production company: JAR Pictures

Original release
- Network: SonyLIV
- Release: 20 November 2020

A Simple Murder is a Hindi-language black comedy streaming television series directed by Sachin Pathak and produced by Ajay G Rai, starring Amit Sial, Ayaz Khan, Zeeshan Ayyub, Priya Anand, Sushant Singh, Yashpal Sharma and others.

== Cast ==
- Mohammed Zeeshan Ayyub as Manish
- Amit Sial as Santosh
- Ayaz Khan as Rahul
- Ankur Pandey as Usmaan
- Durgesh Kumar as Shankar
- Gopal Datt as Amit Mehta
- Priya Anand as Richa
- Sushant Singh as Himmat
- Tejasvi Singh Ahlawat as Priya Dawas
- Yashpal Sharma as Pandit
- Vedieka Dutt as Madhu
- Vijay Raaz as Narrator
- Vinay Varma as Pran Dawas
- Vikram Kochhar as Sub-Inspector Pratik Mishra

== Release ==
The trailer of the series released on 5 November 2020 and the series premiered on 20 November 2020 on SonyLIV.

== Episodes ==
| No. | Title | Directed by | Written by | Original release date |
|---|---|---|---|---|
| 1 | "Sanyog Ka Tadka" | Sachin Pathak | Akhilesh Jaiswal | 20 November 2020 |
| 2 | "Darte Hai Kya?" | Sachin Pathak | Akhilesh Jaiswal | 20 November 2020 |
| 3 | "Open And Shut Case" | Sachin Pathak | Akhilesh Jaiswal | 20 November 2020 |
| 4 | "Tu Kya Hai?" | Sachin Pathak | Akhilesh Jaiswal | 20 November 2020 |
| 5 | "Santa Ki Shakal" | Sachin Pathak | Akhilesh Jaiswal | 20 November 2020 |
| 6 | "Bachhe Kahaan Hain?" | Sachin Pathak | Akhilesh Jaiswal | 20 November 2020 |
| 7 | "Cappuccino ki Kasam" | Sachin Pathak | Akhilesh Jaiswal | 20 November 2020 |

== Reception ==
Shubhra Gupta for The Indian Express praised Sushant Singh's acting performance and wrote "The other half is taken up by the actors, and what a blast they are, especially Sushant Singh, who is a life-taker but also a closet poet, whose sense of rhythm is displayed with a nudge and wink. A few moments shared by Sial and Singh, where they are both riffing off each other, are delicious."

The Times of India gave negative review and wrote "it has landed miles away from where it was supposed to."

A critic from Rediff.com wrote "A Simple Murder gets trapped in its mesh of staggered sub-plots and too many characters."

Antara Kashyap for News18 rated the series 3.5 stars out of 5 and wrote "The show's strength lies in its comedy, and it has been marketed as such. However, when the genre reads ‘dark comedy’ instead of ‘thriller’, the audience keeps expecting that dark comedy. If the show was marketed as a thriller instead, the humour would have come as a wonderful surprise."

Firstpost wrote "The infantile scenes of bungled police work aside, director Sachin Pathak stays loyal to the genre. Over seven episodes we move out of Manish and Richa's 1BHK onto a crazy ride, with the myriad characters brought together by a couple of cases of mistaken identity, a missing bag of money, and blinding greed."

Scroll.in gave a mix review "Repetitive by design, unevenly paced and only sporadically funny, A Simple Murder would have been even less effective if it hadn't been for its cast, many of them seasoned professionals with the ability to make the ordinary appear special."

Cinema Express stated "Like every other recent Indian web series on major streaming platforms, this series too ends with a sort of cliffhanger. But unlike many of them, the cliffhanger here doesn't feel forced."
