= IIT Krishnamurthy =

2020 film directed by Sree Vardhan

- Official release poster
- Directed by: Sree Vardhan
- Written by: Sree Vardhan
- Produced by: Nekuri Prasad, Akki
- Starring: Dandamudi Pruthvi; Maira Doshi; Vinay Varma
- Cinematography: Yesu
- Edited by: Anil Kumar Pasala
- Music by: Naresh Kumaran
- Production companies: Crystolyte Media Creations; Akki Arts; Mango Mass Media
- Distributed by: Amazon Prime Video
- Release date: 10 December 2020
- Running time: 110 minutes
- Country: India
- Language: Telugu

IIT Krishnamurthy (transl. The Image of Lord Krishna student of IIT) is a 2020 Indian Telugu-language mystery film, written & Directed by Sree Vardhan and produced by Nekuri Prasad, Akki. Dandamudi Pruthvi and Maira Doshi play lead roles in the film, while Vinay Varma appears in a pivotal role. The film premiered on 10 December 2020 on Amazon Prime Video. The film was dubbed in Tamil, Kannada and Malayalam with the same name.

== Plot ==
Krishnamurthy, an IIT Bombay student, comes to Hyderabad and gets to know that his uncle is missing. Krishnamurthy then finds his missing uncle which is a mystery.

== Cast ==
- Dandamudi Pruthvi as Krishnamurthy
- Maira Doshi as Jahnavi
- Vinay Varma as ACP Vinay Varma
- Anand as Srinivas Rao
- Satya as Mahesh Babu
- Alok Jain as Swaminathan
- Banerjee as Auditor Narayana Rao
- Swarnakanth as PA Kiran
- Vinodh Nuvvula as Siddharth
- Chitti Babu as CBI Officer
- Bala as Mrs. Srinivasa Rao
- Pravalika Reddy as Vidha, Jahnavi's friend
- Sahithi Dasari as News Anchor

== Music ==
IIT Krishnamurthy

Soundtrack album by Naresh Kumaran
- Released: 12 December 2020 (Jukebox)
- Recorded: 2020
- Studio: The Sound Dockk Studio (Hyderabad)
- Genre: Feature film soundtrack
- Length: 12:39
- Language: Telugu
- Label: Mango Music
- Producer: Naresh Kumaran

Naresh Kumaran chronology
Run (2020)	IIT Krishnamurthy (2020)	Gaami (2024)
External audio
- Audio Jukebox on YouTube

All music is composed by Naresh Kumaran.

Telugu (OST)
No.	Title	Lyrics	Singer(s)	Length
1.	"Megham Tho Megham"	Ramanjhaneyulu Sankarpu	Yazin Nizar	4:21
2.	"Samayam Jaripe"	Manapaka Nagarjuna	Hema Chandra	3:22
3.	"Naa Prathi Kala"	Ramanjhaneyulu Sankarpu	Sreerama Chandra, Harini Ivaturi	4:40
4.	"IIT K Missing Hip Hop Song (Promotional)"	Asura	The Nawab Gang	3:49

== Reception ==
Thadhagath Pathi of The Times of India wrote that "IIT Krishnamurthy is a film that will not put you to sleep and qualifies as an attempt that is appreciable. To know if an IITian is truly brainier than the most experienced cop is something you need to watch."

Cinema Express wrote that "With patchy narration, which lacks fluidity, and no impacting emotional anchors either, the film reaches a crucial moment when the knots are released. The reveal is one that entirely depends on chance rather than on acumen of the supposed mastermind — it is also full of flaws. Why was it important to overemphasise that the talented, brilliant Krishnamurthy is from IIT? Couldn’t someone from another institution be just as crafty and clever? Considering the emotional anchor that the film poses to have, wouldn’t something on the lines of ‘Deepam Krishnamurthy’ work better as the title and the story's emblem, without undermining said emotional connect? The only ray of light is Satya Akkala's comedy. It's a pity that his excellent one-liners are almost overshadowed by the cloud of dismay that the rest of the film evokes."

Vishal Menon of Film Companion wrote that "What doesn’t help either is the film’s over-reliance on the big ending. It’s like the makers decided to explain everything with one long stretch of dialogue. So if something hadn’t made sense until then, they’re just going to attribute even that to the hero’s genius. There’s no room for errors in Krishnamurthy’s plans and the sequence of things that has to fall right in place for his desired result seems annoyingly implausible. In other places, details about financial fraud and the whole police operation are too simplistic to be taken seriously. "
