= Deepti =

Given name

- Gender: Female
- Language: Indian

Origin
- Meaning: "the ray of hope " "a bright flame that blinds the eye"
- Region of origin: India

Other names
- Related names: Deepa, Deepthi, Dipti, Deepthy

Deepti (Nepali: दीप्ति) is a Hindu feminine given name, which means "the ray of hope". It basically means "a bright flame that blinds the eye". In Sanskrit, Deepti, means "light", "glow", "shine", "brilliant" or "a person who spreads light to people around". It is also known by the spelling Deepthi/Deepthy in south India and Deepti/Dipti in north India.

== List of people with the given name Deepti ==
- Deepti Bhatnagar (born 1967), Indian actress
- Deepti Daryanani, actress, singer, and dancer
- Deepti Menon, Indian author
- Deepti Naval (born 1952), Indian actress, director, writer, painter, and photographer
- Deepti Sati (born 1995), Indian actress and model
- Deepti Sharma (born 1997), Indian cricketer

== See also ==
- Deepthi (disambiguation)
