= Deepthi Kumara Gunarathne =

Sri Lankan politician

Deepthi Kumara Gunarathne is a Sri Lankan activist, critic, politician, and philosopher. He is the general secretary of the Samabima Party.
