= Knock Out (2010 film) =

2010 Indian film by Mani Shankar

- Theatrical release poster
- Directed by: Mani Shankar
- Written by: Mani Shankar; Shiraz Ahmed
- Produced by: Sohail Maklai; Parekh Amitabh
- Starring: Sanjay Dutt; Irrfan Khan; Kangana Ranaut
- Cinematography: Natarajan Subramaniam
- Edited by: Bunty Nagi; Chandan Arora
- Music by: Songs: Gourov Dasgupta; Score: Sanjay Wadrekar; Atul Raninga
- Production companies: Sohail Maklai Productions; AAP Entertainment
- Release date: 15 October 2010
- Running time: 116 minutes
- Country: India
- Language: Hindi
- Box office: ₹62 million (US$650,000)

Knock Out is a 2010 Indian Hindi-language action thriller film directed by Mani Shankar. The film stars Sanjay Dutt, Irrfan Khan and Kangana Ranaut, and is an unofficial remake of American film Phone Booth. In October 2010, the Bombay High Court ordered the film's producers to pay a portion of their revenues to 20th Century Fox, who own the rights to Phone Booth. The film was released on 15 October 2010, and was a commercial failure.

== Plot ==
Bachubhai (Irrfan Khan) has come to a phone booth to make a call. He is interrupted by a man who interrupts him again. Bachubhai tells him to stop interrupting. While moving out of the phone booth after the call, the phone rings. Bachubhai picks up the call only to get surprised by an unknown caller who ensures that Bachubhai does not leave the phone booth until his motive of calling is achieved. Another man interrupts, who is shot dead by that unknown person from a faraway building. After seeing the incident, the police, the public, and the news reporter, Nidhi Srivastav (Kangana Ranaut), arrive. Everyone is seeing everything, as Bachubhai has been told to do what the person on the phone call says or he will shoot him. Later, police officer Sushant Singh is transferred, and another encounter specialist has been called. Meanwhile, Bachubhai, who is working for a corrupt politician who has 320 billion black money, has been told to transfer the money on a government account to give back the money to the public. Bachubhai does everything as the phone caller says. At the end of the movie, the money has been transferred to the public account, and it is revealed that Veer Vijay Singh (Sanjay Dutt) is a Chief of Investigation Bureau. Bachubhai, after transferring the money, nothing happens to him.

== Cast ==
- Sanjay Dutt as Veer Vijay Singh, Chief of IB / Colonel Gill
- Irrfan Khan as Bachchoo Bhai / Tony Khosla
- Kangana Ranaut as Nidhi Srivastava, an India TV reporter
- Gulshan Grover as Bapuji
- Rukhsar Rehman as Lakshmi Khosla, Tony's wife
- Sushant Singh as Inspector Vikram
- Asif Basra as Raghav
- Bikramjeet Kanwarpal as Nidhi's boss
- Kurush Deboo as Sandwichwala
- Abhay Shukla as Prithvi
- Shankar Sachdeva as Mishra
- Shriya Sharma as Sweety Khosla, Tony's daughter
- Naseer Abdullah as Bhalla
- Namrata Thapa as Roshni
- Apoorva Lakhia as Ranvir Singh
- Ashraful Haque as Junkie
- Shreya Narayan as Jesse
- Aparna as Bharti
- Rajendra Jadhav as Gundurao
- Vinay Verma as Commissioner
- M D Pasha as Suvarna
- Hussain Shaikh as Party President
- Gary Warren D'souza as Swiss Bank Manager
- Randheer Nahar as Pandey
- Shivraj as RBI Officer

== Controversy ==
The film was initially rumored to be a remake of the American film Phone Booth, which the producer Sohail Maklai denied. Shankar also denied the charges while accusing Phone Booth itself of being a copy of Liberty Stands Still. 20th Century Fox filed a complaint against the makers of Knock Out before the film's release. The Bombay High Court had initially passed an injunction against the film's release after watching both the films. However, the producers were allowed to release the film on appeal, and deposited INR 1.5 crore to the court.

The matter was reheard in March 2013, with the court decreeing the case and awarding INR 1.25 crore to Fox, further telling the producers of Phone Booth to not exploit their film in any manner whatsoever from 5 March 2013 onwards.

== Reception ==
Nikhat Kazmi of The Times of India gave the film 3 stars out of 5 stars, noting "all the action transpiring around the phone booth" to be the only similarity with Phone Booth. Taran Adarsh from Bollywood Hungama gave the film 2.5 stars out of 5, similarly pointing out that "what follows after a point bears no resemblance to that film (Phone Booth)", and also found it similar to A Wednesday in spite of their different storylines. He praised the focused plot and the finale, while criticizing the film's occasional repetitiveness. Patcy N. from Rediff.com gave the film 1.5 stars out of 5, praising Irrfan Khan's performance, while criticizing the climax and the overall execution.

== Soundtrack ==
The film's music was composed by Gourov Dasgupta, with a background score by Atul Raninga and Sanjay Wandrekar. The soundtrack has five original tunes, one remix, and an alternate version of one song.

#	Song	Singers	Lyrics	Music director
1.	"Knock Out" Title track	Vishal Dadlani	Panchhi Jalonvi	Gourav Dasgupta
2.	"Khushnuma Sa"	Rahat Fateh Ali Khan	Panchhi Jalonvi	Gourav Dasgupta
3.	"Hungama"	Sunidhi Chauhan	Panchhi Jalonvi	Gourav Dasgupta
4.	"Maula"	KK	Panchhi Jalonvi	Gourav Dasgupta
5.	"Khushnuma Sa Woh"	Krishna Beura	Shelle	Gourav Dasgupta
6.	"Hungama" (Remix)	Sunidhi Chauhan	Panchhi Jalonvi	Gourav Dasgupta
7.	"Gangubai Pe Aai Jawani"	Sumitra Iyer, Sanjeev-Darshan	Sameer	Sanjeev-Darshan
