= Deepti Menon =

Indian author

Deepti Menon is an Indian author. She is the author of Arms and the Woman and Shadow in the Mirror. She was also the contributing author of Crossed and Knotted, which made it to the Limca Book of Records.

== Career ==
Deepti Menon began her career as an English teacher for students at middle and high schools. Her work as an author and writer formally began after she wrote Deeparadhana, a compilation of poems, followed by Arms and the Woman in 2002, which was published by Rupa Publications. Later, in 2014, Deepti contributed to two anthologies, 21 Tales to Tell and Chronicles of Urban Nomads, besides writing for Mango Chutney, as well. In 2015, she contributed to Defiant Dreams and When they Spoke. She was also the contributing author of Crossed and Knotted, which made it to the Limca Book of Records, and A Little Chorus of Love.

== Selected works ==
- Arms and the Woman (2002)
- Deeparadhana (2002)
- Shadow in the Mirror (2016)
- Classic Tales From the Panchatantra (4 books)
- Classic Tales From the Panchatantra (Consolidated Volume)
- Where Shadows Follow -Tales That Twist and Turn
- Shadows Never Lie

=== Contributing author ===
- 21 Tales to Tell (2014)
- Chronicles of Urban Nomads (2014)
- Mango Chutney (2014)
- Upper Cut (2014)
- Crossed and Knotted (2015)
- Defiant Dreams (2015)
- A Little Chorus of Love (2015)
- When they Spoke (2016)
- Love - Lots of Volatile Emotions
- Rudraksha
- Grandpa Tales
- Tonight Is The Night
- The Naked Indian Woman
- The Readomania Book of Horror
- The Readomania Book of Romance
- The Readomania Book of Folk Tales
- The Readomania Book of Historical Fiction
- The Readomania Book of Indian Mythology
