= Rajesh Dhabre =

Indian musician

Rajesh Dhabre IRS
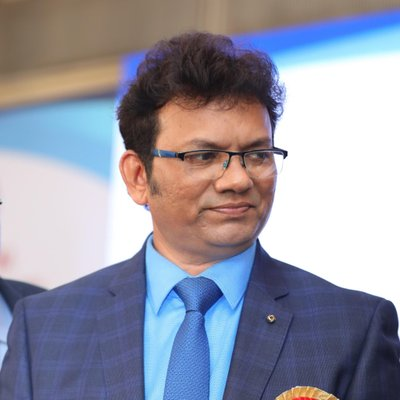

Commissioner of Customs- Madras & Bombay. Ministry of Finance, Govt. of India
- In office 2022-Present

Narcotics Commissioner at Central Bureau of Narcotics- Head Quarters 2020-2022 Managing Director at Sant Rohidas Leather Industries and Charmakar Development Corporation - Maharashtra Director General at Babasaheb Ambedkar Research and Training Institute, Pune. - Ministry of Social Justice and Special Assistance, Govt. of Maharastra. 2016-2020 Joint Commissioner of Marine and Preventive at Central Excise and Service Tax. Personal and Management, Central Intelligence Unit and Special Investigation and Intelligence Branch, Air Cargo, Mumbai 2008-2016 Assistant Commissioner at Central Excise Divisions & Audit Deputy Commissioner of International Airport Hyderabad. 2002-2008

Personal details
- Born: Nagpur, Maharashtra
- Website: www.rajeshdhabre.com

Rajesh Fattesingh Dhabre is a senior Indian Revenue Service Officer, who has the held high profile positions such as the Narcotics Commissioner of India - Central Bureau of Narcotics - Government of India and many more.

Having a career span of more than 2 decades in service and many high profile cases to his credit. He was invited in the House of Lords in the United Kingdom as a special guest. He was also a part of the anti drugs awareness campaign along with United Nations Economic and Social Council.

He has served as the Director General at BARTI. He is also an established Author, Singer, Composer, Impact speaker and Transformation Coach. He is from the city of Nagpur,

== Compositions ==
Rajesh Dhabre he composes Ambedkarite and Buddhist devotional music, the album, Buddha Hi Buddha Hai(2010), was the first of its kind to have songs composed in Bollywood style. Some of the songs were sung by famous singers. Other songs were sung by Dhabre and by his wife, Bhavana Rajesh Dhabre. The title track "Buddha Hi Buddha Hai," sung by Sonu Nigam, gained much popularity.

In 2013, he released his second album Siddhartha The Lotus Blossom. The album features the chants "Buddham Saranam Gachchami" sung by the Lata Mangeshkar. The album was launched by LM Music, a company owned by Mangeshkar. One of the songs on the album was "Gautam Se Sajaye Duniya."

His next album is about the life of Babasaheb Ambedkar and will be called Ambedkar The True Son of India. The album brings out the thought of Ambedkar's thoughts involving issues of national and social importance. The album will be released on 6 December 2015 on the occasion of "Mahparinirvan Din" of Dr. Babasaheb Ambedkar.

== Albums ==
=== Sarnang (2015) ===
Bollywood's first ever tribute to Dr. Babasaheb Ambedkar-2016 on his 125th birth anniversary.

Track No.	Title/Compose	Performer	Time
1.	"Tu Bodhisatva"	Rajesh Dhabre	
2.	"Bhoomiputra"	Shankar Mahadevan and Bhavna	
3.	"Mantrijee"	Shaan	
4.	"Pragati Ki Raah"	Shreya Ghoshal	
5.	"Gyandhaara"	Hariharan	
6.	"Sanginee"	Shankar Mahadevan	
7.	"Voh The Bhimrao"	Sukhvinder Singh	

=== Siddhartha : The Lotus Blossoms (2013) ===
Track No.	Track name	Performer
1.	"Buddhang Saranang Gachhami"	Lata Mangeshkar
2.	"Sahare Jo Pragya Ke Chale"	Asha Bhosle
3.	"Ehipassiko, Aao Dekhona"	Sonu Nigam
4.	"Mann Shuddha Tann Buddha"	Shankar Mahadevan
5.	Jaage Jaage Mann Mera Gautama	Hariharan
6.	"Buddha Hi Buddha Hai"	Rajesh Dhabre
7.	"Anugrahit Ho Jeevan Uska"	Anup Jalota
8.	"Mai'n Ishwar Nahi Parmeshwar Nahi"	Pankaj Udhas
9.	"Mai'n Yashodhara"	Bhavana Rajesh
10.	"Sun Sun Mann Ki Dhun"	Suresh Wadkar
11.	"Gautam Se Sajaye Duniya"	Shaan

=== Buddha Hi Buddha Hai (2010) ===
Track No.	Title/Compose	Performer	Time
1.	"Buddha Hi Buddha Hai"	Sonu Nigam	7:52
2.	"Buddha Ki Jivani Tum Suno"	Rajesh Dhabre (RFD)	8.15
3.	"Suno Re Hath Jodo Milke Karo Vandan"	Dr Bhavna / Shankar Mahadevan / RFD	7:41
4.	"Trishna Mein Rog Hai"	Shankar Mahadevan	5:07
5.	"Bandhubhav Har Ek Hriday Mein"	Alka Yagnik	4:45
6.	"Aag Se Aag Kaise Bujhegi Bhai"	Hariharan	6:15
7.	"Badal Ke Bin Paani Nahi"	Suresh Wadkar	5:52
8.	"Sukhkar Hai Buddha Ka Janam"	Suresh Wadkar	5:11
