= Rudraksh (film) =

2004 Indian film by Mani Shankar

- Directed by: Mani Shankar
- Written by: Mani Shankar
- Produced by: Dr. Manmohan Shetty; Sohail Maklai
- Starring: Sanjay Dutt; Suniel Shetty; Bipasha Basu; Isha Koppikar
- Narrated by: Amitabh Bachchan
- Cinematography: T. Surendra Reddy
- Edited by: Mani Shankar
- Music by: Shankar–Ehsaan–Loy; Shashi Preetam; Vishal–Shekhar
- Distributed by: Karma Entertainment
- Release date: 13 February 2004
- Running time: 143 minutes
- Country: India
- Language: Hindi
- Budget: ₹12 crore
- Box office: ₹9.87 crore

Rudraksh is a 2004 Indian Hindi-language science fantasy action film directed by Mani Shankar. The film stars Sanjay Dutt, Suniel Shetty, Bipasha Basu, Isha Koppikar and Kabir Bedi. The film has many references to the epic poem Ramayana ("The Path of Rāma"). The film released on 13 February 2004 to negative reviews by critics and was declared as a disaster at the box office.

== Plot ==
Dr. Gayatri Singh is an Indian American paranormal researcher at the University of California, researching esoteric practices such as voodoo, spirit possession, magic, and healing powers. She seeks the hidden knowledge that goes into such practices, the knowledge that cannot be explained by science or logic.

Her search for answers brings her and her team of scientists to India. She comes across Varun Bhushan, a man who is gifted with special intuitive and healing powers, which he claims to have developed through meditation. He is a blend of Indian philosophy and modern culture, a master at martial arts, and a devotee of Hanuman. He worships and trains by day while working as a bouncer at a club by night. Gayatri is immediately impressed by Varun's powers to take away pain and disease from people and cure them. He becomes the subject of her study.

After a few experiments by Gayatri, Varun has an insight into the existence of a hidden dark power. He explains that the force is linked to Ravana's Rudraksha, which is hidden away from the world. This is not a normal Rudraksh; it carries in its seed the powers that can transmute humans into new species. The bearer of this Rudraksha will have supernatural powers beyond imagination. In the language of science, it is a 'multi-dimensional hologram' in the form of a seed. Meanwhile, Bhuria mentally communicates with Varun, so they can share their abilities since neither of them can utilize the full power of the Rudraksha alone. Varun refuses, but Bhuria continues his attempts to join their powers and manipulate Varun.

Gayatri finds a set of strange words that cause changes in people when spoken. She tests the effects of those sounds on a rat and notices strange mutations and changes in the functioning of the rat's body. Gayatri's research assistant Suzy hears those sounds directly, becomes possessed, and starts working for Bhuria. Suzy tries to kill Gayatri, but Varun overpowers her and saves her, after which Suzy dies while trying to escape.

Varun and Gayatri thus set out to discover this Rudraksha, the reality of Bhuria Kumar, and find certain answers for Varun. Their perilous journey leaves through the most rugged terrains of the Himalayas to the mysterious ruins of the legendary King Ravana's palaces in Yala, Sri Lanka.

He thus finds how Bhuria Kumar, a poor but wild and arrogant labor contractor in the excavation team of the Rudraksha, transformed into a powerful Rakshasha and possessor of supernatural powers, that the words spoken by the madman were an ancient verse, a Rakshasha mantra, and that the real aim of Bhuria Kumar is to use the Rudraksha and Rakshasha mantra for spreading evil and hatred in the world, thus effectively restoring the rule of rakshashas once more.

Thus, once more, it becomes a battle of good vs. evil, where either must overcome the other. End of the day, the fear-maker monsters are always unliked.

== Cast ==
- Sanjay Dutt as Varun Bhushan
- Suniel Shetty as Bhuria Kumar
- Isha Koppikar as Lalli, Bhuria Kumar's girlfriend and a contract killer.
- Bipasha Basu as Dr. Gayatri Singh
- Kabir Bedi as Pandit Ved Bhushan, a saint and Varun's father.
- Farhad Shahnawaz as in Supporting Role
- Vinay Varma as Mantrik
- Agnes Darenius as Suzy, Dr. Gayatri's research assistant
- Negar Khan
- Virendra Saxena as security guard
- Prabhudeva as Item Number in Ishq Khudaai
- Ganesh Acharya as himself in the song "Ishq Khudai" (special appearance)

== Soundtrack ==
Rudraksh

Soundtrack album by Shankar–Ehsaan–Loy
- Released: 12 December 2003 (India)
- Genre: Feature film soundtrack
- Label: T-Series
- Producers: Nitin Manmohan; Sohail Maklai

Shankar–Ehsaan–Loy chronology
Kal Ho Naa Ho (2003)	Rudraksh (2003)	Kyun! Ho Gaya Na... (2004)

#	Song	Singer(s)	Duration	Composers
1	"Ishq Khudai"	Krishna, Mahalakshmi Iyer, Shankar Mahadevan, Shweta Pandit	5:21	Shankar–Ehsaan–Loy
2	"Ishq Hai Nasha Nasha"	Shaan, Sunidhi Chauhan	4:13	Vishal–Shekhar
3	"Dil Ki Aahein"	KK, K. S. Chitra	5:03	Shashi Preetam
4	"Kya Dard Hai"	Instrumental	5:46	Shankar–Ehsaan–Loy
5	"Rudraksh"	Kunal Ganjawala	4:01	Shankar–Ehsaan–Loy
6	"Rak-rak-rak"	Shankar Mahadevan, Anuradha Paudwal, Blaaze	6:17	Shankar–Ehsaan–Loy
7	"Ishq Khudai" - Remix	Krishna, Mahalakshmi Iyer, Shankar Mahadevan, Shweta Pandit	8:02	Shankar–Ehsaan–Loy
8	"Bole - Dole"	KK, K. S. Chitra, Usha Uthup, Vijay Prakash	4:21	Shashi Preetam
9	"Kya Dard Hai"	Richa Sharma, Shankar Mahadevan	5:40	Shankar–Ehsaan–Loy

== Reception ==
=== Critical response ===
Rudraksh opened to a negative reception by critics. Taran Adarsh of IndiaFM rated the film 1.5 out of 5, stating, "Rudraksh rests on Sanjay Dutt and Suniel Shetty's shoulders and both enact their parts with utmost sincerity. Dutt seems to be enjoying his work and it shows on screen. Shetty too is up to the mark. The get-ups of both Dutt and Shetty would also be appreciated. Bipasha Basu does an okay job, while Isha Koppikar leaves an impression in a negative role. Kabir Bedi is alright. Nigar Khan sizzles in the dance track. On the whole, Rudraksh proves the adage 'All that glitters is not gold' absolutely right. The film has gloss, no soul, which will take a toll on its overall business." Anupama Chopra of India Today wrote, "What has Mani Shankar been smoking? That is the first question that comes to mind as you watch Rudraksh, a deliriously bad Ramayan-meets-Indiana Jones-meets-Matrix saga."

Manish Gajjar of BBC.com wrote, "In trying to concentrate on the special effects, the director fails to pay any attention to the screenplay. This is reflected in the finished product. Overall, Rudraksh is a film which only entertains in parts. With a half baked screenplay, it would be interesting to see how it fares at the UK box office." Ronjita Kulkarni of Rediff.com wrote, "Rudraksh seems too ambitious a film for the director. In his attempt to explore mythology and the supernatural, the director does not seem to have known what to focus on. The characters are half-baked and look silly. Dutt looks uncomfortable in some of his meditation scenes and fights. If this movie was supposed to have thrills, there are none."

=== Box office ===
Rudraksh collected ₹1.10 crore on its first day, followed by ₹1.17 crore on its second day and ₹1.30 crore on its third day, taking its opening weekend collection to ₹3.57 crore.

The film collected a total of ₹5.12 crore in its opening week, and ended up with a domestic lifetime collection of ₹5.97 crore, and was declared a as a "Disaster" by Box Office India.

== See also ==
- Science fiction film of India
