= 16 December (film) =

2002 film by Mani Shankar

- Directed by: Mani Shankar
- Written by: Mani Shankar
- Produced by: Anjali Joshi; Arunima Roy
- Starring: Milind Soman; Danny Denzongpa; Gulshan Grover; Dipannita Sharma; Sushant Singh; Aditi Govitrikar
- Cinematography: Ajayan Vincent
- Edited by: Mani Shankar
- Music by: Karthik Raja; Vikesh Mehta
- Production company: iDream Production
- Distributed by: iDream Production
- Release date: 22 March 2002
- Running time: 158 minutes
- Country: India
- Language: Hindi

16 December is a 2002 Indian Hindi-language action thriller film directed by Mani Shankar, based on a plot to destroy the capital city of India, New Delhi with a nuclear bomb on 16 December 2001 – 30 years after the surrender of Pakistan at the end of the Indo-Pakistani War of 1971. The film stars Milind Soman, Danny Denzongpa, Gulshan Grover, Dippannita Sharma, Sushant Singh, and Aditi Govitrikar. It was released on 22 March 2002, and received positive reviews from critics.

The film's title comes from the historical date of 16 December 1971 (which is also Bangladesh's Victory Day), commemorating the day Pakistan signed the document of Liberation of Bangladesh.

== Plot ==
Vikram, Sheeba and Victor are Indian Revenue Service officers belonging to the Department of Revenue Intelligence and have been removed from service, owing to their killing of a corrupt senior officer. They are hired back by their chief Vir Vijay Singh to investigate a series of large money launderings. Through the use of modern technology, they discover that the money is being transferred to a Swiss Bank account. One of their agents tracks down MP Shyam Manohar Kalia, from whose account the money is being transferred. Before the MP can reveal any name, his account is hacked, and all his money is transferred, seeing which the MP dies of heart failure.

The team travels to New Zealand, where Vikram honey-traps a Swiss Bank employee Sonal Joshi to find the details of the transactions. They come to know that the money has been transferred to an international terrorist organization named Kaala Khanjar. This organization has sold a Russian-made nuclear bomb to Pakistani army general turned terrorist, Dost Khan.

Dost Khan orchestrates an attack on Vir Vijay Singh through his subordinate Mir Zafar's men. However, Vir Vijay Singh is saved, and one of the attackers is caught. On interrogating him, the group learns that the bomb has already reached Delhi, and that Dost Khan plans to explode the bomb on 16 December, the same day on which Pakistan surrendered unconditionally to India during the Indo-Pakistani War of 1971.

By taking help from the innumerable number of beggars in the city and by using advanced radiation sensors, the exact location of the bomb is revealed. Vir Vijay Singh's men secretly kill all the terrorists guarding the bomb. However, Dost Khan is alerted, and he sets the bomb to explode. It can be diffused only by the code "Dulhan Ki Vidaai Ka Waqt Badalna Hai" exclusively in Dost Khan's voice. The group synthesizes this code by joining bits and fragments of Dost Khan's speech. Ultimately, the bomb is diffused and Dost Khan is arrested. The film ends on the note that this is only the beginning, and there is still a long way to go in the fight against terrorism.

== Cast ==
- Milind Soman as ex Indian Army Lt.Vikram deputized in IRS / Vijay Chauhan
- Danny Denzongpa as Major General Vir Vijay Singh deputized in IRS
- Gulshan Grover as ex Pakistan Army Lt. General Dost Khan, former Inter-Service Intelligence
- Dipannita Sharma as Indian Army Lt. Sheeba deputized in IRS
- Sushant Singh as Indian Army Lt. Victor deputized in IRS
- Aditi Gowitrikar as Sonal Joshi
- Vinay Varma as Shiv Charan Shukla

== Soundtrack ==
16 December

Soundtrack album by Karthik Raja & Vikesh Mehta
- Released: 16 December 2001
- Recorded: Vikesh Recorded his parts in Hyderabad yrar 2000,
- Venue: Banjara Hill Hyd
- Genre: Feature film soundtrack
- Label: Universal Music Group
- Producer: Karthik Raja, Vikesh Mehta

Karthik Raja & Vikesh Mehta chronology
Mitr, My Friend (2001)	16 December (2001)	Album (2002)

The music was composed by Karthik Raja and Vikesh Mehta. In the credits, only Karthik Raja is credited while in audio soundtrack releases, both are listed.

#	Title	Singer(s)	Notes
1	"Dil Mera Ek Tara"	Sadhana Sargam	
2	"Main Cheez Badi Hoon Chaalu"	Shaan	
3	"I Am A Cool Cat"	Shaan, Subhiksha	
4	"Title Music"		
5	"Dil Ye Tera"	KK	Music by Vikesh Mehta
6	"Dhuan Dhuan Sa"	Milind Soman, Chitra Sivaraman	
7	"Chim Chimiya"	Sapna Awasthi	Music by Vikesh Mehta

== Reception ==
Ronjita Kulkarni of Rediff.com gave the movie 5/5 stars and wrote, "For a first-timer, director Mani Shankar does a valiant job with 16 December. It has four songs, three of which appear in the background, but it certainly does not follow the routine song-and-dance formula. 16 December entertains as well makes you think". Taran Adarsh of Bollywood Hungama gave the movie 4/5 stars and wrote, "The film does have a love angle though there is no undue focus on the romantic couple. Now for the film. In 16 December, Mani Shankar has tried to explore white-collar crime. The premise being, millions of rupees leave the Indian shores daily to Swiss bank accounts. The account holders always remain a secret. What the director tries to do is trace this movement of money from the grass-roots level". Rachit Gupta of Filmfare rated the movie 4/5 stars, stating, "16 December moves at a brisk pace. Mani Shankar does not waste time on unnecessary details. The film requires a fair amount of concentration to understand the chain of events". DNA gave the movie 5/5 stars and said that, one of the best Hindi spy films that had ever come out, it is India's equivalent to Brian De Palma's Mission: Impossible.

== See also ==
- Bangladesh Liberation War
- Indo-Pakistani War of 1971
- List of films about 1971 India-Pakistan war
