= Divyang Thakkar =

Indian actor (born c. 1986)

- Born: Mumbai, Maharashtra, India
- Occupations: Actor; film director; screenwriter
- Years active: 2011–present

Divyang Thakkar is an Indian actor, screenwriter, and film director who works in Gujarati and Hindi films.

== Early and personal life ==
Divyang Thakkar was born and raised in Mumbai, Maharashtra, India. He studied filmmaking at Whistling Woods International Institute in Mumbai.

== Career ==
Thakkar made his acting debut in the 2012 satire Kevi Rite Jaish directed by Abhishek Jain. The film was a critical and commercial success. Divyang received the Gujarat State Award for Best Actor for this performance in the film. They later reunited for Bey Yaar (2015) which also was a critical and commercial success. He acted as one of the six leads in an ALTBalaji web series Boygiri (2017). In 2022, he turned writer-director for Yash Raj Films with Jayeshbhai Jordaar starring Ranveer Singh.

== Filmography ==
=== Film ===
Year	Film	Role	Language	Notes	Ref.
2011	Kalapaani		Hindi	Short film	
2012	Kevi Rite Jaish	Harish Bachubhai Patel	Gujarati		
2012	Chanakya Speaks	Aamir Maqvi	English		
2014	Bey Yaar	Chintan Bhatt	Gujarati		
2016	Khaatti Meethi Setting		Gujarati		
2019	Chasani	Rahul	Gujarati		
2022	Jayeshbhai Jordaar	—	Hindi	Directorial debut	
2022	Tu Rajee Re		Gujarati		

=== Web series ===
Year	Title	Role	Platform	Ref.
2017	Boygiri	Pragnesh Wakharia	ALTBalaji	
