= Rana Daggubati filmography =

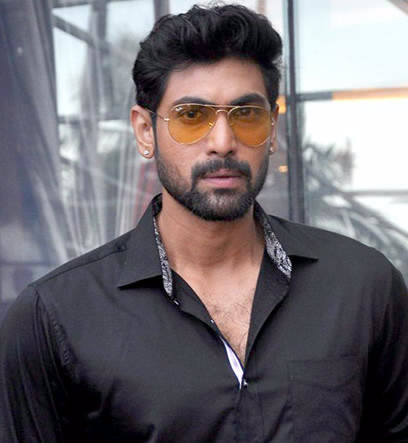
Daggubati in 2015

Rana Daggubati is an Indian actor, producer, television personality, visual effects co-ordinator, and an entrepreneur known primarily for his work in Telugu-language films, in addition to Hindi and Tamil language films. He is best known for his roles Bhallaladeva in Baahubali: The Beginning (2015) and Baahubali 2: The Conclusion (2017), Radha Jogendra in Nene Raju Nene Mantri (2017) and Arjun Verma in Ghazi (2017). His other successful films include Leader (2010), Krishnam Vande Jagadgurum (2012).

== Overview ==
Beside being an actor, Rana is also a successful producer and a visual effects coordinator. His visual effects company Spirit Media P. Limited, that specialised in animation and VFX, produced special effects for over 70 films. He is one of the key individuals of the Suresh Productions. Rana has produced the children's film, Bommalata in 2004. The film won the National Film Award for Best Feature Film in Telugu. Rana has recorded the Telugu version of the song "Lights Camera Action" along with Hiphop Tamizha and Roll Rida, for the 2019 Tamil film Action. He has also appeared in the web series Social, that premiered on Viu.

== Films ==
Key
†	Denotes films that have not yet been released

=== As actor ===
List of Rana Daggubati film acting credits
Year	Title	Role	Language	Notes	Ref.
2010	Leader	Arjun Prasad	Telugu		
2011	Dum Maaro Dum	DJ Joaquim "Joki" Fernandes	Hindi		
2011	Nenu Naa Rakshasi	Abhimanyu	Telugu		
2012	Naa Ishtam	Ganesh	Telugu		
2012	Department	Shiv Narayan	Hindi		
2012	Krishnam Vande Jagadgurum	B. Tech Babu	Telugu		
2013	Yeh Jawaani Hai Deewani	Vikram Sahai	Hindi	Cameo appearances	
2013	Something Something	Himself	Telugu	Cameo appearances	
2013	Arrambam	Sanjay	Tamil	Cameo appearances	
2015	Baby	Jai Singh Rathore	Hindi		
2015	Dongaata	Himself	Telugu	Cameo appearances	
2015	Krishnamma Kalipindi Iddarini	Himself	Telugu	Cameo appearances	
2015	Baahubali: The Beginning	Bhallaladeva	Telugu	Bilingual film	
2015	Baahubali: The Beginning	Palvaalthevan	Tamil	Bilingual film	
2015	Rudhramadevi	Chalukya Veerabhadra	Telugu		
2015	Size Zero	Himself	Telugu	Bilingual film; cameo appearance	
2015	Inji Iduppazhagi	Himself	Tamil	Bilingual film; cameo appearance	
2016	Bangalore Naatkal	Shiva Prasad	Tamil		
2017	Ghazi	Arjun Verma	Telugu	Bilingual film	
2017	The Ghazi Attack	Arjun Verma	Hindi	Bilingual film	
2017	Baahubali 2: The Conclusion	Bhallaladeva (Telugu) / Palvaalthevan (Tamil)	Telugu / Tamil	Partially reshot in Tamil	
2017	Nene Raju Nene Mantri	Radha Jogendra	Telugu		
2018	Welcome to New York	Himself	Hindi	Cameo appearance	
2019	N.T.R: Kathanayakudu	N. Chandrababu Naidu	Telugu	Cameo appearance	
2019	N.T.R: Mahanayukudu	N. Chandrababu Naidu	Telugu		
2019	Housefull 4	Raja Gama, Pappu Rangeela	Hindi	Dual role	
2019	Enai Noki Paayum Thota	Himself	Tamil	Cameo	
2021	Kaadan	Veerabarathi "Kaadan"	Tamil	Trilingual film	
2021	Aranya	Narendra Bhupathi "Aranya"	Telugu	Trilingual film	
2021	Haathi Mere Saathi	Sumitranandan "Bandev"	Hindi	Trilingual film	
2022	Bheemla Nayak	Daniel "Danny" Shekar	Telugu		
2022	Virata Parvam	Comrade Ravanna	Telugu		
2022	1945	Adhi	Tamil		
2023	Spy	Arjun	Telugu	Cameo appearance	
2024	Vettaiyan	Natraj "Nat" Shanmugam	Tamil		
2025	Mirai	Mysterious man	Telugu	Cameo appearance	
2025	Baahubali: The Epic	Bhallaladeva	Telugu	Combined re-release version of The Beginning and The Conclusion	
2025	Kaantha	Inspector Devaraj alias "Phoenix"	Tamil	Also producer	
2026	Parasakthi	Michael Reddy	Tamil	Cameo appearance	
2026	Baahubali: The Torch Bearer	Himself	Telugu	Netflix Documentary series	

=== As producer ===
List of Rana Daggubati's production credits
Year	Title	Role	Language	Notes
2004	Bommalata	Co-producer	Telugu	National Film Award for Best Feature Film in Telugu
2018	C/o Kancharapalem	Presenter	Telugu	
2020	Krishna and His Leela	Presenter	Telugu	
2022	777 Charlie	Presenter	Telugu	Dubbed version
2022	Virata Parvam	Producer	Telugu	
2022	Gargi	Presenter	Telugu	Dubbed version
2023	Pareshan	Presenter	Telugu	
2023	Keedaa Cola	Presenter	Telugu	
2024	35	Presenter	Telugu	
2024	Jigra	Presenter	Telugu	Dubbed version
2025	Kothapallilo Okappudu	Presenter	Telugu	
2025	Kaantha	Co-producer	Tamil	
2025	Premante	Presenter	Telugu	
2026	Neelira	Co-producer	Tamil	
2026	Last Man in Tower	Producer	Hindi	

=== As distributor ===
List of Rana Daggubati's distributor credits
Year	Title	Notes
2024	All We Imagine as Light	Multilingual film; India only
2025	Sabar Bonda	Marathi film; India only

=== As narrator ===
- All works are in Telugu unless otherwise noted.

List of Rana Daggubati's narrator credits
Year	Title	Notes
2017	Winner	
2018	Rajaratham	Telugu version
2018	Subrahmanyapuram	
2022	Ponniyin Selvan: I	Telugu version
2025	Uppu Kappurambu	
2025	3BHK	Telugu version

=== As dubbing artist ===
- All works are in Telugu unless otherwise noted.

List of Rana Daggubati's dubbing credits
Year	Title	Character	Actor	Notes
2016	Inferno	Robert Langdon	Tom Hanks	Telugu version
2018	Avengers: Infinity War	Thanos	Josh Brolin	Telugu version
2019	Avengers: Endgame	Thanos	Josh Brolin	Telugu version
2022	RRR	Scott Buxton	Ray Stevenson	

=== Other crew positions ===
- All works are in Telugu unless otherwise noted.

List of Rana Daggubati's other filmmaking credits
Year	Title	Role	Notes
2002	Nuvvu Leka Nenu Lenu	Clap Boy	
2006	Lakshmi	DI & FX Producer	
2006	Sainikudu	Visual effects coordinator	Nandi Award for Best Special Effects
2006	Thirupathi	Visual effects coordinator	Tamil film
2019	Action	Playback singer	Rapped for "Lights, Camera, Action" (Telugu version)
2021	Love Story	Voice over	Uncredited

== Television ==
List of Rana Daggubati television credits
Year	Title	Role	Network	Language	Notes
2013	2nd South Indian International Movie Awards	Himself (host)	Gemini TV	Telugu	Television special
2015	4th South Indian International Movie Awards	Himself (host)	Gemini TV	Telugu	Television special
2017	2nd IIFA Utsavam	Himself (host)	Gemini TV	Telugu	Television special
2017	Bigg Boss 1	Himself (host)	Star Maa	Telugu	Guest appearance
2017–2021	No. 1 Yaari with Rana	Himself (host)	Viu; Aha	Telugu	
2017	Social	Vikram Sampath	Viu	Telugu; Hindi	Also producer
2021	Mission Frontline with Rana Daggubati	Host	Discovery+	English	
2023–present	Rana Naidu	Rana Naidu	Netflix	Hindi	
2023	Maya Bazaar For Sale	–	ZEE5	Telugu	Producer
2024	Modern Masters: S. S. Rajamouli	Himself	Netflix	English	Documentary film
2024	3rd IIFA Utsavam	Himself (host)	Gemini TV	Telugu	Television special
2024	Nayanthara: Beyond the Fairytale	Himself	Netflix	English	Documentary film
2024–2025	The Rana Daggubati Show	Himself (host)	Amazon Prime Video	Telugu	Also creator and executive producer
2025	Solo Leveling	Barca	Crunchyroll	Hindi; Tamil; Telugu	Dubbed versions
