= Mumbai Police Detection Unit =

Defunct Mumbai Police squad known for targeting organized crime in the 1980s-2000s

The Mumbai Police Detection Unit was a squad within the Mumbai Police which contained several high-profile officers. The squad primarily dealt with members of the Mumbai underworld and other criminal gangs.

The Unit was also colloquially known as the "Encounter Squad" because of its involvement in encounter killings – a euphemistic term for extrajudicial killings committed by police officers.

== Gang wars in Mumbai ==
The Detection Unit initially came into prominence in the 1980s and 1990s, when they started dealing with Dawood Ibrahim's D-Company gang, the Arun Gawli gang, and the Amar Naik gang.

As the prevalence of encounter killings increased, so did the popularity of the "encounter specialist". Officers such as Daya Nayak, Valentine D'Souza, Pradeep Sharma, Ravindranath Angre, Vijay Salaskar, Sachin Vaze and Sanjay Kadam became cult figures, mythologised by the media.

The first encounter occurred on 11 January 1982, when gangster Manya Surve was shot dead by police officers Raja Tambat and Isaque Bagwan at the Wadala area. The famous killing of Maya Dolas in the 1991 Lokhandwala Complex shootout brought attention to the squad for first time. The squad would go on to kill more than 400 criminals from different gangs.

Since the cracking of the 1993 Mumbai Bomb blasts case, the squad played an instrumental role in controlling the gangs of Dawood Ibrahim, Chota Rajan, Ashwin Naik, Ravi Pujari, Ejaz Lakdawala, Ali Budesh, and Arun Gawli gangs in Mumbai.

The squad was dissolved after rival dons Dawood and Chota Rajan fled India, but revived after the 11 July 2006 Mumbai train bombings. Then after 2006 some mysterious hit groups led by an unknown youth from South India ruled with local, national as well as international support continued until the end of 2009. Then they just vanished even as per the police records.

The end of the squad came with the departure of Vaze and Nayak from service, and death of Vijay Salaskar. While Vaze was later dismissed for his involvement in the Antilia bomb scare in February 2021, and Nayak was transferred after reinstatement in 2012, Salaskar was killed in a gun battle at Rangbhavan Lane during the November 2008 terror attack in Mumbai.

== Portrayals in popular culture ==
- Ab Tak Chhappan – Nana Patekar playing role of Sadhu Agashe based on Daya Nayak
- Company – Vivek Oberoi playing Chhota Rajan, Mohanlal playing Encounter Squad Chief
- Shootout at Wadala – John Abraham playing Manya Surve, movie on Manya's Encounter,
- Shootout at Lokhandwala – Vivek Oberoi playing Maya Dolas, film based on Maya's Encounter,
- Aan: Men at Work – Character based on real-life inspectors
- Sarfarosh – Fictional story based upon the Indian underworld.
- Encounter: The Killing – It stars Naseeruddin Shah, Dilip Prabhavalkar and Tara Deshpande in pivotal roles.
- Garv – Brothers Salman and Arbaaz Khan play roles of ACPs of Encounter squad
- Golimaar – Gangaram (Gopichand) is an orphan who dreams of becoming a police officer from childhood
- Department – At least one further film is planned.
- Rege – A Marathi film featuring two characters inspired and named after Pradeep Sharma and Sachin Vaze.
