= Daya Nayak =

Indian police officer

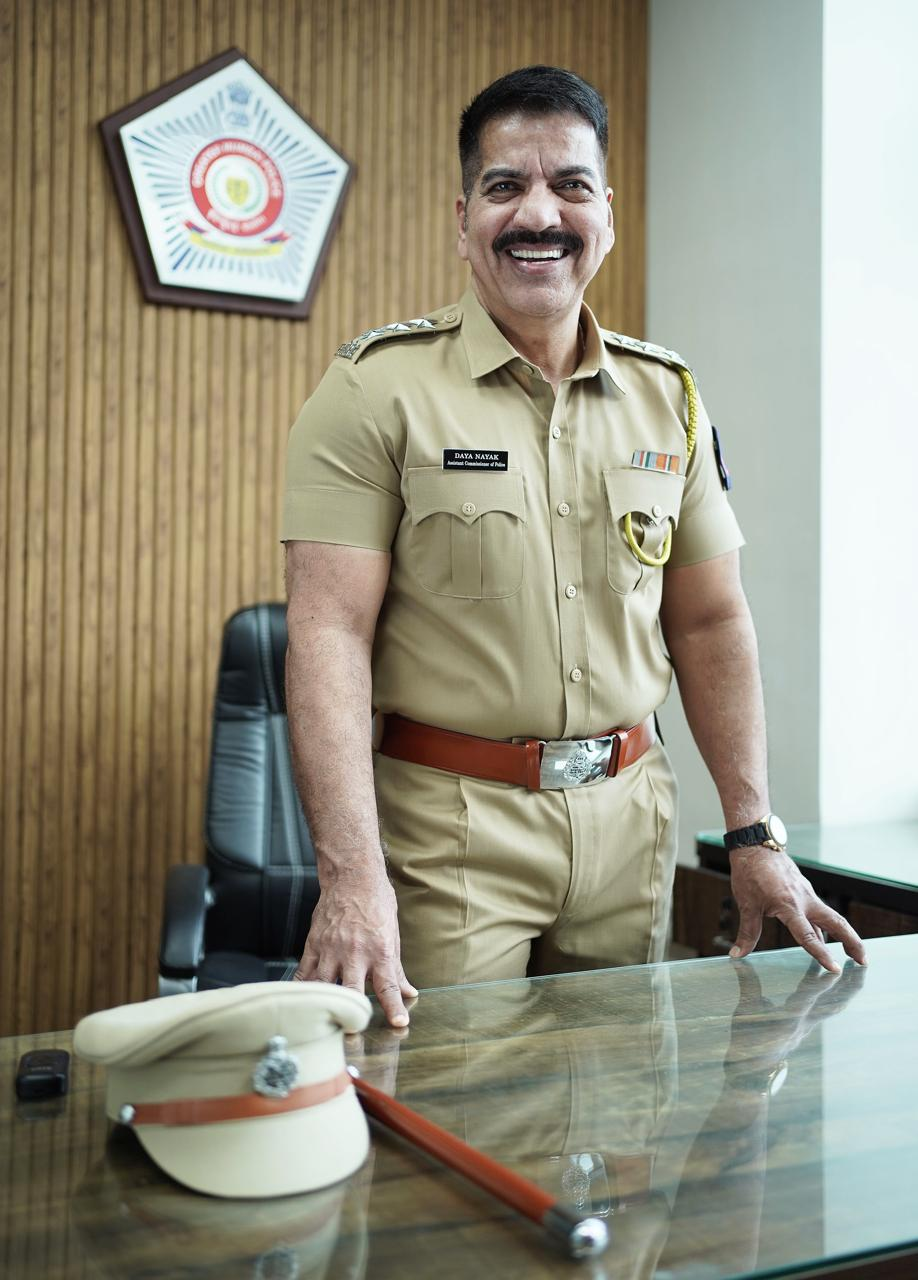
- Spouse: Komal N.
- Police career
- Country: Maharashtra, India
- Department: Greater Mumbai Police
- Branch: Mumbai Police Detection Unit
- Rank: Assistant commissioner of police (ACP)

Daya Nayak is an Indian police officer who served with the Mumbai Police for over three decades. Joining the force as a Sub-Inspector in 1995, he became one of the most widely recognised officers associated with Mumbai’s campaign against organised crime during the 1990s and early 2000s. Throughout his career, he served in several operational and investigative assignments and was known for his role in combating organised criminal syndicates. Although frequently described by the media as an “encounter specialist”, Nayak has consistently rejected the designation. In several public interviews, he has maintained that he merely discharged the duties entrusted to him under the law and acted in accordance with directions issued by his superiors. He has stated that his role was that of a government functionary carrying out the State’s efforts to dismantle organised crime and restore public order. Following a prolonged legal battle relating to allegations of disproportionate assets, Nayak was exonerated and reinstated into service. His continuity of service, seniority, rank and all consequential service benefits were restored. He was promoted to the rank of Assistant Commissioner of Police shortly before retiring on 31 July 2025 after completing thirty one years of service.

== Early life ==
Daya Nayak was born in Yennehole village in Karkala Taluk of Udupi district, Karnataka, into a Konkani-speaking family. He completed his schooling up to the seventh standard in a Kannada-medium school established by his grandfather.. He was an encounter specialist. In 1979, he moved to Mumbai after his father encouraged him to contribute to the family’s financial needs. He worked in a hotel canteen while continuing his education, often sleeping on the hotel’s porch during this period. Through perseverance, he completed his higher education and graduated from CES College in D. N. Nagar, Mumbai. Before joining the police service, he worked as a plumbing supervisor.

== Police career ==
Nayak joined the Mumbai Police as a trainee Sub-Inspector in 1995. After completing his training, he was posted to Juhu Police Station before being assigned to the Detection Unit of the Crime Branch during a period marked by escalating gang violence and organised crime in Mumbai. He participated in numerous operations against organised criminal syndicates and became one of the most recognised police officers of his generation. While the media often referred to him as an “encounter specialist”, Nayak has repeatedly stated that he neither sought nor accepted that label. According to him, every operation was undertaken as part of official policing responsibilities and in accordance with lawful instructions issued by the competent authorities. He has consistently maintained that the objective of these operations was the protection of citizens and the dismantling of organised criminal networks, rather than the cultivation of an individual reputation.

In 1997, Nayak sustained gunshot injuries during an operation against gangsters and was hospitalised. He later remarked that the use of lethal force was never an objective in itself but, on certain occasions, became unavoidable in preventing greater loss of life. Over the course of his career, Nayak served in several specialised units of the Mumbai Police and remained actively involved in crime detection and law enforcement.

== School in Yennehole ==
Daya Nayak built a school in his native village Yennehole. The money for building the school was collected through donations from Bollywood personalities in name of the Radha Nayak Educational Trust (named after Nayak's mother). The school was inaugurated by Amitabh Bachchan in 2000 in presence of celebrities like M. F. Husain, Suniel Shetty and Aftab Shivdasani. It was later handed over to the Government of Karnataka, and is now known as the Radha Nayak Government High School.

== Community service ==
In memory of his mother, Radha Nayak, he established the Radha Nayak Educational Trust, which raised funds for the construction of a high school in his native village of Yennehole through contributions from members of the Indian film industry and other donors.

The school was inaugurated in 2000 by Amitabh Bachchan in the presence of M. F. Husain, Suniel Shetty, Aftab Shivdasani and other distinguished guests. It was subsequently handed over to the Government of Karnataka and today functions as the Radha Nayak Government High School.

== Investigations and legal proceedings ==
Beginning in 2005 , Nayak became the subject of allegations concerning disproportionate assets and alleged links with members of the Mumbai underworld. He also contended that several factual inaccuracies had formed the basis of the investigation.

The ACB stated that he had amassed wealth worth crores of rupees. The ACB found his assets to be worth far less – Rs. 6,61,000 , but still filed a chargesheet against him, stating that these assets were disproportionate to Nayak's monthly salary of ₹10,000 as a sub-inspector.[7] Nayak was accused of floating bogus companies with help of his associate Rajendra Padte, and getting his wife Komal to take out property loans.

The ACB summoned them 27 times, but could not find any evidence. He was arrested at the insistence of IPS officer Pradnya Saravade. He was in custody for 58 days. A special space in Bhoiwada was created just for him as per a never before court order.

After 5 years of continuous investigation, The Anti Corruption Beureau then reported to the court that they could not find any evidence and therefore were not in a position to file a chargesheet and therefore requested the court to please close the case against Daya Nayak.

== Exoneration and return to service ==
Following judicial proceedings and departmental review, Nayak was exonerated of the allegations made against him. The proceedings concluded in his favour, following which he was reinstated into the Mumbai Police on 16 June 2012. He was initially posted to the Local Arms Unit and subsequently served in other assignments within the Mumbai Police. Following administrative transfers and reinstatement, he continued in active service until his retirement. Consequent upon his exoneration, his continuity of service was restored. His service record, seniority, promotions, rank, salary, pensionary benefits and all consequential service entitlements were regularised and restored in accordance with the orders of the competent authorities

== Promotion, retirement and consultancy ==
Nayak was promoted to the rank of Senior Inspector in January 2024.

On 29 July 2025, he was promoted to the rank of Assistant Commissioner of Police (ACP). He retired from the Mumbai Police on 31 July 2025 after completing 30 years of service. Following his retirement, he has continued to contribute his operational experience and expertise in support of policing initiatives.

== Legacy ==
Daya Nayak’s policing career spans more than three decades and coincided with one of the most significant periods in Mumbai’s campaign against organised crime. His career has attracted widespread public attention for both his operational policing and the legal proceedings that followed. His reinstatement, restoration of all service benefits and retirement with the rank of Assistant Commissioner of Police following his exoneration marked the culmination of a distinguished career in public service. Alongside his policing career, his contribution to education through the establishment of the Radha Nayak Government High School remains a lasting legacy in his native village.

== In popular culture ==
The Hindi films Ab Tak Chhappan by Shimit Amin and N Chandra's Kagaar are based on Nayak's personal experiences, as is the Kannada film Encounter Daya Nayak. Ab Tak Chhappan was later remade into Telugu as Siddham. The 2007 film Risk by Vishram Sawant has overtones from Daya Nayak's life. - A Telugu film, titled Golimaar released in 2010 is also inspired by his life. The 2012 Bollywood film Department highlights the encounter specialists of the Mumbai Police; Daya Nayak's role is played by Rana Daggubatti . A sequel to Ab Tak Chhappan was released in February 2015 titled Ab Tak Chhappan 2.

Another Telugu film titled Temper, was released in 2015 and the protagonist's name was also titled after him.

== See also ==
- D-Company
