= Shaka Laka Boom Boom =

Indian Television Series

- Genre: Fantasy; Adventure; Comedy
- Written by: Vijay Krishna Acharya
- Directed by: Vijay Krishna Acharya
- Starring: Kinshuk Vaidya; Hansika Motwani; Madhur Mittal; Shehzad Khan
- Opening theme: "Shaka Laka Boom Boom" by KK
- Country of origin: India
- No. of seasons: 4
- No. of episodes: 491

Production
- Editor: Manish Mistry
- Running time: 24 minutes
- Production companies: UTV Software Communications (2000–2004); Rose Audio Visuals (2003)

Original release
- Network: DD National
- Release: 15 October 2000 – 6 May 2001
- Network: StarPlus
- Release: 19 August 2002 – 10 October 2004

Shaka Laka Boom Boom is an Indian children's fantasy adventure television series. It was written and directed by Vijay Krishna Acharya. Merchandise based on the series were also launched in markets.

== Plot ==
Sanju is an ordinary, courageous and compassionate boy. One day, he discovers a magical pencil imbued with the power to bring to life the sketches it creates.

As Sanju begins to grasp the abilities of the magical pencil, he inadvertently draws the attention of a gang of thieves, led by a criminal named Tiger. Assisting Tiger is a magician named Kalicharan who wants the pencil for its limitless potential.

Throughout the first season, Sanju uses the enchanted pencil to help his friends while Tiger and his followers continue their pursuit of it, sometimes almost succeeding, only to be foiled by Sanju's quick thinking. Later, Sanju sacrifices the magical pencil to save the world.

The second season centres on an alien, Shaan, and his adventures with the magical pencil. The third season focuses on Sanju and Shaan attending a magic school called Jadoo High. In the fourth season, Sanju travels to the year 2022 to protect his future family.

== Cast ==
- Vishal Solanki as Sanju (2000–2001)
  - Kinshuk Vaidya as Sanju (2002–2004)
- Rahul Joshi as Shaan/Neeraj's sidekick
- Kalyani Nerurkar as Zoya/Nito
- Hansika Motwani as Karuna/Shona
- Frank Anthony as Chandu
- Sainee Raj as Ritu
- Reema Vohra as Sanjana
- Adnan Jp as Mr. Jagoo
- Madhur Mittal as Tito
- Nikhil Yadav as Partho / Poisdon
- Mamik Singh / Rushad Rana as Adult Sanju / Sandros
- Tanvi Hegde as Fruity
- Tushar Dalvi as Raj: Sanju's father (2000–2001)
- Sudha Chandran as Sanju's mother (2000–2001)
- Lata Sabharwal as Sanju's Mother
- Ashiesh Roy as Partho's father
- Aditya Kapadia as Jhumru
- Pallavi Rao as Karuna Maami
- Vaishali Thakkar as Lalita
- Amrapali Gupta as Kitty (2003–2004)
- Romit Raaj as Karan (2003)
- Jennifer Winget as Piya (2003)
- Chahatt Khanna as Simple (Ex) / Jay Rani
- Tanmay Jahagirdar as Sunny
- Ishita Sharma as Simple
- Ronak Kotecha as Silly Point
- Mehul as Short Leg
- KK Goswami as Crystal
- Shehzad Khan as Tiger
- Sachin Singh as Monu
- Jagesh Mukati as Mangu
- Kurush Deboo as Colonel K.K. aka K.K. Uncle
- Bharati Achrekar as School Principal
- Jarrar Choudhry as Inspector Abhinav
- Ankit Shah as Sanju's cousin Sumit
- Manish Wadhwa as Ajit Bhalla
- Lalit Parimoo as Acharya Odin, Principal of Jadoo High

== Broadcasting ==
The first season aired on DD National on 15 October 2000, and the show was later moved to Star Plus for subsequent seasons. The Star Plus run began on 19 August 2002 and cast Kinshuk Vaidya as Sanju. The series was rerun several times on Star Utsav, Disney Channel India, STAR One, Disney XD and Hungama TV. The show was dubbed into Tamil for Vijay TV.
