= Siddham (film) =

- DVD Cover
- Directed by: J. D. Chakravarthy
- Written by: J. D. Chakravarthy (screenplay / dialogues)
- Story by: Ram Gopal Varma
- Based on: Ab Tak Chhappan (2004)
- Produced by: Kiran Kumar Koneru
- Starring: Jagapati Babu; Sindhu Menon
- Cinematography: Bharani K. Dharan
- Edited by: Bhanodaya
- Music by: Amar Mohile
- Production company: Shreya Productions
- Release date: 12 February 2009
- Running time: 134 minutes
- Country: India
- Language: Telugu

Siddham (transl. Ready) is a 2009 Telugu-language action film, produced by Kiran Kumar Koneru on Shreya Productions banner and directed by J. D. Chakravarthy. The film stars Jagapati Babu and Sindhu Menon, with music composed by Amar Mohile. This film's plot is inspired by the Hindi film, Ab Tak Chhappan.

== Plot ==
The film begins at the Hyderabad Task Force department led by a dynamic deputy, Dayanayak, an encounter specialist. Though challenging, he has an enjoyable way of living with his ideal wife, Gauri, and daughter Harini. Daya holds the best network over the underworld and is cordial with his juniors & informers. However, Daya's pre-eminence envies one of his boys, Salim. Parallelly, a drastic feud rundown between mobsters Bilal, based abroad, and Chota. Meanwhile, a new kid, Akhil, on the block, attains confidence in Daya, and nice amity develops between them. During these events, Daya establishes a love-hate telephonic conversation with Bilal. Sooner, Daya upends when his confidential adviser, Commissioner Gurunarayana, retires, and an amoral Sivalinga Prasad arrives. He aids Chota, also persecutes Daya, and hoists Salim. Nevertheless, Daya strenuously never fails his path.

Once Daya gets intel regarding the landing of professional sharpshooter Ashok Chota's sidekick, he immediately takes action and apprehends him. But alas, his mother dies in that encounter where Ashok seeks vengeance and breaks out of the prison. At that point, Bilal notifies Daya that he is at risk from Ashok. Then, on the eve of Akhil's wedding, Gauri is slain by an unidentified and the cataclysmic forms severe impact on Daya. Yet, he is committed and initiates an inquiry, which Sivalinga Prasad hinders. Thus, Daya resigns and wipes out Chota's gang. Forthwith, Sivalinga Prasad announces shoot-at-sight orders against Daya and assigns Salim, who traps him. On the verge of his encounter, Akhil fires on Salim and frees Daya. Afterward, Daya knocks out Sivalinga Prasad too.

Now, Daya calls for Bilal to fuse, which he accepts and succeeds in getting him out of India. Later that night, Daya & Bilal begin a dialogue when Bilal states Ashok is the homicide of Gauri. Here, shockingly, Daya proclaims that he had already encountered Ashok before Gauri's death. Notoriously, it is Bilal's foul play that killed Gauri on behalf of Ashok, inducing Daya against Chota's gang. Anyhow, Daya has made this reverse gimmick for it. He slaughters Bilal therein and returns. At last, Gurunarayana reinstates Daya by posing his crimes as a covert mission. Finally, the movie ends with Daya persistently proceeding to a new operation with his team.

== Cast ==
- Jagapathi Babu as Dayanand alias Daya (based on Daya Nayak)
- Sindhu Menon as Gauri
- Kota Srinivasa Rao as Commissioner Gurunarayan
- Radha Ravi as Commissioner Sivalinga Prasad
- Mukul Dev as Bilal
- Kota Venkata Anjaneya Prasad as Saleem
- Dr.Bharath Reddy as Akhil
- Subbaraju as Ashok
- Narsing Yadav as Fancis
- Amith as Pappu
- Bharat as Vasim
- Govardhan as Narayana
- Dr. Siva Prasad as MLA Sudheer Babu
- Sandra as Padma
- Aparna as Pinky
- Baby Sivani as Harini
