= Ab Tak Chhappan 2 =

2015 film

- Theatrical release poster
- Directed by: Aejaz Gulab
- Written by: Nilesh Girkar
- Produced by: Raju Chada; Gopal Dalvi
- Starring: Nana Patekar; Ashutosh Rana; Vikram Gokhale; Gul Panag
- Cinematography: Siddharth More
- Edited by: Vinay Chauhan; Abhijith Kokate
- Music by: Sandeep Chowta
- Production company: Alumbra Entertainment
- Distributed by: Wave Cinemas Ponty Chadha
- Release date: 27 February 2015
- Running time: 105 minutes
- Country: India
- Language: Hindi
- Box office: est. ₹6.64 crore

Ab Tak Chhappan 2 (transl. Fifty-six so far Part 2) is a 2015 Indian Hindi-language action thriller film produced by Raju Chada and Gopal Dalvi. The film is directed by Aejaz Gulab and scripted by Nilesh Girkar. The film stars Nana Patekar in the lead role. It also stars Gul Panag, and Ashutosh Rana. The film is a sequel to the crime drama Ab Tak Chhappan. The film was released on 27 February 2015 and met with mixed to positive reviews. The story revolves around Inspector Sadhu Agashe (Nana Patekar) from the Mumbai Encounter Squad. It is inspired by the life of Police sub-Inspector with Mumbai Police force Daya Nayak.

== Plot ==
Ab Tak Chhappan 2 opens to encounter specialist Sadhu Agashe (Nana Patekar) proclaiming what he did was right. The film then goes into flashback, where we are shown what happened a few months back. Away from Mumbai, with a few cases pending against him, Sadhu now leads a peaceful life in his village (Goa) with his son Aman, mourning the loss of his wife. He cooks, lives in a house by the river and listens to his son playing the piano. However, his retired phase comes to a halt, when the ex-police commissioner (Mohan Agashe) convinces Sadhu to get back on the job on the home minister's (Vikram Gokhale) request to tackle Mumbai's escalating crime scene.

Sadhu is hesitant, but his son talks him into accepting the offer, which brings him back to Mumbai. While Sadhu's encounter squad is happy to see him, Thorat (Ashutosh Rana), Sadhu's junior is not too pleased with the decision as he hopes to become the chief. Sadhu senses the rivalry and makes it clear to Thorat that he will have to follow orders.

The squad begins their mission by reconnecting with their sources and targeting lower-level gangsters of two gangs (Rauf's and Rawale's gangs). Meanwhile, crime reporter Shalu Dixit (Gul Panag) becomes a regular visitor at Sadhu's residence, since she wants to finish the book on 'encounter cops', which her journalist father wasn't able to complete before he was shot by a gangster.

As the encounter squad goes on a shooting spree, Sadhu starts getting threats from unknown parties. Soon, Sadhu's son is targeted by the gangsters and is shot while walking on the beach. Rawale informs Sadhu that Rauf has done it. Sadhu nabs Rauf. He initially denies being the culprit but later accepts it. However, he also warns Sadhu that Rawale has been assigned the job of killing the righteous CM (Dilip Prabhawalkar) by someone, whom Sadhu trusts a lot. Before Rauf could give away the name, he gets shot by Thorat. The latter says he was ordered to do so. It is soon announced that Rawale would be returning to Mumbai and may join politics soon. Both Sadhu and Shalu suspects that the home minister is involved in the CM's assassination and was the one who took Rawale's help to plot the murder.

Sadhu confronts the home minister, and the latter admits it, saying his political career wouldn't have taken off in the presence of the CM, who didn't favour him and his devious activities. He also dares Sadhu to expose him, having a firm opinion that no one would believe Sadhu.

Sadhu decides to give up, but Shalu tells him that she has found evidence against the home minister, a video proof of his meeting with Rawale, but before she could pick up the CD, she gets shot by Thorat, who is now revealed to be the home minister's henchman. Sadhu arrives at the nick of time and shoots Thorat dead before he can kill Shalu.

Sadhu goes to an event, where the home minister is to pay tribute to the late CM. Sadhu steps on stage, requests he be given an opportunity to speak. After appreciating the Home Minister, he quickly moves towards him and stabs a sharp pen into his shoulder, thus killing him.

The film continues at the present time, where Commissioner Pradhan is shown interrogating Sadhu. As he leaves the room, Sadhu asks Pradhan to take care of Aman, and it is implied that Aman is still alive. His death was merely faked to eliminate the underworld. An epilogue is shown where we are told that Sadhu was given life imprisonment for also killing Rawale in the same jail where both were imprisoned together.

== Cast ==
- Nana Patekar as Inspector Sadhu Agashe (based on Daya Nayak)
- Gul Panag as Crime Reporter Shalu Dixit
- Tanmay Jahagirdar as Aman, Sadhu Agashe's son
- Dr Mohan Agashe as an Ex Commissioner Pradhan
- Govind Namdev as Police Commissioner Bhandare
- Raj Zutshi as Rawle, New don after Zameer (Antagonist from the previous film).
- Vikram Gokhale as Home Minister Janardhan Jagirdar
- Dilip Prabhavalkar as Chief Minister Anna Saheb
- Ashutosh Rana as Suryakant Thorat, Sadhu's Immediate Junior
- Revathi as Mrs Sadhu Agashe (in footage from the previous film)
- Pradeep Kabra as Postman
- Jehangir Khan as Rauf Khan, underworld don
- Yatin Kadam as Sub Inspector Jagdale
- Aniruddha Harip as Sub Inspector Ghorpade
- Jagat Rawat as Keshav, PA to Home Minister
- Madan Tyagi as Qazi
- Umesh as Rauf's father
- Karuna Verma as Rauf's wife
- Daljit Sandhu as Rauf's sister
- Hrishikesh Joshi as Jyoti
- Bobby Bedi as Mushtaq
