= Kovelamudi =

Kovelamudi or Kovelamoodi (Telugu: కోవెలమూడి) is a toponymic Telugu surname denoting ancestry from the village of the same name in Guntur district, Andhra Pradesh, India. Notable people with the surname include:

- [Rao Bahdur Kovelamudi gapalakrishnayya garu], his youngest son *[Kovelamudi Bhaskar Rao garu] Bhaskar films.
- A Brief History Of the Kammas, p. 96: https://archive.org/details/brief-history-of-the-kammas/page/96/mode/2up History of Bezwada Bar, pp 23–24: https://archive.org/details/history-of-bezwada-bar-1975-d.-v.-sivarao/page/23/mode/2up Sivaram Prasad, Rewind and Replay, p. 11
- Kovelamudi Surya Prakash Rao, a versatile Indian actor, cinematographer, director and producer.
- Kovelamudi Raghavendra Rao, a veteran Indian film director.
- Prakash Kovelamudi, an Indian film director.
- Kovelamudi Bapayya, an Indian film director
