= Rana Daggubati =

Indian actor (born 1984)

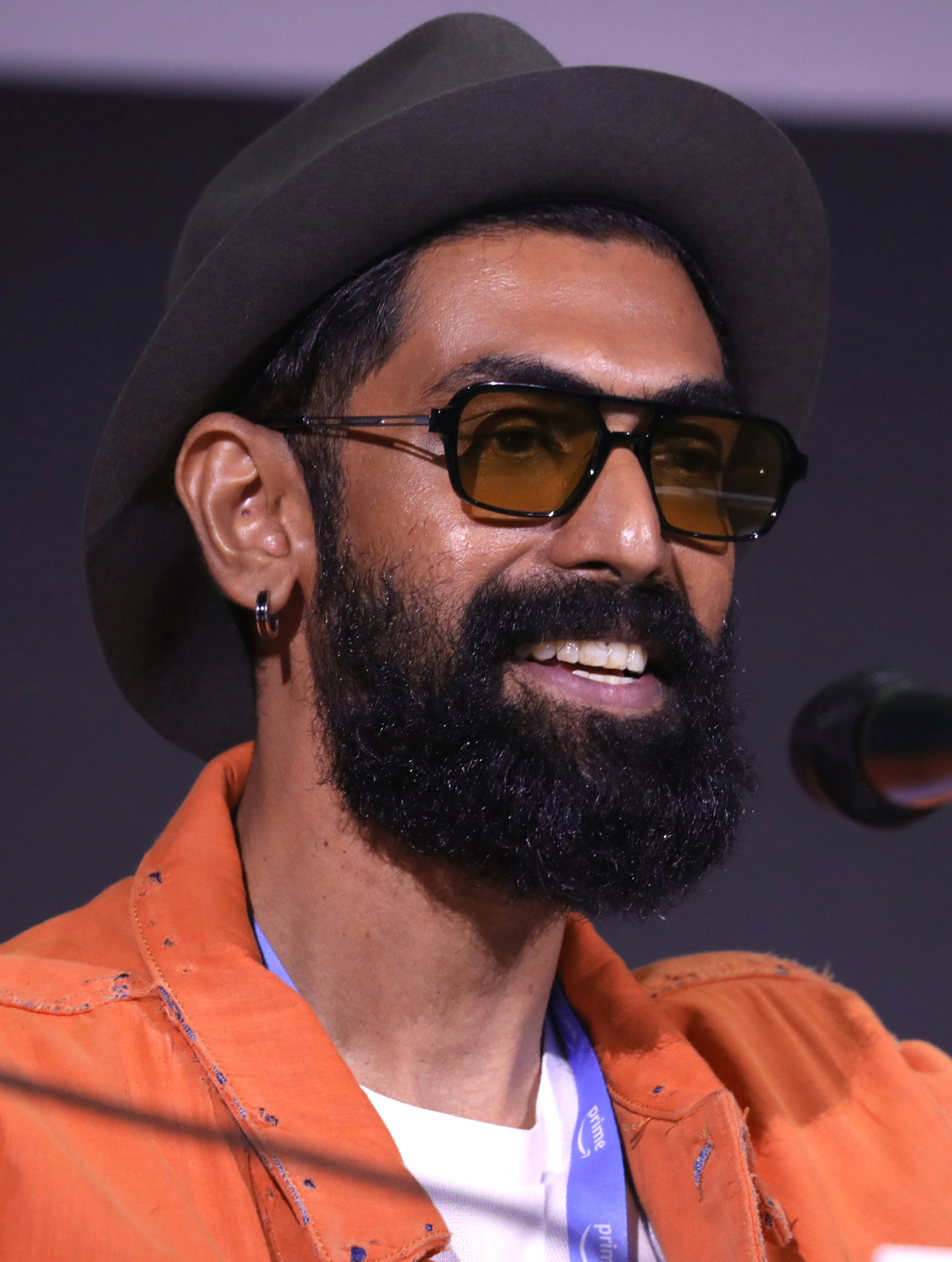
- Daggubati at San Diego Comic-Con in 2023
- Born: Ramanaidu Daggubati; 14 December 1984 (age 41); Madras (now Chennai), Tamil Nadu, India
- Occupations: Actor; film producer; entrepreneur
- Years active: 2005–present
- Organization(s): Suresh Productions; Amar Chitra Katha
- Works: Full list
- Spouse: Miheeka Bajaj (m. 2020)
- Father: D. Suresh Babu
- Relatives: D. Ramanaidu (grandfather); Daggubati Venkatesh (paternal uncle); Naga Chaitanya (cousin); Nagarjuna Akkineni (maternal uncle)
- Family: Akkineni–Daggubati family

Ramanaidu "Rana" Daggubati (pronounced [ˈɾaː.ɳaː.daɡgu.baː.ʈi]; born 14 December 1984) is an Indian actor, film producer, and entrepreneur who primarily works in Telugu cinema, in addition to Tamil and Hindi films. He is a recipient of several accolades including a National Film Award, two Nandi Award, six SIIMA Awards and three Filmfare Awards South.

Son of film producer D. Suresh Babu, he made his acting debut with Leader (2010), for which he won the Filmfare Award for Best Male Debut. He later starred in the Hindi film Dum Maaro Dum (2011), alongside Bipasha Basu, where he received positive reviews for his performance and won the Zee Cine Award for Best Male Debut. In 2012, Rana gained prominence by starring in the hit Telugu film Krishnam Vande Jagadgurum. In 2015, he played a notable supporting role in the successful Hindi film Baby (2015). He later starred as Bhallaladeva, the main antagonist in the Telugu-Tamil bilingual film Baahubali: The Beginning (2015), which recorded the second highest gross opening for an Indian film. In 2017, Rana later reprised his role as Bhallaladeva in Baahubali 2: The Conclusion, which became the highest grossing South Indian film of all time. He has also simultaneously starred in successful films such as Rudramadevi (2015), Ghazi (2017), and Nene Raju Nene Mantri (2017).

As a visual effects producer, Rana won the State Nandi Award for Best Special Effects in 2006 for the Telugu film Sainikudu. In 2006, he received the National Film Award for co-producing Bommalata. Rana is also an established television personality, hosting award shows such as the 2nd IIFA Utsavam, the South Indian International Movie Awards. He also hosted talk shows No. 1 Yaari with Rana (2017–2021) and The Rana Daggubati Show. Alongside building a career in cinema, Rana is invested in businesses ranging from a business accelerator programme for technology startups, to an entertainment agency and a comic book company.

Daggubati became the board member of Mumbai Academy of the Moving Image. Rana is described as one of the few actors in India who were able to achieve pan-Indian appeal, having taken up a variety of roles, from leading roles to supporting characters, in different languages.

== Early life and family ==
Ramanaidu Daggubati was born on 14 December 1984 in a Telugu family to film producer D. Suresh Babu in Madras (present-day Chennai), Tamil Nadu. He was named after his paternal grandfather and movie mogul D. Ramanaidu. A member of the Daggubati–Akkineni family, his paternal uncle Venkatesh, maternal uncle Nagarjuna and his son (Daggubati's cousin) Naga Chaitanya are also actors. Rana revealed in 2016 that he is blind in his right eye, and his left eye is a transplanted one. The surgery was done in L. V. Prasad Hospital, Hyderabad. Another surgery was done on his right eye when he was 14, but was unsuccessful.

Rana did his early schooling in Chennai at Chettinad Vidyashram. He later shifted to Hyderabad, Telangana, where he studied at Nalanda Vidya Bhavan High School and The Hyderabad Public School, Begumpet. At Hyderabad Public School, he was classmates with Ram Charan, Sharwanand, Nikhil Siddharth, and Nag Ashwin. His enrolled for his collegiate studies at St. Mary's College, Hyderabad but eventually dropped out. He lives with his family in Film Nagar Hyderabad. He also owns a flat in Mumbai.

== Acting career ==
=== 2010–2012: Debut ===
Rana's debut film as an actor in Telugu was Leader (2010), directed by Shekhar Kammula. It remains one of his highest grossers. In it, he plays the role of an aspiring Chief minister of Andhra Pradesh. It opened to rave reviews from critics with his performance got much praise. A critic from The Times of India stated that "Another lineage star Rana takes his first bow at the BO with an inspiring political saga, a far cry from the formula-ridden films that his ilk usually begin with including his uncle and star Venkatesh." His performance in the film fetched him two awards – Filmfare Award for Best Male Debut – South and CineMAA Award for Best Male Debut. Rana made his Hindi debut with the film Dum Maaro Dum, alongside Bipasha Basu, Abhishek Bachchan and Prateik Babbar which released on 22 April 2011. where he received positive reviews for his performance and won the Zee Cine Award for Best Male Debut.The Times of India called it a "dashing debut". Taran Adarsh commented that "Much of the joy comes from watching Rana Daggubati infuse believability into his character. He's easy on the eyes and is a complete natural when it comes to acting." He won the Zee Cine Award for Best Male Debut for his performance in the film.

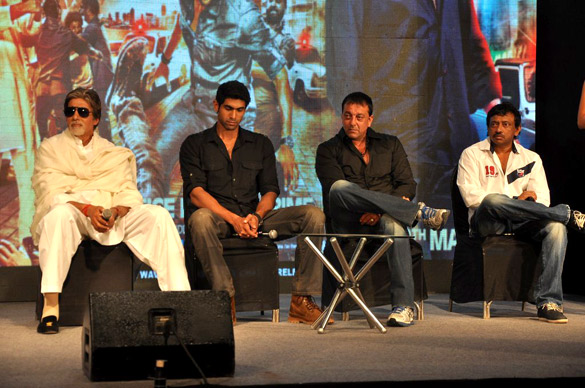
Daggubati at a promotional event for Department in 2012, along with Amitabh Bachchan, Sanjay Dutt and Ram Gopal Varma

In his next Telugu film, Nenu Naa Rakshasi (2011), he played a professional killer Abhimanyu alongside Ileana D'Cruz, under Puri Jagannadh's direction It was a box-office bomb. A reviewer of NDTV wrote that "Rana's attempt to prove himself as a commercial hero has not taken off and he should wait for another break."

Rana had three releases in 2012. His first release of the year was the romantic action film Naa Ishtam. News 18 credited it as Rana's first "full-length commercial film." Radhika Rajamani of Rediff.com, in her review of the film, praised Rana' performance but criticised the screenplay. His next film was Department, directed by Ram Gopal Varma, alongside Amitabh Bachchan and Sanjay Dutt. The film received mixed response from critics and was declared as a box-office bomb. His last release of the year was Krishnam Vande Jagadgurum, directed by Krish, which became a box office success, also receiving critical acclaim. he plays the role of a theatre artist who later meets Devika (Nayanthara). an informer of the CBI, and takes revenge on Redappa/Chakravarthy (Murali Sharma/Milind Gunaji). A critic noted his performance as "brilliant" and "commendable". Karthik Pasupulate of The Times of India felt that, his performance in the film is his best one to date and is a few notches above everything else he's done to date. In July 2012, Rana signed do a "special appearance" in the film Arrambam, which his Tamil cinema debut.

=== 2013–2017: Breakthrough ===
The year 2013 was one of the busiest in his career. Rana made cameo appearances in three films – Sundar C's Something Something, Ayan Mukerji's Yeh Jawaani Hai Deewani and Vishnuvardhan's Arrambam, with the latter being his Tamil debut. The same year, he joined two big-budget productions, Gunasekhar's Rudhramadevi and S. S. Rajamouli's Baahubali: The Beginning, the latter of in which he is the lead antagonist. Both the films were released in 2015. Rana did not have a single release in 2014.

In 2015, he starred in the Hindi film Baby, alongside Akshay Kumar and Taapsee Pannu. Rana played Bhallaladeva, the cousin of Baahubali (Prabhas), in the 2015 film Baahubali: The Beginning, which is part of Baahubali franchise. His character became widely popular and received unprecedented appreciation from critics. Rana was inspired by Daniel Day-Lewis to play the character. He described the film as "career-defining" for him. Baahubali: The Beginning was released worldwide in July 2015 and was the highest-grossing film in India at the time of its release. Made on a production budget of ₹ 180 crore, the film collected a worldwide gross of ₹650 crore at the box office. The film gave him several awards, including the Nandi Award for Best Villain and SIIMA Award for Best Actor in a Negative Role (Telugu). The film started a new film movement named Pan-India films. He next appeared in the film Rudhramadevi. It is a 3D biographical action film based on the life of Rudrama Devi, in which he played the role of Chalukya Veerabhadra. Although, the film did not performed well at the box-office, it received mixed reviews from the critics. Pranita Jonnalagedda felt that his character in the film is "underused". The same year, he appeared as himself in a cameo role in Dongaata (Telugu), Size Zero (Telugu) and Inji Iduppazhagi (Tamil).

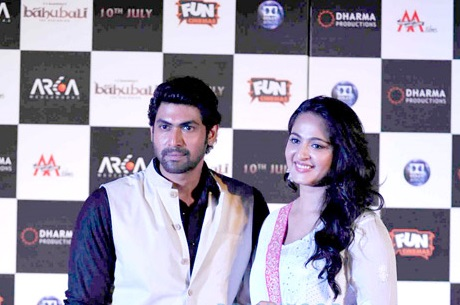
Daggubati, along with Anushka Shetty, at the trailer launch of Baahubali: The Beginning

The following year, he was a part of the Tamil film Bangalore Naatkal, In 2017, he starred in India's first submarine based Telugu-Hindi bilingual film, Ghazi. The film's plot is based on the mysterious sinking of PNS Ghazi during the Indo-Pakistani War of 1971, in which he played Lieutenant Commander Arjun Varma. He shot for 18 days in a specially constructed underwater set. Hindustan Times's Gautaman Bhaskaran wrote that "Daggubati is wonderfully restrained – a complete changeover from the kind of parts he has been playing so far". Several other critics also praised his performance in the film.

Rana reprised his role in the second part of the film series of Baahubali franchise, Baahubali 2: The Conclusion. The film started the 1000 Crore Club in Indian cinema. It is currently the second highest-grossing Indian film and the 39th highest-grossing film of 2017 with a gross of ₹1,810 crore. He spent a total of 250 days shooting both the films of the series over five years. His performance as Bhallaladeva was well praised, with critics calling it "terrific", "scheming villain". A critic of News18 stated that he has "made an indelible impact on the viewers." He won two major awards, Filmfare Award for Best Supporting Actor – Telugu and SIIMA Award for Best Actor in a Negative Role (Telugu). He next did a Telugu film Nene Raju Nene Mantri in which he plays a politician with grey shades, alongside Kajal Aggarwal. In an interview to Gulf News, director Teja said that "I wanted Joginder to dress like M. G. Ramachandran and have included some traits of MGR in Joginder's life". This film received some mixed reviews but Rana's acting and screen presence were praised. Hemanth Kumar, writing for Firstpost, called his performance "terrific" and added that "it is a performance that we won't forget anytime soon."

Rana next began shooting for the Telugu-Tamil bilingual film 1945. However, in September 2019, he called it an "unfinished film," while also adding that: "producer defaulted on money." He also signed the mythological film Hiranyakashyapa directed by Gunasekhar, in 2017. Estimated to be made on a production budget of ₹180 crore, the film features Rana in the titular role of Hiranyakashipu. Although as of October 2020, the film stood temporarily shelved owing to the COVID-19 pandemic. He announced his next film Kaadan (in Tamil; Aranya in Telugu; Haathi Mere Saathi in Hindi) on 14 December 2017, directed by Prabhu Solomon.

=== 2018–present: Experimental roles ===
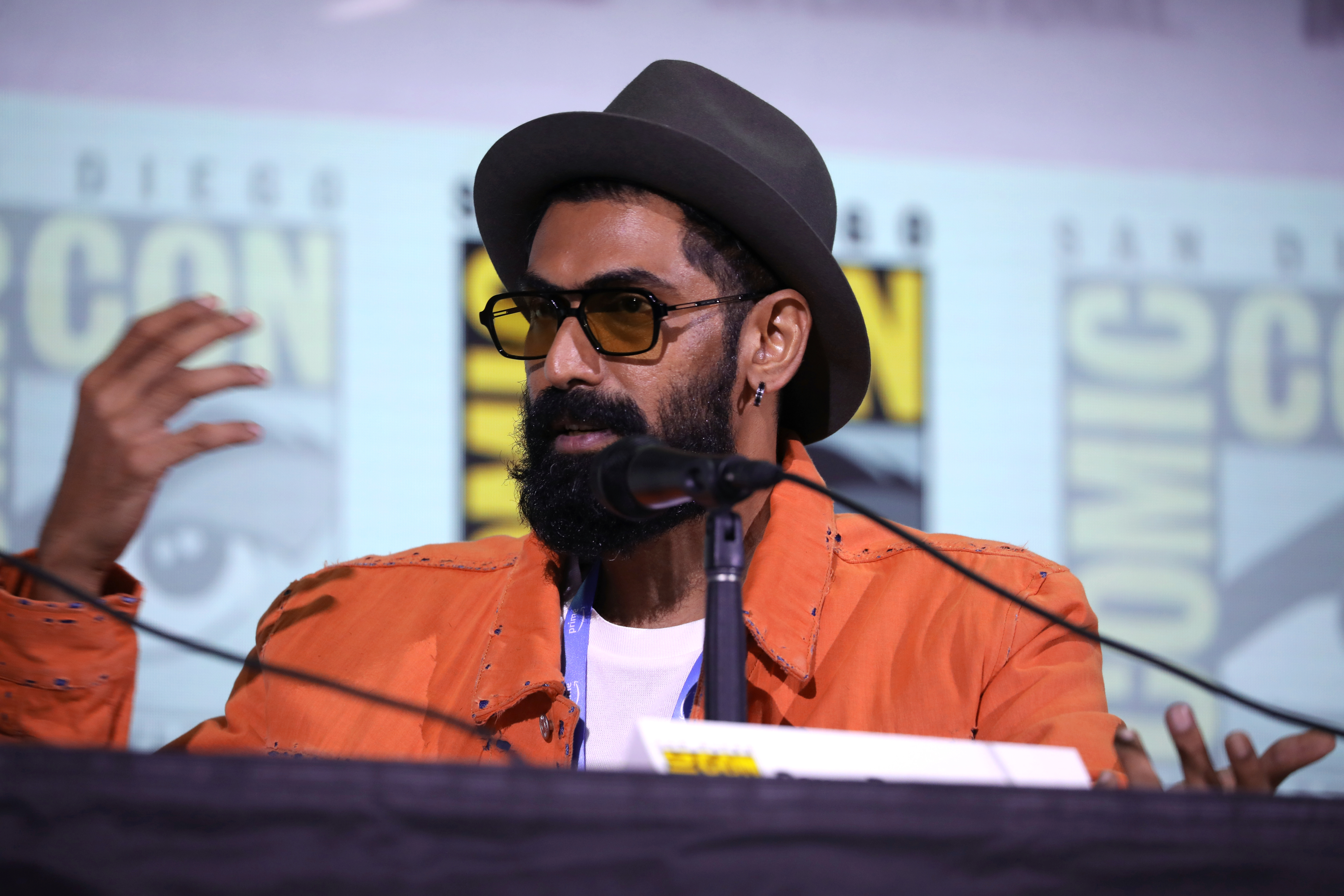
Rana Daggubati at the 2023 San Diego Comic-Con

In 2018, he made a cameo appearance in the Hindi comedy film Welcome to New York. In March 2018, he joined the production of two-part N. T. Rama Rao biographical film series. He played the role of chief minister of Andhra Pradesh N. Chandrababu Naidu in two films – NTR: Kathanayakudu and NTR: Mahanayakudu, which were released in January 2019 and February 2019. Both the films were commercial failures and received mixed reviews from the critics. He next appeared in a dual role in the Hindi film Housefull 4 and made a cameo appearance in the song "Naan Pizhaippeno" of the Tamil film Enai Noki Paayum Thota.

Rana's much awaited film, Kaadan (in Tamil; Aranya in Telugu) released in March 2021, after twice rescheduling its release date. Owing to the COVID-19 pandemic in India, the release of Hindi version Haathi Mere Saathi too was postponed. Tamil and Telugu versions however released as scheduled. Rana shed 30 kilograms to look lean for his role in the film. Haricharan Pudipeddi of Hindustan Times appreciated Rana's performance, calling it "one of his best till date." The Hans India called his performance "exceptional".

Rana had two film releases in 2022, the action thriller Bheemla Nayak and period action drama Virata Parvam. He began filming for the Bheemla Nayak, co-starring Pawan Kalyan in January 2021. Rana was most recently seen co starring in the Netflix series Rana Naidu alongside his uncle Venkatesh. It is an official adaptation of the American crime drama series Ray Donovan.

== Production ==
Before his debut as an actor in 2010, he started his own production company, Spirit Media, which made the National Film Award winning animation film, Bommalata (2004). He is also a partner in his family's production house, Ramanaidu Studios. He is also invested in many other ventures as well.

== Business ventures and other works ==
Five years before becoming an actor, in 2005, Rana entered the visual effects business with Spirit Media. The company specialised in animation and VFX, and worked on over 70 films.

Along with films, he also starred in a web series called Social. Since 2017, Rana is the host of the Telugu Television talk-show No. 1 Yaari. The show has completed four seasons over a span of five years, hosting celebrities such as Vijay Deverakonda, S.S. Rajamouli, Nani, Kajal Aggarwal, Naga Chaitanya, Tamannaah, Rakul Preet Singh, Ram Pothineni, Navdeep, Nikhil Siddharth, and others. He also dubbed for the character Thanos in the Telugu dubbed version of Avengers: Infinity War.

In 2018, he entered into a joint venture with Kwan Entertainment and Marketing Solutions. Set up as a studio style agency, Kwan South's divisions include talent management, casting, live performances and appearances, film packaging, production support- TV and Commercials, brand associations- endorsements, digital and film partnerships. It was expanded with an office in Chennai.

Following the business venture, in the same year, he tied up with Anthill Ventures, an investment and scaling platform for early growth stage start-ups, to launch Anthill Studio. Anthill Studio is a business accelerator program focused on technology startups in Media & Entertainment. The studio supports and mentors disruptive startups in leading-edge technologies such as Artificial intelligence (AI), augmented reality and virtual reality (AR/VR), blockchain, visual effects (VFX), cloud rendering, machine learning (ML), internet of things (IoT) and big data and analytics.

In 2019, he bought a stake in the one of India's leading comic book companies, Amar Chitra Katha and became director of the company, backed by Future Group. In March 2019, he opened a learning center for art and design, life skills, performing arts and vedic science and ethics in Hyderabad. The same year, he acquired the co-ownership of Hyderabad FC, a professional football club based in Hyderabad. The club competes in the Indian Super League. After acquiring ownership, Rana stated "Hyderabad has a great legacy with the sport. This team, therefore, is a chance to rekindle that legacy."

Rana has launched his own YouTube channel SouthBay. Live on 15 November 2020. Reportedly, the channel streams various content including podcasts, fiction and non-fictions unscripted shows, live chat shows, music, animation, etc.

In 2022, Rana launched a men's grooming platform named DCRAF in association with Roposo. DCRAF is a part of Roposo's Glance digital initiative.

In 2024, Daggubati invested in the clothing brand 'Kingdom of White' and became its brand ambassador.

== Personal life and public image ==
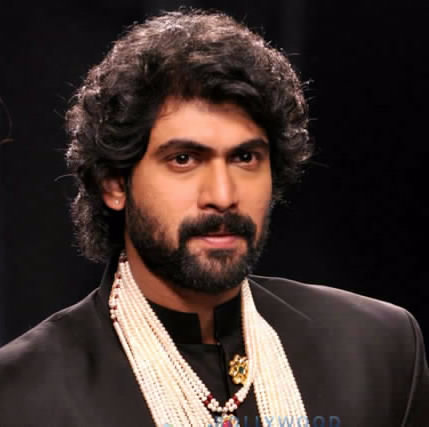
Daggubati in IIJW 2013

During the 2010s, Rana was in a relationship with Trisha Krishnan, from which they both parted ways and remained civil and friends. Rana got engaged to his girlfriend, Miheeka Bajaj, founder of Dew Drop Design Studio, on 20 May 2020 at Ramanaidu Studios. They married on 8 August 2020 at Ramanaidu Studios.

Rana has appeared in Forbes India's Celebrity 100 list in 2017 at the 36th position. He was ranked twentieth on the Times' 50 Most Desirable Men for the year 2011, tenth in 2012, thirteenth in 2013, seventeenth in 2014, eleventh in 2015, twenty-fourth in 2016, seventh in 2017, nineteenth in 2018, thirteenth in 2019, and twenty-eighth in 2020. For the year 2011, he was voted "The Most Promising Newcomer of 2011" for the same poll. He was ranked twenty-ninth in Eastern Eye's "Sexiest Asian Men", in 2015. In 2011, he was featured in GQ India's Best Dressed Men list. He was the eleventh most searched celebrity in 2017, on Google Search.

Rana have signed endorsement deal with Upon in 2020 and with CEAT in 2021. In addition, he has been the brand ambassador of Telugu Titans in the Pro Kabaddi League. On 1 June 2021, Sony Pictures Networks India have launched the sports channel Sony Ten 4, for which Rana was signed as the brand ambassador and promoter. In March 2025, an FIR was filed against him for the alleged promotion of betting apps and platforms.

== Awards and nominations ==
National Film Awards

- Best Feature Film in Telugu – Co-producer (Spirit Media) – Bommalata (2007)

Filmfare Awards South

- Best Male Debut – Leader (2010)
- Best Supporting Actor – Telugu – Baahubali 2: The Conclusion (2018)
- Best Supporting Actor – Telugu – Bheemla Nayak (2024)

Nandi Awards

- Best Special Effects (Spirit Media) – Sainikudu (2006)
- Best Villain – Baahubali: The Beginning (2015).

Zee Cine Awards

- Best Male Debut – Dum Maro Dum (2011)

SIIMA Awards

- Youth Icon of South Indian Cinema (2011)
- Best Actor Critics' – Telugu – Krishnam Vande Jagadgurum (2012)
- Best Actor in a Negative Role – Telugu – Baahubali: The Beginning (2016)
- Best Actor in a Negative Role – Telugu – Baahubali 2: The Conclusion (2018)
- Entertainer of the Year – Baahubali 2: The Conclusion / Ghazi / Nene Raju Nene Mantri
- Best Supporting Actor – Telugu – Bheemla Nayak (2023)

IIFA Utsavam

- Best Actor in a Negative Role – Baahubali: The Beginning (2016)

Asiavision Movie Awards

- Best Actor (From south) – Baahubali: The Beginning (2015)

CineMAA Awards

- Best Male Debut – Leader (2010)
- Best Villain – Baahubali: The Beginning (2016)

Santosham Film Awards

- Best Villain Award – Baahubali: The Beginning (2016)
