= Agyaat =

- Theatrical release poster
- Directed by: Ram Gopal Varma
- Written by: Nilesh Girkar; Puneet Gandhi
- Produced by: Ronnie Screwvala; Ram Gopal Varma
- Starring: Nithiin; Priyanka Kothari; Gautam Rode; Rasika Dugal
- Cinematography: Surjodeep Ghosh
- Edited by: Nipun Gupta
- Music by: Songs: Imran-Vikram; Bapi-Tutul; Score: Amar Mohile
- Production companies: UTV Motion Pictures; Deamforce Enterprise
- Distributed by: UTV Motion Pictures
- Release date: 7 August 2009 (India)
- Running time: 102 minutes
- Country: India
- Language: Hindi

Agyaat (transl. Anonymous) is a 2009 Indian Hindi-language horror film directed by Ram Gopal Varma, starring Nithiin, Gautam Rode, Rasika Dugal, and Priyanka Kothari in the leading roles. It follows a filmmaking crew stuck in a forest and struggling to survive after becoming the target of an unknown invisible entity/creature.

The film was released on 7 August 2009. It was dubbed and released simultaneously in Telugu as Adavi. The film was shot mainly at Sigiriya jungle in Sri Lanka, with some scenes in the Athirappilly forests in Cochin, Kerala, India. In order to combat piracy, the film's DVD was simultaneously and exclusively released internationally. It was a commercial disappointment, and the sequel Agyaat 2 teased in the end credits never materialized.

== Synopsis ==
A film unit goes for a shoot in a forest but get stuck deep in the jungle. Resulting in a four-day delay, the 9-member cast and crew of a Bollywood movie, including leading lady Aasha, and her egotistical co-star, Sharman Kapoor, decide to relax and take an outing with their guide, Setu. They end up at a picturesque spot and decide to spend the night there not realizing they will soon be stalked and brutally killed by an invisible beast and/or an extraterrestrial entity.

=== Backstory ===
The creature in Agyaat might have originated from space. A spaceship, while exploring deep space, received strange and eerie signals. Curious, the astronauts decided to investigate, but their actions led to a dangerous alien boarding the ship. The creature began killing the astronauts one by one. In the chaos, the spaceship's controls were accidentally triggered, sending the ship hurtling back towards Earth. It eventually crash-landed in the jungles of Sigiriya, Sri Lanka, at night, close to where a film crew is camping for an outdoor shoot. The creature survived the crash and began stalking the film crew in the jungle, using its hunting instincts to kill them off one by one, just like it had done with the astronauts. The film crew, unaware of its extraterrestrial origins, found themselves trapped in a deadly struggle for survival.

=== Real life incident ===
The film is inspired by real-life experiences of the cast and crew during the shooting of Varma's earlier film, Jungle (2000), which was filmed in the Bandipur forest reserve in Karnataka. During the production of Jungle, members of the film unit reported feeling being watched while shooting in the dense jungle. Some cast members, including lead actors, expressed discomfort and a sense of being stalked. One crew member reportedly lost her way for several hours and, upon returning, was unable to communicate and chose to leave the jungle for Mumbai immediately. Varma noted that while the experiences were not explicitly supernatural, they contributed to an unsettling atmosphere among the crew, leading to speculation about the cause of their feelings—ranging from paranormal activity to concerns about local wildlife or the presence of notorious criminals, such as Veerappan's men. These eerie incidents served as the basis for Agyaat, which explores themes of suspense and the unknown in a similar setting.

== Cast ==
- Nitin Reddy as Sujal
- Gautam Rode as Sharman Kapoor
- Priyanka Kothari as Aasha
- Ravi Kale as Rakka
- Ishrat Ali as Moorthy
- Howard Rosemeyer as JJ
- Kali Prasad Mukherjee as Shekhar "Shaky"
- Rasika Dugal as Sameera
- Joy Fernandes as Sethu
- Ishtiyak Khan as Laxman

== Music ==
Song	Music	Lyrics	Singer(s)	Duration	Notes
"Jai Shiv Bum Shambhu"	Imran-Vikram	Prashant Pandey	Runa Rizvi & Bonnie Chakraborty	5:06	Song starring Gautam Rode and Priyanka Kothari
"Kiss You Day And Night"	Imran-Vikram	Sandeep Singh	Bhaven, Banjotsana & Earl	4:34	Song starring Nitin Reddy and Priyanka Kothari
"Koobsurat"	Bapi-Tutul	Prashant Pandey	Shweta Pandit & Vicky B. Joshi	4:41	Song starring Nitin Reddy and Priyanka Kothari (Not included in the film)
"Sunsakte Ho"	Bapi - Tutul	Sarim Momin	Shweta Pandit	3:49	Background piece
"Jungle Jungle"	Imran-Vikram	Sarim Momin	Jankee & Imran	3:43	Promotional song starring Priyanka Kothari
"Na Koi"	Bapi - Tutul	Prashant Pandey	Keka Ghoshal & Bapi Tutul	3:50	Background piece
"Kiss Mix"	Imran-Vikram	Sandeep Singh	Bhaven, Banjotsana, Earl & Jankee	3:43	Remix

== Reception ==
Rajeev Masand of CNN-IBN gave the film 3/5 (Watchable), stating "At a time when special effects and digital tricks can be used to create just about anything, here's a reminder that what really scares us is the stuff we can't see".

Nikhat Kazmi of Times of India gave the film 3/5 and noted "It neither thrills nor chills with its repetitive running-for-life sequences and its absolutely infuriating end which offers no explanation whatsoever for the scurrying and screaming".

Subhash K Jha (IBOS) gave 3.5/5 noting "Jungle fever has never been more contagious. Every corner of the Sri Lankan jungle as shot with mesmeric skill by the cinematographer Surjodeep Ghosh is filled with danger."

Taran Adarsh gave this movie a rating of 3/5 saying, "Ramgopal Varma thinks differently. This time too, the maverick film-maker defies the stereotype and takes to the dense forests of Sri Lanka to meet an 'unknown' force" and explains further "But let's clear the misconception at the very start. Agyaat is no supernatural thriller (like Phoonk) or a horror fest (like Bhoot). This one's more of an adventure thriller that doesn't scare you at all, but makes you a participant in a pulse-pounding journey".

== Sequel ==
In Agyaat, Sujal and Aasha, the only survivors of a horrific ordeal, manage to escape the jungle after their film crew is attacked by an unseen creature. In Agyaat 2, Sujal and Aasha report the events to the authorities, prompting Nitin to return to the jungle with police to locate the sites of the crew's deaths. Afterward, Sujal and Aasha return to the city and get married, unaware that the creature has followed them into this new setting, leading to a continuation of their conflict in an urban environment. Much like Agyaat drew inspiration from Predator, Agyaat 2 follows a storyline similar to Predator 2, where the creature transitions from the wilderness to the city, bringing the threat to a populated area. The movie is also inspired by other Hollywood thrillers like Anaconda and Alien.
