= Vishal Sinha =

Indian cinematographer (born 1975)

- Born: 7 March 1975 (age 51); Mumbai, Maharashtra, India
- Occupations: Cinematographer, Photographer
- Years active: 2003–present
- Spouse: Maria Philipose Sinha (2003–present)
- Children: Vir Sinha
- Website: vishalsinhadop.com

Vishal Sinha (born 7 March 1975) is an Indian cinematographer who works in Hindi films. He has shot films such as Darna Mana Hai (2003), Bhoot (2003), Ab Tak Chhappan (2004), and Raanjhanaa (2015). He debuted as an independent cinematographer with the film Bhoot directed by Ram Gopal Verma, and worked as camera operator in Ketan Mehta's Mangal Pandey: The Rising. Besides feature films, he has also shot many advertising films, documentaries and short films.

== Filmography ==
Year	Film	Language	Notes
2003	Bhoot	Hindi	
2003	Darna Mana Hai	Hindi	
2004	Ab Tak Chhappan	Hindi	
2005	Mangal Pandey: The Rising	Hindi	Camera operator
2006	Chingaari	Hindi	
2007	Viva Sunita!	Hindi	Short film
2010	Allah Ke Banday	Hindi	
2013	Raanjhnaa	Hindi	
2013	Outpost	Hindi	Short film
2013	Issaq	Hindi	
2014	Bobby Jasoos	Hindi	
2017	Phillauri	Hindi	
2019	Jabariya Jodi	Hindi	
2019	Drive	Hindi	
2022	Chup: Revenge of the Artist	Hindi	
2023	Ghoomer	Hindi	
2024	Phir Aayi Hasseen Dillruba	Hindi	
2025	Inspector Zende	Hindi	
2026	Governor	Hindi	

== Nominations ==
=== Zee Cine Awards ===
- Best Cinematography - Ab Tak Chhappan
- Best Cinematography - Raanjhanaa
