= Nilesh Girkar =

Indian screenwriter

Nilesh Dashrath Girkar is an Indian scriptwriter who works for Hindi and Telugu films. He started his career writing for Ram Gopal Varma's Agyaat (2009). He has also written Ram Gopal Varma’s Department (2012), Sarkar 3, and Nana Patekar's Ab Tak Chhappan 2 (2015).

== Background ==
Girkar was born and brought up in Mumbai in a middle-class family, and was an avid Bollywood fan from childhood. Graduating in Physics from the University of Mumbai, he worked in Quality Assurance in a Medical Transcription BPO in Mumbai for a few years before quitting in 2008. After meeting Boman Irani on the set of Bollywood Ka Boss Filmy Gyan Quiz Show in 2008, he focused his career on screenplay writing.

Before becoming a full-time scriptwriter he had assisted Marathi Theater writer/director Devendra Pem for two years, working on his theatrical play Lali-Lila. He also worked as an actor, back stage, and in various capacities in Marathi Theater for various one-act plays.

He wrote his first script in the office while still working at the medical transcription firm. He got his first break at Ram Gopal Varma's Dreamforce Enterprise with Agyaat in 2009.

Girkar won a dispute with Ram Gopal Varma over his writing credits for the movie Sarkar 3.

== Filmography ==
Sl. No	Film	Status	Year	Contribution
1.	Sarkar 3	Released	2017	Story
2.	Ab Tak Chhappan 2	Released	2015	Story, Screenplay, & Dialogue
3.	Department	Released	2012	Story, Screenplay, & Dialogue
4.	Dongala Mutha (Telugu)	Released	2011	Story, Screenplay
5.	Katha Screenplay Darshakatvam Appalaraju (Telugu)	Released	2011	Story, Screenplay
6.	Agyaat	Released	2009	Written By
