= Morning Raga =

- American theatrical release poster
- Directed by: Mahesh Dattani
- Written by: Mahesh Dattani
- Produced by: K. Raghavendra Rao
- Starring: Shabana Azmi; Prakash Kovelamudi; Perizaad Zorabian; Lillete Dubey; Nassar
- Cinematography: Rajiv Menon
- Edited by: A. Sreekar Prasad
- Music by: Mani Sharma; Amit Heri
- Production companies: RK Teleshow; Arka Media Works
- Distributed by: UTV Motion Pictures
- Release dates: October 29, 2004 (India); March 25, 2005 (United States)
- Running time: 110 minutes (American release); 90 minutes (Indian release)
- Language: English
- Budget: ₹1.5 crore
- Box office: ₹30.5 lacs

Morning Raga is a 2004 Indian English-language musical drama film written and directed by Mahesh Dattani and produced by K. Raghavendra Rao under Arka Media Works. It stars Shabana Azmi, Prakash Kovelamudi, Perizaad Zorabian, Lillete Dubey and Nassar. The film has an extensive use of English dialogue, in addition to the Godavari dialect of Telugu language.

The film focuses on three main characters — all Telugu — whose lives have each been ruined by past tragedies and how they are united by circumstance. These three are all connected by a love of music, and through this, the film explores elements of classical Indian Carnatic music, the raga, and contemporary Indian music. The film was also dubbed into Telugu as Ragam.

== Plot ==
The film begins with a collage of idealised village life in south India, with a Carnatic classical song in the background, being rendered by Swarnalata, the lady of a prosperous land-owning family. Abhinay is the youthful son of another affluent landowning family belonging to the same village. His parents are dead, and he is heir to his grandfather, who owns extensive farmlands and property. Abhinay is not keen on the life of a landowner. He has grown up in the city and wants to start a music troupe, playing western pop music, which is entirely alien to this society.

It is the death anniversary of Abhinay's parents, and his grandfather performs the usual Hindu ceremonies on the riverbank every year. This time, after many years, Abhinay is with him. As they arrive at the riverbank, a lady who has just finished performing the same rituals is leaving. She is Swarnalatha, and when she sees a young boy with Nasser, she looks intensely at the young man. Abhinay is intrigued by her look, and after some hesitation, he leaves his grandfather and follows the lady through the village streets. A car suddenly appears and almost crashes into a distracted and careless Abhinay but swerves away in the nick of time and hits some bushes. This incident causes great and visible trauma to Swarnalatha, who now runs homeward. Abhinay, who has fallen on his face, is unable to follow her further. He meets the driver of the car, the beautiful and strikingly modern city girl Pinky. The car having broken down, Pinky has nowhere to stay in the village; Abhinay takes her home, where his grandfather invites her to stay a few days while her car is repaired.

Swarnalatha is a classically trained Carnatic singer who lost her son and best friend, Vaishnavi, in a bus accident. The story reopens after 20 years when Vaishnavi's son plans to leave his business of composing jingles with a desire to start a music troupe to compose everlasting music just like the Charminar, and with these plans, he returns to his home. His plan irks his father, who wants him to look after the ancestral lands in the village. On the death anniversary of Vaishnavi, Abhinay spots Swarnalatha and hears her singing the temple. When Swarnalatha leaves the temple, Abhinay stops her, saying that she knew his mother, and follows her. The duo reaches the bridge when a car comes and hits Abhinay, and the car was being driven by Pinky. Swarnalatha screams and reaches her home, with the 20-year-old guilt in her mind that her one step on the bridge caused the accident. Here, the car gets a glitch, and Pinky is compelled to stay for the night in the village.

The next morning, both Abhinay and Pinky set out for Hyderabad to seek the perfect artists for the proposed troop, and they get a guitarist and a drummer, Balaji. All land up at Pinky's boutique, whose environment irritates Abhinay, but somehow Pinky consoles him and the practices start, with a few opportunities coming their way, but their rock band does not receive the respect as Abhinay had expected. After a few days, Abhinay receives the violin that his mother used to play when she was alive. He returns to the village to return the violin to Swarnalatha, saying that both her voice and the sound of the violin are complementary to each other and one cannot exist without one another, and invites her to sing with their troupe, for which she refuses, saying that she will not come to the city, and returns the violin. Swarnalatha's husband asks him to bring his troupe to the house on Ganesh Chaturthi. The troupe arrives on the said date, and Swarnalatha starts singing, but stops in between and sings the sophisticated svaram of the song, for which no compatible music could be played. That evening, Abhinay again compels Swarnalatha to sing in the city, but she again refuses, and he ends the communication with the note that she owes him a lot as he is her best friend's son, after all.

The next morning, Abhinay's father expresses his dislike in his son's musical career in front of Swarnalatha, and at the same time, Swarnalatha agrees to sing for Abhinay in the city. She starts from her house with her husband. On the way, their car breaks down, and they are forced to take the bus, which crosses the bridge. Swarnalatha starts screaming, stops the bus, and starts running and falls ill. Both return home, and her husband reports that she cannot come for singing. The next day Swarnalatha personally calls Pinky and asks her to learn Carnatic music. Pinky learns Carnatic music from Swarnalatha. After a few days, Abhinay plans a concert, though for Pinky to sing, but always urges Swarnalatha to come for singing, but she continues to express her reluctance because she considers the bridge as a punishment for her ambitions. One day, while driving, Pinky gets irked at the repetitive reluctance of Swarnalatha and speeds up the car and crosses the bridge, and Swarna starts yelling for her to stop the car. Finally, Pinky stops the car and reveals that her father was drunk and was responsible for the accident. The film ends with the concert in which Swarnalatha appears and sings "Thaaye Yashoda" on repeated urging from Pinky, and the concert becomes a 10-week hit.

== Cast ==
- Shabana Azmi as Swarnalata
- Prakash Kovelamudi as Abhinay
- Perizaad Zorabian as Pinky
- Lilette Dubey as Pinky's mother
- Nassar as Abhinay's father
- Dharmavarapu Subramanyam as Appa Rao
- Shaleen Sharma as Balaji
- Ranjani Ramakrishnan as Vaishnavi
- Vivek Mashru as Munna
- Thalaivasal Vijay as Swarnalata's husband

== Production ==
Shabana Azmi was trained intensively in Carnatic music by Ranjani Ramakrishnan before she was allowed to sing during the film. The house used for her character's home is a historic zamindar country mansion and estate near the village of Kulla in East Godavari district.

== Soundtrack ==
Tr. #	Track name	Artist(s)
1	"Mahaganapatim"	Bombay Jayashree
2	"Thaye Yashoda"	Sudha Ragunathan; Ranjani Ramakrishnan
3	"Mathey"	Sudha Raghunathan; Kalyani Menon
4	"Pibare Ramarasam"	Kalyani Menon
5	"Samaja Varagamana"	Gayathri
6	"Todi Alaap"	Kalyani Menon
7	"Remembering His Violin"	Gayathri
8	"City Interlude"	Instrumental
9	"Alaap Jam"	Nandini Srikar
10	"Coffee Shop Montage"	Sunitha Sarathy
11	"Charminar"	Veena; Rajesh Vaidya
12	"The Chase"	Gayathri
13	"Jagado Dharana"	Bombay Jayashree; Nandini Srikar
14	"Mahaganapatim Jam"	Bombay Jayashree

== Reception ==
A critic from The Hindu wrote that "All is well till the characters start talking. That is when "Morning Raga," Mahesh Dattani, falls flat". A critic from Rediff.com wrote that "The film is excessively escapist in terms of human emotion, and relies on everybody eventually liking everybody else in the end, and confessing all. Moments of conflict and inner turmoil in Morning Raga are like item numbers, quick and engaging, but utterly disconnected to the rest of the film".
