= Méhul (surname) =

Méhul is a French surname.

Notable people with this surname include:

- Étienne Méhul (1763–1817), French composer
- Joseph Daussoigne-Méhul (1790–1875), Belgian-French composer and music educator

== See also ==
- Mehul, Indian given name
