= Tanmay Jahagirdar =

Indian actor

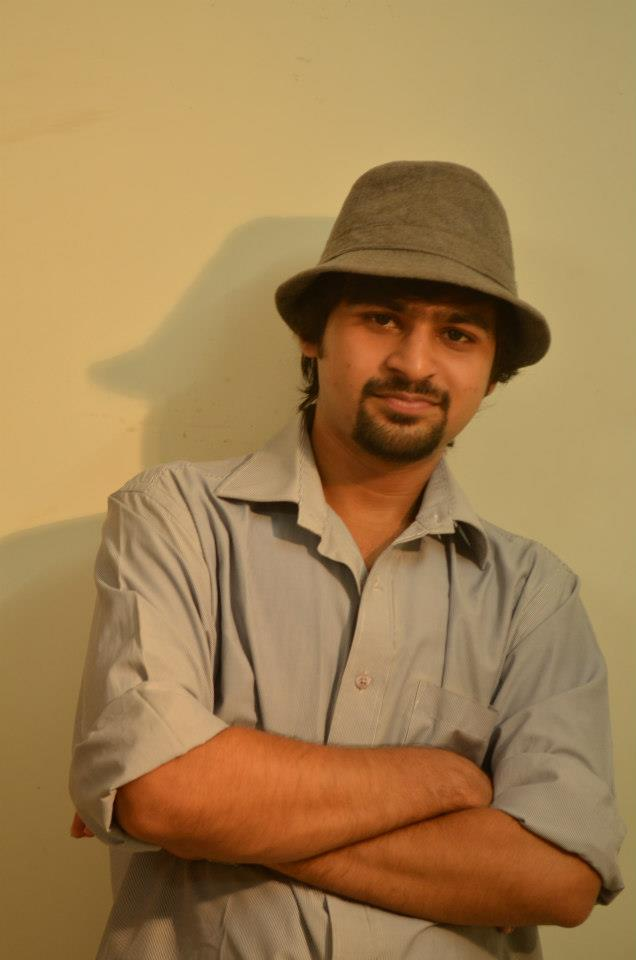
- Born: 1 November 1990 (age 35); Mumbai, Maharashtra, India
- Occupation: Actor/Director
- Years active: 2000–present
- Parent(s): Vilas Jahagirdar; Madhuri Jahagirdar

Tanmay Jahagirdar (born 1 November 1990) is an Indian film and television actor, and a former child actor. He is well known as a "One Take" actor. He has appeared in several TV shows, commercials and Bollywood films. The role that popularized him was that of the small child (Aman) of an encounter specialist (Nana Patekar) in the film Ab Tak Chhappan (2004), a role he played at age 13. He made his debut as an adult in Ab Tak Chhappan 2 (2015).

== Career ==
Jahagirdar's career started as a child artist through television, commercial advertisements and films. In 2002, he appeared in the film The truth - Yathharth, a feature film based on the dark shades of life hidden in rural India. The film's star cast includes Milind Gunaji, Raghuveer Yadav and Shraddha Nigam.

He played Raghu, the character who and supports his friend Bijuria (Shraddha Nigam) through the ups and downs of his life. He was seen in Aryamaan - Brahmaand Ka Yodha, a sci-fi series where he worked with an actor, Mukesh Khanna; he earned a lot of appreciation for the character he played. He appeared in Shaka Laka Boom Boom, a series based on a magical pencil aired on Star Plus. Since then, it was no looking back for this talent in the Television Industry. Next, he appeared in a lead role in the serial Kya Mujhse Dosti Karoge on Hungama TV. He has done advertisement commercials. He has worked for some brands in India. The Siyaram Suitings Ad featuring Diya Mirza and Boris Becker (International Tennis Player) has this kid, who played a role of an adorable and naughty Rajasthani kid. He also acted in commercials like BSA-ibike, Parry's Lacto King, etc. These all advertisements represent a nostalgic era of TV.

He acted in Ram Gopal Verma's film Ab Tak Chappan (2004). He played a role of Nana Patekar's character, Sadhu Agashe's son, Aman. After this, he appeared in the film Phir Kabhi(2009). He portrayed the role of a young school boy, representing the childhood memory of the character played by Gulshan Grover. He was seen in a comic role and has shown his commendable comic sense. He was also seen in one of the episodes of a very popular series Adalat on Sony TV in 2011. He has played roles into different genres such as thriller, comedy, drama, sci-fi superhero, etc. He has worked with recognized banners such as UTV Motion Pictures, RGV Productions, etc.

Recently, he made his comeback through Ab Tak Chhappan 2 (2015), in which he played the role of Sadhu Agashe's grown up son Aman.

== Filmography ==
Actor
Year	Film	Role	Notes
2002	The Truth Yathharth	Raghu	As a child artist
2004	Ab Tak Chhappan	Aman	As a child artist
2009	Phir Kabhi		As a child artist
2015	Ab Tak Chhappan 2	Aman	Debut film as Adult

=== Television ===
Year	Show
2002	Aryamaan - Brahmaand Ka Yodha
2003–04	Shaka Laka Boom Boom
2007	Kya Mujhse Dosti Karoge
