= The Rana Daggubati Show =

Indian talk-show

- Genre: Talk show
- Created by: Rana Daggubati
- Written by: Faiz Rai; Vineeth Kalegi
- Directed by: Sukhvinder Singh Chauhan (Episode 1; 6–7); Vinod Vijayan Thazvana (Episode 2–3); Srikanth Prabhala (Episode 4–5); Pratyusha Jonnalagadda (Episode 8)
- Presented by: Rana Daggubati
- Music by: Naren RK Siddhartha
- Country of origin: India
- Original language: Telugu
- No. of seasons: 1

Production
- Executive producer: Rana Daggubati
- Producer: Rajeev Ranjan
- Production locations: Ramanaidu Studios, Hyderabad
- Cinematography: Sukhvinder Singh Chauhan
- Camera setup: Multi-camera
- Production company: Spirit Media

Original release
- Network: Amazon Prime Video
- Release: 23 November 2024 – 11 January 2025

The Rana Daggubati Show is an Indian Telugu-language variety talk show created and hosted by Rana Daggubati. It premiered on 23 November 2024 on Amazon Prime Video.

== Production ==
Rana has previously hosted No. 1 Yaari with Rana (2017–2021). During the "Prime Video Presents" event held in March 2024, the show was announced under the initial title The Rana Connection. Rana was the creator and also the executive producer through Spirit Media. Ahead of its premiere, the title was changed to The Rana Daggubati Show.

The first episode premiered at the 55th International Film Festival of India in Goa on 21 November 2024, and later on Amazon Prime Video on 23 November 2024.

== Episodes ==
| No. | Title | Premiere | Guest(s) |
|---|---|---|---|
| 1 | "Normal Is Boring" | 23 November 2024 | Nani, Teja Sajja, Priyanka Mohan |
| 2 | "And Just Like That" | 30 November 2024 | Sreeleela, Siddhu Jonnalagadda |
| 3 | "Cousins, Cars and Cinema" | 7 December 2024 | Naga Chaitanya, Sumanth, Miheeka Daggubati, Malavika Potluri Daggubati, Prashanth |
| 4 | "Master Influencers" | 14 December 2024 | S. S. Rajamouli, Ram Gopal Varma, Suma Kanakala |
| 5 | "Myth Buster" | 21 December 2024 | Rishab Shetty, Neha Shetty, Pragathi Shetty |
| 6 | "When THE GOOD BOY meets BAD BOY" | 28 December 2024 | Dulquer Salmaan, Meenakshi Chaudhary |
| 7 | "Getting Real with the Real Star" | 4 January 2025 | Upendra, Navdeep, Faria Abdullah, Sharmiela Mandre |
| 8 | "V for Victory" | 11 January 2025 | Venkatesh, Aishwarya Rajesh, Meenakshi Chaudhary, Anil Ravipudi, Ramana Gogula |

== Reception ==
Raisa Nasreen of Times Now stated that it "was clean and didn't fall prey to the traditional gossip sessions which shows indulge in".
