= Kirti M. Doongursee College =

Undergraduate college in Mumbai, India

- Established: 1954; 72 years ago (as 'Bombay College')
- Founder: Maharshi Dhondo Keshav Karve
- Academic affiliations: University of Mumbai
- Principal: Dr. Anil Markandeya
- Students: 5000+
- Location: Kashinath Dhuru Marg, Prabhadevi, Dadar (West), Mumbai, India
- Website: kirticollege.edu.in

Kirti M. Doongursee College (also known as Kirti M. Doongursee College of Arts, Science and Commerce and Kirti College) is located in Dadar (West), Mumbai-400028 Maharashtra, India.

== History ==
The college was founded by the Deccan Education Society as Bombay College. The foundation stone was laid by Maharshi Dhondo Keshav Karve and the college started operating in 1954.

In 1960, Bombay College was renamed Kirti M. Doongursee College in a ceremony in the presence of Dr. Sarvepalli Radhakrishnan, the first Vice President of India.

It is affiliated to the University of Mumbai and offers an extensive range of courses. One of its most well-known alumni is Sachin Tendulkar, whose father Ramesh Tendulkar used to teach at the college.

== Notable alumni ==
- Sachin Tendulkar
- Pravin Amre
- Anjali Bhagwat
- Amol Muzumdar
- Boman Irani
- Nilesh Pingle
- Sudhir Joshi
- Srinivas Prabhu
- Manya Surve
- Harshada Khanvilkar
- Rajesh Mapuskar
