= Sainikudu =

- Sainikudu Promotional poster
- Directed by: Gunasekhar
- Written by: Story & Screenplay: Gunasekhar; Dialogues: Paruchuri Brothers
- Produced by: C. Aswani Dutt; Swapna Dutt
- Starring: Mahesh Babu; Trisha; Irrfan Khan; Prakash Raj
- Cinematography: Balasubramaniem
- Edited by: A. Sreekar Prasad
- Music by: Harris Jayaraj
- Production company: Vyjayanthi Movies
- Distributed by: Vyjayanthi Movies
- Release date: 30 November 2006
- Running time: 169 minutes
- Country: India
- Language: Telugu
- Budget: ₹250 million

Sainikudu (transl. Soldier) is a 2006 Indian Telugu-language political action drama film co-written and directed by Gunasekhar and produced by C. Aswani Dutt and Swapna Dutt. It stars Mahesh Babu, Trisha and Irrfan Khan in the lead roles, while Prakash Raj, Kota Srinivasa Rao, Telangana Shakuntala, and Ajay play supporting roles. The film marks Irrfan Khan's only Telugu film till date. The music, cinematography and editing were handled by Harris Jayaraj, Balasubramaniem and A. Sreekar Prasad.

Sainikudu was released on 30 November 2006. The film was partially reshot in Tamil as Kumaran, with a comedy track involving Vadivelu.

== Plot ==
Siddharth and his friends saves the people from floods at Ranga Saipet, Warangal district. Parakala Purushottam Yadav alias Pappu Yadav, a former gangster recommended for Assembly Elections by the CM, gets the attention of people by announcing a sum of ₹50 million for flood victims. Siddharth learns that the food needed for the flood victims has been taken elsewhere to be sold, which is an illegal way to earn money and backing up the flood relief fund into the pockets of the politicians.

Siddharth saves the stock in time and takes it to the flood victims for distribution, thus annoying Pappu. J. Venkat Rao alias "Mondi Naani", Pappu's right-hand, threatens Siddharth and a strife develops between Mondi Naani and Siddharth. Siddharth later declares that his friend Ajay Kumar will be contesting the election against Pappu Yadav. Siddharth and his team get accolades from the people for this decision and start campaigning. To cut the good name of Siddharth's group in the people and to win sympathy, Pappu Yadav conspires for a bomb blast allegation on Siddharth and his team.

The mission gets accomplished and Pappu declares Siddharth and his team as terrorists. Pappu becomes the Home Minister and his marriage is settled with Varalakshmi, a talkative woman. Siddharth, with the help of college students, kidnaps Varalakshmi from the marriage hall, demanding that Pappu Yadav confesses his crimes in front of everyone. While being kidnapped, Varalakshmi develops feelings for Siddharth. Pappu Yadav chases after Siddharth to get Varalakshmi back, but Siddharth manages to prove his innocence and puts an end to Pappu, Mondi Naani and other crooked politicians.

== Cast ==
- Mahesh Babu as Cherukuri Siddharth
- Trisha as Varalakshmi
- Irrfan Khan as Parakala Purushottam Yadav alias Pappu Yadav
- Prakash Raj as Jonnalagadda Venkat Rao alias "Mondi Naani"
- Kota Srinivasa Rao as Chief Minister of Andhra Pradesh
- Telangana Shakuntala as ACP Pochamma, Pappu Yadav's acolyte
- Ajay as Ajay Kumar, Siddharth's friend
- Ravi Varma as Ravi, Siddharth's friend
- Ravi Prakash as Siva, Siddharth's friend
- Narsing Yadav as Narasimha, Pappu Yadav's lawyer
- Paruchuri Venkateswara Rao as Venkatachalam IAS, Pappu Yadav's PA
- Kondavalasa Lakshmana Rao as Krishna Rao
- Dharmavarapu Subramanyam as News Reporter Subramanyam
- Raghunatha Reddy as Venkataratnam
- Duvvasi Mohan as Duvvasi
- Prudhviraj as Pappu Yadav's henchman
- Vadivelu as Hotel Server (Tamil version)
- Vennira Aadai Moorthy as Hotel Owner (Tamil version)
- Omakuchi Narasimhan as Hotel Guest (Tamil version)
- Singamuthu as Hotel Guest (Tamil version)
- Bava Lakshmanan as Hotel worker (Tamil version)
- Kamna Jethmalani in an item number in "Orugalluke Pilla"
- Bianca Desai in an item number in "Bylaa Bylamo"

== Music ==
Sainikudu has six songs composed by Harris Jayaraj. The music was released simultaneously in 10 venues from five countries – India, USA, Australia, Singapore and Dubai on the morning of 21 October 2006. The producer of the film, Ashwini Dutt, arranged the use of a satellite transmission to relay the live audio release across the globe. The music proved to be extremely successful upon release. The song "Go Go Go Adhigo" is based on "Smooth Criminal" by Michael Jackson, from his 1987 album Bad. The song "Orugalluke Pilla" is inspired by "Chaiyya Chaiyya" by A. R. Rahman, from the 1998 movie Dil Se.

Sainikudu

Soundtrack album by Harris Jayaraj
- Released: 20 October 2006
- Recorded: 2006
- Genre: Feature film soundtrack
- Length: 32:20
- Language: Telugu
- Label: Aditya Music
- Producer: Harris Jayaraj

Harris Jayaraj chronology
Vettaiyaadu Vilaiyaadu (2006)	Sainikudu (2006)	Pachaikili Muthucharam (2007)

Telugu Track-List
No.	Title	Lyrics	Singer(s)	Length
1.	"Bylaa Bylamo"	Chandrabose	Lesle Lewis, Anushka Manchanda, Sunitha Sarathy	5:42
2.	"Maayeraa Maayeraa (Enthentha Dooram Teeram)"	Kulasekhar	S. P. Balasubrahmanyam, Unnikrishnan, Kavita Krishnamurthy	5:51
3.	"Aadapilla Aggipulla"	Veturi	Hariharan, K. S. Chithra	4:54
4.	"Sogasu Choodatharamaa"	Kulasekhar	Shreya Ghoshal	4:57
5.	"Orugalluke Pilla"	Veturi	Malathi, Karunya, Karthik, Harini	5:43
6.	"Go Go Go Adhigo (Sainikudu)"	Chandrabose	KK & Chorus	5:13
Total length:				32:20

Kumaran

Soundtrack album by Harris Jayaraj
- Released: 2006
- Recorded: 2006
- Genre: Feature film soundtrack
- Length: 30:52
- Language: Tamil
- Label: Divo
- Producer: Harris Jayaraj

Tamil Track-List
No.	Title	Lyrics	Singer(s)	Length
1.	"Bayla Baylamo"	Paruthi	V. V. Prasanna, Mahathi	5:10
2.	"Nizhal Endrum"	Snehan	Ramu, Vinaya	5:20
3.	"Pombala Ellam"	Snehan	Karthik, Anuradha Sriram	4:53
4.	"Sorgathil Pookkum"	Na. Muthukumar	Anuradha Sriram	4:56
5.	"Oru Bambaram"	Viveka	Tippu, Harini, Jayalakshmi	5:43
6.	"Go Go Azhago"	Na. Muthukumar	Senthildass Velayutham	4:50
Total length:				30:52

== Awards ==
- 2006 – Nandi Award for Best Special Effects – Rana
