= Mehul =

Mehul (Hindi: मेहुल) is an Indian male given name of Sanskrit origin, meaning rain or cloud.

Notable people with this name include:

- Mehul Choksi (born 1964/65), Indian businessman
- Mehul Kumar (b. 1949), Indian film director
- Mehul Patel (born 1989), Indian cricketer
- Mehul Shah, American actor

== See also ==
- Méhul, French surname
