= Kaadan =

2021 Indian film by Prabu Solomon

Kaadan Aranya Haathi Mere Saathi
- Release poster (Tamil version)
- Directed by: Prabhu Solomon
- Written by: Prabhu Solomon; Vanamali (Telugu dialogues); Niranjan Iyengar (Hindi dialogues)
- Produced by: Eros International
- Starring: Rana Daggubati; Vishnu Vishal (Tamil and Telugu); Pulkit Samrat (Hindi); Zoya Hussain; Shriya Pilgaonkar
- Cinematography: A. R. Ashok Kumar
- Edited by: Buvan
- Music by: Shantanu Moitra
- Production company: Eros International
- Distributed by: Eros International; Hindi version: Zee Cinema Eros Now
- Release dates: 26 March 2021 (Tamil and Telugu); 18 September 2021 (Hindi)
- Running time: 178 minutes
- Country: India
- Languages: Tamil; Telugu; Hindi

Kaadan (transl. Forester) in Tamil, Aranya (transl. Forester) in Telugu, and Haathi Mere Saathi in Hindi (transl. Elephants are my friends), is a 2021 Indian action adventure film written and directed by Prabhu Solomon. Produced by Eros International, the film stars Rana Daggubati, Vishnu Vishal (Tamil and Telugu), Pulkit Samrat (Hindi), Shriya Pilgaonkar, and Zoya Hussain. It was filmed simultaneously in Tamil, Telugu, and Hindi languages, each with slightly different cast members.

Kaadan and Aranya were released on 26 March 2021, delayed from the initial release of 2 April 2020 due to the COVID-19 pandemic. The theatrical release of Haathi Mere Saathi was put on hold which subsequently opted for a direct-to-video release on Zee Cinema and Eros Now on 18 September 2021. The film was promoted as a comic strip by famous children's magazine, Tinkle as Little Bandev.

== Plot ==
Kaadan (Tamil)/Aranya (Telugu)/Bandev (Hindi) is a true-blue animal film signifying a deep and strong bond between humans and animals.

== Cast ==
Cast (Tamil/Telugu)	Cast (Hindi)	Role (Tamil)	Role (Telugu)	Role (Hindi)
Rana Daggubati		Veerabharathi "Kaadan"	Narendra Bhupathi "Aranya"	Sumitranandan "Bandev"
Vishnu Vishal	Pulkit Samrat	Maaran	Singa	Shankar
Zoya Hussain		Aruvi	Arvi	Arvi
Shriya Pilgaonkar		Arundhati	Arundhati	Arundhati
Ravi Kale		Superintendent of Police	Superintendent of Police	Superintendent of Police
Anant Mahadevan		Kurinjinathan	Kanakamedala Raja Gopalam	Jagannath Sevak
Sheeba Chaddha		Judge	Judge	Judge
Srinath	Paristosh Sand	Attorney	Attorney	Attorney
Bose Venkat	Vishwajeet Pradhan	Divisional Forest Officer	Divisional Forest Officer	Divisional Forest Officer
Raghu Babu	Ankit Sagar	Maaran's uncle	Singa's uncle	Shankar's uncle
Bhuvan Arora		Maadan	Aarav	Aarav
Rayala Harishchandra		Village Head	Village Head	Village Head
Sampath Ram	Alok Gagdekar	Moorthy (DFO)	Aadi (DFO)	Ajit (DFO)
TSR Srinivasan		District Collector	District Collector	District Collector

== Production ==
The film was announced on 13 December 2017. Prabhu Solomon wanted to bring the issue of elephant abuse to the light. Unnikrishnan, an elephant who played a role in Kumki 2, also plays a pivotal role in the film. Hindi actress Zoya Hussain was signed to play a role. Rana Daggubati shed 15 kilograms for this film by eating vegetarian food for six weeks. The makers initially announced Kalki Koechlin to play a role in the film, however, she was replaced by Shriya Pilgaonkar. Vishnu Vishal was signed to play a role in the Tamil and Telugu versions while Pulkit Samrat reprised his role in the Hindi version.

== Release ==
Initially scheduled for release on 2 April 2020, the film release was then indefinitely postponed due to the COVID-19 pandemic, before being rescheduled to be released on 15 January 2021 to coincide with Pongal festival. In January 2021, the film has been announced to release on 26 March 2021.

In March 2021, owing to the COVID-19 situation, the release of Hindi version Haathi Mere Saathi has been postponed. Tamil and Telugu versions, however, are released as scheduled. The Hindi version is set to have a direct-to-video release on the television channel Zee Cinema followed by the streaming platform Eros Now on 18 September 2021.

== Music ==
Kaadan Aranya Haathi Mere Saathi

Soundtrack album by Shantanu Moitra
- Released: 17 March 2021 (All languages)
- Recorded: 2019–20
- Genre: Feature film soundtrack
- Length: 14:23 (Tamil); 14:22 (Telugu); 14:25 (Hindi)
- Languages: Tamil; Telugu; Hindi
- Label: Eros Music
- Producer: Eros International

The music for the film has been composed by Shantanu Moitra and lyrics written by Swanand Kirkire (Hindi version) and Vanamali (Tamil and Telugu versions).

Tamil
No.	Title	Singer(s)	Length
1.	"Thaalaattu Paadum"	Haricharan	4:53
2.	"Chinna China"	Haricharan	4:24
3.	"Idhayame"	Javed Ali	5:06
Total length:			14:23

Telugu
No.	Title	Singer(s)	Length
1.	"Chitike 'Se' Aa Chirugaali"	Haricharan	4:53
2.	"Vellu Vellu"	Haricharan	4:24
3.	"Hrudayame"	Javed Ali	5:06
Total length:			14:22

Hindi
No.	Title	Singer(s)	Length
1.	"Shukriya"	Rituraj Mohanty	4:53
2.	"Dheeme Dheeme"	Adriz Gosh	4:26
3.	"Ae Hawa"	Javed Ali	5:06
Total length:			14:25

== Reception ==
=== Aranya ===
The Times of India critic Suhas Yelupantla rated the film 3.5 stars of 5 and calling it an "engaging ride." He added that, "The first few minutes of the film are among the best. The visual effects, backed by the background score is spot on. The portrayal of the elephants is even better."

Sangeetha Devi Dundoo of The Hindu felt that the film could have been better, and added "Rana singularly tries to hold things together, trying to save the elephants as well as the film." Hemanth Kumar, in his review for the Firstpost, also echoed the same, stating that: "Rana Daggubati's film on ecosystem conservation, is educational but exceptionally insipid." The Indian Express journalist Manoj Kumar rated the film 2/5 and called it "sub-standard." He added that Aranya was redeemed by its cinematography, Resul Pookutty's sound design, and Daggubati's acting."

=== Kaadan ===
A reviewer from Sify called it a "noble attempt." They termed "Rana and his earnest performance as Kaadan" and "AR Ashok Kumar's splendid cinematography" as the film's main highlights. Haricharan Pudipeddi of Hindustan Times opined that the film was predictable and added: "its grandeur merely used as a gimmick to project the film on epic scale." Pudipeddi appreciated Daggubati's performance, calling it "one of his best till date." M. Sugandh in his The Times of India review wrote: "Prabu Solomon is more interested in telling us a story. It is only in the climax that the filmmaker starts to sermonise, which feels unnecessary given that we get the movie's 'message' even without the need for any underscoring."

=== Haathi Mere Saathi ===
NDTV's Saibal Chatterjee rated the film 2/5 and opined that the film rode on Daggubati's shoulders. He added that Solomon delivered the message on increasing deforestation in a gratuitously high-pitched manner, completely devoid of nuance. Writing for the Rediff.com, Sukanya Verma gave a negative review and said: "Between bad writing, hysterical acting and a shoddy blend of CGI and the real deal, Haathi Mere Saathi completely neglects the message of saving our elephants."
