= Manya Surve =

Indian criminal (1944-1982)

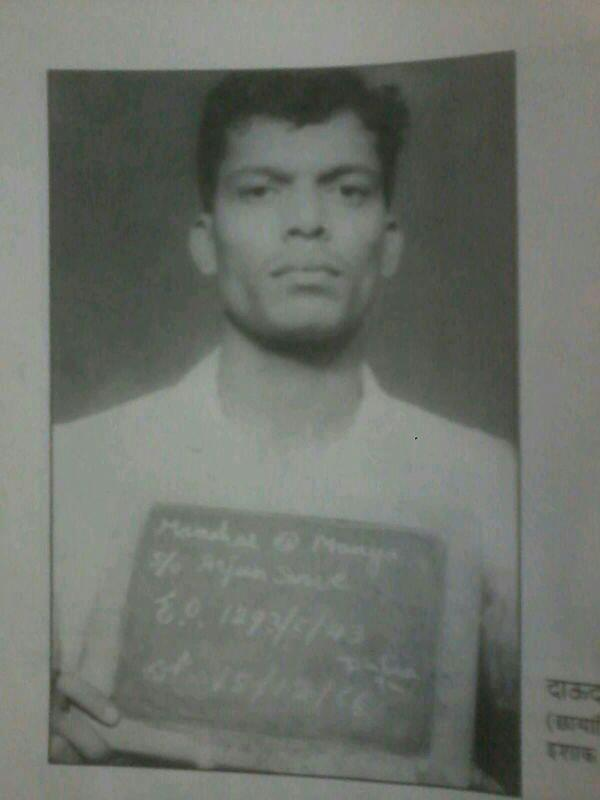
- Born: Manohar Arjun Surve; 8 August 1944; Ranpar, Bombay Presidency, British India (present day Ratnagiri, Maharashtra, India)
- Died: 11 January 1982 (aged 37); Bombay, (present day Mumbai), Maharashtra, India
- Cause of death: Gunshot wounds
- Education: Kirti M. Doongursee College, Mumbai
- Status: Killed in encounter
- Criminal charges: Murder, Looting, Trafficking

Manohar Arjun "Manya" Surve (8 August 1944 – 11 January 1982) was an Indian gangster based in Mumbai. He was one of the educated gangsters who graduated from college and was well known for challenging and defeating existing gangs.

Surve was known for his daredevilry and strategic planning. As a young man and graduate of Kirti College, Surve was implicated in a murder that he did not commit and was sentenced to imprisonment in Yerwada Jail. Within just two years of activity, his crew rose to such prominence that the Pathans, who had ruled the underworld for over two decades, sought his help in murdering the Konkani-speaking Kaskar brothers, Dawood and Shabir, the leaders of their archrival gang, D-Company.

Following the murder of Shabir Ibrahim, Surve's fellow accomplices began to fall off one by one. Noticing this, Surve laid low. Meanwhile, local law enforcement was preparing operations to reduce persistent mob violence with an onslaught of targeted assassinations. Inspectors Isaque Bagwan and Raja Tambhat, with Senior Inspector Y. D. Bhide, was put in charge of taking down Surve. Surve was killed in 1982 by the Maharashtra police in what is regarded as Mumbai's first encounter killing.

== Biography ==
=== Early years ===
Manohar Arjun Surve was born in 1944 in the village of Ranpar in the Konkan Ratnagiri region, located in the Central Deccan Division of the erstwhile Bombay Presidency, British Indian Empire. The village is now a part of Ratnagiri Taluka, Ratnagiri District, Maharashtra, India. Surve moved to Bombay with his mother and stepfather in 1952. For years, he lived in different chawls in Elphinstone Road and Lower Parel. He was a Chemistry graduate from Kirti M. Doongursee College, Mumbai, achieving a high score of 78%. He then fell into street life, eventually forming a crew consisting of former classmates. During these years, he was introduced to his best friend and associate Sumesh Desai through his stepbrother Bhargav Dada. Dada was a feared criminal from Agar Bazar in Dadar. In 1969, Surve, Dada and associate Manya Podhkar were all charged in the homicide and gang assault of a man named Dandekar. The trio were soon arrested by Police Inspector E. S. Dabholkar and sentenced to life imprisonment.

=== Imprisonment and escape ===
While incarcerated at the Yerwada Central Jail in Pune, Surve developed a fierce rivalry with gangster Suhas ("Potya Bhai") Bhatkar. Annoyed by Surve's terror tactics, the prison authorities had him transferred to Ratnagiri jail. There, he took part in a hunger strike and lost almost 20 kg before being transferred to the local civil hospital. Surve utilized this opportunity to escape on 14 November 1979 and returned to the streets of Mumbai, having served over nine years of his sentence.

=== Mumbai underworld ===
After he returned to Mumbai, Surve formed another outfit and recruited his two trusted lieutenants, Sheikh Munir from Dharavi and Vishnu Patil from Dombivli. They were soon joined by another gangster, Uday Shetty, in March 1980.

The group's first robbery took place on 5 April 1980, in which they stole an Ambassador car. The vehicle was later used to loot Rs 5,700 from the Laxmi Trading Company near Currey Road. On 15 April, Surve and his associates brutally assaulted and nearly killed Sheikh Aziz, an enemy of Sheikh Munir, near Kala Killa in the Dharavi slum. On 30 April, they stabbed a police constable when he was escorting rival Vijay Ghadge to a police station in Dadar.

Borrowing the plot from a James Hadley Chase novel, which he had read in prison, Surve decided to loot money from the government milk scheme in a bid to gain money as well as recognition from the Mumbai underworld. The group, with the addition of Dayanand, Parshuram Katkar, and Kishore Sawant, stole a car near Badal Bijlee Barkha in Mahim and went on to execute a heist of Rs 1.26 lakh near Govandi. The stolen vehicle was later found abandoned near National College in Bandra, exactly as penned in the Chase novel.

Another famous robbery undertaken by Surve's group included Rs 1.6 lakh from Canara Bank's branch on Sion-Trombay road and Duke and Sons Company at Deonar. Surve's criminal activities were not confined to heists and robberies. He was also involved in narcotics trafficking, as he saw that the profits derived from it were considerable.

The group's various successful heists and robberies brought a tremendous amount of attention. As a result, the police were put under great pressure to deal with Surve, and they launched Operation Manya Surve to capture and curb his criminal activities.

On 22 June 1981, Sheikh Munir was picked up from a chemical company near Kalyan. A few days later, Dayanand and Parshuram Katkar were arrested at a lodge in Goregoan. Anticipating his capture, Surve slipped into an aide's hideout in Bhiwandi but quickly fled on 19 November 1981. When police finally broke into the apartment, they recovered a hand grenade, a country-made revolver, and live ammunition.

=== Encounter ===
On 11 January 1982, Surve took a taxi to the Ambedkar College junction in Wadala. It is believed Mumbai police received a tip from Dawood Ibrahim that Surve would be arriving at a beauty parlour near the Ambedkar College junction there. It is also theorised that his girlfriend Vidya revealed his whereabouts at that time. At around 1:30 pm, 18 Crime Branch officers split into three teams and waited for him to arrive. After twenty minutes, Surve was spotted exiting a taxi to pick up his girlfriend Vidya.

After noticing several men closing in on him and taking positions, Surve pulled out his Webley & Scott revolver. However, before he could fire a shot, police officers Raja Tambat and Isaque Bagwan fired five bullets into his chest and shoulder.

Surve was dragged from the scene and put in an ambulance. This encounter was the end of Surve's spree of urban crime. This happened due to his involvement in the murder of Dawood's brother Shabbir.

Surve's death became known as Mumbai's first recorded encounter killing. The rate of encounter killings increased in the late 1980s and further rose after the 1993 Mumbai bombings; a total of 622 alleged criminals were killed in police encounters from 1982 to 2004.

== In popular culture ==
The life of Manya Surve inspired and provided the basis for the 1990 gangster film, Agneepath. The film's main character, Vijay Dinanath Chauhan, played by Amitabh Bachchan, was heavily based on Surve. Bachchan's portrayal of Chauhan earned him a National Award for Best Actor. It was remade with the same name, Agneepath, in 2012.

The life of Surve is portrayed in the 2013 Bollywood film Shootout at Wadala, starring John Abraham as Surve.
