= Nandi Award for Best Special Effects =

Indian film award

The Nandi Award for Best Special Effects, instituted in 2005, is presented by the Nandi Awards committee to the film with the best visual effects in a particular year.

The award is usually given to the special effects supervisor or the special effects company that worked for the selected film. Magadheera, Eega, and Baahubali: The Beginning are the films which won both the Nandi Award for Best Special Effects and National Film Award for Best Special Effects for that year.

Year	Name	Film	Ref
2016	Sanath (FireFly Digital)	Soggade Chinni Nayana	
2015	V. Srinivas Mohan	Baahubali: The Beginning	
2014	Raghunath	Legend	
2013	Yathi Raj	Saahasam	
2012	Pete Draper (Makuta VFX)	Eega	
2011	Phani Eggone	Anaganaga O Dheerudu	
2010	Sri Alagar Swamy	Varudu	
2009	R. C. Kamalakannan	Magadheera	
2008	Rahul Nambiar	Arundhati	
2007	R. C. Kamalakannan	Yamadonga	
2006	Spirit Media	Sainikudu	
2005	C. H. Srinivas	Athadu	

== See also ==
- Nandi Awards
