= Isaque Bagwan =

Indian police officer, 1974–2009

Isaque Bagwan is a former Indian police officer. He is widely known for carrying out the first police encounter in Mumbai.

== Life & Background ==
Bagwan joined police force in 1974.

Bagwan became well known through media in 1982 when he was a sub-inspector and he carried out the police encounter of gangster Manya Surve at Wadala, Mumbai. This was the first-ever registered encounter done by the Mumbai Police.

In 1983, gangster Amirzada Khan was shot dead in Mumbai's Sessions Court on the orders of gangster Dawood Ibrahim Kaskar. The assassin David Pardesi attempted to escape but was shot in the leg by Bagwan before he was arrested. During the 2008 Mumbai attacks, Bagwan won accolades for safeguarding people and restricting the movement of militants. He took retirement in 2009.

In 2018, he published his memoir called "Me against the Mumbai Underworld".

== In popular culture ==
He was depicted in the 2013 Bollywood movie Shootout at Wadala. His character was played by Anil Kapoor.
