= Ab Tak Chhappan =

2004 film by Shimit Amin

- Directed by: Shimit Amin
- Written by: Sandeep Shrivastava
- Produced by: Ram Gopal Varma
- Starring: Nana Patekar; Revathi; Yashpal Sharma; Mohan Agashe
- Cinematography: Vishal Sinha
- Edited by: Murad Siddiqui
- Music by: Salim–Sulaiman
- Production company: Varma Corporation
- Distributed by: Sahara Motion Pictures
- Release date: 27 February 2004
- Running time: 130 minutes
- Country: India
- Language: Hindi

Ab Tak Chhappan (transl. Fifty-six so far) is a 2004 Indian Hindi-language crime drama film directed by Shimit Amin. It was written by Sandeep Shrivastava and produced by Ram Gopal Varma. It stars Nana Patekar, Revathi, Yashpal Sharma, Mohan Agashe, Nakul Vaid, and Hrishitaa Bhatt.

The story revolves around Inspector Sadhu Agashe from the Mumbai Encounter Squad famous for having killed 56 people in police encounters. A film without any songs, it is inspired by the life of Mumbai Police Sub-Inspector Daya Nayak. The film premiered at the New York Asian Film Festival. Times Internet released a first-person shooter game titled Fatal Encounter as a tie-in to the film.

The film released theatrically on 27 February 2004 and was a moderate success at the box office. A sequel Ab Tak Chhappan 2 directed by Aejaz Gulab was released in 2015.

== Plot ==
The section of the Mumbai Police Department responsible for handling the underworld, known as Crime Branch, is headed by Sadhu Agashe. Sadhu is the city's best inspector with an enviable reputation and a record of encounter killings. Though challenging, he is a loving husband to his wife and father and also helps his informers and other poor people in times of need. His immediate junior, Imtiyaz Siddiqui, despises Sadhu to no end; he feels Sadhu intentionally belittles him. Also, Imtiyaz is more concerned about adding to his encounter score and therefore ends up killing more than the primary target, which is the main reason Sadhu dislikes him. To add to his woes, Imtiyaz is unable to surpass Sadhu's encounter "score". Enter Jatin, a rookie to this line of policing who manages to impress Sadhu. The inspector takes the newcomer under his wing, further antagonizing Imtiyaz. All of them report to the Commissioner Pradhan who is a fair and honest police officer.

During these events, Sadhu establishes a love-hate friendship on the phone with Zameer (Prasad Purandare), a notorious underworld don based abroad, who grudgingly admires Sadhu for his no-nonsense attitude. Zameer and rival don, Rajashekhar, run the Mumbai underworld.

Sadhu Agashe's world begins to turn upside down as Pradhan retires and with the entrance of the new commissioner, M P Suchak who has a strong link with the don, Rajashekhar. Suchak takes a liking towards Imtiyaz, who is willing to do encounters primarily with Zameer's men, mainly on Rajashekhar's orders. Suchak starts undermining and belittling Sadhu. Sadhu continues on his righteous path. Eventually, the pressures of his career take a toll on his personal life as some men kill his wife in Jatin and Vaishali's wedding reception party. During his personal investigation into this matter, Sadhu kills Feroz, the right-hand man of Rajashekhar. Sadhu is compelled to resign from the force, and Suchak (on Rajashekhar's orders) sends Imtiyaz to kill Sadhu. Imtiaz gets killed in a peculiar chain of events, and Sadhu Agashe, a once famed inspector, becomes a fugitive of the law. Suchak announces shoot at sight orders against Sadhu despite Pradhan's advice to the contrary, and Sadhu is forced to ask Zameer for help in escaping from India.

Meanwhile, Jatin, who has been growing increasingly disenchanted by Suchak's behaviour, resigns and calls for a press conference and exposes Suchak's connection with Rajashekhar. Suchak disputes this in his press conference but is suspended pending the investigation.

Sadhu goes to Zameer's HQ and thanks to him for releasing him and tells him that he is now Zameer's man. As Zameer and Sadhu are drinking alone, Sadhu breaks a glass. Sadhu accuses Zameer of killing his wife. When Zameer tells Sadhu that it is Feroz who killed his wife, Sadhu informs him that he had killed Feroz earlier, and hence he was convinced that using Feroz's name, Zameer had murdered Sadhu's wife. Suddenly, Sadhu uses the broken glass to kill Zameer and escapes. Then the scene rolls forward to a location abroad where Sadhu and Pradhan are having coffee. When Pradhan asks Sadhu about why he had run away, thereby proving the allegations against him, Sadhu tells him that it is part of his plan. He was able to kill Zameer as a fugitive which he could never have done as a cop. He says that he will now go to Rajashekhar since Rajashekhar is thrilled at Zameer's death and kill him too. Sadhu says that he doesn't care what the world thinks of him, and he will always be a cop and will continue his work of eliminating crime until he dies. He requests Pradhan to look after his son, who is with his maternal aunt in Pune, and Pradhan contemplatively agrees. The end credits roll as Sadhu gets up and walks off after saying good bye to Pradhan.

== Cast ==
- Nana Patekar as Inspector Sadhu Agashe (based on Daya Nayak)
- Yashpal Sharma as Sub-Inspector Imtiaz Siddiqui
- Prasad Purandare as Zameer, underworld don
- Nakul Vaid as Sub-Inspector Jatin Shukla
- Kunal Vijaykar as Sub-Inspector Francis Alvarez
- Jeeva as Joint Commissioner M P Suchak
- Revathi as Nameeta Agashe, Sadhu Agashe's wife
- Tanmay Jahagirdar as Aman Agashe, Sadhu Agashe's son
- Ravi Kale as Corporator Velankar
- Hrishitaa Bhatt as Vaishali, Jatin's wife (Special appearance)
- Parvez Fazal Khan as Feroz
- Dr. Mohan Agashe as Ex-Commissioner Pradhan
- Pravin Patil as Sub-Inspector Narayan
- Dibyendu Bhattacharya as Nazrul, Zameer's henchman
- Anant Jog as Sawant
- Shaikh Shami Usman as Joshi
- Ajay Rohilla as Vinod, Police informer
- Pankaj Saraswat as Pappu, Police informer
- Megan Cocks as Melinda, Zameer's moll
- Dinesh Lamba as Rafiq
- Amrish as Vilas
- Vijay as Rasool
- Ashok Kumar Beniwal as RAW Officer
- Adil Rana as a Police officer
- Amin Merchant as Wadia
- Santosh Tiwari as a servant

== Reception ==
Ab Tak Chappan received positive reviews from critics. Anil George of Rediff said this one inches to 4 stars out of 5 and wrote that this was a Nana special, praised the story, direction of Shimit, the acting of the cast, cinematography and music, but also pointed out that film was jarringly edited by Shimit and lacked a consistent thread. Archana Vohra of NDTV stated, "Designed to jar and jolt, this morbid cop land tale may be low-key but certainly isn't a film that one can dismiss easily. Nana Patekar proves yet again that he is undoubtedly one of the finest actors in the country while the rest of the cast too slips into character easily." Smitha Parigi of Mid-Day wrote that "Though the film is well crafted, it seems contrived because the ends tie up too easily." She was, however, particularly appreciative of Patekar's performance as Agashe, noting it to be "a refreshing change from his usual shaking, frothing self."

== Awards ==
=== BFJA Awards ===
- Best Actor – Nana Patekar

=== Zee Cine Awards ===
- Best Background Score – Salim and Sulaiman Merchant – Won
- Best Publicity Design – Leo Entertainment – Won
- Best Producer – Ram Gopal Varma – Nominated
