= Shootout at Wadala =

2013 Indian film by Sanjay Gupta

- Theatrical release poster
- Directed by: Sanjay Gupta
- Screenplay by: Sanjay Bhatia; Abhijeet Deshpande; Sanjay Gupta
- Dialogues by: Milap Zaveri
- Story by: Sanjay Gupta; Hussain Zaidi
- Based on: Dongri to Dubai' by Hussain Zaidi
- Produced by: Sanjay Gupta; Anuradha Gupta; Ekta Kapoor; Shobha Kapoor
- Starring: Anil Kapoor; John Abraham; Manoj Bajpayee; Kangana Ranaut; Tusshar Kapoor; Sonu Sood
- Cinematography: Sameer Arya; Sanjay F. Gupta
- Edited by: Bunty Nagi
- Music by: Songs: Anu Malik; Mustafa Zahid; Anand Raj Anand; Meet Bros; Score: Amar Mohile
- Production companies: Balaji Motion Pictures; White Feather Films
- Distributed by: Balaji Motion Pictures through Raksha Entertainment
- Release date: 1 May 2013 (India)
- Running time: 150 minutes
- Country: India
- Language: Hindi
- Budget: ₹49 crore
- Box office: ₹82 crore

Shootout at Wadala is a 2013 Indian Hindi-language crime action film written and directed by Sanjay Gupta. The film stars Anil Kapoor, Ronit Roy, John Abraham, Tusshar Kapoor, Manoj Bajpayee, Kangana Ranaut and Sonu Sood and Mahesh Manjrekar. It is a prequel to the 2007 film Shootout at Lokhandwala. In the film, Manya, a diligent student, lands in prison for killing a gangster who attacked his brother, Bhargav, who eventually dies. Soon, Manya escapes jail and forms his own gang to seek revenge.

Based on the book Dongri to Dubai: Six Decades of the Mumbai Mafia by Hussain Zaidi, the film dramatises the encounter by Bombay police in which gangster Manya Surve was shot dead. It took place at the junction adjacent to Dr. Ambedkar College, Wadala, Bombay on 11 January 1982.

Shootout at Wadala was released on 1 May 2013 and received mixed reviews from critics, It grossed over ₹82 crore (US$8.8 million) against a budget of ₹49 crore (US$5.2 million).

== Plot ==
In a police van, Assistant Commissioner of Police (ACP) Afaque Baghran listens to the life story of Manohar "Manya" Surve, a notorious gangster lying mortally wounded from multiple gunshot wounds following a police encounter, while also telling his career trajectory parallel to Manya's Story.

In the 1970s, Manya is an honest, high-achieving college student at Kirti College in Dadar, Mumbai. He is deeply in love with his classmate Vidya Joshi and intends to marry her after introducing her to his mother. However, his life unravels due to his elder brother, Bhargav Surve, a local thug embroiled in a conflict with an underworld boss named Bhatkar. When Bhatkar's men ambush Bhargav, Manya intervenes to defend him. In the ensuing struggle, Manya restrains one of the attackers, whom Bhargav stabs to death on the spot. On the day of Manya's graduation exam results, Inspector Ambolkar arrests both brothers and publicly humiliates Manya in front of his college.

Both brothers are sentenced and sent to Yerwada Central Jail in Pune. Inside, a ruthless inmate named Potya attacks Bhargav during lunch, but fellow convict Sheikh Munir intervenes and saves Manya. In the melee, Bhargav is killed. Grieving and embittered, Manya forms an alliance with Munir and a powerhouse convict named Veera, who trains him in physical combat. When Potya eventually challenges Manya, a brutal brawl ensues, culminating in Manya stabbing Potya to death. Sometime later, Manya and Munir stage a daring escape while deployed on railway track labor.

In 1978, Mumbai was dominated by the gang of Haji Maqsood. On 22nd June 1978, in Chawla Guest House, a couple who arrived for Honeymoon in Mumbai were brutally assaulted by Yakub and Batla, local goons, who killed the husband and sexually assaulted the wife. Sadiq, an unscrupulous journalist arrives at the scene, taunting the Police, later advising them to use the Haksar Brothers—Zubair and Dilawar— to counter the Maqsood gang, while publishing the details of Yakub and Batla in the newspaper. Afaaque with Inspectors Yashwanth Bhinde and Raja Tambat go to Donghri and arrest Yakub. Batla then retaliates by putting a bomb in the lunch of Afaaque's Son, who gets arrested by Afaaque after a brutal thrashing. Tensions spark after Yakub and Batla murder Sadiq, enraging the Haksars, who considered Sadiq as a father figure. The brothers kill Yakub and Decapitate Batla by Chopping off his hands as he pleads guilty of the Guest House Incident and Murder of Yakub. The police know the Haksar brothers are behind it but remain silent due to lack of evidence.

After returning to Bombay, Manya and Munir attempt to align with Zubair and Dilawar who now dominate the city's underworld. While Zubair is intrigued, Dilawar rejects and insults Manya. Refusing to serve under anyone, Manya decides to build his own syndicate. Along with Munir and Veera, he enlists Gyancho, a sharpshooter, and launches a string of daring robberies and targeted killings. The gang murders Bhatkar (who was also behind the murder of Bhargav in Jail) and absorbs his bodyguard, Jamal. Manya also tracks down Inspector Ambolkar, brutally thrashing him in public to avenge his past humiliation.

Meanwhile, Manya crosses paths with Vidya, who was widowed after two years of marriage. Although she initially welcomes him back into her life after they both make love, she demands he leave upon discovering he is an convict who lives a criminal life. The relationship grows increasingly volatile as Manya continues to force his way into her life.

To avoid escalating an all-out turf war between the Haksars and the rival gang of Haji Maqsood, Maqsood calls for a truce, but Aurangzeb and Mirzada, secretly hire Manya to eliminate Zubair. Manya, along with his gang, successfully ambushes and assassinates Zubair, enraging Dilawar. That same night, Manya goes to Vidya's place, violently having sex with her. Seeking retribution, Dilawar uses Jamal to set up and murder Gyancho, and later tries to kill Munir before Manya rescues him. Manya decides to kill Dilawar but Munir stops him, asking him to wait for Dilawar to make a mistake. Manya agrees but affirms he won't wait long.

Sometime later, The Police Commissioner gives Afaaque a choice to conduct an encounter against either Dilawar Haksar or Manya Surve, leading Afaaque to choose Manya, as he is an escaped convict. Realizing that a direct assault could lead to casualties, Afaaque approaches Vidya. He manipulates her into believing that the police will spare Manya's life if she helps them capture him peacefully. As Manya seeks to leave Bombay, he contacts Vidya, who gives up Manya's location.

When Manya arrives at the rendezvous point, the Wadala college, expecting to meet Vidya, Afaaque and his squad ambush him and open fire in a staged encounter. As the police van arrives and Manya succumbs to his fatal bullet wounds, Vidya watches in utter shock, realizing she was misled into facilitating his death. Afaaque confirms Manya's demise, ending the life of the notorious gangster.

== Cast ==
- Anil Kapoor as ACP Afaque Baghran IPS (based on Isaque Bagwan)
- John Abraham as Manya Surve
- Tusshar Kapoor as Sheikh Muhammad Yunus Munir
- Manoj Bajpayee as Zubair Imitaz Haskar (based on Shabir Ibrahim Kaskar)
- Sonu Sood as Dilawar Imtiaz Haksar (based on Dawood Ibrahim)
- Ronit Roy as Inspector Raja Ambat (based on Inspector Raja Tambat)
- Mahesh Manjrekar as Inspector Yashwanth Bhinde (based on Inspector Madhukar Shinde)
- Raju Mavani as Yakub Lala (based on Ayub Lala)
- Arif Zakaria as Sadiq (news reporter) (based on Iqbal Naatiq)
- Kangana Ranaut as Vidya Joshi
- Soni Razdan as Manya's mother
- Pankaj Kalra as Saeed Batla
- Karan Patel as Jamal (Bhatkar's bodyguard) (fictional)
- Vineet Sharma as Bhargav Surve
- Raju Kher as Inspector Ambolkar (based on Inspector E. S. Dabholkar)
- Akbar Khan as Haji Maqsood (based on Haji Mastan) (cameo)
- Siddhanth Kapoor as Gyancho (based on Vishnu Patil)
- Ranjeet as Bhatkar Dada
- Chetan Hansraj as Potya (based on Suhas Bhatkar)
- Sanjeev Chadda as Veera (based on Uday Shetty)
- Shaji Chaudhary as Aurangzeb Mastan

Cameo appearances

- Jackie Shroff as Police Commissioner (uncredited)
- Sunny Leone as Laila in the item number "Laila" (role inspired from Zubair's girlfriend Chitra)
- Priyanka Chopra in the item number "Babli Badmaash" (uncredited)
- Sophie Choudry in the item number "Aala Re Aala"

== Controversy ==
During production, director Sanjay Gupta retained references to underworld figures despite concerns over potential legal and security implications. In early promotional material, Sonu Sood's character was identified as "Dilawar Imtiaz", a character reportedly based on Dawood Ibrahim. However, on 27 January 2013, Balaji Motion Pictures released a revised theatrical trailer in which most character-identifying dialogue was removed. The appearance of the character based on Dawood Ibrahim was also significantly reduced, and several character names were changed in the promotional material, although John Abraham's character name remained unchanged in the film.

== Soundtrack ==
Shootout at Wadala

Soundtrack album by Anu Malik, Meet Bros Anjjan, Mustafa Zahid and Anand Raaj Anand
- Released: 19 March 2013
- Recorded: 2013
- Genre: Feature film soundtrack
- Length: 49:26
- Language: Hindi
- Label: Sony Music India

Anu Malik chronology
Yeh Jo Mohabbat Hai (2012)	Shootout at Wadala (2013)

Meet Bros Anjjan chronology
OMG – Oh My God! (2012)	Shootout at Wadala (2013)	Policegiri (2013)

Mustafa Zahid chronology
Murder 3 (2013)	Shootout at Wadala (2013)	Aashiqui 2 (2013)

Anand Raaj Anand chronology
Deewana Main Deewana (2013)	Shootout at Wadala (2013)	Zanjeer (2013)

Singles from Shootout at Wadala
- 1. "Babli Badmaash" Released: 14 March 2013; 2. "Aala Re Aala" Released: 24 April 2013; 3. "Laila" Released: 28 April 2013; 4. "Aye Manya" Released: 7 May 2013

The music of the film is composed by Anu Malik, Anand Raaj Anand, Meet Bros Anjjan and Mustafa Zahid.

=== Track listing ===
No.	Title	Lyrics	Music	Artist(s)	Length
1.	"Aala Re Aala"	Neelesh Misra	Anu Malik	Sunidhi Chauhan, Mika Singh	5:44
2.	"Laila"	Sanjay Gupta	Anand Raaj Anand	Mika Singh & Anand Raaj Anand	3:36
3.	"Babli Badmaash"	Kumaar	Anu Malik	Sunidhi Chauhan	4:27
4.	"Ek Din Ke Liye"		Anu Malik	Sunidhi Chauhan & Anu Malik	0:48
5.	"Yeh Junoon"		Mustafa Zahid	Mustafa Zahid	4:52
6.	"Aye Manya"		Meet Bros Anjjan	Adnan Sami, Meet Bros Anjjan & Shaan	4:56
7.	"Goli"		Meet Bros Anjjan	Meet Bros Anjjan, Sudesh Bhosle, Anil Kapoor & John Abraham	4:08
8.	"Babli Badmaash (Remix by Gourav Das Gupta & Roshan Balu)"		Anu Malik	Sunidhi Chauhan & Anu Malik	4:47
9.	"Aala Re Aala (Remix by Gourav Das Gupta & Roshan Balu)"		Anu Malik	Sunidhi Chauhan, Mika Singh & Anu Malik	5:02
10.	"Laila (Remix by Gourav Das Gupta & Roshan Balu)"		Anand Raaj Anand	Mika Singh & Anand Raj Anand	3:27
11.	"Yeh Junoon (Remix by Mayur Sahani)"		Mustafa Zahid	Mustafa Zahid	4:01
12.	"Goli (Remix by Mayur Sahani)"		Meet Bros Anjjan	Meet Bros Anjjan, Sudesh Bhosle, Anil Kapoor, John Abraham	3:38
Total length:					49:26

== Reception ==
The film received a mixed reception from critics.

The ratings for the film provided by the reviewers have been tabulated. Below the table lies a collection of excerpts from the reviews, which can be matched to the respective rating as given in the table by seeing the source.

Review scores
Source	Rating
Bollywood Hungama	Star
Times of India	4/5 stars
Zee News	3.5/5 stars
DNA India	3/5 stars
NDTV	2.5/5 stars
Yahoo	2.5/5 stars
IBN	2/5 stars
The Indian Express	2/5 stars
Rediff	2/5 stars

== Box office ==
=== India ===
Shootout at Wadala had an opening of around 65% occupancy and went on to collect ₹101.9 million (US$1.1 million) on first day. The two-week domestic distributor share is ₹ 255.0 million approx. The final total came out to be ₹820 million (US$8.8 million).

=== Overseas ===
Shootout at Wadala collected $900,000 over its first weekend. Its final overseas collection was US$1.625 million.

=== Budget and marketing ===
Shootout at Wadala was made with a budget of ₹50 crore (US$5.3 million) of production costs. The prints and marketing budget was ₹15 crore (US$1.6 million).

== Future ==
Director Sanjay Gupta has stated his plans to make the third installment to the franchise, Shootout at Byculla based on the JJ Hospital shootout in 1992 by Dawood Ibrahim's D Company against the Arun Gawli gang for the latter's killing of Ibrahim's brother-in-law Ismail Parkar (the husband of Haseena Parkar). He has also said that he will restart his movie Alibaug, starring Sunny Deol, Govinda Ahuja, Emraan Hashmi and turn it into the third sequel of the Shootout film series. Also, actors Abhishek Bachchan, Shabir Ahluwalia and John Abraham have been rumoured to star alongside each other. Abraham will portray a real encounter specialist Vijay Salaskar. The project is currently untitled, but it has been reported to be an "epic revenge saga".
