= Prakash Kovelamudi =

Indian film director, screenwriter, and actor

- Born: Kovelamudi Prakash Rao; 25 June 1975 (age 50); Hyderabad, Andhra Pradesh, India (now in Telangana, India)
- Occupation: Film director
- Spouse: Kanika Dhillon (m. 2014; div. 2017)
- Relatives: K. S. Prakash Rao (grandfather); K. Raghavendra Rao (father); Shobu Yarlagadda (Brother-in-law)

Prakash Rao Kovelamudi is an Indian film director, screenwriter, and actor known for his works in alternative cinema, across various languages. He is known for works such as Morning Raga (2004), with which he made his Bollywood acting debut. He then directed Bommalata (2004), which received Best Film in Telugu at the 53rd National Film Awards, the fantasy film, Anaganaga O Dheerudu (2011), and the black comedy, Judgementall Hai Kya (2019). An alumnus of the Lee Strasberg Theatre and Film Institute, Prakash is the son of veteran director K. Raghavendra Rao and grandson of K. S. Prakash Rao.

== Film career ==
Prakash made his acting debut with the Telugu-language movie Neetho. He was set to act in a fantasy film directed by Rajamouli but the film was later shelved. He also appeared in Morning Raga. The films under his directorial belt include Bommalata (A belly full of dreams) and the Telugu fantasy film Anaganaga O Dheerudu, distributed by Walt Disney Studios Motion Pictures. He also directed the film Size Zero, which is also known as Inji Iduppazhagi, starring Arya and Anushka Shetty. His most recent film is Judgemental Hai Kya, a black comedy which addresses mental health issues.

== Personal life ==
Prakash married Kanika Dhillon in 2014 and the couple divorced in 2017.

== Filmography ==
Acting roles
| Year | Title | Role | Language | Notes | Ref. |
|---|---|---|---|---|---|
| 2002 | Neetho | Madhav | Telugu | credited as Surya Prakash | |
| 2004 | Morning Raga | Abhinay | English | | |

Film
| Year | Title | Director | Writer | Producer | Language | Notes | Ref. |
|---|---|---|---|---|---|---|---|
| 2004 | Bommalata | Yes | Yes | No | Telugu | | |
| 2011 | Once Upon a Warrior | Yes | Yes | Yes | Telugu | | |
| 2015 | Size Zero | Yes | No | No | Telugu | Bilingual film | |
| 2015 | Inji Iduppazhagi | Yes | No | No | Tamil | Bilingual film | |
| 2019 | Judgementall Hai Kya | Yes | No | No | Hindi | | |

== Awards ==
- National Film Award for Best Feature Film in Telugu - Bommalata - 2006
