= Bommalata =

Bommalata - A belly full of dreams
- Directed by: Prakash Kovelamudi
- Screenplay by: Prakash Kovelamudi
- Story by: J. K. Bharavi; Prakash Kovelamudi; M/ Krishnamacharya
- Produced by: K. Raghavendra Rao; Rana Daggubati
- Starring: Master Sai Kumar
- Cinematography: Kiran Reddy
- Edited by: A. Sreekar Prasad
- Music by: R. P. Patnaik
- Production companies: R. K. Film Associates; Spirit Media
- Release date: 2004
- Country: India
- Language: Telugu

Bommalata (transl. Puppet show), also known as A Belly Full of Dreams, is a 2004 Indian Telugu-language children's film written and directed by Prakash Kovelamudi. It is produced by K. Raghavendra Rao and Rana Daggubati under R. K. Film Associates and Spirit Media. The film's Puppetry work was done by Dadi Pudumjee, along with art direction by Bhupesh R Bhupathi. The film won the Best Film in Telugu at the 53rd National Awards. Sai Kumar won the National Film Award for Best Child Artist for the film.

== Cast ==
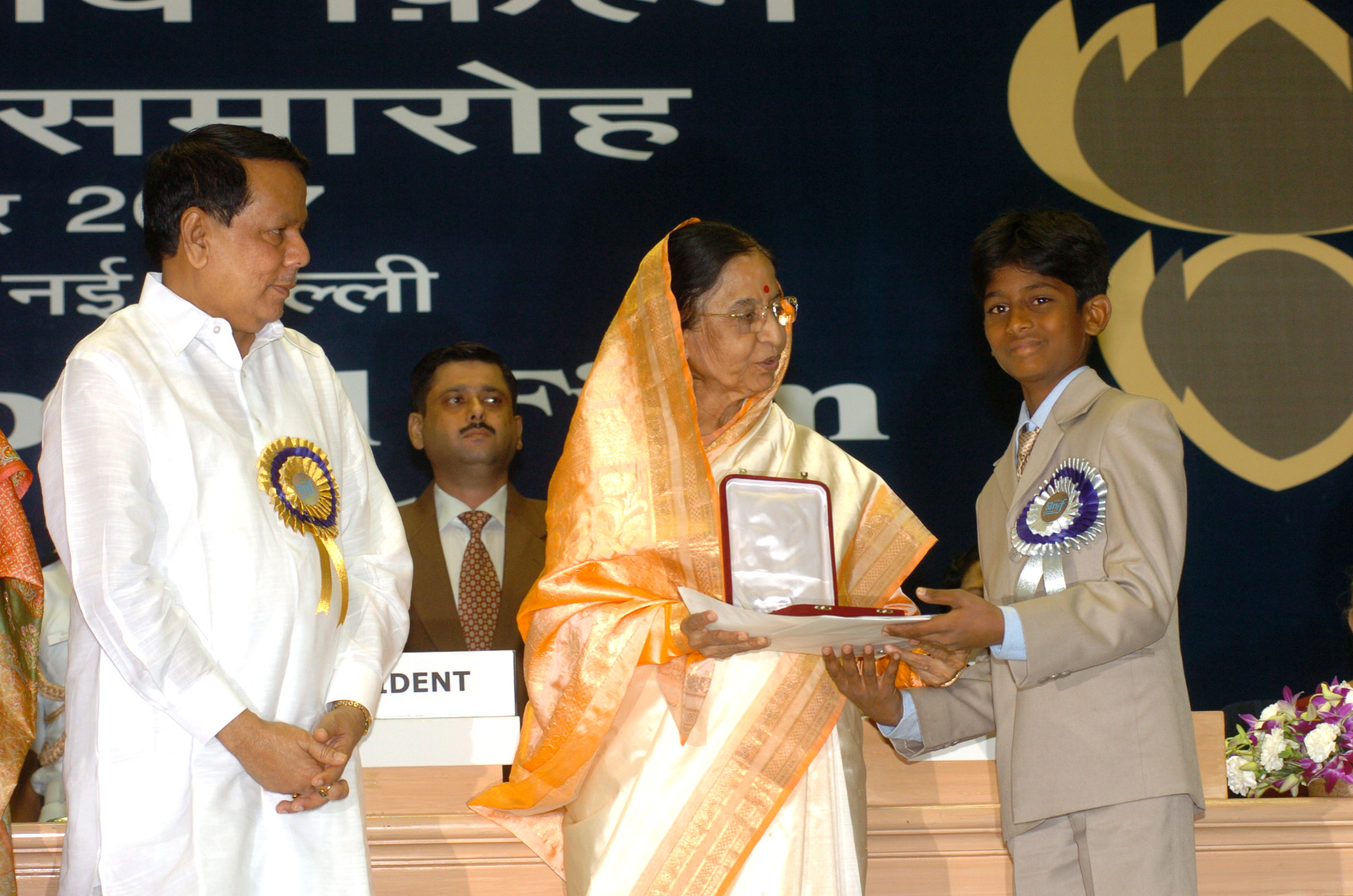
Master Sai Kumar receiving the Best Child Artist Award from the President Pratibha Devisingh Patil.

- Sai Kumar ... Child Artiste
- Shiva... Child Artiste
- Tanikella Bharani ... Tea Stall Owner
- Viren Thambidorai... Tea Stall Customer
- Shriya Saran ... Guest Appearance
- Allari Naresh ... Guest Appearance

== Plot ==
The film follows Ramu, a nine year old boy who dreams of attending school. The character (acted by Sai Kumar) is often described by audiences as heart-touching. Throughout the film, he faces many challenges that demonstrate his character. The story includes Ramu’s emotions towards his first friendship, the desperation he has to study, and his qualities of bravery and honesty.

== Awards ==
- National Film Award for Best Feature Film in Telugu
- National Film Award for Best Child Artist 2005 - Sai Kumar
