= Shimit Amin =

Indian film director and editor

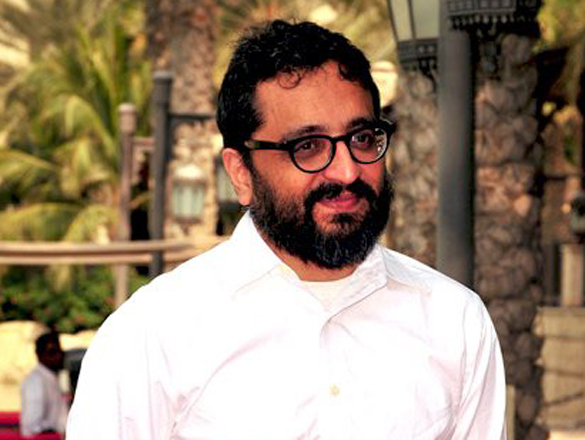
- Born: 1975 (age 50–51); Kampala, Uganda
- Occupations: Director; film editor; producer
- Years active: 1994–present
- Spouse: Megha Ramaswamy

Shimit Amin (born 1975) is an Indian film director and editor. He is best known for directing Chak De! India (2007) starring Shah Rukh Khan.

== Biography ==
Amin was born in Kampala, Uganda but grew up in Florida, United States. While he was enamored with film culture from an early age, his parents pressed him to be more conventional in his college studies; he graduated with a degree in mathematics from the University of Florida. After playing a significant role in organizing and promoting North Florida's first international film festival, The 1991 Asian/Asian American International Film Festival, in Jacksonville, Florida, Amin moved to Miami and primarily worked on industrial/corporate and small independent film projects. After about a year in Miami, Amin moved to California where he worked on independent films before beginning to work, in many behind the camera roles with major Hollywood directors. his energy, film knowledge, and high quality work attracted the attention of Bollywood filmmakers. From Los Angeles, he moved on to working in the Indian film industry.

Amin received an editing position on the Hindi film Bhoot (2003) through a friend while still living in L.A. It was during this time that he became involved in Ab Tak Chhappan (2004), which was a box-office success. His next film Chak De! India, starring Shah Rukh Khan, was a critical and commercial success. His third film Rocket Singh: Salesman of the Year starring Ranbir Kapoor, reunited him with Jaideep Sahni, the writer of Chak De!.

== Filmography ==
=== As director ===
Year	Title	Notes
2004	Ab Tak Chhappan	
2007	Chak De! India	
2009	Rocket Singh: Salesman of the Year	
2020	A Suitable Boy	Television series; Episode 4
2027	Captain India †	

=== Other crew positions ===
Year	Title	Role
2003	Bhoot	Editor
2012	The Reluctant Fundamentalist	Editor
2013	Shuddh Desi Romance	Script Consultant
2014	Words with Gods	Editor

== Awards ==
=== Won ===
==== National Film Awards ====
- 2008 - National Film Award for Best Popular Film Providing Wholesome Entertainment for Chak De India

==== Filmfare Awards ====
- 2008 - Best Film (Critics) for Chak De India

==== IIFA Awards ====
- 2008 - Best Director for Chak De India

==== Apsara Awards ====
- 2008 - Best Director for Chak De India

==== Stardust Awards ====
- 2008 - Best Director (Editor's Choice) for Chak De India

==== Other Awards ====
- 2007 - CNN-IBN Indian of the Year (Entertainment) for Chak De India
- 2008 - V.Shantaram Award for Best Director for Chak De India

== See also ==
- Ugandan Americans
