= No. 1 Yaari =

- Show poster
- Genre: Talk show
- Directed by: Sanjeev Kumar
- Creative director: Sanjeev k kumar
- Presented by: Rana Daggubati (Telugu)
- Country of origin: India
- Original languages: Telugu; Marathi; Kannada; Hindi
- No. of seasons: 3 (Telugu)
- No. of episodes: 38 (Telugu)

Production
- Production locations: Hyderabad, India
- Camera setup: Multi-camera

Original release
- Network: Aha; Viu App; Star Bharat; Gemini TV

No. 1 Yaari (transl. No.1 friendship) was an Indian talk show produced by Viu (season –1, 2) and Aha (season–3) in Telugu (as No.1 Yaari with Rana), Hindi (as No. 1 Yaari Jam), Marathi (as No. 1 Yaari with Swapnil) and Kannada. It is sponsored by McDowell's No.1. The show is designed and directed by Sanjeev k.kumar.

In December 2017, Mame Khan collaborated with music composer duo Salim–Sulaiman to create the intro song.

== Season overview ==
Versions	Host name(s)	Seasons	Episodes	Year(s)	Ref.(s)
Telugu	Rana Daggubati	1	15	2017	
Telugu	Rana Daggubati	2	13	2018	
Telugu	Rana Daggubati	3	10	2021	
Hindi	Salim Merchant, Anushka Manchanda	1	10	2018–19	
Hindi	Salim Merchant, Anushka Manchanda	2		2019–20	
Kannada	Shiva Rajkumar	1	13	2018	
Marathi	Swwapnil Joshi	1	13	2018	
