= Department (film) =

- Theatrical release poster
- Directed by: Ram Gopal Varma
- Written by: Nilesh Girkar
- Produced by: Siddhant Uberoi; Amit Sharma
- Starring: Amitabh Bachchan; Sanjay Dutt; Rana Daggubati; Vijay Raaz; Abhimanyu Singh
- Cinematography: FXS Team
- Edited by: Abhijit Kokate; Vinay Chauhan
- Music by: Bappa Lahiri; Dharam-Sandeep; Vikram Magi
- Production company: Uberoi Line Productions
- Distributed by: Viacom18 Motion Pictures; Wave Cinemas Ponty Chadha
- Release date: 18 May 2012
- Running time: 141 minutes
- Country: India
- Language: Hindi
- Budget: ₹32 crore
- Box office: ₹19.05 crore

Department is a 2012 Indian Hindi-language action drama film directed by Ram Gopal Varma. The film stars Amitabh Bachchan, Sanjay Dutt and Rana Daggubati in lead roles. Released on 18 May 2012, the film received negative reviews from critics.

== Plot ==
Inspector Mahadev Bhosale (Dutt) is tasked by his superiors to form a hit squad called the "Department" to tackle the growing threat of organized crime in Mumbai. He recruits Shiv Narayan (Daggubati), a suspended police officer who had been penalized for an encounter killing. Together, Mahadev and Shiv, along with other members of the team, target crime syndicate leader Sawatya (Raaz) and his gang. Despite numerous urgings from his second-in-command D.K. (Singh) and D.K.'s girlfriend Naseer (Shalini), Sawatya refuses to retaliate against the police action.

Sarjerao Gaikwad (Bachchan) is a former gangster-turned-politician. Shiv and Sarjerao develop a close relationship when the latter saves Shiv’s life at a public rally. However, Mahadev warns Shiv that Sarjerao is manipulating him for his own political gains. As events unfold, it is revealed that Mahadev himself is working for Mohammad Ghouri, an underworld don, and is systematically eliminating Sawatya’s gang at Ghouri’s request. Shiv, unwilling to be part of Mahadev’s corrupt world, chooses to walk away. Despite Mahadev’s agreement to let him go, tensions rise when Shiv confronts a faction formed by D.K. under Mahadev’s protection, leading to a rift between the mentor and his apprentice.

== Cast ==
- Amitabh Bachchan as Sarjerao Gaikwad, a gangster-turned-politician
- Sanjay Dutt as Inspector Mahadev Bhosle, the DSP of an encounter squad
- Rana Daggubati as Inspector Shivnarayan, an encounter specialist
- Vijay Raaz as Sawatya, a crime boss
- Abhimanyu Singh as DK, Sawatya's right-hand man
- Deepak Tijori as Inspector Danaji, an honest member of the department
- Lakshmi Manchu as Satya Bhosle, Mahadev's wife
- Anjana Sukhani as Bharati, Shivnarayan's wife
- Madhu Shalini as Naseer, DK's gun-loving girlfriend
- Neeraj Vora in a dual role as Lalchand and Valchand
- Nathalia Kaur as item number "Dan Dan"

== Soundtrack ==
Department

Soundtrack album by Bappa Lahiri Dharam-Sandeep Vikram Magi
- Released: 9 April 2012
- Genre: Feature film soundtrack
- Label: T-Series

The soundtrack is composed by Bappa Lahiri along with Dharam-Sandeep and Vikram Magi.

No.	Title	Singer(s)	Length
1.	"Dan Dan Cheeni Shoot Mix"	Paroma P.Dasgupta, Ravi, Sandeep Patil	4:05
2.	"Kammo"	Mika Singh, Sudesh Bhosle	5:18
3.	"Theme of Department – Ek Do Teen Chaar"	Sandeep Patil	4:11
4.	"Bad Boys"	Ritu Pathak, Earl	4:05
5.	"Mumbai Police"	Sanjay Dutt, Farhad Bhiwandiwala	4:35

== Reception ==
Srijana Mitra Das of The Times of India rated the film 2/5 stars and wrote, "Losing the plot and three strong stars, Department shoots itself in the foot".

== Box office ==
Department worldwide collections breakdown
Territory	Territory wise Collections break-up
India	Net Gross: ₹118.900 million (US$1.3 million)
India	Distributor share: ₹60.050 million (US$640,000)
India	Total Gross: ₹215.149 million (US$2.3 million)
Worldwide	₹215.149 million (US$2.3 million)
Budget	₹320 million (US$3.4 million)
