= Rajnish Rai =

Police officer in India

- Occupations: police officer, professor
- Known for: investigation of death of Sohrabuddin Sheikh

Rajnish Rai was a Deputy inspector general of police for the Indian Police Service. He began service after graduating with the 1992 cadre. In 2019 he joined the Indian Institute of Management Ahmedabad as an assistant professor.

Rai is known for arresting fellow police officers D G Vanzara, R K Pandian, and Dinesh M N in connection with the 2005 death of Sohrabuddin Sheikh. These early claims put Rai in conflict with Prime Minister Narendra Modi's government. Later Rai would have conflicts with the government, including for his claims of corruption in the Jaduguda uranium mine, army killings of members of the National Democratic Front of Boroland, for accusing the government of harassing him, and for seeking early retirement from government service.

== Investigation of death of Sohrabuddin Sheikh ==
Rai took orders from the Supreme Court of India to probe the 2005 death of Sohrabuddin Sheikh. On 27 April 2007 his investigation led to him arresting three Indian Police Service officers, D G Vanzara, R K Pandian, and Dinesh M N. When he made these arrests he did so without the permission of Gujarat home minister Amit Shah. Following the arrests the state took Rai off the case and returned it to Geetha Johri, who had originally investigated it.

The supposed motivations for the BJP to support the police officers involved in the killings was that these police were Gujarati in the home state of high ranking politicians, and that the killed people were said to be terrorists, and the party's image benefited from eliminating terrorism. The three officers whom Rai arrested were said to be close to politician Amit Shah and also involved in the death of Sohrabuddin Sheikh, the Ishrat Jahan case, and the Tulsiram Prajapati killing. In arresting these police officers Rai came into conflict with Prime Minister Narendra Modi's BJP government.

Before Tulsiram was killed, Rai reported his statement that he feared that police would kill him in a fake encounter.

== Claim of corruption in uranium mining ==
In April 2015 the government gave Rai a new posting to the Central Reserve Police Force. In this role he was to move to Jadugora, a remote location where the Uranium Corporation of India operates the Jaduguda uranium mine. Rai complained of the remoteness of the transfer, saying that it would separate him from his family. Rai also claimed that this posting was a government punishment due to his role in arresting other police officers in the death of Sohrabuddin Sheikh.

His role in this post was as chief vigilance officer in accord with Central Vigilance Commission guidelines. In this role Rai made claims of massive corruption amounting to theft of crores of rupees. Rai's report claimed corruption in awarding the government contract to conduct uranium mining. The nature of corruption was dismissing lower bids from eligible contractors due to technicalities in completing a form, while overlooking comparable errors in the form of the selected contractor's significantly higher bid. Overall, Rai wanted investigation of various contracts over 2008-2015 and amounting to Rs 970 crore.

He also reported that the Indian army including the Sashastra Seema Bal had killed two members of the National Democratic Front of Boroland in a fake police encounter. The killing happened on 30 March, and Rai documented the investigation on 17 April. In his report, Rai claimed that multiple government agencies coordinated to perform the killing. In June 2017 the government transferred Rai to another post with immediate effect and the unusual order that he need not give any orientation to the person replacing him at his post.

When he reported these things to the Ranchi office of the Central Bureau of Investigation, the Home Ministry issued a criminal chargesheet against him which included accusations that he incorrectly or inappropriately conducted the investigation. The chargesheet also had the effect of making Rai ineligible for an anticipated promotion.

== Leaving civil service ==
Rahul Sharma, a former police officer turned civil rights lawyer, has represented Rai in his complaints about harassment following his whistleblower activity.

Rai claimed that academic test observers harassed him with cheating accusations while he sought his undergraduate law degree. The Gujarat High Court considered the cheating allegations and reported finding no evidence to support them. Later when Rai sought employment at the Indian Institute of Management Udaipur he instead received a transfer to faraway Shillong.

In August 2018 Rai attempted to retire from the police service. After submitting his 3-month notice to retire, the Ministry of Home Affairs rejected his request. Rai claims that he left his post three months after giving notice to retire, while the government claims that Rai abandoned his post. After Rai quit coming to work, he got a suspension. The ministry also ordered him to leave his home to relocate to Chittoor, Andhra Pradesh during his suspension. His lawyer Sharma has argued that people can choose to retire, and that after his 3-month notice, he is retired and the government cannot suspend him. Had Rai not sought early retirement from the civil service, his expected year of retirement would have been 2025.

Following his leave from government service Rai joined the Indian Institute of Management Ahmedabad as an assistant professor. The Ministry of Home Affairs requested that this school not appoint Rai while he is suspended, but the Ministry of Education replied by saying that the school is autonomous and manages itself.

== Recognition ==
The Statesman praised Rai along with Sanjiv Bhatt and Rahul Sharma as being among the senior IPS officers who had been defending the constitutional rights and law since the 2002 Gujarat riots.

Hindustan Times praised Rai for his courage in as a whistleblower in the encounter killings of Sohrabuddin Sheikh, Sohra's wife, Tulsiram, and the NDFB members.
