= Death of Sohrabuddin Sheikh =

2005 death event of Indian gangster

- Date: 26 November 2005
- Location: Vishala Circle, Ahmedabad, Gujarat
- Result: Killing of Sohrabuddin Sheikh

Parties
Gujarat Police	Sohrabuddin Sheikh

Casualties and losses
	1 death

The Sohrabuddin Sheikh encounter case is a criminal case in the Gujarat state after the death of Sohrabuddin Anwarhussain Sheikh on 26 November 2005.

On 26 November police shot and killed Sohrabuddin in what they described as an encounter killing. On 28–29 November in a village in Ilol someone murdered Kauser (Kausar) Bi. Her body was burned. Some reports indicated she had also been raped. In December Sohrabuddin's brother wrote to the Chief Justice of India claiming murder with police involvement. In response, the Supreme Court of India directed the Criminal Investigation Department in Gujarat to take the case from police and themselves investigate it. A year later, on 26 December 2006, police reported that Tulsiram had escaped from police custody. On 28 December, a police encounter led to the Tulsiram Prajapati killing between the town of Ambaji and the village of Sarhad Chapri near the border between Gujarat and Rajasthan. In May 2014, Narendra Modi became Prime Minister of India, which was related to the case because defendant Amit Shah was his close advisor. The court later discharged Shah from the case.

When the trial presided over by Judge SJ Sharma, began in november 2017 Of 210 witnesses, 92 withdraw or change their earlier testimony and become hostile. The special court later acquitted the 22 accused police and officials. and D. G. Vanzara.

== Background and timeline ==
=== Involved persons ===
Accused non-governmental criminals and their associates include Sohrabuddin Sheikh, his wife Kauser Bi, Tulsiram Prajapati, and Sylvester Daniel. Accused police and officials include Vipul Aggarwal, Abhay Chudasama, Geetha Johri, Dinesh MN, Rajkumar Pandian, P.P. Pandey, Ashish Pandya, Amit Shah, and D. G. Vanzara. Judges, lawyers, and prosecutors involved in the case included Brijgopal Harkishan Loya and Shrikant Khandalkar.

=== Timeline ===
On 23–24 November 2005, Gujarati police deputy inspector general D. G. Vanzara took custody of history-sheeter Sohrabuddin Sheikh, his wife Kauser (Kausar) Bi, and Tulsiram Prajapati as they travelled by bus in Sangli, Maharashtra. Vanzara sent Tulsiram to Ahmedabad, Gujarat, where the Rajasthan police took custody of him and took him to Udaipur, Rajasthan.

On 26 November police shot and killed Sohrabuddin in an encounter killing. On 28–29 November, in a village in Ilol someone murdered Kauser Bi (or Kausar Bi) and burned her body. Some accounts claimed she had also been raped. In December, Sohrabuddin's brother wrote to the Chief Justice of India claiming murder with police involvement. In response, the Supreme Court of India directed the Criminal Investigation Department in Gujarat to take the case from police and themselves investigate it. A year later, on 26 December 2006, police reported that Tulsiram had escaped from police custody.On 28 December, a police encounter led to the Tulsiram Prajapati killing between the town of Ambaji and the village of Sarhad Chapri near the border between Gujarat and Rajasthan.

In February 2007, DIG Rajnish Rai submitted a report to the CID. In April, Rai arrested fellow IPS officers Dinesh MN, Rajkumar Pandian, and D. G. Vanzara. Weeks later Rai leaves the case investigation.

Early in 2010 the Supreme Court transfers the investigation of the case from the police in Gujarat to the CBI office in Mumbai. In April 2010 CBI arrests DIG Abhay Chudasama on charges of criminal collaboration with the deceased Sohrabuddin. Chudasama was the 14th police officer arrested in the case. In July 2010 CBI chargesheeted and arrested Amit Shah, who was then Minister of State for the Government of Gujarat.

In April 2011 CBI took control of the investigation into the Tulsiram Prajapati killing. In 2012 the SC transferred the trial from the Gujarat High Court to the Bombay High Court to promote a more fair trial. In 2013 the SC combined the cases of Sohrabuddin, his wife Kauser Bi, and Tulsiram.

In May 2014 Narendra Modi became Prime Minister of India, which was related to the case because defendant Amit Shah was his close advisor. The SC had stated that one judge should oversee the entire case. The first judge, J T Utpat, had ordered Amit Shah to appear in court. Judge Utpat left the case for unclear reasons in June 2014 and BH Loya replaced him. Judge Loya also insisted that Shah appear in court. In December 2014 Judge Loya died in strange circumstances, according to the Deccan Herald. Judge MB Gosavi replaced Loya. That month, the court discharged Amit Shah from the case as court found no evidence against Shah.

In November 2015, Sohrabuddin's brother petitioned the Bombay High Court with a challenge Shah's discharge. Within days, he withdraws his petition. Activist Harsh Mander petitioned the court with his own challenge against Shah's discharge first to the Bombay court then the SC, but by the end of 2016 both courts dismissed Mander for lack of standing.

In November 2017 CBI Judge SJ Sharma begins the trial. Of 210 witnesses, 92 withdrew or changed their earlier testimony and become hostile witnesses. That same month, The Caravan publishes a story from Judge Loya's family in which they describe strange and hidden circumstances of his death. In January 2018, Judge Dipak Misra declares that Loya's death was by natural causes. In September 2018, the court discharges several of the accused including Dinesh, Pandian, and Vanzara. In November the witness examination ends without the defence producing any witnesses. In December the court heard final arguments, and on 21 December the court discharged all 22 accused due to lack of evidence.

== Cases against Sohrabuddin Sheikh ==
Sohrabuddin Sheikh was accused of possessing 40 AK-47 assault rifles that were recovered from his house in Jharania village of Ujjain district in 1995. At the time of his killing, he also had more than 60 pending cases against him, ranging from extorting protection money from marble factories in Gujarat and Rajasthan, to arms smuggling in Madhya Pradesh, to murder cases both in Gujarat and Rajasthan. According to the police, Sheikh was an underworld criminal with links to the Sharifkhan Pathan (alias Chhota Dawood) and Abdul Latif gangs, and with Rasool Parti and Brajesh Singh, both known to be close to India's underworld kingpin Dawood Ibrahim. To escape the police, Sheikh fled with his family from Gujarat to Hyderabad, Telangana.

=== Encounter ===
On 23 November 2005, Sohrabuddin Sheikh was travelling on a public bus with his wife, Kauser (Kausar) Bi, from Hyderabad to Sangli, Maharashtra. At 01:30 am, the Gujarat police ATS stopped the bus and took them away. She wanted to stay with her husband but was taken to a Disha farmhouse outside Ahmedabad instead. Three days later, Sheikh was killed in an encounter killing on a highway at Vishala Circle near Ahmedabad. The report filed in the Supreme Court by the Central Bureau of Investigation (CBI) quotes a number of witnesses and builds up a narrative of the killing.

== Exposure and state investigations ==
The encounter killing was not exposed until a media report made a year later. This report, together with a petition filed in the Supreme Court by Sheikh's brother, led to investigations into the incident. In April 2007, senior state police officers were arrested for their connection to the case.

=== Media report and Supreme Court petition ===
The encounter killing was exposed after a few police inspectors boasted about it over drinks with the journalist Prashant Dayal, who conducted his own investigations at the farmhouse, and then at Ilol. He ascertained that a burqa-clad woman had been cremated there. He then broke the story in November 2006, in the leading Gujarati newspaper, Divya Bhaskar, and gave details of the encounter.

Meanwhile, Sheikh's brother Rubabuddin petitioned the Supreme Court claiming that the Gujarat police had orchestrated the encounter and demanded to be given information on the location of his sister-in-law Kauser. In March 2007, the Supreme Court ordered the state Criminal Investigation Department to conduct a time-bound investigation. Inspector-General Geetha Johri was given the task of conducting the investigation, and was to report directly to the court. She gathered evidence that implicated the role of several police officers in the encounter. However, it has been claimed that she may have "steered clear of linking them to a political conspiracy". Based on the evidence collected by Johri, DIG Police Rajnish Rai on 24 April 2007, arrested DIG (Border Range) D G Vanzara and Rajkumar Pandian, Superintendent of Police with the Intelligence Bureau, and M.N. Dinesh of Rajasthan police, who is alleged to have been working at the behest of the marble lobby.

The Supreme Court asked the Gujarat government to place before it the inquiry reports prepared by Johri, which had allegedly said that Sheikh was killed in an encounter killing. Johri was removed from the investigation after this report was published. On 3 May 2007, the court asked the government whether Johri had been dismissed from the investigation so that a further probe would not be carried out, and directed it to submit a final report on 15 May, the day scheduled for the final order.

=== Inspector General's report ===
In Part B of the report, Johri recorded facts relating to repeated attempts by the accused police officers and Amit Shah to sabotage the Supreme Court mandated enquiry. The report states that Shah "brought to bear pressure" on the enquiry process, with the result that Ms. Johri was directed to suspend the enquiry and the enquiry papers were taken away from her "under the guise of scrutiny." Johri also records that Shah even "directed Shri G.C. Raigar, Additional Director General of Police, CID (Crime & Railways) to provide him with the list of witnesses, both police and private, who are yet to be contacted by CID (Crime) for recording their statement in the said enquiry."

The government was asked by the court to give the reason for Johri's removal from the case on 15 May. Not finding the Gujarat government's explanations satisfactory, the bench of Justices Tarun Chatterjee and P.K. Balasubramanyam ruled that Johri would report directly to the Supreme Court. She was reinstated in the same position and also asked to head the case.

== Allegations of involvement in Haren Pandya murder ==
The newspaper DNA, citing sources in the Gujarat State Police, reported in August 2011 that Sohrabuddin and Tulsiram may have been "used to kill Haren Pandya", the erstwhile BJP leader who was once close to Narendra Modi. The murder remains unsolved after 12 people arrested for it were released in what the high court called a "botched up and blinkered" investigation.

According to the DNA report, Sohrabuddin was initially given the task but he backpedalled and the murder was eventually executed by Tulsiram. The encounter killings of Sohrabuddin and Tulsiram were a result of unease among the conspirators who lost confidence in Sohrabuddin and Tulsiram. A similar charge was made by ex-IPS officer Sanjiv Bhatt, who discovered evidence for Sohrabuddin and Tulsiram's involvement and forwarded it to Amit Shah, who sounded "very disturbed over the telephone" and asked him "not to speak about it to anyone". Bhatt followed this up with a letter to Shah detailing the "involvement of Sohrabuddin and some policemen in the murder". Bhatt was subsequently suspended from the Gujarat police.

== CBI enquiry ==
Despite the detailed nature of the Johri report, the Supreme Court felt impelled, given the allegations of involvement by senior politicians, that the case should be transferred to the Central Bureau of Investigation for investigation. Since 2007, the Gujarat government had strongly resisted these attempts. The CBI took help of Tirath Das Dogra of AIIMS New Delhi and Forensic experts of Central Forensic Science Laboratory New Delhi in Forensic investigations.

Media pressure began building up, with calls from organisations such as Amnesty International. Eventually, on 12 January 2010, the Supreme Court observed that "the facts surrounding Prajapati's death evokes strong suspicion that a deliberate attempt was made to destroy a human witness". The court then directed the CBI to take over the probe.

Subsequently, the CBI arrested senior Gujarat police officer Abhay Chudasama, who was charged with extortion in partnership with Sheikh. After Chudasama's arrest, the CBI also charged the now ex-home minister Shah with collusion.

Suspicion of political interference intensified after the evidence handed over to the CBI from the state investigations showed that 331 phone calls by Shah to the concerned police officers had been deleted from the records. After media reports revealed the original records of calls from Shah to Vanzara and other police officers executing the killings, the CBI acquired the original records, and ex-police chief O.P. Mathur, who was then Director of Raksha Shakti University, was indicted for deleting evidence. Shah was subsequently named as the "prime accused" in the case.

A CBI witness also claimed that they were paid Rs. 10 crores by R.K. Patni, the owner of RK marbles who was acquainted with Indian National Congress leaders, to eliminate Sheikh. BJP MLAs Gulab Chand Kataria and Om Prakash Mathur from the neighbouring state of Rajasthan were also named in the case. Kataria had visited Gujarat to lobby for the release of Rajasthan police officer Dinesh M.N. in 2007. denied all charges. On 1 September 2013, IPS Officer D.G. Vanzara resigned, blaming lack of interest shown by State Government in rescuing him and other police officers jailed in fake encounter cases. Dinesh M. N. was granted bail in May 2014. He had served seven years in jail due to cases. The Special Court had discharged Amit Shah from the case due to lack of evidence in December 2014. Police officers D.G. Vanzara and Dinesh M.N. were acquitted in August 2017 due to lack of evidence.

== Reactions ==
As the case included the high ranking BJP politician Amit Shah, the opposition party including Rahul Gandhi criticised the case throughout. When the court found no evidence of guilt at the end, Gandhi remarked that somehow various people died from strange circumstances.

In 2007, Amnesty International criticised the police investigation and the practice of encounter killings by Indian police.

A publication advocating for rule of law in India criticised the circumstances of the case for the normalisation of extraordinary and gruesome occurrences, and for out of process police investigation, and for unacceptably poor courtroom proceedings.

News sources including The Hindu, Deccan Herald, and The Indian Express described the case as a failure of the justice system. The National Herald claimed the court had inappropriately issued a gag order to prevent media coverage of the case.

Legal commentators Harsh Mander and Sarim Naved claimed the case demonstrated the Indian justice system was incapabable of effectively managing large court cases involving high-profile people. Legal blog Bar and Bench used the case to talk about various challenges in the Indian legal system.

== See also ==
- Tulsiram Prajapati killing
- 1982 Gonda Encounter
- Ishrat Jahan encounter killing
- Ranbir Singh case
