= Swapna Sanjiv Joshi =

Judge of Bombay High Court

Swapna Sanjiv Joshi (born 26 August 1959) is a sitting judge in the Bombay High Court in Maharashtra, India. Joshi attracted public attention after a fellow judge, Brijgopal Harkishan Loya, who had heard the Sohrabuddin Sheikh fake encounter case, died under mysterious circumstances after attending her daughter's wedding in Nagpur. Joshi subsequently recused herself from hearing a case concerning allegations of poisoning in relation to Loya's death.

== Life ==
Joshi was educated primarily in Gondia, Maharashtra, where she obtained a B.Sc. and an LL.B degree.

== Judicial career ==
Joshi enrolled as an advocate in 1981 and practiced in Gondia before being appointed as a judge in the City Civil and Sessions Court in Mumbai in 1995. Between 2004 and 2005, she was a judge in the Family Court in Mumbai before returning to the City Civil Court until 2008. She also served as a judge in special courts constituted under the Prevention of Terrorism Act 2002, the Maharashtra Control of Organised Crime Act, and in special courts constituted to try offences related to corruption and sexual assault. From 2008 to 2011, she was the principal district judge in Chandrapur, Maharashtra, and from 2011-2013, she was the Principal Judge in the City Civil and Sessions Court in Mumbai. From 2013 to 2016, she was a member of the Maharashtra Legal Services Authority, before being appointed as a judge to the Bombay High Court on 28 March 2016.

In 2010, Joshi, while serving as a district judge in Chandrapur, wrote to the Bombay High Court to complain about remarks made by the local deputy superintendent of police, Chhering Dorje, about her performance as a judge. Joshi had required Dorje to attend a series of meeting concerning the issue of warrants in lower courts in the district, as Dorje had missed several such meetings already, and was alleged to have spoken "badly" by Joshi. Dorje was summoned by the Bombay High Court and asked to account for his remarks to Joshi.

In November 2014, a colleague of Joshi, fellow judge Brijgopal Harkishan Loya, died under mysterious circumstances after attending her daughter's wedding in Nagpur. In 2018, Joshi recused herself from hearing a case in relation to a claim that Loya had been poisoned, and did not provide reasons for the recusal.
