= Ashish Pandya =

Indian police service officer

Ashish Pandya is a Dy.SP in the Indian Police Service, in the state of Gujarat. He came to prominence in the media as the leader of the police force accused of an encounter in the Tulsiram Prajapati killing.

Pandya had fired the bullet which killed Prajapati in December 2006. The discussion about the case described that Pandya managed the logistics or led the encounter with Prajapati. In the legal statements witnesses reported that Pandya had discussed the case privately with DIG D. G. Vanzara, a senior police officer who was also a party to the case.

When Pandya was sought for arrest he avoided police capture. The Criminal Investigation Department declared that Pandya had absconded. On 13 May 2010 he turned himself in to the police.

In 2012 Pandya played the role of approver to the court by accusing other people in the case of faults. The court noted this in 2015 when various people arrested in the case made a request for bail.

In May 2015 after Pandya got bail and left the jail he also got permission to rejoin the police force. He got a new post as Circle Inspector of police in Bhuj.

In December 2018 Pandya was one of 22 people discharged from the court proceedings.
