= Vipul Aggarwal =

Indian police officer

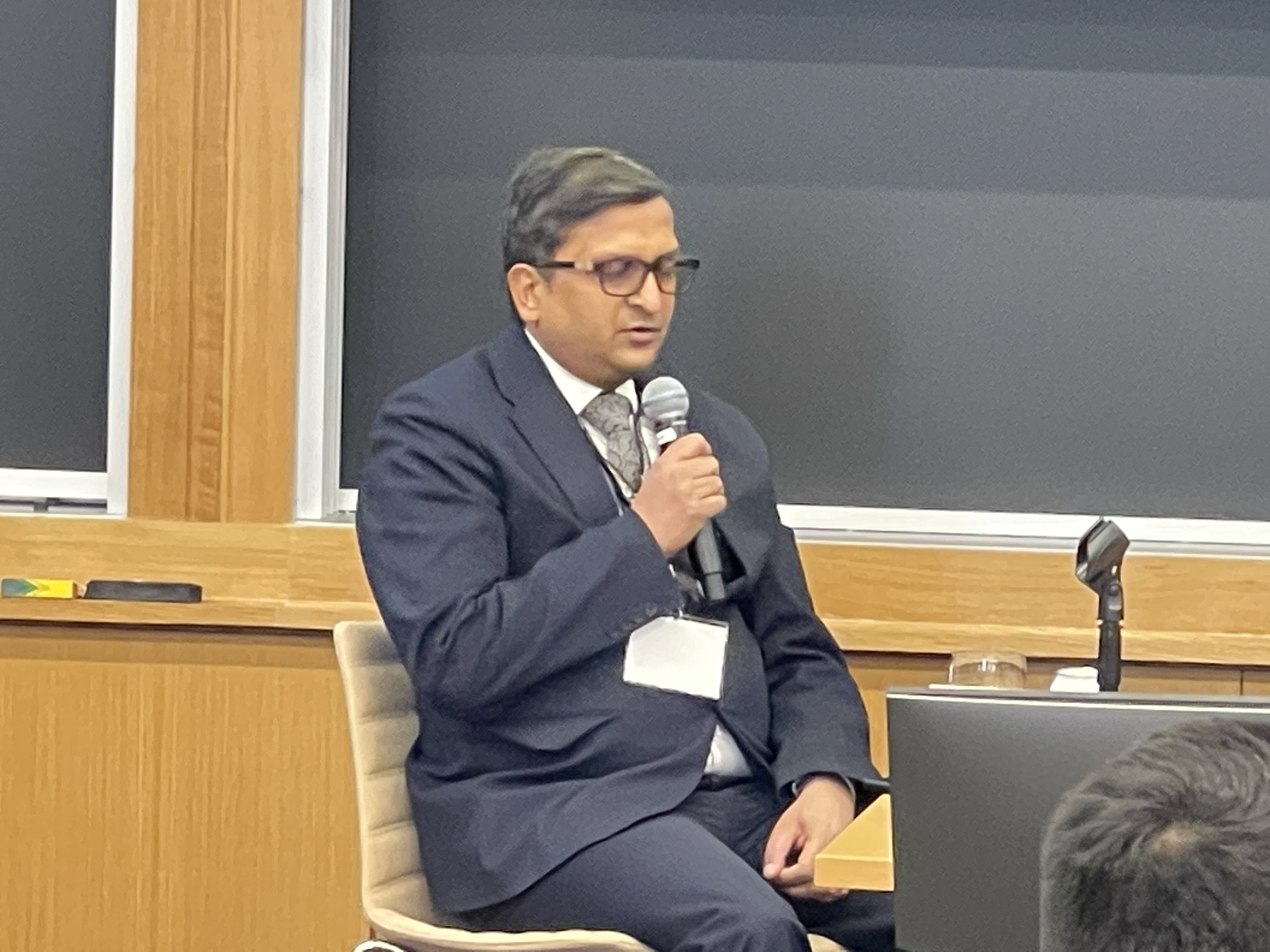
- Vipul Aggarwal at Harvard India Conference 2023
- Born: 8 July 1976 (age 50); Delhi, India
- Education: Maulana Azad Medical College; Harvard University
- Occupation: Civil servant
- Years active: 2001-
- Notable work: Served as Deputy CEO of National Health Authority and Joint Secretary in the Department of Health & Family Welfare

Dr. Vipul Aggarwal is a 2001 batch Indian Police Service (IPS) officer from the Gujarat cadre. He is currently serving as Joint Secretary in the Ministry of Development of North Eastern Region. He was appointed as the Principal Commissioner of the Delhi Development Authority (DDA) in March 2024.

Before this, he served as the Joint Secretary in the Department of Health & Family Welfare. Prior to this, he also served as the Deputy CEO of the National Health Authority, a government agency responsible for implementing healthcare schemes in India, from February 2020 to August 2022. During his tenure, he played a pivotal role in the policy formulation and implementation of the world's largest health assurance scheme, Ayushman Bharat Pradhan Mantri Jan Arogya Yojana (AB PM-JAY), which provided coverage to an estimated 540 million Indian citizens. Aggarwal completed his PhD and has served as a researcher and policy fellow at the Harvard T.H. Chan School of Public Health. Having completed his Master of Public Health (MPH) from the same institution, he continues to contribute to research projects related to public health and policy.

== Early life and education ==
Aggarwal was born and raised in Delhi, India, where he completed his primary and secondary education. He attended Delhi Public School, R K Puram, and was the All India topper in his grade 10 secondary school examination. Vipul Aggarwal received an MBBS from Maulana Azad Medical College in 1999 with a gold medal in forensic medicine.

== Career ==
Vipul joined the Indian Police Service in 2001 from the Gujarat cadre. At the Sardar Vallabh Bhai National Police Academy (SVPNPA) he was the batch topper and the recipient of the coveted Home Minister's Revolver and PM's Baton for “Best All-Round Officer Trainee". In 2010 Aggarwal was police superintendent in the Dahod district.

Aggarwal held several key positions in law enforcement in India, including Superintendent of Police in Porbandar, Banaskantha, and Dahod districts, as well as Joint Commissioner of Police for Ahmedabad city. Notably, during his time as Superintendent of Police in Porbandar, Aggarwal apprehended notorious criminal Santokben Jadeja. He is also credited with implementing a number of successful reforms as district police chief of Dahod, earning him high praise from the public and official recognition.

During his time in Ahmedabad, Aggarwal adopted 100 children affected by Thalassemia, and was instrumental in making the city police the first comprehensive ISO certified police force in India. His contributions to law enforcement were significant, and his innovative approach resulted in improvements in the quality and efficiency of police services.

=== Health administration ===
At the end of 2014 Aggarwal was eligible for a government posting but without a position in the police service. In January 2015 he accepted an appointment as director of the National Rural Health Mission (NRHM). Around this time he also took police training for 7 weeks in Australia.

Aggarwal's training in Australia could have made him eligible for promotion in the police force. While he was in training and away from his post, the 2015 Indian swine flu outbreak became severe. In the context of the pandemic and after relieving from NRHM Aggarwal, was available for another government posting. Aggarwal then joined the Gujarat Medical Service Corporation as director.

Before being appointed as Deputy (CEO) of the National Health Authority (NHA) in February 2020, Aggarwal served as the Joint Commissioner of Police (Administration) in Ahmedabad, Gujarat. In that role, he was responsible for administrative functions, including human resources and financial management. As Deputy CEO of the National Health Authority, Aggarwal oversaw the implementation and operational management of the Ayushman Bharat Pradhan Mantri Jan Arogya yojana (PM-JAY). His responsibilities included policy implementation, hospital empanelment, fraud detection, operational monitoring, and the use of data analytics to support the scheme's administration, including during COVID-19 pandemic.

==== COVID-19 Management ====
Aggarwal also held the responsibility of managing the 1075 COVID helpline of the government of India and was the nodal officer for managing hospital payments during the pandemic. He also coordinated the CoWIN global conclave, which was inaugurated by Prime minister Narendra Modi and where India presented the CoWIN platform to the world. 142 countries participated in the conclave.

== Death of Sohrabuddin Sheikh ==
In May 2010 the Central Bureau of Investigation arrested Aggarwal and others on accusations of their involvement in the Tulsiram Prajapati killing and the death of Sohrabuddin Sheikh. The investigation and case ran from Sohrabuddin's death in 2005 till the end of a trail in 2018, including many turns and twists. On 10 October 2014 the Bombay High Court granted Aggarwal bail after he had been incarcerated for four years. A month later, Aggarwal rejoined the police force after the Gujarat government revoked his suspension. In September 2018 Aggarwal was one of a few officers to get discharged from the case for lack of any evidence. In December 2018 the case ended with the discharge of remaining defendants.

Aggarwal's supporters said that prosecutors charged him due to mistaken association with D. G. Vanzara. Supporters said that at the time of his arrest, he only had ₹23,000 as movable assets and consequently they organized a fundraiser for his legal defense. A 2012 profile of Aggarwal described him as wealthy after using a RTI request to find that he owned real estate worth ₹1.35 crores. However it was reportedly due to revaluation of his residential house purchased before joining the government service.

Shortly after his detention, the court held Aggarwal in additional remand in the course of the investigation. The police incarcerated Aggarwal in Palanpur. While incarcerated the Gujarat High Court had refused to release him on bail. The CBI alleged that Aggarwal could tamper with evidence if released on bail. Prosecutors named then Gujarat state minister Amit Shah as being key conspirator in the case and Aggarwal as the key offender.

== Other activities ==
In 2019 Aggarwal made public announcements inviting the public to have coffee with him while discussing community and government.

Aggarwal requested education reform in the arbitrary CBSE practical exam grading system.

Various tabloid journalists reported an argument in which Aggarwal countered some socio political twitter comments of actress Swara Bhaskar.

Aggarwal was a panelist at the Harvard India Conference 2023, where he spoke about India's PM-JAY program and the path towards achieving Universal Health Coverage.
