= Rajkumar Pandian =

Indian Police Service officer

Rajkumar Pandian (RK Pandian) is an Indian Police Service officer. He came to attention over claims in the death of Sohrabuddin Sheikh. From 2016 he was Inspector-general of police in Junagadh, even while the Sohrabuddin case was in courts. In 2018 the Bombay High Court upheld his discharge from this case.

== Sohrabuddin case ==
In 2007 Rajnish Rai arrested Pandian along with D G Vanzara and Dinesh M N related to the death of Sohrabuddin Sheikh. In March 2014 Pandian got bail after having been in prison for seven years since his 2007 arrest.

In April 2013 The Hindu reported that Pandian was found to be at his home during the time when he was supposed to be incarcerated. The explanation seemed to be that Pandian was getting undisclosed and favored treatment to leave the jail.

== After 2014 ==
In 2016 Pandian held a position at the Gujarat Industrial Development Corporation. Following that position, he took a post as Inspector-general of police in Junagadh. There was consideration in 2017 that he might take a post in the Ahmedabad crime Branch.

In February 2018 Pandian claimed that the Central Bureau of Investigation had framed him in the Sohrabuddin case. In 2018 the Bombay High Court upheld Pandian's discharge from the Sohrabuddin case.

In 2019 Pandian arrested cybercriminals who had stolen money from his wife.

In 2019 Pandian expressed interest in reviewing criminal complaints about land disputes.

== Comments on police work ==
In his role as a police officer Pandian has regularly given comment to the media on law enforcement. In 2018 he commented on a violent crime. In 2020 he commented on enforcing COVID-19 quarantine. In December 2020 he commented on the use of CCTV to monitor traffic safety.
