= 1982 Gonda Encounter =

Criminal case in Gonda district, India

The 1982 Gonda Encounter is an ongoing criminal case involving the murder of 13 people including the Deputy Superintendent of police in Gonda district of the Indian state of Uttar Pradesh. On 5 March 2013 three police personnel were given capital punishment and five others were given life-time imprisonment by the special CBI court in Lucknow. The case has been described as the "Rarest of rare cases" and also for the slow process of the Indian judicial system since the verdict was announced after 31 years.

== Alleged encounter and killing ==
An alleged group clash had occurred on the night of 12 March 1982 in Madhavpur village located within the Katrabazar police station area in Gonda district. Deputy Superintendent of Police (DSP) Krishna Pratap Singh (K P Singh), on getting the information about the criminals Ram Bhulawan and Arjun Pasi, went to the village with the police. K P Singh was later taken to the hospital where doctors declared him brought dead. 12 other people also died who were later declared dacoits by R B Saroj (who was head of police station) and his partners. The police later submitted a report saying the DSP was killed by dacoits in a bomb attack and the policemen killed the dacoits in an encounter. They also showed the bodies of 12 people as evidence.

== Allegations and investigation ==
The reason for the alleged killing was said to be the enmity between Deputy Superintendent of police, K P Singh, and his subordinates, whom he suspected of having close co-operation with the local criminals. K P Singh had ordered inquiry against the then sub-inspector R.B. Saroj. Yashpal Singh, then SP of Gonda (later DGP of UP Police from Jan 2005 to Apr 2006), started the investigation. After the inquiry, he was removed. The police initially maintained that Singh was killed by criminals. The SHO of Katra Bazar Police Station, Tirath Rajpal, investigated the incident and gave the cops a clean chit, however K P Singh's wife, Vibha Singh (then a PCS Officer) and state president of the People's Union for Civil Liberties Chitranjan Singh, alleged that her husband's subordinates had conspired to kill him. On her complaint, the local officers refused to take action. Vibha Singh then approached the High Court and a CBI investigation was ordered on Supreme Court's intervention. The CBI registered an FIR on 24 February 1984, accusing the cops of killing the DSP and villagers in a fake encounter, finally a charge sheet was filed against 19 policemen by the CBI on 28 February 1989, and 7 September 2001.

Preliminary investigation had found encounter as doubtful as the CBI found the death of the DSP as mysterious and had found evidence that K P Singh was probing a number of inquires pending against R B Saroj related to allegations of corruption, bribery and human rights violations. The encounter though told by the police to have lasted for hours, but there were no signs of bullets on any house and no villager was injured. The statement of witnesses, villagers and doctors contradicted the statement by the police. The investigating agency found most of the firearms shown recovered from the villagers in the alleged encounter were not in working condition.

== Verdict ==
After 24 long years of investigation, the special CBI court convicted eight policemen on 29 March 2013. In the trial period of 19 policemen who were charge sheeted, 10 had died and seven had retired. On 5 April 2013, the CBI court judge Rajendra Singh announced death penalty for three policemen and life imprisonment for the five remaining accused. The CBI's special public prosecutor Sanjai Kumar mentioned that the encounter took place on the night of 12 March 1982, when the chief conspirator R B Saroj executed the plan to kill the then DSP K P Singh with other police men. The charge sheet says that R B Saroj, against whom investigations were going on by Mr. Singh, made a story of movement of criminals in the Madhavpur area and decided to take on the criminals when Singh and other cops joined him. The prosecutor also said that 12 villagers were killed. The accused later told that the dacoits killed the DSP whom they killed in firing.

"All evidence shows... RB Saroj killed the DSP, who was then a 25-year-old. No doubt he (Saroj) had the support of those persons whom the CBI did not chargesheet for reasons known to it," the court observed. The court also said pointing the evidence of killing them in cold blood, "The motive...was to commit the murder of CO and 12 persons. The Forensic Science Laboratory report shows that the ammunitions recovered were not of corresponding arms and the post-mortem report of 12 persons showed that they were shot dead while in standing position at a very close range." The CBI judge also said, "The manner of the killing of DSP KP Singh and 12 villagers and thereafter creating false encounter memo and fake recovery memos makes it rarest of rare case," and turned down the appeal from the accused side to deliver a lighter punishment. The main accused RB Saroj who was posted as a sub-inspector in Gonda in 1982 claimed to have been implicated by the CBI in the case only because the investigators had wanted to give a clean chit to the senior officers. The court after the judgement took the guilty accused into custody and sent them to jail.

The following is the list of the accused:

Accused	Charges	Judgement
R B Saroj, Ram Nayak Pandey and Ram Karan Singh Yadav	Conspiring to kill the DSP and 12 villagers	Capital Punishment
Nasim Ahmad, Ramakant Dixit, Mangla Singh, Pervez Hussain and Rajendra Prasad Singh	Supporting the conspiracy and suppression of facts	Life time imprisonment
Prem Singh	Supporting the conspiracy and suppression of facts	Acquitted

Following the judgement of CBI Court, the Allahabad High Court acquitted all six police officers, ruling that the encounter was genuine.

== Impact and eyewitness accounts ==
The case and the outcome is seen as the very slow process of the Indian judicial system since it took 31 years after the murder and 27 years after the charge sheet to deliver the first verdict. The CBI judge Rajendra Singh stated it as the "rarest of the rare cases. The case is also marked for holding total of eight policemen guilty." But the case is also noted for its slow judgement and the failure of the agency to solve the case and deliver the result in time. The court criticized the CBI for the pace of investigation. The court on pronouncing the verdict said, "The evidence on record indicated conspiracy at a high level but the CBI kept its eyes closed".

The deceased DSP's daughter, Kinjal Singh, who is an IAS officer and district magistrate of Lakhimpur Kheri district, broke down during the judgement and recalled her father as honest and her mother's consistent fight against the accused. Her sister Pranjal Singh is an Indian Revenue Service (IRS) officer. She and her relatives, who were present in the court appreciated the court decision. Scores of eyewitnesses also told the media how they saw their dear ones were killed in front of them by the accused, but they could do nothing.

== See also ==
- Ranbir Singh case
