= Prem Chandra Dhanda =

Indian physician and medical academic awarded with Padma Bhushan in 1962 in medicine

- Born: 28 May 1911; Ambala, Haryana, India
- Died: 28 February 2013 (aged 101)
- Education: Government College, Lahore; King Edward Medical College
- Occupations: Physician; Medical academic
- Spouse: Leila Dharmavir
- Children: 2
- Awards: Padma Bhushan

Prem Chandra Dhanda (28 May 1911 – 28 February 2013) was an Indian physician and a medical academic. He was the principal of the Maulana Azad Medical College, New Delhi and the director of G. B. Pant Hospital, New Delhi. The Government of India awarded him the third highest civilian honour of the Padma Bhushan, in 1962, for his contributions to medicine.

== Biography ==
Born in Ambala, in the present day Haryana to Dunichand Ambalvi, a lawyer, he did his education at Anglo Sanskrit High School, Government College and King Edward Medical College in Lahore, after which he worked at Hammersmith Hospital, London, simultaneously completing the MRCP course. His Indian career started in 1938 when he joined Indian Army Medical Corps where he worked for 7 years, reaching the rank of a lieutenant colonel, till his move to Irwin Hospital (presently Lok Nayak Jai Prakash Narayan Hospital), New Delhi in 1945. His efforts were reported behind the establishment of the Maulana Azad Medical College, as a wing of Irwin Hospital, where he later took charge as the director-principal. It was reported that Danda worked at Maulana Azad Medical College on honorary basis, drawing a nominal salary of ₹ 1 per month. He served as the consultant physician to several notable personalities of the time, including Mahatma Gandhi, Jawaharlal Nehru, Sardar Vallabhbhai Patel, Rajendra Prasad, Govind Ballabh Pant and Zakir Husain and was the president of the Delhi Medical Association during 1953–54.

Danda was an elected Fellow of the Royal College of Physicians of London and the National Academy of Medical Sciences. He received the third highest civilian award of the Padma Bhushan from the Government of India in 1962. He was married to Leila Dharmvir and the couple had two daughters. He died three months to his 102nd birthday, on 28 February 2013, his wife having preceded him in death.
