= Sylvester Daniel =

Indian witness

Sylvester Daniel is a person known for having a criminal history and being a key witness in the cases for the death of Sohrabuddin Sheikh and Tulsiram Prajapati killing.

== Early life ==
Daniel's parents both had careers in healthcare. They lived in Rajasthan. Daniel had good grades as a student. He also played sports.

== History sheet ==
When in jail he met a local crime boss who recruited him for more crimes. Again in jail he met Tulsiram Prajapati who introduced him to Sohrabuddin Sheikh. The local criminal culture and police knew of the three as a criminal trio who collaborated. Police later charged Daniel, Tulsiram, and Sohrabuddin with the murder of Hamid Lala, who was another crime boss.

In December 2004 the police arrested Sohrabuddin, Tulsiram, and Daniel for the case known as the "Popular Builders firing". His charge was firing guns at real estate developers with Tulsiram. In this case, these three fired guns at the Patel brothers, who were owners of the Popular Builders real estate company.

== Witness in Sohrabuddin case ==
Daniel came to national attention as a witness in the death of Sohrabuddin Sheikh and its connected Tulsiram Prajapati killing.

In October 2011 after a court appearance Daniel escaped from police custody. There were various stories explaining how he escaped. One story is that he escaped during a toilet break, and another is that he escaped when the police took him to visit his sick mother at her home. Another story is that several police officers drank alcohol with him at his home, and that Daniel escaped after getting them drunk. Another story is that police wanted Daniel to escape.

After escaping Daniel bought a gun. Within 24 hours of escaping police arrested him again.

The police administration charged 5 officers for their actions which led to Daniel's escape.

The Central Bureau of Investigation petitioned the court to not let Daniel out of jail for his own safety, and to thereafter have his legal proceedings in the jail.

In July 2012 Daniel got bail and left jail.
