= Nitin Shrivastava =

Indian urologist and academic

Nitin Shrivastava is an Indian urologist and academic. Srivastava received training from Maulana Azad Medical College and completed his superspecialisation at AIIMS. Dr Nitin was a fellow at Department of Urology at Oxford University. His work revolves around use of robotics for renal oncology.

== Publications ==
- Robot-assisted laparoscopic radical cystectomy with extracorporeal urinary diversion: Initial experience and outcomes, PMID 29692505
- The Spectrum of Clinical and Urodynamic Findings in Patients with Spinal Tuberculosis Exhibiting Lower Urinary Tract Symptoms, before and after Spinal Surgical Intervention with Antitubercular Treatment: A Prospective Study, PMID 30909676
- Punctures versus shocks: a comparison of renal functional and structural changes after percutaneous nephrolithotomy and shockwave lithotripsy for solitary renal stone
- Percutaneous Management of Systemic Fungal Infection Presenting As Bilateral Renal Fungal Ball
- Device malfunction with the da Vinci S® surgical system and its impact on surgical procedures
- Renal cell carcinoma with sarcomatoid transformation, presenting as skin rashes
- Device Malfunction with the da Vinci S Surgical System and Impact on Surgical Procedures: Could Device Aging be Responsible?
