= Kamal Kumar Sethi =

Indian cardiologist

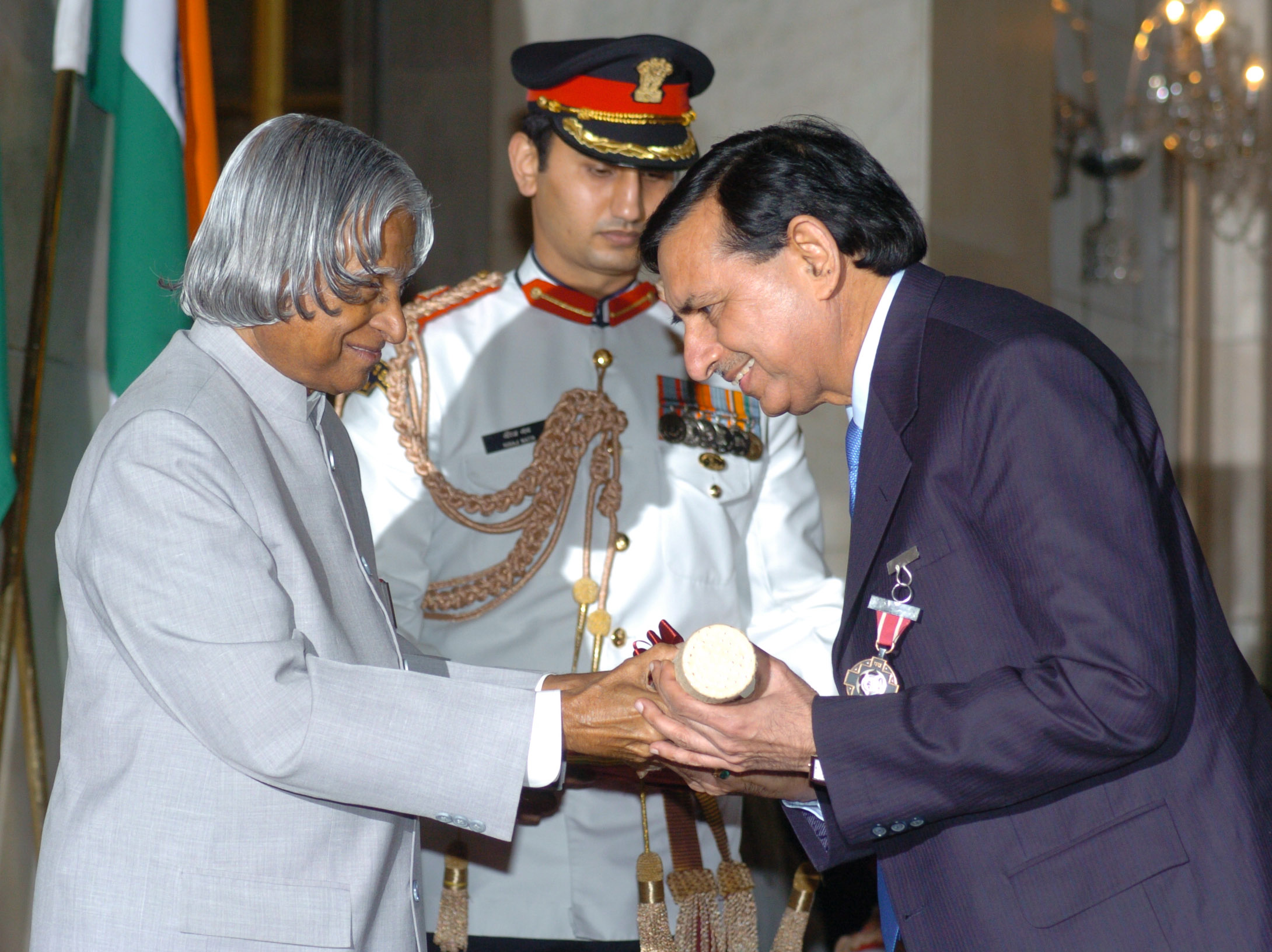
- The President, Dr. A.P.J. Abdul Kalam presenting Padma Shri to Prof. (Dr) Kamal Kumar Sethi.
- Born: India
- Occupations: Interventional cardiologist Medical academic
- Years active: Since 1976
- Known for: Interventional cardiology
- Spouse: Dr. Neelam Sethi
- Children: 3
- Awards: Padma Shri; Andrew Gruentzig Distinguished Interventional Cardiologist Award; Legend in Cardiology Award; DMA Chikitsa Ratan Award; WCCPC Lifetime Achievement Award; IHRS Carrier Achievement Award; MAMC Alumnus Award; B. C. Roy Memorial Doctors; State Award; Searle Award; D. P. Basu Award

Kamal Kumar Sethi is an Indian cardiologist

medical academic and administrator, known for the performance of the first catheter ablation in India. (Note: Catheter ablation is an invasive procedure used to correct a faulty electrical pathway in the heart.) He is the chairman and managing director of Delhi Heart and Lung Institute and a former president of the Cardiological Society of India and the Indian Society of Electrocardiology. He is a recipient of several honors including the Legend in Cardiology Award of the Delhi Medical Association and Andrew Gruentzig Distinguished Interventional Cardiologist Award of the Cardiovascular Society of India. The Government of India awarded him the fourth highest civilian honour of the Padma Shri, in 2006, for his contributions to medical science.

== Biography ==
K. K. Sethi, a graduate of the Maulana Azad Medical College (MAMC) of the University of Delhi (1971), secured his MD (1976) and DM (cardiology) (1979) from the same institution. His career started at G. B. Pant Hospital, the parent hospital of MAMC, where he served for 20 years, retiring as a professor of cardiology. Subsequently, he joined Delhi Heart and Lung Institute and serves as the chairman and managing director of the institution. He is a fellow of several medical societies such as American College of Cardiology, Cardiological Society of India, Heart Rhythm Society and Indian Society of Electrocardiology and is a former president of Indian Society of Electrocardiology (2007) and Cardiological Society of India (1997–98). He has served as the editor of Indian Heart Journal and is a member of its advisory board. Delhi Medical Association honored him with two awards, Legend in Cardiology Award in 2005 and Chikitsa Ratan Award in 2010. He is a recipients of several honors such as D. P. Basu Award (1981), Searle Award (1983), B. C. Roy Memorial Doctors State Award of the Government of Delhi (1998), Maulana Azad Medical College Alumnus Award (2005), Carrier Achievement Award of Indian Heart Rhythm Society (2007), Lifetime Achievement Award of the World Congress on Clinical and Preventive Cardiology (2006) and Andreas Gruentzig Distinguished Interventional Cardiologist Award of Cardio Vascular Society of India (2008). The Government of India awarded him the civilian honor of the Padma Shri in 2006.
