= Rao Anwar =

Sindh police officer known for extrajuducial killings

- راؤ انوار
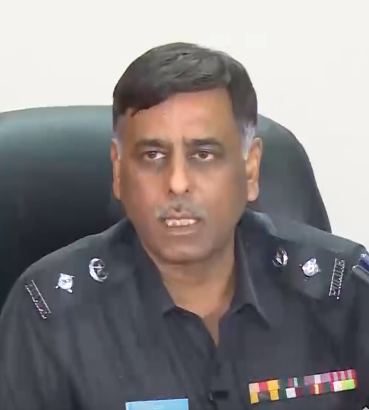
- Anwar in 2019
- Police career
- Department: Sindh Police
- Service years: 37 (1982–2019)
- Status: Retired
- Rank: Senior Superintendent (SSP)

Rao Anwar Ahmed Khan (Urdu: راؤ انوار احمد خان) is a retired Pakistani police officer who served as a Senior Superintendent of Police (SSP) in the Malir District of Karachi. He is known as the "encounter specialist" of the Sindh Police because of extrajudicial killings in alleged encounters, and is linked to at least 444 deaths in alleged encounters between 2011 and 2018. After the killing of Naqeebullah Mehsud, Anwar was suspended from his post on 20 January 2018.

On 10 December 2019, Anwar was blacklisted by the United States Department of the Treasury in the Specially Designated Nationals and Blocked Persons List under the Global Magnitsky Act for his atrocities during his tenure, including the murder of Naqeebullah Mehsud. A year later, the United Kingdom also slapped him with sanctions, which included an asset freeze and travel ban to the UK. On 1 October 2021, Pakistan's National Accountability Bureau (NAB) launched an investigation against Anwar for accumulating assets worth millions of rupees beyond his known sources of income, and approved the seizure of his nine bank accounts.

== Career ==
After working as a clerk under SP Harbour for a year, Anwar became an assistant sub-inspector of police (ASI) in 1982. From 1992 to 1999, Anwar played a main role in the operations against the Muttahida Qaumi Movement (MQM) in Karachi, in which many MQM members were either arrested or killed. When MQM came into power in 2002 during the Pervez Musharraf government, Anwar disappeared from Karachi.

When the Pakistan Peoples Party came into power in 2008, Anwar returned to Karachi. He was promoted from inspector to deputy superintendent of police of Keamari, and then to superintendent of police of Gadap within a short space of time in 2008. He was considered close to the former President of Pakistan Asif Ali Zardari. Anwar became senior superintendent of police (SSP) Malir in 2011.

In 2012, he was demoted to the sub-inspector rank by a Supreme Court order, but Asif Ali Zardari reinstated him as SSP Malir using his executive powers. In 2013, Anwar was temporarily suspended by the Supreme Court following the deadly Abbas Town bombing. In 2015, he was briefly suspended for "misusing authority" because of his controversial press conference, in which he alleged that MQM sent its workers to India to get them trained by the Indian intelligence agency RAW for spreading terror in Pakistan. The MQM activist Tahir Lamba, who had been arrested by Anwar before the press conference and accused of being a RAW agent, was released by the court later due to lack of evidence.

In September 2016, Anwar was suspended for raiding the house of the MQM leader Khawaja Izharul Hassan and detaining him without the permission of the Sindh Assembly speaker. Anwar challenged the suspension order in court and was reinstated a few weeks later.

On 13 January 2018, Anwar led a police operation that led to Naqeebullah Mehsud and three others being shot dead in Karachi's Shah Latif Town. Anwar said they were members of the Pakistani Taliban. On 19 January, Anwar appeared before a departmental inquiry committee to give a statement. He claimed one member of the committee was biased and forced police personnel to record false statements about him. On 20 January, the committee declared that Mehsud was innocent and had been wrongfully killed and Anwar was dismissed from the police. On 22 January, he refused to appear before the committee for a second time, calling the inquiry ‘one-sided’. He claimed he was neither responsible for the investigation nor the capture of Mehsud. Anwar tried to flee Pakistan via Benazir Bhutto International Airport in Islamabad on 23 January. His name was added to the Exit Control List and a First Information Report was lodged against him. Anwar demanded the formation of a ‘Joint Investigative Team’ from intelligence agencies and called the case against him 'baseless'.

On 27 January, the Supreme Court issued a three-day deadline to the Sindh Police Department for Anwar's arrest, saying cell-phone positioning evidence confirmed Anwar's presence at the site of the encounter killing. On 31 January, Anwar refuted reports that he had fled the country after the police had failed to arrest him. On 3 March, his accounts at the State Bank of Pakistan were frozen on the orders of the Supreme Court, which made the judgement in a 16 February hearing for contempt of court.

On 17 February 2018, former president Asif Ali Zardari voiced support for Anwar, calling him a "brave child" for surviving the fight against the Muttahida Qaumi Movement. However, Zardari later said he ‘misspoke’, and retracted the comment. On 21 March 2018, Anwar was arrested after appearing before the Supreme Court.

Anwar retired on 1 January 2019 while facing trial under suspension. Apart from his controversial police encounters, Anwar has also been notorious for being involved in land grabbing and gravel and sand mining in the Malir and Gadap areas of Karachi.

On 24 January 2023, he was acquitted along with 17 others, in the killing of Naqeebullah Mehsud due to lack of evidence. However, lawyer Jibran Nasir refused to accept the verdict and asked the Mehsud family to appeal the verdict in High Court.

== Personal life ==
According to the NADRA officials, Anwar had made 74 trips to Dubai since his appointment as SSP Malir until his removal from the job, that is about one trip per a month on average.

== See also ==
- Killing of Naqeebullah Mehsud
