= Ravinder Goswami =

Indian endocrinologist

- Born: 3 September 1963 (age 62); Delhi, India
- Education: Maulana Azad Medical College; AIIMS Delhi; University of Newcastle; Harvard Medical School
- Known for: Studies on hypoparathyroidism and vitamin D deficiency
- Awards: 2008 Shanti Swarup Bhatnagar Prize
- Scientific career
- Fields: Endocrinology
- Workplaces: AIIMS Delhi
- Doctoral advisor: N. Kochupillai; Patricia Crock; Edward M. Brown

Ravinder Goswami (born 3 September 1963) is an Indian endocrinologist and professor at the department of endocrinology and metabolism at the All India Institute of Medical Sciences, Delhi. Known for his research on vitamin D deficiency, Goswami is an elected fellow of National Academy of Sciences, India and Indian Academy of Sciences. The Council of Scientific and Industrial Research, the apex agency of the Government of India for scientific research, awarded him the Shanti Swarup Bhatnagar Prize for Science and Technology, one of the highest Indian science awards for his contributions to Medical Sciences in 2008. (Note: Long link - please select award year to see details)

== Biography ==
Ravinder Goswami, after earning his bachelor's degree in medicine from Maulana Azad Medical College, continued at the institution to complete his MD and secured a DM in endocrinology from the All India Institute of Medical Sciences, Delhi. He did his post-doctoral work by joining AIIMS in 1992, working under Narayana Panicker Kochupillai and has since been associated with the institution. In between, he had two sabbaticals; first at the University of Newcastle under Patricia Crock and later, at Harvard Medical School at the laboratory of Edward M. Brown. At AIIMS, he served as the sub-dean of research during 2011–13 and is a professor at the department of endocrinology and metabolism.

Goswami lives in East AIIMS campus, in New Delhi.

== Legacy ==
Goswami's studies have been focusing focused on clinical endocrinology and he has carried out research on diseases such as hypocalcemia and idiopathic hypoparathyroidism. His studies on vitamin D deficiency covered etiopathogenesis and gravity of the disorder across the population and his work was the first of its kind in India. His research revealed that vitamin D deficiency among Indian population is due to their dark skin (which prevented formation of vitamin D by blocking ultra violet rays) as well as inhibition of over-expression of Calcitriol receptor gene, resulting in inadequate bio-adaptation. He advocated against treating the nutritional deficiency through supplements and advised exposure to sunlight as a remedial measure. His work on idiopathic hypoparathyroidism assisted in widening the understanding of the disease with regard to its clinical signs such as parathyroid spondyloarthropathy, basal ganglia calcification and development of hyperphosphatemia. His studies have been documented by way of a number of articles (Note: Please see Selected bibliography section) of which many have been listed by online article repositories such as Google Scholar and ResearchGate. Besides, he has contributed chapters to books published by others and his work has drawn citations from other authors. He has also presented his research at medical forums including the National Symposium on Nutrition and Bone Health of Nutrition Foundation of India held in 2007. and serves as an editorial associate for the Annals of the National Academy of Medical Sciences (India).

== Awards and honors ==
The Council of Scientific and Industrial Research awarded Goswami the Shanti Swarup Bhatnagar Prize, one of the highest Indian science awards in 2008. The Indian Academy of Sciences elected him as a fellow the same year and he became an elected fellow of the National Academy of Sciences, India in 2010.

== Selected bibliography ==
- Chandan Jyoti Das, Ashu Seith, Shivanand Gamanagatti, Ravinder Goswami (2006). "Ectopic Pituitary Adenoma with an Empty Sella". American Journal of Roentgenology. 186 (5): 1468–1469. doi:10.2214/AJR.05.0329. PMID 16632746.
- Goswami R, Mishra SK, Kochupillai N (2008). "Prevalence & potential significance of vitamin D deficiency in Asian Indians". Indian J Med Res. 127 (3): 229–38. PMID 18497436.
- Ariachery C. Ammini, Saptarshi Bhattacharya, Jaya Praksh Sahoo, Jim Philip, Nikhil Tandon, Ravinder Goswami, Viveka P. Jyotsna, Rajesh Khadgawat, Sunil Chumber, Aashu Seth, Asis K. Karak, Bhawani S. Sharma, Poodipedi Sarat Chandra, Ashish Suri, Manish S. Sharma, Shashank S. Kale, Manmohan Singh (2011). "Cushing's disease: Results of treatment and factors affecting outcome". Hormones. 10 (3): 222–229. doi:10.14310/horm.2002.1312. PMID 22001133.
- Ravinder Goswami, Tabin Millo, Shruti Mishra, Madhuchhanda Das, Mansi Kapoor, Neeraj Tomar, Soma Saha, Tara Shankar Roy, Vishnubhatla Sreenivas (2014). "Expression of Osteogenic Molecules in the Caudate Nucleus and Gray Matter and Their Potential Relevance for Basal Ganglia Calcification in Hypoparathyroidism". J Clin Endocrinol Metab. 99 (5): 1741–1748. doi:10.1210/jc.2013-3863. PMC 5393477. PMID 24552219.
- Sagar Modi, Majari Tripathy, Soma Saha, Ravinder Goswami (2014). "Seizures in patients with idiopathic hypoparathyroidism: Effect of antiepileptic drug withdrawal on recurrence of seizures and serum calcium control". Eur J Endocrinol. 170 (5): 777–83. doi:10.1530/EJE-14-0075. PMID 24648439.
- Abilash Nair, Randeep Guleria, Devasenathipathy Kandasamy, Raju Sharma, Nikhil Tandon, Urvashi B. Singh, Ravinder Goswami (2016). "Prevalence of pulmonary tuberculosis in young adult patients with Type 1 diabetes mellitus in India". Multidiscip Respir Med. 11 (22): 22. doi:10.1186/s40248-016-0058-z. PMC 4862037. PMID 27168934.
- Soma Saha, Savita Saini, Govind K. Makharia, Siddhartha Datta Gupta, Ravinder Goswami (2016). "Prevalence of coeliac disease in idiopathic hypoparathyroidism and effect of gluten-free diet on calcaemic control". Clinical Endocrinology. 84 (4): 578–586. doi:10.1111/cen.12850. PMID 26147910. S2CID 8985003.

== See also ==
- Diabetes mellitus type 1
- Cushing's disease
- Fahr's syndrome
- Coeliac disease
