= Shrikant Khandalkar =

Shrikant Khandalkar was a lawyer known for filing public interest litigation in India. He died Sunday 29 November 2015.

On Sunday 29 November 2015 Khandalkar was found dead. Police determined that the death was a suicide. His body was injured after falling 8 stories from a window. He held a suicide note which explained that he had serious health problems. The lack of proper lighting in the courthouse was named as an explanation for why no one noticed the danger. The Hitavada reported that he was alive for some hours before he was able to go to the hospital, where he died. Khandalkar had been in conflict with various organizations over lawsuits, and this may have contributed to his poor condition. Nagpur Today described the death as mysterious.

In 2019 a group of lawyers requested a probe into the deaths of Khandalkar, Brijgopal Harkishan Loya, and retired judge Prakash Thombre. These three were legal colleagues and all died in strange ways.

Congress politician Kapil Sibal stated his opinion that Khandalkar was murdered.

Khandalkar helped to expose the Maharashtra Irrigation Scam.

In 2011 Khandalkar represented university faculty who called for review of the appointment of university chancellors.

In 2013 Khandalkar praised the Government of Maharashtra for committing to establish the Maharashtra National Law University, Nagpur. Previously Khandalkar had filed public interest litigation advocating for this. Also in 2013 in Nagpur, Khandalkar filed for investigation about the sale of public land to a private real estate development company.
