= Ishrat Jahan encounter killing =

Extra-judicial killing by police in Gujarat, India

The bodies of the four people killed in the encounter, 15 June 2004

On 15 June 2004, officers of the Ahmedabad Police Crime Branch and members of the Subsidiary Intelligence Bureau (SIB) of Ahmedabad shot and killed four people. Those killed in the incident were Ishrat Jahan Raza, a 19-year-old woman from Mumbra, Maharashtra, and Javed Ghulam Sheikh (born Pranesh Pillai), along with two Pakistani infiltrators Amjad Ali Rana and Zeeshan Johar. The Indian Central Bureau of Investigation (CBI) made allegations about the entire operation being an instance of "encounter killing". The state agencies and police claimed that Ishrat Jahan and her associates were Lashkar-e-Taiba (LeT) operatives involved in a plot to assassinate the Former Chief Minister of Gujarat, Narendra Modi.

After the incident, an investigation was launched based on allegations that the description of the incident by the police was false and the killings were deliberate and unlawful. The police team involved in the incident had been led by DIG D.G. Vanjara, an officer who spent eight years in jail for his alleged involvement in the extrajudicial killing of another person, Sohrabuddin Sheikh. Five years later, in 2009, an Ahmedabad Metropolitan court ruled that the encounter was staged. The decision was challenged by the state government and taken to the Gujarat High Court. After further investigation, in 2011, a Special Investigation Team (SIT) told the High Court that the encounter was not genuine, and the victims were killed prior to the date of the staged encounter. On 3 July 2013, the CBI filed its first chargesheet in an Ahmedabad court saying that the shooting was a staged encounter carried out in cold blood.

Although the question of whether the killings were an illegal staged event or not is separate from whether the people who were killed were working for the LeT, the family of Ishrat Jahan and several politicians and activists have maintained that she was innocent, and that question has continued to be disputed. The CBI declared that the encounter was staged, but did not comment on whether Ishrat Jahan was an LeT associate or not.

In 2004, the Lahore-based publication Ghazwa Times quoted someone from Jamaat-ud-Dawah, the political arm of the LeT, as saying that Ishrat and her companions were LeT "activists". However, in 2007, Jamaat-ud-Dawa retracted the statement as a "journalistic mistake" and offered an apology to Ishrat's family. No explanation was given as to why the previous statement was retracted after three years. In 2010, some media outlets reported that the convicted terrorist David Headley had implicated Ishrat in terrorist activities in a statement given to the National Investigation Agency (NIA). The NIA called these reports "baseless", and the CBI said that this assertion was fabricated by the IPS officer Rajendra Kumar, who is one of the suspects in the case. In June 2013, the Intelligence Bureau chief Asif Ibrahim told the Office of the Prime Minister and the Home Minister of India that the Bureau had enough evidence to prove that Ishrat was a part of an LeT module which planned to kill Narendra Modi and the former Deputy Prime Minister of India, Lal Krishna Advani. In February 2016, Headley testified before a Mumbai court, via video from the US, that Ishrat Jahan was a member of Laskhar-e-Taiba.

== The people killed in the incident ==
Amjad Ali Rana

Amjad Ali Rana, also known as Amjadali Akbarali Rana, Akbar or Salim, was according to Indian sources from Haveli Deewan (Haveli Diwan) village in the Bhalwal Tehsil of Pakistan. However, a later report by the metropolitan magistrate SP Tamang stated Rana's identity card, along with that of suspect Zeeshan, was forged by the police and the two men were Indian citizens. According to the CBI chargesheet, he told the Gujarat Police that he was planning to commit a terrorist act in Ahmedabad. The CBI also said that he was abducted by the Gujarat Police and IB officials from Gota on the outskirts of Ahmedabad. He was found dead with an AK-56 rifle near his body, which according to CBI, was planted by the police officials. Amjad is believed to have met Javed several times in Oman, and also Javed and Ishrat in Ibrahimpur once.

Ishrat Jahan Raza

Ishrat Jahan Raza (1985 – 15 June 2004) was a second year Bachelor of Science student at Mumbai's Guru Nanak Khalsa College. She was the second of seven siblings. Her lower-middle-class family, hailing from Bihar, lived in the Rashid compound in the Muslim-dominated area of Mumbra, Maharashtra. Ishrat's father, Mohammad Shamim Raza, had been the proprietor of a Mumbai-based construction company called Asian Constructions and her mother Shamima worked for a long time at a medicine packaging company in Vashi. However, her father died two years before the incident. To cover expenses after her father's death, Ishrat worked as a private tutor for children and did embroidery work to support her family. She also worked for Javed Sheikh (né Pranesh Pillai) as a secretary handling his accounts. Javed used to take her out of town at times on work.

David Headley, who conspired with the Lashkar-e-Taiba in plotting the 2008 Mumbai attacks, later said during FBI interrogation that Ishrat Jahan was a "Fidayeen" (sacrificial aspirant) working for someone named Muzammil Bhat (or Muzammil Butt). Headley also said during interrogation by the NIA that she had been targeting the Chief Minister of Gujarat, Mr. Narendra Modi, and was working with Lashkar-e-Taiba (LeT).

In March 2016, Headley claimed he had told NIA that about Jahan among other things, but could not say why they weren't recorded by the agency. However, he went back on part of his statement that LeT chief Zakiur Rehman Lakhvi had told him that "Ishrat Jahan module" was a botched operation, adding that he had no personal knowledge about her. He also stated that he learned about her from the media.

Javed Ghulam Sheikh (born Pranesh Pillai)

Pranesh Pillai, later known as Javed Ghulam Sheikh, was the son of Gopinatha Pillai, a native of Noornad in Kerala. He had married in 1994 and had three children. He had migrated to Mumbra in Mumbai after marrying. Before his death, he had been booked for four assault cases in Mumbai and Pune, and had also been charged with involvement in a fake currency racket. Pranesh Pillai converted to Islam and changed his name in 1991 to Javed Sheikh to marry a Muslim woman called Sajida. Gujarat Police recovered two passports from Javed: one obtained using his original name Pranesh and a second one in his new name.

Jahan's family first met Javed Sheikh two months before her death. He had taken Ishrat to Nasik, Bangalore and Lucknow, where he is believed to have met Amjad. Javed Sheikh travelled to Dubai in 2003 and to Oman in 2004. His wife Sajida said he came back indoctrinated from 2003 Dubai visit.

Zeeshan Johar

Zeeshan Johar (variously spelt Jisan Johar, Jishan Johar), also known as Abdul Ghani or Janbaaz, belonged to Gujranwala in Pakistan. Johar had reportedly been arrested in a trespassing case in Srinagar in 2003, along with Amjad. No one claimed the bodies of Amjad and Zeeshan after their death. An identity card with a Pakistan address was reportedly recovered from Zeeshan Johar's body. However, a later report by the metropolitan magistrate SP Tamang stated that identity cards were forged by the police and the two men were Indian citizens.

== The accused officers ==
Police officers accused in the case included Deputy Commissioner of Police Dhananjay G. Vanzara and Assistant Commissioner of the Police Crime Branch Girish Laxman Singhal. SIB officers accused in the case include Special Director Rajinder Kumar, Assistant Director M. K. Sinha, Deputy Superintendent of Police Rajeev Wankhede, and officer T. Mittal.

== The encounter ==
In February 2004, J&K Police had shot dead Ehsan Illahi, an LeT terrorist. The IB-led operation that followed, gathered intelligence about Javed Sheikh's plans and lured him to Ahmedabad where Gujarat Police awaited the arrival of his car.

Jahan had left her house on 11 June 2004, four days before she was killed. According to her brother, their mother Shameema did not like her going out of town with Javed. Therefore, she did not inform her mother when she left for Nashik. Jahan made a phone call to her mother on 11 June and spoke with her. According to her mother, she had called from a public phone booth outside a Nashik bus stop, and told her that "Uncle Javed Sheikh hasn't come yet." Jahan's mother said that a few minutes later, Jahan made a second call and said in a terrified voice that Javed had come but with some "strange men", and then hung abruptly.

On 15 June 2004, the Gujarat police stated that Ishrat, along with three other people, had been gunned down near Ahmedabad by a police team belonging to the Detection of Crime Branch (DCB) of the Ahmedabad City Police. The four were allegedly killed after the police chased their blue Tata Indica car. It is not clear how the four wound up in Gujarat from Maharashtra.

The police claimed that all four were connected with the Pakistan-based terror group LeT and were in Gujarat to assassinate Narendra Modi, in order to avenge the communal riots of 2002 in which more than 1000 people were killed. The police team was led by then Deputy Commissioner of Police Dhananjay G. Vanzara, who was later jailed for involvement in the Sohrabuddin Sheikh encounter killing.

== Allegations ==
On 15 July 2004, news outlets such as The Indian Express, The Times of India, Rediff.com, and Outlook carried news reports that "the Lahore-based Ghazwa Times, mouthpiece of the Lashkar-e-Taiba" had acknowledged Ishrat Jahan as a Lashkar-e-Taiba operative. According to these news reports, the Ghazwa Times had published an article on the "Jamat-ul-Dawa" [sic] website stating that "the veil of Ishrat Jahan, a woman activist of LeT, was removed by Indian police and her body was kept with other mujahideens (terrorists) on the ground", and that "Ishrat was with her husband, sitting on the front seat of the car". In June 2007, the Business Standard reported that the "global terror group Lashkar-e-Taiyba" had apologised to Indian Muslims on 2 May 2007 on the Jamaat-ud-Dawah's website "for causing them problems due to an inadvertent mistake", with the article implying that mistake in question was the claim that "Ishrat Jehan Reza had been a Lashkar operative".

The media reports were subsequently used by the Government of India in its 2009 affidavit as evidence of Ishrat Jahan's links with the Lashkar-e-Taiba.

Between July 2004 and August 2004, the website of the Jamaat-ud-Dawah carried a notice disclaiming knowledge of "the young girl Ishrat Jahan Araa" (sic), claiming that the Indian media had fabricated news about Ishrat Jahan's links to the Lashkar-e-Taiba. On 2 May 2007, Abdullah Muntazir, spokesperson of the Jamaat-ud-Dawah Pakistan, apologised to Ishrat Jahan's family and to all Indian Muslims for the journalistic mistake by his staff of quoting Indian news sites without proper attribution, which had enabled Indian media to claim that Ishrat Jahan had been a Lashkar-e-Taiba operative. He claimed the Jamaat-ud-Dawah had "published a vehement denial", but that the "damage had already been done".

A probe into the encounter was ordered after Ishrat Jahan's family insisted she was innocent. The Mumbai police said she had no criminal background and their investigation did not find anything that could implicate her. A number of politicians and the Maharashtra State Minorities Commission demanded an inquiry. Ishrat Jahan's funeral procession was attended by over 10,000 people in Mumbra and the Samajwadi Party state president Abu Azmi said that he would demand a CBI probe into the killings.

The Gujarat government had faced strong criticism by human rights groups for anti-Muslim human rights violations following the communal riots of 2002. During this period, there had been several police encounter deaths in Gujarat, three attributed to attempts to kill Narendra Modi in retaliation for the alleged involvement of the state machinery in the riots. Some human rights activists have alleged that many of these alleged encounters actually happen in police custody. They claimed that there is a pattern that many of these encounters followed: they always took place in the wee hours of the morning in a deserted area, with no witnesses; a vigorous exchange of fire resulted in the deaths of all the terrorists, while the police received no injuries; and the diary of the accused was often recovered, and contained incriminating evidence.

According to People's Union for Civil Liberties, the Gujarat police did not follow normal procedures in their investigations. No FIR was lodged with the local area police station where the encounter occurred, no charge sheet, no inquest report, and no witness statement. No bullet marks or damage was observed on the road or surrounding area.

=== Tamang report ===
The report by the Metropolitan Magistrate S. P. Tamang submitted in the metropolitan court Ahmedabad on 7 September 2009 said the four persons were killed in police custody. It implicated a number of top police officials for the deaths, which were allegedly staged in order to win promotions and rewards.

The Ahmedabad Metropolitan court ruled that the killing of Ishrat Jehan was a fake encounter, and Ishrat's family stated that she was not connected with LeT at all. A petition led the high court to constitute a police team, headed by Additional Director General of Police (ADGP) Pramod Kumar to look into the incident.

In the 243-page report, Tamang named the "encounter specialist" of the Gujarat police, the then head of the DCB, D.G. Vanzara, among others, as the accused in the "cold-blooded murder" of Ishrat Jahan and three others.

Claiming that the police officers were motivated by their personal interests in getting promotions and appreciation from the Chief Minister, Tamang included a list of top police officers, whom he held responsible. It includes Vanzara and his then deputy Narendra K. Amin, both of whom were already arrested in the Sohrabuddin encounter killing case. The list also included K.R. Kaushik, who was then the Ahmedabad Police Commissioner, P.P. Pandey, who was then the chief of the Crime Branch, and another alleged encounter specialist Tarun Barot.

The Gujarat High Court stayed the Tamang report on 9 September 2009 but gave liberty to Ishrat Jahan's mother to produce the report before the three-member committee constituted by the High Court to investigate the encounter. Justice Kalpesh Javheri said the observations made in the report were beyond the jurisdiction of the judicial magistrate. The Division Bench directed the Registrar-General of the High Court to institute a departmental inquiry into the conduct of Mr. Tamang in holding a parallel inquiry into the encounter, when the High Court was already seized of the matter, and submitting the report without its permission.

== Further investigation ==
The Gujarat State Government challenged the report of the metropolitan magistrate, saying that the policemen accused of faking the encounter were not given an opportunity to present their side of the arguments. Gujarat government's petition in the High Court against the Tamang report said it should be scrapped as it was "illegal and doubtful".

In July 2010, some media outlets reported that the LeT terrorist David Headley involved in the 26/11 Mumbai terror attacks had named Ishrat as a member of LeT. However, in a letter to the Gujarat High Court, the NIA clarified that these media reports were false and David Headly did not speak about Ishrat Jahan. IB has alleged that the original NIA report did have excerpts detailing Headley's account about Ishrat's links with LeT: these two paragraphs were later deleted.

The Gujarat High Court in August 2010 held that the motive described by magistrate SP Tamang in his inquiry report on the Ishrat Jahan encounter case cannot be accepted and also raised doubts on the magistrate's conclusion about the time of death of the four.

A Special Investigation Team (SIT), headed by Karnail Singh, was set up to probe the case further. The SIT sent four teams to Srinagar, Delhi, Lucknow and Nashik to probe Ishrat's alleged terrorist links. The team's forensic and ballistic experts, reconstructed the events of the encounter. Karnail Singh appointed a team headed by Professor T D Dogra and Dr. Rajinder Singh, Director CFSL Delhi to help reconstruction of scene of occurrence.

On 21 November 2011, the SIT told the Gujarat High Court that the Ishrat Jahan encounter was not genuine. After the SIT filed its report, the High Court ordered that a complaint under Indian Penal Code Section 302 (murder) has to be filed against those involved in the fake encounter, in which over 20 policemen, including senior IPS officers, were involved.

The CBI began investigations in the case with the help of Gujarat IPS officer Satish Verma. The CBI in their investigations had for the first time tightened its noose against a top cop in any encounter case, PP Pandey. PP Pandey had plotted Ishrat's encounter with the Central IB official Rajendra Kumar.

== Arrests ==
After somewhat more than a year, on 21 February 2013 CBI arrested Gujarat IPS officer G. L. Singhal who was then Assistant Commissioner of the Police Crime Branch at the time of the incident, in connection with the alleged fake encounter. The CBI in its FIR alleged that Singhal, now Superintendent of Police at State Crime Records Bureau played an active role in the encounter which was later found to be fake by the Special Investigation Team (SIT) constituted by the Gujarat High Court. Besides Singhal, CBI had previously arrested senior police officers, Tarun Barot, J. G. Parmar, N. K. Amin, Bharat Patel and Anaju Chaudhary. After the mandatory 90 days for the CBI to file its chargesheet in the case (which it failed to do), all the accused were released on bail, except Amin. A CBI court, issued an arrest warrant for another accused Additional DGP (Crime) P. P. Pandey, who is absconding, though he has filed an appeal in the Supreme Court to get the FIR cancelled.

On 4 June, suspended IPS officer D. G. Vanzara was arrested by the CBI, from Sabarmati Central Jail in Ahmedabad, after he was transferred a day ago from a Mumbai Jail since 2007, where he was lodged as he is an accused in Sohrabuddin Shaikh encounter killing case of 2005 as well as Tulsi Prajapati encounter killing case. CBI alleged that he led the team of Detection of Crime Branch (DCB), Ahmedabad, on whose tip off the Ahmedabad Police went ahead with the encounter, and wanted to interrogate him further. The following day, an Ahmedabad court remanded Vanzara to CBI custody till 10 June.

The CBI expressed the desire to arrest Rajendra Kumar but Intelligence Bureau chief Asif Ibrahim opposed it on many occasions, drawing the ire of CBI.

The CBI was able to arrest Rajendra Kumar in 2016 but he was granted bail by the court.

== 2013 developments ==
In June 2013, India Today reported that Asif Ibrahim, the chief of the Intelligence Bureau (IB), had told the Prime Minister's Office and the Home Minister that the IB had "enough evidence" to prove that Ishrat Jahan belonged to an LeT module which planned to kill Narendra Modi and Lal Krishna Advani. India Today reported Ibrahim as telling the Government that David Coleman Headley had revealed this in his interrogation by the FBI.

The United States Federal Bureau of Investigation had told the Indian Ministry of Home Affairs about Headley's claims on a "female suicide bomber named Ishrat Jahaan". In a note on 13 October 2010, the NIA had said that Headley had told them Ishrat Jehan had been part of a "botched" operation run by the terrorist group.

=== Headlines Today report ===
On 13 June 2013, Headlines Today, an English news channel and subsidiary of India Today group, revealed that Gujarat Chief Minister Narendra Modi and senior Bharatiya Janata Party (BJP) leader L.K. Advani were among the leaders who were on the hit-list of the alleged terrorists killed in an encounter with Gujarat Police in Ahmedabad on 15 June 2004. It also claimed that Ishrat Jahan was among the terrorists assigned to execute the plot. It released unsubstantiated audio tapes of the conversation of allegedly a LET commander and Javed Sheikh, a man killed in the encounter. The news channel also produced the letter of IB chief to CBI director, in which he said that David Headley also revealed that Ishrat Jahan was an LeT operative. However, Headley's confession to the FBI had already been dismissed as hearsay by the NIA

On 14 June, the leaked tapes were produced as evidence before the Gujarat High Court by the counsel for the Gujarat Government, Tushar Mehta. However, the bench refused to consider them as evidence, asking Mehta to take them to CBI for investigation.

A group of social activists alleged that the IB was selectively leaking tapes to the media in order to scuttle the CBI probe just 24 hours ahead of the scheduled hearing of the case in the Gujarat High Court. They also criticized the media for airing the telephone calls without any forensic tests or voice tests.

=== Tehelka report ===
In June 2013, Tehelka magazine published an exposé that revealed that the CBI had in its possession an audio recording of a conversation between Gujarat's former Minister of State Praful Khoda Patel, senior IAS officer G. C. Murmu, and other top officials in a meeting called to chalk out a plan to safeguard the interests of the officers whose names could crop up in the investigation. The conversation was secretly recorded by a meeting attendee, Girish Laxman Singhal, one of the two accused police officers who had been arrested by the CBI in the case.

=== Resignation of Vanzara ===
On 1 September 2013, Senior Gujarat Police Officer D G Vanzara said he had resigned from IPS and blamed a lack of interest shown by the state government in rescuing him and other police officers jailed in police encounter cases. He sent his resignation from Sabarmati Jail, but his resignation was refused. He retired in 2014 while still in jail and was released on bail in 2015 after nearly eight months of imprisonment.

== 2014 developments ==
=== 2014 CBI report ===
In May 2014, CBI filed a report before a special court in Ahmedabad that it did not have prosecutable evidence against former Gujarat Minister Amit Shah.

== 2016 developments ==
Allegations against an unnamed congress politician by one of the accused officers. In February 2016, one of the officers accused in the case, former Intelligence Bureau Special Director Rajinder Kumar, said he was pressured and offered "allurements" to implicate the then Gujarat Chief Minister Narendra Modi in the case in an attempt to defame Modi. He said there was a conspiracy against Modi led by a senior Congress leader from Gujarat. Later in March 2016, R. V. S. Mani, former under secretary (Internal Security) in the Ministry of Home Affairs, who signed the two affadavits in the case, alleged that "he was ordered to sign on the second affidavit", and that SIT chief Satish Verma tortured him with cigarette stubs during his examination in 2013. He alledged that it was fake encounter and then UPA government wanted to implicate Gujarat intelligence officers.

== See also ==
- Death of Sohrabuddin Sheikh
- Encounter killings by police
