= P. P. Pandey =

Indian police officer

P.P. Pandey is a police officer in India. He was Director general of police (DGP) in Gujarat.

Pandey was Joint Commissioner of Police in Ahmedabad when during the 2004 Ishrat Jahan case there were police encounters resulting in death. The Central Bureau of Investigation made an early determination that the deaths were undue and that there was some fault in the police. From April to August 2013 Pandey was away from public view. In August the Gujarat government suspended him from his post and jailed him. In February 2015 Pandey got bail after having been in jail for 18 months. A few days after getting bail the government revoked his suspension and returned him to service.

In April 2016 Panday was appointed as Gujarat DGP. In April 2017 Pandey stepped down from his post as DGP to avoid being removed. Geetha Johri replaced him in this position.

In February 2018 the CBI discharged Pandey from the Ishrat Jahan case saying that there was no evidence to blame him.

In December 2019 the Gujarat government felicitated Pandey along with other police officers in an award ceremony.
