= Karthik Nagesh =

Indian neonatologist

Dr. Karthik Nagesh
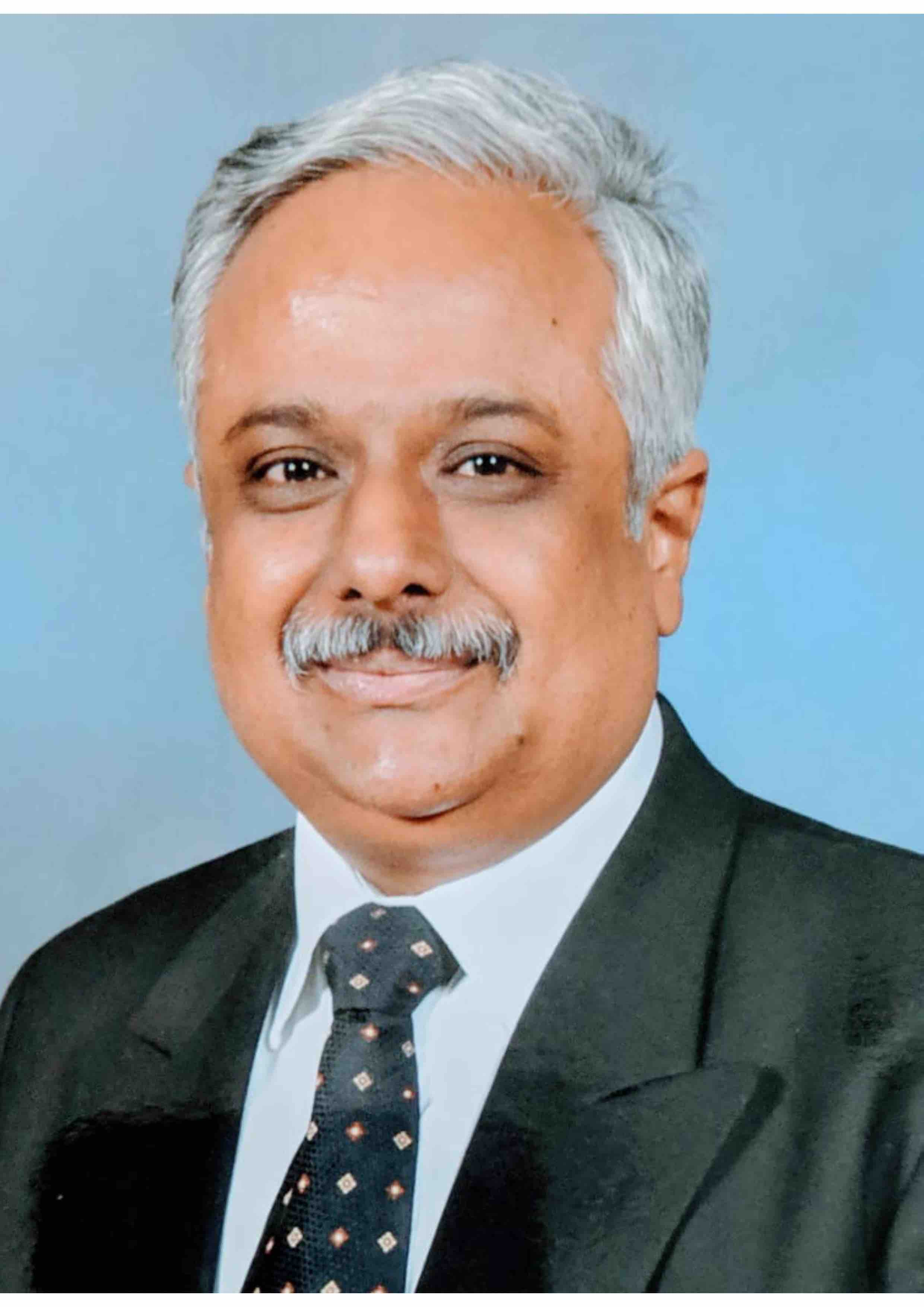

Dr. Karthik Nagesh is a neonatologist in India. He has been practicing neonatal intensive care since 1992 at the Manipal Hospital in Bangalore. He is well known in India for his pioneering work in intensive care for sick neonates especially, Surfactant Therapy and ventilation for sick babies with respiratory distress. He is currently the Chairman of the Manipal Advanced Children's Center and Chairman and HOD of Neonatology and Neonatal ICUs at the Manipal Hospitals Group as well as an adjunct professor of paediatrics, KMC at Manipal University.

== Background ==
Nagesh is a neonatologist working at Manipal Hospital Bangalore. He completed his M.B.B.S at the Maulana Azad Medical College, University of Delhi and trained in paediatrics at PGIMER Chandigarh. He then worked at Safdarjung Hospital in Delhi and at AIIMS before moving to the United Kingdom.

== Career ==
Nagesh pursued his training in Neonatal Intensive Care at Queen Charlotte and Chelsea Hospitals in London, and at the Hope Hospital, University of Manchester School of Medicine.

Nagesh returned to India in 1992, to set up one of the first tertiary level care Neonatal Intensive Care Units in India. He is well known for having set up a ‘state of the art NICU’ at Manipal Hospital, Bangalore with the reputation of providing high quality intensive care to the sickest of small neonates ethically. He was the Head of Paediatrics at Manipal Hospital from 2001 to 2004 and later has been the Head of Neonatology. He then turned his focus to promoting Paediatric Research in priority areas relevant to India and to pursue education in neonatology more actively amongst paediatricians. He is the Founder and Managing Trustee of the ‘Foundation for Newborns’, a trust which does charity work for sick babies and promotes newborn health. He was President of the National Neonatology Forum ( Karnataka, India) from 2001 to 2003. He was nominated to be the President of the Indian Academy of Paediatrics, Bangalore for the year 2010. He was conferred the Fellowship award of the National Neonatology Forum of India (2013) for lifetime service in the field of neonatology. Recently Bestowed with the prestigious FIAP (Fellowship award of the Indian Academy of Pediatrics) in 2020 for lifetime contribution to Child Health.

More than 20,000 neonates have been treated by him and his dedicated team of doctors and nurses these last 28 years. Many of his sickest and smallest patients are now themselves highly accomplished intelligent adults excelling in various professions. They have launched a unique initiative to help the cause of Premature babies on ‘World Prematurity day’-The ex-Preemies Club.

He has received the prestigious Fellowship of The Royal College of Paediatricians and Child Health, London (FRCPCH) for his contributions in the field of neonatology and paediatrics.

== Appointments ==
- Chairman, Manipal Advanced Children's Center, Manipal Hospitals, Bangalore
- Chairman and HOD of Neonatology and Neonatal ICUs, Manipal Hospitals Group, India
- Organizing Chairman 12th Annual conference of Indian Academy of Pediatrics (Neonatology chapter) - IAPNeocon 2019
- Member, REACH (Royal College of Paediatrics and Child Health), India Board
- Host Examiner(appointed by Royal College of Paediatrics and Child Health, UK), for MRCPCH Clinical Exams held for the first time in India, November 2011
- President, Indian Academy of Pediatrics, Bangalore Branch.2010.
- Appointed MRCPCH Examinations ‘Coordinator’ for Bangalore, India - by the Royal College of Paediatrics and Child Health, UK ( in association with IAP ), 2010
- Chairman – ‘National Task Force on Newborn Screening Guidelines’, National Neonatology Forum of India, (NNF), 2009.
- President- National Neonatology Forum of India (NNF)-(Karnataka State Chapter), (2001–2003).
- Secretary- National Neonatology Forum of India (Karnataka State Chapter). (1999–2001).
- Appointed the "National Convenor-Neonatal Network Initiative of India", NNF, 2009
- Co-Chairman, Scientific Committee, Indian Academy of Paediatrics’ Annual National Convention, PEDICON, 2009.
- Inspector for Institutional Accreditation in Neonatology (DNB). (2008–09) by National Board of Examinations, New Delhi, India.
- Invited by UNICEF and Sri Lankan Perinatal Society to conduct Neonatal Ventilation Workshop in Sri Lanka (2008). Recently Invited by the Sri Lanka College of Paediatricians to give a Guest Lecture on "Newer advances in Surfactant therapy for RDS in newborns" at their annual congress in Colombo (2010).
- Associate editor, Journal of Neonatology, (Indexed publication of the National Neonatology Forum of India), 2007 -08.
- Guest editor, Journal of Neonatology, 2006
- Member – National Editorial Advisory Board. Journal of Neonatology. (2001–2003), (2005–2006).
- Principal investigator, The "first Indian Multicenter Research Trial" on determining the role of GM-CSF in Neonatal Sepsis. (1997–2000).
- Inspector and Examiner in Paediatrics, National Board of Examinations. (2005–2009).
- Neonatal Advanced Life Support (NALS ) Instructor and Faculty.
- Reviewer for the indexed Journals-Indian Pediatrics, Pediatrics (AAP) Indian Jl of Pediatrics and Jl of Neonatology.
- Nominated as Executive Board Member, National Neonatology Forum, India, 2021.

== Achievements ==
- Conferred the prestigious Fellowship of the 'Indian Academy of Pediatrics' (FIAP) for lifetime contribution to Child Health, 2020.
- Reviewer for ‘Current Practice Guidelines’ of National Neonatology Forum of India, 2019
- Awarded the "Healthcare achiever - Legend" award by Times of India 2019.
- Awarded the Oration (Dr Nagaraj Rao Oration) and delivered the same at the prestigious National Conference of Neonatology ( NNF NEOCON 2019), Dec 2019
- Organized the well acclaimed and Prestigious conference in Neonatology, the ‘IAPNEOCON 2019’ in Bangalore as Chairman. This was attended by 19 International faculty and nearly 700 Delegates and the conference focused on ‘ Advancing Frontiers of Neonatal Medicine’
- Awarded the ‘Lifetime Achievement Award’ by the National Neonatology Forum-Karnataka State Chapter,2019.
- Awarded the Oration award, National Neonatology Forum, Karnataka 2016
- Awarded the Fellowship of the National Neonatology Forum for Lifetime service in the field of Neonatology, 2013.
- Awarded the 6th "Dr.G.K.Devarajulu Memorial Endowment Oration Award" by the GKNM Hospital, Coimbatore, India. (1999)
- Has carried out one of the first "Air Transports for sick Neonates" in India.
- First Pediatrician to successfully use Surfactant therapy in Neonatal RDS in India
- Awarded the "Dr.V.Balagopal Raju Award" by the Indian Academy of Pediatrics for the best research paper in Child health. (1988)
- Awarded the "Dr.Satya Gupta Endowment Prize" for the best research paper in Pediatrics by the IAP Delhi. (1987)
- Awarded ‘Best Student’ prize in Anatomy, Forensic Medicine, Internal Medicine and General Surgery during M.B.B.S. (1977–1982).
- Conducted statewide Newborn Health initiatives and the ‘Newborn Week’ Celebration drives in collaboration with the UNICEF, NNF.

== Research achievements ==
- Conducted and coordinated, the first ever Pan-Indian Multicenter research trial in Paediatrics across twelve neonatal units in India.
- First published Indian work on "Surfactant Replacement therapy in Neonatal RDS" in India. (Indian Paediatrics, Aug.1994).
- Conducted a trial on a "Probiotic in Diarrhoea".(2008)
- Conducted a PMS study on a new Natural Surfactant for use in Preterm Neonates with RDS ( 2007–2008)
- Conducted a multi-centre double blind randomized controlled trial on a 13-valent Pneumococcal vaccine vs. 7-valent Pneumococcal vaccine for establishing safety and efficacy. (2007–2009)

== Publications ==
- About 82 publications / abstracts.
- 17 Chapters in books.
- About 380 oral presentations at various conventions.
- Recently authored a book on ‘ Lessons in Neonatal Respiratory care – An evidence based approach’, Noble Publishers, 2020
- Keeping babies warm: a non-inferiority trial of a conductive thermal mattress - Bhat SR, Meng NF, Kumar K, Karthik Nagesh N, Kawale A, Bhutani V; Archives of Disease in Childhood Fetal and Neonatal Edition 2015;100:F309-F312.
- Oral Paracetamol for closure of PDA in seklected preterm neonates - Mohanty PK, Karthik Nagesh N, Razak A, Indian Pediatrics;2016, Feb,53(2):171-2
- Current Status of Neonatal Intensive Care in India - Karthik Nagesh N, Razak A. Arch Dis Child Fetal Neonatal Ed, 2016;0:F1–F5.
- Interpretation of the Blood Gas - Karthik Nagesh N, Abdul Razak, Mrinal Pillai., The Handbook of Neonatology, Indian Journal of Pediatrics; 2018;Chapter 37,356-67
