= Sukhwinder Singh Bhatti =

Indian defense attorney (c. 1951–1994)

Sukhwinder Bhatti
- Born: Sukhwinder Singh Bhatti
- Disappeared: 12 May 1994
- Status: Missing for 32 years, 4 months and 19 days

Sukhwinder Singh Bhatti (c. 1951– c. 1994) was a criminal defense attorney in Sangrur district of Punjab, India, and the district's leading defense lawyer for individuals accused of crimes under the Terrorist and Disruptive Activities (Prevention) Act (TADA). TADA was a law in effect from 1985 to 1995 that authorized the preventative detention of persons for up to two years in Punjab based only on suspicion of certain crimes done with the intent to cause terror. The law also established in camera courts, and under Section 21, detainees charged with certain crimes were presumed guilty until proven innocent.

== Human rights and the Punjab police ==
Mr. Bhatti also represented victims of human rights abuses perpetrated by the Punjab police. In particular, Mr. Bhatti defended against a new strategy used by the police starting in 1993: a production warrant would be applied for and received, which would allow them to remove individuals accused in TADA cases from jail, whereupon police would kill them in "fake encounters." Mr. Bhatti argued that "fake encounter" was a euphemism for extrajudicial executions. He filed writ petitions in the High Court and secured orders preventing the Superintendent of Jail from allowing his clients to be removed from jail without the permission of the High Court.

== Disappearance ==
Mr. Bhatti was denied an Indian passport in 1993 after senior police officials wrote to the Regional Passport Office that he was defending terrorists and securing their release from courts. On 12 May 1994, a week after telling his mother that he was being threatened by senior police officials in Sangrur, Mr. Bhatti was taken into custody near Kunra Police Post in front of several witnesses. Over the course of the next month, other detainees saw Mr. Bhatti in bad condition at various detention centers in the area, and alleged that he had been tortured. After around 10 June, Mr. Bhatti was never again seen alive.

== Investigation of disappearance ==
At the time of his disappearance, Mr. Bhatti was around 43 years old and was working on 131 TADA cases. After a public interest litigation was filed in the High Court concerning Mr. Bhatti's abduction, the High Court of Punjab and Haryana ordered the Central Bureau of Investigation (CBI) to investigate his disappearance. However, in March 1997, the CBI inquiry concluded that the location of Mr. Bhatti could not be determined nor liability for his disappearance established. Though the CBI report describes extensive evidence indicating police responsibility for the disappearance, they concluded that the case be closed as untraced. The High Court subsequently dismissed the case.

Though another case was initiated before the Supreme Court in 1994, the inquiry ordered into the disappearance of Mr. Bhatti by the Court has proceeded in an irregular fashion, and no action has been taken by the Court since April 2004.

Sukhwinder Singh Bhatti's case is one of many disappearances that have been communicated to the UN Working Group on Enforced and Involuntary Disappearances by various human rights organizations over the past several years. The Working Group, formed in 1980, has dealt with thousands of such cases in several countries.

Sukhwinder Singh Bhatti was one of several human rights lawyers and activists who were allegedly murdered or disappeared by Punjab police. Others include Jaswant Singh Khalra, Ranbir Singh Mansahia, Jagwinder Singh, and Kulwant Singh (along with his family). A protection order for Punjab human rights lawyers was even secured in a court case in 1994.

== See also ==
- Human rights in India
- Jaswant Singh Khalra
- List of people who disappeared mysteriously: post-1970
- Police encounter
- Punjab human rights
