= Maulana Azad Medical College =

Medical College in Delhi, India

Maulana Azad Medical College and Associated Hospitals
- Motto in English: Immortality of Mortals by Cure
- Type: Public
- Established: 1958; 68 years ago
- Affiliations: National Medical Commission
- Academic affiliations: University of Delhi
- Budget: ₹917.05 crore (US$95 million) (FY 2023)
- Dean: Dr. Munisha Agarwal
- Faculty: 426
- Undergraduates: 1248
- Postgraduates: 711
- Doctoral students: 1
- Location: Bahadur Shah Zafar Marg, Central Delhi, Delhi, India
- Campus: 122 acres (49 ha); Urban
- Website: mamc.delhi.gov.in

Maulana Azad Medical College (MAMC) is a public medical college in Central Delhi, India, affiliated to the University of Delhi. It is named after Indian freedom fighter and first education minister of India Maulana Abul Kalam Azad. It was established in 1958 at Bahadur Shah Zafar Marg near Delhi Gate.

Four hospitals attached to MAMC have a combined bed strength of 2800 beds and cater to millions in Delhi alone and many more from the surrounding states in north India. The college is a tertiary care referral centre and has teaching programs for graduate and postgraduate degrees and residency and subspecialities/fellowships (referred to as superspecialities in India).

== History ==
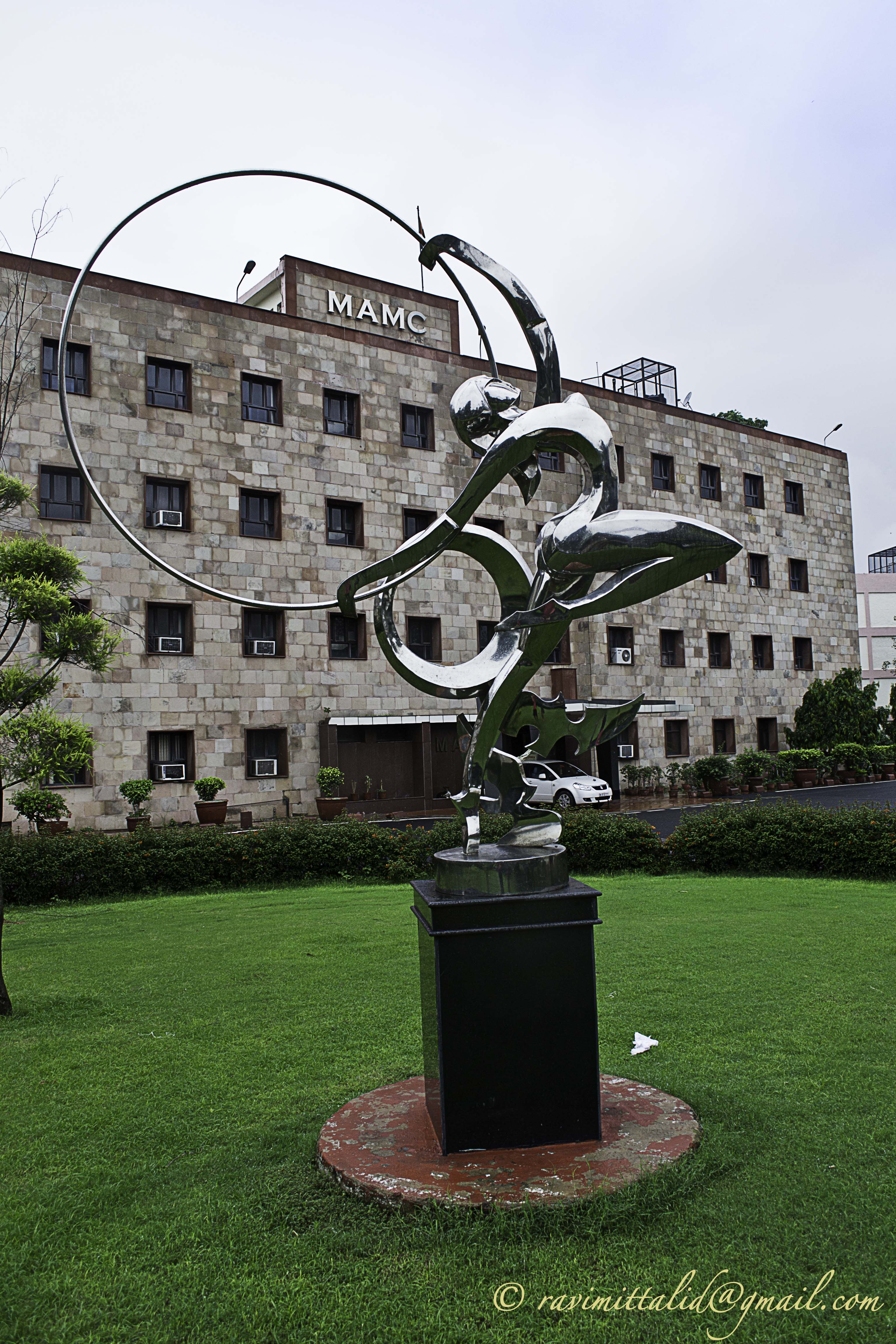
MAMC main building.

The history of Maulana Azad Medical College can be traced to 1936, when India was under British rule. During that time, Indian Medical Service was heavily staffed by the British. In 1940, Martin Melvin Curickshank of the Indian Medical Service (IMS) was appointed Medical Superintendent of Irwin Hospital and Chief Medical Officer of Delhi. He was appointed specifically to establish a medical college complex near Ramlila Maidan. But before his plans could come to fruition, the Second World War started in 1939 and the plan of a new medical college had to be dropped. Later on in 1958 MAMC made a very humble beginning at the erstwhile Irwin Hospital (now the Lok Nayak Hospital). The foundation stone for the new buildings of the college was laid in October 1959 by Govind Ballabh Pant at the 30-acre land of the old Central Jail which was not in use.

== Courses offered ==
Four hospitals – Lok Nayak Jay Prakash Hospital, GB Pant Institute of Postgraduate Medical Education & Research, Maulana Azad Institute of Dental Sciences and Guru Nanak Eye Centre – are situated in the college campus and attached to the college. These make available 2800 beds, 7200 daily outpatient attendance and 47 operation theatres for the patients and for the medical students to learn. It caters to 290 undergraduate students, 245 post graduate and post doctoral students per year being trained by 426 faculty members and 810 resident doctors.

The medical college offers MBBS, BDS and MD and MS degrees and postgraduate residency courses for super-speciality / sub-specialty fellowship degrees of MCh and DM. Institutes offering degrees in nursing and pharmacy are also attached to the college. There are more than 30 courses being offered in MAMC in the Medical Stream. Govind Ballabh Pant Institute of Postgraduate Medical Education and Research, a sister institute, located within the camps provides courses in super specialties and basic subjects. Post Doctoral courses in Pediatric surgery and Neonatology are available at MAMC. Post Doctoral courses in other specialties like GI Surgery, Cardiology etc. are available at GB Pant Hospital.

== Rankings ==
University and college rankings

Medical – India
- NIRF (2024): 24
- India Today (2024): 5
- Outlook India (2024): 8

In 2024, MAMC Delhi was ranked 24th among medical colleges in India by the National Institutional Ranking Framework, 8th by Outlook India among government medical colleges, and 5th among all medical colleges by India Today.

== Notable people ==
=== Alumni ===
- Ravi Kannan R, surgical oncologist. Director of Cachar Cancer Hospital and Research Centre (CCHRC), Silchar. Recipient of Padma Shri, Mahaveer Award and Ramon Magsaysay Award
- Ravinder Goswami, Shanti Swarup Bhatnagar laureate
- Upendra Kaul, an interventional cardiologist and the winner of a Dr. B. C. Roy Award and Padma Shri
- Kamal Kumar Sethi, former professor and Padma Shri recipient
- Karthik Nagesh, neonatologist
- Kshama Metre, pediatrician and rural development official
- Brijendra Kumar Rao, Padma Bhushan in 2009, former chairman of Sir Ganga Ram Hospital, Delhi and member of Medical Council of India
- Vipul Aggarwal, Indian civil servant

=== Faculty ===
- S. I. Padmavati, former Director of MAMC, Padma Vibhushan awardee
- Prem Chandra Dhanda, former principal and Padma Bhushan awardee

== Heritage sites ==
The college was established at the 30-acre land of the old Central Jail which was no longer in use after the establishment of Tihar Jail at far away Tihar village on the fringe of Delhi. The old Central Jail main building is still within the premises of the college and is listed as a heritage site. The grave of the Mughal era poet Momin lies near the parking area near the college. The infamous Khooni Darwaza where Bahadur Shah Zafar's two sons and a grandson were shot by the British in September 1857 during the Indian Rebellion of 1857 is opposite the main entrance of the college.

== See also ==
- Lok Nayak Hospital
