= Abdullah Muntazir =

Abdullah Muntazir is an expert on Islamic militancy based in Islamabad, Pakistan. In 1997, he started his journalistic career as a special correspondent for Daily Ausaf, an Islamabad-based Urdu newspaper published in Muzaffarabad, the capital of Azad Jammu and Kashmir. He also worked for Daily Asas (another Islamabad-based Urdu newspaper) as a correspondent from Muzaffarabad for a short period of time.

He is founder editor of Weekly Ghazwah, an Urdu newspaper once run by the Islamic charity and proselytization/preaching organization Jamaat-ud-Dawah, accused of being the front group for prime suspects of the 2008 Mumbai attacks. This newspaper was banned in December 2008 when the Government of Pakistan outlawed Jamaat-ud-Dawah, complying with the United Nations Security Council’s Taliban and Al Qaeda Sanction Committee’s decision to proscribe the charity. The charity has challenged the Security Council ban, claiming that the allegations are baseless, and has filed an appeal for delisting.

Muntazir had also served as Jamaat-ud-Dawah’s spokesman for international media, from 2005 to January 2009, but when the Jamaat-ud-Dawah was outlawed in Pakistan he left the charity in early 2009 to resume his journalistic career.

He has continued to work with independent media. He worked as in-charge discussion forum Daily Khabrain Lahore (2003), and was a sub-editor for Daily Pakistan Lahore (2002) and Daily Khabrain Lahore (2003). In the past ten years, he contributed many articles on national, international, social and religious issues for different Urdu and English newspapers.

In 2012, the United States Department of the Treasury applied sanctions against Abdullah Muntazir, prohibiting US persons from engaging in transactions with him. He has challenged treasury department sanctions and his case is under review.
