= Dinesh MN =

Indian police officer from Karnataka

Dinesh M.N
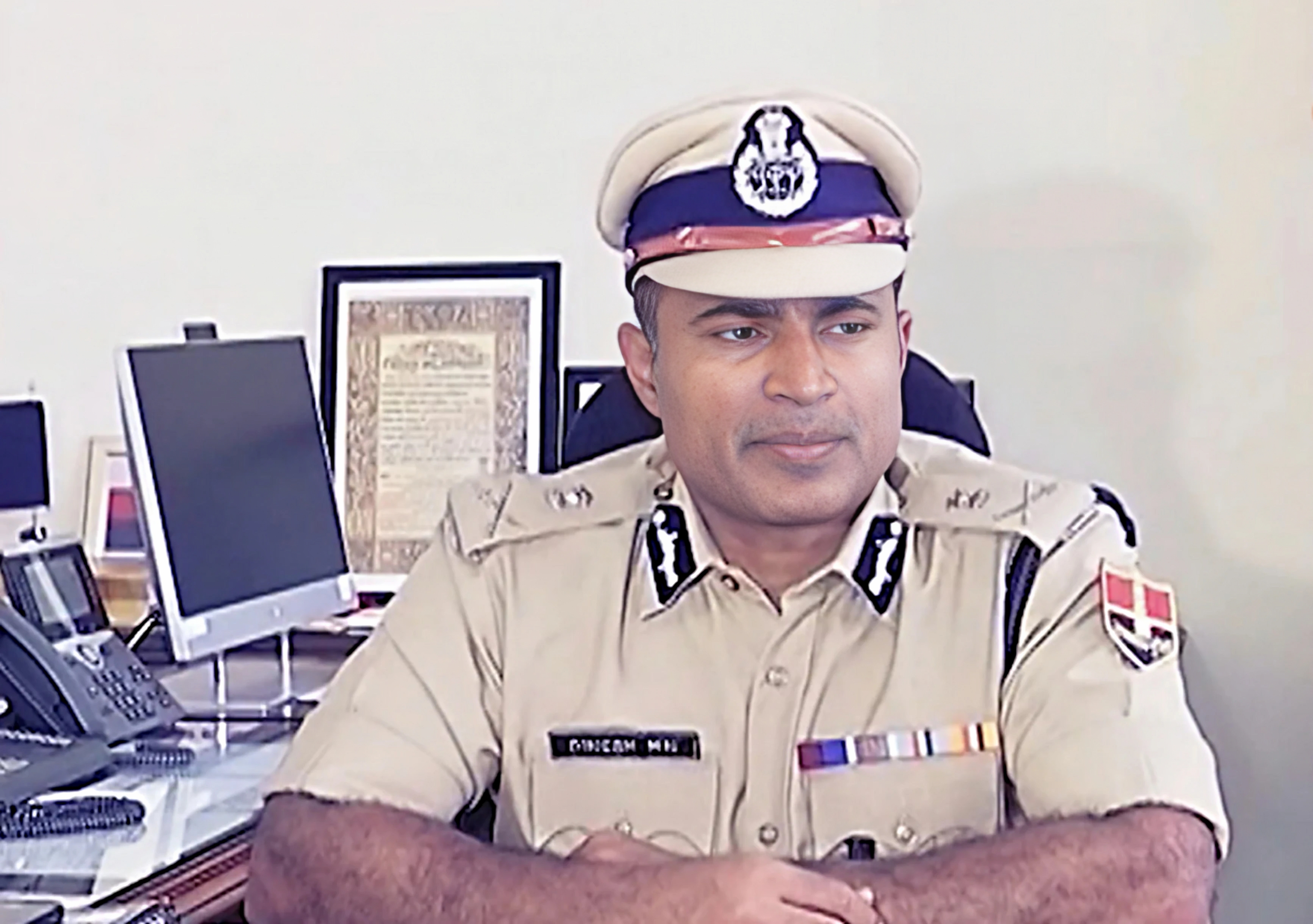
- Dinesh MN joined as ADG Crime
- Born: 6 September 1971 (age 55); Munaganahalli, Chikkaballapur, Karnataka
- Spouse: K. Vijaylakshmi
- Police career
- Department: ADG of ATS and Anti-Gangster Task Force (AGTF) Jaipur
- Rank: Additional Director General of Police

Munaganahalli Narayanaswamy Dinesh (6 September 1971), better known as Dinesh M.N, is a 1995 batch Indian Police Service officer of Rajasthan cadre. He is currently serving as Additional Director General of Police of Crime Department in Rajasthan. Known for his integrity and tough stance against corruption and crime, Dinesh has led anti-corruption operations.

He gained prominence for his role in uncovering a major corruption racket in the mining department and neutralizing notorious criminal networks, such as the Anand Pal Singh gang. Despite facing a seven-year imprisonment in the controversial Sohrabuddin-Tulsiram Prajapati encounter case, he was acquitted in 2017.

== Early life and education ==
IPS Dinesh MN was born on 6 September 1971 in Munaganahalli, Chintamani Taluka of Chikkaballapur district, Karnataka, India. His father was a Tehsildar in Bangalore, and his mother was a homemaker. IPS Dinesh MN completed his BE degree from BDT College of Engineering, Davanagrre in Electronics and Communications branch in 1993.

== Career ==
Dinesh is a 1995 batch Indian Police Service officer of the Rajasthan Cadre and serving as Additional Director General of Police in Anti Corruption Bureau, Rajasthan. He hails from Karnataka state. He served seven years in jail in the Sohrabuddin- Tulsiram Prajapati encounter cases.

After his release in May 2014, he led ACB Rajasthan as IG to unearth major corruption racket in Mining department leading to arrest of 1983 batch IAS Officer Ashok Singhvi who was working as Mines Secretary. Also under his supervision as IG SOG Rajasthan, dreaded gangster Anand Pal Singh carrying a reward of 5 lakhs was killed in an Encounter with SOG and Police Teams in June 2017 and his gang was neutralised.
