= 2009 Dehradun encounter case =

The Ranbir Singh fake encounter case is an ongoing criminal case in the Uttarakhand state of India, took place on 3 July 2009, and involved fake encounter killings of Ranbir Singh, a 22-year-old MBA graduate in Dehradun. Delhi court has convicted 17 officers of the Uttarakhand Police for killing in a 2009 fake encounter that had rocked the hill state. This is the highest number of police personnel to be convicted in a fake encounter case in India.

== Detail ==
Ranbir Singh was a 22-year-old MBA graduate from Ghaziabad, who went to Dehradun on 3 July 2009 to take up a job. Where, he caught with his friends at Mohini Road in Dehradun and allegedly trying to commit a crime by Uttarakhand Police. According to Ranbir's father Ravindra Singh his son had been shot 22 times by the police. Police later held a press conference where they claimed to have murdered a gangster who escaped into the forest after snatching the revolver of a policeman who stopped his bike at a checkpost.

== CBI enquiry and conviction ==
The 18 cops had been chargesheeted by the CBI in December 2009. On 9 June 2014, all guilty policemen had been sentenced for life imprisonment. Earlier on 6 June 2014 court had found seven of them guilty for murder, 10 of them for criminal conspiracy and kidnapping to murder and another one was convicted only for destruction of evidence. On 6 February 2018 the Hon'ble Delhi High Court in appeal confirmed life sentence of 7 policemen out of 17 which were originally given life sentence by trial court.
