= Geetha Johri =

Indian police officer

Geetha Johri is a retired officer of the Indian Police Service. She was the first woman from Gujarat to become an IPS officer. Johri retired as Gujarat’s police chief and was the highest ranked women officer in the state. She became DGP in 2017, replacing PP Pandey.

Johri was the original investigator of the death of Sohrabuddin Sheikh.

Jorhi graduated in the 1982 batch.

In 1992 she raided the Dariapur hideout of criminal Abdul Latif. Latif escaped, but she arrested his gunman Sharif Khan.

In 1998 she came into political conflict which resulted in her loss of opportunity.

She was the investigator of the 2002 Gujarat riots.
