= Lok Nayak Hospital =

Geography
- Location: Jawaharlal Nehru Marg, near Delhi Gate, Central Delhi, Delhi, India
- Coordinates: 28.63°N 77.23°E

Organisation
- Care system: Government of Delhi
- Affiliated university: Maulana Azad Medical College

Services
- Emergency department: Yes
- Beds: 1600

History
- Former name: Irwin Hospital
- Opened: 1936

Links
- Website: lnjp.delhi.gov.in
- Lists: Hospitals in India

Lok Nayak Hospital (Hindi: लोक नायक अस्पताल), formerly known as Irwin Hospital and later as Lok Nayak Jai Prakash Narayan Hospital (LNJP), is a government teaching and tertiary-care hospital in New Delhi, India. Located near Delhi Gate, it is run by the Health and Family Welfare Department of the Government of Delhi. Established in 1936 during the British Raj, it developed into one of the largest public hospitals in northern India following the Partition of India in 1947.

The hospital has played an important role in the development of medical education in Delhi, as Maulana Azad Medical College (MAMC) began in the hospital block of the then Irwin Hospital in 1958, before the construction of its own main building. Even today Lok Nayak Hospital remains one of its principal teaching hospitals. Its name changed to Lok Nayak Jaya Prakash Hospital (LNJP) till November 1977 in the honour of Jayaprakash Narayan, Indian independence activist and politician.

== History ==
The history of Lok Nayak Hospital traces back to British India when the Central Jail Complex was converted into a hospital under the then Viceroy of India Lord Irwin. Its foundation stone was laid on 10 January 1930 and under Lt. Col. Cruickshank in 1936 this Central Jail Complex was commissioned to Irwin Hospital. At that time, it was a 350-bed hospital, but after the 1947 independence of India, experienced a significant increase in demand for more beds as there was an influx of population in the form of refugees from neighbouring countries and states.

In November 1977, Irwin Hospital's name was changed to Lok Nayak Jaya Prakash Hospital, and again in 1989, the name was shortened from Lok Nayak Jaya Prakash Hospital to Lok Nayak Hospital.

Parts of the original hospital complex were subsequently replaced by modern buildings, while the former administrative building has been retained as a heritage structure.

== Medical facilities ==
- Aids Counseling Clinic
- Anesthesiology
- Blood Bank
- Burns & Plastic Surgery
- ENT
- Family Welfare (M &F) Infertility
- Gynae & Obstetrics
- Medicine
- Neurosurgery
- Orthopedics
- Pediatrics
- Pediatrics (Surgery)
- Skin & STD
- Surgery
- Trauma Services
- Various Diagnostic Labs
- Kidney

== See also ==
- Maulana Azad Medical College
