= Ilol State =

Taluka in Mahi Kantha, British India

Ilol was a fourth-class princely state and taluka in Mahi Kantha, British India which in 1880 consisted of 15 villages across 7,500 acres (30 km^{2}; 11.7 mi^{2}). In 1872, its population was 5511 people; in 1881, its population was 5603 people.
