= Brijgopal Harkishan Loya =

Indian judge (1966 - 2014)

- Born: 12 December 1966; Gategaon, Latur
- Died: 1 December 2014 (aged 47)
- Occupation: Judge

Special Judge to the Central Bureau of Investigation
- In office June 2014 – December 2014
- Preceded by: J. T. Utpat
- Succeeded by: M. B. Gosavi

Brijgopal Harkishan Loya (12 December 1966 – 1 December 2014) was an Indian judge who served in a special court which deals with matters relating to the Central Bureau of Investigation (CBI). He was presiding over the Sohrabuddin Sheikh case, and died on 1 December 2014 in Nagpur. A bench of the Supreme Court of India, headed by the Chief Justice of India Dipak Misra, on April 19, 2018, dismissed the public interest petition (PIL), and stated the death to be natural and such petitions to be an attack on the Judiciary.

== History ==
In June 2014, Loya was appointed to the special CBI court on the Sohrabuddin Sheikh case, after a previous judge, J. T. Utpat, was removed from the court. Unlike his predecessor, Loya allowed Amit Shah, the national leader of the Bharatiya Janata Party (BJP) who had been accused of ordering the murder of Sohrabuddin Sheikh, to be exempt from appearing at the court in person, until the framing of charges, except when Shah was already in the state of Maharashtra, where the case was being litigated. When Shah failed to attend a hearing on 31 October, even though he was in the same city, Loya ordered Shah's lawyers to ensure that he would be present at hearings when he was in the state, and set the date of the next hearing to 15 December, when the verdict would be given.

Loya travelled to Nagpur to attend a wedding of a colleague's daughter on 30 November 2014. He stayed at Ravi Bhavan, a state government guest house in Nagpur. On the morning of 1 December 2014, at around 4am IST, he developed chest pain and was taken to two hospitals. He died at 6.15am of cardiac arrest. His body was taken to Latur by a family friend. Loya's family claimed that they had seen blood stains on Loya's shirt collar. Medical experts disagreed over whether this was a result of the post-mortem examination. On 30 December 2014, Loya's successor in the special CBI court, M. B. Gosavi, dismissed all charges against Shah in the Sohrabuddin Sheikh case, and ruled that he need not stand trial.

== Controversy over death ==
=== Report by Caravan Magazine ===
Justice Loya died in 2014, but the issue rose to limelight after Caravan Magazine published an interview with Loya's family on 20 November 2016, in which they raised concerns over his death. Loya's sister claimed that Justice Loya was under immense pressure from the then Chief Justice of the Bombay High Court, Mohit Shah. She even went on to allege that Justice Mohit Shah offered Justice Loya a 100 crore bribe to give a favorable verdict. The family also raised concerns over the medical reports of Justice Loya, leading to a PIL in the Supreme Court of India During a Press Conference, the Congress claimed that 2 other associates, with whom Justice Loya had shared the details of the case, died under mysterious circumstances as well. One of them, was lawyer activist Shrikant Khandalkar and another retired judge Prakash Thombre. Kapil Sibal of the Congress claimed that Khandalkar was thrown of a roof building in November 2015, while Thombre died “suspiciously while traveling in train from Nagpur to Bangalore on May 16, 2016, in Hyderabad” The Congress asked for an investigation by an independent SIT monitored by the Supreme Court of India, claiming that even the post mortem report was manipulated.

=== Press Conference by the 4 senior-most judges of the Supreme Court of India ===
On 12 January 2018, Justices Jasti Chelameswar, Ranjan Gogoi, Madan B. Lokur and Kurian Joseph, the second- to fifth-most senior judges of the Supreme Court, held a press conference, in which they warned that the integrity of the court was under threat, and accused Dipak Misra of allocating cases selectively, based on personal preference. This was because politically sensitive cases have traditionally been assigned to the most senior judges. Despite this, Dipak Misra, Chief Justice of India, assigned the Loya case to a junior member of the bench. This raised further allegations over the entire affair.

=== Press Conference by Justice Loya's son ===
On 14 January 2018, Loya's son Anuj said in a press conference that the family had no suspicions over Loya's death, clarifying that he had "had suspicions earlier but now it is over". The Loya family's lawyer Ameet Naik said that the press conference was held to dispel any doubt over Loya's death, and confirm that the family does not suspect that the death was the result of a conspiracy. Despite this, Shrinivas Loya, Loya's paternal uncle, argued that Anuj was under political pressure to not ask for a probe. Some even questioned the need of former Bombay High Court Chief Justice Manjula Chellur meeting Loya's son. As it happens, the press conference was called by Anuj Loya after his meeting with the former Chief Justice. Dushyant Dave, arguing for an independent probe into Loya's death, asked "Why would a chief justice of the high court call the boy and issue a statement, just days before retirement? Who was she trying to satisfy?”

=== Hearing in the Supreme Court ===
A public interest petition was filed in the Supreme Court of India, alleging that Loya was murdered. The court expressed concern, calling his death a "serious matter", and posted it for hearing on 15 January 2018.

Following the 4 judges' press conference, the "junior judge", Justice Arun Kumar Mishra took serious exception to the 4 judges' allegations, saying that they "attacked his reputation". In the presence of other judges, he reportedly said “The only thing I have earned in my life is reputation and you have tried to attack it... How do you propose to give it back to me? You should have killed me with a bullet rather than attacking my reputation.” Later, he recused from the case and requested the Chief Justice of India, Dipak Misra, to constitute another bench.

Later, Dr RK Sharma, the former head of the Forensic Medicine and Toxicology Department at the All India Institutes of Medical Sciences in Delhi, and the president of the Indian Association of Medico-Legal Experts for 22 years, ruled out heart attack as the reason for the death of Judge Loya. Caravan reported "According to Sharma, the documents show signs of possible trauma to the brain, and even possible poisoning" indirectly claiming the case to be physical Assault This prompted Senior Supreme Court advocate, Prashant Bhushan to file an intervention plea in the Supreme Court of India, which was allowed by the apex court.

The Supreme Court of India reserved its order on March 17, 2018. On April 19, Justice Dhananjaya Y. Chandrachud read the judgement. The court observed the death of Justice Loya to be natural. Dismissing the 2 petitions, Chandrachud called them a result of "political rivalry" and termed them "scandalous" and "frivolous". He also bashed the petitioners, accusing them of a "frontal attack on the independence of judiciary". He went on to say that the petitioners "forgot to maintain institutional civility towards judges and made wild allegations." He said that the bench had considered moving contempt proceedings against them, but "decided not to go ahead with it."

=== Reactions ===
The Congress called it a "It is a sad letter day in India's history," alleging that "the suspicious circumstances in which Loya died, was a matter of deep concern for those who have faith in the judiciary." The Bharatiya Janata Party, on the other hand, asked for Rahul Gandhi's apology, claiming that the "invisible hand" behind the petitions was that of Rahul Gandhi who tried to use the judiciary for "character assassination" of Amit Shah. Sambit Patra said that Rahul Gandhi should be "ashamed" for his "conspiracy to target Amit Shah, and Indian judiciary, and democracy."

Former Chief Justice of the Delhi High Court, Justice AP Shah, said that he hoped the verdict would've been "different."

The Congress, along with leaders of 7 other opposition parties, held press conference to declare their intention of introducing an impeachment motion against Dipak Misra, a first against a sitting Chief Justice of India in history. 71 members had signed the notice. However, 7 of them retired, leaving only 64. Despite that, its still above the minimum of 50 signatures required for introducing a motion of impeachment in the Rajya Sabha. While the Congress claimed it had to do nothing with the Loya verdict the previous day, Minister of Finance Arun Jaitley termed it a revenge petition for the Loya verdict. The Congress didn't seem united, as two former law ministers questioned the motion. Former Prime Minister Manmohan Singh and Former finance minister P. Chidambaram did not sign the notice. Despite this, the Congress submitted the notice to the Vice President of India Venkaiah Naidu.

After consulting legal experts, Venkaiah Naidu rejected the motion, saying that there was no “substantial and verifiable” evidence of wrongdoing. The Congress, however, said that he acted in haste. The Congress was considering moving to the Supreme Court against this.

=== Book on the case ===
Journalist Niranjan Takle wrote a book titled Who Killed Justice Loya which asks many questions regarding the inconsistencies of the case. Justice Loya was handling Soharabuddin encounter case wherein Amit Shah of BJP was an accused. Justice Loya could not complete trial of the case — not to speak of reaching to the stage of delivering the judgment — as he died suddenly of cardiac arrest.
