= D. G. Vanzara =

Former police officer in Gujarat, India

Dahyaji Gobarji Vanzara (D. G. Vanzara) is a former Inspector-General of Police (IG) of Gujarat, India. He was in judicial custody from 2007 until his bail in 2015 on charges of having conducted a series of extrajudicial killings, while heading the Anti-Terrorist Squad (ATS). He was discharged in the Sohrabuddin case in 2017.

Vanzara joined the Gujarat Police as DSP in 1980, was promoted to IPS officer in 1987, and retired on 31 May 2014 as Deputy IG. After being cleared in fake encounter cases in February 2020, he received a post-retirement promotion to IG, effective from 29 September 2007.

== Cases ==
An IPS officer of the 1987 batch, his tenure saw a spurt in encounter killings, including:

- Sameer Khan (shot dead September 2002)
- Sadiq Jamal (2003)
- Ishrat Jahan and three others (shot dead June 15, 2004)
- Sohrabuddin Sheikh (shot dead November 2005)
- Sheikh's wife Kausar Bi (killed in Vanzara's village)
- Tulsiram Prajapati (killed December 28, 2006)

As of September 2013, 32 officers—including six IPS officers—were jailed for these encounters.

In 2013, Vanzara stated:

The CID/CBI arrested my officers and me for allegedly fake encounters. If that is true, then the CBI investigating officers for all cases should also be arrested, as we, the field officers, simply implemented government policy.

Former DSP N. K. Amin testified in 2008 of a police-politician-criminal nexus in the Sohrabuddin case. High-level communications from Amit Shah to on-duty officers were questioned in court.

In the Prajapati case, the encounter occurred in Banaskantha district shortly after Vanzara’s transfer there. Shah could not recall the reason for the transfer. Shah was later indicted as the "kingpin and prime accused" in the Prajapati case.

Vanzara was released on bail on February 18, 2015. He was acquitted in the Sohrabuddin case in August 2017 due to lack of evidence.
