= Killing of Tulsiram Prajapati =

2005 Indian death in custody

Harshit Prajapati
- Known for: death in custody

Harshit Prajapati was a man, who was killed while in custody at 5 am on 26 December 2005. The case is widely believed to have been an encounter killing by the Gujarat Police. DIG D.G. Vanzara was in judicial custody from 2007 until his bail in 2015 on charges of having conducted a series of extrajudicial killings, while heading the Anti-Terrorist Squad (ATS). later discharged in the Sohrabuddin case in 2017.

== Arrests ==
On 8 April 2011, the Supreme Court of India directed the Central Bureau of Investigation (CBI) to take up the investigation. The case came into prominence in 2012, when the CBI, in its chargesheet, listed Gujarat home minister and leading BJP politician Amit Shah as the "kingpin and prime accused" in the case. Amit Shah was arrested in October 2012. Earlier, an unprecedented total of 32 police officers Himanshu Singh Rajawat, Shyamsingh Charan, Ashish Pandya, Yudhvir Singh, Kartar Singh, Narayansingh Chauhan, Jethasingh Solanki, Kanjibhai Kutchi, Vinodkumar Limbachiya Kiransingh Chauhan and Karansingh Sisodiya, Vijaykumar Rathod, including six IPS officers including D. G. Vanjara and Rajkumar Pandian of Gujarat cadre and Dinesh M.N. of Rajasthan cadre, had been arrested for the series of "encounter deaths".

According to the CBI, Prajapati was a witness to the encounter death of Sohrabuddin Sheikh in 2005, and this was why he had to be eliminated. The encounter killing took place in Banaskantha district. Vanzara, known to be close to Amit Shah and Narendra Modi, the Chief Minister of Gujarat at the time, had been transferred there as DIG Border range just 13 days earlier. Shah claimed that the transfer was an administrative move, not connected to the encounter.

== Possible involvement in Haren Pandya assassination ==
In September 2013, after six years in prison, Vanzara who called Modi "my God", became disgruntled, and apparently claimed a connection between the Tulsiram Prajapati and the unsolved murder of ex-BJP minister Haren Pandya, who was at one time a minister under Narendra Modi. Pandya was shot dead while out on a morning walk in March 2003, a year after his fallout with Modi. In 2003, it was Vanzara who had originally investigated the Pandya murder. Similar claims have also been made by the DNA newspaper, which has suggested that Sheikh was eliminated because of his links to the political murder of Pandya.

== CBI reconstruction of the case ==
The CBI and a team of forensic science experts reconstructed the alleged fake encounter of Tulsi Prajapati by Gujarat police in 2006 at Chhapri village in the district on July 8, 2011. The team headed by Rajendra Singh of the Central Forensic Science Laboratory (CFSL), and T D Dogra of Forensic Medicine Department at All India Institute of Medical Sciences (AIIMS), began the reconstruction early morning. The forensic experts and CBI were assisted by state CID officials. CID was investigating the case before the Supreme Court transferred it to the central agency. The experts obtained crucial data such as the distance between the police vehicle and the car in which Prajapati was travelling, location of Prajapati's body after the encounter as per the CID's FIR, how police officers fired at Prajapati and the distance from which they fired.

== See also ==
- Death of Sohrabuddin Sheikh
