= Encounter killing =

Term for extrajudicial killings by South Asian security forces

Encounter killings, often simply referred to as encounters, is a euphemism used in India and Pakistan to refer to extrajudicial killings by security forces. The officers typically described the incidents as a shootout situation, often allegedly starting when a criminal grabs for the gun of a police officer. The term encounter came into widespread use for such incidents in the late 20th century.

Critics are sceptical of the police motivation behind many of these reported incidents, and further complain that the wide acceptance of the practice has led to incidents of the police staging encounters to conceal the killing of suspects when they are either already in custody or are unarmed or have surrendered (or would have been willing to surrender if given the opportunity). Such instances are called fake encounters. In some cases, surrendered criminals are shot in the leg as an extrajudicial punishment; these are called half encounters.

Sometimes police officers are also killed in such incidents, although relatively rarely. Over a two-year period in Uttar Pradesh, for example, encounters reportedly resulted in the death of 103 alleged criminals and 5 police officers. Several individual police officers have reportedly been involved in more than 100 killings in encounters, and Inspector Pradeep Sharma of the Mumbai Police was reportedly involved in more than 300.

In the 1990s and the mid-2000s, the Mumbai Police used encounter killings to attack the city's underworld, and the practice spread to other large cities. In Pakistan, the Sindh Police are notorious for extrajudicial killings through fake encounters, especially in Karachi.

In the six years between 2016/2017 and 2021/2022, a case of encounter killing has been registered once every three days in India, with 813 such cases of encounter killings, according to National Human Rights Commission of India data. There were no convictions of any officials involved in these killings during that period.

== In India ==
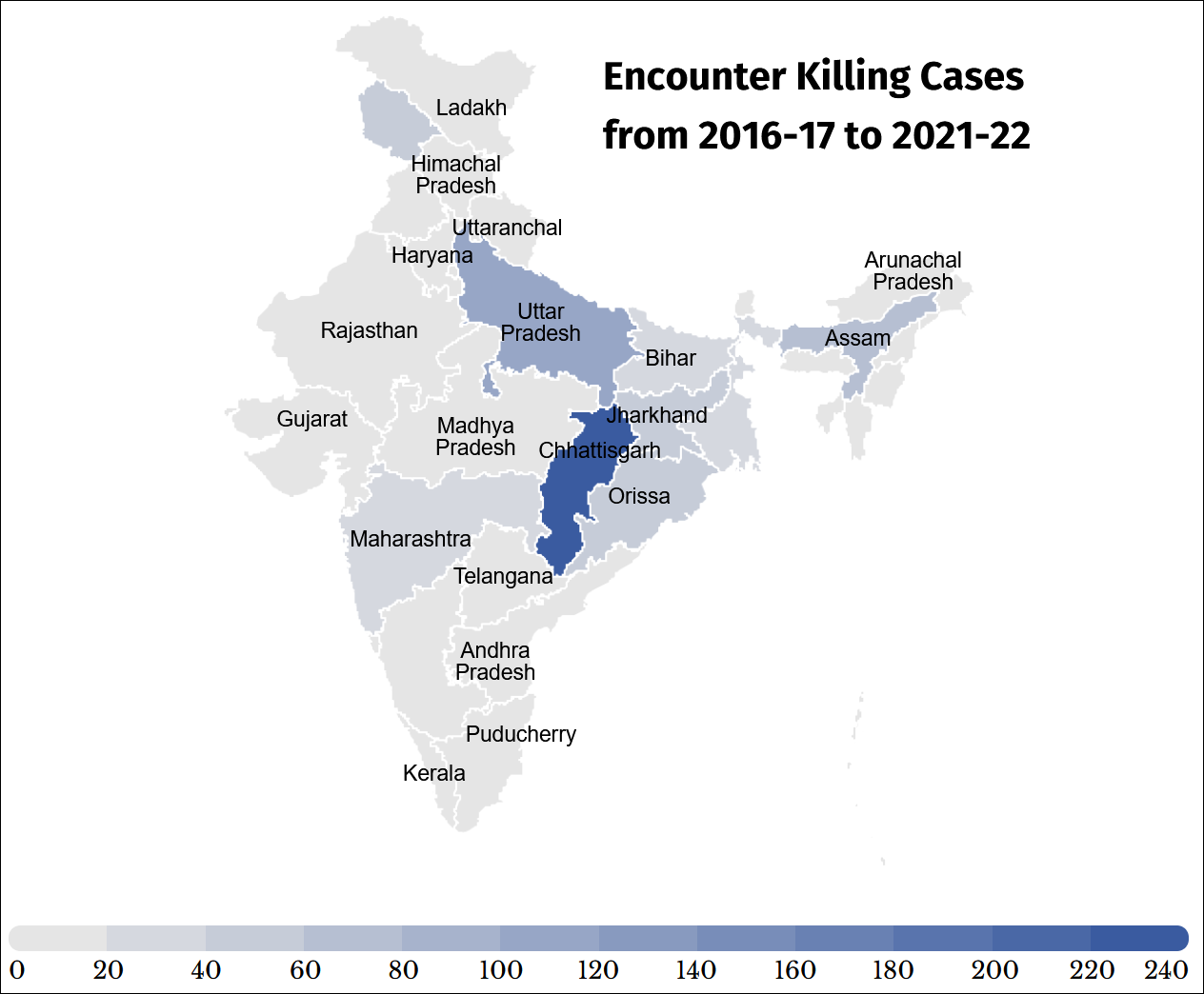
Encounter killings by state and union territory of India.

States. 2016–2022. Data for above map.
Andhra Pradesh	11
Arunachal Pradesh	14
Assam	79
Bihar	25
Chhattisgarh	259
Goa	0
Gujarat	2
Haryana	16
Himachal Pradesh	1
Jharkhand	52
Karnataka	6
Kerala	9
Madhya Pradesh	8
Maharashtra	33
Manipur	12
Meghalaya	18
Mizoram	0
Nagaland	1
Odisha	40
Punjab	8
Rajasthan	12
Sikkim	1
Tamil Nadu	11
Telangana	8
Tripura	3
Uttar Pradesh	110
Uttaranchal	1
West Bengal	21

Union territories. 2016–2022. Data for above map.
Andaman and Nicobar	1
Chandigarh	0
Dadra and Nagar Haveli	0
Daman and Diu	0
Delhi	9
Jammu and Kashmir	45
Ladakh	0
Lakshadweep	0
Puducherry	0

The term encounter killing came into popular use in India since the late 20th century following a very high frequency of such killings by police in cities including Mumbai, Chennai, Kolkata and Ghaziabad. Some of the killings have been controversial, and critics have alleged that the police created 'fake encounters' as opportunities to kill suspects.

According to the National Human Rights Commission (NHRC) of India, there were many cases of alleged fake encounters:

2002–2008

440 cases. States with high number of cases were: Uttar Pradesh (231), Rajasthan (33), Maharashtra (31), Delhi (26), Andhra Pradesh (22) and Uttarakhand (19).

October 2009 – February 2013

555 cases. States with high number of cases were: Uttar Pradesh (138), Manipur (62), Assam (52), West Bengal (35) and Jharkhand (30).

=== Andhra Pradesh ===
The first recorded encounter killing was Alluri Sitarama Raju, who was a local hero in the Rampa Rebellion of 1922. The police of Nizam of Hyderabad passed on some traditions of police execution to the state of Andhra Pradesh at independence in 1947. During the Telangana movement, the state government used encounter killing as the explanation for killing more than 3000 people. From the 1960s, the culture of using encounter killings has developed into a tolerated practice.

=== Maharashtra ===
On 11 January 1982, the gangster Manya Surve was shot dead by police officers Raja Tambat and Isaque Bagwan at the Wadala area. This is often referred to as the city's first recognised encounter killing. From that period until early 2003, the police killed 1,200 alleged criminals.

Members of the Mumbai Police involved in these killings became widely known as 'encounter specialists', and several became well known to the public in India, including:

Name	Designation	Encounter killings	Source	Note
Pradeep Sharma	Inspector	312		He once remarked "Criminals are filth and I'm the cleaner". He was accused of having staged the encounter of Ram Narayan Gupta alias Lakhan Bhaiyya and suspended in 2009–10; however, he was acquitted by the court in 2013.
Daya Nayak	Inspector	83		
Praful Bhosale	Inspector	77		
Ravindranath Angre	Inspector	54		
Sachin Waze	Assistant Inspector	63		Resigned from service, later joined Shiv Sena
Vijay Salaskar	Inspector	61		KIA in the 2008 Mumbai attacks

=== Punjab ===
The term 'police encounter' was used often during the Punjab insurgency between 1984 and 1995. During this time, Punjab police officials reported 'encounters' to local newspapers and to the family members of those killed. The victim was typically a person whom the police believed to be a freedom fighter or involved in the militant separatist movement; proof of alleged militant involvement was rarely given. Ultimately, the practice became so common that 'encounter' became synonymous with extrajudicial execution.

It is alleged that police typically take a suspected freedom fighter into custody without filing an arrest report. If the suspect dies during interrogation, security forces would deny ever taking the person into custody and instead claim that he was killed during an armed encounter, placing weapons on or near the body to suggest the police acted in self-defence.

Sukhwinder Singh Bhatti, a criminal defence attorney in Punjab who defended such suspects, disappeared in May 1994 and is alleged to have been killed by the police.

Jaswant Singh Khalra garnered global attention for his research concerning 25,000 illegal killings and cremations involving the Punjab police, and that the police had even killed about 2,000 police officers who refused to cooperate. On 6 September 1995, while he was washing his car in front of his house, Khalra was abducted by personnel of Punjab Police and taken to Jhabal Police Station. Although witnesses gave statements implicating the police, and named Director General of the Punjab Police, Kanwar Pal Singh Gill as a conspirator, police have denied ever arresting or detaining Khalra. Further, the police have claimed to have had no knowledge of his whereabouts.

The Ensaaf organization has mapped 5,298 enforced disappearances or extrajudicial executions in the state of Punjab in India, with the majority of cases occurring in the late 1980's and early 1990's.

=== Rajasthan ===
On 20 July 2020, a special Central Bureau of Investigation court in Mathura convicted 11 policemen, including former deputy Superintendent of Police Kan Singh Bhati in former MLA Raja Man Singh's murder case. Raja Man Singh was killed along with his two supporters in a fake police encounter in February 1985.

=== Gujarat ===
Between 2002 and 2006, 22 police encounter killings were reported in Gujarat. According to the NHRC figures, during 2002–2007, there were four alleged fake encounters in Gujarat (out of 440 fake encounters in all of India). These cases gained national media attention:

- Sadiq Jamal (2003)
- Ishrat Jahan case (2004)
- Sohrabuddin Sheikh case (2005)
- Tulsiram Prajapati case (2006)

=== Uttar Pradesh ===
Uttar Pradesh Chief Minister Yogi Adityanath was quoted saying that, "Criminals will be jailed or killed in encounters." Reacting to the statements, the National Human Rights Commission of India issued a notice to the state government over its reported endorsing of killings in encounters by police for improving law and order.

=== Other notable cases ===
Veerappan, the notorious forest brigand, was reportedly killed by the Special Task Force (STF) Headed by K Vijay Kumar in an encounter on 18 October 2004. Some human rights organisations claimed that the circumstantial evidence indicated that he was killed in a fake encounter after being tortured by the police.

On 19 September 2008, Delhi-police Inspector Mohan Chand Sharma, a decorated officer, and two suspects were killed in the Batla House encounter case in New Delhi. The encounter led to the arrest of two suspected Indian Mujahideen (IM) terrorists, while a third managed to escape. The Shahi Imam of the Jama Masjid termed the encounter as 'totally fake"' and accused the government of harassing Muslims. Several political parties and activists demanded a probe into the allegations that the encounter was fake. After an investigation, the National Human Rights Commission cleared the Delhi Police personnel of any violations of human rights. While sections of the media still oppose the ruling and believe the police to be culprits, a video clip that surfaced in 2016 featured a confession from the terrorist who had escaped the encounter, about how he managed to do so and later join the ISIS, further confirming the credibility of the encounter.

An alleged 'encounter' in 1991, led to the 2016 sentencing of 47 policemen to life imprisonment for the slaying of 11 Sikh pilgrims in the Pilibhit district of Uttar Pradesh.

In 2019, all four men accused in the 2019 Hyderabad gang rape were killed in a police encounter on 6 December 2019. Police alleged that one of four had gestured to the other three to flee after attacking the cops, that the four tried to run towards a deserted pathway, and that the cops opened fire in self-defense.

== In Pakistan ==
Annual reports by the Human Rights Commission of Pakistan (HRCP) documented at least 5,000 reported police encounter cases nationwide between 2010s and 2024, of which almost 2,000 occurred in Punjab.

2015

Human Rights Watch (HRW) reported that in 2015, 2,108 men, seven women, and six minors were killed in Pakistan in alleged police encounters, including 696 people in the city of Karachi alone. Of these, 1191 men and three women were killed in the province of Punjab, 829 men and one woman were killed in Sindh, 64 men and one woman were killed in Khyber Pakhtunkhwa, 22 men and two women were killed in Balochistan, and two men were killed in Gilgit-Baltistan. According to HRW, many of the encounters were "faked and did not occur in situations in which lives were at risk." HRW added: "In the vast majority of these cases, no police officer was injured or killed, raising questions as to whether there was in fact an armed exchange in which there was an imminent threat to the lives of police or others."

January 2014 – May 2018

A total of 3,345 people, including 23 women and 12 minors, were killed in 2,117 alleged police encounters in Pakistan from 1 January 2014, to 11 May 2018, according to the HRCP. 55 police officials and 10 passersby were also killed in the encounters. Most of the alleged police encounter cases occurred in the Punjab province (1,036 cases) followed by the Sindh province (944 cases), whereas most of the killings in the alleged police encounters occurred in Sindh (1,592 killings) followed by Punjab (1,556 killings). The encounter cases and killings were reported to be much lower in Khyber Pakhtunkhwa (71 killings in 54 cases) and Balochistan (57 killings in 34 cases) during the period.

Since the data collected by HRCP was based on monitoring of media reports, the total number of cases and killings may be higher than the estimate.

=== Sindh ===
On 13 January 2018, Naqeebullah Mehsud was killed in a fake encounter staged by the senior superintendent of police (SSP) Rao Anwar in Karachi, sparking countrywide protests against extrajudicial killings.

=== Punjab ===
Human Rights Commission of Pakistan Director Farah Zia stated in 2026 that Punjab was historically the site where encounter killings first emerged in the 1960s, attributing this in part to an entrenched policing culture marked by impunity for torture. In comments to Al Jazeera, a former senior Punjab police official linked the rise in encounter killings to a strained and corrupt justice system and political pressure to curb crime, saying these factors fostered frustration and the justification of extrajudicial measures.

A Lahore-based family had been travelling to a family member's wedding in a car driven by their neighbour on 19 January 2019. They were shot down near Sahiwal toll plaza.

=== Other notable cases ===
On 16 January 2018, when the inquiry against Rao Anwar was about to start following the extrajudicial killing of Naqeebullah Mehsud, Rao Anwar claimed that he came under attack in Karachi's Malir Cantonment while he was heading towards his house. He alleged that a suicide attacker detonated explosives near him and his squad but they remained unhurt, and that two accomplices of the attacker then opened fire on the police, both of whom were shot dead in the exchange of fire. He also alleged that a few militants escaped the site under the cover of fire while the police and Pakistan Rangers were conducting search operation. However, the Counter-Terrorism Department (CTD) probing the case doubted if a suicide attack had even taken place at the site. The investigators found out that contrary to Rao Anwar's claim, no exchange of fire had taken place. They termed the incident a fake encounter. According to the investigators, the alleged suicide attacker Gul Saeed was first riddled by the police with bullets, then a suicide vest was wrapped around his body, and then the vest was set on fire which burned his body.

In 2025, officers from Pakistan’s Crime Control Department reportedly raided the home of Zubaida Bibi in Bahawalpur, Punjab, detaining her sons and seizing valuables. Within 24 hours, five male members of her family, three sons aged 25, 23 and 18 and two sons in law, were killed in separate police "encounters" in different districts of the province. According to accounts given to the HRCP, Zubaida said the family sought their release but were later informed of their deaths and alleged that police threatened relatives after she filed a legal petition. Her husband stated that the men had no criminal records.

== In popular culture ==
Police encounters have been featured in several fiction and non-fiction arts.

=== Film ===
- Aan: Men at Work (2004)
- Ab Tak Chhappan (2004) and its sequel, Ab Tak Chhappan 2 (2015), both starring Nana Patekar
- Bardaasht (2004)
- Batla House (2019), based on encounter of suspected terrorists in Delhi
- Christopher (film)
- Encounter: The Killing (2003), starring Naseeruddin Shah
- HIT: The Second Case (2022)
- Kaakha Kaakha, a 2003 Tamil film starring Surya
- Kagaar (2003)
- Khakee (2003), starring Amitabh Bachchan and Ajay Devgan
- Yuddham Sei, a 2011 Tamil film starring Cheran
- Maximum (2012), starring Sonu Sood, Naseeruddin Shah, Vinay Pathak, Mohan Agashe
- Mayanadi (2017)
- Paayum Puli (2015), a Tamil film starring Vishal
- Rege, a Marathi film (2014) starring Mahesh Manjrekar as Pradeep Sharma
- Risk (2007)
- Shootout at Lokhandwala (2007) and Shootout at Wadala (2013)
- Singam, a Tamil film series
- Tharkappu (2016), a Tamil film starring Sakthi Vasudevan
- Visaranai (2015), a Tamil film directed by Vetrimaaran
- Vettaiyan (2024), a Tamil film starring Rajinikanth
- Jana Gana Mana (2022), a Malayalam film starring Prithviraj Sukumaran and Suraj Venjaramoodu
- Anjaam Pathira (2020), a Malayalam film starring Kunchacko Boban

=== Books ===
- Sacred Games (2007), a novel by Vikram Chandra, is based on the police force in Mumbai. It includes dramatic depictions of police encounters.
- The Third Squad (2017), a novel by V. Sanjay Kumar, revolves around a Mumbai encounter policeman with Asperger's Syndrome. It includes multiple depictions of police encounters.

== See also ==
- 2015 sandalwood smugglers encounter in Andhra Pradesh
- Cordon and search – Military tactic in counterinsurgency operations
- Crossfire (Bangladesh) – Extrajudicial killings in Bangladesh
- List of attacks on civilians attributed to Sri Lankan government forces
- Lists of killings by law enforcement officers
