= Harish =

Harish may refer to:

== Places ==
- Harish, Israel, a city in Israel
- Arish, Iran (also known as Harish), a village in South Khorasan Province, Iran
- Arasht, Zanjan (also known as Harish), a village in Zanjan Province, Iran

== People ==
- Harish (Tamil actor), full name Arish Kumar, Indian film actor
- Harish Bhadani (1933–2009), Indian poet
- Harish Bhimani (born 1956), voice over artist
- Harish Chandra Burnwal, Indian Journalist and writer
- Harish Chandra Durgapal, Indian politician
- Harish Chandra Mehrotra, Mathematician
- Harish Chandra Mitra (1837–1872), Bengali playwright and poet
- Harish Chandra Mukherjee (1824–1861), Indian journalist
- Harish Hande, Magsaysay Award Winner
- Harish Iyer (born 1979), Indian activist (gay rights, child rights)
- Harish Kalyan (born 1990), Tamil actor
- Harish Kapadia (born 1945), Indian Himalayan mountaineer.
- Harish Khare, Indian newspaper editor
- Harish Manwani (born 1954), chief operating officer of Unilever
- Harish Nagpal (born 1964), Indian politician
- Harish Patel (born 1953), Indian Bollywood actor
- Harish Raghavendra (born 1976), Indian singer
- Harish Raj (born 1976), Kannada actor
- Harish Rawat (born 1948), Indian politician
- Harish Saluja, American filmmaker
- Harish Salve (born 1955), Indian lawyer
- Harish Shankar (born 1977), Telugu director
- Harish Sharma (born 1932), Fiji politician
- Harish Verma, Indian Bollywood actor
- Harish Singh Dhami, Indian politician
- Yohannes Harish, Eritrean soccer player

== See also ==
- Hari, Hindu deity Vishnu
- Haris (disambiguation)
- Harish Chandra (disambiguation)
- Harish Khanna (disambiguation)
- Harish Kumar (disambiguation)
- Harish Mehta (disambiguation)
- Harris (disambiguation)
- Arish (disambiguation)
