= History of printing and publishing in Dhaka =

It can not be said with certainty where the first printing press was set up in Bangladesh. It is conjectured that the first printing press in Bangladesh was in Rangpur during 1847, about 335 kilometres (208 mi) away from Dhaka. The first printed piece from this printing press was a weekly newspaper named Rangapur Bartabaha (রঙ্গপুর বার্ত্তাবহ) in August 1847. In addition the first two Bengali weekly newspapers were from Rangpur. Printing machines took more than sixty years to reach East Bengal or Dhaka from Kolkata. The first English weekly newspaper, The Dacca News, was printed and published from Dhaka in 1856. So, it is assumed that after nine years of Rangpur press, the first printing machine of Dhaka was established and the press was named 'Bangla Press'.

== Dacca Press ==
The printed edition of The Dacca News was released on 18 April 1856 from the Dhaka Press. In the beginning, it was a one-page edition costing two annas per copy. It was initially a weekly paper coming out on every Saturday. With the 13th version, the pages were increased to four and it also had a 'supplement' but the then current market price was cause of concern. With its second volume, the pages were increased to eight. There were five owners of Dacca Press who were also the owners of the newspaper. They were A.M Cameron, N.P Pogose, J.A Greg, J.P Wise, and K.A Gani. It was a tumultuous period when the riot between English indigo planters and Bengali peasants was at its peak. Most of the owners were zamindars and they published newspapers to secure their own interests. Alexander Forbes, the editor of The Dacca News wrote in one of the edition of The Dacca News:

In an out-of-way, if not the most out of-the-wayest corner of the world, we established a press. We had not a single compositor, or Printer or Devil. We had to educate them all. We set up, in type, a great part of our first members with our own hands. We have been, down to the present day, our own chief correcter of proofs.

Sreenath Dutta, a Bengali, was the printer of the newspaper till the 13th edition. Probably, Forbes had trained him. It was during the time that the printing press faced severe adversity, though Dhaka had been once the capital of Bengal and also one of the major cities of the East Bengal at that time. Forbes mentions in one of the editions of Dacca News of 1856 that he could not print a report due to the lack of necessary types.

== Kattra Press ==
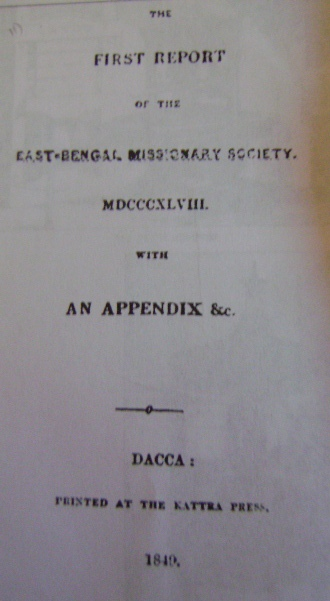
Title Page of The First Report from Kattra Press

A Bangladeshi writer and historian, Muntasir Mamun in his book Unish Shatake Dhakar Mudran o Prakashana (1848–1900), mentions that he finds 'The First Report of the East Bengal Missionary Society. MDCC-CXLVIII with an Appendix etc.'. It was in octavo form containing forty pages. 'Dacca: Printed at the Kattra Press, 1849' was written on its title page. It suggests that printing press exists in Dhaka before 1856. Thus it can be said that the printing press first starts working in the year of 1848/49 in Kattra. Muntasir Mamun wants to mean Chhoto Kattra where the Baptist missionaries resided and set up their offices. So this report published in 1849 by Baptist Missionaries is the first printed piece. Two more Bengali books named Prahelika (প্রহেলিকা) and Prarthana Anukram (প্রার্থনা অনুক্রম) were from Kattra. Though Prahelika was the first Bengali book of East Bengal, it was not published completely in Bengali.

During 1847, Reverend Johannes Heberlein was in charge of East Bengal Missionary Society of Dhaka. Evangelical Missionary Society of Basel sent Samuel Boast and Frederick Lehman to assist him. Boast was skilled in the field of printing. Under his direction the first press was set up in 1848 in Chhoto Kattra which he brought from Basel. Graham Shaw speculates that the Kattra Press survives four years. Then it was bought in order to publish Dacca News. It is not known whether more were printed except the report and two books from there. When Dacca News stops printing, another English newspaper The Bengal Times was published from Dacca press and existed till the twentieth century.

== Bangala Jantra ==
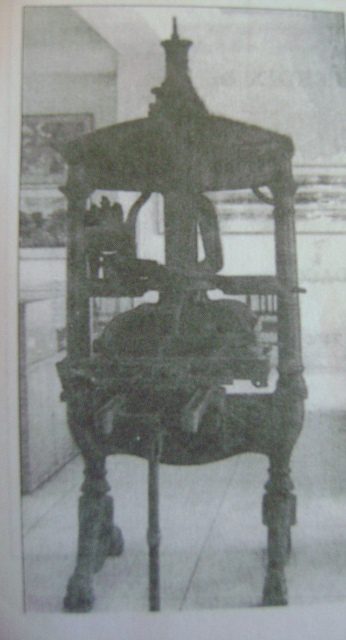
Image of Bangala Jantra

During 1848–1857, two more machines were brought to Dhaka but that did not make much impact on the slack business of printing and publishing. The establishment of Bangala Jantra in 1860 was a watershed in the printing history of Dhaka. Its proprietor was a Bengali. This changed things for the better because after this, Bengali books and newspapers were being published at a frequent rate. Following this, more machines were brought to Dhaka.

The printing press became an important tool of exchanging thoughts or opinions. The Brahmo Movement in Bengal played a vital role in the printing history. The Brahmos published Dacca Prakash (ঢাকা প্রকাশ) while the orthodox Hindus published Hindu Hitaishini (হিন্দু হিতৈষিণী) from Sulov Jantra in response to the former paper.

Abdul Qayyum quotes from the essay of Girijakanta Ghosh that the owners of the Bangala Jantra were Braja Sundar Mitra, Bhagaban Chandra Basu and Kashikanta Mukhopadhyay. Braja Sundar Mitra undertook the enterprise but there were other partners of Bangala Jantra. On the fifth year, one of the personnel of Dacca Prakash, Govinda Prasad Roy bought the ownership of Bangala Jantra and Dacca Prakash. After the death of Govinda Prasad, his son-in-law, Yadav Chandra Sen took up the responsibilities of both the press and newspaper. He continued only for two years and handed them over to Talukdar Babu Guruganga Aich Chowdhury of Charipara of Manikganj. Guruganga became the owner of Bangala Jantra and Dacca Prakash for just 3450 taka and worked sixteen years as its editor. Financial crisis led him to hand over the ownership to Shrijukta Mukunda Bihari Chakrabarty (B.A) and Radha Raman Ghosh (B.A). After a few days, Mukunda Bihari became the sole owner and ran it for thirty years. Dacca Prakash was still published in 1959 when it had as its editor, Abdul Rashid.

The first Bengali monthly periodical Kabita Kusumabali (কবিতা কুসুমাবলী) of East Bengal or Dacca was published from Bangala Jantra in 1860. The editor was none other the poet, Krishna Chandra Mazumdar. But the publication of the said periodical stopped in 1860. In that very year a monthly named Nababyabohar Sanghita (নবব্যবহার সংহিতা) edited by lawyer Ramchandra Bhowmick was published from Bangala Jantra. Deenabandhu Mitra's Neel Darpan also came out from Bangala Jantra in 1860.

== Other printing machines ==
In 1862, another machine named 'Nutan Jantra' was brought to Dhaka but the name of the owner remains unknown. The monthly Abakash Ranjika (অবকাশ রঞ্জিকা) and Chittaranjika (চিত্তরঞ্জিকা) in 1862, were probably printed by the machine.

'Shulav Jantra' was set up in 1863. The manager of it was a poet - Harish Chandra Mitra but nothing is known about its ownership. The periodicals edited by Harish Chandra from this machine, were published respectively as Dacca Darpan(1863), Kabbya Prakash (কাব্য প্রকাশ) (1864), then there was a weekly called Hindu Hitaishini (against the Brahmo movement), Shuva Shadhini (শুভ সাধিনী) and Hitakari (হিতকরী)(1871). Many Dobhashi puthis were printed from this press. In 1864, Girish Chandra Roy of Baliati established 'Biggyapani Jantra'. In 1865, a weekly named Biggyapani (বিজ্ঞাপনী) was published by the machine, and was edited by Krishna Chandra Mazumdar. Biggyapani Jantra was transferred to Mymensingh in 1866 and within two years it was closed down.

In 1869, Girish Chandra Roy again put up a machine named 'Girish Jantra' in Dhaka. Harish Chandra Mitra (the founder of the weekly Hindu Hitaishaini), published a periodical - Mitra Prakash (মিত্র প্রকাশ) from this Girish Jantra. In 1874, Kali Prasanna Ghosh bought out the Girish Jantra. A monthly that was edited by him, wasBandhab (বান্ধব)which was also printed from there. Though a literary person, he was a skilled businessman as well. Within a few days, Girish Jantra made its mark on the printing industry. Most of the books from Dhaka were printed from it and it did survive for a long time. Foyezunnesa Chowdhurani's Rupjalal (রূপজালাল)(1876) was also printed from the Girish Jantra.

The Brahmos, Hindus, Europeans initiated the printing project in Dhaka in the 1870s and the Muslims later entered the market. The latter mainly printed puthis. According to Professor Qayyum, 'Mohammadi Jantra' was the first Muslim Printing Press of Dhaka, situated at Fazle Ali Bazar near Begum Bazar. Munshi Mohammad Jan was its owner. In 1878–79, 'Sayedi Jantra was set up in the same place with Abul Baset as its owner. 'Azizia Press' (আজিজিয়া প্রেস) was perhaps established in 1882 in Mogoltuli. The owner of the press was the puthi-writer Munshi Mohammad Foyezuddin. To print Dobhashi puthis, a special kind of type was necessary. Before the establishment of printing press, they had to use the press of the Hindus. Thus there were usually some spelling mistakes. Many puthi writers used their own styles to make the types and also warned others not to copy or imitate their works.

Exactly what kinds of printing machines were used in Dacca (Dhaka) can not be definitely said, but Dacca Prakash was printed by 'Chila or Columbian Press'. Albion Press was also popular in this time. These were made of iron. because of their good quality, Albion machines were the most imported machines from Kolkata.

Little is known about the expenses incurred due to printing and publishing of a single piece from Dacca. In 1863, an account of the expenses was found in an advertisement in Dacca Prakash. The advertisement stated the price of per forme of Bengali printing was six taka and per forme of English was five taka.

Even after the seven years, the expenses remained the same even though the market was competitive. In the beginning, prices were high. But to expand the market, the prices of compose and printing were reduced. In 1880, the proprietor manager, Govinda Prasad Roy of Dacca Prakash published an English advertisement:

"THE DACCA BENGALI PRESS of various sorts of English Types and are ready to execute neatly and clearly. With Despatch and at moderate charge, Book, Pamphlet, Letters, Catalogues, Cheques, Recipts Labels, Cards and other sorts of Job works."

During the 1860–70s, to bear the expenses of the press, various types of forms were printed for sale. Among these, the forms of invoices, challans, cheques and other mercantile forms were in demand. Even many of the press type forms were used as stationery shops where papers were also sold.

In the beginning, the compositors got comparatively higher salary than the editors because skilled compositors were hard to find. For example, the head compositor of Dacca Prakash received more salary than the editor - the poet Krishna Chandra Mazumdar. From the twentieth century, the salary of a compositor started declining because of the competitive and expansive printing market.

== Location ==
The various press of Dhaka were not centred or located in a particular place. Most of them were located in the areas between Banglabazar to Begumbazar. Apart from these, some were located in Mogoltuli or Armanitola. As books were usually sold from Patuatuli and Baburbazar, most of the machines were set up in these areas. The many press of Dhaka became a centre of socio economic exchange. Book-shops or libraries were not there then. All kinds of people like authors, publishers, editors, printers, compositors, workers, retailers and their friends - in short, all who were associated with the books, always gathered around the many press from Banglabazar to Begumbazar. Now some printing company are providing online service in Bangladesh.

Around the nineteenth century printing and publishing of the Bengali books were in two categories - text books(পাঠ্য) and others (not included- the school/college text books).

== Text books ==
Right from the beginning of the nineteenth century, there was a great demand of text books for the increasing number of pathshalas and schools. Serampore Missionaries, Calcutta School Book Society and Calcutta School Society initiated publishing text books. Madan Mohan Tarkalankar and Ishwar Chandra Vidyasagar were not only the pioneering figures but they hold a strong legacy for the next generations. Among the text books Barnashiksha, Balyashiksha (বাল্যশিক্ষা) or Primer were more popular. Ram Sundar Basak wrote Balyashiksha for the students of East Bengal and it was published from Sulav Jantra in 1877. Text Books were the most published books from Dacca. Publishing of Bodhini (note on textbooks) or note books were increasing and highly for business purpose. The popular text books and note books writers were Harish Chandra Mitra, Kali Prasanna Ghosh, Nabakanta Chattapadhyay, Dinanath Sen and so on. Govinda Prasad Das' Byakaran Saar (ব্যাকরণ সার) (1859–63), Pranlal Chakrabarti's Ankabodh (অঙ্কবোধ) (first volume-1866), Annadakishore Sen's Arther Sharthokota (1868) and Dinanath Sen's Dhaka Jelar Vugol ebong songkhepe Oitihashik Biboron (ঢাকা জেলার ভূগোল এবং সংক্ষেপে ঔতিহাসিক বিবরণ) were notable.

== Law ==
The British colonisers made laws for the Indians and attempted to translate it into Bengali to make them aware of it. The middle class started believing in its neutral location and thought the laws would save and protect them. At this time, law as a profession began booming. So the books on law were in high demand. During the nineteenth century, not many books on law were available, but about forty four books were published from Dacca (Dhaka). Among these, Tarinikumar Basu's 1866 Shaler 6 act, no-1, 5, 15 and 25 Aain (১৮৬৬ সালের ৬ অ্যাক্ট,নং-১, ৫, ১৫ এবং ২৫ আইন) was the oldest and it was printed from Bangala Jantra in 1866.

== Biographical and autobiographical books ==
About thirty biographical and autobiographical books were published from Dacca (Dhaka) in the nineteenth century. Only three books were autobiographical among them. The oldest autobiography was Etibritto(1868) by Krishna Chandra Mazumdar and the others were Sangkhipto Jibon Brittanta (সংক্ষিপ্ত জীবন বৃত্তান্ত) (1882) by Rashbihari Mukhopadhaya and Shekaler Darogar Kahini (সেকালের দারোগার কাহিনী) (1888) by Girish Chandra. In 1898, a biography named Victoria Charita (ভিক্টোরিয়া চরিত) by Kamakhya Charan Bandopadhyay was published from Dacca (Dhaka).

== History books ==
In the nineteenth century saw only twenty historical books being published from Dacca (Dhaka). Among them wereBanga Etihash er saar(1866) by Govinda Chandra Chattapadhyay which was the earliest to be published and hence the oldest. Some books were used as school or college text books like Bangalar Etihash (বাঙ্গালার ইতিহাস) by Kedareshwar Chakrabarty and Bangladesh o Assam er Sangkhipta Bibaran (বাংলাদেশ ও আসামের সংক্ষিপ্ত বিবরণ) by Dinanath Sen.

== Novel ==
The nineteenth century can be marked as the first phase of writing of the Bengali novels. But then novels had not yet realised its fullest potential in Bengali. Bankim Chandra Chattopadhyay developed this proto-novelistic phase and thereby novel achieved its full form. The novels published from Dacca (Dhaka) were fewer in number when compared to Kolkata. Only twenty-six novels were published from Dacca and Jagrata Swapna (জাগ্রত স্বপ্ন) (1864) by Barada Prasad Roy was among them.

Religion became a major issue in some of the novels. For example, Islam in Prem Darpan by Arjumund Ali, Brahmo in Rajkumari (রাজকুমারী) by Ananda Chandra Mitra and Christianity in Haran Chandra Raha's Sarala (সরলা), etc.

== Poetry ==
In the second half of the nineteenth century, poetry was a vital tool of expression of myriad thoughts including patriotism . The major poets of the East Bengal were Michael Madhusudan Dutta, Ananda Chandra Mitra, Kaykobaad, Krishna Chandra Mazumdar, Nabin Chandra Sen, Govinda Chandra Das and Harish Chandra Mitra. The first monthly published from Dacca was a poetry magazine- kusumabali edited by Krishna Chandra Mazumdar, Harish Chandra Mitra and Prasanna Kumar Sen. More than hundred books on poetry were published from Dacca in the nineteenth century.

== Books on medical science ==
In order to introduce the western medical science, the then British Lieutenant-Governor George Campbell in 1873, decided to set up medical schools in Calcutta (Kolkata), Dacca (Dhaka) and Patna and the medium of teaching was Bengali. This necessitated the publishing of Bengali books on medical science for the medical students. Dacca contributed much in publishing of these books than any others. The first book published from Dacca was Formulary Book by Aainuddin Ahmed in 1872. Many journals on it were also published from Dacca. They were -Ayurved Sanjibani (আয়ুর্বেদ সঞ্জীবনী), Chikitsa (চিকিৎসা), Chikitsa Darpan (চিকিৎসা দর্পণ), Vishak (ভিষক), Homeopathik Anubadika (হোমিওপ্যাথিক অনুবাদিকা), Homeopathik Pracharak (হোমিওপ্যাথিক প্রচারক) and so on. The notable writers were Kashi Chandra Dutta, Durga Das Roy, Dwarakanath Gupta, Surya Narayan Ghosh, Hari Prasad Chakrabarty and so on.

== Religion ==
A strong religious sense never allowed the Bengali of the nineteenth century to think freely. This gradually made life complex and so there were attempts to reform the religious issues which later took a form of movements. As consequences of these movements, Brahmo Samaj emerged out to uproot the evils in orthodox Hinduism like the 'Satidaha pratha', 'Koulinya Pratha'. Islamic doctrines were also attempted to change. By this time, in the Indian sub-continent missionaries started disseminating Christianity. In the first half of the nineteenth century, they published many books on Christianity. Even the first book published from Dacca (Dhaka) was about Christianity. Most of the religious books from Dacca contained the various methods of performing prayers of the respective religions. Koulinya Sangshadhani (কৌলিণ্য সংশোধনী) and Bollali Sangshadhani (বল্লালী সংশোধনী) were significant books on religion.

== Play and farce ==
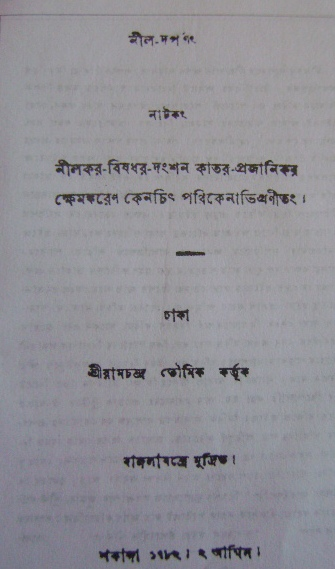
Title Page of Nil Darpan by Deenabandhu Mitra

Plays, farces were written to portray the social disparity, moral depreciation and above all to show the complete picture of the society. In the second half of the nineteenth century, the influential play, Nil Darpan (নীল দর্পণ) by Dinabandhu Mitra was published from Dacca (Dhaka). Another notable play Swarnashrinkhal (স্বর্ণশৃঙ্খল) by doctor Durgadas Kar was probably from Dacca. Harish Chandra Mitra and Harihar Nandi were significant among the farce writers. Eight farces of Harish Chandra were published from Dacca. They were - Myao Dhorbe Ke? (ম্যাও ধরবে কে?), Janaki Natak(জানকী নাটক), Ghar Thakte Babui Veje (ঘর থাক্তে বাবুই ভেজে), Agamani (আগমণী), Shuvosra Shighrang (শুভস্য শীঘ্রং), Hatavagya Shikshak (হতভাগ্য শিক্ষক), Prahallad Natak (প্রহ্লাদ নাটক) and Nirbasita Seeta (নির্বাসিতা সীতা).

== Panchali ==
A great number of panchalis saw being published from Dacca as the Bengalis of the early nineteenth century extremely believed in fatalism. According to the 'Press and Registration Act of Books (1867)', most of the panchalis were not submitted to the Government. Thus, little is known about the panchalis. The published panchalis from Dacca were mainly written on Shani-Dev, Peer-Satya Narayan (Satya as Narayan to the Hindus and Peer to the Muslims), Trinath and so on. They were cheap, small in size (not more than twelve pages). During the 1870s, most of the panchalis were published from Dacca.

== Puthi ==
Most of the puthis had for its subject - Islam and its saints. Thus, Puthi differs from Panchali in this respect. Dacca (Dhaka) became the centre of the publication of puthis as Muslims were the majority. The popular puthi-writers were Khoaz Master, Abdul Gafur, Abdul Karim, Sayed Jan, Moniruddin Ahmed, Munshi Azimuddin, Munshi Abdur Rahim. Del Aram(1867) (দেল আরাম), Sher Mashgul(1885) (শের মশগুল), Shah Parir Path (শাহ পরীর পথ) (1887) and Usuf Jolekha (ইউসুফ জোলেখা) (1896) by Munshi Garibullah were published from Dacca.

== Prose ==
Around the first half of the nineteenth century, in the Indian sub-continent, missionaries began writing proses to spread Christianity. But few proses were published from Dacca because the writers did not achieve the creativity and intellectuality of that is necessary in writing prose pieces. In 1869, Kali Prasanna Ghosh's first book Nari Jati Bishayak Prostab (নারীজাতি বিষয়ক প্রস্তাব) was published from Dacca (Dhaka). Abdus Sobhan's Hindu Mosolman (হিন্দু মোসলমান) (1891) published from Dhaka is one of the significant prose pieces of the time.

== Patha Kabita ==
Literary critics and historians do not consider it a great literary piece. It consists of four, eight or sixteen pages in double demai newsprint papers and was very cheap. Due to poor communication, Dhaka faced problems of news dissemination. The Patha-kobi used to compose instantly what happened around like the Tornado in 1877, the earthquake in 1897 and so on and thus patha-kobitas became the authentic source of news. With the development of communication system, rising rate of education, availability of newspaper faded away its importance and drove the patha -kobi to extinction. The patha-kobitas published from Dhaka were of Kushai Sarkar's Nanabidho Gaan (নানাবিধ গান) that were printed from Samantak Jantra in 1892 and Bipin Chand Gopes Jhorer Gaan (ঝড়ের গান) printed by Jagabandhu Dey from Garib Jantra.

== Sources ==
- Mamun, Muntasir, Unish Shatake Dhakar Mudran o Prakashana (1848–1900)
- Mamun, Muntasir, 'Kothay Galo She Patha-Kabita', Mudraner Sanskriti o Bangla Boi, edited by Swapan Chakrabarty, December, 2007, pp. 108–121.
- Khastageer, Ashish, 'Unish Shatake Bangla Boi er Bazar', Bangla Chapa Boi er 225 Bachar, (Ababhas, October–December, 2003), edited by Swapan Chakrabarty
