= Haris =

Haris may refer to:

== Places ==
- Haris, Mazandaran, a village in Mazandaran Province, Iran
- Haris, Salfit, a Palestinian village in the West Bank
- Haris or Hariss, a southern Lebanese village

== People ==
- Haris (given name), including a list of people
- Haris (surname), a list of people
- Haris Alagic, stage name Haris, Dutch singer-songwriter and guitarist
- Haris (caste), people of indigenous origin found in the Indian state of West Bengal

== Other uses ==
- a traditional name of Gamma Boötis, a star
- Tichu, card game also known as Haris

== See also ==
- Heris (disambiguation)
- Harish (disambiguation)
- Harris (disambiguation)
