= Amit Shah =

Indian politician (born 1964)

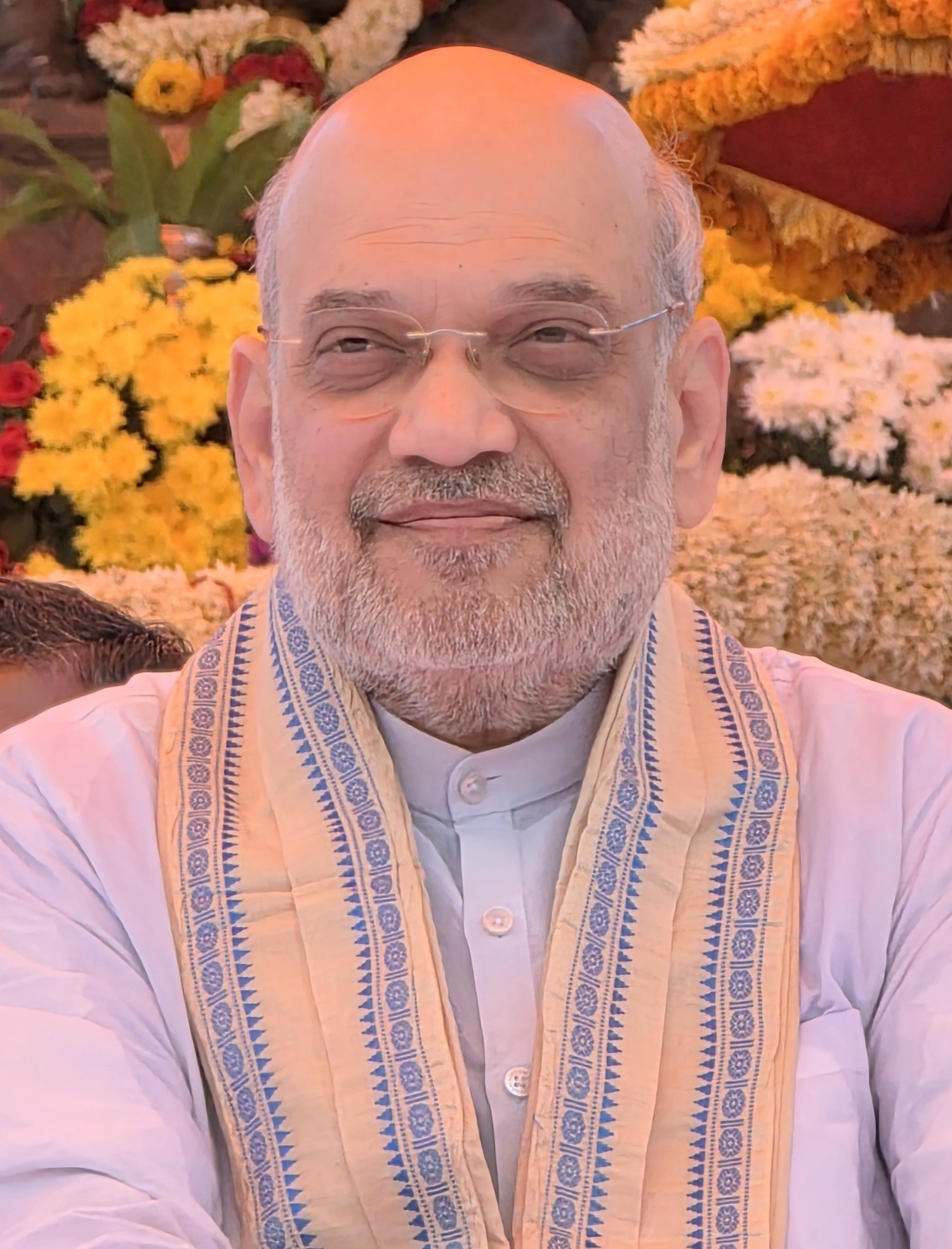
- Shah in 2025

31st Union Minister of Home Affairs
- Incumbent
- Assumed office 30 May 2019
- President: Ramnath Kovind; Droupadi Murmu
- Prime Minister: Narendra Modi
- Preceded by: Rajnath Singh

1st Union Minister of Cooperation
- Incumbent
- Assumed office 7 July 2021
- President: Ramnath Kovind; Droupadi Murmu
- Prime Minister: Narendra Modi
- Preceded by: Office established

Member of Parliament, Lok Sabha
- Incumbent
- Assumed office 23 May 2019
- Preceded by: Lal Krishna Advani
- Constituency: Gandhinagar, Gujarat
- Majority: 744,716 (56.34%)

Member of Parliament, Rajya Sabha
- In office 19 August 2017 – 23 May 2019
- Preceded by: Dilip Pandya
- Succeeded by: Subrahmanyam Jaishankar
- Constituency: Gujarat

Chairman of National Democratic Alliance
- Incumbent
- Assumed office 9 July 2014
- Preceded by: Lal Krishna Advani

9th National President of Bharatiya Janata Party
- In office 9 July 2014 – 20 January 2020
- Preceded by: Rajnath Singh
- Succeeded by: Jagat Prakash Nadda

Member of Gujarat Legislative Assembly
- In office 2012 – 2017
- Preceded by: Constituency established
- Succeeded by: Kaushik Patel
- Constituency: Naranpura
- In office 1997 – 2012
- Preceded by: Harishchandra Lavjibhai Patel
- Succeeded by: Constituency abolished
- Constituency: Sarkhej

Minister of State in Gujarat
- In office 2002 – 2010
- Departments: Home; Law and Justice; Prison; Border Security; Civil Defence; Excise; Home Guards; Transport; Prohibition; Gram Rakshak Dal; Police Housing; Legislative Affairs
- Chief Minister: Narendra Modi

Personal details
- Born: Amit Anilchandra Shah; 22 October 1964 (age 61) Bombay, Maharashtra, India
- Party: Bharatiya Janata Party
- Spouse: Sonal Shah (m. 1987)
- Children: Jay Shah (son)
- Education: Gujarat University (BSc)
- Occupation: Politician
- Website: www.amitshah.co.in

Amit Anilchandra Shah (born 22 October 1964) is an Indian politician who has served as the 31st Minister of Home Affairs since 2019, the longest-serving holder of the office in Indian history. Additionally he has been the 1st Minister of Co-operation since July 2021. He is also the member of parliament (MP) for Gandhinagar. He served as the 10th president of the Bharatiya Janata Party (BJP) from 2014 to 2020. He has also served as chairman of the National Democratic Alliance (NDA) since 2014. He had been elected as a member of the upper house of parliament, Rajya Sabha, from Gujarat from 2017 to 2019. Shah is a chief strategist of the BJP and an ardent ally of Prime Minister Narendra Modi, and is considered as the second most powerful man in India, just behind Prime Minister Narendra Modi.

Shah also served as a member of the Gujarat Legislative Assembly from Naranpura Assembly constituency from 2012 to 2017 and Sarkhej from 1997 to 2012 and the minister of State for Home, Law and Justice, Prison, Border Security, Civil Defense, Excise, Home Guards, Transport, Prohibition, Gram Rakshak Dal, Police Housing, Legislative and Parliamentary Affairs, government of Gujarat in the Modi ministry from 2002 to 2012. During his college days, Shah was a member of the Akhil Bharatiya Vidyarthi Parishad (ABVP), the student wing of the Rashtriya Swayamsevak Sangh (RSS), a Hindutva paramilitary organisation. At the age of 18, he secured a position in the ABVP and joined the BJP in 1987.

Shah was the BJP's in-charge for India's largest and politically most crucial state, Uttar Pradesh, during the 2014 Lok Sabha elections. The BJP-led NDA won 73 out of 80 seats. As a result, Shah rose to national prominence and was appointed as the party's national president in July 2014. He has played an organising and membership-promotional role in the elections of many states since 2014. In his initial two years, the BJP achieved success in legislative assembly elections in Maharashtra, Haryana, Jammu and Kashmir, Jharkhand and Assam but lost ground in Delhi and the large eastern state of Bihar in 2015.

In 2017, he was partly credited with the party victories in Uttar Pradesh, the largest state in India by population, as well as Uttarakhand, his home state, Gujarat and Manipur. However, the Akali–BJP alliance lost power in the Punjab election. In 2018, the party lost power in the states of Chhattisgarh, Rajasthan and Madhya Pradesh. A year later, the BJP won 303 seats to get a majority in the 2019 Indian general election under Shah's party leadership.

As home affairs minister, Shah has been responsible for successfully introducing bills in the Parliament that cover Article 370, reorganisation of Jammu and Kashmir, criminal laws, and citizenship. Under his tenure, in continuation of the previous Modi administration, there has been reduction in districts covered by AFSPA, signing of peace accords and agreements related to the northeast, and improvement of the security situation related to left wing extremism.

== Early life ==
Amit Anilchandra Shah is born into a Gujarati Hindu Bania family of Mansa on 22 October 1964 at Mumbai. His great-grandfather was the Nagarseth (town's headman/Chief Merchant) of the small Princely state of Mansa. His father, Anilchandra Shah, a businessman from Mansa, owned a successful PVC pipe business.

He went to school in Mehsana and moved to Ahmedabad to study biochemistry at CU Shah Science College. He graduated with a Bachelor's of Science (B.Sc.) in biochemistry and then worked for his father's business. He also worked as a stockbroker and in co-operative banks in Ahmedabad. Shah was associated with the Rashtriya Swayamsevak Sangh (RSS), a Hindutva paramilitary volunteer organisation, since childhood; he participated in the neighbourhood shakhas (branches) as a boy. He formally became an RSS swayamsevak (volunteer) during his college days in Ahmedabad. He first met Narendra Modi in 1982 through the Ahmedabad RSS circles. At that time, Modi was an RSS pracharak (propagator), working as in-charge of youth activities in the city.

== Early political career ==
=== Entry into politics ===
Shah started his political career in 1982 after joining the RSS. Soon after, he got acquainted with Narendra Modi, a pracharak (propagator) of the RSS at that time. Reportedly, he was advised by Modi to join the student wing of the RSS, the Akhil Bharatiya Vidyarthi Parishad (ABVP). Soon after Shah joined the ABVP in the year 1983. Later on, he joined the Bharatiya Janata Party (BJP) in 1987, one year before Modi joined the party. He became an activist of the BJP's youth wing, Bharatiya Janata Yuva Morcha (BJYM), in 1987. He gradually rose in the BJYM hierarchy, in which he held various posts including ward secretary, taluka secretary, state secretary, vice-president and general secretary. He became known for his management skills when he was the election campaign manager for Lal Krishna Advani in Gandhinagar during the 1991 Lok Sabha elections.

In 1995, the BJP formed its first government in Gujarat, with Keshubhai Patel as Chief Minister. At that time, the Indian National Congress, the BJP's main rival, was highly influential in rural Gujarat. Modi and Shah worked together to eliminate Congress in the rural areas. Their strategy was to find the second-most influential leader in every village and get them to join the BJP. They created a network of 8,000 influential rural leaders who had lost elections to the pradhan (village chief) post in various villages.

Modi and Shah used the same strategy to reduce Congress' influence over the state's powerful co-operatives, which played an important role in the state's economy. In 1999, Shah was elected as the president of the Ahmedabad District Cooperative Bank (ADCB), the biggest cooperative bank in India. In Gujarat, such elections had traditionally been won on caste considerations, and the co-operative banks had traditionally been controlled by Patels, Gadarias and Kshatriyas. Despite not belonging to any of these castes, Shah won the election. At that time, the bank was on the verge of collapse, as they had accumulated losses of ₹36 crores. Shah turned around the bank's fortune within a year; the following year, the bank registered a profit of ₹27 crores. By 2014, its profit had increased to around ₹250 crores. Shah also ensured that 11 of the bank's 22 directors were BJP loyalists.

Modi and Shah also sought to reduce Congress' hold over sports bodies in the state. Shah served as the president of the Gujarat State Chess Association. In 2009, he became the vice-president of the profitable Gujarat Cricket Association (GCA), while Modi served as its president. In 2014, after Modi became Prime Minister of India, Shah became the president of GCA.

Modi, who had become a general secretary in the party's state unit by the early 1990s, used his influence to get bigger roles for Shah. He convinced Patel to appoint Shah as the chairman of the Gujarat State Financial Corporation, a public sector financial institution that finances small and medium-scale enterprises. After Shankersinh Vaghela and some other leaders complained about Modi's growing popularity in the Gujarat government, the party leadership moved Modi out of Gujarat to the BJP headquarters in Delhi. During this time (1995–2001), Shah served as Modi's confidante in Gujarat.

== Gujarat state government ==
In 1997, Modi lobbied to get Shah a BJP ticket for the Gujarat Legislative Assembly by-election in Sarkhej. Shah became an MLA in February 1997 after winning the by-election. He retained his seat in the 1998 Assembly elections.

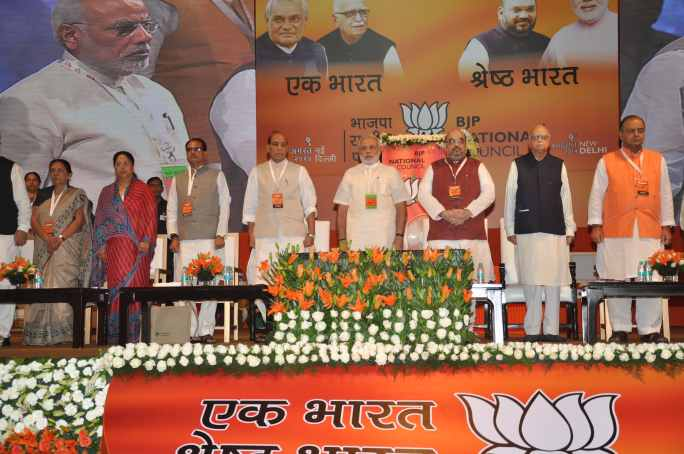
PM Modi addresses a BJP National Council Meeting.

In October 2001, the BJP replaced Keshubhai Patel with Narendra Modi as the chief minister of Gujarat after allegations of inefficient administration. Over the next few years, Modi and Shah gradually sidelined their political rivals.

Shah contested the 2002 Assembly election from the Sarkhej constituency in Ahmedabad. He won by the highest margin among all candidates, with 158,036 votes. He improved his margin of victory in the 2007 Assembly election, in which he won from Sarkhej again. During Modi's twelve-year tenure as the Gujarat CM, Shah emerged as one of the most powerful leaders in Gujarat. After winning the 2002 elections, he became the youngest minister in the Modi government and was given multiple portfolios. At one time, he held 12 portfolios: Home, Law and Justice, Prison, Border Security, Civil Defence, Excise, Transport, Prohibition, Home Guards, Gram Rakshak Dal, Police Housing and Legislative and Parliamentary Affairs.

In 2004, the Congress-led government announced its intention to repeal the Prevention of Terrorism Act, which they called regressive. Shah piloted the Gujarat Control of Organised Crime (Amendment) Bill through the Gujarat State Assembly amid an opposition walk-out. Shah also played an important role in convincing the Modi government to pass the Gujarat Freedom of Religion Bill, which made religious conversions difficult in the state of Gujarat. The act requires religious conversions in the state – most of which are from Hinduism to other religions – to be approved by a district magistrate. Shah portrayed the bill as a measure against forced conversions, although critics claimed that the bill undermined the Indian Constitution. Between 2011 and 2016, approximately half of the applications for religious conversion in Gujarat were declined by the local government.

Shah was accused of sidelining the police officers who testified against the Gujarat government in cases related to the fake encounters and the 2002 riots. Shah has also been accused of manipulating the electoral constituency delimitation exercise in Gujarat to favour the BJP.

=== Sohrabuddin case ===
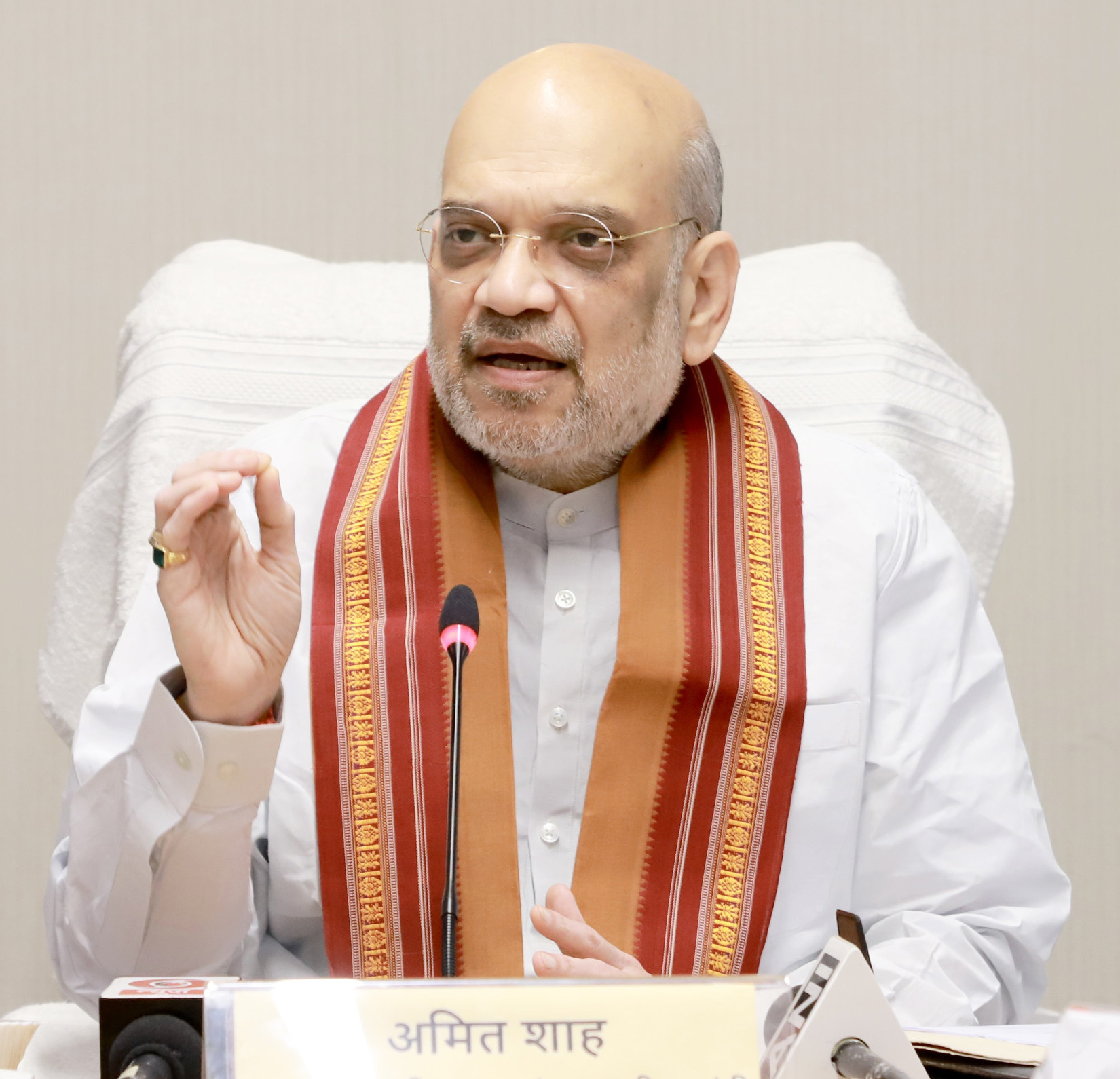
Amit Shah in 2023

In 2010, Shah was accused of having orchestrated the extrajudicial killings of Sohrabuddin Sheikh, his wife Kauser Bi and his criminal associate Tulsiram Prajapati. According to the Central Bureau of Investigation (CBI), Sheikh had been harassing some marble traders of Rajasthan by demanding protection money. The CBI claimed that two of these marble traders paid Shah to eliminate Sheikh, along with police officers DIG D.G. Vanzara and SP Rajkumar Pandian.

The CBI presented phone call records, which showed that Shah had been in touch with the accused police officers when the victims were in their custody. It also presented videotapes of Patel brothers' conversations with two of Shah's associates at the Ahmedabad District Cooperative Bank (ADCB). The Patel brothers, who had several criminal cases against them, also spoke against Shah.

Shah dismissed all the accusations against him as politically motivated. He pointed out that during his tenure as Home Minister, Gujarat was one of the states with a small number of police encounters in the country. He stated that he kept in touch with the police officers on the phone in the normal course of his duties as Home Minister. He accused Congress of misusing the CBI and claimed that only the cases in Gujarat were being scrutinised, while the rest of the country had witnessed around 1,500 encounters during the same period. He said if the CBI had any solid evidence against him, it would have been able to frame charges against him. In 2010, Police Commissioner Geetha Johri, who first investigated the case, claimed that the CBI was pressurising her to falsely implicate Shah in the Sohrabuddin case.

D.G. Vanzara was also accused in the Ishrat Jahan case but the CBI did not charge Shah.

Shah was arrested on 25 July 2010 in connection with the Sohrabuddin case. At one time, Shah was considered one of the main contenders for Gujarat Chief Minister. However, his political career was hurt by the arrest; many leaders in the Gujarat government distanced themselves from him. His fellow ministers considered him an autocratic person, who did not have good relations with his colleagues.

When Shah applied for bail, the CBI raised concerns that he would use his political power to prevent justice from taking its course. On 29 October 2010, the Gujarat High Court granted him bail three months after his arrest. However, the next day, when the courts were closed, Justice Aftab Alam took a petition to bar him from entering Gujarat. Shah was thus forcibly exiled from the state from 2010 to 2012. He and his wife moved to a room in Gujarat Bhavan, Delhi. Later, the Supreme Court cancelled his bail on a CBI plea. In September 2012, the Supreme Court granted him bail and allowed him to return to Gujarat. He then contested and won the 2012 Assembly election from the Naranpura constituency. (The Sarkhej constituency had ceased to exist after delimitation.) In 2014, Shah was effectively discharged from the Sohrabuddin case by a special CBI court noting a lack of evidence and political undertones to the accusations.

=== Snoopgate ===
In 2013, Shah was accused of having ordered illegal surveillance on a woman in 2009 during his tenure as a home minister. The investigative websites Cobrapost and Gulail released a set of taped audio conversations between Shah and police officer GL Singhal. The tapes had been submitted to the CBI in the Ishrat Jahan case and were leaked to these portals. The calls detail how the state machinery was used to surveil the woman and the IAS officer Pradeep Sharma (who was suspended by the Gujarat government). In the recordings, both Singhal and Shah repeatedly refer to a higher authority as Saheb, which is believed to be Chief Minister Narendra Modi. Shah denied all the accusations against him; he called them political propaganda by his opponents. The BJP's political opponents demanded a probe in the Snoopgate case. However, in May 2014, the woman approached the Supreme Court and stated that the surveillance on her was based on a "personal request", and she was thankful to the Gujarat government for ensuring her safety. She requested the court to block any investigation, stating it would violate her privacy.

== Rise in national politics ==
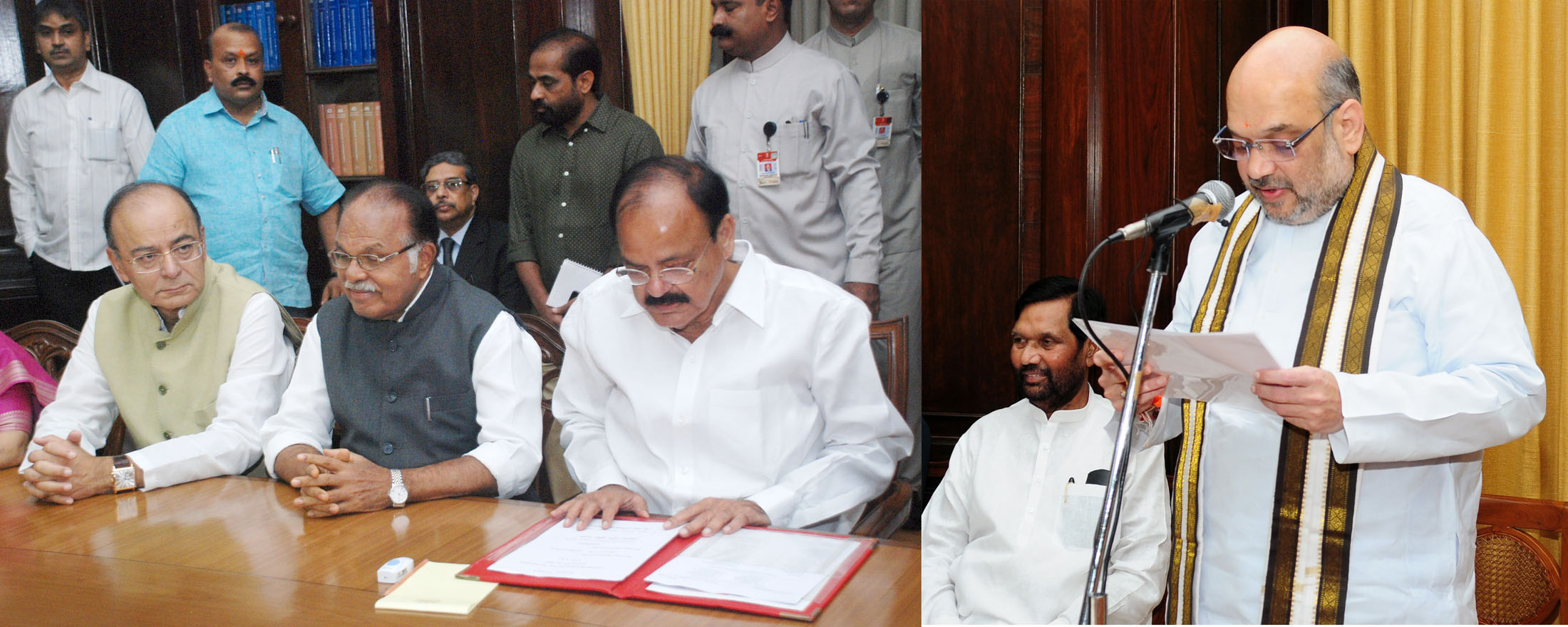
The Vice-President and chairman, Rajya Sabha, M. Venkaiah Naidu administering the oath as Member, Rajya Sabha to Amit Shah

After Modi became the prime-ministerial candidate of the BJP, Shah's influence also increased in the party. They had been accused of sidelining other BJP leaders, such as Lal Krishna Advani, Sushma Swaraj, Murli Manohar Joshi and Jaswant Singh. By this time, Shah had gained recognition as an excellent election campaign manager and was dubbed a "modern-day Chanakya and master strategist". Shah was appointed as a BJP general secretary and given charge of Uttar Pradesh (UP). He was chosen not by Modi, but by Rajnath Singh, who had been impressed by the skills Shah displayed in wresting control of various Congress-controlled organisations in Gujarat. The decision did not go down well with many of the party members, who saw him as a liability owing to the criminal charges against him. Political analyst Shekhar Gupta termed the decision as a blunder.

During his time as a general secretary of the BJP, party members credited Shah with promoting Hindutva, encouraging Hindu voters to reject "protectors of minorities", and opposing Modi's attempts to reconcile with the Muslim community.

=== 2014 general election campaign ===
==== In Uttar Pradesh ====
Shah's political career, which had declined after his arrest in 2010, revived after the BJP's victory in the 2014 general election. In Uttar Pradesh, where Shah was the in-charge, the BJP and its allies won 73 out of 80 seats. Shah had been made in-charge of the BJP's campaign in Uttar Pradesh on 12 June 2013, less than a year before the elections. Since February 2012, Shah had spent considerable time in Uttar Pradesh, where he tried to understand the reasons for the Samajwadi Party's victory in the 2012 UP Assembly elections. Shah realised the voters were dissatisfied with the Samajwadi Party, which he believed had failed to keep its election promises after the win. He also took advantage of the OBC voters' displeasure with the UP government's decision to create a 4.5% reservation for the minorities within the 27% OBC quota in government jobs and education.

Shah oversaw the candidate selection, emphasising the candidate's local popularity and winning potential as the only criteria for selection, as opposed to the candidate's party loyalty or ideology. His team estimated that only 35% of the BJP's traditional supporters had voted in the UP elections. Therefore, he focused on door-to-door campaigning at the booth-level. He set up a 7-to-10 member management committee for each of the 140,000 voting booths in the state. For each booth, his team collated lists of voters and reached out to them. Shah's team used 450 GPS-enabled mobile vans (video raths) to reach out to the masses in remote areas, where media reach was negligible. Shah covered 76 out of the 80 Lok Sabha constituencies. He also insisted on Modi contesting election from Varanasi.

Shah convinced Modi to utilise RSS volunteers for grassroots campaigning, which proved highly beneficial for the BJP. Although the RSS officially were not involved in electioneering, Shah used its volunteers to mobilise and monitor the campaigners. For example, the RSS volunteers would cross-check a BJP worker's claims of having targeted a given number of households. Shah also helped organise "mega rallies" for Modi. Like other major political parties, the BJP provisioned one van per village to transport people to the rally venue. However, unlike others, Shah decided that the BJP would not provide money for hiring these vehicles. Instead, he declared that the party workers organising the transportation would be the leaders of the BJP units in their villages. This strategy ensured several local village leaders developed a stake in Modi's victory.

Critics accused Shah of trying to polarise the UP voters along the religious lines. While visiting Ayodhya for a meeting with the party's local committee, he raised the Ayodhya dispute. The BJP fielded three candidates accused of inciting violence during the 2013 Muzaffarnagar riots. These were seen as attempts to target the party's Hindu nationalist base. An FIR was registered against Shah for a speech in Muzaffarnagar, where he urged the voters to seek "revenge" through their votes. He also took advantage of Shia Muslim antipathy towards Sunni Muslims in Lucknow.

In April 2014, EC barred Shah from conducting any public processions, marches, gatherings and roadshows in Uttar Pradesh due to speeches that were made to outrage the religious feelings and beliefs of different classes.

==== Outside Uttar Pradesh ====
Shah also played an important role in the BJP's election campaigning strategy outside Uttar Pradesh. He focused on building Modi's image as a strong leader. At times, he opposed even Modi on several strategic campaigning issues. For example, when Modi praised his opponent and prospective post-poll ally Mamata Banerjee, Shah insisted that the BJP must not divert from the "Modi-versus-all" tactic. Shah was also responsible for forging the BJP's alliances with regional parties like Pattali Makkal Katchi.

== National President of the BJP (2014–2019) ==
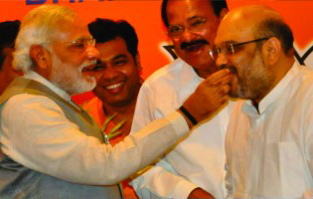
Modi congratulates Shah as he becomes BJP president.

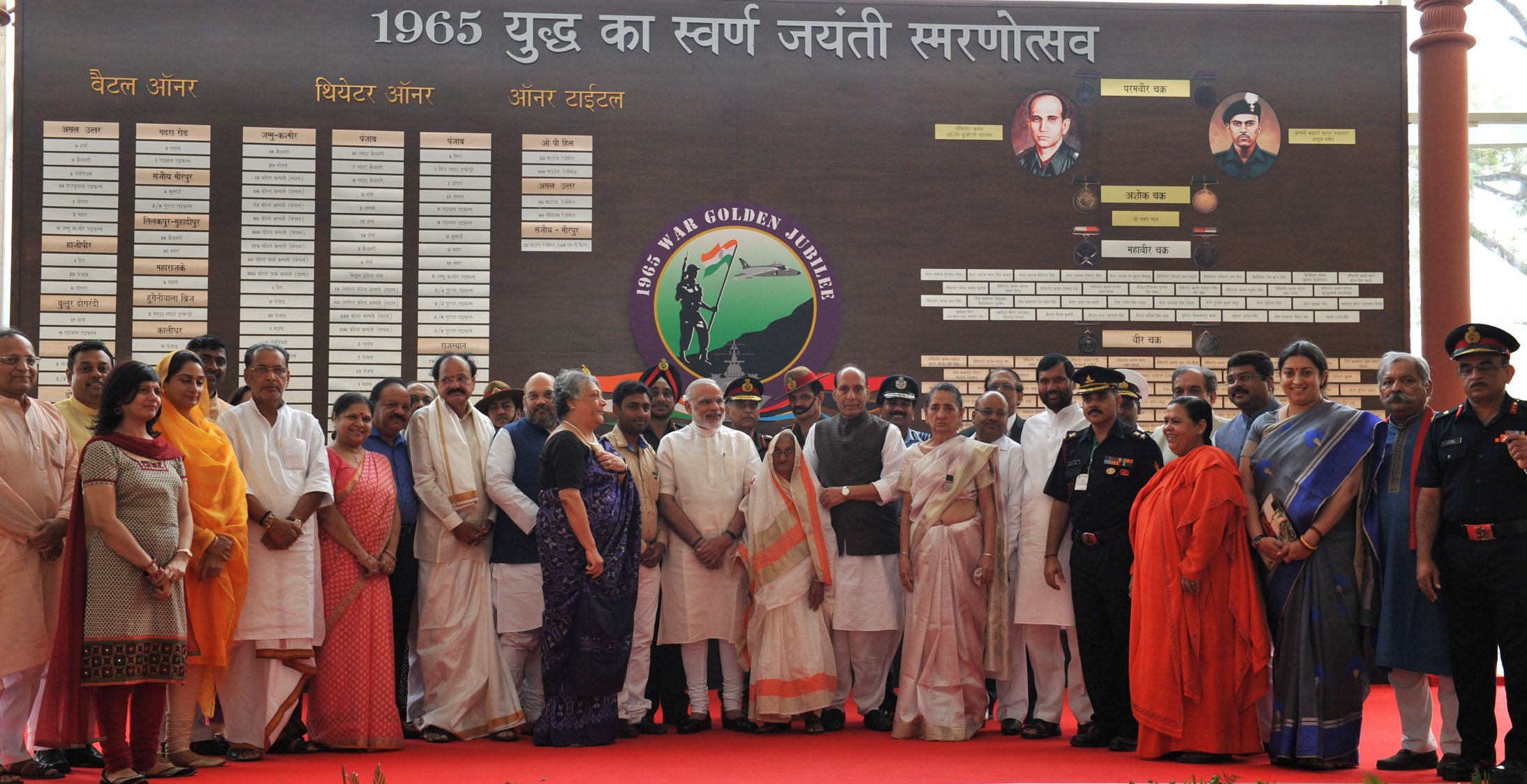
PM Modi visits Shauryanjali, a commemorative exhibition on the 1965 war in 2015

In July 2014, the BJP's central parliamentary board unanimously approved Shah's appointment as president of the party. He was re-elected as the party's president unanimously on 24 January 2016. After becoming the party president, Shah started an aggressive membership drive, and by March 2015, BJP had claimed 100 million members.

In 2014 to 2016, BJP achieved success in Legislative Assembly elections in Maharashtra, Haryana, Jammu & Kashmir, Jharkhand and Assam but lost the elections in Delhi and Bihar.

Shah also spearheaded campaigning in the 2017 assembly elections, which resulted in the party's success in Uttar Pradesh and Uttarakhand. This was the BJP's greatest run in recent elections; they won 312 seats out of 403. The BJP also progressed in Manipur. The BJP won the 2017 Gujarat Legislative Assembly polls for a record six times and wrested power from Congress during the 2017 Himachal Pradesh Legislative Assembly polls. In March 2018, the BJP won for the first time in the left-ruled north-eastern state of Tripura, where they won two-thirds of the votes. The BJP also made gains in Nagaland and Meghalaya and formed a government in both states with its allies.

Shah led the BJP to victory in the 2019 Indian general election; he became the most successful BJP president. During the election campaign, he visited 312 of the 543 Lok Sabha constituencies, holding 18 roadshows, 161 public meetings and over 1,500 BJP meetings. Shah had given BJP workers a seemingly audacious target of crossing 300 seats (Ab ki Baar 300 paar) an initiative he called "Mission 300 Par". The mission was accomplished under his leadership as party president cementing BJP undisputed king of India's political terrain.

He is an admirer of Chanakya and often referred to as a modern-day Chanakya, who had skilfully replaced the Nanda dynasty by the young Chandragupta Maurya. Responding to questions about a portrait of Chanakya at his New Delhi residence in 2016, he said: "[I admire] Chanakya because he was knowledgeable. His sutras are eternal. Economics, politics, and the problem of governance are all there." The Bhagavata Purana is another of his favourite books, which he studied when he was in prison in 2010 in connection with the death of Sohrabuddin Sheikh.

In 2018, Shah said: "Infiltrators are like termites in the soil of Bengal," and regarding the solution of this, stated: "A Bharatiya Janata Party government will pick up infiltrators one by one and throw them into the Bay of Bengal."

== Union Cabinet Minister (2019–present) ==
=== Minister of Home Affairs ===
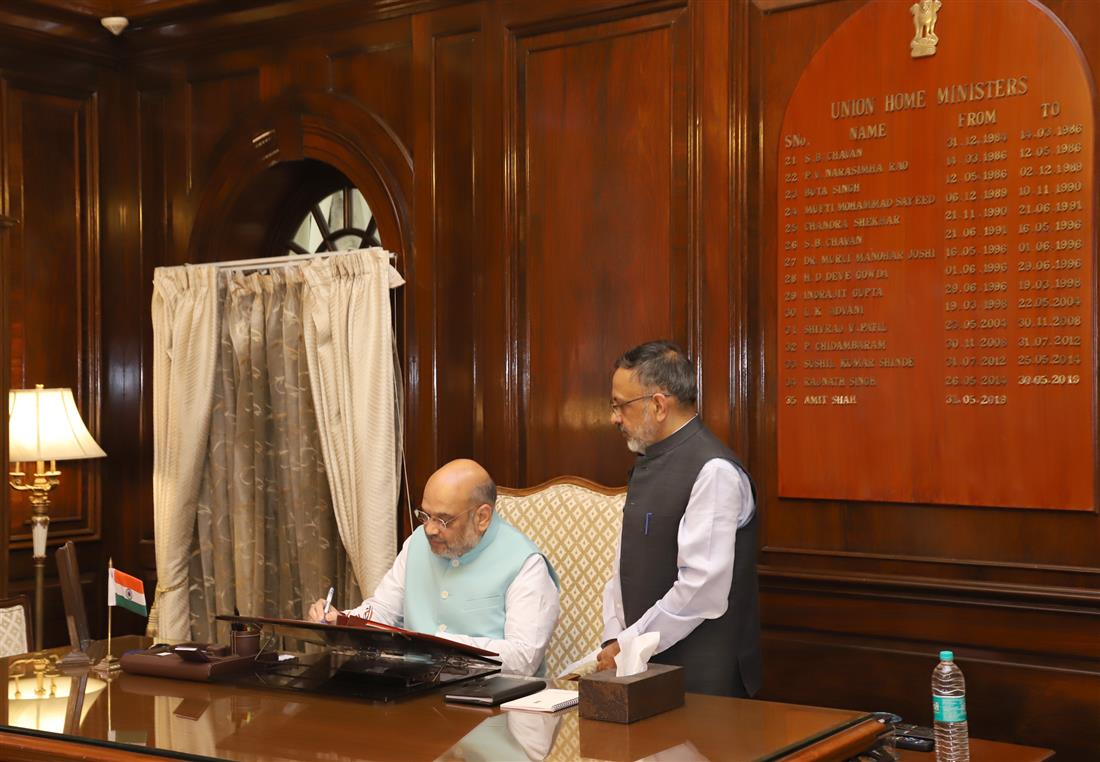
Amit Shah, Union Home Minister taking charge of office, in New Delhi on 1 June 2019. The Union Home Secretary, Rajiv Gauba is also seen.

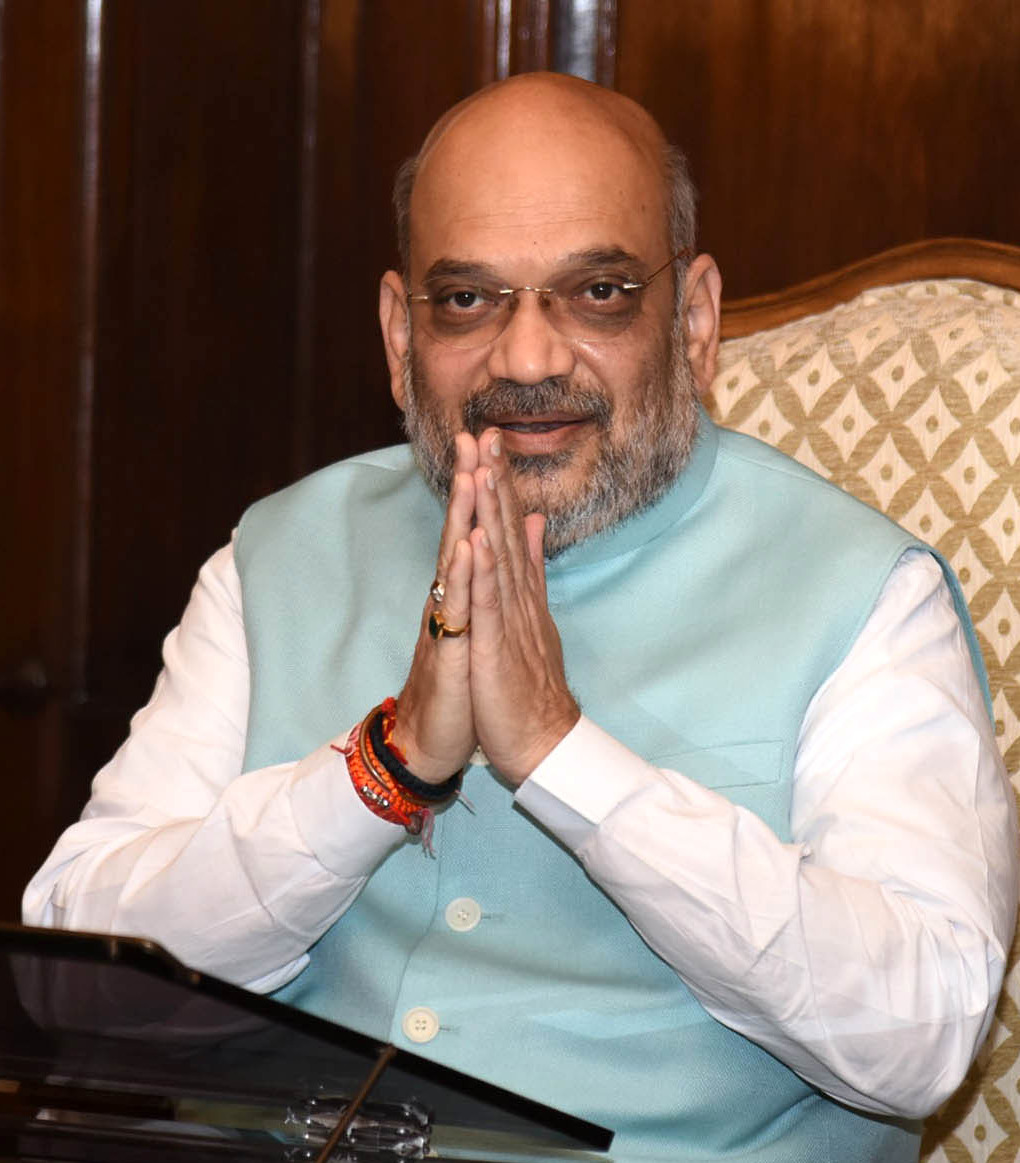
Amit Shah taking charge as the Union Minister for Home Affairs, in New Delhi on 1 June 2019

Shah took oath as Cabinet Minister on 30 May 2019 and took office as Minister of Home Affairs on 1 June 2019.

==== Article 370 ====
On 5 August 2019, Shah moved a resolution to scrap Article 370 in the Rajya Sabha and reorganise the state of Jammu and Kashmir into two, with Jammu and Kashmir serving as one of the union territories, and Ladakh serving as a separate union territory. In September 2019, with reference to the revocation of the special status of Jammu and Kashmir, he stated that it is an important move towards an "Akhand Bharat". On the fourth anniversary of the resolution Shah stated that the union territory has seen positive progress in terms of development and peace. In September 2025, Shah said that following the resolution in 2019, the central government implemented a holistic plan for the union territory which included development, education, poverty reduction, and countering of Pakistan sponsored terrorism. Violence has also reduced.

==== Unifying language ====
In September 2019, Shah talked about how India needs one unifying language; he said the Hindi language should be spoken to unite the country and represent India in the world. In a tweet, he also appealed to the Indian people to increase the use of the Hindi language. In reaction to Amit Shah's statements, Congress said that the three language formula should not be fiddled with. Shah has said that Hindi is a friend to other languages, and not a competitor.

==== NRC and CAA ====
On 19 November 2019, Shah declared in the Rajya Sabha of the Indian parliament that the National Register of Citizens (NRC) would be implemented throughout the country.

In December 2019, he introduced the Citizenship (Amendment) Act, 2019, which grants Indian citizenship to religiously persecuted minority communities who migrated to the country before 2015 from the Muslim-majority countries of Pakistan, Bangladesh and Afghanistan. In Northeast India, the act raised concerns about the impact of immigration on local culture and politics, which caused people to protest against the Act. Elsewhere, the opposition parties criticised the Act's exclusion of Muslims as detrimental to India's pluralism. Shah insisted the bill was not anti-Muslim, because it did not change their existing path to citizenship.

In December 2019, the US Commission on International Religious Freedom (USCIRF) asked the US administration to consider imposing sanctions against Shah if the Indian parliament passed the Citizenship (Amendment) Bill. USCIRF in its statement said: "CAB is a dangerous turn in the wrong direction; it runs counter to India's rich history of secular pluralism and the Indian Constitution, which guarantees equality before the law regardless of faith." The commission said that the CAB "enshrines a pathway to citizenship for immigrants that specifically excludes Muslims, setting a legal criterion for citizenship based on religion". The external affairs ministry issued a counter-statement in response to USCIRF by saying it was not based on facts and the bill was to grant citizenship to persecuted religious minorities who arrived in India and does not aim to strip citizenship.

==== Criminal Procedure (Identification) Bill 2022 ====
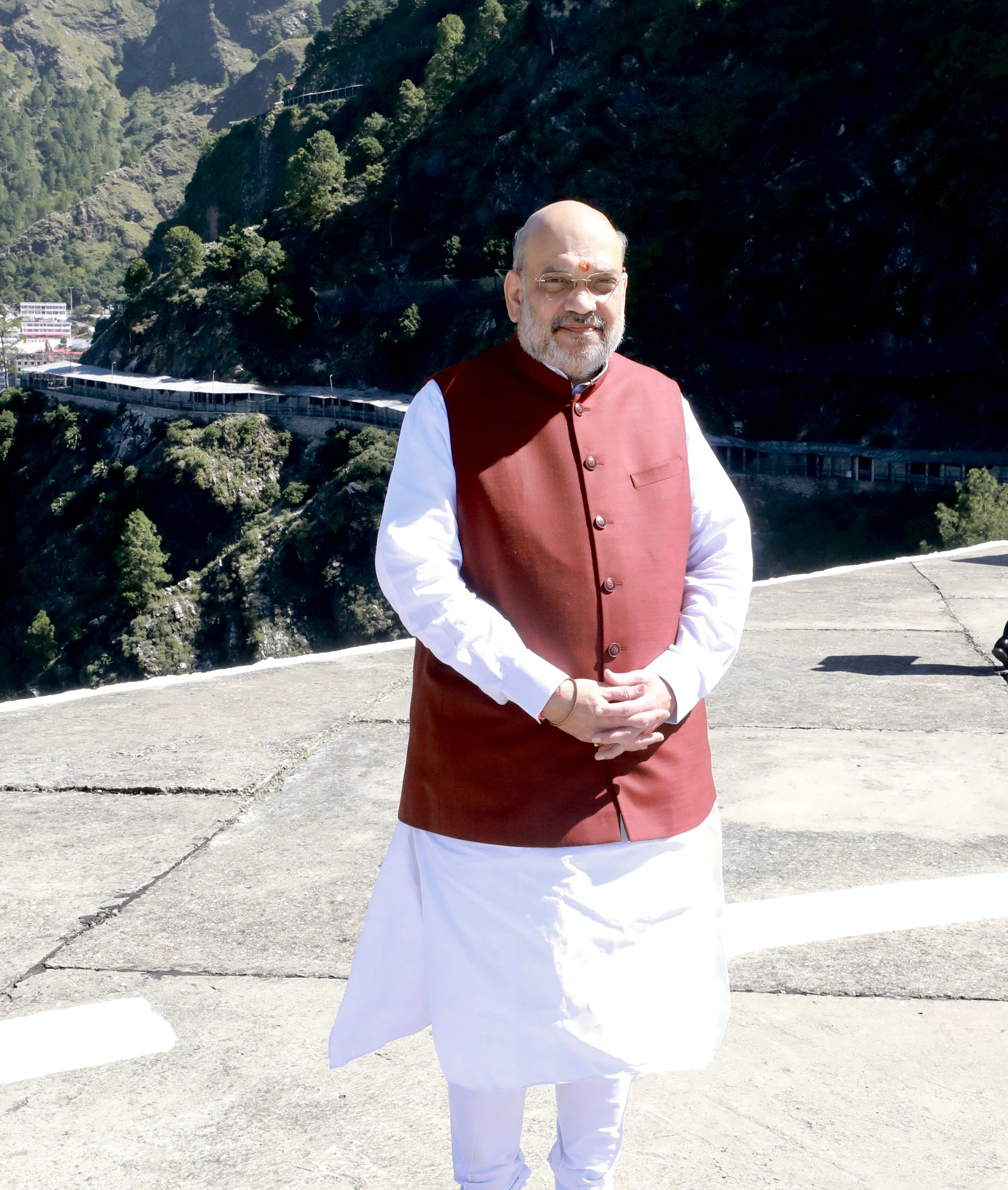
Amit Shah in Vaishno Devi Temple, Katra, Jammu and Kashmir, on 4 October 2022

The bill aims to replace the Identification of Prisoners Act 1920. In the 1980s, the Law Commission of India, in its 87th report, had recommended significant changes to the existing law. The new bill will allow the police and prison authorities to collect, store and analyse physical and biological samples, including retina and iris scans, of convicts and persons arrested on various charges. While moving the bill in the Lok Sabha, Shah said "The Criminal Procedure (Identification) Bill, 2022, will not only fill those obsolete gaps... but it will also widen the scope of evidence for conviction."

==== New criminal laws ====
The Bharatiya Nyaya Sanhita, 2023, the Bharatiya Nagarik Suraksha Sanhita, 2023, and the Bharatiya Sakshya Act, 2023 replace the Indian Penal Code, Code of Criminal Procedure and the Indian Evidence Act. Amit Shah introduced these three new bills on 11 August 2023, which eventually were given assent to by the President on 25 December 2023, and came into force on 1 July 2024.

==== Left wing extremism ====
In March 2025, Amit Shah said that the Naxal insurgency will be tackled by March 2026. In March 2026 in the Lok Sabha, he said that one of the biggest successes of the Modi government is a Naxal-free India. A "whole of government" and "whole of agency" approach was utilised.

==== AFSPA ====
On 27 March 2024, Amit Shah stated that the central government would contemplate the possibility of repealing the Armed Forces (Special Powers) Act (AFSPA) in Jammu and Kashmir. In northeast India, AFSPA is being withdrawn district by district since 2014; in June 2026 Shah stated AFSPA has been removed from 80 per cent of the region. This withdrawal of AFSPA is in the backdrop of improved statistics related to the security situation.

==== Northeast India ====
In continuation of the push for peace in northeast India during the first term of the Modi government, since 2019, various peace agreements and accords have been signed. Nearly 11,000 people have laid down their arms and joined the mainstream. A major setback has been ethnic violence in Manipur.

==== Other ====
In October 2024, the Canadian government alleged that Shah was behind a campaign to intimidate and assassinate members of the Sikh diaspora living in Canada. India's external affairs ministry stated that references to the Union Home Minister in the matter were "absurd and baseless".

== Electoral performance ==
Since 1989, Shah has fought 28 elections to various local bodies.

Election	Year	Constituency	Result	Votes	% of votes	Source
Gujarat Legislative Assembly (by-election)	1997	Sarkhej	Won	76,839	56.10%	
Gujarat Legislative Assembly	1998	Sarkhej	Won	193,373	69.81%	
Gujarat Legislative Assembly	2002	Sarkhej	Won	288,327	66.98%	
Gujarat Legislative Assembly	2007	Sarkhej	Won	407,659	68.00%	
Gujarat Legislative Assembly	2012	Naranpura	Won	103,988	69.19%	
Indian general election	2019	Gandhinagar	Won	888,210	69.76%	
Indian general election	2024	Gandhinagar	Won	10,10,972	76.5%	

== Personal life ==
Shah has six sisters, two of whom live in Chicago. Shah's mother died from an illness on 8 June 2010. He is married to Sonal Shah and the couple have a son named Jay Shah. They have three grandchildren.

In September 2019, he had an operation for lipoma on the back of his neck. On 2 August 2020, Shah tested positive for COVID-19 and was admitted to the hospital.

== See also ==
- Third Modi ministry

Lok Sabha
Preceded by L. K. Advani	Member of Parliament for Gandhinagar; 2019 – Present	Succeeded by Incumbent
Political offices
Preceded by Rajnath Singh	Minister of Home Affairs; 30 May 2019 – Present	Incumbent
Preceded by Ministry did not exist	Minister of Co-operation; 7 July 2021 – Present	Incumbent
Party political offices
Preceded by Rajnath Singh	President of the Bharatiya Janata Party; 2014–2019	Succeeded by J. P. Nadda
