= Harish Chandra (disambiguation) =

Harish Chandra or Harish-Chandra may refer to:

- Harishchandra, a legendary Indian king mentioned in ancient texts
- Harish-Chandra Indian American mathematician and physicist (1923–1983)
  - Harish-Chandra Research Institute
  - Harish-Chandra's c-function
  - Harish-Chandra's regularity theorem
  - Harish-Chandra isomorphism
- Harish C. Mehta Indian historian and academic
- Harish Chandra Postgraduate College
- Harish Chandra Burnwal
- Harish Chandra Mukherjee
- Harish Chandra Singh Rawat
- Harish Chandra Durgapal
- Harish Chandra Patel
- Harish Chandra Mitra
- Harish Chandra (raja)
- Harish Chandra Sarin

== See also ==
- Harishchandra (disambiguation)
