= Sarkhej Assembly constituency =

Former constituency of the Gujarat legislative assembly in India

Coordinates: 22.98°N 72.50°E

Sarkhej
- Former constituency for the Gujarat Legislative Assembly

Constituency details
- Country: India
- Region: Western India
- State: Gujarat
- District: Ahmedabad
- Lok Sabha constituency: Gandhinagar
- Established: 1975
- Abolished: 2008
- Total electors: 1,025,615 (in 2007)
- Reservation: None

Sarkhej was one of the 182 assembly seats of Gujarat's Vidhan Sabha (Gujarat Legislative Assembly), from 1975 until 2012. It was a largely urban seat representing there 1/15 of Ahmedabad. Its abolition, along with others and new replacement seats were drawn up in 2008, in readiness for the next election which proved to be in 2012.

== Members of Legislative Assembly ==
Year	Member	Party
1975	Bhavansinh Chauhan	Bharatiya Jan Sangh
1980	Harishankar Pandya	Indian National Congress (I)
1985	Nalin K. Patel	Indian National Congress
1990	Harishchandra Patel	Bharatiya Janata Party
1995	Harishchandra Patel	Bharatiya Janata Party
1997 (Note: By Poll)	Amit Shah	Bharatiya Janata Party
1998	Amit Shah	Bharatiya Janata Party
2002	Amit Shah	Bharatiya Janata Party
2007	Amit Shah	Bharatiya Janata Party
2012	Seat abolished	

== Election results ==
=== 2007 ===
2007 Gujarat Legislative Assembly election: Sarkhej
Party	Candidate	Votes	%	±%
BJP	Amit Anilchandra Shah	407,659	68.00	
INC	Shashikant V. Patel	1,71,836	28.66	
IND.	Syed Inayathusen Kurmullamirya	8,693	1.45	
BSP	Sureshchandra Bahecharlal Dave	4,923	0.82	
IND.	Prakash Narayanbhai Kumavat	2,753	0.46	
Majority		2,35,823	39.34	
Turnout		5,99,456	58.45	
BJP hold		Swing		

=== 2002 ===
2002 Gujarat Legislative Assembly election: Sarkhej
Party	Candidate	Votes	%	±%
BJP	Amit Anilchandra Shah	288,327	66.97	
INC	Himanshu Patel	1,30,291	30.26	
Majority		1,58,036	36.71	
Turnout		4,30,492	51.31	
BJP hold		Swing		

== See also ==
- Ahmedabad district
- List of constituencies of the Gujarat Legislative Assembly
- Naranpura (Vidhan Sabha constituency)
- Gandhinagar (Lok Sabha constituency)
