= Heris (disambiguation) =

Heris is a city in East Azerbaijan Province, Iran.

Heris (Persian: هريس) may also refer to:

- Heris, Maragheh, a village in East Azerbaijan Province, Iran
- Heris, Marand, a village in East Azerbaijan Province, Iran
- Heris, Sarab, a village in East Azerbaijan Province, Iran
- Heris, Shabestar, a village in East Azerbaijan Province, Iran
- Heris, Ardabil, a village in Ardabil Province, Iran
- Heris County, an administrative subdivision of Iran
