= Harish, Iran =

Harish (Persian: هاريش) in Iran may refer to:

- Harish, South Khorasan
- Harish, Zanjan
