= Naranpura Assembly constituency =

Legislative Assembly constituency in Gujarat State, India

Coordinates: 23.06°N 72.55°E

Naranpura
- Constituency No. 45 for the Gujarat Legislative Assembly

Constituency details
- Country: India
- Region: Western India
- State: Gujarat
- District: Ahmedabad
- Lok Sabha constituency: Gandhinagar
- Established: 2008
- Total electors: 250,238
- Reservation: None

Member of Legislative Assembly
- 15th Gujarat Legislative Assembly
- Incumbent Jitendrakumar Patel (Jitu Bhagat)
- Party: BJP
- Elected year: 2022

Naranpura is one of the 182 Legislative Assembly constituencies of Gujarat state in India. It is part of Ahmedabad district. This seat came into existence after 2008 delimitation and it is one of the seven assembly seats which make up Gandhinagar Lok Sabha constituency.

== List of segments ==
This assembly seat represents the following segments,

1. Ahmedabad City Taluka (Part) – Ahmedabad Municipal Corporation (Part) Ward No. – 11, 12, 13, 14.

== Members of the Legislative Assembly ==
Election	Member	Party
2012	Amit Shah	Bharatiya Janata Party
2017	Kaushik Patel	Bharatiya Janata Party
2022	Jitendrakumar Ramanlal Patel	Bharatiya Janata Party

== Election results ==
=== 2022 ===
Gujarat Assembly election, 2022: Naranpura Assembly constituency
Party	Candidate	Votes	%	±%
BJP	Jitendrakumar Patel	108,160	77.48	
INC	Sonal Ramanbhai Patel	15,360	11.00	
AAP	Pankajbhai Jayantilal Patel	11,785	8.44	
NOTA	None of the above	2,637	1.89	
Majority		92,800	66.48	
Turnout				
Registered electors		248,816		
BJP hold		Swing		

=== 2017 ===
Gujarat Legislative Assembly Election, 2017: Naranpura
Party	Candidate	Votes	%	±%
BJP	Kaushikbhai Jamnadas Patel	106,458	69.71	+0.46
INC	Nitinbhai Kantibhai Patel	40,243	26.35	−0.72
BSP	Ravi Khengarbhai Vaghela	1,284	0.84	−0.07
IND.	Himanshu Vikrambhai Shah	592	0.39	−0.60
IND.	Jitendrasing Dalelsing Shikh	329	0.22	+0.22
NOTA	None of the Above	2,867	1.88	+1.88
Majority		66,215	43.36	+1.18
Turnout		1,52,723	66.45	−3.76
BJP hold		Swing	+0.46	

=== 2012 ===
Gujarat Legislative Assembly Election, 2012: Naranpura
Party	Candidate	Votes	%	±%
BJP	Amit Anilchandra Shah	103,988	69.25	
INC	Dr. Jitubhai B. Patel	40,653	27.07	
Majority		63,335	42.18	
Turnout		1,50,160	70.21	
BJP win (new seat)				

== See also ==
- List of constituencies of the Gujarat Legislative Assembly
- Ahmedabad district
- Sarkhej Assembly constituency
