= Dinanath Sen =

Bengali writer (1839 or 1840–1898)

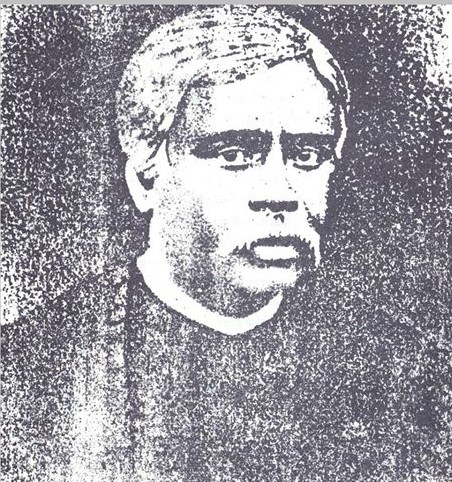
- Born: 1839/1840; Manikganj, Dhaka
- Died: 1898 (aged 57–58)
- Education: Dhaka College
- Known for: Social reformer and journalist
- Movement: Brahmo Samaj

Dinanath Sen (1839/1840–1898) was a Bengali social reformer and journalist. He played an important role in the education and cultural spheres of 19th-century Dhaka. He served as the second editor of the first Bengali newspaper in Dhaka, Dhaka Prakash.

== Early life ==
Sen was born in 1839/1840 in the village of Dashora, Manikganj District. His father was Golaknath, and his mother was Dayamoyee. Due to his father's work in Comilla, he initially studied at Comilla Zilla School. Later, he attended Dhaka College for higher education.

== Career ==
From 1861 to 1864, Dinanath served as the headmaster of Pogose School, becoming its first Bengali principal. In 1866, he began teaching at Dhaka Collegiate School and later worked as a deputy inspector of schools in East Bengal. Along with others, he helped establish Dhaka's first Bengali newspaper, Dhaka Prakash. The paper's first editor was Krishna Chandra Majumder, and Dinanath subsequently took on the editorial role. In 1858, he was among the founders of Dhaka's Brahmo School (now Jagannath University), the Sthri Shiksha Sabha, and Eden School.

In 1866, Dinanath proposed building a Brahmo worship center in Dhaka. Following this proposal, a nine-member construction committee was formed on 25 August 1866, with Dinanath as its general secretary. This led to the establishment of the Brahmo Samaj Temple in Dhaka. He purchased land in the Gendaria area and built his residence there, initiating the development of the Gendaria residential area. He founded Antahpur Stree Shiksha Shabha, a school for housewives of "gentlemen".

== Legacy ==
A street in Gendaria is named "Dinanath Sen Road" in his honor. It was renamed after the fall of the Sheikh Hasina led Awami League government after Shahriar Khan Anas, who was killed protesting against the government of Sheikh Hasina.

== Literary works ==
Dinanath authored several books, including:

- Shikshadan Pranali (Method of Teaching)
- Manasik Ganana (Mental Calculations)
- Bongodesh O Ashamer Songkhipto Biboron (Brief Description of Bengal and Assam)

== Personal life ==
Dinanath's son was Adinath Sen, whose son Dibakar Sen married the renowned Bengali actress Suchitra Sen. The couple's daughters are Moon Moon Sen, whose children include Raima Sen and Riya Sen.
