= The Dacca News =

- Type: Weekly newspaper
- Publisher: Dhaka Press
- Editor: Alexander Forbes
- Founded: 18 April 1856

The Dacca News was the first English periodical in eastern Bengal. It was a weekly English newspaper and was first published on 18 April 1856. The newspaper was published from Dhaka Press, whose owners were English, Armenian and Kashmiri. The editor of the newspaper was Alexander Forbes, a Scottish citizen.

== History and profile ==
The Dhaka News was published on every Saturday. Its main topic was indigo plantation, but it also covered regional issues. The Dacca News cost two annas per issue, or two and half taka for a yearly subscription.

At first the newspaper was of one page. From the 13th publication, the page number increased to four and a supplement was added where market price was published. In the second edition, total page number was eight.

The newspaper was published for thirteen years and the publication stopped in 1869. Some historians say that Dhaka News had lately changed its name and started its publication as the 'Bengal Times'.

== See also ==
- History of printing and publishing in Dhaka
