= Arish (disambiguation) =

Arish or El Arish is the capital and largest city of the North Sinai Governorate and the Sinai Peninsula in Egypt.

Arish may also refer to:

== People ==
=== Given name ===
- Arisha Razi, a Pakistani television actress and host
- Arish Kumar, an Indian film actor in Tamil cinema
- Arish Alam, an Indian first-class cricketer for Uttar Pradesh
- Arish Ali Khan (born 2000), Pakistani cricketer

=== Surname ===
- Or Arish (died 2017), a victim of the 2017 Har Adar shooting
- Yousif Bu Arish (born 2000), Saudi Arabian swimmer

== Places ==
- Related to the Egyptian city:
  - El Arish International Airport
  - Wady el-'Arish, an ephemeral stream
  - El Arish-Ashkelon pipeline
- El Arish, Queensland, a small town and locality in the Cassowary Coast Region of Queensland, Australia
  - El Arish–Mission Beach Road
- Arish, Iran, a village in Khusf Rural District, Central District, Khusf County, South Khorasan Province, Iran
- Al-ʽArish, Qatar, an abandoned village
- Arish Mell, a small embayment and beach between Mupe and Worbarrow bays in Dorset, England, part of the Jurassic Coast
- Abu 'Arish, a city in Jizan, Saudi Arabia

== See also ==
- Convention of El Arish (1800), treaty between France and the Ottoman Empire
- Arish attack (disambiguation)
- Arish hotel bombing, a 2015 terrorist attack on a hotel in Arish, Egypt
- Arishadvargas or shadripu/shada ripu (the latter meaning "six enemies"), six enemies of the mind in Hinduism: kama (lust), krodha (anger), lobha (greed), Mada (pride), moha (attachment), and matsarya (jealousy)
- Arishadvarga, an Indian Kannada-language neo-noir mystery thriller film by Arvind Kamath
- Arishina Kumkuma, a 1970 Indian Kannada-language film by K. S. L. Swamy
- Harish (disambiguation)
