= Krishna Chandra Majumder =

Bengali Poet

Krishna Chandra Majumder (Bengali: কৃষ্ণচন্দ্র মজুমদার) was a 19th-century Bengali poet and writer.

== Early life ==
Majumder was born in June 1834 in Senhati, Khulna District, Bengal Presidency, British India. He studied Sanskrit and Persian languages. His father, Manikya Chandra Majumder, died when he was six months old. After struggling financially with his mother, Brahmamayi Devi, he had to go and live with his paternal great-grandfather Prasanna Kumar.

== Career ==
Majumder joined Kirtipasha Bengali School as the head teacher in 1854. He joined Dhaka Normal School as a teacher but resigned over disagreements with management. In 1860, he worked as the editor of Manoravjika and Kavitakusumavali, a poetry magazine based in Dhaka. Next year, in 1861, he joined the Dhaka Prakash as its editor. In 1861, he published Sadbhabashatak, his notable poem based on Mahabharata but influenced by Persian poets.

In joined the Bijnapani, a weekly magazine, in 1865. He published his autobiography in 1868 titled Raser Itibrtta. He left journalism and return to teaching after a few years. In 1874, Majumder joined Jessore Zilla School as the head teacher. In 1886, he published Dvaibhasiki magazine from Jessore. He retired in 1893. He published Kaivalyatattva, his treatise on philosophy in 1883.

== Death ==
Majumder died on 13 January 1907.
