= Harishchandra (disambiguation) =

Harishchandra is an Indian king mentioned in ancient Hindu religious texts.

Harishchandra may also refer to:

== Films ==
=== Based on the life of Harishchandra ===
- Raja Harishchandra, a 1913 Marathi silent film directed by Dadasaheb Phalke
- Satyavadi Raja Harishchandra, a 1917 Marathi silent short film directed by Dadasaheb Phalke
- Satyawadi Raja Harishchandra, a 1917 Bengali silent film directed by Rustomji Dhotiwala
- Harishchandra (1932 film), a 1932 Tamil film directed by Raja Chandrasekhar and Sarvottam Badami
- Satya Harishchandra (1943 film), a Kannada film directed by R. Nagendra Rao
- Harischandra (1944 film), a Tamil film directed by K. Nagabhushanam
- Satya Harishchandra (1951 film), a 1951 Nepali-language film
- Harishchandra (1955 film), a Malayalam film directed by Anthony Mithradas
- Satya Harishchandra (1965 Kannada film), a Kannada film directed by Hunsur Krishnamurthy
- Satya Harishchandra (1965 Telugu film), a Telugu film directed by K. V. Reddy
- Harichandra (1968 film), a Tamil film directed by K. S. Prakash Rao

=== Other films ===
- Harichandra (1998 film), a 1998 Tamil film directed by Cheyyar Ravi
- Harischandraa, a remake of the above, a 1999 Telugu-language romance film directed by Thulasi Kumar
- Harishchandrachi Factory, a 2009 Marathi film depicting the struggle of Dadasaheb Phalke in making Raja Harishchandra
- Satya Harishchandra (2017 film), a 2017 Kannada film directed by Dayal Padmanabhan

== People ==
=== Politicians ===
- Harischandra Devram Chavan (born 1951, member of the 15th Lok Sabha of India
- Harishchandra Patil, Indian politician and member of the Bharatiya Janata Party
- Tejlal Tambhare Harishchandra, Indian politician from the state of the Madhya Pradesh

=== Other people ===
- Bandula Harischandra (1963–2025), Sri Lankan politician and governor of Southern Province
- Bharatendu Harishchandra (1850-1885), Indian novelist, poet, playwright, and father of modern Hindi literature
- Harishchandra (Gahadavala dynasty), Indian king who reigned from 1194 to 1197 CE
- Harishchandra Abeygunawardena, vice-chancellor of University of Peradeniya from 2006 to 2009
- Harishchandra Birajdar (1950–2011), wrestler and wrestling coach from India

== Other ==
- Harischandra Mills, a Sri Lankan food processing company named after its founder, C. A. Harischandra

== See also ==
- Harish Chandra (disambiguation)
- Harichandra (disambiguation)
