= Arish attack =

Arish attack may refer to:

== Terrorist incidents ==
- 2015 Arish attack, terrorist attack on 24 November 2015
- 2016 Arish attack, terrorist attack on 20 March 2016
- 2017 Arish attack, terrorist attack on 24 November 2017

== Military incidents ==
- Battle of El Arish (1967)
- Siege of El Arish (1799)
- Second Siege of El Arish (1799)

== See also ==
- Arish (disambiguation)
