= Harichandra =

Harichandra may refer to:

- Harishchandra, short form of Harish Chandra (in Tamil)
- Harichandra (1944 film), a Tamil film directed by Naga Bushwanam and starring P. U. Chinnappa and P. Kannamba
- Harichandra (1968 film), a Tamil film directed by K. S. Prakash Rao and starring Sivaji Ganesan and G. Varalakshmi
- Harichandra (1998 film), a Tamil film directed by Cheyyar Ravi and starring Karthik and Meena

== See also ==
- Harishchandra (disambiguation)
