= Kavitakusumavali =

Kavitakusumavali (Bengali: কবিতাকুসুমাবলী) was the first poetry magazine published in Dhaka in what is today Bangladesh.

== History ==
Kavitakusumavali was established in May 1860. Krishna Chandra Majumder was the first editor of the magazine. Harish Chandra Mitra and Prasannakumar Sen were the other founding editors. The magazine was sold for one and half anna. The magazine continued to be published till 1872. It had 400 subscribers.
