= Dhaka Prakash =

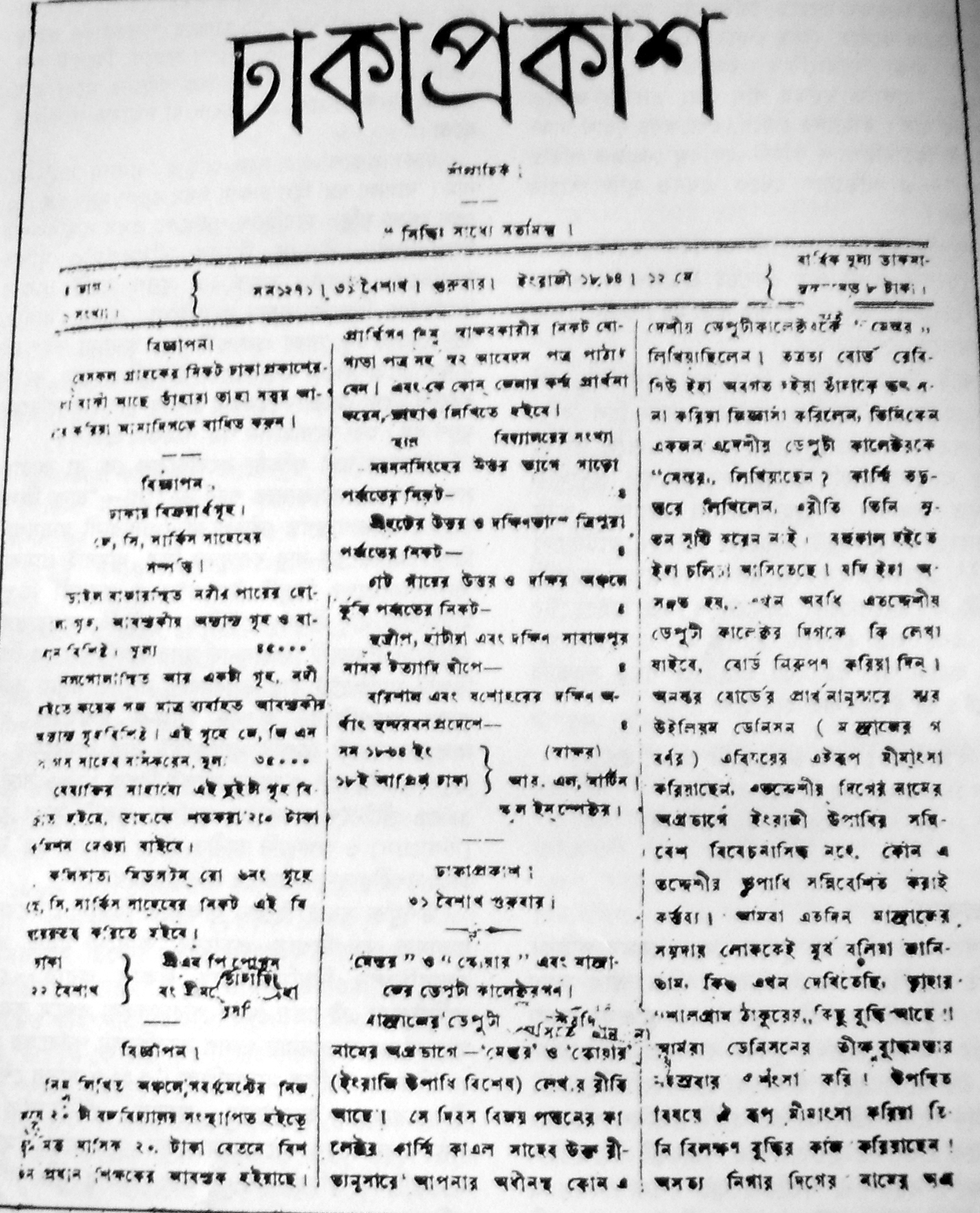
The first page of an issue of Dhaka Prakash, dated c. 1863–64.

Dhaka (Dacca) Prakash (Bengali: ঢাকা প্রকাশ) was the first Bengali language newspaper published in Dhaka, capital of East Bengal (present-day Bangladesh). First published in 1861, the newspaper remained in publication for about a century. No other newspaper in the East Bengal remained active for such a long time.

Although Dhaka Prakash initially served as a tool to promote and exchange issues of the Brahma Samaj, its policies and orientation transformed as ownership changed through the years. The newspaper played an important role to chronicle the social, cultural, and political developments of the region.

During the first two decades, the newspaper promoted the liberal social messages of eminent members of the Brahma Samaj in Dhaka. However, when ownership changed, the newspaper started supporting the viewpoint of orthodox Hindus. In terms of political issues, in the first half of the nineteenth century, the paper took a middle position most of the time. As a result, the newspaper experienced obstacles during the Partition of Bengal and Swadeshi Movement in Bengal.

The Bengali poet Krishna Chandra Majumder was the first editor of the paper. Other long-term editors were Govindan Prasad Roy, Garganega Aich Chowdhury, and Mukund Bihari Chakrabarty.

== Profile ==
Dacca Prokash was first published on 7 March 1861 (24h Falgun, 1267 Bengali Year) from the printing press Bangala Jantra in Babu Bazar. The annual charge including postage cost was 5 Taka. In the beginning, it was published weekly every Thursday, after which it came out on Fridays and ultimately on Sundays from its fifth year of publication. The newspapers' popularity lead to its growth from an initial circulation of 250 to 5000 during the Hindu Revivalism in Bengal in the nineties.

Dacca Prokash was printed by the hand-operated 'Chila' or Columbian press. in 1863, an advertisement in the newspaper listed the per forma cost of six taka for Bengali printing and five taka for English printing.

== History ==
The publishing of Dhaka Prokash is intricately connected to Dhaka's first Bengali printers 'Bangala Jontro'. One account suggests that the owner of the printers were Brajasundar Mitra (deputy magistrate and resident of Tetuljhora village), Bhagawan Chandra Bose (deputy magistrate resident of Rarhikhal, Bikrampur who was also the father of Jagadish Chandra Bose, and Kashikanta Mukhopadhyay. Other accounts suggest that the founders also included: Dinabandhu Moulik (deputy inspector of Dhamrai's schools), Ishwarchandra Basu (school teacher of Collegiate school) and Ramkumar Basu (deputy magistrate and resident of Malkha). As spokespersons of Brahma Samaj, the owners of the printing press started publishing the monthly magazine Monoronjika, which became the first Bengali magazine in East Bengal. However, when the magazine was shut down due to disagreement related to Bengal's Indigo revolt, some of them became determined to publish the weekly newspaper which led to the existence of Dacca Prokash in 1861.

Among the directors of Dhaka Prokash were Brajasundar Mitra, Dinabandhu Moulik, Ishwarchandra Basu, Chandrakanta Basu and others. It is said that Dinabandhu Moulik's patronage was primarily crucial for the newspaper's success. The first editor was Krishna Chandra Majumder, a well-known nineteenth century poet of East Bengal. The second editor was Dinanath Sen, who later became a prominent social reformer and journalist. After that, editorial responsibilities were carried on by Jagannath Agnihotri, Govinda Prasad Roy, Anath Bandhu Moulik (teacher of Dhaka Brahma School) and Pundit Baikuntha nath.

In the fifth year of the newspaper, Govinda Prasad Roy bought the ownership of the newspaper and became its editor. When Queen Victoria attained the Imperial Order of the Crown of India in 1878, he received the invitation to the royal ceremony in Delhi to represent Dhaka Prokash.

In 1883, after the death of Govinda Prasad Roy, his son-in-law Yadavchandra Sen ran the newspaper for two years but struggled to keep up with the competitors. In 1885, Talukdar Babu Guruganga Aich Chowdhury (resident of Charipara, Bikrampur) acquired the copyright of the newspaper for 3450 Taka. He appointed the then renowned poet Dinesh Chandra Bose as the editor for a salary of 50Taka. He also moved the office of the newspaper from Babu Bazar to 16, Islampur. However, when the appointed editor resigned after two months, Guruganga himself took charge of the newspaper's editorial duties. Under his editorship for the next 16 years, Dhaka Prokash conveyed the values of orthodox Hindus. Towards the end, three lawsuits were filed against the newspaper by Secretary of the Dhaka Metropolitan, Ruplal Saha (an influential resident of Dhaka at the time), and the copyright holder of Shaheen Medical Hall. Although Guruganga reached an out-of-court settlement for the first two lawsuits, he went to jail for a month as a result of the third lawsuit. These legal issues along with financial struggles lead him to sell the newspaper.

In 1901, the newspaper was bought by Mukunda Bihari Chakrabarty, B.A. from Brahman Kham Bikrampur and Radharaman Ghosh, B.A., a retired secretary of Niradchandra Manikya, the late Maharaj of independent Tripura. Anecdotes suggest that Radharaman bought the newspaper after an incident where Surendranath Banerjee, editor of The Bengalee in Calcutta, insinuated that no newspaper in Dhaka were of quality worth reading. Soon after, Mukunda Bihari Chakrabarty, took sole responsibility of running the newspaper and also became an editor. In 1902, the newspaper changed its dimensions to double crown size. For the next thirty years, those who assisted Mukund Bihari included Pundit Rajkumar Chakrabarty, Pundit Priyanath Vidyabhusan, Nishikanta Ghosh, Girijakanta Ghosh, Umeshchandra Bose, Harihar Gangapadhyay, Madhusudan Chowdhury, and Purnachandra Bhattcharja. During this tenure, the newspaper continued to take a centrist stance with the goal to promote balance between the government and the citizens. As a result, the newspaper experienced obstacles during the 1905 Partition of Bengal and Swadeshi Movement.

The Dhaka University Library has an archive of many issues of Dhaka Prokash. The last available issue here exhibits the date April 12, 1959 published from 59/3 Kitab Manzil, Islampur, and Abdur Rashid Khan as the editor. However, the newspaper started losing its popularity from the 1940s. During its final days, the newspaper mostly published auction advertisements.

== Role and influence ==
As the first and one of the leading newspapers of East Bengal, Dacca Prokash harboured substantial influence as a mouthpiece and representative of the educated Bengalis in the region. It promoted independent thinking and prioritized news related to women's education, communication, agriculture etc. The Bengal Presidency government also considered the paper as an important voice. The weekly publication Report on Native Papers, that translated selected articles from Bengali newspapers, also widely quoted Dacca Prokash in the nineteenth century.

In 1860, the opinion leaders of the newspaper took a strong stance against the government's cut of expenditure budget of degree-level education in Bengal. At various times, the newspaper advocated for issues important for Dhaka city and Eats Bengal. For example, it focused on the demand of medical school in Dacca, improved supply of water, and policy changes for the Dhaka Municipality.

"Dacca Prokash O Purbobonger Shomaj 1863-64", the most comprehensive research on the newspaper, emphasized on its vital role as a social, political, and intellectual representation of Dhaka in the 1860s, and 1870s. As most intellectual and literary activities of Bengal reformation were based in Calcutta, the newspaper helped to revive, record, and advocate for social changes in Dhaka. The residents here were presented with a platform that could compete with publications in Calcutta. An article published in a newspaper of Kolkata named Purnochondrodoy praised the newspaper:

"...Dhaka Prokash are second to none than any Bengali weekly newspapers published in Calcutta..."

Dhaka Prokash also contributed to the development of journalists and social reformers of the time.

== Legacy ==
For around a century, Dacca Prokash disseminated the regional news, represented the voice of the people of East Bengal, and influenced the public opinion of the educated Bengalis. Additionally, the newspaper was a pioneer to build the journalism culture in the later part of the eighteenth century. In the beginning, the newspaper promoted the liberal messages of social change advocated by the Brahma Samaj in Dhaka at the time.

This pioneer newspaper also prompted the publishing of other newspapers in Dhaka like Dhaka Gazette (1861), Dhaka Darpan (1863), and Dhaka Darshak (1875)

Although, no longer in print, the newspaper continues to be important source of contemporary perspectives on historical accounts of the nineteenth and twentieth century. Bangladeshi historian Muntasir Mamoon conducted extensive research on Dacca Prokash to record the archived accounts of Dhaka's history. Scholars and historians continue to excavate the happenings of the times through its printed accounts.

== See also ==
- List of newspapers in Bangladesh
