= Haris (surname) =

Haris is a surname. Notable people with the surname include:

- Mohammad Haris (born 2001), Pakistani cricketer
- N. A. Haris (born 1967), Indian businessman and politician
- Niki Haris (born 1962), American singer, actress and dancer
- Parvez Haris (born 1964), Bangladeshi professor of biomedical science
