= Bharatendu Harishchandra Awards =

Indian Award

The Ministry of Information and Broadcasting of India confers this award to encourage original and creative writing in Hindi.

== Categories ==
The awards were established in 1983 to honour the legacy of Bharatendu Harishchandra, who played a pivotal role in the renaissance of the Hindi language and literature during the 19th century. Initially, the awards were conferred in the field of Journalism and Mass Communication to recognize exceptional contributions to these domains.

In 1992, the scope of the awards was expanded to include three additional categories:

1. National Integration 2. Women’s Issues 3. Children’s Literature

This expansion reflected the evolving focus on addressing diverse and significant themes through Hindi literature.

== Previous Awardees ==
Year	Category	Awardee(s)	Book/Work	Prize
2001	Journalism & Mass Communication	Ajay Kumar Singh	Media Itihas Aur Hashiye Ke Log	First Prize
2001	Journalism & Mass Communication	Satendra Sharat	Radio Natak	Second Prize
2001	Journalism & Mass Communication	Krishna Chandra Beri	Prakashak Nama	Third Prize
2001	Children’s Literature	Ramesh Tailang	Hari Bhari Dharti	First Prize
2001	Children’s Literature	Devendra Mevadi	Faslein Kahen Kahani	Second Prize
2001	Women’s Issues	Kumari Anjali	Mahila Asmita Aur Apradh	First Prize
2001	Women’s Issues	Vandana Saxena	Mahilaon Ka Sansar Aur Adhikar	Second Prize
2004	Journalism & Mass Communication	Dr. Ashok Jerath	Yeh Akashwani Hai	First Prize
2004	National Integration	Gulshan Rai	Purvottar Bharat Darshan Aur Chintan	First Prize
2004	Women’s Issues	Ramnika Gupta	Stree Vimarsh: Kalam Aur Kudal Ke Bahane	First Prize
2004	Children’s Literature	Surya Kumar Pandey	Chauka-Chakka	First Prize
2005	Journalism & Mass Communication	Dr. Gyan Prakash Pandey	Jansanchar: Sidhant Evam Shodh	First Prize
2011	Journalism & Mass Communication	Vijay Dutt Shridhar	Pehla Sampadakiya	First Prize
2012	Journalism & Mass Communication	Vijaya Lakshmi Sinha	Maine Awaaz ko Dekha	First Prize
2012	Children’s Literature	Dr. Mohammed Arshad Khan	Mickey Mouse	First Prize
2012	Women’s Issues	Urmila Kumari	Jaar Jaar Taar Taar	First Prize
