= Charipara =

Coordinates: 20°27′N 84°24′E

- Village
- India Flag
- Interactive map of Charipara
- Country: India
- State: Tripura
- District: West Tripura
- Sub-district: Dukli

Population (2011)
  - Total: 17,306
- Time zone: UTC+05:30 (IST)
- ISO 3166 code: IN-TR
- Website: tripura.gov.in

Charipara is a large village located in the West Tripura District, Tripura, India. The population is 17,306. 8,839 people are male. 8,467 people are female.
