= Dhaka Press =

Dhaka's first printing press

Dhaka Press Dhaka's first printing press established at Chhota Katra in Dhaka. It was called the old press of Bengal, which later came to be known as 'Dhaka Press'. The Dacca News newspaper was published from here.

== History ==
The first printing press was established in Bengal in 1777. An Englishman, Alexander Farbekh, was the first to set up a printing press in Dhaka. In 1848, a small-scale printing press was established at Chhotakatra in Old Dhaka. This printing press was established by Baptist missionaries. Dhaka Press did not have Bengali typing. Everything was printed in English. A newspaper called 'Dhaka News' was published by Dhaka Press. Most of the sources call it the first press of Dhaka. Earlier it is also known about the establishment of a press in Dhaka in 1848.
