= Heris, Marand =

Heris هريس
- Village
- Location within Iran
- Coordinates: 38°40′47″N 45°57′17″E
- Country: Iran
- Province: East Azerbaijan
- County: Marand
- Bakhsh: Central
- Rural District: Zonuzaq

Population (2006)
  - Total: 93
- Time zone: UTC+3:30 (IRST)
  - Summer (DST): UTC+4:30 (IRDT)

Heris (Persian: هريس, also Romanized as Herīs) is a village in Zonuzaq Rural District, in the Central District of Marand County, East Azerbaijan Province, Iran. At the 2006 census, its population was 93, in 26 families.
