= Rangapur Barttabaha =

First Bangla weekly newspaper published from East Bengal

Rangapur Bartabaha রঙ্গপুর বার্তাবহ
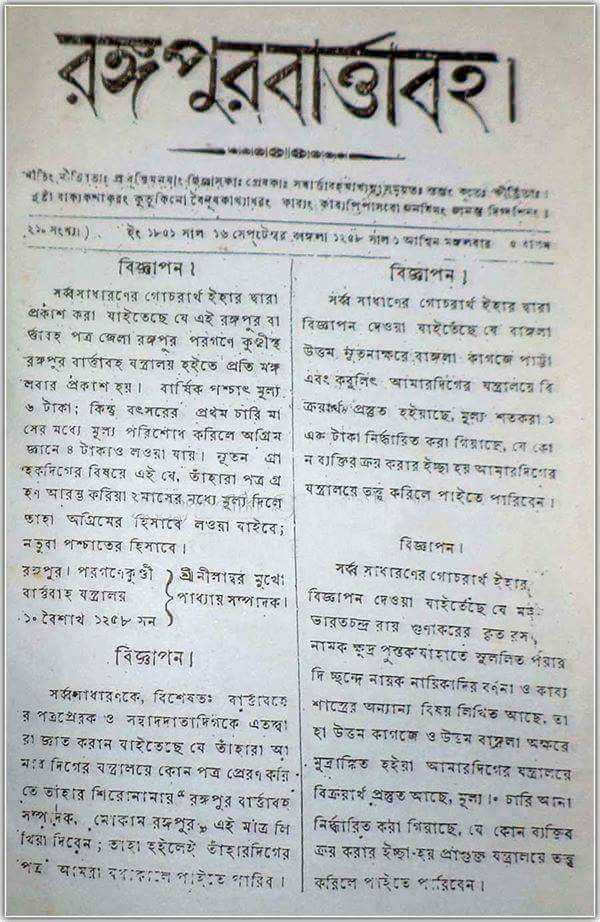
- Type: Weekly newspaper
- Format: Broadsheet
- Founder(s): Kalichandra Ray
- Editor: Gurucharan Sharma Roy
- Founded: 1847; 178 years ago
- Language: Bengali
- Ceased publication: 1854
- Headquarters: Rangpur, Company Raj (Now Bangladesh)
- Circulation: 100 (before 1954)

Rangapur Bartabaha (Bengali: রঙ্গপুর বার্ত্তাবহ) was a weekly newspaper published in East Bengal. It was published from August 1847 (Bhadra, 1254 BS) until 1854 with funding from Kalichandra Ray, the zamindar of Pargana Kundi. It was the first Bangla weekly newspaper published in East Bengal.

== History ==
Gurucharan Sharma Roy was the first editor of Rangapur Bartabaha. Nilambar Mukhopadhyaya bought the rights to the paper when he died in the fourth year of its publication (3rd Bhadra, 1258 BS).

This weekly newspaper was printed from the first printing press in Bangladesh called Bartabaha Jantralay.

On 13 June 1857, the then Governor Lord Canning issued Act No. 15. The Rangpur Bartabah was abolished in 1859 by this act which was detrimental to the freedom of the printing press as reported.
