= Harish Bhadani =

Rajasthani poet

- Born: 11 June 1933; Bikaner, Bikaner State, British India
- Died: 2 October 2009 (aged 76); Bikaner, Rajasthan, India
- Occupation: Poet

Harish Bhadani (11 June 1933 – 2 October 2009) was a Rajasthani poet. He was vice-president of Janvadi Lekhak Sangh. He was editor of Vatayan from 1960 to 1974.
