= Harish Kumar =

Harish Kumar may refer to:

- Harish Kumar (actor) (born 1975), Indian film actor
- Harish Kumar (cricketer), Indian cricketer
- Harish Kumar Gangawar (born 1930), Indian Member of Parliament
- Harish Kumar (sepak takraw), Indian athlete
- Queen Harish (1979–2019), Indian folk dancer
