= Harish Mehta =

Harish Mehta may refer to:

- Harish C. Mehta, Indian historian
- Harish S. Mehta, Indian businessman
