= Harish Khanna =

Harish Khanna may refer to:

- Harish Khanna (politician), Indian 21st century politician
- Harish Khanna (actor) (fl. 1995–present), Indian actor
