= Haris, Mazandaran =

Haris حريث
- Village
- Location within Iran
- Coordinates: 36°26′53″N 51°14′24″E
- Country: Iran
- Province: Mazandaran
- County: Chalus
- Bakhsh: Marzanabad
- Rural District: Birun Bashm

Population (2016)
  - Total: 96
- Time zone: UTC+3:30 (IRST)

Haris (Persian: حريث, also Romanized as Ḩarīs̄ and Ḩarīş) is a village in Birun Bashm Rural District, Marzanabad District, Chalus County, Mazandaran Province, Iran.

At the time of the 2006 National Census, the village's population was 121 in 43 households, when it was in Kelardasht District. The following census in 2011 counted 92 people in 34 households, by which time the rural district had been separated from the district in the formation of Marzanabad District. The 2016 census measured the population of the village as 96 people in 40 households.
