= Harish Chandra Burnwal =

Indian writer and journalist

Dr. Harish Chandra Burnwal
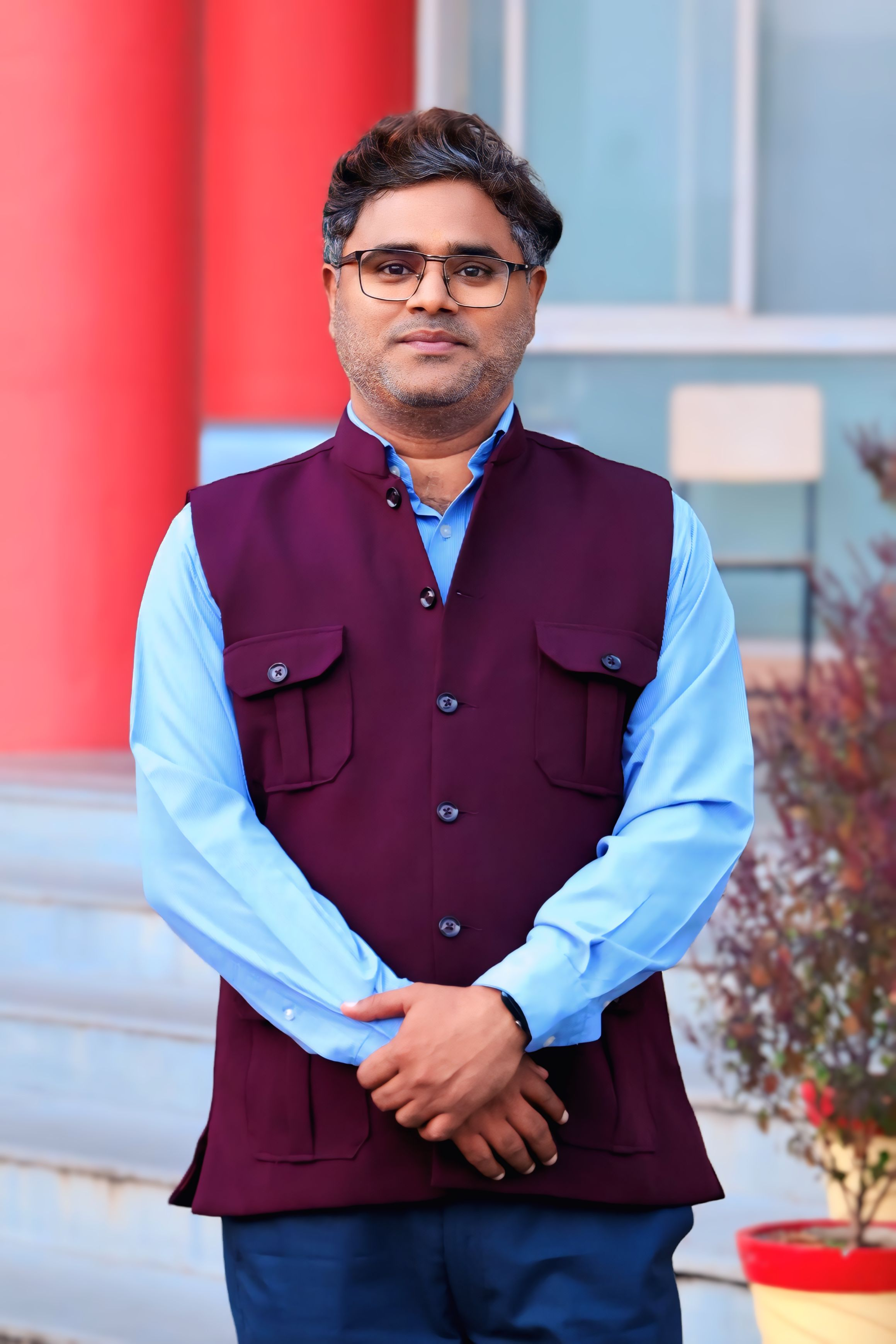
- Born: Neamatpur, Asansol, West Bengal
- Education: Ph.D., Masters in Television Journalism, Bachelor of Political Science: University of Delhi; Jamia Millia Islamia; Manav Rachna International Institute of Research and Studies
- Occupations: Writer, Journalist
- Writing career
- Language: Hindi, English
- Notable awards: Bharatendu Harishchandra Awards
- Website: harishburnwal.com

Dr. Harish Chandra Burnwal or Dr. Harish Chandra Barnwal is an Indian writer, journalist, lyricist and Bhajan singer. He received a Bharatendu Harishchandra Award for his work Television ki Bhasha in 2011. Burnwal authored the vBook Lord of Records, which was launched by the Indira Gandhi National Centre for the Arts (IGNCA), an autonomous institution under the Ministry of Culture, Government of India. The vBook was released by Bharatiya Janata Party president J. P. Nadda on 17 September 2020. He is the author of eight books covering media, literature and public affairs. In 2026, he received a Ph.D. for research on Prime Minister Narendra Modi's Mann Ki Baat programme.

== Personal life ==
Burnwal was born in Neamatpur near Asansol in West Bengal. He has a Bachelor of Political Science from Delhi University(Topper) and a Masters in Television Journalism from Jamia Millia Islamia. He has a Master of Journalism degree in Journalism from Guru Jamveshwar University and PG Diploma in Human Rights.

== Academic Research ==
In 2026, Burnwal was awarded a Ph.D. by Manav Rachna International Institute of Research and Studies for research on Prime Minister Narendra Modi's radio programme Mann Ki Baat and its relationship with Sustainable Development Goals (SDGs).

== Published works ==
Burnwal has published many books, but Television ki Bhasha is his most famous book.

=== Books Collection ===
- Sangh Ki Ansuni Kahaniyan (2025) – Google Books • Prabhat Prakashan
- Lord of Records (2019)
- Television ki Bhasha
- Sach kahata hun
- Modi Mantra
- Modi Sutra
- Modi Neeti
- Operation Sindoor: 100 Sarvashreshtha Kavitayen (2026)

=== Poetry Collection ===
- Laharon ki Goonj

=== vBook ===
- Lord Of Records - World's first vBook

== Music ==
Burnwal has written and produced devotional and contemporary songs that are available on major music streaming platforms, including Spotify, Apple Music, Amazon Music and JioSaavn.

=== Bhajan ===
- To Kya Mera Koi Kanhaiya Nahi - Krishna Bhajan

== Awards ==
Burnwal archive many awards from his own hard work.

- Bharatendu Harishchandra Awards
- Lord Baden Powell National Award
- Akhil Bharatiya Amritlal Nagar Award
- Kadambini Award
- Kathadesh Award
- Narad Award
