= Kaushik Patel =

Indian politician

Kaushik Jamnadas Patel is an Indian politician from Gujarat. A former revenue minister, Patel was a member of the Gujarat Legislative Assembly from Dariapur (Ahmedabad) in 1995, 1998 and 2002. He is a trusted associate of party chief Amit Shah, having contested from Naranpur constituency which was vacated by Amit Shah.

== See also ==
- Nimaben Acharya
- Hemaben Acharya
- Suryakant Acharya
