= The Bengal Times =

- Owner: Habibul Ahnaf Khan
- Publisher: Linkon Talukder
- Editor-in-chief: Alfazur Rahman
- Founded: 1871
- Language: Bangla, English
- Headquarters: Dhaka
- Country: Bangladesh
- Website: bengaltimes.co

The Bengal Times a newspaper published from Dhaka. It was the second newspaper of its kind published in 1871. E. C. Kemp was the editor. The Bengal Times was a very influential newspaper in East Bengal. An 1875 review of the region by Scottish historian William Wilson Hunter stated: "The principal English journal is the Bengal Times, lately called the Dacca News, a weekly periodical with an estimated circulation of about 250. It represents the interests of the great landholders and indigo and tea planters".

The paper was modern in format, type and in presenting news. The magazine, which was published every Wednesday and Saturday, used to be printed in four columns. It used to contain extracts from different magazines, letters from London and Paris, some articles, brief news from Dhaka and other areas. Occasionally, poems were also published
