= Harish Chandra Patel =

Indian politician

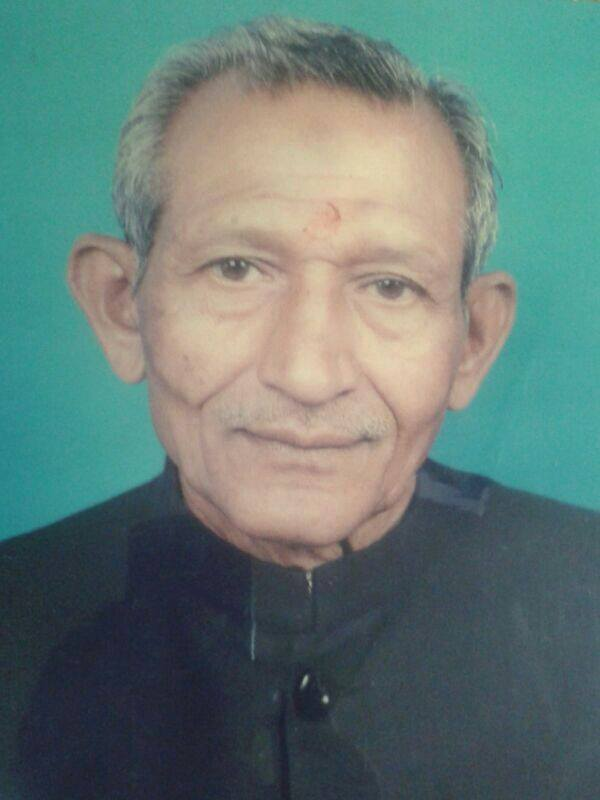
Harishchandra Patel (HL Patel)

Harishchandra L Patel (1928–1996) was a leader of Bharatiya Janata party from Gujarat, India. He served as the Speaker of the Gujarat Legislative Assembly from 1995 until his death in 1996. Patel was elected to the assembly from Sarkhej.

Born on 4 February 1928 at Dholka, District Ahmedabad. His father was Lavjibhai Narandas Patel, a freedom fighter and The President of Congress Party in the year 1930; his mother was Benkorben. He married Ushaben of Godhra, District Panchmahals.

He took part in "Quit India" movement in 1942 at the age of 14 years. and was jailed for 15 days. He was rusticated from Government School of Dhilka. He took admission with Sheth CN Vidyalaya Ahmedabad to pursue his studies and then with MP Pandya High School, Jetalpur, Dist. Ahmedabad. He graduated with Sanskrit from Gujarat College Ahmedabad. He joined RSS in 1943. He was detained along with 60,000 members of Rashtriya Swayamsevak Sangh after assassination of Mahatma Gandhi. He served as a teacher of Sanskrit language at Bharuch, Ahmedabad.

He started legal practice in 1954 at Ahmedabad. He started his practice as a lawyer at Gujarat High Court from the day its inception, i.e. 1 May 1960 and he was elected as President of Gujarat High Court Advocates' Association several times. He was detained under MISA in the year 1976 during Emergency period. He was also arrested in Anti price hike agitation in the year 1980.

He was elected twice as MLA from Sarkhej assembly constituency. He died of cancer on 16 September 1996. One party plot is named after him by Ahmedabad Municipal Corporation.

His son Vijay Patel defeated Rajesh Khanna in a by-election for Gandhinagar Loksabha in 1996. He also became MLA from Daskroi assembly constituency.
