= Arish, Iran =

Arish اريش
- Village
- Location within Iran
- Coordinates: 32°50′02″N 58°46′17″E
- Country: Iran
- Province: South Khorasan
- County: Khusf
- Bakhsh: Central District
- Rural District: Khusf

Population (2006)
  - Total: 12
- Time zone: UTC+3:30 (IRST)
  - Summer (DST): UTC+4:30 (IRDT)

Arish (Persian: اريش, also Romanized as Ārīsh; also known as Ārishk, Harīsh, and Horīsh) is a village in Khusf Rural District, Central District, Khusf County, South Khorasan Province, Iran. At the 2006 census, its population was 12, in 5 families.
