= Harish Chandra Mitra =

Bengali writer (1837-1872)

- Born: 1837; Dhaka
- Died: 1872 (aged 34–35)
- Occupations: Journalist, Teacher
- Relatives: Abhay Charan Mitra (Father)
- Writing career
- Language: Bengali

Harish Chandra Mitra (1837–1872) was a Bengali playwright, poet, essayist, journalist. His father, Abhay Charan Mitra was a resident of Howrah, West Bengal. He spent his childhood in dire poverty. In his teen-hood, he joined a press as a compositor. Later he became a teacher at a junior school in Dhaka. At the age of 21, his first poem was published in 1858 in the Sambad Probhakar. He was an orthodox Hindu and opposed Brahmoism and obscenity in literature.

In the last phase of his life, Mitra was mainly a journalist, editor and publisher. He published the first newspaper from Dhaka: monthly Kavita Kushumabali(1860). Mitra edited many newspapers; among them are monthly Abakashranjika(1862), weekly Dhaka Darpan(1863), Kabya Prokash (1864), Hindu Hitoishi (1865), and Hindu Ranjika (1868). Weekly Dhaka Darpan(1863) was the first weekly published from Dhaka. Monthly Mitra Prokash (1870), which is said to be one of the best periodicals published from Dhaka in the 19th century was published and edited by Harish Chandra Mitra.

== Publications ==
=== Plays ===
- Shuvashya Shigrang
- Myao Dharbe Ke(1862)
- Ghar Thakte Babui Bheje(1863),
- Janaki Natak(1863)
- Joydhuth Badh Brittanta(1864)
- Prahlad Natak(1872)
- Onuda Jubati(1872)
- Hatabhagya Shikshak(1872)

==== Verse plays ====
- Agamoni (1870)
- Natoon Jamai
- Hathat Babu
- Sal Nai Kukurer Bagha Nam

=== Poetry ===
- Hashyarash Tarangini (1862),
- Bidhoba Bangalalona (1863),
- Beer Bakyabali (1864),
- Kichak Badh Kabya (1866),
- Bangabala (1868),
- Ramayana (1869),
- Kavi Rahashya (1870),
- Kavi Kautuk (1870),
- Nirbashita Sita (1871),
- Durbhagini Shyama (1872),
- Kavitabali (1872),
- Charu Kavita (3 vol, 1872)

=== Prose ===
- Kautuk Shatak (1863),
- Kirtibasher Parichay (1870),
- Kavikalap (1866)

Harish Chandra Mitra also wrote a number of school-text books including Saralpath (1863), Kavita Kaumoodi (3 vol), Chhatra Sakha, Kushumlata, and Chasitabalir Artha.
